= List of teams and cyclists in the 2018 Giro d'Italia =

List of cyclists

The following is a list of teams and cyclists that took part in the 2018 Giro d'Italia.

== Teams ==
All 18 UCI WorldTeams were automatically invited and were obliged to attend the race. Four wildcard UCI Professional Continental teams were also selected. Each team is expected to start with eight riders (one less than in the previous year). The teams entering the race are:

UCI WorldTeams

- AG2R La Mondiale
- Astana
- Bahrain–Merida
- BMC Racing Team
- Bora–Hansgrohe
- EF Education First–Drapac p/b Cannondale
- Team Dimension Data
- Team Katusha–Alpecin
- LottoNL–Jumbo
- Lotto–Soudal
- Movistar Team
- Mitchelton–Scott
- Quick-Step Floors
- Team Sky
- Team Sunweb
- Trek–Segafredo
- UAE Team Emirates
- Groupama–FDJ

UCI Professional Continental teams

- Bardiani–CSF
- Androni Giocattoli–Sidermec
- Israel Cycling Academy
- Wilier Triestina–Selle Italia

== Cyclists ==
Legend
No.	Starting number worn by the rider during the Giro
Pos.	Position in the general classification
Time	Deficit to the winner of the general classification
†	Denotes riders born on or after 1 January 1993 eligible for the young rider classification
General classification	Denotes the winner of the general classification
Points classification	Denotes the winner of the points classification
Mountains classification	Denotes the winner of the mountains classification
Young rider classification	Denotes the winner of the young rider classification (eligibility indicated by †)
HD	Denotes a rider who failed to finish within the time limit, followed by the stage in which this occurred
DNS	Denotes a rider who did not start, followed by the stage before which he withdrew
DNF	Denotes a rider who did not finish, followed by the stage in which he withdrew
DSQ	Denotes a rider who did was disqualified, followed by the stage in which this occurred
Ages correct as of 4 May 2018, the date on which the Giro began

=== By starting number ===
No.	Name	Nationality	Team	Age	Pos.	Time	Ref.
1	Tom Dumoulin	Netherlands	Team Sunweb	27	2	+ 46"	
2	Roy Curvers	Netherlands	Team Sunweb	38	128	+ 4h 55' 00"	
3	Chad Haga	United States	Team Sunweb	29	71	+ 3h 20' 46"	
4	Chris Hamilton †	Australia	Team Sunweb	22	103	+ 4h 19' 34"	
5	Lennard Hofstede †	Netherlands	Team Sunweb	23	144	+ 5h 18' 53"	
6	Sam Oomen †	Netherlands	Team Sunweb	22	9	+ 14' 18"	
7	Laurens Ten Dam	Netherlands	Team Sunweb	37	35	+ 2h 02' 53"	
8	Louis Vervaeke †	Belgium	Team Sunweb	24	DNF-19	-	
11	Alexandre Geniez	France	AG2R La Mondiale	30	11	+ 17' 30"	
12	François Bidard	France	AG2R La Mondiale	26	37	+ 2h 06' 25"	
13	Mickaël Chérel	France	AG2R La Mondiale	32	DNF-19	-	
14	Nico Denz †	Germany	AG2R La Mondiale	24	62	+ 3h 06' 03"	
15	Hubert Dupont	France	AG2R La Mondiale	37	20	+ 1h 03' 54"	
16	Quentin Jaurégui †	France	AG2R La Mondiale	24	48	+ 2h 29' 16"	
17	Matteo Montaguti	Italy	AG2R La Mondiale	34	42	+ 2h 17' 10"	
18	Clément Venturini †	France	AG2R La Mondiale	24	104	+ 4h 20' 56"	
21	Francesco Gavazzi	Italy	Androni Giocattoli–Sidermec	33	53	+ 2h 45' 41"	
22	Davide Ballerini †	Italy	Androni Giocattoli–Sidermec	23	68	+ 3h 14' 02"	
23	Manuel Belletti	Italy	Androni Giocattoli–Sidermec	32	123	+ 4h 45' 51"	
24	Mattia Cattaneo	Italy	Androni Giocattoli–Sidermec	27	33	+ 2h 00' 17"	
25	Marco Frapporti	Italy	Androni Giocattoli–Sidermec	33	119	+ 4h 41' 35"	
26	Fausto Masnada †	Italy	Androni Giocattoli–Sidermec	24	26	+ 1h 26' 13"	
27	Rodolfo Torres	Colombia	Androni Giocattoli–Sidermec	31	59	+ 2h 58' 56"	
28	Andrea Vendrame †	Italy	Androni Giocattoli–Sidermec	23	90	+ 4h 06' 38"	
31	Miguel Ángel López †	Colombia	Astana	24	3	+ 4' 57"	
32	Pello Bilbao	Spain	Astana	28	6	+ 11' 50"	
33	Jan Hirt	Czechia	Astana	27	46	+ 2h 26' 47"	
34	Tanel Kangert	Estonia	Astana	31	DNS-13	-	
35	Alexey Lutsenko	Kazakhstan	Astana	25	87	+ 4h 04' 11"	
36	Luis León Sánchez	Spain	Astana	34	25	+ 1h 23' 11"	
37	Davide Villella	Italy	Astana	26	70	+ 3h 19' 53"	
38	Andrey Zeits	Kazakhstan	Astana	31	67	+ 3h 13' 51"	
41	Domenico Pozzovivo	Italy	Bahrain–Merida	35	5	+ 8' 03"	
42	Manuele Boaro	Italy	Bahrain–Merida	31	75	+ 3h 30' 05"	
43	Niccolo Bonifazio †	Italy	Bahrain–Merida	24	113	+ 4h 34' 24"	
44	Matej Mohorič	Slovenia	Bahrain–Merida	23	30	+ 1h 40' 18"	
45	Antonio Nibali	Italy	Bahrain–Merida	25	100	+ 4h 14' 30"	
46	Domen Novak †	Slovenia	Bahrain–Merida	22	101	+ 4h 15' 24"	
47	Kanstantsin Siutsou	Belarus	Bahrain–Merida	35	DNS-1	-	
48	Giovanni Visconti †	Italy	Bahrain–Merida	35	38	+ 2h 07' 32"	
51	Giulio Ciccone †	Italy	Bardiani–CSF	23	40	+ 2h 08' 55"	
52	Simone Andreetta †	Italy	Bardiani–CSF	24	125	+ 4h 46' 51"	
53	Enrico Barbin	Italy	Bardiani–CSF	28	94	+ 4h 08' 34"	
54	Andrea Guardini	Italy	Bardiani–CSF	28	DNF-4	-	
55	Mirco Maestri	Italy	Bardiani–CSF	26	DNF-19	-	
56	Manuel Senni	Italy	Bardiani–CSF	26	DNF-15	-	
57	Paolo Simion	Italy	Bardiani–CSF	25	145	+ 5h 25' 31"	
58	Alessandro Tonelli	Italy	Bardiani–CSF	25	DNS-15	-	
61	Rohan Dennis	Australia	BMC Racing Team	27	16	+ 56' 07"	
62	Alessandro de Marchi	Italy	BMC Racing Team	31	65	+ 3h 11' 06"	
63	Jean-Pierre Drucker	Luxembourg	BMC Racing Team	31	118	+ 4h 40' 19"	
64	Kilian Frankiny †	Switzerland	BMC Racing Team	24	43	+ 2h 20' 10"	
65	Nicolas Roche	Ireland	BMC Racing Team	33	DNF-15	-	
66	Jürgen Roelandts	Belgium	BMC Racing Team	32	124	+ 4h 45' 53"	
67	Francisco Ventoso	Spain	BMC Racing Team	34	89	+ 4h 06' 01"	
68	Loïc Vliegen †	Belgium	BMC Racing Team	24	DNF-15	-	
71	Davide Formolo	Italy	Bora–Hansgrohe	25	10	+ 15' 16"	
72	Cesare Benedetti	Italy	Bora–Hansgrohe	30	108	+ 4h 23' 41"	
73	Sam Bennett	Ireland	Bora–Hansgrohe	27	112	+ 4h 32' 23"	
74	Felix Großschartner †	Austria	Bora–Hansgrohe	24	27	+ 1h 28' 47"	
75	Patrick Konrad	Austria	Bora–Hansgrohe	26	7	+ 13' 01"	
76	Christoph Pfingsten	Germany	Bora–Hansgrohe	30	58	+ 2h 56' 01"	
77	Andreas Schillinger	Germany	Bora–Hansgrohe	34	139	+ 5h 08' 33"	
78	Rüdiger Selig	Germany	Bora–Hansgrohe	29	DNS-6	-	
81	Thibaut Pinot	France	Groupama–FDJ	27	DNS-21	-	
82	William Bonnet	France	Groupama–FDJ	35	DNF-19	-	
83	Mathieu Ladagnous	France	Groupama–FDJ	33	DNF-21	-	
84	Steve Morabito	Switzerland	Groupama–FDJ	35	79	+ 3h 45' 10"	
85	Georg Preidler	Austria	Groupama–FDJ	27	29	+ 1h 31' 28"	
86	Sébastien Reichenbach	Switzerland	Groupama–FDJ	28	22	+ 1h 15' 18"	
87	Anthony Roux	France	Groupama–FDJ	31	76	+ 3h 39' 48"	
88	Jérémy Roy	France	Groupama–FDJ	34	109	+ 4h 24' 39"	
91	Ben Hermans	Belgium	Israel Cycling Academy	31	45	+ 2h 25' 01"	
92	Guillaume Boivin	Canada	Israel Cycling Academy	28	117	+ 4h 40' 13"	
93	Zakkari Dempster	Australia	Israel Cycling Academy	30	126	+ 4h 49' 40"	
94	Krists Neilands †	Latvia	Israel Cycling Academy	23	73	+ 3h 28' 13"	
95	Guy Niv †	Israel	Israel Cycling Academy	24	DNF-5	-	
96	Rubén Plaza	Spain	Israel Cycling Academy	38	47	+ 2h 27' 57"	
97	Kristian Sbaragli	Italy	Israel Cycling Academy	27	111	+ 4h 28' 29"	
98	Guy Sagiv †	Israel	Israel Cycling Academy	23	141	+ 5h 15' 42"	
101	Tim Wellens	Belgium	Lotto–Soudal	26	DNS-14	-	
102	Sander Armée	Belgium	Lotto–Soudal	32	57	+ 2h 53' 44"	
103	Lars Bak	Denmark	Lotto–Soudal	38	106	+ 4h 22' 00"	
104	Victor Campenaerts	Belgium	Lotto–Soudal	26	DNS-17	-	
105	Jens Debusschere	Belgium	Lotto–Soudal	28	136	+ 5h 03' 59"	
106	Adam Hansen	Australia	Lotto–Soudal	36	60	+ 3h 00' 57"	
107	Tosh Van der Sande	Belgium	Lotto–Soudal	27	DNF-17	-	
109	Frederik Frison	Belgium	Lotto–Soudal	25	142	+ 5h 15' 59"	
111	Esteban Chaves	Colombia	Mitchelton–Scott	28	72	+ 3h 21' 31"	
112	Sam Bewley	New Zealand	Mitchelton–Scott	30	130	+ 4h 55' 48"	
113	Jack Haig †	Australia	Mitchelton–Scott	24	36	+ 2h 03' 06"	
114	Christopher Juul-Jensen	Denmark	Mitchelton–Scott	28	74	+ 3h 28' 31"	
115	Roman Kreuziger	Czechia	Mitchelton–Scott	31	55	+ 2h 51' 50"	
116	Mikel Nieve	Spain	Mitchelton–Scott	33	17	+ 58' 16"	
117	Svein Tuft	Canada	Mitchelton–Scott	40	147	+ 5h 32' 52"	
118	Simon Yates	Great Britain	Mitchelton–Scott	25	21	+ 1h 15' 11"	
121	Carlos Betancur	Colombia	Movistar Team	28	15	+ 41' 48"	
122	Richard Carapaz †	Ecuador	Movistar Team	24	4	+ 5' 44"	
123	Víctor de la Parte	Spain	Movistar Team	31	39	+ 2h 08' 19"	
124	Rubén Fernández	Spain	Movistar Team	27	85	+ 3h 59' 36"	
125	Antonio Pedrero	Spain	Movistar Team	26	92	+ 4h 07' 15"	
126	Dayer Quintana	Colombia	Movistar Team	25	82	+ 3h 54' 32"	
127	Eduardo Sepúlveda	Argentina	Movistar Team	26	96	+ 4h 10' 17"	
128	Rafael Valls	Spain	Movistar Team	30	DNF-10	-	
131	Elia Viviani	Italy	Quick-Step Floors	29	132	+ 4h 57' 04"	
132	Eros Capecchi	Italy	Quick-Step Floors	31	49	+ 2h 42' 24"	
133	Rémi Cavagna †	France	Quick-Step Floors	22	115	+ 4h 36' 25"	
134	Michael Mørkøv	Denmark	Quick-Step Floors	33	107	+ 4h 22' 56"	
135	Fabio Sabatini	Italy	Quick-Step Floors	33	129	+ 4h 55' 09"	
136	Maximilian Schachmann †	Germany	Quick-Step Floors	24	31	+ 1h 41' 36"	
137	Florian Sénéchal †	France	Quick-Step Floors	24	135	+ 4h 59' 31"	
138	Zdeněk Štybar	Czechia	Quick-Step Floors	32	80	+ 3h 50' 40"	
141	Louis Meintjes	South Africa	Team Dimension Data	26	DNS-17	-	
142	Igor Antón	Spain	Team Dimension Data	35	DNF-15	-	
143	Natnael Berhane	Eritrea	Team Dimension Data	27	83	+ 3h 54' 37"	
144	Ryan Gibbons †	South Africa	Team Dimension Data	23	84	+ 3h 58' 31"	
145	Ben King	United States	Team Dimension Data	29	44	+ 2h 24' 26"	
146	Ben O'Connor †	Australia	Team Dimension Data	22	DNF-19	-	
147	Jacques Janse Van Rensburg	South Africa	Team Dimension Data	30	78	+ 3h 43' 35"	
148	Jaco Venter	South Africa	Team Dimension Data	31	95	+ 4h 10' 02"	
151	Michael Woods	Canada	EF Education First–Drapac p/b Cannondale	31	19	+ 1h 01' 24"	
152	Thomas Scully	New Zealand	EF Education First–Drapac p/b Cannondale	28	DNS-14	-	
153	Hugh Carthy †	Great Britain	EF Education First–Drapac p/b Cannondale	23	77	+ 3h 43' 25"	
154	Mitchell Docker	Australia	EF Education First–Drapac p/b Cannondale	31	131	+ 4h 56' 30"	
155	Joe Dombrowski	United States	EF Education First–Drapac p/b Cannondale	26	63	+ 3h 09' 17"	
156	Sacha Modolo	Italy	EF Education First–Drapac p/b Cannondale	30	88	+ 4h 05' 44"	
157	Tom Van Asbroeck	Belgium	EF Education First–Drapac p/b Cannondale	28	133	+ 4h 57' 56"	
158	Nathan Brown	United States	EF Education First–Drapac p/b Cannondale	26	52	+ 2h 42' 39"	
161	Maxim Belkov	Russia	Team Katusha–Alpecin	33	127	+ 4h 51' 09"	
162	Alex Dowsett	Great Britain	Team Katusha–Alpecin	29	120	+ 4h 41' 53"	
163	José Gonçalves	Portugal	Team Katusha–Alpecin	29	14	+ 34' 29"	
164	Vyacheslav Kuznetsov	Russia	Team Katusha–Alpecin	28	105	+ 4h 21' 56"	
165	Maurits Lammertink	Netherlands	Team Katusha–Alpecin	27	41	+ 2h 10' 27"	
166	Tony Martin	Germany	Team Katusha–Alpecin	33	110	+ 4h 27' 59"	
167	Baptiste Planckaert	Belgium	Team Katusha–Alpecin	29	116	+ 4h 39' 44"	
168	Mads Würtz Schmidt †	Denmark	Team Katusha–Alpecin	24	81	+ 3h 53' 07"	
171	Enrico Battaglin	Italy	LottoNL–Jumbo	28	34	+ 2h 02' 15"	
172	George Bennett	New Zealand	LottoNL–Jumbo	28	8	+ 13' 17"	
173	Koen Bouwman †	Netherlands	LottoNL–Jumbo	24	50	+ 2h 42' 38"	
174	Jos van Emden	Netherlands	LottoNL–Jumbo	33	99	+ 4h 14' 22"	
175	Robert Gesink	Netherlands	LottoNL–Jumbo	31	23	+ 1h 19' 49"	
176	Gijs Van Hoecke	Belgium	LottoNL–Jumbo	26	122	+ 4h 44' 25"	
177	Bert-Jan Lindeman	Netherlands	LottoNL–Jumbo	28	114	+ 4h 36' 23"	
178	Danny van Poppel †	Netherlands	LottoNL–Jumbo	24	121	+ 4h 43' 41"	
181	Chris Froome	Great Britain	Team Sky	32	1	89h 02' 39"	
182	David de la Cruz	Spain	Team Sky	28	56	+ 2h 52' 42"	
183	Kenny Elissonde	France	Team Sky	26	51	+ 2h 42' 39"	
184	Sergio Henao	Colombia	Team Sky	30	13	+ 29' 41"	
185	Vasil Kiryienka	Belarus	Team Sky	36	DNF-19	-	
186	Christian Knees	Germany	Team Sky	37	91	+ 4h 07' 02"	
187	Wout Poels	Netherlands	Team Sky	30	12	+ 17' 40"	
188	Salvatore Puccio	Italy	Team Sky	28	64	+ 3h 10' 40"	
191	Gianluca Brambilla	Italy	Trek–Segafredo	30	18	+ 1h 00' 30"	
192	Laurent Didier	Luxembourg	Trek–Segafredo	33	97	+ 4h 11' 05"	
193	Niklas Eg †	Denmark	Trek–Segafredo	23	93	+ 4h 08' 20"	
194	Markel Irizar	Spain	Trek–Segafredo	38	134	+ 4h 59' 12"	
195	Ryan Mullen †	Ireland	Trek–Segafredo	23	138	+ 5h 08' 12"	
196	Jarlinson Pantano	Colombia	Trek–Segafredo	29	54	+ 2h 48' 11"	
197	Boy Van Poppel	Netherlands	Trek–Segafredo	30	137	+ 5h 05' 39"	
198	Mads Pedersen †	Denmark	Trek–Segafredo	22	140	+ 5h 09' 34"	
201	Fabio Aru	Italy	UAE Team Emirates	27	DNF-19	-	
202	Darwin Atapuma	Colombia	UAE Team Emirates	30	61	+ 3h 04' 46"	
203	Valerio Conti †	Italy	UAE Team Emirates	25	24	+ 1h 23' 04"	
204	Vegard Stake Laengen	Norway	UAE Team Emirates	29	102	+ 4h 17' 23"	
205	Marco Marcato	Italy	UAE Team Emirates	34	69	+ 3h 19' 46"	
206	Manuele Mori	Italy	UAE Team Emirates	37	66	+ 3h 12' 32"	
207	Jan Polanc	Slovenia	UAE Team Emirates	25	32	+ 1h 58' 09"	
208	Diego Ulissi	Italy	UAE Team Emirates	28	28	+ 1h 31' 28"	
211	Jakub Mareczko †	Italy	Wilier Triestina–Selle Italia	24	DNF-9	-	
212	Liam Bertazzo	Italy	Wilier Triestina–Selle Italia	26	143	+ 5h 18' 15"	
213	Marco Coledan	Italy	Wilier Triestina–Selle Italia	29	146	+ 5h 32' 07"	
214	Giuseppe Fonzi	Italy	Wilier Triestina–Selle Italia	26	149	+ 5h 48' 37"	
215	Jacopo Mosca †	Italy	Wilier Triestina–Selle Italia	24	98	+ 4h 11' 21"	
216	Alex Turrin	Italy	Wilier Triestina–Selle Italia	25	86	+ 4h 02' 56"	
217	Edoardo Zardini	Italy	Wilier Triestina–Selle Italia	28	DNS-7	-	
218	Eugert Zhupa	Albania	Wilier Triestina–Selle Italia	28	148	+ 5h 34' 14"	

=== By team ===
Team Sunweb (SUN)
No.	Rider	Pos.
1	Tom Dumoulin (NED)	2
2	Roy Curvers (NED)	124
3	Chad Haga (USA)	71
4	Chris Hamilton (AUS)	103
5	Lennard Hofstede (NED)	144
6	Sam Oomen (NED)	9
7	Laurens Ten Dam (NED)	35
8	Louis Vervaeke (BEL)	DNF-19

AG2R La Mondiale (ALM)
No.	Rider	Pos.
11	Alexandre Geniez (FRA)	11
12	François Bidard (FRA)	37
13	Mickaël Chérel (FRA)	DNF-19
14	Nico Denz (GER)	62
15	Hubert Dupont (FRA)	20
16	Quentin Jaurégui (FRA)	48
17	Matteo Montaguti (ITA)	42
18	Clément Venturini (FRA)	104

Androni Giocattoli–Sidermec (ANS)
No.	Rider	Pos.
21	Francesco Gavazzi (ITA)	53
22	Davide Ballerini (ITA)	68
23	Manuel Belletti (ITA)	123
24	Mattia Cattaneo (ITA)	33
25	Marco Frapporti (ITA)	119
26	Fausto Masnada (ITA)	26
27	Rodolfo Andrés Torres (COL)	59
28	Andrea Vendrame (ITA)	90

Astana (AST)
No.	Rider	Pos.
31	Miguel Ángel López (COL)	3
32	Pello Bilbao (ESP)	6
33	Jan Hirt (CZE)	46
34	Tanel Kangert (EST)	DNS-13
35	Alexey Lutsenko (KAZ)	87
36	Luis León Sánchez (ESP)	25
37	Davide Villella (ITA)	70
38	Andrey Zeits (KAZ)	67

Bahrain–Merida (TBM)
No.	Rider	Pos.
41	Domenico Pozzovivo (ITA)	5
42	Manuele Boaro (ITA)	75
43	Niccolo Bonifazio (ITA)	113
44	Matej Mohorič (SLO)	30
45	Antonio Nibali (ITA)	100
46	Domen Novak (SLO)	101
47	Kanstantsin Siutsou (BLR)	DNS-1
48	Giovanni Visconti (ITA)	38

Bardiani–CSF (BRD)
No.	Rider	Pos.
51	Giulio Ciccone (ITA)	40
52	Simone Andreetta (ITA)	125
53	Enrico Barbin (ITA)	94
54	Andrea Guardini (ITA)	DNF-4
55	Mirco Maestri (ITA)	DNF-19
56	Manuel Senni (ITA)	DNF-15
57	Paolo Simion (ITA)	145
58	Alessandro Tonelli (ITA)	DNS-15

BMC Racing Team (BMC)
No.	Rider	Pos.
61	Rohan Dennis (AUS)	16
62	Alessandro De Marchi (ITA)	65
63	Jean-Pierre Drucker (LUX)	118
64	Kilian Frankiny (SUI)	43
65	Nicolas Roche (IRL)	DNF-15
66	Jürgen Roelandts (BEL)	124
67	Francisco Ventoso (ESP)	89
68	Loïc Vliegen (BEL)	DNF-15

Bora–Hansgrohe (BOH)
No.	Rider	Pos.
71	Davide Formolo (ITA)	10
72	Cesare Benedetti (ITA)	108
73	Sam Bennett (IRL)	112
74	Felix Grossschartner (AUT)	27
75	Patrick Konrad (AUT)	7
76	Christoph Pfingsten (GER)	58
77	Rüdiger Selig (GER)	DNS-6
78	Andreas Schillinger (GER)	139

Groupama–FDJ (FDJ)
No.	Rider	Pos.
81	Thibaut Pinot (FRA)	DNS-21
82	William Bonnet (FRA)	DNF-19
83	Mathieu Ladagnous (FRA)	DNF-21
84	Steve Morabito (SUI)	79
85	Georg Preidler (AUT)	29
86	Sebastien Reichenbach (SUI)	22
87	Anthony Roux (FRA)	76
88	Jérémy Roy (FRA)	109

Israel Cycling Academy (ICA)
No.	Rider	Pos.
91	Ben Hermans (BEL)	45
92	Guillaume Boivin (CAN)	117
93	Zakkari Dempster (AUS)	126
94	Krists Neilands (LAT)	73
95	Guy Niv (ISR)	DNF-5
96	Rubén Plaza (ESP)	47
97	Kristian Sbaragli (ITA)	111
98	Guy Sagiv (ISR)	141

Lotto–Soudal (LTS)
No.	Rider	Pos.
101	Tim Wellens (BEL)	DNS-14
102	Sander Armée (BEL)	57
103	Lars Ytting Bak (DEN)	106
104	Victor Campenaerts (BEL)	DNS-17
105	Jens Debusschere (BEL)	136
106	Frederik Frison (BEL)	142
107	Adam Hansen (AUS)	60
109	Tosh Van der Sande (BEL)	DNF-17

Mitchelton–Scott (ORS)
No.	Rider	Pos.
111	Johan Esteban Chaves (COL)	72
112	Sam Bewley (NZL)	130
113	Jack Haig (AUS)	36
114	Christopher Juul-Jensen (DEN)	74
115	Roman Kreuziger (CZE)	55
116	Mikel Nieve (ESP)	17
117	Svein Tuft (CAN)	147
118	Simon Yates (GBR)	21

Movistar Team (MOV)
No.	Rider	Pos.
121	Carlos Betancur (COL)	15
122	Richard Carapaz (ECU)	4
123	Víctor de la Parte (ESP)	39
124	Rubén Fernández (ESP)	85
125	Antonio Pedrero (ESP)	92
126	Dayer Quintana (COL)	82
127	Eduardo Sepúlveda (ARG)	96
128	Rafael Valls (ESP)	DNF-10

Quick-Step Floors (QST)
No.	Rider	Pos.
131	Elia Viviani (ITA)	132
132	Eros Capecchi (ITA)	49
133	Rémi Cavagna (FRA)	115
134	Michael Mørkøv (DEN)	107
135	Fabio Sabatini (ITA)	129
136	Maximilian Schachmann (GER)	31
137	Florian Sénéchal (FRA)	135
138	Zdeněk Štybar (CZE)	80

Team Dimension Data (DDD)
No.	Rider	Pos.
141	Louis Meintjes (RSA)	DNS-17
142	Igor Anton (ESP)	DNF-15
143	Natnael Berhane (ERI)	83
144	Ryan Gibbons (RSA)	84
145	Benjamin King (USA)	44
146	Ben O'Connor (AUS)	DNF-19
147	Jacques Janse Van Rensburg (RSA)	78
148	Jaco Venter (RSA)	95

EF Education First–Drapac p/b Cannondale (CDT)
No.	Rider	Pos.
151	Nathan Brown (USA)	52
152	Hugh Carthy (GBR)	77
153	Mitchell Docker (AUS)	131
154	Joe Dombrowski (USA)	63
155	Sacha Modolo (ITA)	88
156	Thomas Scully (NZL)	DNS-14
157	Tom Van Asbroeck (BEL)	133
158	Michael Woods (CAN)	19

Team Katusha–Alpecin (KAT)
No.	Rider	Pos.
161	Maxim Belkov (RUS)	127
162	Alex Dowsett (GBR)	120
163	José Gonçalves (POR)	14
164	Viacheslav Kuznetsov (RUS)	105
165	Maurits Lammertink (NED)	41
166	Tony Martin (GER)	110
167	Baptiste Planckaert (BEL)	116
168	Mads Würtz Schmidt (DEN)	81

LottoNL–Jumbo (TLJ)
No.	Rider	Pos.
171	Enrico Battaglin (ITA)	34
172	George Bennett (NZL)	8
173	Koen Bouwman (NED)	50
174	Jos van Emden (NED)	99
175	Robert Gesink (NED)	23
176	Gijs Van Hoecke (BEL)	122
177	Bert-Jan Lindeman (NED)	114
178	Danny van Poppel (NED)	121

Team Sky (SKY)
No.	Rider	Pos.
181	Chris Froome (GBR)	1
182	David De La Cruz (ESP)	56
183	Kenny Elissonde (FRA)	51
184	Sergio Luis Henao (COL)	13
185	Vasil Kiryienka (BLR)	DNF-19
186	Christian Knees (GER)	91
187	Wout Poels (NED)	12
188	Salvatore Puccio (ITA)	64

Trek–Segafredo (TFS)
No.	Rider	Pos.
191	Gianluca Brambilla (ITA)	18
192	Laurent Didier (LUX)	97
193	Niklas Eg (DEN)	93
194	Markel Irizar (ESP)	134
195	Ryan Mullen (IRL)	138
196	Jarlinson Pantano (COL)	54
197	Boy van Poppel (NED)	137
198	Mads Pedersen (DEN)	140

UAE Team Emirates (UAD)
No.	Rider	Pos.
201	Fabio Aru (ITA)	DNF-19
202	John Darwin Atapuma (COL)	61
203	Valerio Conti (ITA)	24
204	Vegard Stake Laengen (NOR)	102
205	Marco Marcato (ITA)	69
206	Manuele Mori (ITA)	66
207	Jan Polanc (SLO)	32
208	Diego Ulissi (ITA)	28

Wilier Triestina–Selle Italia (WIL)
No.	Rider	Pos.
211	Jakub Mareczko (ITA)	DNF-9
212	Liam Bertazzo (ITA)	143
213	Marco Coledan (ITA)	146
214	Giuseppe Fonzi (ITA)	149
215	Jacopo Mosca (ITA)	98
216	Alex Turrin (ITA)	86
217	Edoardo Zardini (ITA)	DNS-7
218	Eugert Zhupa (ALB)	148

=== By nationality ===
The 176 riders that are competing in the 2018 Giro d'Italia originated from 32 different countries.

Country	No. of riders	Finishers	Stage wins
Albania	1	1	
Argentina	1	1	
Australia	7	6	1 (Rohan Dennis)
Austria	2	2	
Belarus	2	0	
Belgium	13	8	1 (Tim Wellens)
Canada	3	3	
Colombia	8	8	1 (Esteban Chaves)
Czechia	3	3	
Denmark	6	6	
Ecuador	1	1	1 (Richard Carapaz)
Eritrea	1	1	
Estonia	1	0	
France	15	11	
Germany	7	6	1 (Maximilian Schachmann)
Great Britain	4	4	5 (Simon Yates x3, Chris Froome x2)
Ireland	3	3	3 (Sam Bennett x3)
Israel	2	1	
Italy	46	39	5 (Elia Viviani x4, Enrico Battaglin)
Kazakhstan	2	2	
Latvia	1	1	
Luxembourg	2	2	
Netherlands	13	13	1 (Tom Dumoulin)
New Zealand	3	2	
Norway	1	1	
Portugal	1	1	
Russia	2	2	
Slovenia	3	3	1 (Matej Mohorič)
South Africa	4	3	
Spain	12	10	1 (Mikel Nieve)
Switzerland	3	3	
United States	4	4	
Total	176	149	21
