= 2018 Giro d'Italia, Stage 1 to Stage 11 =

Cycling race stages

The 2018 Giro d'Italia was the 101st edition of the Giro d'Italia, one of cycling's Grand Tours. The first half of the Giro began on 4 May in Jerusalem, Israel, with an individual time trial, and ended with Stage 11, a hilly stage to Osimo, occurring on 16 May; the second half of the tour started at Osimo on 17 May and finished in Rome on 27 May.

== Stage 1 ==
4 May 2018 – Jerusalem to Jerusalem, 9.7 km (6.0 mi) (ITT)

The first rider departed at 13:50 local time (UTC+03:00). The route started alongside the David Citadel Hotel, headed south and then west to the first timecheck, which was at the 5.1 km (3.2 mi) mark. The riders then turned back east and passed the Knesset. The route passed through a tunnel after 7.3 km (4.5 mi), and passed Mamilla Pool about 400 m (1,300 ft) from the finish line, with a short climb in the last few hundred metres before the finish.

Stage 1 result and general classification after stage 1

Rank	Rider	Team	Time
1	Tom Dumoulin (NED)	Team Sunweb	12' 02"
2	Rohan Dennis (AUS)	BMC Racing Team	+ 2"
3	Victor Campenaerts (BEL)	Lotto–FixAll	+ 2"
4	José Gonçalves (POR)	Team Katusha–Alpecin	+ 12"
5	Alex Dowsett (GBR)	Team Katusha–Alpecin	+ 16"
6	Pello Bilbao (ESP)	Astana	+ 18"
7	Simon Yates (GBR)	Mitchelton–Scott	+ 20"
8	Maximilian Schachmann (GER)	Quick-Step Floors	+ 21"
9	Tony Martin (GER)	Team Katusha–Alpecin	+ 27"
10	Domenico Pozzovivo (ITA)	Bahrain–Merida	+ 27"

== Stage 2 ==
5 May 2018 – Haifa to Tel Aviv, 167 km (104 mi)

Stage 2 result
Rank	Rider	Team	Time
1	Elia Viviani (ITA)	Quick-Step Floors	3h 51' 20"
2	Jakub Mareczko (ITA)	Wilier Triestina–Selle Italia	+ 0"
3	Sam Bennett (IRL)	Bora–Hansgrohe	+ 0"
4	Niccolo Bonifazio (ITA)	Bahrain–Merida	+ 0"
5	Sacha Modolo (ITA)	EF Education First–Drapac	+ 0"
6	Clément Venturini (FRA)	AG2R La Mondiale	+ 0"
7	Ryan Gibbons (RSA)	Team Dimension Data	+ 0"
8	Manuel Belletti (ITA)	Androni Giocattoli–Sidermec	+ 0"
9	Baptiste Planckaert (BEL)	Team Katusha–Alpecin	+ 0"
10	Jempy Drucker (LUX)	BMC Racing Team	+ 0"

General classification after Stage 2
Rank	Rider	Team	Time
1	Rohan Dennis (AUS)	BMC Racing Team	4h 03' 21"
2	Tom Dumoulin (NED)	Team Sunweb	+ 1"
3	Victor Campenaerts (BEL)	Lotto–Soudal	+ 3"
4	José Gonçalves (POR)	Team Katusha–Alpecin	+ 13"
5	Alex Dowsett (GBR)	Team Katusha–Alpecin	+ 17"
6	Pello Bilbao (ESP)	Astana	+ 19"
7	Simon Yates (GBR)	Mitchelton–Scott	+ 21"
8	Maximilian Schachmann (GER)	Quick-Step Floors	+ 22"
9	Tony Martin (GER)	Team Katusha–Alpecin	+ 28"
10	Domenico Pozzovivo (ITA)	Bahrain–Merida	+ 28"

== Stage 3 ==
6 May 2018 – Beersheba to Eilat, 229 km (142 mi)

Stage 3 result
Rank	Rider	Team	Time
1	Elia Viviani (ITA)	Quick-Step Floors	5h 02' 09"
2	Sacha Modolo (ITA)	EF Education First–Drapac	+ 0"
3	Sam Bennett (IRL)	Bora–Hansgrohe	+ 0"
4	Jakub Mareczko (ITA)	Wilier Triestina–Selle Italia	+ 0"
5	Danny van Poppel (NED)	LottoNL–Jumbo	+ 0"
6	Jens Debusschere (BEL)	Lotto–FixAll	+ 0"
7	Manuel Belletti (ITA)	Androni Giocattoli–Sidermec	+ 0"
8	Baptiste Planckaert (BEL)	Team Katusha–Alpecin	+ 0"
9	Mads Pedersen (DEN)	Trek–Segafredo	+ 0"
10	José Gonçalves (POR)	Team Katusha–Alpecin	+ 0"

General classification after Stage 3
Rank	Rider	Team	Time
1	Rohan Dennis (AUS)	BMC Racing Team	9h 05' 30"
2	Tom Dumoulin (NED)	Team Sunweb	+ 1"
3	José Gonçalves (POR)	Team Katusha–Alpecin	+ 13"
4	Alex Dowsett (GBR)	Team Katusha–Alpecin	+ 17"
5	Pello Bilbao (ESP)	Astana	+ 19"
6	Simon Yates (GBR)	Mitchelton–Scott	+ 21"
7	Maximilian Schachmann (GER)	Quick-Step Floors	+ 22"
8	Tony Martin (GER)	Team Katusha–Alpecin	+ 28"
9	Domenico Pozzovivo (ITA)	Bahrain–Merida	+ 28"
10	Carlos Betancur (COL)	Movistar Team	+ 29"

== Rest day 1 ==
7 May 2018 – Catania

During the morning, the riders and support staff transferred across the Mediterranean Sea, from Eilat in Israel to Catania in Sicily. This involved up to an hour of bus travel, and a further three hours by aircraft.

== Stage 4 ==
8 May 2018 – Catania to Caltagirone, 202 km (126 mi)

Stage 4 result
Rank	Rider	Team	Time
1	Tim Wellens (BEL)	Lotto–FixAll	5h 17' 34"
2	Michael Woods (CAN)	EF Education First–Drapac	+ 0"
3	Enrico Battaglin (ITA)	LottoNL–Jumbo	+ 0"
4	Simon Yates (GBR)	Mitchelton–Scott	+ 0"
5	Davide Formolo (ITA)	Bora–Hansgrohe	+ 0"
6	Roman Kreuziger (CZE)	Mitchelton–Scott	+ 4"
7	Patrick Konrad (AUT)	Bora–Hansgrohe	+ 4"
8	Luis León Sánchez (ESP)	Astana	+ 4"
9	Domenico Pozzovivo (ITA)	Bahrain–Merida	+ 4"
10	Esteban Chaves (COL)	Mitchelton–Scott	+ 4"

General classification after Stage 4
Rank	Rider	Team	Time
1	Rohan Dennis (AUS)	BMC Racing Team	14h 23' 08"
2	Tom Dumoulin (NED)	Team Sunweb	+ 1"
3	Simon Yates (GBR)	Mitchelton–Scott	+ 17"
4	Tim Wellens (BEL)	Lotto–FixAll	+ 19"
5	Pello Bilbao (ESP)	Astana	+ 25"
6	Maximilian Schachmann (GER)	Quick-Step Floors	+ 28"
7	Domenico Pozzovivo (ITA)	Bahrain–Merida	+ 28"
8	Thibaut Pinot (FRA)	Groupama–FDJ	+ 34"
9	Patrick Konrad (AUT)	Bora–Hansgrohe	+ 35"
10	Carlos Betancur (COL)	Movistar Team	+ 35"

== Stage 5 ==
9 May 2018 – Agrigento to Santa Ninfa, 153 km (95 mi)

Stage 5 result
Rank	Rider	Team	Time
1	Enrico Battaglin (ITA)	LottoNL–Jumbo	4h 06' 33"
2	Giovanni Visconti (ITA)	Bahrain–Merida	+ 0"
3	José Gonçalves (POR)	Team Katusha–Alpecin	+ 0"
4	Maximilian Schachmann (GER)	Quick-Step Floors	+ 0"
5	Simon Yates (GBR)	Mitchelton–Scott	+ 0"
6	Tim Wellens (BEL)	Lotto–FixAll	+ 0"
7	Francesco Gavazzi (ITA)	Androni Giocattoli–Sidermec	+ 0"
8	Maurits Lammertink (NED)	Team Katusha–Alpecin	+ 0"
9	Domenico Pozzovivo (ITA)	Bahrain–Merida	+ 0"
10	Patrick Konrad (AUT)	Bora–Hansgrohe	+ 0"

General classification after Stage 5
Rank	Rider	Team	Time
1	Rohan Dennis (AUS)	BMC Racing Team	18h 29' 41"
2	Tom Dumoulin (NED)	Team Sunweb	+ 1"
3	Simon Yates (GBR)	Mitchelton–Scott	+ 17"
4	Tim Wellens (BEL)	Lotto–FixAll	+ 19"
5	Pello Bilbao (ESP)	Astana	+ 25"
6	Maximilian Schachmann (GER)	Quick-Step Floors	+ 28"
7	Domenico Pozzovivo (ITA)	Bahrain–Merida	+ 28"
8	José Gonçalves (POR)	Team Katusha–Alpecin	+ 32"
9	Thibaut Pinot (FRA)	Groupama–FDJ	+ 34"
10	Patrick Konrad (AUT)	Bora–Hansgrohe	+ 35"

== Stage 6 ==
10 May 2018 – Caltanissetta to Mount Etna, 169 km (105 mi)

The riders departed from Caltanissetta, heading east to Enna and then turning south to Piazza Armerina. The race then continued east through Ramacca and Paternò. The route turned north through Belpasso and continued through Ragalna, where the 15 km (9.3 mi) Category 1 climb of Mount Etna began, to the astrophysical observatory at an altitude of 1,736 m (5,696 ft).

Stage 6 result
Rank	Rider	Team	Time
1	Esteban Chaves (COL)	Mitchelton–Scott	4h 16' 11"
2	Simon Yates (GBR)	Mitchelton–Scott	+ 0"
3	Thibaut Pinot (FRA)	Groupama–FDJ	+ 26"
4	George Bennett (NZL)	LottoNL–Jumbo	+ 26"
5	Domenico Pozzovivo (ITA)	Bahrain–Merida	+ 26"
6	Miguel Ángel López (COL)	Astana	+ 26"
7	Richard Carapaz (ECU)	Movistar Team	+ 26"
8	Tom Dumoulin (NED)	Team Sunweb	+ 26"
9	Fabio Aru (ITA)	UAE Team Emirates	+ 26"
10	Chris Froome (GBR)	Team Sky	+ 26"

General classification after Stage 6
Rank	Rider	Team	Time
1	Simon Yates (GBR)	Mitchelton–Scott	22h 46' 03"
2	Tom Dumoulin (NED)	Team Sunweb	+ 16"
3	Esteban Chaves (COL)	Mitchelton–Scott	+ 26"
4	Domenico Pozzovivo (ITA)	Bahrain–Merida	+ 43"
5	Thibaut Pinot (FRA)	Groupama–FDJ	+ 45"
6	Rohan Dennis (AUS)	BMC Racing Team	+ 53"
7	Pello Bilbao (ESP)	Astana	+ 1' 03"
8	Chris Froome (GBR)	Team Sky	+ 1' 10"
9	George Bennett (NZL)	LottoNL–Jumbo	+ 1' 11"
10	Fabio Aru (ITA)	UAE Team Emirates	+ 1' 12"

== Stage 7 ==
11 May 2018 – Pizzo to Praia a Mare, 159 km (99 mi)

Stage 7 result
Rank	Rider	Team	Time
1	Sam Bennett (IRL)	Bora–Hansgrohe	3h 45' 27"
2	Elia Viviani (ITA)	Quick-Step Floors	+ 0"
3	Niccolo Bonifazio (ITA)	Bahrain–Merida	+ 0"
4	Sacha Modolo (ITA)	EF Education First–Drapac	+ 0"
5	Danny van Poppel (NED)	LottoNL–Jumbo	+ 0"
6	Jakub Mareczko (ITA)	Wilier Triestina–Selle Italia	+ 0"
7	Clément Venturini (FRA)	AG2R La Mondiale	+ 0"
8	Mads Pedersen (DEN)	Trek–Segafredo	+ 0"
9	Jürgen Roelandts (BEL)	BMC Racing Team	+ 0"
10	Jens Debusschere (BEL)	Lotto–FixAll	+ 0"

General classification after Stage 7
Rank	Rider	Team	Time
1	Simon Yates (GBR)	Mitchelton–Scott	26h 31' 30"
2	Tom Dumoulin (NED)	Team Sunweb	+ 16"
3	Esteban Chaves (COL)	Mitchelton–Scott	+ 26"
4	Domenico Pozzovivo (ITA)	Bahrain–Merida	+ 43"
5	Thibaut Pinot (FRA)	Groupama–FDJ	+ 45"
6	Rohan Dennis (AUS)	BMC Racing Team	+ 53"
7	Pello Bilbao (ESP)	Astana	+ 1' 03"
8	Chris Froome (GBR)	Team Sky	+ 1' 10"
9	George Bennett (NZL)	LottoNL–Jumbo	+ 1' 11"
10	Fabio Aru (ITA)	UAE Team Emirates	+ 1' 12"

== Stage 8 ==
12 May 2018 – Praia a Mare to Montevergine, 209 km (130 mi)

The race departed northwest along the coast to Sapri, then heading inland and west to Licusati. The route again reached the coast after heading northwest to an intermediate sprint at Agropoli, and continued along the coast to another intermediate sprint at Salerno. From Salerno, the route began a gentle climb to Bellizzi Irpino. The race then continued onto the second category 17 km (11 mi) climb, through Mercogliano and Ospedaletto d'Alpinolo, to the finish at an altitude of 1,260 m (4,130 ft).

Stage 8 result
Rank	Rider	Team	Time
1	Richard Carapaz (ECU)	Movistar Team	5h 11' 35"
2	Davide Formolo (ITA)	Bora–Hansgrohe	+ 7"
3	Thibaut Pinot (FRA)	Groupama–FDJ	+ 7"
4	Enrico Battaglin (ITA)	LottoNL–Jumbo	+ 7"
5	Simon Yates (GBR)	Mitchelton–Scott	+ 7"
6	Domenico Pozzovivo (ITA)	Bahrain–Merida	+ 7"
7	Esteban Chaves (COL)	Mitchelton–Scott	+ 7"
8	Patrick Konrad (AUT)	Bora–Hansgrohe	+ 7"
9	Michael Woods (CAN)	EF Education First–Drapac	+ 7"
10	Pello Bilbao (ESP)	Astana	+ 7"

General classification after Stage 8
Rank	Rider	Team	Time
1	Simon Yates (GBR)	Mitchelton–Scott	31h 43' 12"
2	Tom Dumoulin (NED)	Team Sunweb	+ 16"
3	Esteban Chaves (COL)	Mitchelton–Scott	+ 26"
4	Thibaut Pinot (FRA)	Groupama–FDJ	+ 41"
5	Domenico Pozzovivo (ITA)	Bahrain–Merida	+ 43"
6	Rohan Dennis (AUS)	BMC Racing Team	+ 53"
7	Pello Bilbao (ESP)	Astana	+ 1' 03"
8	Richard Carapaz (ECU)	Movistar Team	+ 1' 06"
9	Chris Froome (GBR)	Team Sky	+ 1' 10"
10	George Bennett (NZL)	LottoNL–Jumbo	+ 1' 11"

== Stage 9 ==
13 May 2018 – Pesco Sannita to Gran Sasso, 225 km (140 mi)

The riders will depart heading west and then northwest to Isernia, and continue into a second category 9 km (5.6 mi) climb, to an altitude of 1,252 m (4,108 ft), at Roccaraso. After descending north, the race has intermediate sprints at Popoli and Bussi sul Tirino, before a 14 km (8.7 mi) second category climb to 1,190 m (3,900 ft) at Calascio. The race then continues climbing northwest into the first category 26 km (16 mi) climb, to the finish line at 2,135 m (7,005 ft), at Campo Imperatore.

Stage 9 result
Rank	Rider	Team	Time
1	Simon Yates (GBR)	Mitchelton–Scott	5h 54' 13"
2	Thibaut Pinot (FRA)	Groupama–FDJ	+ 0"
3	Esteban Chaves (COL)	Mitchelton–Scott	+ 0"
4	Domenico Pozzovivo (ITA)	Bahrain–Merida	+ 4"
5	Richard Carapaz (ECU)	Movistar Team	+ 4"
6	Davide Formolo (ITA)	Bora–Hansgrohe	+ 10"
7	George Bennett (NZL)	LottoNL–Jumbo	+ 12"
8	Tom Dumoulin (NED)	Team Sunweb	+ 12"
9	Miguel Ángel López (COL)	Astana	+ 12"
10	Giulio Ciccone (ITA)	Bardiani–CSF	+ 24"

General classification after Stage 9
Rank	Rider	Team	Time
1	Simon Yates (GBR)	Mitchelton–Scott	37h 37' 15"
2	Esteban Chaves (COL)	Mitchelton–Scott	+ 32"
3	Tom Dumoulin (NED)	Team Sunweb	+ 38"
4	Thibaut Pinot (FRA)	Groupama–FDJ	+ 45"
5	Domenico Pozzovivo (ITA)	Bahrain–Merida	+ 57"
6	Richard Carapaz (ECU)	Movistar Team	+ 1' 20"
7	George Bennett (NZL)	LottoNL–Jumbo	+ 1' 33"
8	Rohan Dennis (AUS)	BMC Racing Team	+ 2' 05"
9	Pello Bilbao (ESP)	Astana	+ 2' 05"
10	Michael Woods (CAN)	EF Education First–Drapac	+ 2' 25"

== Rest day 2 ==
14 May 2018 – Montesilvano

== Stage 10 ==
15 May 2018 – Penne to Gualdo Tadino, 244 km (152 mi)

Stage 10 result
Rank	Rider	Team	Time
1	Matej Mohorič (SLO)	Bahrain–Merida	6h 04' 52"
2	Nico Denz (GER)	AG2R La Mondiale	+ 0"
3	Sam Bennett (IRL)	Bora–Hansgrohe	+ 34"
4	Enrico Battaglin (ITA)	LottoNL–Jumbo	+ 34"
5	Davide Ballerini (ITA)	Androni Giocattoli–Sidermec	+ 34"
6	Mads Würtz Schmidt (DEN)	Team Katusha–Alpecin	+ 34"
7	Francesco Gavazzi (ITA)	Androni Giocattoli–Sidermec	+ 34"
8	Jarlinson Pantano (COL)	Trek–Segafredo	+ 34"
9	Gianluca Brambilla (ITA)	Trek–Segafredo	+ 34"
10	José Gonçalves (POR)	Team Katusha–Alpecin	+ 34"

General classification after Stage 10
Rank	Rider	Team	Time
1	Simon Yates (GBR)	Mitchelton–Scott	43h 42' 38"
2	Tom Dumoulin (NED)	Team Sunweb	+ 41"
3	Thibaut Pinot (FRA)	Groupama–FDJ	+ 46"
4	Domenico Pozzovivo (ITA)	Bahrain–Merida	+ 1' 00"
5	Richard Carapaz (ECU)	Movistar Team	+ 1' 23"
6	George Bennett (NZL)	LottoNL–Jumbo	+ 1' 36"
7	Rohan Dennis (AUS)	BMC Racing Team	+ 2' 08"
8	Pello Bilbao (ESP)	Astana	+ 2' 08"
9	Michael Woods (CAN)	EF Education First–Drapac	+ 2' 28"
10	Chris Froome (GBR)	Team Sky	+ 2' 30"

== Stage 11 ==
16 May 2018 – Assisi to Osimo, 156 km (97 mi)

Stage 11 result
Rank	Rider	Team	Time
1	Simon Yates (GBR)	Mitchelton–Scott	3h 25' 53"
2	Tom Dumoulin (NED)	Team Sunweb	+ 2"
3	Davide Formolo (ITA)	Bora–Hansgrohe	+ 5"
4	Alexandre Geniez (FRA)	AG2R La Mondiale	+ 8"
5	Domenico Pozzovivo (ITA)	Bahrain–Merida	+ 8"
6	Patrick Konrad (AUT)	Bora–Hansgrohe	+ 8"
7	Thibaut Pinot (FRA)	Groupama–FDJ	+ 8"
8	Maximilian Schachmann (GER)	Quick-Step Floors	+ 11"
9	Rohan Dennis (AUS)	BMC Racing Team	+ 18"
10	Fabio Aru (ITA)	UAE Team Emirates	+ 21"

General classification after Stage 11
Rank	Rider	Team	Time
1	Simon Yates (GBR)	Mitchelton–Scott	47h 08' 21"
2	Tom Dumoulin (NED)	Team Sunweb	+ 47"
3	Thibaut Pinot (FRA)	Groupama–FDJ	+ 1' 04"
4	Domenico Pozzovivo (ITA)	Bahrain–Merida	+ 1' 18"
5	Richard Carapaz (ECU)	Movistar Team	+ 1' 56"
6	George Bennett (NZL)	LottoNL–Jumbo	+ 2' 09"
7	Rohan Dennis (AUS)	BMC Racing Team	+ 2' 36"
8	Pello Bilbao (ESP)	Astana	+ 2' 54"
9	Patrick Konrad (AUT)	Bora–Hansgrohe	+ 2' 55"
10	Fabio Aru (ITA)	UAE Team Emirates	+ 3' 10"
