= 2020 Gran Piemonte =

2020 UCI Europe Tour 2020 UCI ProSeries

Race details
- Dates: August 12
- Stages: 1
- Distance: 187 km (116.2 mi)
- Winning time: 4h 38' 23"

Results
	Winner	George Bennett (NZL)	(Team Jumbo–Visma)
	Second	Diego Ulissi (ITA)	(UAE Team Emirates)
	Third	Mathieu van der Poel (NED)	(Alpecin–Fenix)

The 2020 Gran Piemonte was the 104th edition of the Gran Piemonte (known as Giro del Piemonte until 2009) single-day cycling race. It was held on 12 August, over a distance of 187 km, starting in Santo Stefano Belbo and ending in Barolo.

The race was won by George Bennett of Team Jumbo–Visma.

== Teams ==
Eighteen teams were invited to take part in the race. These included eleven UCI WorldTeams, six UCI ProTeams and the Italian national team.

UCI WorldTeams

- Astana
- CCC Team
- Deceuninck–Quick-Step
- Israel Start-Up Nation
- Mitchelton–Scott
- NTT Pro Cycling
- Movistar Team
- Joker Fuel of Norway
- Trek–Segafredo
- UAE Team Emirates
- Ineos Grenadiers

UCI ProTeams

- Alpecin–Fenix
- Androni Giocattoli–Sidermec
- Bardiani–CSF–Faizanè
- Circus–Wanty Gobert
- Gazprom–RusVelo
- Vini Zabù–KTM

National team

- Italy

== Results ==
Result
Rank	Rider	Team	Time
1	George Bennett (NZL)	Team Jumbo–Visma	4h 38' 23"
2	Diego Ulissi (ITA)	UAE Team Emirates	+ 0"
3	Mathieu van der Poel (NED)	Alpecin–Fenix	+ 4"
4	Aleksandr Vlasov (RUS)	Astana	+ 4"
5	Simon Geschke (GER)	CCC Team	+ 4"
6	Alex Aranburu (ESP)	Astana	+ 4"
7	Dries Devenyns (BEL)	Deceuninck–Quick-Step	+ 4"
8	Robert Stannard (AUS)	Mitchelton–Scott	+ 7"
9	Giulio Ciccone (ITA)	Trek–Segafredo	+ 7"
10	Attila Valter (HUN)	CCC Team	+ 7"
