= Monte Zoncolan =

Mountain in Italy

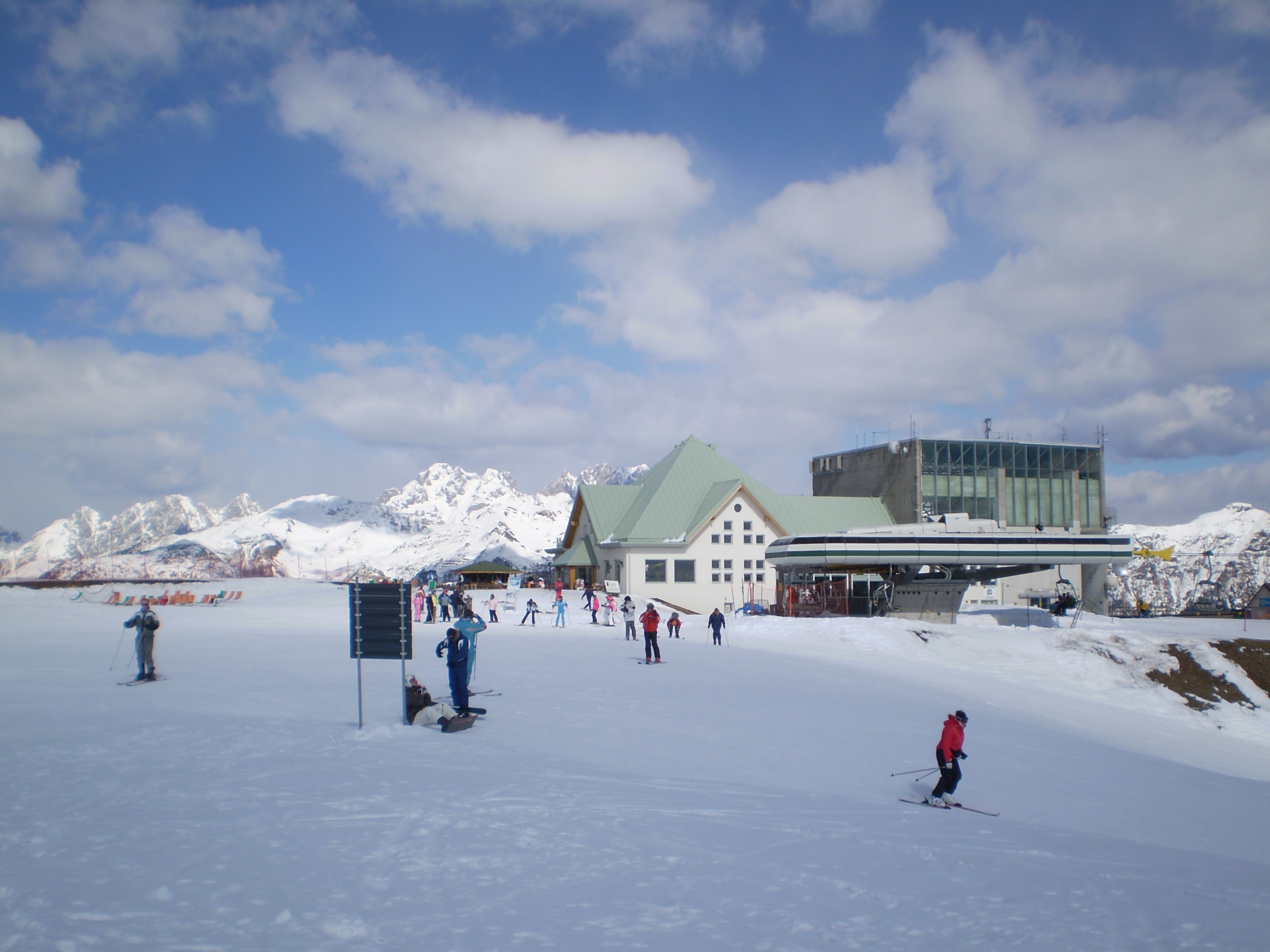

Highest point
- Elevation: 1,750 m (5,740 ft)
- Coordinates: 46°30′0″N 12°55′0″E

Geography
- Location within Alps
- Location: Italy
- Parent range: Carnic Alps

Monte Zoncolan (Italian pronunciation: [ˈmonte ddzoŋkoˈlan]) is a mountain in the Carnic Alps, located in the region of Friuli-Venezia Giulia, Italy, with an elevation of 1,750 metres (5,740 ft). It is one of the most demanding climbs in professional road bicycle racing, having been used in the Giro d'Italia seven times (2003, 2007, 2010, 2011, 2014, 2018, 2021) and the Giro d'Italia Femminile twice (1997, 2018). Gilberto Simoni was the winner of the first two stages finishing on Monte Zoncolan in the men's Giro while Ivan Basso won in 2010, Igor Antón won in 2011, Michael Rogers won in 2014 and Fabiana Luperini won at the first visit in the women's race. Chris Froome won the stage in 2018 Giro d'Italia (stage 14).

The mountain also holds the ski resort of Ravascletto with 22 km of slopes and a skiable height between 950 and 2000 m.

== Details of the climb ==
The mountain can be climbed on three roads: one from Ovaro, another from Sutrio, and a third from Priola.

- West from Ovaro: This is a very demanding climb, and one of the most difficult in Europe, usually compared to the Alto de El Angliru. It was featured for the first time in the 2007 Giro d'Italia. The climb starts in Ovaro in the Gorto valley, and is 10.1 kilometres (6.3 mi) long at an average of 11.9% with an elevation gain of 1,210 metres (3,970 ft) and a maximum gradient of 22%. The real climb however starts at Liariis, 8.5 kilometres (5.3 mi) from the summit. Shortly after the village, the road disappears into forest and gains 900 metres (3,000 ft) in the next 6 kilometres (3.7 mi), averaging thus 15%. After this section, the road passes through three short tunnels, before a series of steep switchbacks immediately beneath the summit. The former rough asphalt between Liariis and the tunnels was replaced in 2007; that between the last tunnel and the summit had already been resurfaced by autumn 2005. The tunnels are now lit.

Profile of Monte Zoncolan from Sutrio.

- East from Sutrio: This route is less demanding than the road from Ovaro but it is also one of Italy's most challenging climbs. It was featured for the first time in the 1997 Giro d'Italia Femminile and later in the 2003 Giro d'Italia. The actual climb to the summit starts at Sutrio and is 13.5 kilometres (8.4 mi) long at an average of 9% with an elevation gain of 1,210 metres (3,970 ft) and a maximum gradient being 23%. The first 8.7 kilometres (5.4 mi) have an average gradient of 8.7%, followed by a false flat after this section. The most demanding section is the final 3.5 kilometres (2.2 mi) with an average gradient of 13% and the initial part of the final kilometre at 22% grade.
- East from Priola: This is the original old road which was replaced by the newer road from Sutrio described above. The two roads combine around 4 kilometres (2.5 mi) below the summit. The road from Priola was first asphalted in autumn 2005. From bottom to top, the 8.9 kilometres (5.5 mi) long road gains 1,140 metres (3,740 ft), meaning an average gradient of 12.8%. The lower part has sharp hairpin bends and is at times very steep. The climb is briefly flat after merging with the newer road, with the remaining 3.5 kilometres (2.2 mi) containing several ramps of up to 23% steepness.

Profile of Monte Zoncolan from Ovaro.

== Giro d'Italia ==
Monte Zoncolan has been featured in the men's Giro d'Italia seven times so far. The first time was in the 12th stage of the 2003 Giro d'Italia, won by Gilberto Simoni, using the road from Sutrio, at the east side of Monte Zoncolan. It was also the last time that Marco Pantani was seen fighting for a stage victory in the Giro d'Italia, launching an unsuccessful attack 3 kilometres from the finish line and finishing in fifth place, forty-two seconds behind Simoni. Prior to this edition, the climb was used in 10th stage of the 1997 Giro d'Italia Femminile, where Fabiana Luperini won en route to the third of her five overall victories.

Monte Zoncolan was featured for a second time in 17th stage of the 2007 Giro d'Italia, also won by Gilberto Simoni, but this time using the more demanding road from Ovaro. The climb featured once again in the 15th stage of the 2010 Giro d'Italia and Ivan Basso won the stage, that would eventually prove to be the deciding stage of that year's Giro d'Italia. Zoncolan featured in the 2011 Giro d'Italia, during the 14th stage, which was won by Igor Antón, followed by Alberto Contador and Vincenzo Nibali. The Zoncolan was featured in the 2014 Giro d'Italia, during the 20th stage, which was won by Michael Rogers. Most recently, stage 14 of the 2018 Giro d'Italia finished with dramatic, brutal climb up the Zoncolan from Ovaro. It was Chris Froome's first stage win of the 2018 Giro.

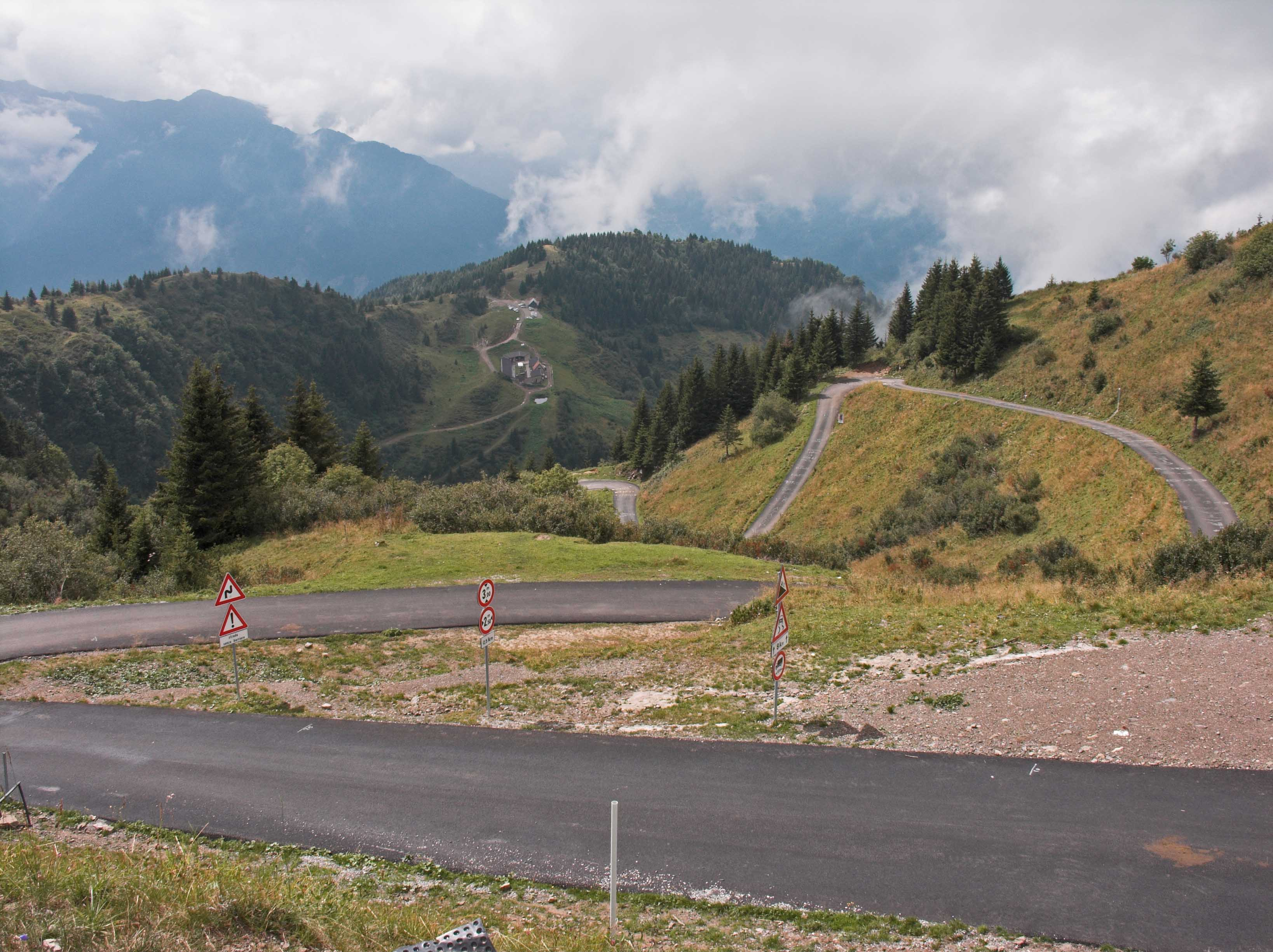
Monte Zoncolan near the summit.

=== Winners of Monte Zoncolan stage at the Giro d'Italia ===
Year	Stage	Name	Side
2003	12	Gilberto Simoni (ITA)	Sutrio
2007	17	Gilberto Simoni (ITA)	Ovaro
2010	15	Ivan Basso (ITA)	Ovaro
2011	14	Igor Antón (ESP)	Ovaro
2014	20	Michael Rogers (AUS)	Ovaro
2018	14	Chris Froome (GBR)	Ovaro
2021	14	Lorenzo Fortunato (ITA)	Sutrio

=== Winners of Monte Zoncolan stage at the Giro d'Italia Femminile ===
Year	Stage	Name	Side
1997	10	Fabiana Luperini (ITA)	Sutrio
2018	9	Annemiek van Vleuten (NED)	Ovaro
