= Simone Andreetta =

Italian cyclist (born 1993)

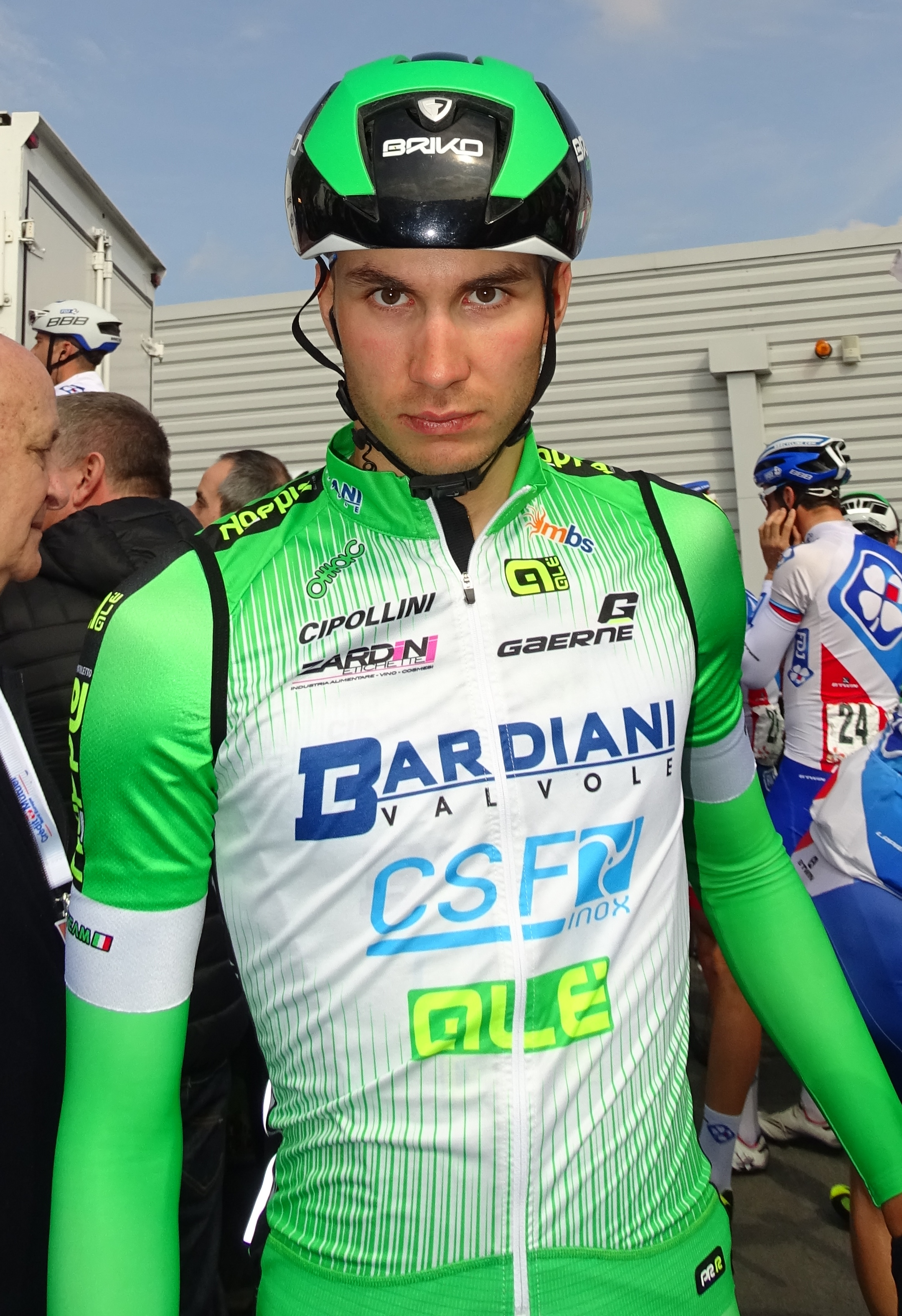
- Andreetta in 2016

Personal information
- Born: 30 August 1993 (age 33) Vittorio Veneto, Italy

Cycling career
- Sport: Cycling
- Current team: Retired
- Discipline: Road
- Role: Rider
- Rider type: Rouleur

Amateur team
- 2012–2014: Zalf Euromobil

Professional team
- 2015–2018: Bardiani–CSF

Simone Andreetta (born 30 August 1993) is an Italian former professional racing cyclist, who rode for UCI Professional Continental team Bardiani–CSF from 2015 until 2018. He was named in the start list for the 2016 Giro d'Italia.

== Major results ==
2011
2nd Overall Giro della Lunigiana

1st Stage 2

2012
10th Giro del Belvedere
2013
2nd Trofeo Banca Popolare di Vicenza
5th Gran Premio di Poggiana
2014
1st Giro del Belvedere
2nd Road race, National Under-23 Road Championships
3rd Trofeo Città di San Vendemiano
4th Gran Premio di Poggiana
6th Overall Giro del Friuli-Venezia Giulia

1st Mountains classification
1st Young rider classification
1st Stage 4

2016
8th Gran Premio di Lugano
2018
8th Giro dell'Appennino

=== Grand Tour general classification results timeline ===
Grand Tour	2016	2017	2018
Giro d'Italia	141	156	125
Tour de France	—	—	—
Vuelta a España	—	—	—

Legend
—	Did not compete
DNF	Did not finish
