= 2018 Giro d'Italia, Stage 12 to Stage 21 =

Detailed stage results of a cycling grand tour

The 2018 Giro d'Italia was the 101st edition of the Giro d'Italia, one of cycling's Grand Tours. The first half of the Giro began in Jerusalem, Israel, on 4 May with an individual time trial, while the second half's Stage 12, a hilly stage starting from Osimo, took place on 17 May. The race concluded in Rome on 27 May.

== Stage 12 ==
17 May 2018 – Osimo to Imola, 214 km (133 mi)

Stage 12 result
Rank	Rider	Team	Time
1	Sam Bennett (IRL)	Bora–Hansgrohe	4h 49' 34"
2	Danny van Poppel (NED)	LottoNL–Jumbo	+ 0"
3	Niccolò Bonifazio (ITA)	Bahrain–Merida	+ 0"
4	Baptiste Planckaert (BEL)	Team Katusha–Alpecin	+ 0"
5	Jürgen Roelandts (BEL)	BMC Racing Team	+ 0"
6	Michael Mørkøv (DEN)	Quick-Step Floors	+ 0"
7	Manuel Belletti (ITA)	Androni Giocattoli–Sidermec	+ 0"
8	Clément Venturini (FRA)	AG2R La Mondiale	+ 0"
9	Florian Sénéchal (FRA)	Quick-Step Floors	+ 0"
10	Enrico Battaglin (ITA)	LottoNL–Jumbo	+ 0"

General classification after Stage 12
Rank	Rider	Team	Time
1	Simon Yates (GBR)	Mitchelton–Scott	51h 57' 55"
2	Tom Dumoulin (NED)	Team Sunweb	+ 47"
3	Thibaut Pinot (FRA)	Groupama–FDJ	+ 1' 04"
4	Domenico Pozzovivo (ITA)	Bahrain–Merida	+ 1' 18"
5	Richard Carapaz (ECU)	Movistar Team	+ 1' 56"
6	George Bennett (NZL)	LottoNL–Jumbo	+ 2' 09"
7	Rohan Dennis (AUS)	BMC Racing Team	+ 2' 36"
8	Pello Bilbao (ESP)	Astana	+ 2' 54"
9	Patrick Konrad (AUT)	Bora–Hansgrohe	+ 2' 55"
10	Fabio Aru (ITA)	UAE Team Emirates	+ 3' 10"

== Stage 13 ==
18 May 2018 – Ferrara to Nervesa della Battaglia, 180 km (110 mi)

Stage 13 result
Rank	Rider	Team	Time
1	Elia Viviani (ITA)	Quick-Step Floors	3h 56' 25"
2	Sam Bennett (IRL)	Bora–Hansgrohe	+ 0"
3	Danny van Poppel (NED)	LottoNL–Jumbo	+ 0"
4	Sacha Modolo (ITA)	EF Education First–Drapac	+ 0"
5	Ryan Gibbons (RSA)	Team Dimension Data	+ 0"
6	Jean-Pierre Drucker (LUX)	BMC Racing Team	+ 0"
7	Manuel Belletti (ITA)	Androni Giocattoli–Sidermec	+ 0"
8	Clément Venturini (FRA)	AG2R La Mondiale	+ 0"
9	Baptiste Planckaert (BEL)	Team Katusha–Alpecin	+ 0"
10	Jens Debusschere (BEL)	Lotto–FixAll	+ 0"

General classification after Stage 13
Rank	Rider	Team	Time
1	Simon Yates (GBR)	Mitchelton–Scott	55h 54' 20"
2	Tom Dumoulin (NED)	Team Sunweb	+ 47"
3	Thibaut Pinot (FRA)	Groupama–FDJ	+ 1' 04"
4	Domenico Pozzovivo (ITA)	Bahrain–Merida	+ 1' 18"
5	Richard Carapaz (ECU)	Movistar Team	+ 1' 56"
6	George Bennett (NZL)	LottoNL–Jumbo	+ 2' 09"
7	Rohan Dennis (AUS)	BMC Racing Team	+ 2' 36"
8	Pello Bilbao (ESP)	Astana	+ 2' 54"
9	Patrick Konrad (AUT)	Bora–Hansgrohe	+ 2' 55"
10	Fabio Aru (ITA)	UAE Team Emirates	+ 3' 10"

== Stage 14 ==
19 May 2018 – San Vito al Tagliamento to Monte Zoncolan, 186 km (116 mi)

The stage departed north, through Dignano, to the 2.75 km (1.71 mi) Category 3 climb of the Monte di Ragogna. The descent was followed by an intermediate sprint at Forgaria nel Friuli. The route then turned east, then north and finally west to the 4.55 km (2.83 mi) Category 3 climb to Avaglio and a descent east through Caneva. An intermediate sprint followed at Paularo, which was immediately followed by the 4.4 km (2.7 mi) Category 2 climb of the Passo Duron. After a descent to Sutrio, the riders climbed the 7.6 km (4.7 mi) Category 3 route to Sella Valcalda in Ravascletto. The race then descended through Comeglians and began the 10.1 km (6.3 mi) Category 1 climb of Monte Zoncolan, east from Ovaro, to 1,730 m (5,680 ft) at the finish line.

Stage 14 result
Rank	Rider	Team	Time
1	Chris Froome (GBR)	Team Sky	5h 25' 31"
2	Simon Yates (GBR)	Mitchelton–Scott	+ 6"
3	Domenico Pozzovivo (ITA)	Bahrain–Merida	+ 23"
4	Miguel Ángel López (COL)	Astana	+ 25"
5	Tom Dumoulin (NED)	Team Sunweb	+ 37"
6	Thibaut Pinot (FRA)	Groupama–FDJ	+ 42"
7	Wout Poels (NED)	Team Sky	+ 1' 07"
8	Sebastien Reichenbach (SUI)	Groupama–FDJ	+ 1' 19"
9	Pello Bilbao (ESP)	Astana	+ 1' 35"
10	Michael Woods (CAN)	EF Education First-Drapac	+ 1' 43"

General classification after Stage 14
Rank	Rider	Team	Time
1	Simon Yates (GBR)	Mitchelton–Scott	61h 19' 51"
2	Tom Dumoulin (NED)	Team Sunweb	+ 1' 24"
3	Domenico Pozzovivo (ITA)	Bahrain–Merida	+ 1' 37"
4	Thibaut Pinot (FRA)	Groupama–FDJ	+ 1' 46"
5	Chris Froome (GBR)	Team Sky	+ 3' 10"
6	Miguel Ángel López (COL)	Astana	+ 3' 42"
7	Richard Carapaz (ECU)	Movistar Team	+ 3' 56"
8	George Bennett (NZL)	LottoNL–Jumbo	+ 4' 04"
9	Pello Bilbao (ESP)	Astana	+ 4' 29"
10	Patrick Konrad (AUT)	Bora–Hansgrohe	+ 4' 43"

== Stage 15 ==
20 May 2018 – Tolmezzo to Sappada, 176 km (109 mi)

Stage 15 result
Rank	Rider	Team	Time
1	Simon Yates (GBR)	Mitchelton–Scott	4h 37' 56"
2	Miguel Ángel López (COL)	Astana	+ 41"
3	Tom Dumoulin (NED)	Team Sunweb	+ 41"
4	Domenico Pozzovivo (ITA)	Bahrain–Merida	+ 41"
5	Richard Carapaz (ECU)	Movistar Team	+ 41"
6	Thibaut Pinot (FRA)	Groupama–FDJ	+ 41"
7	Alexandre Geniez (FRA)	AG2R La Mondiale	+ 1' 20"
8	Davide Formolo (ITA)	Bora–Hansgrohe	+ 1' 20"
9	Pello Bilbao (ESP)	Astana	+ 1' 20"
10	Sam Oomen (NED)	Team Sunweb	+ 1' 20"

General classification after Stage 15
Rank	Rider	Team	Time
1	Simon Yates (GBR)	Mitchelton–Scott	65h 57' 37"
2	Tom Dumoulin (NED)	Team Sunweb	+ 2' 11"
3	Domenico Pozzovivo (ITA)	Bahrain–Merida	+ 2' 28"
4	Thibaut Pinot (FRA)	Groupama–FDJ	+ 2' 37"
5	Miguel Ángel López (COL)	Astana	+ 4' 27"
6	Richard Carapaz (ECU)	Movistar Team	+ 4' 47"
7	Chris Froome (GBR)	Team Sky	+ 4' 52"
8	George Bennett (NZL)	LottoNL–Jumbo	+ 5' 34"
9	Pello Bilbao (ESP)	Astana	+ 5' 59"
10	Patrick Konrad (AUT)	Bora–Hansgrohe	+ 6' 13"

== Rest day 3 ==
21 May 2018 – Trento

== Stage 16 ==
22 May 2018 – Trento to Rovereto, 34.2 km (21.3 mi) (ITT)

A number of riders were penalised for drafting during the stage including Fabio Aru and Diego Ulissi who finished in the top ten.

Stage 16 result
Rank	Rider	Team	Time
1	Rohan Dennis (AUS)	BMC Racing Team	40' 00"
2	Tony Martin (GER)	Team Katusha–Alpecin	+ 14"
3	Tom Dumoulin (NED)	Team Sunweb	+ 22"
4	Jos van Emden (NED)	LottoNL–Jumbo	+ 27"
5	Chris Froome (GBR)	Team Sky	+ 35"
6	Alex Dowsett (GBR)	Team Katusha–Alpecin	+ 40"
7	Chad Haga (USA)	Team Sunweb	+ 47"
8	Fabio Aru (ITA)	UAE Team Emirates	+ 57"
9	David de la Cruz (ESP)	Team Sky	+ 1' 01"
10	Vasil Kiryienka (BLR)	Team Sky	+ 1' 04"

General classification after Stage 16
Rank	Rider	Team	Time
1	Simon Yates (GBR)	Mitchelton–Scott	66h 39' 14"
2	Tom Dumoulin (NED)	Team Sunweb	+ 56"
3	Domenico Pozzovivo (ITA)	Bahrain–Merida	+ 3' 11"
4	Chris Froome (GBR)	Team Sky	+ 3' 50"
5	Thibaut Pinot (FRA)	Groupama–FDJ	+ 4' 19"
6	Rohan Dennis (AUS)	BMC Racing Team	+ 5' 04"
7	Miguel Ángel López (COL)	Astana	+ 5' 37"
8	Pello Bilbao (ESP)	Astana	+ 6' 02"
9	Richard Carapaz (ECU)	Movistar Team	+ 6' 07"
10	George Bennett (NZL)	LottoNL–Jumbo	+ 7' 01"

== Stage 17 ==
23 May 2018 – Riva del Garda to Iseo, 149.5 km (92.9 mi)

Stage 17 result
Rank	Rider	Team	Time
1	Elia Viviani (ITA)	Quick-Step Floors	3h 19' 57"
2	Sam Bennett (IRL)	Bora–Hansgrohe	+ 0"
3	Niccolò Bonifazio (ITA)	Bahrain–Merida	+ 0"
4	Danny van Poppel (NED)	LottoNL–Jumbo	+ 0"
5	Jens Debusschere (BEL)	Lotto–FixAll	+ 0"
6	Kristian Sbaragli (ITA)	Israel Cycling Academy	+ 0"
7	Jean-Pierre Drucker (LUX)	BMC Racing Team	+ 0"
8	Sacha Modolo (ITA)	EF Education First–Drapac	+ 0"
9	Andrea Vendrame (ITA)	Androni Giocattoli–Sidermec	+ 0"
10	José Gonçalves (POR)	Team Katusha–Alpecin	+ 0"

General classification after Stage 17
Rank	Rider	Team	Time
1	Simon Yates (GBR)	Mitchelton–Scott	69h 59' 11"
2	Tom Dumoulin (NED)	Team Sunweb	+ 56"
3	Domenico Pozzovivo (ITA)	Bahrain–Merida	+ 3' 11"
4	Chris Froome (GBR)	Team Sky	+ 3' 50"
5	Thibaut Pinot (FRA)	Groupama–FDJ	+ 4' 19"
6	Rohan Dennis (AUS)	BMC Racing Team	+ 5' 04"
7	Miguel Ángel López (COL)	Astana	+ 5' 37"
8	Pello Bilbao (ESP)	Astana	+ 6' 02"
9	Richard Carapaz (ECU)	Movistar Team	+ 6' 07"
10	George Bennett (NZL)	LottoNL–Jumbo	+ 7' 01"

== Stage 18 ==
24 May 2018 – Abbiategrasso to Prato Nevoso, 196 km (122 mi)

Stage 18 result
Rank	Rider	Team	Time
1	Maximilian Schachmann (GER)	Quick-Step Floors	4h 55' 42"
2	Rubén Plaza (ESP)	Israel Cycling Academy	+ 10"
3	Mattia Cattaneo (ITA)	Androni Giocattoli–Sidermec	+ 16"
4	Christoph Pfingsten (GER)	Bora–Hansgrohe	+ 1' 10"
5	Marco Marcato (ITA)	UAE Team Emirates	+ 1' 26"
6	Michael Mørkøv (DEN)	Quick-Step Floors	+ 1' 36"
7	Viacheslav Kuznetsov (RUS)	Team Katusha–Alpecin	+ 1' 52"
8	Jos van Emden (NED)	LottoNL–Jumbo	+ 3' 22"
9	Alex Turrin (ITA)	Wilier Triestina–Selle Italia	+ 3' 29"
10	Davide Ballerini (ITA)	Androni Giocattoli–Sidermec	+ 5' 09"

General classification after Stage 18
Rank	Rider	Team	Time
1	Simon Yates (GBR)	Mitchelton–Scott	75h 06' 24"
2	Tom Dumoulin (NED)	Team Sunweb	+ 28"
3	Domenico Pozzovivo (ITA)	Bahrain–Merida	+ 2' 43"
4	Chris Froome (GBR)	Team Sky	+ 3' 22"
5	Thibaut Pinot (FRA)	Groupama–FDJ	+ 4' 24"
6	Miguel Ángel López (COL)	Astana	+ 4' 54"
7	Rohan Dennis (AUS)	BMC Racing Team	+ 5' 09"
8	Pello Bilbao (ESP)	Astana	+ 5' 54"
9	Richard Carapaz (ECU)	Movistar Team	+ 5' 59"
10	Patrick Konrad (AUT)	Bora–Hansgrohe	+ 7' 05"

== Stage 19 ==
25 May 2018 – Venaria Reale to Bardonecchia, 185 km (115 mi)

Stage 19 result
Rank	Rider	Team	Time
1	Chris Froome (GBR)	Team Sky	5h 12' 26"
2	Richard Carapaz (ECU)	Movistar Team	+ 3' 00"
3	Thibaut Pinot (FRA)	Groupama–FDJ	+ 3' 07"
4	Miguel Ángel López (COL)	Astana	+ 3' 12"
5	Tom Dumoulin (NED)	Team Sunweb	+ 3' 23"
6	Sébastien Reichenbach (SUI)	Groupama–FDJ	+ 6' 13"
7	Davide Formolo (ITA)	Bora–Hansgrohe	+ 8' 22"
8	Sam Oomen (NED)	Team Sunweb	+ 8' 23"
9	Patrick Konrad (AUT)	Bora–Hansgrohe	+ 8' 23"
10	Pello Bilbao (ESP)	Astana	+ 8' 23"

General classification after Stage 19
Rank	Rider	Team	Time
1	Chris Froome (GBR)	Team Sky	80h 21' 59"
2	Tom Dumoulin (NED)	Team Sunweb	+ 40"
3	Thibaut Pinot (FRA)	Groupama–FDJ	+ 4' 17"
4	Miguel Ángel López (COL)	Astana	+ 4' 57"
5	Richard Carapaz (ECU)	Movistar Team	+ 5' 44"
6	Domenico Pozzovivo (ITA)	Bahrain–Merida	+ 8' 03"
7	Pello Bilbao (ESP)	Astana	+ 11' 08"
8	Patrick Konrad (AUT)	Bora–Hansgrohe	+ 12' 19"
9	George Bennett (NZL)	LottoNL–Jumbo	+ 12' 35"
10	Sam Oomen (NED)	Team Sunweb	+ 14' 18"

== Stage 20 ==
26 May 2018 – Susa to Cervinia, 214 km (133 mi)

Stage 20 result
Rank	Rider	Team	Time
1	Mikel Nieve (ESP)	Mitchelton–Scott	5h 43' 48"
2	Robert Gesink (NED)	LottoNL–Jumbo	+ 2' 17"
3	Felix Großschartner (AUT)	Bora–Hansgrohe	+ 2' 42"
4	Giulio Ciccone (ITA)	Bardiani–CSF	+ 3' 45"
5	Gianluca Brambilla (ITA)	Trek–Segafredo	+ 5' 23"
6	Wout Poels (NED)	Team Sky	+ 6' 03"
7	Chris Froome (GBR)	Team Sky	+ 6' 03"
8	Davide Formolo (ITA)	Bora–Hansgrohe	+ 6' 03"
9	Domenico Pozzovivo (ITA)	Bahrain–Merida	+ 6' 03"
10	Richard Carapaz (ECU)	Movistar Team	+ 6' 03"

General classification after Stage 20
Rank	Rider	Team	Time
1	Chris Froome (GBR)	Team Sky	86h 11' 50"
2	Tom Dumoulin (NED)	Team Sunweb	+ 46"
3	Miguel Ángel López (COL)	Astana	+ 4' 57"
4	Richard Carapaz (ECU)	Movistar Team	+ 5' 44"
5	Domenico Pozzovivo (ITA)	Bahrain–Merida	+ 8' 03"
6	Pello Bilbao (ESP)	Astana	+ 11' 50"
7	Patrick Konrad (AUT)	Bora–Hansgrohe	+ 13' 01"
8	George Bennett (NZL)	LottoNL–Jumbo	+ 13' 17"
9	Sam Oomen (NED)	Team Sunweb	+ 14' 18"
10	Davide Formolo (ITA)	Bora–Hansgrohe	+ 15' 16"

== Stage 21 ==
27 May 2018 – Rome to Rome, 115 km (71 mi)

Stage 21 result
Rank	Rider	Team	Time
1	Sam Bennett (IRL)	Bora–Hansgrohe	2h 50' 49"
2	Elia Viviani (ITA)	Quick-Step Floors	+ 0"
3	Jean-Pierre Drucker (LUX)	BMC Racing Team	+ 0"
4	Baptiste Planckaert (BEL)	Team Katusha–Alpecin	+ 0"
5	Manuel Belletti (ITA)	Androni Giocattoli–Sidermec	+ 0"
6	Sacha Modolo (ITA)	EF Education First–Drapac	+ 0"
7	Niccolo Bonifazio (ITA)	Bahrain–Merida	+ 0"
8	Clément Venturini (FRA)	AG2R La Mondiale	+ 0"
10	Paolo Simion (ITA)	Bardiani–CSF	+ 0"
10	Fabio Sabatini (ITA)	Quick-Step Floors	+ 0"

General classification after Stage 21
Rank	Rider	Team	Time
1	Chris Froome (GBR)	Team Sky	89h 02' 39"
2	Tom Dumoulin (NED)	Team Sunweb	+ 46"
3	Miguel Ángel López (COL)	Astana	+ 4' 57"
4	Richard Carapaz (ECU)	Movistar Team	+ 5' 44"
5	Domenico Pozzovivo (ITA)	Bahrain–Merida	+ 8' 03"
6	Pello Bilbao (ESP)	Astana	+ 11' 50"
7	Patrick Konrad (AUT)	Bora–Hansgrohe	+ 13' 01"
8	George Bennett (NZL)	LottoNL–Jumbo	+ 13' 17"
9	Sam Oomen (NED)	Team Sunweb	+ 14' 18"
10	Davide Formolo (ITA)	Bora–Hansgrohe	+ 15' 16"
