= George Bennett (cyclist) =

New Zealand road cyclist

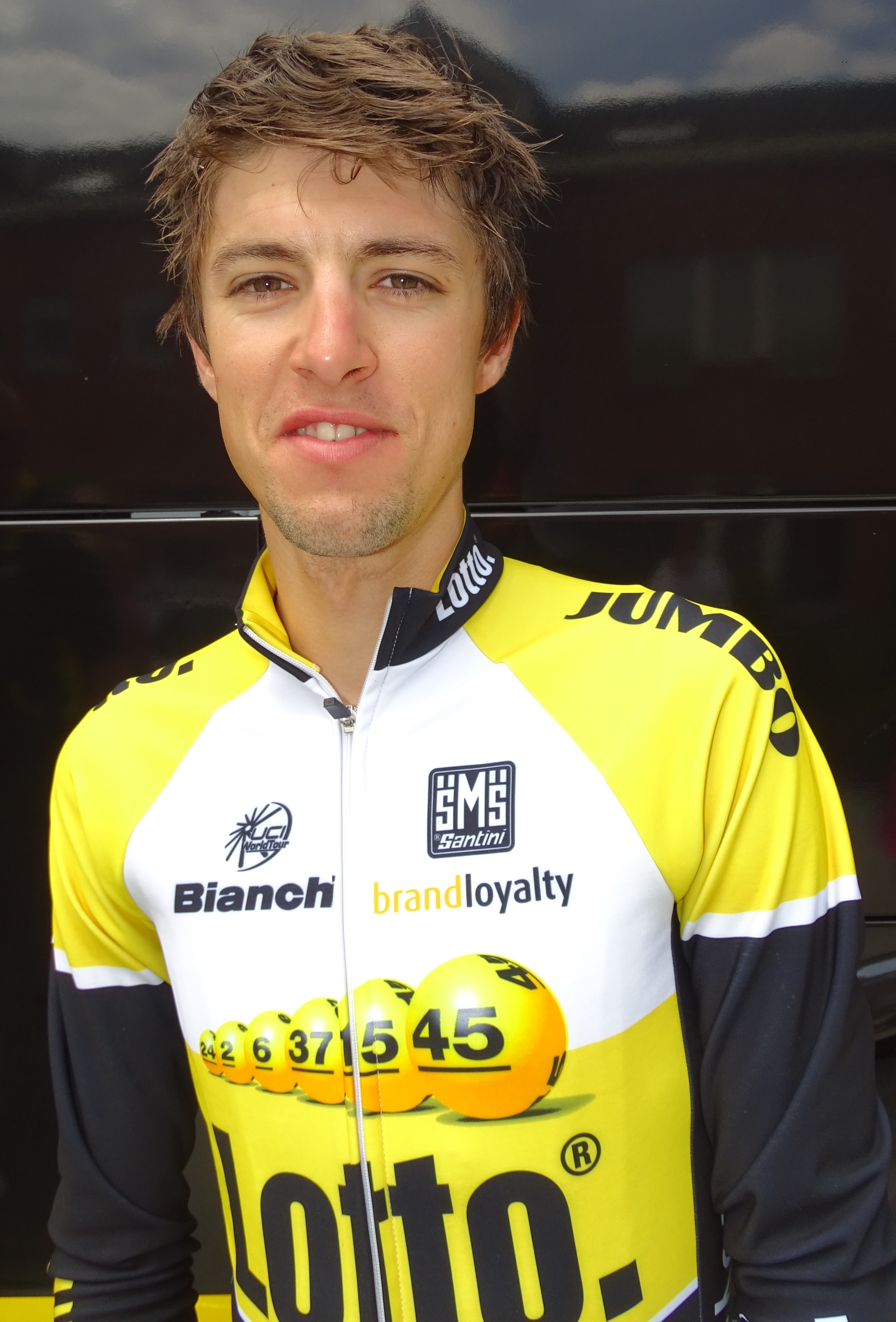
- Bennett at the 2015 Tour of Belgium

Personal information
- Full name: George Bennett
- Born: 7 April 1990 (age 36) Nelson, New Zealand
- Height: 1.80 m (5 ft 11 in)
- Weight: 58 kg (128 lb)

Cycling career
- Sport: Cycling
- Current team: NSN Cycling Team
- Discipline: Road
- Role: Rider
- Rider type: Climber

Amateur teams
- 2010: Club Routier des 4 Chemins
- 2011: Trek–Livestrong
- 2011: Team RadioShack (stagiaire)

Professional teams
- 2012–2013: RadioShack–Nissan
- 2014: Cannondale
- 2015–2021: LottoNL–Jumbo
- 2022–2023: UAE Team Emirates
- 2024–: Israel–Premier Tech

Major wins
- Grand Tours Tour de France 1 TTT stage (2019) Stage races Tour of California (2017) One day races and Classics National Road Race Championships (2021, 2026) Gran Piemonte (2020)

George Bennett (born 7 April 1990) is a New Zealand professional road racing cyclist, who currently rides for UCI ProTeam NSN Cycling Team. He represented New Zealand at the 2016 and 2020 Summer Olympics. He was the winner of the 2017 Tour of California, the 2020 Gran Piemonte and the 2021 New Zealand road cycling championships. He came second in the 2020 Il Lombardia. Bennett has competed in 17 Grand Tours.

== Career ==
Bennett was born in Nelson in 1990, where he was educated at Waimea College. He originally took up cycle racing as a mountain biker, moving to Switzerland in 2009 to pursue his amateur career. Bennett turned professional in 2012.

In 2013, George Bennett nearly won the New Zealand road cycling championships. The 183.7 kilometre race in Christchurch had 10 climbs up the steep Dyers Pass road and Bennett was leading by 45 seconds over Hayden Roulston with the final flat 12 kilometres to go. Roulston was able to chase down Bennett and pass him on the line. Bennett commented that "I had everybody on the hill, but 21km solo [on the flat], when you're like me on a really windy day like this, it's just too far".

He competed with the RadioShack–Nissan squad for two seasons before moving to Cannondale in 2014.

=== 2015 ===
In October 2014, it was announced that he would join LottoNL–Jumbo for the 2015 season. In May 2015, he was barred from starting the Giro d'Italia due to low cortisol levels (later discovered to have been caused by illness), as per Mouvement pour un cyclisme crédible (MPCC) rules. He was not replaced by his team.

=== 2016 ===
George Bennett was named in the start list for the 2016 Tour de France and finished in 53rd place. His most impressive performance in the Tour de France was finishing seventh on stage nine at Andorre Arcalis, judged by some as the toughest stage that year. He commented that "You are there in front of millions of people and it is some kind of dream. Especially that first stage, stage 9 where I was seventh. You start attacking them 30km from the line and think you are going to maybe get a result or something. It is good for growing and good for learning but I wouldn’t do that again. I really did enjoy it. I definitely felt the pressure, though, not personally, but you could sense a different atmosphere at the Tour. You could feel that people were a lot more stressed and things like that. I didn’t take any of that stress on because I was there as last minute call up and everything I did was a bonus really."

George Bennett competed in the Men's individual road race at the 2016 Summer Olympics and came 33rd; he described the race as "absolutely" the toughest in his career, and 79 riders did not finish.

After the Olympics, He was selected to ride in the 2016 Vuelta a España as a support rider for Steven Kruijswijk . When Kruijswijk withdrew, Bennett became the team leader. On stage 14, Bennett made the breakaway and came 4th in the mountainous stage to Aubisque 31 seconds behind the stage winner Robert Gesink. He came 25th in the time trial on stage 19 to improve his overall standing to 10th on general classification, the highest ever placing for a New Zealander in a grand tour. Bennett said that the season "started off reasonable and just got better and better...It's pretty hard to go past tenth at the Vuelta on a results base. That was pretty special".

=== 2017 - Victory in the Tour of California ===
George Bennett was forced off the bike after contracting glandular fever, and this meant that he missed the 2017 New Zealand National road race championships and the Tour Down Under.

In 2017, George Bennett became the first New Zealander to win the general classification at a UCI World Tour cycling event, when he won the Tour of California. After making the breakaway, he came second in the hilly stage 2. On the uphill finish, Bennett got away with Rafal Majka and finished two seconds down on the stage. He said of the stage, "We all worked together well. We had the same ambitions...None of us can beat [Andrew] Talansky in a time trial so we wanted to put space between us." In stage 5 where the stage finished at the top of Mt Baldy, Bennett came third, two seconds behind Andrew Talansky and Rafal Majka, leaving him in second place over all. The individual time trial (stage 6) became the stage that would decide the Tour of California Bennett, finished fourth in the 24 km time trial which put him into the race lead with a 35-second gap back to Rafal Majka.

Bennett said "I was riding and I didn’t hear much over the radio, then just about halfway my director suddenly lit up and just got super excited, yelling in my ear and I knew that something was happening. It wasn’t really until a couple of K to go that I really stepped into it. I crossed the line and knew I had a good time. I was like third or fourth or something. I was waiting for the clock to tick down and it was a pretty nervous few minutes."

Bennett also entered the Tour de France, and finished 7th on Stage 9, but retired midway through stage 16 when he came down with gastroenteritis. He returned to Girona to recover. He described the 2017 Tour de France as the highlight of his career saying "I was up there coming into the last week and then I got sick. So it was the best and the worst. It was this breakthrough stage for me; suddenly I was in the front group with Richie Porte and Chris Froome. I felt like I’d broken through with the big boys. It was this magic moment in my life where I thought I can be a GC rider at a Grand Tour."

=== 2018 ===
With good early season form (4th New Zealand National road race championship, 11th Santos Tour Down Under, 9th Tirreno-Adriatico, 6th Volta Ciclista a Catalunya) George Bennett achieved his highest GC result in a Grand Tour when he came in eighth place overall in the 2018 Giro d'Italia. Bennett was disappointed with the result, having hoped for a higher place. He said of it "I came here for a lot more than that. But that's all I could do in the end. I'll take it and it's better than 11th. At the start of the Giro I wouldn't have signed up for it but some things were out of my control and maybe I got the build up wrong as I was a bit too good too soon."

In August, he rode the Tour de Pologne, coming third on stage four and seventh on stage six to finish in fourth place on general classification, 24 seconds behind the winner Michal Kwiatkowski.

George Bennett competed at the World Road Cycling Championships at Innsbrook in Austria. In the 265 kilometre mountainous race, Bennett finished in 18th place. He said of the New Zealand team riding for him "The biggest thing was riding with a great bunch of Kiwi guys. This was the big difference to be well supported here. The race was super-hard from the start which surprised us. It meant that Paddy (Bevin), Dion (Smith) and Sam (Bewley) had to work harder much earlier. But they looked after me and it was a really well-run team. That's the big positive for me."

=== 2019 ===
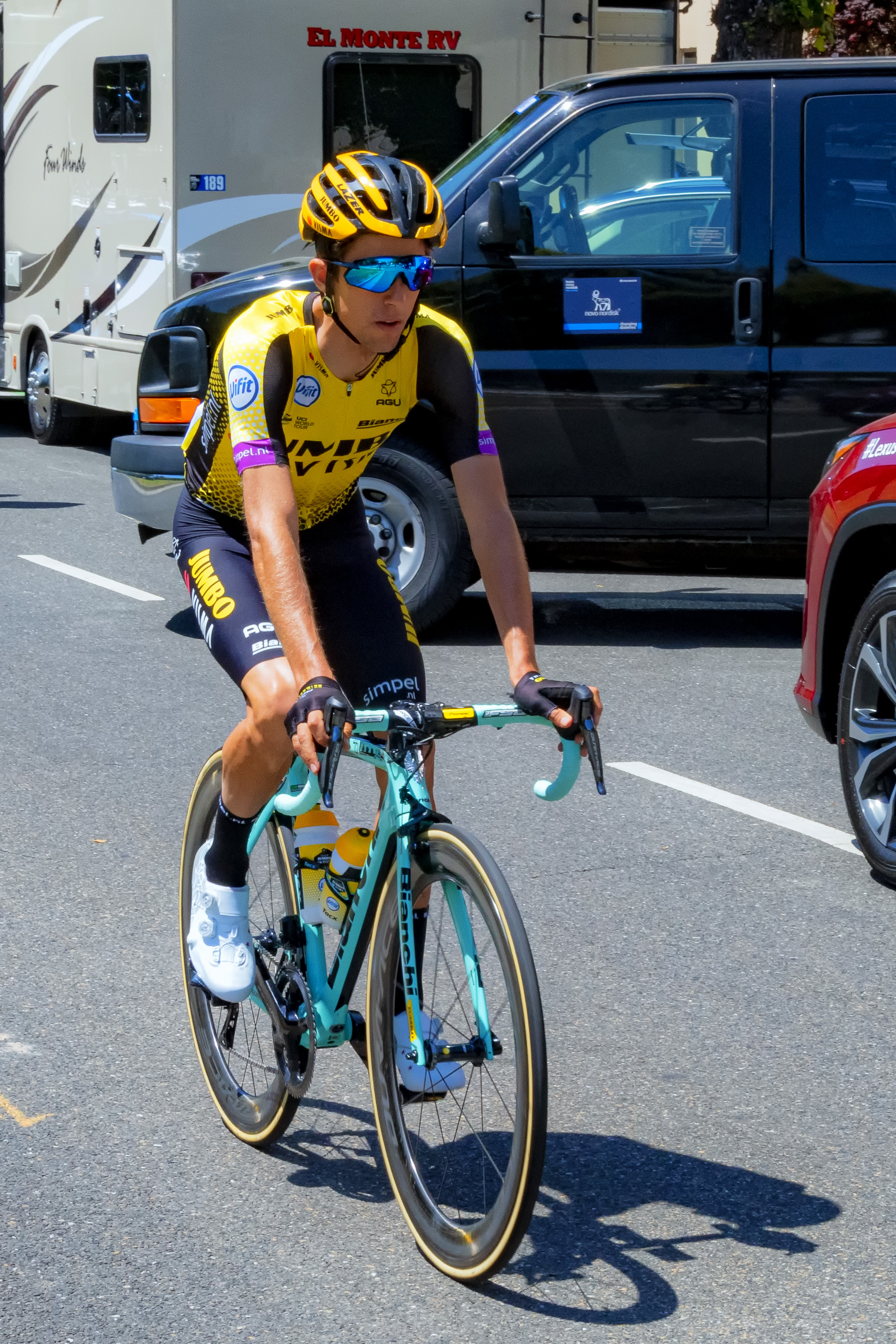
Bennett at the 2019 Tour of California, where he finished fourth overall.

George Bennett competed in the 2019 Tour of California and took third place on stage six which finished at the top of Mt Baldy, five seconds behind Tadej Pogacar and Sergio Andres Higuita. He said "Both of them were ahead of me on GC, and I knew that, so I had to try to drop them, and I tried to drop them fairly early on and paid the price for that. But I had to try." He came in fourth place in the general classification for the seven stage race.

George Bennett raced in support of Steven Kruijswijk at the 2019 Tour de France. Bennett found himself in 5th place after Jumbo Visma won the team time trial in stage two. He increased this by one place in stage 3 and maintained 4th position until stage ten where he lost 9 minutes 41 seconds in the cross winds after riding back to get water bottles from the team car and missing the split. Bennett commented that "It's one of the downsides of being in a really stacked team where they all can win. Then you have a guy like me who would be a GC leader on another team, you are on helping duties."

George Bennett was involved in two crashes in stage 18, the first on a descent when he and Nicholas Roche fell and the second was in the last descent of the stage. Bennett crossed the line in 27th position. He completed the Tour De France in 24th position.

In November 2019, Bennett underwent surgery to remove three ribs due to experiencing chronic slipping rib syndrome.

=== 2020 ===
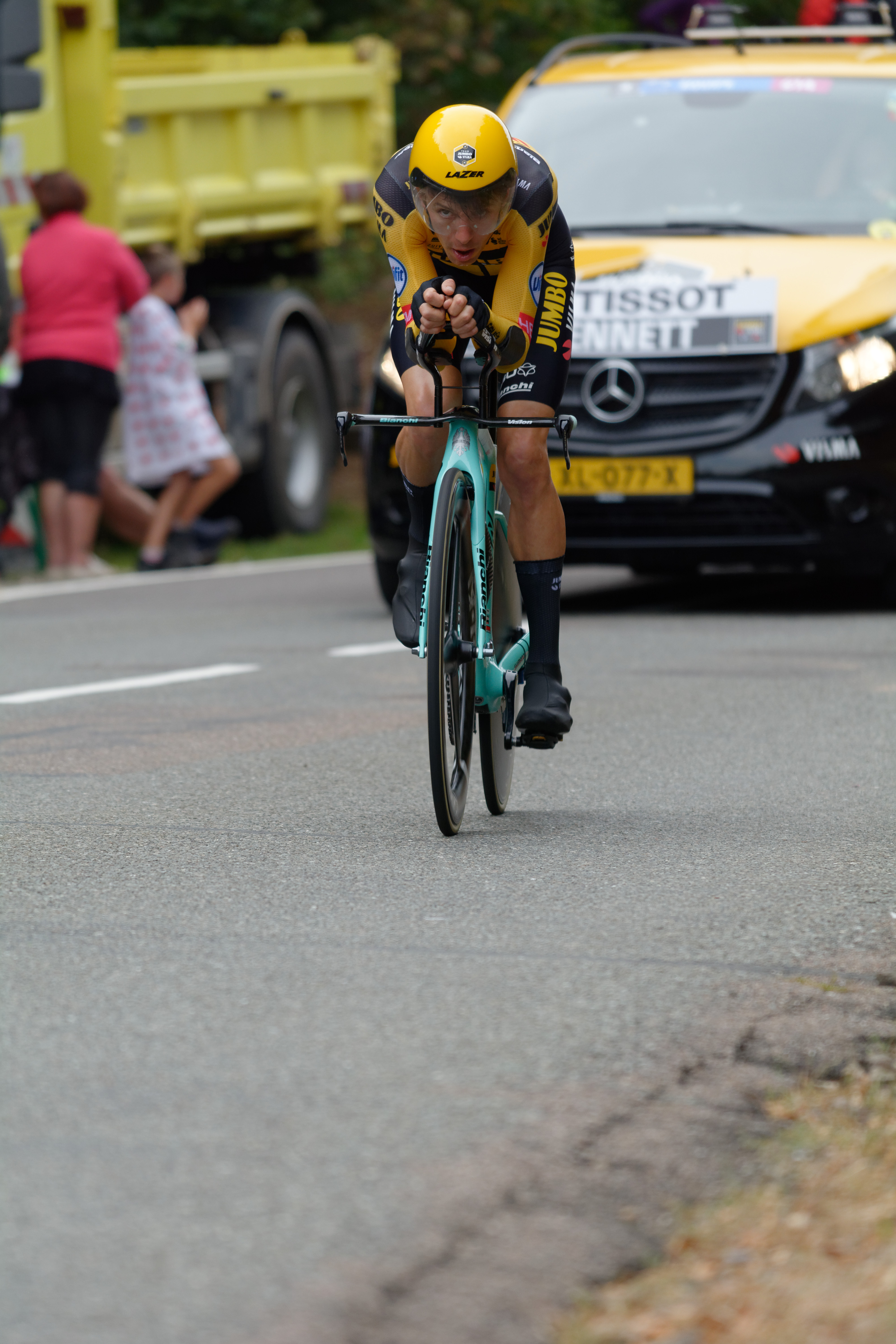
Bennett at the 2020 Tour de France

Bennett started his 2020 season at the Tour Down Under where he placed 8th overall. In February at the National Championships, Bennett finished second in the road race after spending 80 kilometres (50 miles) out in front by himself only for Shane Archbold to catch and sprint past him on the line. When the season resumed after the interruption by the COVID-19 pandemic, he managed to get 5th overall in both the Vuelta a Burgos and the Tour de l'Ain. He participated in the Tour de France, where he wore Māori-themed Shimano S-Phyre shoes painted by his artist girlfriend, Caitlin Fielder.

Bennett's form continued in August at Gran Piemonte where he attained his first ever one-day win. This was the one of only two days in the season where Bennett was able to ride as the team leader. He said of the victory "I’m really happy that I could do it today. I told the boys that I wanted to try and they really did a wonderful job".

Three days later at Il Lombardia, he got the highest ever result by a New Zealander in a Cycling monument by placing second behind Jakob Fuglsang. Bennett attacked on the final climb with 6.5 kilometres to go, but Jakob Fuglsang managed to stay on Bennett's wheel and then counterattacked. Bennett finished 31 seconds behind Fuglsang.

=== 2021 ===
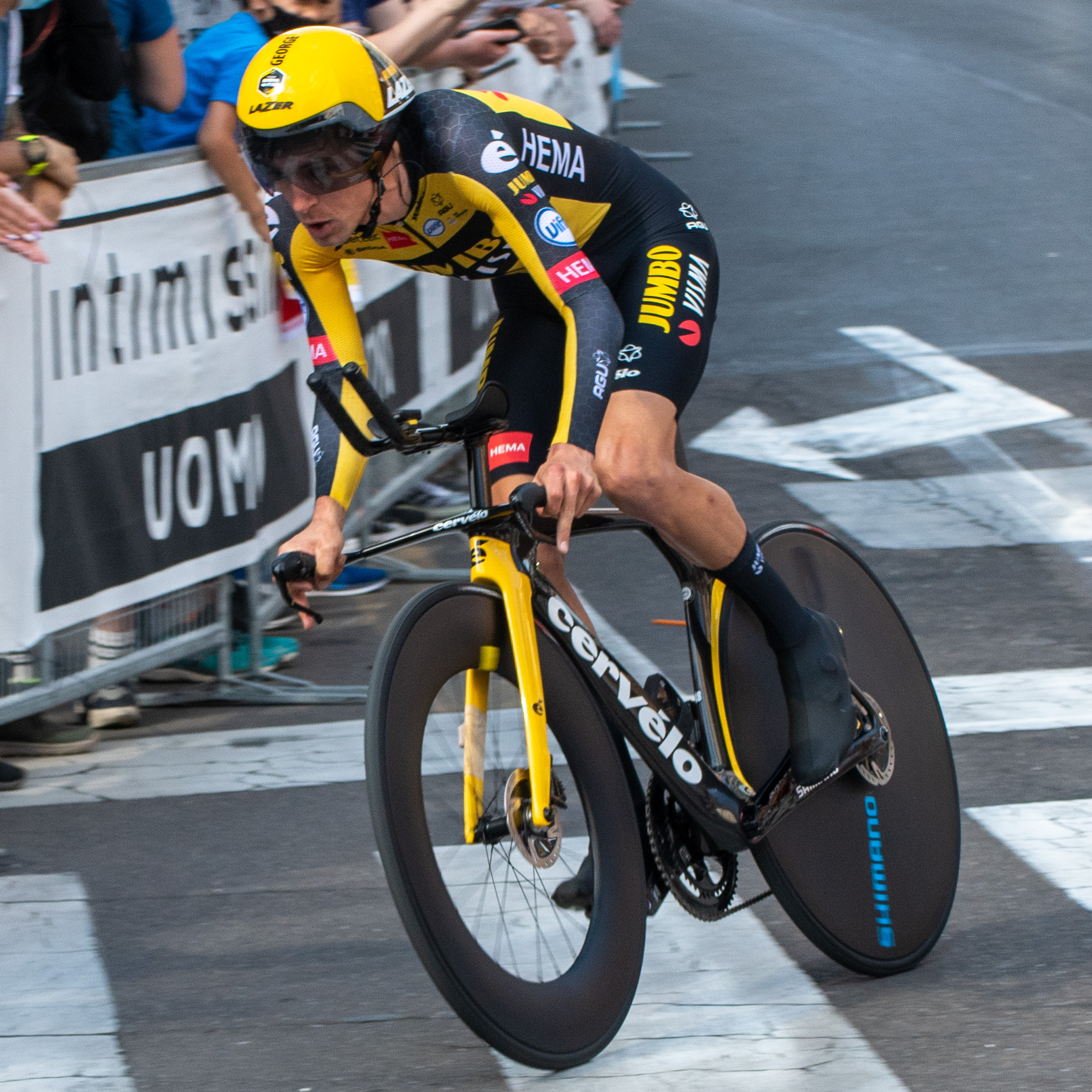
Bennett at the 2021 Giro d'Italia

George Bennett won the New Zealand road race title in February 2021 by almost two minutes. He attacked the group of Mark Stewart, Michael Torckler, Ryan Christensen and Michael Vink, successfully dropping them with 8 kilometres (5.0 mi) to go in the 174-kilometre (108 mi) race. Bennett said of the race "I've been trying for this title for 10 years. I have always wanted to win the jersey and to be able to wear it with my team all year on the World Tour is so special," George Bennett came second in the 44-kilometre (27 mi) km time trial two days earlier, finishing 0.7 seconds behind the winner Aaron Gate.

Bennett was named as the team leader for Jumbo Visma for the 2021 Giro d'Italia. He was aiming for a top 5 finish. However the first week was very disappointing as he struggled in the cold and wet conditions, losing time to his rivals on stage six. He commented that "I would say it's by quite a long way the biggest disappointment, not one of, the biggest disappointment." In the second half of the race, Bennett found better form, with a third place on stage 12 and a 7th place on stage 14 which finished with the climb up Monte Zoncolan. He finished in 10th position on the uphill finish on stage 17. He eventually finished in 11th position in the general classification. Bennett, instead of racing in that year's Tour de France, spent July preparing for the Tokyo Olympics where he was expected to ride in the time trial and the road race. The 234-kilometre (145 mi) men's road race, which featured 4865m of elevation gain, was expected to suit his climbing style. Bennett ended up finishing the road race in twenty-sixth place, 6:20 down on winner Richard Carapaz. He said of the race "I'm sure New Zealand just wasted six and a half hours watching that... I just didn't have it. It's a tough day. It happens".

=== 2022 ===
George Bennett started 2022 racing in the New Zealand Cycle Classic where he came fourth in the general classification. He came third in the stage one team time trial and third in stage four from Masterton to Te Wharau hill. He came seventh in the individual time trial at the New Zealand National Championships and 22nd in the road race. The road race was shortened to 90 kilometres (56 mi) due to howling winds from Cyclone Dovi.

Bennett competed in the UAE Tour coming in 36th place on General Classification after working for Tadej Pogačar, who won. He then came 42nd in the Volta Ciclista a Catalunya, this time working for João Almeida who came third. He did not finish Itzulia Basque Country or Liège–Bastogne–Liège. He said his lack of success in the spring was due to his performance being "derailed by sickness". In early June, he competed in the Critérium du Dauphiné coming in 12th place in stage eight and 20th in the General classification. Of his 12th place in stage eight, Bennett said "I'm happy to leave the race with a bit of confidence, actually, because you start to doubt yourself, of course you do. I had that feeling back - the feeling I need for the Tour."

Bennett started the 2022 Tour de France as lieutenant for Tadej Pogačar. His efforts in the mountains helped Pogačar hold a 40-second advantage over Jonas Vingegaard until Bennett tested positive for COVID-19 and withdrew from the race before Stage 10. Polish teammate Rafał Majka also tested positive but due to him not being contagious he could continue. On Stage 9, Bennett and teammate Marc Soler put in most of the hard work on the Pas de Morgins which dropped Daniel Martínez (INEOS Grenadiers) out of the top 10 overall.

Bennett came second overall at the 36th edition of the Vuelta a Castilla y León. He attacked in the final kilometres of stage 2, finishing behind Simon Yates, who took the stage victory and the overall classification. Bennett also came third in the points classification. He commented that "It felt good to be back on the bike and back at the races after the disappointment I had at the Tour. I actually didn't feel that good today but hung on and had the legs to do something at the end. I'm confident the form is still in the body from all the work I've done and I'm confident we'll see it over the coming weeks."

He finished 13th at the 2022 Clásica de San Sebastián, coming in 4:09 behind the winner, Remco Evenepoel. The next day at the Circuito de Getxo Bennett came home in eighth after helping teammate Juan Ayuso win the race.

The following month at the Tour de l'Ain, during Stage 1, Julian Alaphilippe attacked and Bennett along with Andrea Piccolo were the only ones able to hold his wheel. Bennett led over the final climb with 10 kilometres (6.2 mi) to go. This gave him enough mountain points to lead the classification going into stage 2. Groupama–FDJ brought them back to make a bunch sprint where Bennett finished 26th. In stage 3, Bennett came in third place and placed seventh overall in the general classification.

=== 2023 ===
Bennett crashed in stage two of the Tour de Suisse and withdrew from the event after riding a further two stages. After withdrawing, he described cycling as an “absolute dog of a sport”. He subsequently did not make the UAE Team Emirates roster for the 2023 Tour de France. He placed 7th overall in the Tour of Austria and 6th overall in the Vuelta a Burgos. In September 2023, Bennett signed a two-year contract with Israel-Premier Tech, stating that "I see a lot of opportunities, especially in Grand Tours and in the high mountains". He described his time at UAE Team Emirates as having gone "really fast. I made a lot of really good friends at UAE, and there were some awesome moments, like being part of the Tour with Tadej last year but I was just so shit in terms of results”.

=== 2024 ===
Bennett took third place at the Giro d'Abruzzo and the Sibiu Cycling tour. Bennett rode in the Vuelta a España and climbed up to 10th place coming 9th in stage 10 and 12th in stage 11. However, he was unable to hold that position and had slipped to 34th position by stage 21. He entered the Edition Zero Gravel race in Waimate, New Zealand at the end of the year and won the 240 km race by 4 minutes. He said of the race “My biggest fear was getting a puncture early on and being stuck riding on my own...I was shitting it about riding 250 kilometres on gravel. No matter what, no matter how fit you are or where you’re riding, being on a bike that long is hard.”

=== 2025 ===
2025 was described by Bennett as "the toughest year of my life". His mother died early in the year. He had crashes on stage 1 of the Tour de Pologne and then he crashed twice during the first stage of the Vuelta a Espana which ended his participation. Following that, his Israel Premier Tech team was excluded from races towards the end of the year.

=== 2026 ===
In February 2026, Bennett won the New Zealand road cycling title with a solo attack with 30 km to go. He ended up winning the 188 km race by 41 seconds. He said of the race: "This win means a lot. I have had a really rough 18 months so this means the world. To finally win a race again - with my friends, my family, my team-mates and Bewls all here."

Bennett said of riding professionally: "I'm more motivated than I've been in the past. I think I have a good appreciation for how much of a privilege it is to be a bike racer...I know the years are limited. Maybe I've only got three more years or something, so you start thinking - OK, I need to enjoy these." He went on to say in the interview: "the thought of going to work in an office is the scariest thing in the world".

Bennett raced in his sixth Tour De France and his 17th Grand Tour in July.

== Personal life ==
Bennett is in a relationship with Caitlin Fielder, an artist and pro athlete.

== Major results ==
2009
2nd Overall Tour de Vineyards
9th Overall Tour of Wellington
2010
2nd Overall Tour de Vineyards

1st Stage 3

6th Overall Ronde de l'Isard
9th Overall Tour of Wellington
2011
1st Overall Tour of Wellington
2nd Overall Ronde de l'Isard
3rd Overall Tour de Vineyards
4th Road race, National Under-23 Road Championships
2012
4th Overall Tour de Vineyards
2013
2nd Road race, National Road Championships
8th Overall USA Pro Cycling Challenge
2014
9th Overall Tour of Utah
9th Overall Tour de Vineyards
2015
5th Road race, National Road Championships
10th Overall Tour Down Under
2016
7th Overall Tour of California
10th Overall Vuelta a España
2017 (1 pro win)
1st Overall Tour of California
7th Overall Abu Dhabi Tour
9th Overall Volta a Catalunya
2018
4th Road race, National Road Championships
4th Overall Tour de Pologne
5th Overall Tour of the Alps
6th Overall Volta a Catalunya
8th Overall Giro d'Italia
9th Overall Tirreno–Adriatico
10th Giro di Lombardia
2019
1st Stage 2 (TTT) Tour de France
4th Time trial, National Road Championships
4th Overall Tour of California
6th Overall Paris–Nice
2020 (1)
1st Gran Piemonte
National Road Championships

2nd Road race
2nd Time trial

2nd Giro di Lombardia
5th Overall Vuelta a Burgos
5th Overall Tour de l'Ain
8th Overall Tour Down Under
2021 (1)
National Road Championships

1st Road race
2nd Time trial

8th Gravel and Tar Classic
2022
4th Overall Tour de Langkawi
4th Overall New Zealand Cycle Classic
7th Overall Tour de l'Ain
8th Circuito de Getxo
2023
2nd Time trial, National Road Championships
6th Overall Vuelta a Burgos
7th Overall Tour of Austria
9th Cadel Evans Great Ocean Road Race
9th Coppa Sabatini
2024
3rd Overall Giro d'Abruzzo
3rd Overall Sibiu Cycling Tour
National Road Championships

4th Road race
5th Time trial

7th Mercan'Tour Classic
2025
3rd Road race, National Road Championships
2026 (1)
1st Road race, National Road Championships
8th Overall O Gran Camiño

=== General classification results timeline ===
Grand Tour general classification results
Grand Tour	2012	2013	2014	2015	2016	2017	2018	2019	2020	2021	2022	2023
Giro d'Italia	—	122	—	DNS	—	—	8	—	—	11	—	—
Tour de France	—	—	—	—	53	DNF	—	24	34	—	DNF	—
Vuelta a España	—	—	89	37	10	DNF	35	33	12	—	—	
Major stage race general classification results
Race	2012	2013	2014	2015	2016	2017	2018	2019	2020	2021	2022	2023
Paris–Nice	—	—	26	58	45	—	—	6	—	30	—	—
Tirreno–Adriatico	—	—	—	—	—	—	9	—	—	—	—	44
Volta a Catalunya	—	27	32	DNF	—	9	6	—	NH	DNF	42	60
Tour of the Basque Country	—	—	—	58	DNF	11	—	22	NH	—	DNF	—
Tour de Romandie	37	58	—	—	—	—	—	—	NH	—	—	—
Critérium du Dauphiné	—	53	46	14	—	—	—	—	—	—	20	—
Tour de Suisse	—	—	—	—	—	—	—	—	—	—	—	DNF

==== Monuments results timeline ====
Monument	2012	2013	2014	2015	2016	2017	2018	2019	2020	2021	2022	2023
Milan–San Remo	Has not contested during his career											
Tour of Flanders	Has not contested during his career											
Paris–Roubaix	Has not contested during his career											
Liège–Bastogne–Liège	—	—	—	—	—	—	—	—	—	—	DNF	DNF
Giro di Lombardia	53	DNF	—	35	—	—	10	35	2	85	—	

Legend
—	Did not compete
DNF	Did not finish
IP	In progress
NH	Not held
