= Sutrio =

Sutrio Sudri (Friulian)
- Comune
- Comune di Sutrio
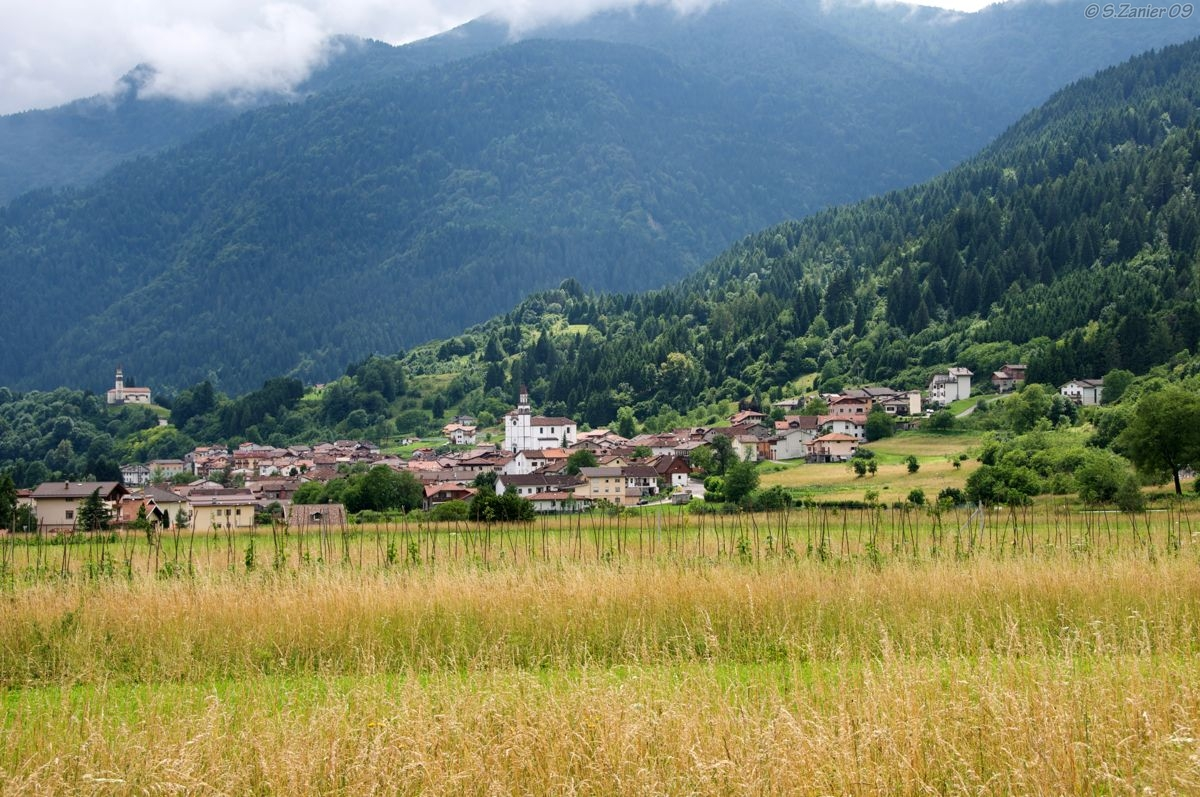
- The town of Sutrio in summer

- Location within Italy Location within Friuli-Venezia Giulia
- Coordinates: 46°31′N 12°52′E
- Country: Italy
- Region: Friuli-Venezia Giulia
- Province: Udine (UD)
- Frazioni: Nojaris, Priola

Area
  - Total: 21.1 km^{2} (8.1 sq mi)
- Elevation: 565 m (1,854 ft)

Population (Dec. 2004)
  - Total: 1,392
  - Density: 66.0/km^{2} (171/sq mi)
- Demonym: Sutriesi
- Time zone: UTC+1 (CET)
  - Summer (DST): UTC+2 (CEST)
- Postal code: 33020
- Dialing code: 0433
- Website: Official website

Sutrio (Friulian: Sudri) is a comune (municipality) in the Regional decentralization entity of Udine in the Italian region of Friuli-Venezia Giulia, located about 120 kilometres (75 mi) northwest of Trieste and about 60 kilometres (37 mi) northwest of Udine. As of 31 December 2004, it had a population of 1,392 and an area of 21.1 square kilometres (8.1 mi^{2}).

The municipality of Sutrio contains the frazioni (boroughs) of Nojaris and Priola.

Sutrio borders the following municipalities: Arta Terme, Cercivento, Lauco, Ovaro, Paluzza, Ravascletto, Zuglio.

== Demographic evolution ==
Historical population

Year	Pop.	±%
1861	?	—
1871	1,279	—
1881	1,396	+9.1%
1901	1,578	+13.0%
1911	1,703	+7.9%

Year	Pop.	±%
1921	1,794	+5.3%
1931	1,707	−4.8%
1936	1,574	−7.8%
1951	1,758	+11.7%
1961	1,751	−0.4%

Year	Pop.	±%
1971	1,575	−10.1%
1981	1,510	−4.1%
1991	1,428	−5.4%
2001	1,392	−2.5%

Source: Data from ISTAT
