= 2018 Giro d'Italia =

2018 UCI World Tour, race 21 of 38
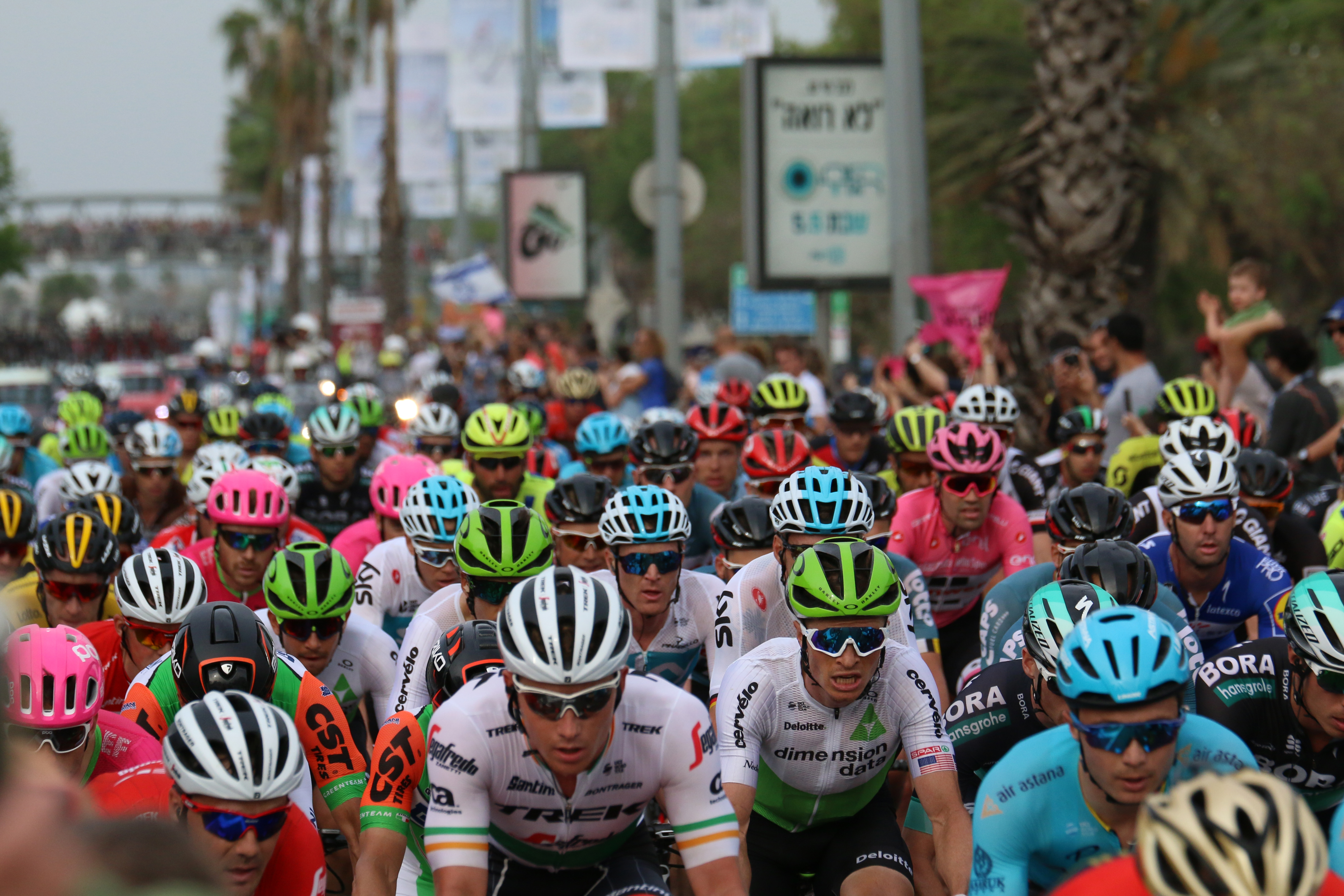
- The peloton on Stage 2 in Tel Aviv

Race details
- Dates: 4–27 May 2018
- Stages: 21
- Distance: 3,572.4 km (2,219.8 mi)
- Winning time: 89hr 02' 39"

Results
Jersey awarded to the overall winner	Winner	Chris Froome (GBR)	(Team Sky)
	Second	Tom Dumoulin (NED)	(Team Sunweb)
	Third	Miguel Ángel López (COL)	(Astana)
Jersey awarded to the points classification winner	Points	Elia Viviani (ITA)	(Quick-Step Floors)
Jersey awarded to the mountains classification winner	Mountains	Chris Froome (GBR)	(Team Sky)
Jersey awarded to the young rider classification winner	Young rider	Miguel Ángel López (COL)	(Astana)
	Team	(United Kingdom) Team Sky	

The 2018 Giro d'Italia was the 101st edition of the Giro d'Italia, one of cycling's Grand Tour races. The race started in Jerusalem on 4 May, with a 9.7 km (6 mi) individual time trial followed by two additional stages within Israel. After a rest day, there were 18 further stages in Italy before the tour reached the finish in Rome on 27 May.

The race was won by Team Sky's Chris Froome, the first British rider to win the race. In winning, Froome completed a hat-trick of consecutive Grand Tour victories, becoming the first rider since Bernard Hinault to hold all three Grand Tour titles simultaneously. His victory was highlighted by an audacious 80 km solo breakaway to win the mountainous stage 19; attacking the small group of leaders including reigning champion Tom Dumoulin on the Cima Coppi of the 2018 Giro, the graveled climb of the Colle delle Finestre, he continued to extend his lead over the Sestriere and to the summit finish of Bardonecchia and overturned a more than three minute deficit to take both the pink jersey, the Cima Coppi prize and the mountains classification. The solo win, and the simultaneous implosion of long-time race leader Simon Yates, who lost more than 30 minutes on the day having lost contact on the first climb of the day, was described as "one of the most extraordinary days in Giro d'Italia history".

== History ==
The Giro Big Start, touted as one of the most expensive sporting events in Israel's history, was largely financed by Canadian-Israeli mogul Sylvan Adams with the help of Israel's Tourism and Transportation Ministries. The 21-stage race began with a 10-kilometer time trial in Jerusalem, followed by a 167-kilometer race from Haifa to Tel Aviv, and a 229-kilometer race from Beersheba to Eilat. They were the first stages of any Grand Tour event ever that have been held outside Europe.

The 2018 Giro d'Italia Israel start was held to pay tribute to Italian cyclist Gino Bartali, a three-time winner of the Giro d'Italia. Bartali helped rescue hundreds of Italian Jews during the Holocaust and was recognized by Yad Vashem in 2013 as Righteous Among the Nations.

The race was won by Team Sky's Chris Froome, who therefore held all three Grand Tour titles simultaneously and became the first British cyclist to win the overall classification in the Giro. Froome crashed during a recon ride ahead of the prologue and lost time consistently over the first two weeks. In the final week, however, he won a stage that ended with the climb of Monte Zoncolan, then took back several minutes on all his rivals in Stage 19 with a ride described as "one for the history books". He ended up defeating the defending champion, Tom Dumoulin, by 46 seconds.

== Teams ==
All 18 UCI WorldTeams were automatically invited and were obliged to attend the race. Four wildcard UCI Professional Continental teams were also selected. Each team started with eight riders (one less than in the previous year).

Lotto–Soudal chose to compete under a different name from the rest of the season: they became Lotto Fix ALL, using the name of a product made by Soudal, their normal sponsor.

The teams entering the race were:

UCI WorldTeams

- AG2R La Mondiale
- Astana
- Bahrain–Merida
- BMC Racing Team
- Bora–Hansgrohe
- EF Education First–Drapac p/b Cannondale
- Team Dimension Data
- Groupama–FDJ
- Team Katusha–Alpecin
- LottoNL–Jumbo
- Lotto Fix ALL
- Movistar Team
- Mitchelton–Scott
- Quick-Step Floors
- Team Sky
- Team Sunweb
- Trek–Segafredo
- UAE Team Emirates

UCI Professional Continental teams

- Bardiani–CSF
- Androni Giocattoli–Sidermec
- Israel Cycling Academy
- Wilier Triestina–Selle Italia

== Pre-race favorites ==
The main pre-race favorites were reigning Tour de France and Vuelta a España champion Chris Froome (Team Sky), defending champion Tom Dumoulin (Team Sunweb) and Fabio Aru (UAE Team Emirates). Other general classification contenders were Miguel Ángel López (Astana), Thibaut Pinot (Groupama–FDJ), Wout Poels (Team Sky), Simon Yates and Esteban Chaves (both Mitchelton–Scott), George Bennett (LottoNL–Jumbo), Louis Meintjes (Team Dimension Data), Michael Woods (EF Education First–Drapac p/b Cannondale), Davide Formolo (Bora–Hansgrohe), Rohan Dennis (BMC Racing Team) and Domenico Pozzovivo (Bahrain–Merida).

Sprinters at the Giro included Elia Viviani, Jakub Mareczko, Niccolo Bonifazio, Danny van Poppel, Sacha Modolo, Sam Bennett, Jens Debusschere and Ryan Gibbons.

== Route and stages ==
List of stages
Stage	Date	Course	Distance	Type	Winner
1	4 May	Jerusalem to Jerusalem	9.7 km (6 mi)	Individual time trial	Tom Dumoulin (NED)
2	5 May	Haifa (Israel) to Tel Aviv (Israel)	167 km (104 mi)	Flat stage	Elia Viviani (ITA)
3	6 May	Beersheba (Israel) to Eilat (Israel)	229 km (142 mi)	Flat stage	Elia Viviani (ITA)
	7 May	Rest day			
4	8 May	Catania to Caltagirone	202 km (126 mi)	Hilly stage	Tim Wellens (BEL)
5	9 May	Agrigento to Santa Ninfa (Valle del Belice)	153 km (95 mi)	Hilly stage	Enrico Battaglin (ITA)
6	10 May	Caltanissetta to Mount Etna	169 km (105 mi)	Mountain stage	Esteban Chaves (COL)
7	11 May	Pizzo to Praia a Mare	159 km (99 mi)	Flat stage	Sam Bennett (IRL)
8	12 May	Praia a Mare to Montevergine	209 km (130 mi)	Mid-mountain stage	Richard Carapaz (ECU)
9	13 May	Pesco Sannita to Gran Sasso (Campo Imperatore)	225 km (140 mi)	Mid-mountain stage	Simon Yates (GBR)
	14 May	Rest day			
10	15 May	Penne to Gualdo Tadino	244 km (152 mi)	Hilly stage	Matej Mohorič (SLO)
11	16 May	Assisi to Osimo	156 km (97 mi)	Hilly stage	Simon Yates (GBR)
12	17 May	Osimo to Imola	214 km (133 mi)	Flat stage	Sam Bennett (IRL)
13	18 May	Ferrara to Nervesa della Battaglia	180 km (112 mi)	Flat stage	Elia Viviani (ITA)
14	19 May	San Vito al Tagliamento to Monte Zoncolan	186 km (116 mi)	Mountain stage	Chris Froome (GBR)
15	20 May	Tolmezzo to Sappada	176 km (109 mi)	Mid-mountain stage	Simon Yates (GBR)
	21 May	Rest day			
16	22 May	Trento to Rovereto	34.2 km (21 mi)	Individual time trial	Rohan Dennis (AUS)
17	23 May	Riva del Garda to Iseo	149.5 km (93 mi)	Flat stage	Elia Viviani (ITA)
18	24 May	Abbiategrasso to Prato Nevoso	196 km (122 mi)	Mountain stage	Maximilian Schachmann (GER)
19	25 May	Venaria Reale to Bardonecchia (Monte Jafferau)	185 km (115 mi)	Mountain stage	Chris Froome (GBR)
20	26 May	Susa to Cervinia	214 km (133 mi)	Mountain stage	Mikel Nieve (ESP)
21	27 May	Rome to Rome	115 km (71 mi)	Flat stage	Sam Bennett (IRL)

== Classification leadership ==
In the Giro d'Italia, four different jerseys are awarded. The first and most important is the general classification, calculated by adding each rider's finishing times on each stage. Riders receive time bonuses (10, 6 and 4 seconds respectively) for finishing in the first three places on each stage. Smaller time bonuses are also given to the top three riders at the last intermediate sprint on each stage (3, 2 and 1 seconds respectively). The rider with the lowest cumulative time is awarded the pink jersey (Italian: maglia rosa), and is considered the winner of the Giro d'Italia.

Points for the points classification
Position		1	2	3	4	5	6	7	8	9	10	11	12	13	14	15
Flat stages	Finish	50	35	25	18	14	12	10	8	7	6	5	4	3	2	1
Flat stages	Intermediate Sprint	20	12	8	6	4	3	2	1	0						
Hilly stages	Finish	25	18	12	8	6	5	4	3	2	1	0				
Hilly stages	Intermediate Sprint	10	6	3	2	1	0									
Other stages	Finish	15	12	9	7	6	5	4	3	2	1	0				
Other stages	Intermediate Sprint	8	4	1	0											

Additionally, there is a points classification. Riders win points for finishing in the top placings on each stage or by being within the first cyclists to reach intermediate sprint locations along each mass-start stage. Flat stages award more points than mountainous stages, meaning that this classification tends to favour sprinters. The leader of the points classification wore the cyclamen jersey.

Points for the mountains classification
Position	1	2	3	4	5	6	7	8	9
Points for Cima Coppi	45	30	20	14	10	6	4	2	1
Points for Category 1	35	18	12	9	6	4	2	1	0
Points for Category 2	15	8	6	4	2	1	0		
Points for Category 3	7	4	2	1	0				
Points for Category 4	3	2	1	0					

There is also a mountains classification, for which points were awarded for reaching the top of a climb before other riders. Each climb was categorised as either first, second, third or fourth-category, with more points available for the more difficult, higher-categorised climbs. For first-category climbs, the top eight riders earned points; on second-category climbs, six riders won points; on third-category climbs, only the top four riders earned points with three on fourth-category climbs. The leadership of the mountains classification was marked by a blue jersey. The Cima Coppi, the race's highest point of elevation, awards more points than the other first-category climbs, with nine riders scoring points. At 2,178 metres (7,146 ft), the Cima Coppi for the 2018 Giro d'Italia is the Colle delle Finestre.

The fourth jersey represents the young rider classification. This is decided the same way as the general classification, but only riders born after 1 January 1994 are eligible. The winner of the classification is awarded a white jersey. There are also two classifications for teams. In the Trofeo Fast Team classification, the times of the best three cyclists per team on each stage are added up; the leading team is one with the lowest total time. The Trofeo Super Team is a team points classification, with the top 20 riders of each stage earning points for their team.

The first additional award is the intermediate sprint classification. Each road stage has two sprints – the Traguardi Volanti. The first 5 riders across the intermediate sprint lines are awarded points (10, 6, 3, 2 and 1 points respectively); the rider with the most points at the end of the race wins the classification. Another classification – the combativity prize (Italian: Premio Combattività) – involves points awarded to the first riders at the stage finishes, at intermediate sprints, and at the summits of categorised climbs. There is also a breakaway award (Italian: Premio della Fuga). For this, points are awarded to each rider in any breakaway smaller than 10 riders that escapes for at least 5 kilometres (3.1 mi). Each rider is awarded a point for each kilometre that the rider was away from the peloton. The rider with the most points at the end of the Giro wins the award. The final classification is a "fair play" ranking for each team. Teams are given penalty points for infringing various rules. These range from half-point penalties, for offences that merit warnings from race officials, to a 2000-point penalty, for a positive doping test. The team that has the lowest points total at the end of the Giro wins the classification.

Classification leadership by stage
Stage	Winner	General classification	Points classification	Mountains classification	Young rider classification	General Super Team
1	Tom Dumoulin	Tom Dumoulin	Tom Dumoulin (Note: In stage 2, Rohan Dennis, who was second in the points classification, wore the cyclamen jersey, because Tom Dumoulin (in first place) wore the pink jersey as leader of the general classification during that stage.)	not awarded	Maximilian Schachmann	Team Katusha–Alpecin
2	Elia Viviani	Rohan Dennis	Elia Viviani	Enrico Barbin	Maximilian Schachmann	Team Katusha–Alpecin
3	Elia Viviani	Rohan Dennis	Elia Viviani	Enrico Barbin	Maximilian Schachmann	Team Katusha–Alpecin
4	Tim Wellens	Rohan Dennis	Elia Viviani	Enrico Barbin	Maximilian Schachmann	Mitchelton–Scott
5	Enrico Battaglin	Rohan Dennis	Elia Viviani	Enrico Barbin	Maximilian Schachmann	Mitchelton–Scott
6	Esteban Chaves	Simon Yates	Elia Viviani	Esteban Chaves	Richard Carapaz	Mitchelton–Scott
7	Sam Bennett	Simon Yates	Elia Viviani	Esteban Chaves	Richard Carapaz	Mitchelton–Scott
8	Richard Carapaz	Simon Yates	Elia Viviani	Esteban Chaves	Richard Carapaz	Mitchelton–Scott
9	Simon Yates	Simon Yates	Elia Viviani	Simon Yates (Note: From stage 10 to 15, Esteban Chaves, who was second in the mountains classifications, wore the blue jersey, because Simon Yates (in first place) wore the pink jersey as leader of the general classification during these stages. Giulio Ciccone wore the blue jersey from stage 16 to 18 for the same reason.)	Richard Carapaz	Mitchelton–Scott
10	Matej Mohorič	Simon Yates	Elia Viviani	Simon Yates	Richard Carapaz	Mitchelton–Scott
11	Simon Yates	Simon Yates	Elia Viviani	Simon Yates	Richard Carapaz	Mitchelton–Scott
12	Sam Bennett	Simon Yates	Elia Viviani	Simon Yates	Richard Carapaz	Mitchelton–Scott
13	Elia Viviani	Simon Yates	Elia Viviani	Simon Yates	Richard Carapaz	Mitchelton–Scott
14	Chris Froome	Simon Yates	Elia Viviani	Simon Yates	Miguel Ángel López	Team Sky
15	Simon Yates	Simon Yates	Elia Viviani	Simon Yates	Miguel Ángel López	Team Sky
16	Rohan Dennis	Simon Yates	Elia Viviani	Simon Yates	Miguel Ángel López	Team Sky
17	Elia Viviani	Simon Yates	Elia Viviani	Simon Yates	Miguel Ángel López	Team Sky
18	Maximilian Schachmann	Simon Yates	Elia Viviani	Simon Yates	Miguel Ángel López	Team Sky
19	Chris Froome	Chris Froome	Elia Viviani	Chris Froome (Note: In stage 20, Simon Yates, who was second in the mountains classification, wore the blue jersey, because Chris Froome (in first place) wore the pink jersey as leader of the general classification during that stage. Giulio Ciccone wore the blue jersey during stage 21 for the same reason.)	Miguel Ángel López	Team Sky
20	Mikel Nieve	Chris Froome	Elia Viviani	Chris Froome	Miguel Ángel López	Team Sky
21	Sam Bennett	Chris Froome	Elia Viviani	Chris Froome	Miguel Ángel López	Team Sky
Final		Chris Froome	Elia Viviani	Chris Froome	Miguel Ángel López	Team Sky

== Final standings ==
Legend
General classification	Denotes the leader of the general classification	Mountains classification	Denotes the leader of the mountains classification
Points classification	Denotes the leader of the points classification	Young rider classification	Denotes the leader of the young rider classification

=== General classification ===
General classification (1–10)
Rank	Rider	Team	Time
1	Chris Froome (GBR)	Team Sky	89h 02' 39"
2	Tom Dumoulin (NED)	Team Sunweb	+ 46"
3	Miguel Ángel López (COL)	Astana	+ 4' 57"
4	Richard Carapaz (ECU)	Movistar Team	+ 5' 44"
5	Domenico Pozzovivo (ITA)	Bahrain–Merida	+ 8' 03"
6	Pello Bilbao (ESP)	Astana	+ 11' 50"
7	Patrick Konrad (AUT)	Bora–Hansgrohe	+ 13' 01"
8	George Bennett (NZL)	LottoNL–Jumbo	+ 13' 17"
9	Sam Oomen (NED)	Team Sunweb	+ 14' 18"
10	Davide Formolo (ITA)	Bora–Hansgrohe	+ 15' 16"

=== Points classification ===
Points classification (1–10)
Rank	Rider	Team	Points
1	Elia Viviani (ITA)	Quick-Step Floors	341
2	Sam Bennett (IRL)	Bora–Hansgrohe	282
3	Davide Ballerini (ITA)	Androni Giocattoli–Sidermec	147
4	Sacha Modolo (ITA)	EF Education First–Drapac	122
5	Simon Yates (GBR)	Mitchelton–Scott	113
6	Marco Frapporti (ITA)	Androni Giocattoli–Sidermec	111
7	Danny van Poppel (NED)	LottoNL–Jumbo	107
8	Niccolò Bonifazio (ITA)	Bahrain–Merida	93
9	Eugert Zhupa (ALB)	Wilier Triestina–Selle Italia	84
10	Tom Dumoulin (NED)	Team Sunweb	73

=== Mountains classification ===
Mountains classification (1–10)
Rank	Rider	Team	Points
1	Chris Froome (GBR)	Team Sky	125
2	Giulio Ciccone (ITA)	Bardiani–CSF	108
3	Simon Yates (GBR)	Mitchelton–Scott	91
4	Mikel Nieve (ESP)	Mitchelton–Scott	79
5	Thibaut Pinot (FRA)	Groupama–FDJ	70
6	Richard Carapaz (ECU)	Movistar Team	65
7	Tom Dumoulin (NED)	Team Sunweb	49
8	Esteban Chaves (COL)	Mitchelton–Scott	47
9	Valerio Conti (ITA)	UAE Team Emirates	42
10	Domenico Pozzovivo (ITA)	Bahrain–Merida	40

=== Young rider classification ===
Young rider classification (1–10)
Rank	Rider	Team	Time
1	Miguel Ángel López (COL)	Astana	89h 07' 36"
2	Richard Carapaz (ECU)	Movistar Team	+ 47"
3	Sam Oomen (NED)	Team Sunweb	+ 9' 21"
4	Valerio Conti (ITA)	UAE Team Emirates	+ 1h 18' 07"
5	Fausto Masnada (ITA)	Androni Giocattoli–Sidermec	+ 1h 21' 16"
6	Felix Großschartner (AUT)	Bora–Hansgrohe	+ 1h 23' 50"
7	Matej Mohorič (SLO)	Bahrain–Merida	+ 1h 35' 21"
8	Maximilian Schachmann (GER)	Quick-Step Floors	+ 1h 36' 39"
9	Jack Haig (AUS)	Mitchelton–Scott	+ 1h 58' 09"
10	Giulio Ciccone (ITA)	Bardiani–CSF	+ 2h 03' 58"

=== General Super Team ===
General Super Team classification (1–10)
Rank	Team	Time
1	(United Kingdom) Team Sky	267h 48' 47"
2	(Kazakhstan) Astana	+ 24' 58"
3	(Germany) Bora–Hansgrohe	+ 43' 32"
4	(Germany) Team Sunweb	+ 1h 14' 35"
5	(France) AG2R La Mondiale	+ 1h 30' 32"
6	(Spain) Movistar Team	+ 1h 39' 45"
7	(Netherlands) LottoNL–Jumbo	+ 1h 47' 01"
8	(Australia) Mitchelton–Scott	+ 2h 31' 52"
9	(United Arab Emirates) UAE Team Emirates	+ 2h 33' 27"
10	(France) Groupama–FDJ	+ 2h 34' 04"

== See also ==
- Cycling in Israel
