= List of teams and cyclists in the 2017 Giro d'Italia =

List of cyclists

The 2017 Giro d'Italia was the first of cycling's Grand Tours to take place in the 2017 road cycling season. It was the 100th edition of the Giro d'Italia and took place over 21 stages, beginning in Alghero in Sardinia on 5 May and finishing in Milan on 28 May. The first three stages took place in the island of Sardinia, the next two in the island of Sicilia, with the rest of the race ensuing in continental Italy. The race was won by Tom Dumoulin, who became the first Dutch winner of the Giro.

The following teams and cyclists took part in the 2017 Giro d'Italia.

== Teams ==
All 18 UCI WorldTeams were automatically invited and were obliged to attend the race. Four wildcard UCI Professional Continental teams were also selected. Each team was scheduled to start with nine riders apart from Astana, who started with eight riders, due to the death of Michele Scarponi. Prior to the start of the race, two riders from Bardiani–CSF, Stefano Pirazzi and Nicola Ruffoni, failed drug tests and were excluded from the Giro.

UCI WorldTeams

- AG2R La Mondiale
- Astana
- Bahrain–Merida
- BMC Racing Team
- Bora–Hansgrohe
- Cannondale–Drapac
- Team Dimension Data
- FDJ
- Team Katusha–Alpecin
- LottoNL–Jumbo
- Lotto–Soudal
- Movistar Team
- Orica–Scott
- Quick-Step Floors
- Team Sky
- Team Sunweb
- Trek–Segafredo
- UAE Team Emirates

UCI Professional Continental teams

- Bardiani–CSF
- CCC–Sprandi–Polkowice
- Gazprom–RusVelo
- Wilier Triestina–Selle Italia

== Cyclists ==
Legend
No.	Starting number worn by the rider during the Giro
Pos.	Position in the general classification
Time	Deficit to the winner of the general classification
†	Denotes riders born on or after 1 January 1992 eligible for the young rider classification
General classification	Denotes the winner of the general classification
Points classification	Denotes the winner of the points classification
Mountains classification	Denotes the winner of the mountains classification
Young rider classification	Denotes the winner of the young rider classification (eligibility indicated by †)
HD	Denotes a rider who failed to finish within the time limit, followed by the stage in which this occurred
DNS	Denotes a rider who did not start, followed by the stage before which he withdrew
DNF	Denotes a rider who did not finish, followed by the stage in which he withdrew
DSQ	Denotes a rider who did was disqualified, followed by the stage in which this occurred
Ages correct as of 5 May 2017, the date on which the Giro began

=== By starting number ===
No.	Name	Nationality	Team	Age	Pos.	Time	Ref.
1	Vincenzo Nibali	Italy	Bahrain–Merida	32	3	+ 40"	
2	Valerio Agnoli	Italy	Bahrain–Merida	32	110	+ 4h 13' 59"	
3	Manuele Boaro	Italy	Bahrain–Merida	30	74	+ 3h 13' 22"	
4	Enrico Gasparotto	Italy	Bahrain–Merida	34	76	+ 3h 16' 27"	
5	Javier Moreno	Spain	Bahrain–Merida	32	DSQ-4	–	
6	Franco Pellizotti	Italy	Bahrain–Merida	39	21	+ 59' 43"	
7	Luka Pibernik †	Slovenia	Bahrain–Merida	23	100	+ 3h 58' 19"	
8	Kanstantsin Sivtsov	Belarus	Bahrain–Merida	34	35	+ 1h 52' 02"	
9	Giovanni Visconti	Italy	Bahrain–Merida	34	DNF-20	–	
11	Domenico Pozzovivo	Italy	AG2R La Mondiale	34	6	+ 3' 11"	
12	Julien Bérard	France	AG2R La Mondiale	29	131	+ 4h 31' 11"	
13	François Bidard †	France	AG2R La Mondiale	25	39	+ 2h 09' 03"	
14	Clément Chevrier †	France	AG2R La Mondiale	24	81	+ 3h 27' 08"	
15	Hubert Dupont	France	AG2R La Mondiale	36	19	+ 38' 45"	
16	Ben Gastauer	Luxembourg	AG2R La Mondiale	29	29	+ 1h 35' 49"	
17	Alexandre Geniez	France	AG2R La Mondiale	29	DNF-4	–	
18	Quentin Jaurégui †	France	AG2R La Mondiale	23	90	+ 3h 41' 19"	
19	Matteo Montaguti	Italy	AG2R La Mondiale	33	51	+ 2h 25' 28"	
22	Dario Cataldo	Italy	Astana	32	14	+ 24' 40"	
23	Pello Bilbao	Spain	Astana	27	66	+ 3h 01' 22"	
24	Zhandos Bizhigitov	Kazakhstan	Astana	25	160	+ 5h 26' 28"	
25	Jesper Hansen	Denmark	Astana	26	32	+ 1h 36' 32"	
26	Tanel Kangert	Estonia	Astana	30	DNF-15	–	
27	Luis León Sánchez	Spain	Astana	33	43	+ 2h 16' 12"	
28	Paolo Tiralongo	Italy	Astana	39	83	+ 3h 28' 53"	
29	Andrey Zeits	Kazakhstan	Astana	30	63	+ 2h 56' 15"	
32	Vincenzo Albanese †	Italy	Bardiani–CSF	20	DNS-16	–	
33	Simone Andreetta †	Italy	Bardiani–CSF	23	156	+ 5h 14' 16"	
34	Enrico Barbin	Italy	Bardiani–CSF	27	124	+ 4h 25' 05"	
35	Nicola Boem	Italy	Bardiani–CSF	27	152	+ 5h 05' 32"	
36	Giulio Ciccone †	Italy	Bardiani–CSF	22	95	+ 3h 49' 24"	
37	Mirco Maestri	Italy	Bardiani–CSF	25	143	+ 4h 44' 35"	
38	Lorenzo Rota †	Italy	Bardiani–CSF	21	151	+ 5h 04' 57"	
41	Tejay van Garderen	United States	BMC Racing Team	28	20	+ 57' 13"	
42	Rohan Dennis	Australia	BMC Racing Team	26	DNF-4	–	
43	Silvan Dillier	Switzerland	BMC Racing Team	26	67	+ 3h 02' 38"	
44	Ben Hermans	Belgium	BMC Racing Team	30	DNF-16	–	
45	Manuel Quinziato	Italy	BMC Racing Team	37	133	+ 4h 32' 10"	
46	Joey Rosskopf	United States	BMC Racing Team	27	70	+ 3h 07' 54"	
47	Manuel Senni †	Italy	BMC Racing Team	25	79	+ 3h 23' 35"	
48	Dylan Teuns †	Belgium	BMC Racing Team	25	75	+ 3h 15' 44"	
49	Francisco Ventoso	Spain	BMC Racing Team	34	94	+ 3h 46' 55"	
51	Jan Bárta	Czech Republic	Bora–Hansgrohe	32	127	+ 4h 27' 24"	
52	Cesare Benedetti	Italy	Bora–Hansgrohe	29	115	+ 4h 17' 22"	
53	Sam Bennett	Ireland	Bora–Hansgrohe	26	158	+ 5h 18' 56"	
54	Patrick Konrad	Austria	Bora–Hansgrohe	25	16	+ 35' 50"	
55	José Mendes	Portugal	Bora–Hansgrohe	32	48	+ 2h 23' 54"	
56	Gregor Mühlberger †	Austria	Bora–Hansgrohe	23	41	+ 2h 12' 34"	
57	Matteo Pelucchi	Italy	Bora–Hansgrohe	28	HD-10	–	
58	Lukas Pöstlberger †	Austria	Bora–Hansgrohe	25	114	+ 4h 17' 05"	
59	Rüdiger Selig	Germany	Bora–Hansgrohe	28	DNF-15	–	
61	Pierre Rolland	France	Cannondale–Drapac	30	22	+ 1h 12' 55"	
62	Hugh Carthy †	Great Britain	Cannondale–Drapac	22	92	+ 3h 46' 09"	
63	Joe Dombrowski	United States	Cannondale–Drapac	25	69	+ 3h 07' 39"	
64	Davide Formolo †	Italy	Cannondale–Drapac	24	10	+ 15' 17"	
65	Alex Howes	United States	Cannondale–Drapac	29	136	+ 4h 36' 21"	
66	Kristijan Koren	Slovenia	Cannondale–Drapac	30	128	+ 4h 29' 57"	
67	Tom-Jelte Slagter	Netherlands	Cannondale–Drapac	27	77	+ 3h 17' 51"	
68	Davide Villella	Italy	Cannondale–Drapac	25	72	+ 3h 10' 39"	
69	Michael Woods	Canada	Cannondale–Drapac	30	38	+ 2h 02' 20"	
71	Jan Hirt	Czech Republic	CCC–Sprandi–Polkowice	26	12	+ 20' 49"	
72	Marcin Białobłocki	Poland	CCC–Sprandi–Polkowice	33	159	+ 5h 26' 00"	
73	Felix Großschartner †	Austria	CCC–Sprandi–Polkowice	23	78	+ 3h 19' 04"	
74	Łukasz Owsian	Poland	CCC–Sprandi–Polkowice	27	88	+ 3h 37' 32"	
75	Maciej Paterski	Poland	CCC–Sprandi–Polkowice	30	137	+ 4h 36' 56"	
76	Simone Ponzi	Italy	CCC–Sprandi–Polkowice	30	126	+ 4h 26' 46"	
77	Branislau Samoilau	Belarus	CCC–Sprandi–Polkowice	31	112	+ 4h 15' 18"	
78	Michal Schlegel †	Czech Republic	CCC–Sprandi–Polkowice	21	45	+ 2h 18' 19"	
79	Jan Tratnik	Slovenia	CCC–Sprandi–Polkowice	27	106	+ 4h 11' 13"	
81	Thibaut Pinot	France	FDJ	26	4	+ 1' 17"	
82	William Bonnet	France	FDJ	34	DNS-16	–	
83	Matthieu Ladagnous	France	FDJ	32	97	+ 3h 54' 19"	
84	Tobias Ludvigsson	Sweden	FDJ	26	85	+ 3h 30' 09"	
85	Rudy Molard	France	FDJ	27	44	+ 2h 17' 12"	
86	Steve Morabito	Switzerland	FDJ	34	53	+ 2h 28' 42"	
87	Sébastien Reichenbach	Switzerland	FDJ	27	15	+ 28' 11"	
88	Jérémy Roy	France	FDJ	33	73	+ 3h 12' 11"	
89	Benoît Vaugrenard	France	FDJ	35	103	+ 4h 10' 25"	
91	Sergey Firsanov	Russia	Gazprom–RusVelo	34	96	+ 3h 52' 44"	
92	Pavel Brutt	Russia	Gazprom–RusVelo	35	134	+ 4h 33' 02"	
93	Alexander Foliforov †	Russia	Gazprom–RusVelo	25	40	+ 2h 09' 30"	
94	Dmitry Kozonchuk	Russia	Gazprom–RusVelo	33	145	+ 4h 57' 48"	
95	Sergey Lagutin	Russia	Gazprom–RusVelo	36	157	+ 5h 14' 55"	
96	Ivan Rovny	Russia	Gazprom–RusVelo	29	119	+ 4h 20' 36"	
97	Ivan Savitskiy †	Russia	Gazprom–RusVelo	25	DNF-15	–	
98	Evgeny Shalunov †	Russia	Gazprom–RusVelo	25	123	+ 4h 23' 42"	
99	Alexey Tsatevich	Russia	Gazprom–RusVelo	27	121	+ 4h 23' 31"	
100	André Greipel	Germany	Lotto–Soudal	34	DNS-14	–	
101	Lars Bak	Denmark	Lotto–Soudal	37	118	+ 4h 20' 06"	
102	Sean De Bie	Belgium	Lotto–Soudal	25	DNF-16	–	
103	Jasper De Buyst †	Belgium	Lotto–Soudal	23	DNF-18	–	
104	Bart De Clercq	Belgium	Lotto–Soudal	30	DNF-15	–	
105	Adam Hansen	Australia	Lotto–Soudal	35	93	+ 3h 46' 52"	
106	Moreno Hofland	Netherlands	Lotto–Soudal	25	139	+ 4h 39' 29"	
107	Tomasz Marczyński	Poland	Lotto–Soudal	33	47	+ 2h 20' 09"	
109	Maxime Monfort	Belgium	Lotto–Soudal	34	13	+ 21' 59"	
111	Nairo Quintana	Colombia	Movistar Team	27	2	+ 31"	
112	Andrey Amador	Costa Rica	Movistar Team	30	18	+ 37' 49"	
113	Winner Anacona	Colombia	Movistar Team	28	25	+ 1h 26' 41"	
114	Daniele Bennati	Italy	Movistar Team	36	DNF-16	–	
115	Víctor de la Parte	Spain	Movistar Team	30	56	+ 2h 33' 47"	
116	José Herrada	Spain	Movistar Team	31	61	+ 2h 41' 01"	
117	Gorka Izagirre	Spain	Movistar Team	29	28	+ 1h 34' 21"	
118	José Joaquín Rojas	Spain	Movistar Team	31	50	+ 2h 25' 08"	
119	Rory Sutherland	Australia	Movistar Team	35	108	+ 4h 12' 42"	
121	Adam Yates †	Great Britain	Orica–Scott	24	9	+ 8' 10"	
122	Alex Edmondson †	Australia	Orica–Scott	23	DNS-16	–	
123	Caleb Ewan †	Australia	Orica–Scott	22	DNF-15	–	
124	Michael Hepburn	Australia	Orica–Scott	25	122	+ 4h 23' 34"	
125	Christopher Juul-Jensen	Denmark	Orica–Scott	27	109	+ 4h 13' 51"	
126	Luka Mezgec	Slovenia	Orica–Scott	28	107	+ 4h 11' 59"	
127	Rubén Plaza	Spain	Orica–Scott	37	30	+ 1h 36' 26"	
128	Svein Tuft	Canada	Orica–Scott	39	142	+ 4h 44' 25"	
129	Carlos Verona †	Spain	Orica–Scott	24	57	+ 2h 34' 13"	
131	Bob Jungels †	Luxembourg	Quick-Step Floors	24	8	+ 7' 04"	
132	Eros Capecchi	Italy	Quick-Step Floors	30	58	+ 2h 35' 30"	
133	Laurens De Plus †	Belgium	Quick-Step Floors	21	24	+ 1h 20' 00"	
134	Dries Devenyns	Belgium	Quick-Step Floors	33	89	+ 3h 37' 43"	
135	Fernando Gaviria †	Colombia	Quick-Step Floors	22	129	+ 4h 30' 27"	
136	Iljo Keisse	Belgium	Quick-Step Floors	34	144	+ 4h 51' 25"	
137	Davide Martinelli †	Italy	Quick-Step Floors	23	153	+ 5h 06' 02"	
138	Maximiliano Richeze	Argentina	Quick-Step Floors	34	148	+ 5h 03' 27"	
139	Pieter Serry	Belgium	Quick-Step Floors	28	105	+ 4h 11' 00"	
141	Nathan Haas	Australia	Team Dimension Data	28	DNF-11	–	
142	Igor Antón	Spain	Team Dimension Data	34	62	+ 2h 50' 11"	
143	Natnael Berhane	Eritrea	Team Dimension Data	26	59	+ 2h 36' 41"	
144	Omar Fraile	Spain	Team Dimension Data	26	65	+ 3h 00' 21"	
145	Ryan Gibbons †	South Africa	Team Dimension Data	22	DNS-16	–	
146	Jacques Janse Van Rensburg	South Africa	Team Dimension Data	29	36	+ 1h 58' 49"	
147	Kristian Sbaragli	Italy	Team Dimension Data	26	101	+ 4h 02' 55"	
148	Daniel Teklehaimanot	Eritrea	Team Dimension Data	28	111	+ 4h 14' 04"	
149	Johann van Zyl	South Africa	Team Dimension Data	26	149	+ 5h 04' 06"	
151	Ilnur Zakarin	Russia	Team Katusha–Alpecin	27	5	+ 1' 56"	
152	Maxim Belkov	Russia	Team Katusha–Alpecin	32	125	+ 4h 26' 36"	
153	José Gonçalves	Portugal	Team Katusha–Alpecin	28	60	+ 2h 38' 06"	
154	Robert Kišerlovski	Croatia	Team Katusha–Alpecin	30	31	+ 1h 36' 28"	
155	Pavel Kochetkov	Russia	Team Katusha–Alpecin	31	DNF-4	–	
156	Vyacheslav Kuznetsov	Russia	Team Katusha–Alpecin	27	132	+ 4h 31' 58"	
157	Alberto Losada	Spain	Team Katusha–Alpecin	35	147	+ 5h 02' 25"	
158	Matvey Mamykin †	Russia	Team Katusha–Alpecin	22	87	+ 3h 33' 28"	
159	Ángel Vicioso	Spain	Team Katusha–Alpecin	40	DNS-21	–	
161	Steven Kruijswijk	Netherlands	LottoNL–Jumbo	29	DNS-20	–	
162	Enrico Battaglin	Italy	LottoNL–Jumbo	27	64	+ 2h 56' 17"	
163	Victor Campenaerts	Belgium	LottoNL–Jumbo	25	DNF-16	–	
164	Twan Castelijns	Netherlands	LottoNL–Jumbo	28	130	+ 4h 30' 36"	
165	Stef Clement	Netherlands	LottoNL–Jumbo	34	23	+ 1h 14' 00"	
166	Martijn Keizer	Netherlands	LottoNL–Jumbo	29	116	+ 4h 18' 36"	
167	Bram Tankink	Netherlands	LottoNL–Jumbo	38	DNF-19	–	
168	Jurgen Van Den Broeck	Belgium	LottoNL–Jumbo	34	91	+ 3h 44' 13"	
169	Jos van Emden	Netherlands	LottoNL–Jumbo	32	117	+ 4h 18' 47"	
171	Mikel Landa	Spain	Team Sky	27	17	+ 37' 09"	
172	Philip Deignan	Ireland	Team Sky	33	37	+ 2h 00' 45"	
173	Kenny Elissonde	France	Team Sky	25	DNF-16	–	
174	Michał Gołaś	Poland	Team Sky	33	141	+ 4h 40' 34"	
175	Sebastián Henao †	Colombia	Team Sky	23	33	+ 1h 44' 04"	
176	Vasil Kiryienka	Belarus	Team Sky	35	102	+ 4h 05' 01"	
177	Salvatore Puccio	Italy	Team Sky	27	86	+ 3h 30' 11"	
178	Diego Rosa	Italy	Team Sky	28	55	+ 2h 33' 01"	
179	Geraint Thomas	Great Britain	Team Sky	30	DNS-13	–	
181	Tom Dumoulin	Netherlands	Team Sunweb	26	1	90h 34' 54"	
182	Phil Bauhaus †	Germany	Team Sunweb	22	DNF-17	–	
183	Simon Geschke	Germany	Team Sunweb	31	54	+ 2h 30' 05"	
184	Chad Haga	United States	Team Sunweb	28	82	+ 3h 28' 41"	
185	Wilco Kelderman	Netherlands	Team Sunweb	26	DNF-9	–	
186	Sindre Skjøstad Lunke †	Norway	Team Sunweb	24	120	+ 4h 22' 58"	
187	Georg Preidler	Austria	Team Sunweb	26	71	+ 3h 09' 18"	
188	Tom Stamsnijder	Netherlands	Team Sunweb	31	154	+ 5h 06' 10"	
189	Laurens ten Dam	Netherlands	Team Sunweb	36	34	+ 1h 47' 24"	
191	Bauke Mollema	Netherlands	Trek–Segafredo	30	7	+ 3' 41"	
192	Eugenio Alafaci	Italy	Trek–Segafredo	26	146	+ 4h 58' 43"	
193	Julien Bernard †	France	Trek–Segafredo	25	42	+ 2h 14' 18"	
194	Laurent Didier	Luxembourg	Trek–Segafredo	32	DNF-11	–	
195	Jesús Hernández	Spain	Trek–Segafredo	35	49	+ 2h 24' 32"	
196	Giacomo Nizzolo	Italy	Trek–Segafredo	28	DNS-11	–	
197	Mads Pedersen †	Denmark	Trek–Segafredo	21	138	+ 4h 37' 52"	
198	Peter Stetina	United States	Trek–Segafredo	29	46	+ 2h 19' 20"	
199	Jasper Stuyven †	Belgium	Trek–Segafredo	25	98	+ 3h 54' 52"	
201	Rui Costa	Portugal	UAE Team Emirates	30	27	+ 1h 33' 17"	
202	Valerio Conti †	Italy	UAE Team Emirates	24	68	+ 3h 05' 10"	
203	Roberto Ferrari	Italy	UAE Team Emirates	34	150	+ 5h 04' 10"	
204	Marco Marcato	Italy	UAE Team Emirates	33	113	+ 4h 15' 19"	
205	Sacha Modolo	Italy	UAE Team Emirates	29	DNF-17	–	
206	Matej Mohorič †	Slovenia	UAE Team Emirates	22	135	+ 4h 34' 06"	
207	Edward Ravasi †	Italy	UAE Team Emirates	22	80	+ 3h 26' 47"	
208	Simone Petilli †	Italy	UAE Team Emirates	24	26	+ 1h 29' 34"	
209	Jan Polanc †	Slovenia	UAE Team Emirates	24	11	+ 18' 06"	
211	Filippo Pozzato	Italy	Wilier Triestina–Selle Italia	35	104	+ 4h 10' 33"	
212	Julen Amezqueta †	Spain	Wilier Triestina–Selle Italia	23	99	+ 3h 56' 48"	
213	Matteo Busato	Italy	Wilier Triestina–Selle Italia	29	84	+ 3h 28' 55"	
214	Giuseppe Fonzi	Italy	Wilier Triestina–Selle Italia	25	161	+ 5h 48' 40"	
215	Ilia Koshevoy	Belarus	Wilier Triestina–Selle Italia	26	155	+ 5h 11' 02"	
216	Jakub Mareczko †	Italy	Wilier Triestina–Selle Italia	23	DNS-14	–	
217	Daniel Martínez †	Colombia	Wilier Triestina–Selle Italia	21	DNS-17	–	
218	Cristián Rodríguez †	Spain	Wilier Triestina–Selle Italia	22	52	+ 2h 27' 56"	
219	Eugert Zhupa	Albania	Wilier Triestina–Selle Italia	27	140	+ 4h 40' 05"	

=== By team ===
Bahrain–Merida (TBM)
No.	Rider	Pos.
1	Vincenzo Nibali (ITA)	3
2	Valerio Agnoli (ITA)	110
3	Manuele Boaro (ITA)	74
4	Enrico Gasparotto (ITA)	76
5	Javier Moreno (ESP)	DSQ-4
6	Franco Pellizotti (ITA)	21
7	Luka Pibernik (SLO) †	100
8	Kanstantsin Sivtsov (BLR)	35
9	Giovanni Visconti (ITA)	DNF-20

AG2R La Mondiale (ALM)
No.	Rider	Pos.
11	Domenico Pozzovivo (ITA)	6
12	Julien Bérard (FRA)	131
13	François Bidard (FRA) †	39
14	Clément Chevrier (FRA) †	81
15	Hubert Dupont (FRA)	19
16	Ben Gastauer (LUX)	29
17	Alexandre Geniez (FRA)	DNF-4
18	Quentin Jaurégui (FRA) †	90
19	Matteo Montaguti (ITA)	51

Astana (AST)
No.	Rider	Pos.
21	~~Michele Scarponi (ITA)~~	died while training for tournament, not replaced
22	Dario Cataldo (ITA)	14
23	Pello Bilbao (ESP)	66
24	Zhandos Bizhigitov (KAZ)	160
25	Jesper Hansen (DEN)	32
26	Tanel Kangert (EST)	DNF-15
27	Luis León Sánchez (ESP)	43
28	Paolo Tiralongo (ITA)	83
29	Andrey Zeits (KAZ)	63

Bardiani–CSF (BAR)
No.	Rider	Pos.
31	~~Stefano Pirazzi (ITA)~~	-
32	Vincenzo Albanese (ITA) †	DNS-16
33	Simone Andreetta (ITA) †	156
34	Enrico Barbin (ITA)	124
35	Nicola Boem (ITA)	152
36	Giulio Ciccone (ITA) †	95
37	Mirco Maestri (ITA)	143
38	Lorenzo Rota (ITA) †	151
39	~~Nicola Ruffoni (ITA)~~	-

BMC Racing Team (BMC)
No.	Rider	Pos.
41	Tejay van Garderen (USA)	20
42	Rohan Dennis (AUS)	DNF-4
43	Silvan Dillier (SUI)	67
44	Ben Hermans (BEL)	DNF-16
45	Manuel Quinziato (ITA)	133
46	Joey Rosskopf (USA)	70
47	Manuel Senni (ITA) †	79
48	Dylan Teuns (BEL) †	75
49	Francisco Ventoso (ESP)	94

Bora–Hansgrohe (BOH)
No.	Rider	Pos.
51	Jan Bárta (CZE)	127
52	Cesare Benedetti (ITA)	115
53	Sam Bennett (IRL)	158
54	Patrick Konrad (AUT)	16
55	José Mendes (POR)	48
56	Gregor Mühlberger (AUT) †	41
57	Matteo Pelucchi (ITA)	HD-10
58	Lukas Pöstlberger (AUT) †	114
59	Rüdiger Selig (GER)	DNF-15

Cannondale–Drapac (CDT)
No.	Rider	Pos.
61	Pierre Rolland (FRA)	22
62	Hugh Carthy (GBR) †	92
63	Joe Dombrowski (USA)	69
64	Davide Formolo (ITA) †	10
65	Alex Howes (USA)	136
66	Kristijan Koren (SLO)	128
67	Tom-Jelte Slagter (NED)	77
68	Davide Villella (ITA)	72
69	Michael Woods (CAN)	38

CCC–Sprandi–Polkowice (CCC)
No.	Rider	Pos.
71	Jan Hirt (CZE)	12
72	Marcin Białobłocki (POL)	159
73	Felix Großschartner (AUT) †	78
74	Łukasz Owsian (POL)	88
75	Maciej Paterski (POL)	137
76	Simone Ponzi (ITA)	126
77	Branislau Samoilau (BLR)	112
78	Michal Schlegel (CZE) †	45
79	Jan Tratnik (SLO)	106

FDJ (FDJ)
No.	Rider	Pos.
81	Thibaut Pinot (FRA)	4
82	William Bonnet (FRA)	DNS-16
83	Matthieu Ladagnous (FRA)	97
84	Tobias Ludvigsson (SWE)	85
85	Rudy Molard (FRA)	44
86	Steve Morabito (SUI)	53
87	Sébastien Reichenbach (SUI)	15
88	Jérémy Roy (FRA)	73
89	Benoît Vaugrenard (FRA)	103

Gazprom–RusVelo (GAZ)
No.	Rider	Pos.
91	Sergey Firsanov (RUS)	96
92	Pavel Brutt (RUS)	134
93	Alexander Foliforov (RUS) †	40
94	Dmitry Kozonchuk (RUS)	145
95	Sergey Lagutin (RUS)	157
96	Ivan Rovny (RUS)	119
97	Ivan Savitskiy (RUS) †	DNF-15
98	Evgeny Shalunov (RUS) †	123
99	Alexey Tsatevich (RUS)	121

Lotto–Soudal (LTS)
No.	Rider	Pos.
100	André Greipel (GER)	DNS-14
101	Lars Bak (DEN)	118
102	Sean De Bie (BEL)	DNF-16
103	Jasper De Buyst (BEL) †	DNF-18
104	Bart De Clercq (BEL)	DNF-15
105	Adam Hansen (AUS)	93
106	Moreno Hofland (NED)	139
107	Tomasz Marczyński (POL)	47
109	Maxime Monfort (BEL)	13

Movistar Team (MOV)
No.	Rider	Pos.
111	Nairo Quintana (COL)	2
112	Andrey Amador (CRC)	18
113	Winner Anacona (COL)	25
114	Daniele Bennati (ITA)	DNF-16
115	Víctor de la Parte (ESP)	56
116	José Herrada (ESP)	61
117	Gorka Izagirre (ESP)	28
118	José Joaquín Rojas (ESP)	50
119	Rory Sutherland (AUS)	108

Orica–Scott (ORS)
No.	Rider	Pos.
121	Adam Yates (GBR) †	9
122	Alex Edmondson (AUS) †	DNS-16
123	Caleb Ewan (AUS) †	DNF-15
124	Michael Hepburn (AUS)	122
125	Christopher Juul-Jensen (DEN)	109
126	Luka Mezgec (SLO)	107
127	Rubén Plaza (ESP)	30
128	Svein Tuft (CAN)	142
129	Carlos Verona (ESP) †	57

Quick-Step Floors (QST)
No.	Rider	Pos.
131	Bob Jungels (LUX) †	8
132	Eros Capecchi (ITA)	58
133	Laurens De Plus (BEL) †	24
134	Dries Devenyns (BEL)	89
135	Fernando Gaviria (COL) †	129
136	Iljo Keisse (BEL)	144
137	Davide Martinelli (ITA) †	153
138	Maximiliano Richeze (ARG)	148
139	Pieter Serry (BEL)	105

Team Dimension Data (DDD)
No.	Rider	Pos.
141	Nathan Haas (AUS)	DNF-11
142	Igor Antón (ESP)	62
143	Natnael Berhane (ERI)	59
144	Omar Fraile (ESP)	65
145	Ryan Gibbons (RSA) †	DNS-16
146	Jacques Janse Van Rensburg (RSA)	36
147	Kristian Sbaragli (ITA)	101
148	Daniel Teklehaimanot (ERI)	111
149	Johann van Zyl (RSA)	149

Team Katusha–Alpecin (KAT)
No.	Rider	Pos.
151	Ilnur Zakarin (RUS)	5
152	Maxim Belkov (RUS)	125
153	José Gonçalves (POR)	60
154	Robert Kišerlovski (CRO)	31
155	Pavel Kochetkov (RUS)	DNF-4
156	Vyacheslav Kuznetsov (RUS)	132
157	Alberto Losada (ESP)	147
158	Matvey Mamykin (RUS) †	87
159	Ángel Vicioso (ESP)	DNS-21

LottoNL–Jumbo (TLJ)
No.	Rider	Pos.
161	Steven Kruijswijk (NED)	DNS-20
162	Enrico Battaglin (ITA)	64
163	Victor Campenaerts (BEL)	DNF-16
164	Twan Castelijns (NED)	130
165	Stef Clement (NED)	23
166	Martijn Keizer (NED)	116
167	Bram Tankink (NED)	DNF-19
168	Jurgen Van Den Broeck (BEL)	91
169	Jos van Emden (NED)	117

Team Sky (SKY)
No.	Rider	Pos.
171	Mikel Landa (ESP)	17
172	Philip Deignan (IRL)	37
173	Kenny Elissonde (FRA)	DNF-16
174	Michał Gołaś (POL)	141
175	Sebastián Henao (COL) †	33
176	Vasil Kiryienka (BLR)	102
177	Salvatore Puccio (ITA)	86
178	Diego Rosa (ITA)	55
179	Geraint Thomas (GBR)	DNS-13

Team Sunweb (SUN)
No.	Rider	Pos.
181	Tom Dumoulin (NED)	1
182	Phil Bauhaus (GER) †	DNF-17
183	Simon Geschke (GER)	54
184	Chad Haga (USA)	82
185	Wilco Kelderman (NED)	DNF-9
186	Sindre Skjøstad Lunke (NOR) †	120
187	Georg Preidler (AUT)	71
188	Tom Stamsnijder (NED)	154
189	Laurens ten Dam (NED)	34

Trek–Segafredo (TFS)
No.	Rider	Pos.
191	Bauke Mollema (NED)	7
192	Eugenio Alafaci (ITA)	146
193	Julien Bernard (FRA) †	42
194	Laurent Didier (LUX)	DNF-11
195	Jesús Hernández (ESP)	49
196	Giacomo Nizzolo (ITA)	DNS-11
197	Mads Pedersen (DEN)	138
198	Peter Stetina (USA)	46
199	Jasper Stuyven (BEL) †	98

UAE Team Emirates (UAD)
No.	Rider	Pos.
201	Rui Costa (POR)	27
202	Valerio Conti (ITA) †	68
203	Roberto Ferrari (ITA)	150
204	Marco Marcato (ITA)	113
205	Sacha Modolo (ITA)	DNF-17
206	Matej Mohorič (SLO)	135
207	Edward Ravasi (ITA) †	80
208	Simone Petilli (ITA) †	26
209	Jan Polanc (SLO) †	11

Wilier Triestina–Selle Italia (WIL)
No.	Rider	Pos.
211	Filippo Pozzato (ITA)	104
212	Julen Amezqueta (ESP) †	99
213	Matteo Busato (ITA)	84
214	Giuseppe Fonzi (ITA)	161
215	Ilia Koshevoy (BLR)	155
216	Jakub Mareczko (ITA) †	DNS-14
217	Daniel Martínez (COL) †	DNS-17
218	Cristián Rodríguez (ESP) †	52
219	Eugert Zhupa (ALB)	140

=== By nationality ===
The 195 riders that are competing in the 2017 Giro d'Italia originated from 32 different countries.

Country	No. of riders	Finishers	Stage wins
Albania	1	1	
Argentina	1	1	
Australia	7	3	1 (Caleb Ewan)
Austria	5	5	1 (Lukas Pöstlberger)
Belarus	4	4	
Belgium	13	8	
Canada	2	2	
Colombia	5	4	5 (Fernando Gaviria x4, Nairo Quintana)
Costa Rica	1	1	
Croatia	1	1	
Czech Republic	3	3	
Denmark	4	4	
Eritrea	2	2	
Estonia	1	0	
France	15	12	2 (Pierre Rolland, Thibaut Pinot)
Germany	4	1	1 (André Greipel)
Great Britain	3	2	
Ireland	2	2	
Italy	43	36	1 (Vincenzo Nibali)
Kazakhstan	2	2	
Luxembourg	3	2	1 (Bob Jungels)
Netherlands	13	10	3 (Tom Dumoulin x2, Jos van Emden)
Norway	1	1	
Poland	5	5	
Portugal	3	3	
Russia	14	12	
Slovenia	6	6	1 (Jan Polanc)
South Africa	3	2	
Spain	18	16	3 (Gorka Izagirre, Omar Fraile, Mikel Landa)
Sweden	1	1	
Switzerland	3	3	1 (Silvan Dillier)
United States	6	6	1 (Tejay van Garderen)
Total	195	161	21
