= 2017 Giro d'Italia, Stage 1 to Stage 11 =

Cycling race stages

The 2017 Giro d'Italia began on 5 May, and stage 11 occurred on 17 May. The race began in Alghero on the island of Sardinia.

Legend
A pink jersey	Denotes the leader of the General classification	A blue jersey	Denotes the leader of the Mountains classification
A violet jersey	Denotes the leader of the Points classification	A white jersey	Denotes the leader of the Young rider classification

== Stage 1 ==
5 May 2017 — Alghero to Olbia, 206 km (128.0 mi)

Stage 1 result
Rank	Rider	Team	Time
1	Lukas Pöstlberger (AUT)	Bora–Hansgrohe	5h 13' 35"
2	Caleb Ewan (AUS)	Orica–Scott	+ 0"
3	André Greipel (GER)	Lotto–Soudal	+ 0"
4	Giacomo Nizzolo (ITA)	Trek–Segafredo	+ 0"
5	Sacha Modolo (ITA)	UAE Team Emirates	+ 0"
6	Kristian Sbaragli (ITA)	Team Dimension Data	+ 0"
7	Jasper Stuyven (BEL)	Trek–Segafredo	+ 0"
8	Ryan Gibbons (RSA)	Team Dimension Data	+ 0"
9	Sam Bennett (IRL)	Bora–Hansgrohe	+ 0"
10	Phil Bauhaus (GER)	Team Sunweb	+ 0"

General classification after Stage 1
Rank	Rider	Team	Time
1	Lukas Pöstlberger (AUT)	Bora–Hansgrohe	5h 13' 25"
2	Caleb Ewan (AUS)	Orica–Scott	+ 4"
3	André Greipel (GER)	Lotto–Soudal	+ 6"
4	Pavel Brutt (RUS)	Gazprom–RusVelo	+ 8"
5	Giacomo Nizzolo (ITA)	Trek–Segafredo	+ 10"
6	Sacha Modolo (ITA)	UAE Team Emirates	+ 10"
7	Kristian Sbaragli (ITA)	Team Dimension Data	+ 10"
8	Jasper Stuyven (BEL)	Trek–Segafredo	+ 10"
9	Ryan Gibbons (RSA)	Team Dimension Data	+ 10"
10	Sam Bennett (IRL)	Bora–Hansgrohe	+ 10"

== Stage 2 ==
6 May 2017 — Olbia to Tortolì, 221 km (137 mi)

Stage 2 result
Rank	Rider	Team	Time
1	André Greipel (GER)	Lotto–Soudal	6h 05' 18"
2	Roberto Ferrari (ITA)	UAE Team Emirates	+ 0"
3	Jasper Stuyven (BEL)	Trek–Segafredo	+ 0"
4	Fernando Gaviria (COL)	Quick-Step Floors	+ 0"
5	Kristian Sbaragli (ITA)	Team Dimension Data	+ 0"
6	Enrico Battaglin (ITA)	LottoNL–Jumbo	+ 0"
7	Ryan Gibbons (RSA)	Team Dimension Data	+ 0"
8	Geraint Thomas (GBR)	Team Sky	+ 0"
9	Caleb Ewan (AUS)	Orica–Scott	+ 0"
10	Rui Costa (POR)	UAE Team Emirates	+ 0"

General classification after Stage 2
Rank	Rider	Team	Time
1	André Greipel (GER)	Lotto–Soudal	11h 18' 39"
2	Lukas Pöstlberger (AUT)	Bora–Hansgrohe	+ 4"
3	Caleb Ewan (AUS)	Orica–Scott	+ 8"
4	Roberto Ferrari (ITA)	UAE Team Emirates	+ 8"
5	Jasper Stuyven (BEL)	Trek–Segafredo	+ 10"
6	Pavel Brutt (RUS)	Gazprom–RusVelo	+ 12"
7	Kristian Sbaragli (ITA)	Team Dimension Data	+ 14"
8	Ryan Gibbons (RSA)	Team Dimension Data	+ 14"
9	Fernando Gaviria (COL)	Quick-Step Floors	+ 14"
10	Enrico Battaglin (ITA)	LottoNL–Jumbo	+ 14"

== Stage 3 ==
7 May 2017 — Tortolì to Cagliari, 148 km (92 mi)

Stage 3 result
Rank	Rider	Team	Time
1	Fernando Gaviria (COL)	Quick-Step Floors	3h 26' 33"
2	Rüdiger Selig (GER)	Bora–Hansgrohe	+ 0"
3	Giacomo Nizzolo (ITA)	Trek–Segafredo	+ 0"
4	Nathan Haas (AUS)	Team Dimension Data	+ 0"
5	Maximiliano Richeze (ARG)	Quick-Step Floors	+ 0"
6	Kanstantsin Sivtsov (BLR)	Bahrain–Merida	+ 3"
7	Bob Jungels (LUX)	Quick-Step Floors	+ 3"
8	Caleb Ewan (AUS)	Orica–Scott	+ 13"
9	Sacha Modolo (ITA)	UAE Team Emirates	+ 13"
10	André Greipel (GER)	Lotto–Soudal	+ 13"

General classification after Stage 3
Rank	Rider	Team	Time
1	Fernando Gaviria (COL)	Quick-Step Floors	14h 45' 16"
2	André Greipel (GER)	Lotto–Soudal	+ 9"
3	Lukas Pöstlberger (AUT)	Bora–Hansgrohe	+ 13"
4	Bob Jungels (LUX)	Quick-Step Floors	+ 13"
5	Kanstantsin Sivtsov (BLR)	Bahrain–Merida	+ 13"
6	Caleb Ewan (AUS)	Orica–Scott	+ 17"
7	Roberto Ferrari (ITA)	UAE Team Emirates	+ 17"
8	Ryan Gibbons (RSA)	Team Dimension Data	+ 23"
9	Enrico Battaglin (ITA)	LottoNL–Jumbo	+ 23"
10	Sacha Modolo (ITA)	UAE Team Emirates	+ 23"

== Stage 4 ==
9 May 2017 — Cefalù to Etna (Rifugio Sapienza), 181 km (112 mi)

Stage 4 result
Rank	Rider	Team	Time
1	Jan Polanc (SLO)	UAE Team Emirates	4h 55' 58"
2	Ilnur Zakarin (RUS)	Team Katusha–Alpecin	+ 19"
3	Geraint Thomas (GBR)	Team Sky	+ 29"
4	Thibaut Pinot (FRA)	FDJ	+ 29"
5	Dario Cataldo (ITA)	Astana	+ 29"
6	Tom Dumoulin (NED)	Team Sunweb	+ 29"
7	Bob Jungels (LUX)	Quick-Step Floors	+ 29"
8	Adam Yates (GBR)	Orica–Scott	+ 29"
9	Bauke Mollema (NED)	Trek–Segafredo	+ 29"
10	Vincenzo Nibali (ITA)	Bahrain–Merida	+ 29"

General classification after Stage 4
Rank	Rider	Team	Time
1	Bob Jungels (LUX)	Quick-Step Floors	19h 41' 56"
2	Geraint Thomas (GBR)	Team Sky	+ 6"
3	Adam Yates (GBR)	Orica–Scott	+ 10"
4	Vincenzo Nibali (ITA)	Bahrain–Merida	+ 10"
5	Domenico Pozzovivo (ITA)	AG2R La Mondiale	+ 10"
6	Nairo Quintana (COL)	Movistar Team	+ 10"
7	Tom Dumoulin (NED)	Team Sunweb	+ 10"
8	Bauke Mollema (NED)	Trek–Segafredo	+ 10"
9	Mikel Landa (ESP)	Team Sky	+ 10"
10	Thibaut Pinot (FRA)	FDJ	+ 10"

== Stage 5 ==
10 May 2017 — Pedara to Messina, 159 km (99 mi)

Stage 5 result
Rank	Rider	Team	Time
1	Fernando Gaviria (COL)	Quick-Step Floors	3h 40' 11"
2	Jakub Mareczko (ITA)	Wilier Triestina–Selle Italia	+ 0"
3	Sam Bennett (IRL)	Bora–Hansgrohe	+ 0"
4	André Greipel (GER)	Lotto–Soudal	+ 0"
5	Phil Bauhaus (GER)	Team Sunweb	+ 0"
6	Kristian Sbaragli (ITA)	Team Dimension Data	+ 0"
7	Ryan Gibbons (RSA)	Team Dimension Data	+ 0"
8	Roberto Ferrari (ITA)	UAE Team Emirates	+ 0"
9	Jasper Stuyven (BEL)	Trek–Segafredo	+ 0"
10	Enrico Battaglin (ITA)	LottoNL–Jumbo	+ 0"

General classification after Stage 5
Rank	Rider	Team	Time
1	Bob Jungels (LUX)	Quick-Step Floors	23h 22' 07"
2	Geraint Thomas (GBR)	Team Sky	+ 6"
3	Adam Yates (GBR)	Orica–Scott	+ 10"
4	Domenico Pozzovivo (ITA)	AG2R La Mondiale	+ 10"
5	Vincenzo Nibali (ITA)	Bahrain–Merida	+ 10"
6	Tom Dumoulin (NED)	Team Sunweb	+ 10"
7	Nairo Quintana (COL)	Movistar Team	+ 10"
8	Bauke Mollema (NED)	Trek–Segafredo	+ 10"
9	Tejay van Garderen (USA)	BMC Racing Team	+ 10"
10	Andrey Amador (CRC)	Movistar Team	+ 10"

== Stage 6 ==
11 May 2017 — Reggio Calabria to Terme Luigiane, 217 km (135 mi)

Stage 6 result
Rank	Rider	Team	Time
1	Silvan Dillier (SUI)	BMC Racing Team	4h 58' 01"
2	Jasper Stuyven (BEL)	Trek–Segafredo	+ 0"
3	Lukas Pöstlberger (AUT)	Bora–Hansgrohe	+ 12"
4	Simone Andreetta (ITA)	Bardiani–CSF	+ 26"
5	Michael Woods (CAN)	Cannondale–Drapac	+ 39"
6	Adam Yates (GBR)	Orica–Scott	+ 39"
7	Wilco Kelderman (NED)	Team Sunweb	+ 39"
8	Bob Jungels (LUX)	Quick-Step Floors	+ 39"
9	Bauke Mollema (NED)	Trek–Segafredo	+ 39"
10	Geraint Thomas (GBR)	Team Sky	+ 39"

General classification after Stage 6
Rank	Rider	Team	Time
1	Bob Jungels (LUX)	Quick-Step Floors	28h 20' 47"
2	Geraint Thomas (GBR)	Team Sky	+ 6"
3	Adam Yates (GBR)	Orica–Scott	+ 10"
4	Vincenzo Nibali (ITA)	Bahrain–Merida	+ 10"
5	Domenico Pozzovivo (ITA)	AG2R La Mondiale	+ 10"
6	Nairo Quintana (COL)	Movistar Team	+ 10"
7	Tom Dumoulin (NED)	Team Sunweb	+ 10"
8	Bauke Mollema (NED)	Trek–Segafredo	+ 10"
9	Tejay van Garderen (USA)	BMC Racing Team	+ 10"
10	Andrey Amador (CRC)	Movistar Team	+ 10"

== Stage 7 ==
12 May 2017 — Castrovillari to Alberobello, 224 km (139 mi)

Stage 7 result
Rank	Rider	Team	Time
1	Caleb Ewan (AUS)	Orica–Scott	5h 35' 18"
2	Fernando Gaviria (COL)	Quick-Step Floors	+ 0"
3	Sam Bennett (IRL)	Bora–Hansgrohe	+ 0"
4	André Greipel (GER)	Lotto–Soudal	+ 0"
5	Jasper Stuyven (BEL)	Trek–Segafredo	+ 0"
6	Ryan Gibbons (RSA)	Team Dimension Data	+ 0"
7	Enrico Battaglin (ITA)	LottoNL–Jumbo	+ 2"
8	Rüdiger Selig (GER)	Bora–Hansgrohe	+ 2"
9	Alexey Tsatevich (RUS)	Gazprom–RusVelo	+ 2"
10	Vincenzo Nibali (ITA)	Bahrain–Merida	+ 2"

General classification after Stage 7
Rank	Rider	Team	Time
1	Bob Jungels (LUX)	Quick-Step Floors	33h 56' 07"
2	Geraint Thomas (GBR)	Team Sky	+ 6"
3	Adam Yates (GBR)	Orica–Scott	+ 10"
4	Vincenzo Nibali (ITA)	Bahrain–Merida	+ 10"
5	Domenico Pozzovivo (ITA)	AG2R La Mondiale	+ 10"
6	Tom Dumoulin (NED)	Team Sunweb	+ 10"
7	Nairo Quintana (COL)	Movistar Team	+ 10"
8	Bauke Mollema (NED)	Trek–Segafredo	+ 10"
9	Andrey Amador (CRC)	Movistar Team	+ 10"
10	Tejay van Garderen (USA)	BMC Racing Team	+ 10"

== Stage 8 ==
13 May 2017 — Molfetta to Peschici, 189 km (117 mi)

Stage 8 result
Rank	Rider	Team	Time
1	Gorka Izagirre (ESP)	Movistar Team	4h 24' 59"
2	Giovanni Visconti (ITA)	Bahrain–Merida	+ 5"
3	Luis León Sánchez (ESP)	Astana	+ 10"
4	Enrico Battaglin (ITA)	LottoNL–Jumbo	+ 12"
5	Michael Woods (CAN)	Cannondale–Drapac	+ 12"
6	Thibaut Pinot (FRA)	FDJ	+ 12"
7	Vincenzo Nibali (ITA)	Bahrain–Merida	+ 12"
8	Adam Yates (GBR)	Orica–Scott	+ 12"
9	Steven Kruijswijk (NED)	LottoNL–Jumbo	+ 12"
10	Bob Jungels (LUX)	Quick-Step Floors	+ 12"

General classification after Stage 8
Rank	Rider	Team	Time
1	Bob Jungels (LUX)	Quick-Step Floors	38h 21' 18"
2	Geraint Thomas (GBR)	Team Sky	+ 6"
3	Adam Yates (GBR)	Orica–Scott	+ 10"
4	Vincenzo Nibali (ITA)	Bahrain–Merida	+ 10"
5	Domenico Pozzovivo (ITA)	AG2R La Mondiale	+ 10"
6	Tom Dumoulin (NED)	Team Sunweb	+ 10"
7	Nairo Quintana (COL)	Movistar Team	+ 10"
8	Bauke Mollema (NED)	Trek–Segafredo	+ 10"
9	Thibaut Pinot (FRA)	FDJ	+ 10"
10	Andrey Amador (CRC)	Movistar Team	+ 10"

== Stage 9 ==
14 May 2017 — Montenero di Bisaccia to Blockhaus, 149 km (93 mi)

Stage 9 result
Rank	Rider	Team	Time
1	Nairo Quintana (COL)	Movistar Team	3h 44' 51"
2	Thibaut Pinot (FRA)	FDJ	+ 24"
3	Tom Dumoulin (NED)	Team Sunweb	+ 24"
4	Bauke Mollema (NED)	Trek–Segafredo	+ 41"
5	Vincenzo Nibali (ITA)	Bahrain–Merida	+ 1' 00"
6	Domenico Pozzovivo (ITA)	AG2R La Mondiale	+ 1' 18"
7	Tanel Kangert (EST)	Astana	+ 2' 02"
8	Ilnur Zakarin (RUS)	Team Katusha–Alpecin	+ 2' 14"
9	Sébastien Reichenbach (SUI)	FDJ	+ 2' 28"
10	Davide Formolo (ITA)	Cannondale–Drapac	+ 2' 35"

General classification after Stage 9
Rank	Rider	Team	Time
1	Nairo Quintana (COL)	Movistar Team	42h 06' 09"
2	Thibaut Pinot (FRA)	FDJ	+ 28"
3	Tom Dumoulin (NED)	Team Sunweb	+ 30"
4	Bauke Mollema (NED)	Trek–Segafredo	+ 51"
5	Vincenzo Nibali (ITA)	Bahrain–Merida	+ 1' 10"
6	Domenico Pozzovivo (ITA)	AG2R La Mondiale	+ 1' 28"
7	Ilnur Zakarin (RUS)	Team Katusha–Alpecin	+ 2' 28"
8	Davide Formolo (ITA)	Cannondale–Drapac	+ 2' 45"
9	Andrey Amador (CRC)	Movistar Team	+ 2' 53"
10	Steven Kruijswijk (NED)	LottoNL–Jumbo	+ 3' 06"

== Stage 10 ==
16 May 2017 — Foligno to Montefalco, 39.8 km (25 mi), individual time trial (ITT)

Stage 10 result
Rank	Rider	Team	Time
1	Tom Dumoulin (NED)	Team Sunweb	50' 37"
2	Geraint Thomas (GBR)	Team Sky	+ 49"
3	Bob Jungels (LUX)	Quick-Step Floors	+ 56"
4	Luis León Sánchez (ESP)	Astana	+ 1' 40"
5	Vasil Kiryienka (BLR)	Team Sky	+ 2' 00"
6	Vincenzo Nibali (ITA)	Bahrain–Merida	+ 2' 07"
7	Maxime Monfort (BEL)	Lotto–Soudal	+ 2' 13"
8	Jos van Emden (NED)	LottoNL–Jumbo	+ 2' 15"
9	Andrey Amador (CRC)	Movistar Team	+ 2' 16"
10	Bauke Mollema (NED)	Trek–Segafredo	+ 2' 17"

General classification after Stage 10
Rank	Rider	Team	Time
1	Tom Dumoulin (NED)	Team Sunweb	42h 57' 16"
2	Nairo Quintana (COL)	Movistar Team	+ 2' 23"
3	Bauke Mollema (NED)	Trek–Segafredo	+ 2' 38"
4	Thibaut Pinot (FRA)	FDJ	+ 2' 40"
5	Vincenzo Nibali (ITA)	Bahrain–Merida	+ 2' 47"
6	Bob Jungels (LUX)	Quick-Step Floors	+ 3' 56"
7	Domenico Pozzovivo (ITA)	AG2R La Mondiale	+ 4' 05"
8	Ilnur Zakarin (RUS)	Team Katusha–Alpecin	+ 4' 17"
9	Andrey Amador (CRC)	Movistar Team	+ 4' 39"
10	Steven Kruijswijk (NED)	LottoNL–Jumbo	+ 5' 19"

== Stage 11 ==
17 May 2017 — Florence (Ponte a Ema) to Bagno di Romagna, 161 km (100 mi)

Stage 11 result
Rank	Rider	Team	Time
1	Omar Fraile (ESP)	Team Dimension Data	4h 23' 14"
2	Rui Costa (POR)	UAE Team Emirates	+ 0"
3	Pierre Rolland (FRA)	Cannondale–Drapac	+ 0"
4	Tanel Kangert (EST)	Astana	+ 0"
5	Giovanni Visconti (ITA)	Bahrain–Merida	+ 0"
6	Ben Hermans (BEL)	BMC Racing Team	+ 0"
7	Dario Cataldo (ITA)	Astana	+ 0"
8	Simone Petilli (ITA)	UAE Team Emirates	+ 0"
9	Maxime Monfort (BEL)	Lotto–Soudal	+ 3"
10	Laurens De Plus (BEL)	Quick-Step Floors	+ 3"

General classification after Stage 11
Rank	Rider	Team	Time
1	Tom Dumoulin (NED)	Team Sunweb	47h 22' 07"
2	Nairo Quintana (COL)	Movistar Team	+ 2' 23"
3	Bauke Mollema (NED)	Trek–Segafredo	+ 2' 38"
4	Thibaut Pinot (FRA)	FDJ	+ 2' 40"
5	Vincenzo Nibali (ITA)	Bahrain–Merida	+ 2' 47"
6	Andrey Amador (CRI)	Movistar Team	+ 3' 05"
7	Bob Jungels (LUX)	Quick-Step Floors	+ 3' 56"
8	Tanel Kangert (EST)	Astana	+ 3' 59"
9	Domenico Pozzovivo (ITA)	AG2R La Mondiale	+ 4' 05"
10	Ilnur Zakarin (RUS)	Team Katusha–Alpecin	+ 4' 17"
