= 2017 Giro d'Italia, Stage 12 to Stage 21 =

Cycling race stages

The 2017 Giro d'Italia began on 5 May, and stage 21 will occur on 28 May.

Legend
A pink jersey	Denotes the leader of the General classification	A blue jersey	Denotes the leader of the Mountains classification
A red jersey	Denotes the leader of the Points classification	A white jersey	Denotes the leader of the Young rider classification

== Stage 12 ==
18 May 2017 — Forlì to Reggio Emilia, 229 km (142.3 mi)

Result of Stage 12
Rank	Rider	Team	Time
1	Fernando Gaviria (COL)	Quick-Step Floors	5h 18' 55"
2	Jakub Mareczko (ITA)	Wilier Triestina–Selle Italia	+ 0"
3	Sam Bennett (IRL)	Bora–Hansgrohe	+ 0"
4	Phil Bauhaus (GER)	Team Sunweb	+ 0"
5	Maximiliano Richeze (ARG)	Quick-Step Floors	+ 0"
6	Ryan Gibbons (RSA)	Team Dimension Data	+ 0"
7	Sacha Modolo (ITA)	UAE Team Emirates	+ 0"
8	André Greipel (GER)	Lotto–Soudal	+ 0"
9	Jasper Stuyven (BEL)	Trek–Segafredo	+ 0"
10	Roberto Ferrari (ITA)	UAE Team Emirates	+ 0"

General classification after Stage 12
Rank	Rider	Team	Time
1	Tom Dumoulin (NED)	Team Sunweb	52h 41' 08"
2	Nairo Quintana (COL)	Movistar Team	+ 2' 23"
3	Bauke Mollema (NED)	Trek–Segafredo	+ 2' 38"
4	Thibaut Pinot (FRA)	FDJ	+ 2' 40"
5	Vincenzo Nibali (ITA)	Bahrain–Merida	+ 2' 47"
6	Andrey Amador (CRC)	Movistar Team	+ 3' 05"
7	Bob Jungels (LUX)	Quick-Step Floors	+ 3' 56"
8	Domenico Pozzovivo (ITA)	AG2R La Mondiale	+ 3' 59"
9	Tanel Kangert (EST)	Astana	+ 3' 59"
10	Ilnur Zakarin (RUS)	Team Katusha–Alpecin	+ 4' 17"

== Stage 13 ==
19 May 2017 — Reggio Emilia to Tortona, 167 km (103.8 mi)

Result of Stage 13
Rank	Rider	Team	Time
1	Fernando Gaviria (COL)	Quick-Step Floors	3h 47' 45"
2	Sam Bennett (IRL)	Bora–Hansgrohe	+ 0"
3	Jasper Stuyven (BEL)	Trek–Segafredo	+ 0"
4	Roberto Ferrari (ITA)	UAE Team Emirates	+ 0"
5	Ryan Gibbons (RSA)	Team Dimension Data	+ 0"
6	Rüdiger Selig (GER)	Bora–Hansgrohe	+ 0"
7	Sacha Modolo (ITA)	UAE Team Emirates	+ 0"
8	Caleb Ewan (AUS)	Orica–Scott	+ 0"
9	André Greipel (GER)	Lotto–Soudal	+ 0"
10	Vyacheslav Kuznetsov (RUS)	Team Katusha–Alpecin	+ 0"

General classification after Stage 13
Rank	Rider	Team	Time
1	Tom Dumoulin (NED)	Team Sunweb	56h 28' 53"
2	Nairo Quintana (COL)	Movistar Team	+ 2' 23"
3	Bauke Mollema (NED)	Trek–Segafredo	+ 2' 38"
4	Thibaut Pinot (FRA)	FDJ	+ 2' 40"
5	Vincenzo Nibali (ITA)	Bahrain–Merida	+ 2' 47"
6	Andrey Amador (CRC)	Movistar Team	+ 3' 05"
7	Bob Jungels (LUX)	Quick-Step Floors	+ 3' 56"
8	Domenico Pozzovivo (ITA)	AG2R La Mondiale	+ 3' 59"
9	Tanel Kangert (EST)	Astana	+ 3' 59"
10	Ilnur Zakarin (RUS)	Team Katusha–Alpecin	+ 4' 17"

== Stage 14 ==
20 May 2017 — Castellania to Santuario di Oropa, 131 km (81.4 mi)

Result of Stage 14
Rank	Rider	Team	Time
1	Tom Dumoulin (NED)	Team Sunweb	3h 02' 34"
2	Ilnur Zakarin (RUS)	Team Katusha–Alpecin	+ 3"
3	Mikel Landa (ESP)	Team Sky	+ 9"
4	Nairo Quintana (COL)	Movistar Team	+ 14"
5	Thibaut Pinot (FRA)	FDJ	+ 35"
6	Adam Yates (GBR)	Orica–Scott	+ 41"
7	Vincenzo Nibali (ITA)	Bahrain–Merida	+ 43"
8	Franco Pellizotti (ITA)	Bahrain–Merida	+ 43"
9	Steven Kruijswijk (NED)	LottoNL–Jumbo	+ 46"
10	Tanel Kangert (EST)	Astana	+ 46"

General classification after Stage 14
Rank	Rider	Team	Time
1	Tom Dumoulin (NED)	Team Sunweb	59h 31' 17"
2	Nairo Quintana (COL)	Movistar Team	+ 2' 47"
3	Thibaut Pinot (FRA)	FDJ	+ 3' 25"
4	Vincenzo Nibali (ITA)	Bahrain–Merida	+ 3' 40"
5	Ilnur Zakarin (RUS)	Team Katusha–Alpecin	+ 4' 24"
6	Bauke Mollema (NED)	Trek–Segafredo	+ 4' 32"
7	Tanel Kangert (EST)	Astana	+ 4' 55"
8	Domenico Pozzovivo (ITA)	AG2R La Mondiale	+ 4' 59"
9	Bob Jungels (LUX)	Quick-Step Floors	+ 5' 28"
10	Andrey Amador (CRC)	Movistar Team	+ 5' 36"

== Stage 15 ==
21 May 2017 — Valdengo to Bergamo, 199 km (123.7 mi)

Result of Stage 15
Rank	Rider	Team	Time
1	Bob Jungels (LUX)	Quick-Step Floors	4h 16' 51"
2	Nairo Quintana (COL)	Movistar Team	+ 0"
3	Thibaut Pinot (FRA)	FDJ	+ 0"
4	Adam Yates (GBR)	Orica–Scott	+ 0"
5	Domenico Pozzovivo (ITA)	AG2R La Mondiale	+ 0"
6	Patrick Konrad (AUT)	Bora–Hansgrohe	+ 0"
7	Vincenzo Nibali (ITA)	Bahrain–Merida	+ 0"
8	Tom Dumoulin (NED)	Team Sunweb	+ 0"
9	Ilnur Zakarin (RUS)	Team Katusha–Alpecin	+ 0"
10	Bauke Mollema (NED)	Trek–Segafredo	+ 0"

General classification after Stage 15
Rank	Rider	Team	Time
1	Tom Dumoulin (NED)	Team Sunweb	63h 48' 08"
2	Nairo Quintana (COL)	Movistar Team	+ 2' 41"
3	Thibaut Pinot (FRA)	FDJ	+ 3' 21"
4	Vincenzo Nibali (ITA)	Bahrain–Merida	+ 3' 40"
5	Ilnur Zakarin (RUS)	Team Katusha–Alpecin	+ 4' 24"
6	Bauke Mollema (NED)	Trek–Segafredo	+ 4' 32"
7	Domenico Pozzovivo (ITA)	AG2R La Mondiale	+ 4' 59"
8	Bob Jungels (LUX)	Quick-Step Floors	+ 5' 18"
9	Andrey Amador (CRC)	Movistar Team	+ 6' 01"
10	Steven Kruijswijk (NED)	LottoNL–Jumbo	+ 7' 03"

== Stage 16 ==
23 May 2017 — Rovetta to Bormio, 222 km (137.9 mi)

Result of Stage 16
Rank	Rider	Team	Time
1	Vincenzo Nibali (ITA)	Bahrain–Merida	6h 24' 22"
2	Mikel Landa (ESP)	Team Sky	+ 0"
3	Nairo Quintana (COL)	Movistar Team	+ 12"
4	Domenico Pozzovivo (ITA)	AG2R La Mondiale	+ 24"
5	Ilnur Zakarin (RUS)	Team Katusha–Alpecin	+ 34"
6	Davide Formolo (ITA)	Cannondale–Drapac	+ 1' 26"
7	Bauke Mollema (NED)	Trek–Segafredo	+ 1' 35"
8	Bob Jungels (LUX)	Quick-Step Floors	+ 1' 35"
9	Adam Yates (GBR)	Orica–Scott	+ 1' 35"
10	Thibaut Pinot (FRA)	FDJ	+ 1' 35"

General classification after Stage 16
Rank	Rider	Team	Time
1	Tom Dumoulin (NED)	Team Sunweb	70h 14' 48"
2	Nairo Quintana (COL)	Movistar Team	+ 31"
3	Vincenzo Nibali (ITA)	Bahrain–Merida	+ 1' 12"
4	Thibaut Pinot (FRA)	FDJ	+ 2' 38"
5	Ilnur Zakarin (RUS)	Team Katusha–Alpecin	+ 2' 40"
6	Domenico Pozzovivo (ITA)	AG2R La Mondiale	+ 3' 05"
7	Bauke Mollema (NED)	Trek–Segafredo	+ 3' 49"
8	Bob Jungels (LUX)	Quick-Step Floors	+ 4' 35"
9	Steven Kruijswijk (NED)	LottoNL–Jumbo	+ 6' 20"
10	Adam Yates (GBR)	Orica–Scott	+ 7' 00"

== Stage 17 ==
24 May 2017 — Tirano to Canazei, 219 km (136.1 mi)

Result of Stage 17
Rank	Rider	Team	Time
1	Pierre Rolland (FRA)	Cannondale–Drapac	5h 42' 56"
2	Rui Costa (POR)	UAE Team Emirates	+ 24"
3	Gorka Izagirre (ESP)	Movistar Team	+ 24"
4	Rory Sutherland (AUS)	Movistar Team	+ 24"
5	Matteo Busato (ITA)	Wilier Triestina–Selle Italia	+ 24"
6	Dries Devenyns (BEL)	Quick-Step Floors	+ 24"
7	Felix Großschartner (AUT)	CCC–Sprandi–Polkowice	+ 24"
8	Omar Fraile (ESP)	Team Dimension Data	+ 24"
9	Michael Woods (CAN)	Cannondale–Drapac	+ 24"
10	Julien Bernard (FRA)	Trek–Segafredo	+ 24"

General classification after Stage 17
Rank	Rider	Team	Time
1	Tom Dumoulin (NED)	Team Sunweb	76h 05' 38"
2	Nairo Quintana (COL)	Movistar Team	+ 31"
3	Vincenzo Nibali (ITA)	Bahrain–Merida	+ 1' 12"
4	Thibaut Pinot (FRA)	FDJ	+ 2' 38"
5	Ilnur Zakarin (RUS)	Team Katusha–Alpecin	+ 2' 40"
6	Domenico Pozzovivo (ITA)	AG2R La Mondiale	+ 3' 05"
7	Bauke Mollema (NED)	Trek–Segafredo	+ 3' 49"
8	Bob Jungels (LUX)	Quick-Step Floors	+ 4' 35"
9	Steven Kruijswijk (NED)	LottoNL–Jumbo	+ 6' 20"
10	Jan Polanc (SLO)	UAE Team Emirates	+ 6' 33"

== Stage 18 ==
25 May 2017 — Moena to Ortisei/St. Ulrich, 137 km (85.1 mi)

Result of Stage 18
Rank	Rider	Team	Time
1	Tejay van Garderen (USA)	BMC Racing Team	3h 54' 04"
2	Mikel Landa (ESP)	Team Sky	+ 0"
3	Thibaut Pinot (FRA)	FDJ	+ 8"
4	Domenico Pozzovivo (ITA)	AG2R La Mondiale	+ 8"
5	Jan Hirt (CZE)	CCC–Sprandi–Polkowice	+ 11"
6	Ilnur Zakarin (RUS)	Team Katusha–Alpecin	+ 24"
7	Steven Kruijswijk (NED)	LottoNL–Jumbo	+ 34"
8	Bauke Mollema (NED)	Trek–Segafredo	+ 34"
9	Tom Dumoulin (NED)	Team Sunweb	+ 1' 06"
10	Nairo Quintana (COL)	Movistar Team	+ 1' 06"

General classification after Stage 18
Rank	Rider	Team	Time
1	Tom Dumoulin (NED)	Team Sunweb	80h 00' 48"
2	Nairo Quintana (COL)	Movistar Team	+ 31"
3	Vincenzo Nibali (ITA)	Bahrain–Merida	+ 1' 12"
4	Thibaut Pinot (FRA)	FDJ	+ 1' 36"
5	Ilnur Zakarin (RUS)	Team Katusha–Alpecin	+ 1' 58"
6	Domenico Pozzovivo (ITA)	AG2R La Mondiale	+ 2' 07"
7	Bauke Mollema (NED)	Trek–Segafredo	+ 3' 17"
8	Steven Kruijswijk (NED)	LottoNL–Jumbo	+ 5' 48"
9	Adam Yates (GBR)	Orica–Scott	+ 7' 06"
10	Bob Jungels (LUX)	Quick-Step Floors	+ 7' 34"

== Stage 19 ==
26 May 2017 — Innichen/San Candido to Piancavallo 191 km (118.7 mi)

Result of Stage 19
Rank	Rider	Team	Time
1	Mikel Landa (ESP)	Team Sky	4h 53' 00"
2	Rui Costa (POR)	UAE Team Emirates	+ 1' 49"
3	Pierre Rolland (FRA)	Cannondale–Drapac	+ 1' 54"
4	Pello Bilbao (ESP)	Astana	+ 2' 12"
5	Sebastián Henao (COL)	Team Sky	+ 3' 06"
6	Evgeny Shalunov (RUS)	Gazprom–RusVelo	+ 3' 51"
7	Luis León Sánchez (ESP)	Astana	+ 3' 51"
8	Matteo Busato (ITA)	Wilier Triestina–Selle Italia	+ 5' 05"
9	Lorenzo Rota (ITA)	Bardiani–CSF	+ 5' 05"
10	Ilia Koshevoy (BLR)	Wilier Triestina–Selle Italia	+ 6' 44"

General classification after Stage 19
Rank	Rider	Team	Time
1	Nairo Quintana (COL)	Movistar Team	85h 02' 40"
2	Tom Dumoulin (NED)	Team Sunweb	+ 38"
3	Vincenzo Nibali (ITA)	Bahrain–Merida	+ 43"
4	Thibaut Pinot (FRA)	FDJ	+ 53"
5	Ilnur Zakarin (RUS)	Team Katusha–Alpecin	+ 1' 21"
6	Domenico Pozzovivo (ITA)	AG2R La Mondiale	+ 1' 30"
7	Bauke Mollema (NED)	Trek–Segafredo	+ 2' 48"
8	Adam Yates (GBR)	Orica–Scott	+ 6' 35"
9	Bob Jungels (LUX)	Quick-Step Floors	+ 7' 03"
10	Steven Kruijswijk (NED)	LottoNL–Jumbo	+ 7' 37"

== Stage 20 ==
27 May 2017 — Pordenone to Asiago, 190 km (118.1 mi)

Result of Stage 20
Rank	Rider	Team	Time
1	Thibaut Pinot (FRA)	FDJ	4h 57' 58"
2	Ilnur Zakarin (RUS)	Team Katusha–Alpecin	+ 0"
3	Vincenzo Nibali (ITA)	Bahrain–Merida	+ 0"
4	Domenico Pozzovivo (ITA)	AG2R La Mondiale	+ 0"
5	Nairo Quintana (COL)	Movistar Team	+ 0"
6	Bob Jungels (LUX)	Quick-Step Floors	+ 15"
7	Adam Yates (GBR)	Orica–Scott	+ 15"
8	Sébastien Reichenbach (SUI)	FDJ	+ 15"
9	Bauke Mollema (NED)	Trek–Segafredo	+ 15"
10	Tom Dumoulin (NED)	Team Sunweb	+ 15"

General classification after Stage 20
Rank	Rider	Team	Time
1	Nairo Quintana (COL)	Movistar Team	90h 00' 38"
2	Vincenzo Nibali (ITA)	Bahrain–Merida	+ 39"
3	Thibaut Pinot (FRA)	FDJ	+ 43"
4	Tom Dumoulin (NED)	Team Sunweb	+ 53"
5	Ilnur Zakarin (RUS)	Team Katusha–Alpecin	+ 1' 15"
6	Domenico Pozzovivo (ITA)	AG2R La Mondiale	+ 1' 30"
7	Bauke Mollema (NED)	Trek–Segafredo	+ 3' 03"
8	Adam Yates (GBR)	Orica–Scott	+ 6' 50"
9	Bob Jungels (LUX)	Quick-Step Floors	+ 7' 18"
10	Davide Formolo (ITA)	Cannondale–Drapac	+ 12' 55"

== Stage 21 ==
28 May 2017 — Monza (Autodromo) to Milan, 29.3 km (18.2 mi) individual time trial (ITT)

Result of Stage 21
Rank	Rider	Team	Time
1	Jos van Emden (NED)	LottoNL–Jumbo	33' 08"
2	Tom Dumoulin (NED)	Team Sunweb	+ 15"
3	Manuel Quinziato (ITA)	BMC Racing Team	+ 27"
4	Vasil Kiryienka (BLR)	Team Sky	+ 31"
5	Joey Rosskopf (USA)	BMC Racing Team	+ 35"
6	Jan Bárta (CZE)	Bora–Hansgrohe	+ 39"
7	Georg Preidler (AUT)	Team Sunweb	+ 51"
8	Bob Jungels (LUX)	Quick-Step Floors	+ 54"
9	Jan Tratnik (SLO)	CCC–Sprandi–Polkowice	+ 57"
10	Andrey Amador (CRC)	Movistar Team	+ 1' 02"

General classification after Stage 21
Rank	Rider	Team	Time
1	Tom Dumoulin (NED)	Team Sunweb	90h 34' 54"
2	Nairo Quintana (COL)	Movistar Team	+ 31"
3	Vincenzo Nibali (ITA)	Bahrain–Merida	+ 40"
4	Thibaut Pinot (FRA)	FDJ	+ 1' 17"
5	Ilnur Zakarin (RUS)	Team Katusha–Alpecin	+ 1' 56"
6	Domenico Pozzovivo (ITA)	AG2R La Mondiale	+ 3' 11"
7	Bauke Mollema (NED)	Trek–Segafredo	+ 3' 41"
8	Bob Jungels (LUX)	Quick-Step Floors	+ 7' 04"
9	Adam Yates (GBR)	Orica–Scott	+ 8' 10"
10	Davide Formolo (ITA)	Cannondale–Drapac	+ 15' 17"
