= 2016 Vuelta a Murcia =

Race details
- Dates: 13 February 2016
- Stages: 1
- Distance: 199.3 km (123.8 mi)
- Winning time: 5h 02' 19"

Results
	Winner	Philippe Gilbert (BEL)
	Second	Alejandro Valverde (ESP)
	Third	Ilnur Zakarin (RUS)

The 2016 Vuelta a Murcia was the 32nd professional edition of the Vuelta a Murcia cycle race and was held on 13 February 2016. The race started in San Javier and finished in Murcia. The race was won by Philippe Gilbert.

== General classification ==
Final general classification

Rank	Rider	Time
1	Philippe Gilbert (BEL)	5h 02' 19"
2	Alejandro Valverde (ESP)	+ 0"
3	Ilnur Zakarin (RUS)	+ 0"
4	Luis León Sánchez (ESP)	+ 0"
5	Ben Hermans (BEL)	+ 4"
6	Tanel Kangert (EST)	+ 15"
7	Tejay van Garderen (USA)	+ 18"
8	Dario Cataldo (ITA)	+ 1' 05"
9	Daniel Navarro (ESP)	+ 1' 06"
10	Víctor de la Parte (ESP)	+ 1' 09"
