= Rüdiger Selig =

German road cyclist (born 1989)

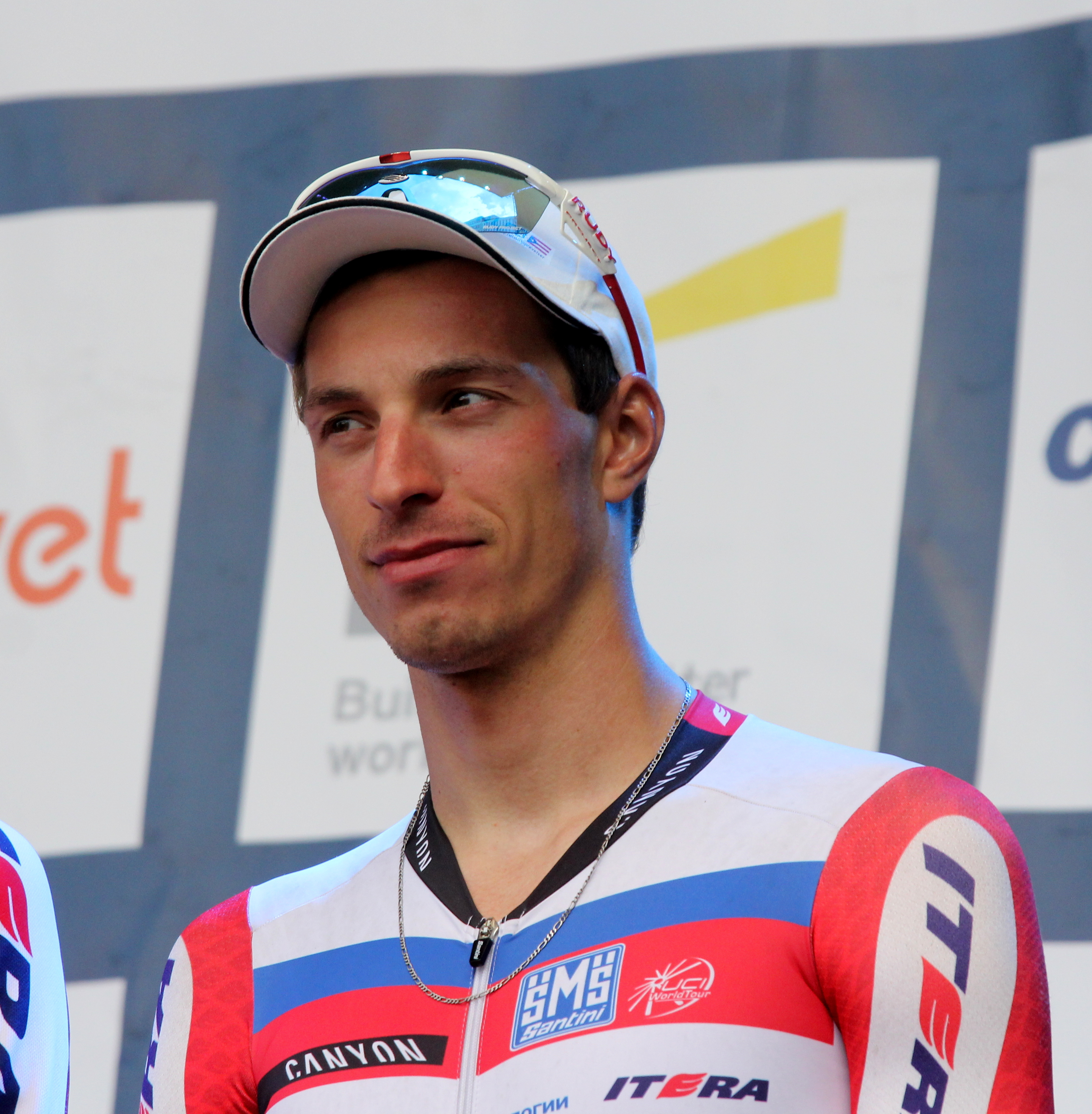
- Selig at the 2013 Tour des Fjords

Personal information
- Full name: Rüdiger Selig
- Nickname: Rudi
- Born: 19 February 1989 (age 37) Zwenkau, East Germany
- Height: 1.88 m (6 ft 2 in)
- Weight: 80 kg (176 lb)

Cycling career
- Sport: Cycling
- Current team: Retired
- Discipline: Road
- Role: Rider
- Rider type: Classics rider

Amateur teams
- 2008–2011: Team Jenatec
- 2011: Leopard Trek (stagiaire)

Professional teams
- 2012–2015: Team Katusha
- 2016–2021: Bora–Argon 18
- 2022–2023: Lotto–Soudal
- 2024: Astana Qazaqstan Team

Rüdiger Selig (born 19 February 1989) is a German former road racing cyclist, who competed as a professional from 2012 to 2024.

Born in Zwenkau, Selig competed as an amateur until the middle of 2011, when he joined Leopard Trek as a stagiaire. In October, he won the Binche–Tournai–Binche race. In September 2015 Bora–Argon 18 announced that Selig would join them for the 2016 season, in order to strengthen the team's sprint train. He was named in the start list for the 2016 Vuelta a España and the start list for the 2017 Giro d'Italia. In June 2017, he was named in the startlist for the 2017 Tour de France.

== Major results ==
2010
1st Stage 5 Tour de Berlin
3rd Overall Dookoła Mazowsza
2011 (1 pro win)
1st Binche–Tournai–Binche
1st Stage 5 Tour de Berlin
2nd Overall Dookoła Mazowsza
3rd Road race, National Under-23 Road Championships
4th Road race, UCI Under-23 Road World Championships
4th ProRace Berlin
5th Rund um den Finanzplatz Eschborn-Frankfurt U23
8th Overall Tour de Wallonie-Picarde
2012
2nd ProRace Berlin
6th Volta Limburg Classic
8th Münsterland Giro
2013 (1)
1st Volta Limburg Classic
1st Stage 3 (TTT) Tour des Fjords
7th ProRace Berlin
2015
1st Prologue (TTT) Tour of Austria
7th Down Under Classic
10th Clásica de Almería
2017
2nd Clásica de Almería
3rd Grand Prix de Fourmies
7th Nokere Koerse
2018 (1)
1st Stage 2 Okolo Slovenska
2019
6th Trofeo Palma
8th Gent–Wevelgem
10th Road race, UEC European Road Championships
2023
6th Bredene Koksijde Classic

=== Grand Tour general classification results timeline ===
Grand Tour	2016	2017	2018	2019	2020	2021	2022
Giro d'Italia	—	DNF	DNF	127	—	—	DNF
Tour de France	—	165	—	—	—	—	—
Vuelta a España	156	—	—	—	141	—	—

Legend
—	Did not compete
DNF	Did not finish
