= 2017 Giro d'Italia =

2017 UCI World Tour, race 21 of 37

Race details
- Dates: 5–28 May 2017
- Stages: 21
- Distance: 3,609.1 km (2,242.6 mi)
- Winning time: 90h 34' 54"

Results
Jersey awarded to the overall winner	Winner	Tom Dumoulin (NED)	(Team Sunweb)
	Second	Nairo Quintana (COL)	(Movistar Team)
	Third	Vincenzo Nibali (ITA)	(Bahrain–Merida)
Jersey awarded to the points classification winner	Points	Fernando Gaviria (COL)	(Quick-Step Floors)
Jersey awarded to the mountains classification winner	Mountains	Mikel Landa (ESP)	(Team Sky)
Jersey awarded to the young rider classification winner	Young rider	Bob Jungels (LUX)	(Quick-Step Floors)
	Team	(Spain) Movistar Team	

The 2017 Giro d'Italia was the 100th edition of the Giro d'Italia, one of cycling's Grand Tour races. The race started on 5 May in Alghero on the island of Sardinia, and ended on 28 May in Milan. The race was won by Tom Dumoulin, who became the first Dutch male winner of the Giro.

== Teams ==
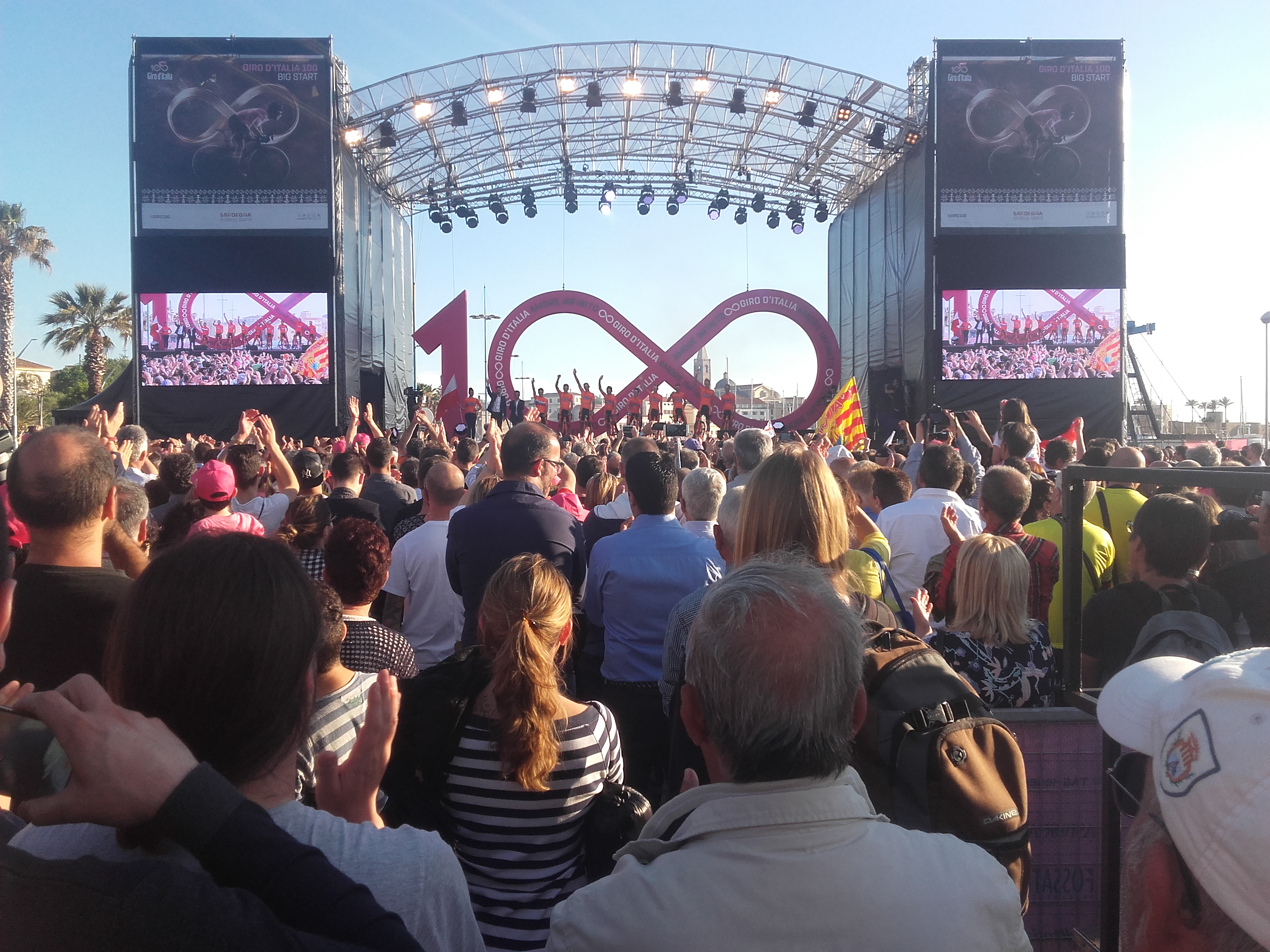
The team presentation took place in Alghero, Sardinia on 4 May.

All 18 UCI WorldTeams were automatically invited and were obliged to attend the race. Four wildcard UCI Professional Continental teams were also selected. Each team is expected to start with nine riders apart from Astana, with eight riders, due to the death of 2011 winner Michele Scarponi, who died while training days before the start of the race.

The teams entering the race were:

UCI WorldTeams

- AG2R La Mondiale
- Astana
- Bahrain–Merida
- BMC Racing Team
- Bora–Hansgrohe
- Cannondale–Drapac
- Team Dimension Data
- FDJ
- Team Katusha–Alpecin
- LottoNL–Jumbo
- Lotto–Soudal
- Movistar Team
- Orica–Scott
- Quick-Step Floors
- Team Sky
- Team Sunweb
- Trek–Segafredo
- UAE Team Emirates

UCI Professional Continental teams

- Bardiani–CSF
- CCC–Sprandi–Polkowice
- Gazprom–RusVelo
- Wilier Triestina–Selle Italia

== Pre-race favorites ==
The main pre-race favorites were Nairo Quintana (Movistar Team) and Vincenzo Nibali (Bahrain–Merida). Other general classification contenders were Geraint Thomas and Mikel Landa (Team Sky), Steven Kruijswijk (LottoNL–Jumbo), Thibaut Pinot (FDJ), Tom Dumoulin (Team Sunweb), Adam Yates (Orica–Scott), Bauke Mollema (Trek–Segafredo), Ilnur Zakarin (Team Katusha–Alpecin), Tejay van Garderen (BMC Racing Team), Bob Jungels (Quick-Step Floors) and Domenico Pozzovivo (AG2R La Mondiale).

Sprinters at the Giro include Fernando Gaviria, Caleb Ewan, André Greipel, Jasper Stuyven, Sacha Modolo, Giacomo Nizzolo, Sam Bennett and Ryan Gibbons.

== Route and stages ==
Details about the first three stages of the race were unveiled at a press conference on 14 September 2016. The remainder of the route was unveiled by race director Mauro Vegni on 25 October 2016. However, organizers RCS Sport leaked the route on their website the day before the official presentation.

There were 21 stages in the race, covering a total distance of 3,609.1 km (2,243 mi), 142 km (88.2 mi) longer than the 2016 Giro. The longest race stage was stage 12 at 229 km (142 mi), and stage 14 the shortest at 131 km (81 mi). The race featured a total of 69.1 km (43 mi) in individual time trials, and five summit finishes: stage 4, to Mount Etna; stage 9, to Blockhaus; stage 14, to Oropa; stage 18, to Ortisei/St. Ulrich; and stage 19, to Piancavallo. The Cima Coppi (the race's highest elevation) was the Stelvio Pass, summited during stage 16. The stages were categorised in four ways by race organisers; time trials, low, medium and high difficulty.

Stage characteristics and winners
Stage	Date	Course	Distance	Type	Winner
1	5 May	Alghero to Olbia	206 km (128 mi)	Low-difficulty stage	Lukas Pöstlberger (AUT)
2	6 May	Olbia to Tortolì	221 km (137 mi)	Medium-difficulty stage	André Greipel (GER)
3	7 May	Tortolì to Cagliari	148 km (92 mi)	Low-difficulty stage	Fernando Gaviria (COL)
	8 May	Rest day			
4	9 May	Cefalù to Etna (Rifugio Sapienza)	181 km (112 mi)	High-difficulty stage	Jan Polanc (SLO)
5	10 May	Pedara to Messina	159 km (99 mi)	Low-difficulty stage	Fernando Gaviria (COL)
6	11 May	Reggio Calabria to Terme Luigiane	217 km (135 mi)	Medium-difficulty stage	Silvan Dillier (SUI)
7	12 May	Castrovillari to Alberobello	224 km (139 mi)	Low-difficulty stage	Caleb Ewan (AUS)
8	13 May	Molfetta to Peschici	189 km (117 mi)	Medium-difficulty stage	Gorka Izagirre (ESP)
9	14 May	Montenero di Bisaccia to Blockhaus	149 km (93 mi)	Medium-difficulty stage	Nairo Quintana (COL)
	15 May	Rest day			
10	16 May	Foligno to Montefalco	39.8 km (25 mi)	Individual time trial	Tom Dumoulin (NED)
11	17 May	Florence (Ponte a Ema) to Bagno di Romagna	161 km (100 mi)	Medium-difficulty stage	Omar Fraile (ESP)
12	18 May	Forlì to Reggio Emilia	229 km (142 mi)	Low-difficulty stage	Fernando Gaviria (COL)
13	19 May	Reggio Emilia to Tortona	167 km (104 mi)	Low-difficulty stage	Fernando Gaviria (COL)
14	20 May	Castellania to Santuario di Oropa	131 km (81 mi)	Medium-difficulty stage	Tom Dumoulin (NED)
15	21 May	Valdengo to Bergamo	199 km (124 mi)	Medium-difficulty stage	Bob Jungels (LUX)
	22 May	Rest day			
16	23 May	Rovetta to Bormio	222 km (138 mi)	High-difficulty stage	Vincenzo Nibali (ITA)
17	24 May	Tirano to Canazei	219 km (136 mi)	Medium-difficulty stage	Pierre Rolland (FRA)
18	25 May	Moena to Ortisei/St. Ulrich	137 km (85 mi)	High-difficulty stage	Tejay van Garderen (USA)
19	26 May	Innichen/San Candido to Piancavallo	191 km (119 mi)	High-difficulty stage	Mikel Landa (ESP)
20	27 May	Pordenone to Asiago	190 km (118 mi)	High-difficulty stage	Thibaut Pinot (FRA)
21	28 May	Monza (Autodromo) to Milan	29.3 km (18 mi)	Individual time trial	Jos van Emden (NED)

== Race overview ==
Lukas Pöstlberger won the first stage, André Greipel claimed the second and Fernando Gaviria the third. From there Bob Jungels would wear the Pink jersey as Gaviria went on to win three more stages and lock up the points classification. As the race entered the mountains the leader's jersey swapped between Nairo Quintana and Tom Dumoulin going into the penultimate time trial where Quintana was in 1st and Dumoulin in 4th. Domenico Pozzovivo, Ilnur Zakarin, Vincenzo Nibali and Thibaut Pinot, who had just won the final mountain stage, were all within 90 seconds of Quintana. During the final time trial Dumoulin finished 2nd to fellow Dutchman Jos van Emden, but beat all of the GC contenders handily claiming the Giro victory thirty seconds ahead of Quintana as Nibali finalized the podium. This was the first grand tour victory by a Dutch rider in nearly four decades.

=== Doping ===
On the eve of the Giro d'Italia, the UCI announced that two Bardiani–CSF riders, Stefano Pirazzi and Nicola Ruffoni, had tested positive for GH-Releasing Peptides (GHRPs) – defined as peptide hormones, growth factors, or mimetics – in samples collected during out-of-competition doping tests conducted on 25 and 26 April 2017. With the team incurring first and second AAFs within a twelve-month period, the UCI aimed to enforce article 7.12.1 of the UCI Anti-Doping Rules, allowing for suspension of the team from 15 to 45 days – casting doubt on their Giro appearance.

== Classification leadership ==
In the Giro d'Italia, four different jerseys are awarded:

- The first and most important is the general classification, calculated by adding each rider's finishing times on each stage. Riders receive time bonuses (10, 6 and 4 seconds respectively) for finishing in the first three places on each stage, excluding the two individual time trial stages. The rider with the lowest cumulative time is awarded the pink jersey (Italian: maglia rosa), and is considered the winner of the Giro d'Italia.

Points for the points classification
Position	1	2	3	4	5	6	7	8	9	10	11	12	13	14	15
Stages 1–3, 5–7, 12–13	50	35	25	18	14	12	10	8	7	6	5	4	3	2	1
Stages 8, 14–15, 17	25	18	12	8	6	5	4	3	2	1	0				
Other stages	15	12	9	7	6	5	4	3	2	1	0				

- Additionally, there is a points classification. Riders win points for finishing in the top placings on each stage, except the time trials. Flat stages award more points than mountainous stages, meaning that this classification tends to favour sprinters. In addition, points can be won in intermediate sprints. The leader of the points classification wore the cyclamen jersey, awarded for the first time since 2009.

Points for the mountains classification
Position	1	2	3	4	5	6	7	8	9
Points for Cima Coppi	45	30	20	14	10	6	4	2	1
Points for Category 1	35	18	12	9	6	4	2	1	0
Points for Category 2	15	8	6	4	2	1	0		
Points for Category 3	7	4	2	1	0				
Points for Category 4	3	2	1	0					

- There is also a mountains classification, for which points were awarded for reaching the top of a climb before other riders. Each climb was categorised as either first, second, third or fourth-category, with more points available for the more difficult, higher-categorised climbs. For first-category climbs, the top eight riders earned points; on second-category climbs, six riders won points; on third-category climbs, only the top four riders earned points with three on fourth-category climbs. The leadership of the mountains classification was marked by a blue jersey. The Cima Coppi, the race's highest point of elevation, awards more points than the other first-category climbs, with nine riders scoring points. At 2,757 metres (9,045 ft), the Cima Coppi for the 2017 Giro d'Italia is the Stelvio Pass.
- The fourth jersey represents the young rider classification. This is decided the same way as the general classification, but only riders born after 1 January 1992 are eligible. The winner of the classification is awarded a white jersey.
- There are also two classifications for teams. In the Trofeo Fast Team classification, the times of the best three cyclists per team on each stage are added up; the leading team is one with the lowest total time. The Trofeo Super Team is a team points classification, with the top 20 riders of each stage earning points for their team.

Several other minor classifications are awarded:

- The first is the intermediate sprint classification. Each road stage has two sprints – the Traguardi Volanti. The first riders across the intermediate sprint lines are awarded points; the rider with the most points at the end of the race wins the classification. This classification was won by Daniel Teklehaimanot (Team Dimension Data).
- Another classification – the combativity prize (Italian: Premio Combattività) – involves points awarded to the first riders at the stage finishes, at intermediate sprints, and at the summits of categorised climbs. This classification was won by Mikel Landa (Team Sky).
- There is also a breakaway award (Italian: Premio della Fuga). For this, points are awarded to each rider in any breakaway smaller than 10 riders that escapes for at least 5 kilometres (3.1 mi). Each rider is awarded a point for each kilometre that the rider was away from the peloton. The rider with the most points at the end of the Giro wins the award. This classification was won by Pavel Brutt (Gazprom–RusVelo).
- The final classification is a "fair play" ranking for each team. Teams are given penalty points for infringing various rules. These range from half-point penalties, for offences that merit warnings from race officials, to a 2000-point penalty, for a positive doping test. The team that has the lowest points total at the end of the Giro wins the classification. The winner was Bora–Hansgrohe, with 20 penalty points to their name.

Classification leadership by stage
Stage	Winner	General classification	Points classification	Mountains classification	Young rider classification	Trofeo Fast Team	Trofeo Super Team
1	Lukas Pöstlberger	Lukas Pöstlberger	Lukas Pöstlberger (Note: In stage 2, Caleb Ewan, who was second in the points and young rider classifications, wore the cyclamen points jersey, because Lukas Pöstlberger (in first place) wore the pink jersey as leader of the general classification during that stage. Jasper Stuyven, who was third in the young rider classification, wore the white jersey as a result of this.)	Cesare Benedetti	Lukas Pöstlberger	Bora–Hansgrohe	Bora–Hansgrohe
2	André Greipel	André Greipel	André Greipel (Note: In stage 3, Caleb Ewan, who was fourth in the points classification, wore the cyclamen jersey, because André Greipel (in first place) wore the pink jersey as leader of the general classification, Daniel Teklehaimanot (in second place) wore the blue jersey as leader of the mountains classification, and Lukas Pöstlberger (in third place) wore the white jersey as leader of the young rider classification during that stage.)	Daniel Teklehaimanot	Lukas Pöstlberger	Orica–Scott	Lotto–Soudal
3	Fernando Gaviria	Fernando Gaviria	André Greipel	Daniel Teklehaimanot	Fernando Gaviria (Note: In stage 4, Lukas Pöstlberger, who was second in the young rider classification, wore the white jersey, because Fernando Gaviria (in first place) wore the pink jersey as leader of the general classification during that stage.)	Quick-Step Floors	Team Dimension Data
4	Jan Polanc	Bob Jungels	André Greipel	Jan Polanc	Bob Jungels (Note: In stages 5 to 9, Adam Yates, who was second in the young rider classification, wore the white jersey, because Bob Jungels (in first place) wore the pink jersey as leader of the general classification during that stage.)	Cannondale–Drapac	UAE Team Emirates
5	Fernando Gaviria	Bob Jungels	Fernando Gaviria	Jan Polanc	Bob Jungels	Cannondale–Drapac	Quick-Step Floors
6	Silvan Dillier	Bob Jungels	Fernando Gaviria	Jan Polanc	Bob Jungels	Cannondale–Drapac	Quick-Step Floors
7	Caleb Ewan	Bob Jungels	Fernando Gaviria	Jan Polanc	Bob Jungels	UAE Team Emirates	Quick-Step Floors
8	Gorka Izagirre	Bob Jungels	Fernando Gaviria	Jan Polanc	Bob Jungels	UAE Team Emirates	Quick-Step Floors
9	Nairo Quintana	Nairo Quintana	Fernando Gaviria	Jan Polanc	Davide Formolo	Movistar Team	Quick-Step Floors
10	Tom Dumoulin	Tom Dumoulin	Fernando Gaviria	Jan Polanc	Bob Jungels	Movistar Team	Quick-Step Floors
11	Omar Fraile	Tom Dumoulin	Fernando Gaviria	Jan Polanc	Bob Jungels	Movistar Team	Quick-Step Floors
12	Fernando Gaviria	Tom Dumoulin	Fernando Gaviria	Omar Fraile	Bob Jungels	Movistar Team	Quick-Step Floors
13	Fernando Gaviria	Tom Dumoulin	Fernando Gaviria	Omar Fraile	Bob Jungels	Movistar Team	Quick-Step Floors
14	Tom Dumoulin	Tom Dumoulin	Fernando Gaviria	Tom Dumoulin (Note: In stages 15 and 16, Omar Fraile, who was second in the mountains classification, wore the blue jersey, because Tom Dumoulin (in first place) wore the pink jersey as leader of the general classification during that stage.)	Bob Jungels	Movistar Team	Quick-Step Floors
15	Bob Jungels	Tom Dumoulin	Fernando Gaviria	Tom Dumoulin	Bob Jungels	Movistar Team	Quick-Step Floors
16	Vincenzo Nibali	Tom Dumoulin	Fernando Gaviria	Mikel Landa	Bob Jungels	Movistar Team	Quick-Step Floors
17	Pierre Rolland	Tom Dumoulin	Fernando Gaviria	Mikel Landa	Bob Jungels	Movistar Team	Quick-Step Floors
18	Tejay van Garderen	Tom Dumoulin	Fernando Gaviria	Mikel Landa	Adam Yates	Movistar Team	Quick-Step Floors
19	Mikel Landa	Nairo Quintana	Fernando Gaviria	Mikel Landa	Adam Yates	Movistar Team	Quick-Step Floors
20	Thibaut Pinot	Nairo Quintana	Fernando Gaviria	Mikel Landa	Adam Yates	Movistar Team	Quick-Step Floors
21	Jos van Emden	Tom Dumoulin	Fernando Gaviria	Mikel Landa	Bob Jungels	Movistar Team	Quick-Step Floors
Final		Tom Dumoulin	Fernando Gaviria	Mikel Landa	Bob Jungels	Movistar Team	Quick-Step Floors

== Final standings ==
Legend
General classification	Denotes the leader of the general classification	Mountains classification	Denotes the leader of the mountains classification
Points classification	Denotes the leader of the points classification	Young rider classification	Denotes the leader of the young rider classification

=== General classification ===
General classification (1–10)
Rank	Rider	Team	Time
1	Tom Dumoulin (NED)	Team Sunweb	90h 34' 54"
2	Nairo Quintana (COL)	Movistar Team	+ 31"
3	Vincenzo Nibali (ITA)	Bahrain–Merida	+ 40"
4	Thibaut Pinot (FRA)	FDJ	+ 1' 17"
5	Ilnur Zakarin (RUS)	Team Katusha–Alpecin	+ 1' 56"
6	Domenico Pozzovivo (ITA)	AG2R La Mondiale	+ 3' 11"
7	Bauke Mollema (NED)	Trek–Segafredo	+ 3' 41"
8	Bob Jungels (LUX)	Quick-Step Floors	+ 7' 04"
9	Adam Yates (GBR)	Orica–Scott	+ 8' 10"
10	Davide Formolo (ITA)	Cannondale–Drapac	+ 15' 57"

=== Points classification ===
Points classification (1–10)
Rank	Rider	Team	Points
1	Fernando Gaviria (COL)	Quick-Step Floors	325
2	Jasper Stuyven (BEL)	Trek–Segafredo	192
3	Sam Bennett (IRL)	Bora–Hansgrohe	117
4	Daniel Teklehaimanot (ERI)	Team Dimension Data	100
5	Lukas Pöstlberger (AUT)	Bora–Hansgrohe	98
6	Tom Dumoulin (NED)	Team Sunweb	80
7	Pavel Brutt (RUS)	Gazprom–RusVelo	76
8	Kristian Sbaragli (ITA)	Team Dimension Data	76
9	Eugert Zhupa (ALB)	Wilier Triestina–Selle Italia	70
10	Roberto Ferrari (ITA)	UAE Team Emirates	70

=== Mountains classification ===
Mountains classification (1–10)
Rank	Rider	Team	Points
1	Mikel Landa (ESP)	Team Sky	224
2	Luis León Sánchez (ESP)	Astana	118
3	Omar Fraile (ESP)	Team Dimension Data	104
4	Nairo Quintana (COL)	Movistar Team	70
5	Pierre Rolland (FRA)	Cannondale–Drapac	70
6	Ilnur Zakarin (RUS)	Team Katusha–Alpecin	66
7	Igor Antón (ESP)	Team Dimension Data	56
8	Tom Dumoulin (NED)	Team Sunweb	55
9	Domenico Pozzovivo (ITA)	AG2R La Mondiale	54
10	Thibaut Pinot (FRA)	FDJ	53

=== Young rider classification ===
Young rider classification (1–10)
Rank	Rider	Team	Time
1	Bob Jungels (LUX)	Quick-Step Floors	90h 41' 58"
2	Adam Yates (GBR)	Orica–Scott	+ 1' 06"
3	Davide Formolo (ITA)	Cannondale–Drapac	+ 8' 13"
4	Jan Polanc (SLO)	UAE Team Emirates	+ 11' 02"
5	Laurens De Plus (BEL)	Quick-Step Floors	+ 1h 12' 56"
6	Simone Petilli (ITA)	UAE Team Emirates	+ 1h 22' 30"
7	Sebastián Henao (COL)	Team Sky	+ 1h 37' 00"
8	François Bidard (FRA)	AG2R La Mondiale	+ 2h 01' 59"
9	Alexander Foliforov (RUS)	Gazprom–RusVelo	+ 2h 02' 26"
10	Gregor Mühlberger (AUT)	Bora–Hansgrohe	+ 2h 05' 30"

=== Trofeo Fast Team ===
Trofeo Fast Team classification (1–10)
Rank	Team	Time
1	(Spain) Movistar Team	270h 36' 48"
2	(France) AG2R La Mondiale	+ 59' 46"
3	(France) FDJ	+ 1h 19' 56"
4	Bahrain–Merida	+ 1h 24' 52"
5	(United States) Cannondale–Drapac	+ 1h 27' 19"
6	(United Arab Emirates) UAE Team Emirates	+ 1h 59' 31"
7	(United Kingdom) Team Sky	+ 1h 59' 41"
8	(Kazakhstan) Astana	+ 2h 09' 05"
9	(United States) Trek–Segafredo	+ 2h 23' 12"
10	(Germany) Team Sunweb	+ 2h 41' 45"

=== Trofeo Super Team ===
Trofeo Super Team classification (1–10)
Rank	Team	Points
1	(Belgium) Quick-Step Floors	516
2	(United Arab Emirates) UAE Team Emirates	355
3	(United Kingdom) Team Sky	323
4	(Germany) Bora–Hansgrohe	308
5	(Spain) Movistar Team	297
6	(South Africa) Team Dimension Data	289
7	(Germany) Team Sunweb	286
8	(United States) Trek–Segafredo	277
9	(France) FDJ	240
10	Bahrain–Merida	239
