= Ryan Gibbons (cyclist) =

South African cyclist (born 1994)

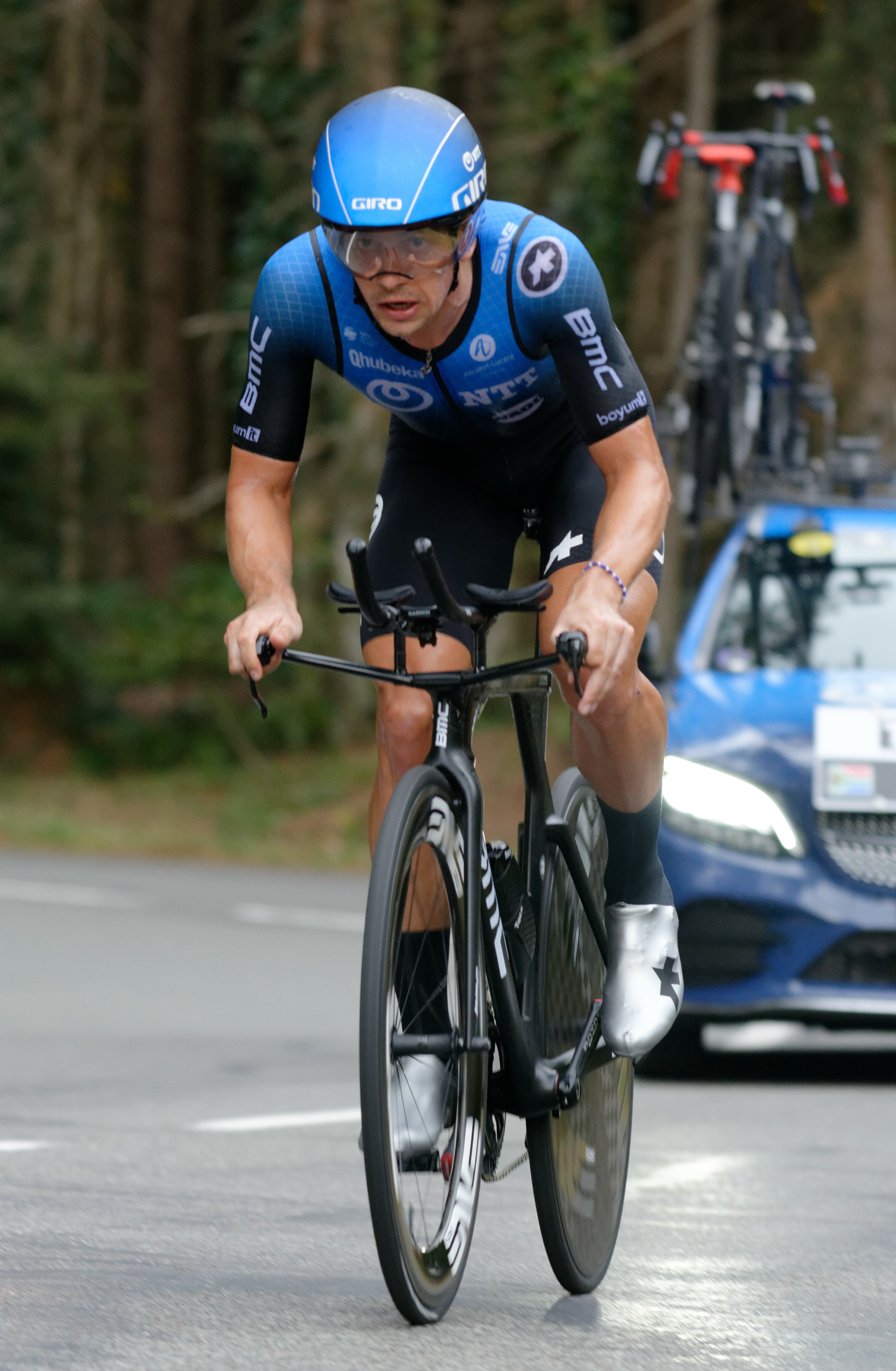
- Gibbons at the 2020 Tour de France

Personal information
- Full name: Ryan Gibbons
- Born: 13 August 1994 (age 32) Johannesburg, South Africa
- Height: 1.81 m (5 ft 11 in)
- Weight: 70 kg (154 lb)

Cycling career
- Sport: Cycling
- Current team: Lidl–Trek
- Disciplines: Road; Mountain biking (former)
- Role: Rider
- Rider type: Sprinter

Amateur teams
- 2013: MTN–Qhubeka WCC
- 2014–2015: Team Europcar SA
- 2016: Team Dimension Data (stagiaire)

Professional teams
- 2016: Dimension Data for Qhubeka
- 2017–2020: Team Dimension Data
- 2021–2023: UAE Team Emirates
- 2024–: Lidl–Trek

Major wins
- Stage races Tour de Langkawi (2017) Single-day races and Classics African Road Championships (2021) African Time Trial Championships (2021) National Road Race Championships (2020, 2024) National Time Trial Championships (2021, 2024)
Medal record
Men's road cycling
Representing South Africa
African Road Championships
Gold medal – first place	2021 Cairo	Road race
Gold medal – first place	2021 Cairo	Time trial
Gold medal – first place	2021 Cairo	Team time trial
Gold medal – first place	2021 Cairo	Mixed relay

Ryan Gibbons (born 13 August 1994) is a South African cyclist, who currently rides for UCI WorldTeam Lidl–Trek.

== Career ==
Prior to starting his road racing career at junior level, Johannesburg-born Gibbons competed in mountain bike racing. He was named in the start list for the 2017 Giro d'Italia. Gibbons won the first stage of the first-ever Virtual Tour de France on 4 July 2020. The following month, he was named in the startlist for the Tour de France.

In October 2020, Gibbons signed a two-year contract with UAE Team Emirates, from the 2021 season.

He qualified to represent South Africa at the 2020 Summer Olympics.

== Major results ==
2013
3rd Team time trial, African Road Championships
2015
KZN Autumn Series

4th Mayday Classic
4th Hibiscus Cycle Classic
7th PMB Road Classic

6th 94.7 Cycle Challenge
2016
4th Time trial, National Road Championships
7th Coppa Bernocchi
2017 (2 pro wins)
1st Overall Tour de Langkawi

1st Points classification
1st Stage 5

4th Road race, National Road Championships
2018
2nd Time trial, National Road Championships
2019 (1)
African Games

1st Time trial
1st Team time trial
2nd Road race

2nd Road race, National Road Championships
African Road Championships

3rd Time trial
4th Road race

4th Cadel Evans Great Ocean Road Race
2020 (1)
1st Road race, National Road Championships
2021 (4)
African Road Championships

1st Road race
1st Time trial
1st Team time trial
1st Mixed team relay

1st Time trial, National Road Championships
1st Trofeo Calvia
5th Vuelta a Murcia
Combativity award Stage 20 Vuelta a España
2022
2nd Trofeo Alcúdia – Port d'Alcúdia
2024 (2)
National Road Championships

1st Road race
1st Time trial

=== Grand Tour general classification results timeline ===
Grand Tour	2017	2018	2019	2020	2021	2022	2023	2024
Giro d'Italia	DNF	84	91	—	—	—	68	—
Tour de France	—	—	—	121	—	—	—	87
Vuelta a España	—	82	—	—	36	—	—	—

Legend
—	Did not compete
DNF	Did not finish
