= Davide Formolo =

Italian cyclist (born 1992)

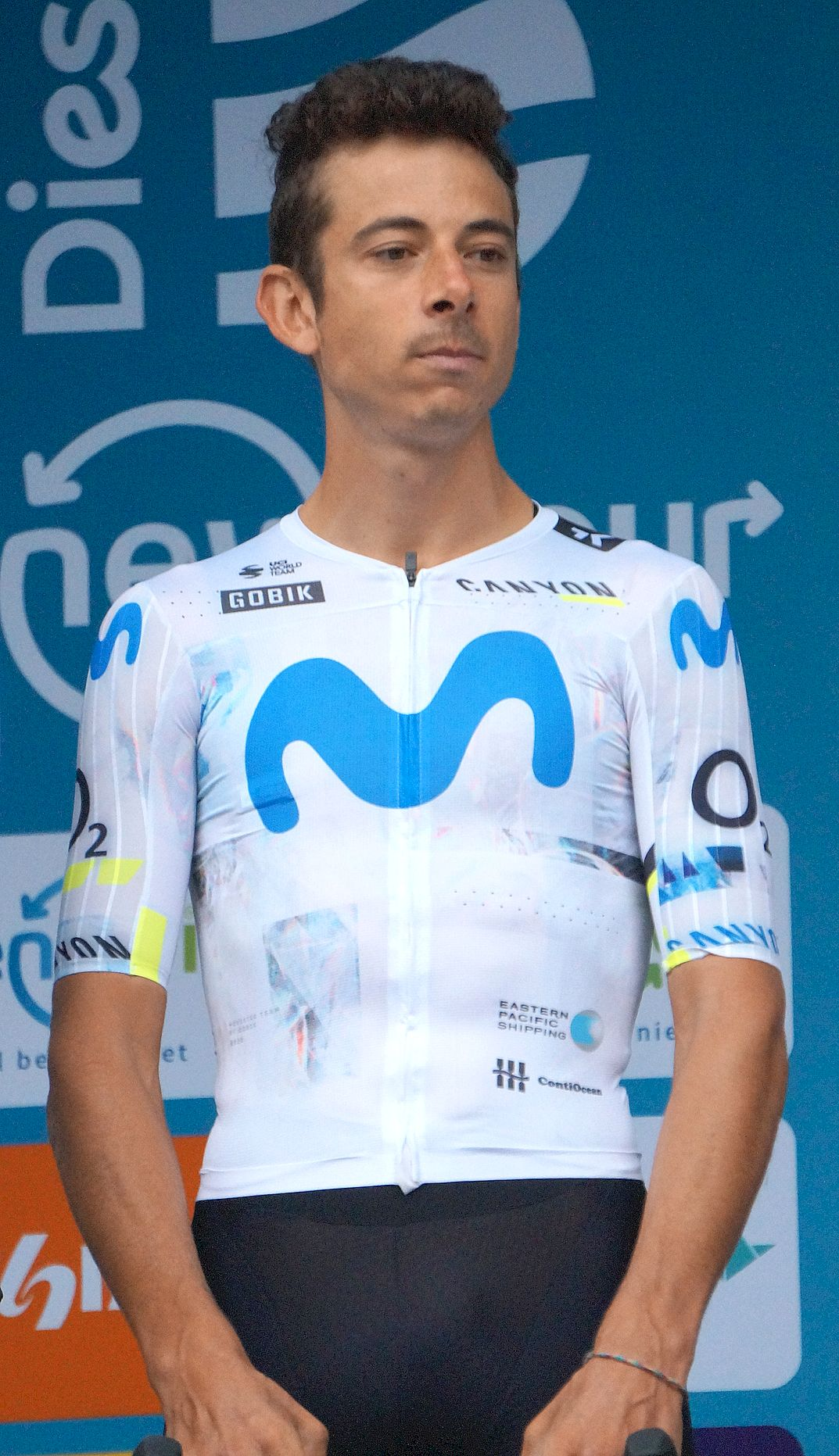
- Formolo in 2026

Personal information
- Full name: Davide Formolo
- Nicknames: Roccia; English: Rock
- Born: 25 October 1992 (age 34) Negrar, Italy
- Height: 1.81 m (5 ft 11 in)
- Weight: 62 kg (137 lb; 9.8 st)

Cycling career
- Sport: Cycling
- Current team: Movistar Team
- Discipline: Road
- Role: Rider
- Rider type: Climber

Amateur team
- 2011–2013: Petroli–Firenze

Professional teams
- 2014: Cannondale
- 2015–2017: Cannondale–Garmin
- 2018–2019: Bora–Hansgrohe
- 2020–2023: UAE Team Emirates
- 2024–: Movistar Team

Major wins
- Grand Tours Giro d'Italia 1 individual stage (2015) One-day races and Classics National Road Race Championships (2019) Veneto Classic (2023)

Davide Formolo (born 25 October 1992) is an Italian professional road racing cyclist, who currently rides for UCI WorldTeam Movistar Team. Formolo turned professional in 2014.

== Biography ==
Born on 25 October 1992, in Negrar, Italy, Formolo resides in Marano di Valpolicella, Veneto, Italy.

He signed with Cannondale, a UCI ProTeam, for the 2014 season.

Formolo signed with Cannondale–Garmin, a UCI WorldTeam, for the 2015 season.

On 12 May 2015, at the Giro d'Italia, Formolo escaped with twenty riders, and successfully soloed, 14 kilometres (8.7 miles), to the finish. He finished twenty-two seconds ahead of the peloton. He was named in the startlist for the 2016 Vuelta a España.

After two seasons with Bora–Hansgrohe, it was announced that Formolo would join UAE Team Emirates on a two-year contract from 2020. In August 2020, he was named in the startlist for the 2020 Tour de France. He withdrew from the race following stage 10, after he was diagnosed with a fractured collarbone following a crash.

== Major results ==
2012
2nd Road race, National Under-23 Road Championships
2nd Gran Premio Palio del Recioto
4th Overall Giro della Valle d'Aosta
8th Overall Girobio
2013
2nd Overall Giro della Valle d'Aosta
2nd Trofeo Matteotti Under-23
3rd Coppa della Pace
4th Road race, National Under-23 Road Championships
6th Overall Tour de l'Avenir
6th GP Capodarco
8th Gran Premio Palio del Recioto
9th Trofeo Edil C
10th Gran Premio di Poggiana
2014
2nd Road race, National Road Championships
2nd GP Industria & Artigianato di Larciano
4th Overall Tour of Turkey
6th Giro dell'Emilia
7th Overall Tour de Taiwan
7th Overall Tour de Suisse
7th Japan Cup
9th Gran Premio di Lugano
2015 (1 pro win)
1st Stage 4 Giro d'Italia
1st Young rider classification, Volta ao Algarve
3rd Trofeo Andratx-Mirador d'Es Colomer
9th Overall Tour de Pologne
9th Overall Tour of Alberta
2016
4th Overall Tour de Pologne
9th Overall Vuelta a España
2017
10th Overall Giro d'Italia
2018
6th Overall Abu Dhabi Tour
7th Overall Tirreno–Adriatico
7th Liège–Bastogne–Liège
8th Overall Tour de Pologne
10th Overall Giro d'Italia
2019 (2)
1st Road race, National Road Championships
1st Stage 7 Volta a Catalunya
2nd Liège–Bastogne–Liège
2nd Tokyo 2020 Test Event
7th Overall Tour de Pologne
2020 (1)
1st Stage 3 Critérium du Dauphiné
2nd Strade Bianche
8th Overall UAE Tour
2021
2nd Tre Valli Varesine
10th Overall Tour de Luxembourg
2022
2nd Veneto Classic
4th Coppa Agostoni
9th Giro dell'Emilia
10th Overall Deutschland Tour
2023 (2)
1st Veneto Classic
1st Coppa Agostoni
2nd Overall Saudi Tour
5th Memorial Marco Pantani
6th Giro della Toscana
9th Overall Tour of Austria
9th Strade Bianche
2024
5th Road race, National Road Championships
6th Overall AlUla Tour
7th Strade Bianche
2025
7th Gran Premio Castellón
7th Prueba Villafranca de Ordizia
8th Clásica Terres de l'Ebre
10th Giro della Toscana

=== Grand Tour general classification results timeline ===
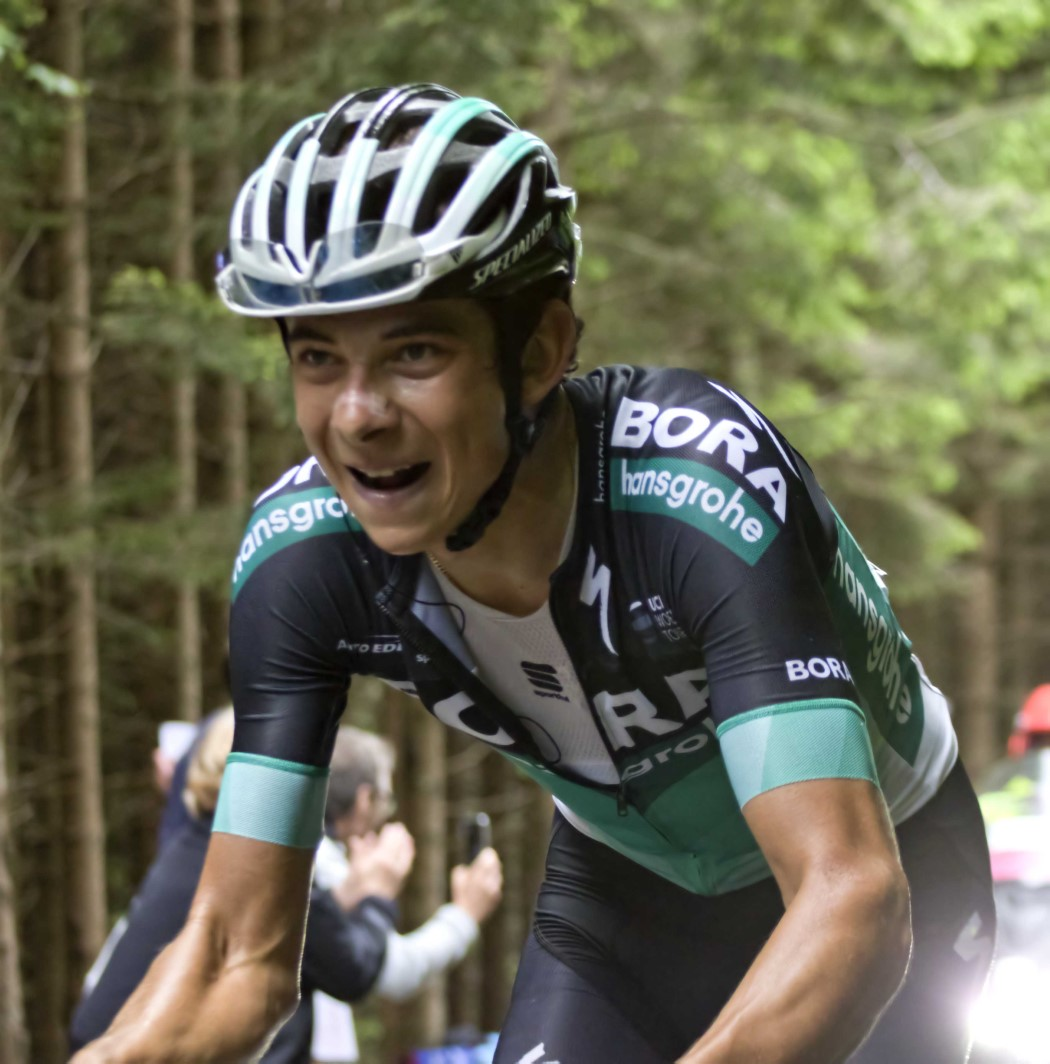
Formolo at the 2018 Giro d'Italia, where he finished tenth overall for the second year in succession.

Grand Tour	2015	2016	2017	2018	2019	2020	2021	2022	2023	2024	2025
Giro d'Italia	31	31	10	10	15	—	15	36	30	—	45
Tour de France	—	—	—	—	—	DNF	44	—	—	72	
Vuelta a España	—	9	—	22	DNF	DNF	—	—	—	—	

Legend
—	Did not compete
DNF	Did not finish
IP	In progress
