= Ilnur Zakarin =

Russian cyclist (born 1989)

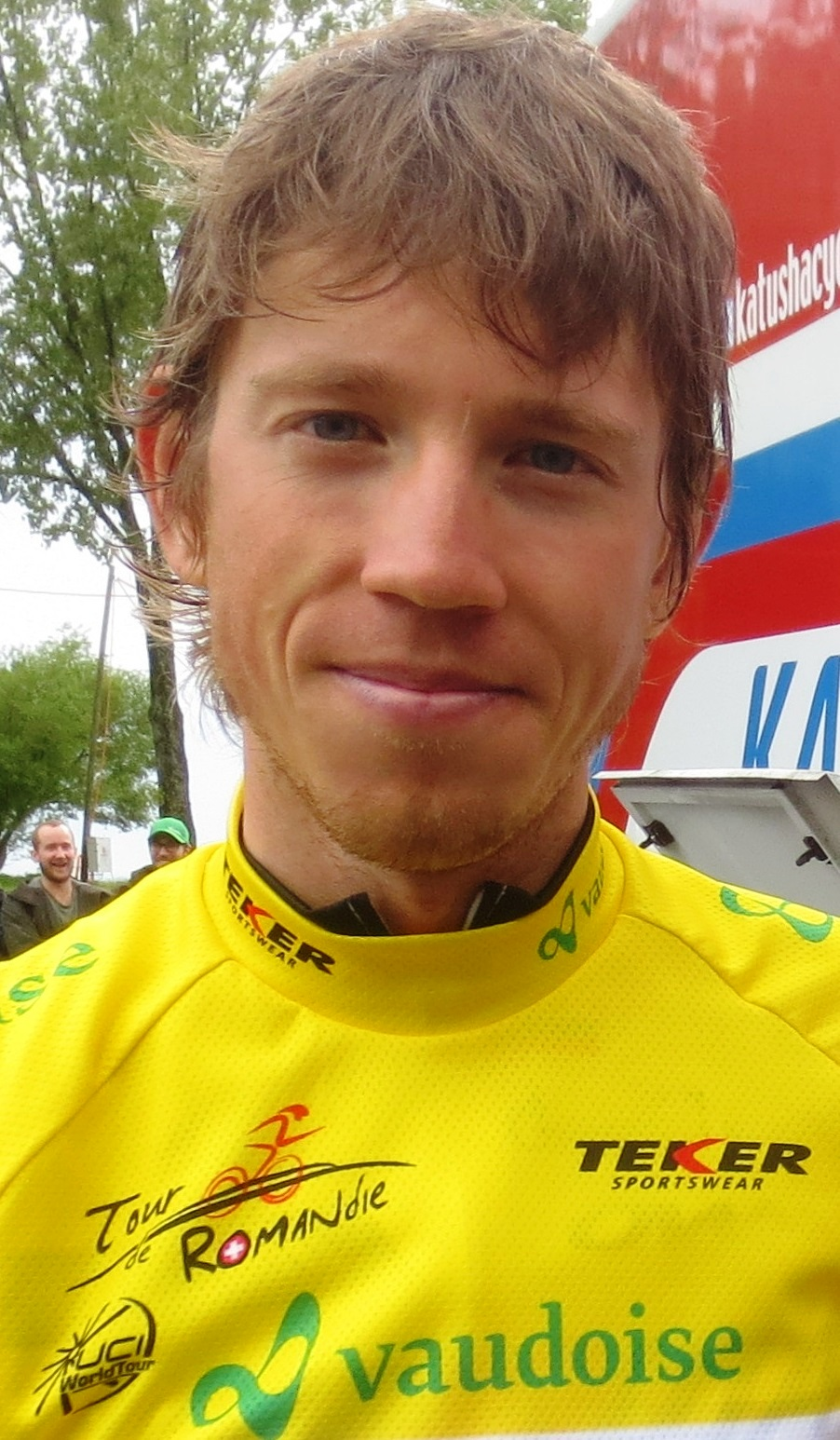
- Zakarin at the 2015 Tour de Romandie

Personal information
- Full name: Ilnur Azatovich Zakarin
- Born: 15 September 1989 (age 37): Naberezhnye Chelny, Russian SFSR, Soviet Union; (now Russia)
- Height: 1.87 m (6 ft 2 in)
- Weight: 67 kg (148 lb)

Cycling career
- Sport: Cycling
- Current team: Retired
- Discipline: Road
- Role: Rider
- Rider type: Climber

Professional teams
- 2012: Itera–Katusha
- 2013–2014: RusVelo
- 2015–2019: Team Katusha
- 2020: CCC Team
- 2021–2022: Gazprom–RusVelo

Major wins
- Grand Tours Tour de France 1 individual stage (2016) Giro d'Italia 2 individual stages (2015, 2019) Stage races Tour de Romandie (2015) One-day races and Classics National Time Trial Championships (2013, 2017)

Ilnur Azatovich Zakarin (Russian: Ильнур Азатович Закарин; born 15 September 1989) is a Russian former racing cyclist, who competed as a professional from 2012 to 2022.

== Career ==
=== Early career and doping ban ===
In 2007, as a 17-year-old, he won the juniors time trial at the European Road Championships.

In July 2009, the Russian cycling federation announced that Zakarin had been banned for two years after he had tested positive for the anabolic steroid metandienone.

He came back from his ban in 2011 and in 2012 he got a contract with continental team Itera–Katusha. In the fall of 2012 he rode as a stagiaire with Team Katusha, but he was not picked up by the team and instead he got a contract with professional continental team RusVelo, whom he rode for in 2013 and 2014.

=== Team Katusha (2015–19) ===
In September 2014 Team Katusha announced that they had signed Zakarin on an initial two-year deal from 2015.

==== 2015 season ====
In April, he finished ninth overall at the Tour of the Basque Country. At the beginning of May, Zakarin took a prestigious victory; the general classification of the Tour de Romandie. He realized this feat thanks to a good performance in the mountains, finishing second in stage 4, and a very good time trial ride on the fifth and final stage, where he finished second even though he had to change his bike midway through the course due to some mechanical issues. Zakarin made his Grand Tour debut at the Giro d'Italia, where he won Stage 11 after attacking from a breakaway in heavy rain at the Autodromo Internazionale Enzo e Dino Ferrari racing circuit in Imola.

==== 2016 season ====
In 2016, Zakarin won Stage 6 of Paris–Nice atop La Madone d'Utelle, ahead of Geraint Thomas (Team Sky) and Alberto Contador (Tinkoff). He finished the race in fourth overall. Zakarin led Katusha at the Giro d'Italia. On Stage 19, whilst placed fifth overall, he crashed heavily on the descent of the Colle dell'Agnello, suffering fractures to his left collarbone and shoulder, ending his race. Zakarin recovered from his injuries and was named in the start list for the Tour de France. Zakarin won Stage 17 of the race after bridging up to Rafał Majka (Tinkoff) and Jarlinson Pantano (IAM Cycling) at the base of the day's final climb to Finhaut–Emosson, and attacking with six kilometres remaining to solo to stage victory.

==== 2017 season ====
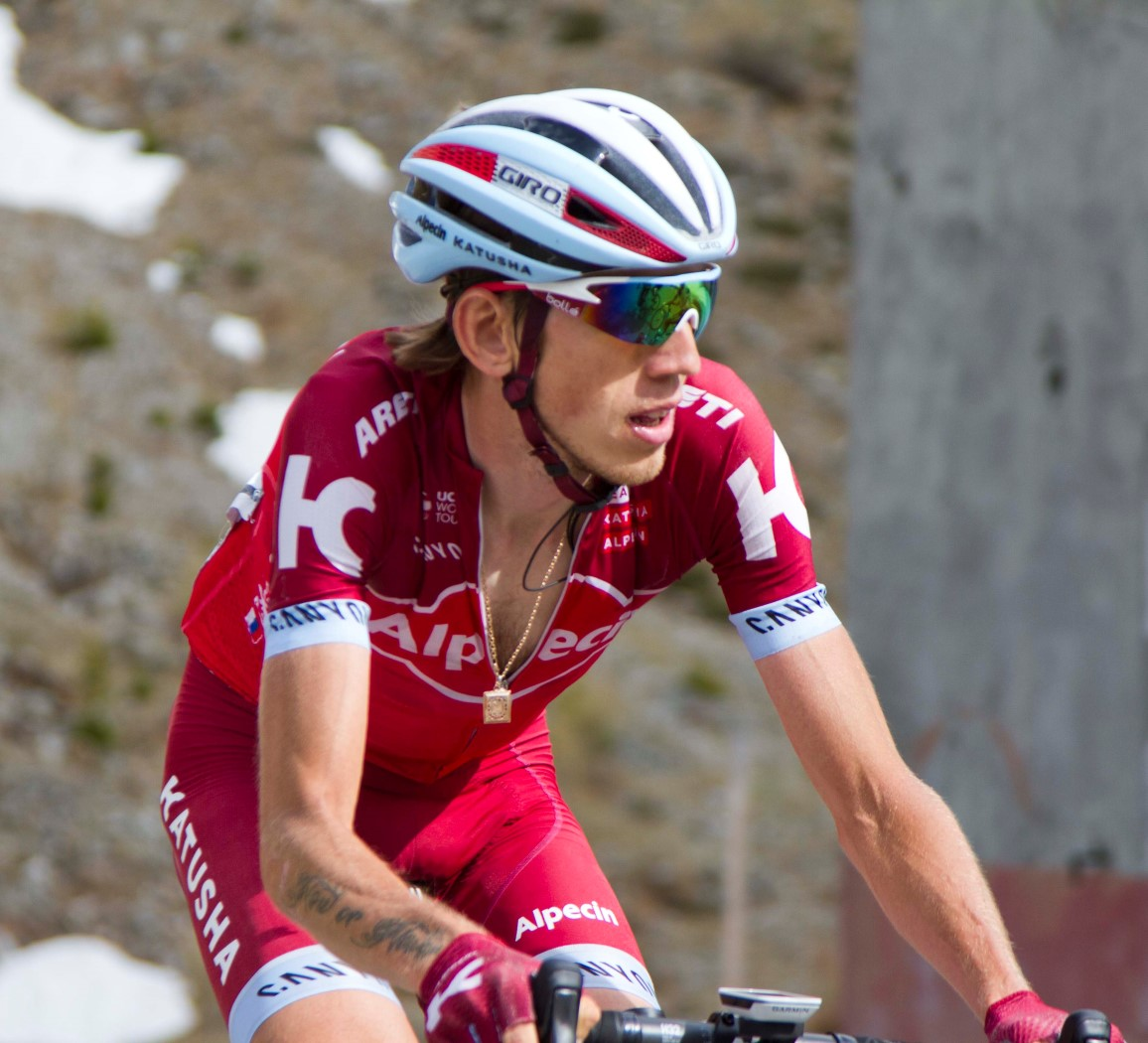
Zakarin at the 2017 Giro d'Italia

He started the season at the Volta a la Comunitat Valenciana stage race, and continued by riding the Abu Dhabi Tour in which he finished 2nd. He finished 5th at the Giro d'Italia after finishing 2nd on three individual stages. On 10 July 2017, Zakarin renewed his contract with Team Katusha–Alpecin for two years. Zakarin finished in third place at the Vuelta a España; the last time a Russian stood on the podium was in 2007, when Denis Menchov won that race. Zakarin became Russian champion in the individual time trial during the season, and finished his season by representing Russia at the World Championships.

He won the 2017 award for "Athlete of the year" in Tatarstan, and received the prize at the ceremony of athletes of the year of Tatarstan on 18 December at the Volga Region State Academy of Physical Culture, Sport and Tourism of the Republic of Tatarstan.

==== 2018 season ====
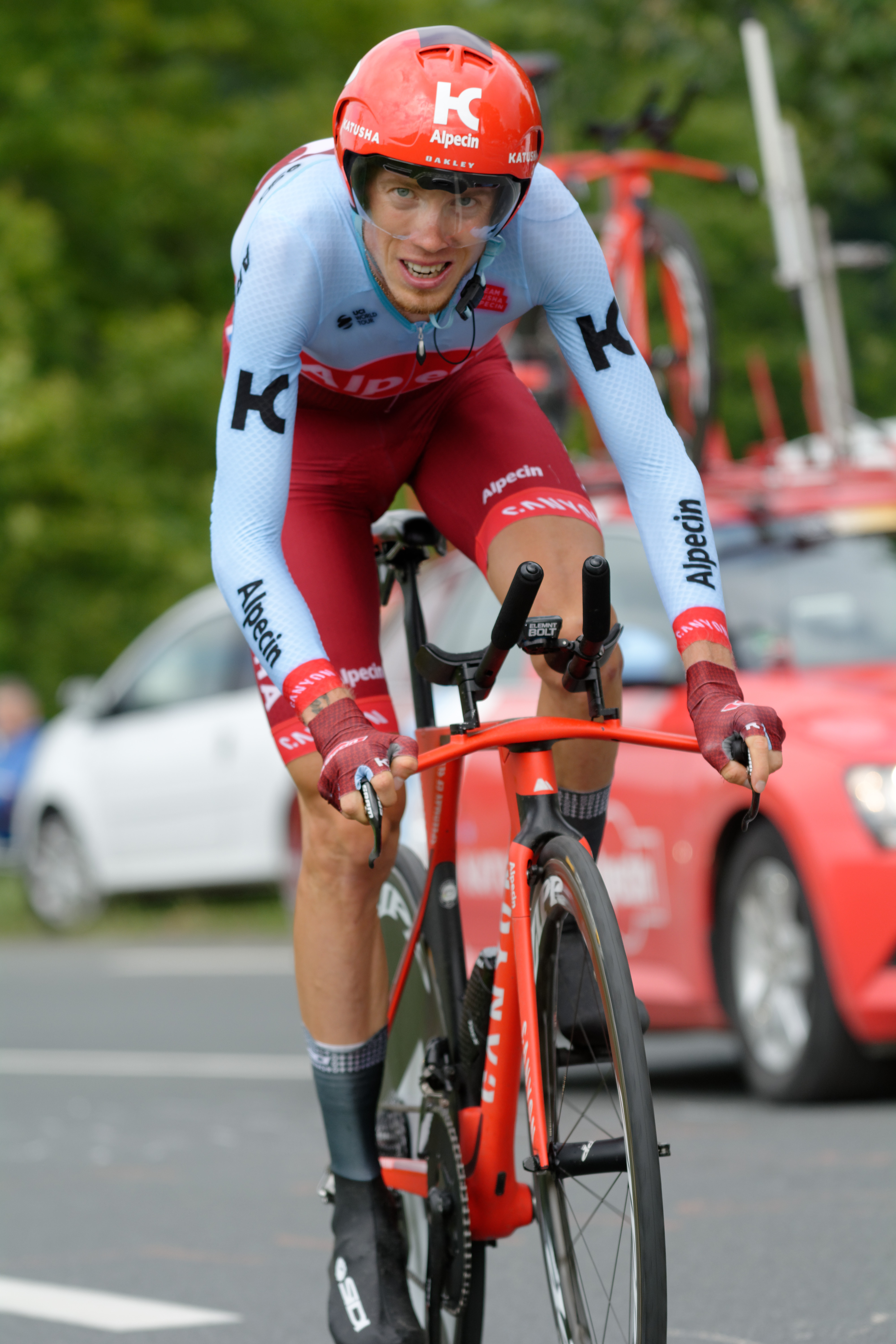
Zakarin at the 2018 Tour de France

He began the 2018 season at the Abu Dhabi Tour. He did not have any top 10 performances until the Critérium du Dauphiné where he finished 10th. He rode the Tour de France where he suffered a crash in the first week and survived the cobblestones of stage 9 where many general classification riders had a bad day; he was outside the top 10 going into the final week. The last two high mountain stages to Saint-Lary-Soulan and Laruns were the highlight for Zakarin where he finished in 10th place on both, then placed 7th on the final individual time trial; he finished the race in ninth overall. Later in the year at the Vuelta a España he finished 20th.

=== CCC Team ===
In August 2019, it was announced that Zakarin was to join the CCC Team on a two-year contract.

=== Gazprom–RusVelo ===
After one season with CCC Team, Zakarin signed a two-year contract with Gazprom–RusVelo in October 2020.

== Personal life ==
Zakarin is a native of Naberezhnye Chelny in the Tatarstan region of Russia, and lives in Cyprus. He is married to Viktoria, a nutritionist. The couple's first child, a daughter, Kristina, was born in 2016. His brother Aydar Zakarin is also a racing cyclist. He is a Muslim, goes to mosque during the year, and listens to Tatari music to remind him of home. He is also a book lover.

== Major results ==
2006
8th Time trial, UCI Juniors World Championships
2007
1st Time trial, UEC European Junior Road Championships
2011
10th Overall Giro della Regione Friuli Venezia Giulia
2012
1st Overall Grand Prix of Adygeya

1st Points classification
1st Stages 2 & 4

1st Grand Prix of Donetsk
4th Overall Tour Alsace

1st Stage 5 (ITT)

8th Duo Normand (with Alexander Rybakov)
9th Overall Girobio

1st Points classification
1st Stage 5

10th Overall Grand Prix of Sochi
2013
1st Time trial, National Road Championships
3rd Overall Grand Prix of Adygeya

1st Stage 1 (ITT)

5th Duo Normand (with Alexander Rybakov)
2014
1st Overall Tour d'Azerbaïdjan
1st Overall Grand Prix of Sochi
1st Overall Grand Prix of Adygeya

1st Stage 1 (ITT)

2nd Overall Tour of Slovenia
3rd Gran Premio Bruno Beghelli
2015
1st Overall Tour de Romandie
1st Stage 11 Giro d'Italia
3rd Overall Arctic Race of Norway
4th Overall Tour de Pologne
9th Overall Tour of the Basque Country
10th Overall Tour de San Luis
2016
1st Stage 17 Tour de France
3rd Vuelta a Murcia
4th Overall Paris–Nice

1st Stage 6

4th Overall Tour de Romandie
5th Liège–Bastogne–Liège
7th Overall Volta a Catalunya
7th Overall Volta ao Algarve
2017
1st Time trial, National Road Championships
2nd Overall Abu Dhabi Tour
3rd Overall Vuelta a España
5th Overall Giro d'Italia
6th Overall Paris–Nice
2018
7th GP Miguel Induráin
9th Overall Tour de France
10th Overall Critérium du Dauphiné
2019
8th Overall Tour de Romandie
10th Overall Giro d'Italia

1st Stage 13

10th Overall Paris–Nice
2020
7th Overall UAE Tour
2021
2nd Road race, National Road Championships
8th Overall Vuelta Asturias
9th Overall Settimana Ciclistica Italiana

=== General classification results timeline ===
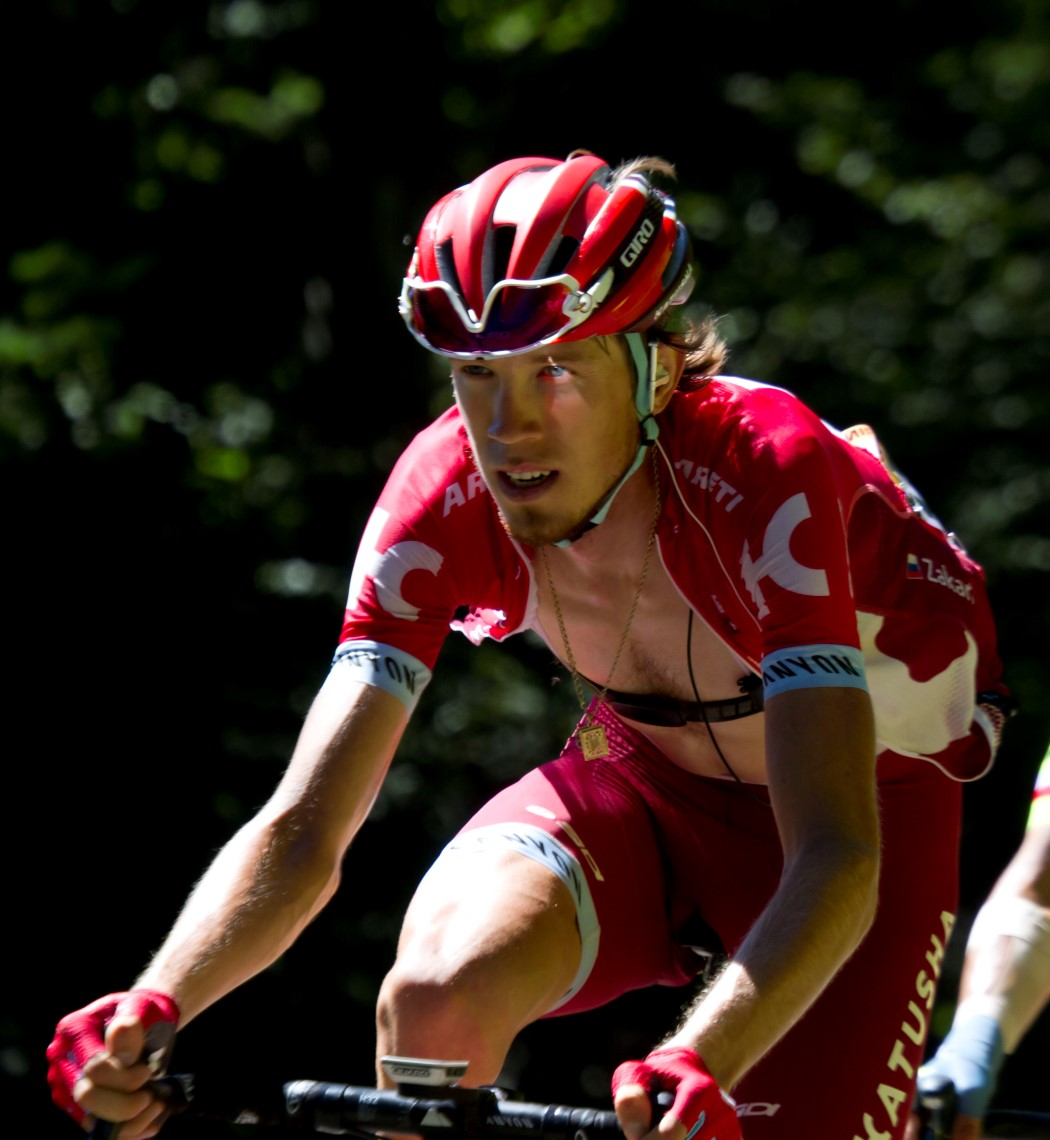
Zakarin made his Tour de France début in 2016, finishing 25th overall.

Grand Tour general classification results
Grand Tour	2015	2016	2017	2018	2019	2020	2021
Giro d'Italia	44	DNF	5	—	10	22	—
Tour de France	—	25	—	9	51	DNF	—
Vuelta a España	—	—	3	20	—	—	—
Major stage race general classification results
Race	2015	2016	2017	2018	2019	2020	2021
Paris–Nice	—	4	6	16	10	—	—
Tirreno–Adriatico	—	—	—	—	—	—	31
Volta a Catalunya	—	7	DNF	—	17	NH	DNF
Tour of the Basque Country	9	—	—	21	—	NH	—
Tour de Romandie	1	4	15	—	8	NH	—
Critérium du Dauphiné	—	—	—	10	—	—	—
Tour de Suisse	—	—	—	—	—	NH	—

=== Monuments results ===
Monument	2015	2016	2017	2018	2019	2020	2021
Milan–San Remo	Has not contested during his career						
Tour of Flanders	Has not contested during his career						
Paris–Roubaix	Has not contested during his career						
Liège–Bastogne–Liège	—	5	—	45	22	—	53
Giro di Lombardia	DNF	—	—	DNF	DNF	—	—

Legend
—	Did not compete
DNF	Did not finish
NH	Not held

== See also ==
- List of doping cases in cycling
