= List of teams and cyclists in the 2016 Giro d'Italia =

The 2016 Giro d'Italia is the first of cycling's Grand Tours to take place in the 2016 road cycling season. It is the 99th edition of the Giro d'Italia and takes place over 21 stages, beginning in the Netherlands on 6 May and finishing in Turin on 29 May. After the first three stages take place in the Netherlands, most of the rest of the race will take place in Italy; France hosts one stage start and one stage finish, while Switzerland also hosts a stage start.

The eighteen UCI WorldTeams were automatically invited and obliged to enter the race. In January 2016, four UCI Professional Continental teams were awarded wildcard places in the race by RCS Sport, the organisers of the Giro, to complete the 22-team peloton. With nine riders on each team, the peloton consists of 198 riders. These riders came from 34 countries; more than a quarter of the peloton (53 riders) were Italian, while no other nation had more than 20 riders participating in the race.

== Teams ==
All 18 UCI WorldTeams were automatically invited and were obliged to attend the race. As the winner of the 2015 Coppa Italia competition, Southeast–Venezuela were automatically given a wildcard invitation. There were two surprises in the remaining three wildcard invitations: Androni Giocattoli–Sidermec were not invited, nor were the Dutch Roompot–Oranje Peloton, even though the race began in the Netherlands. Two of the remaining wildcards were given to Italian teams – Nippo–Vini Fantini and Bardiani–CSF – and the last place was given to the Russian team Gazprom–RusVelo. In the week before the race, Southeast–Venezuela changed its name to Wilier Triestina–Southeast.

UCI WorldTeams

- Astana (riders)
- AG2R La Mondiale (riders)
- FDJ (riders)
- Team Sky (riders)
- Tinkoff (riders)
- Movistar Team (riders)
- BMC Racing Team (riders)
- Lotto–Soudal (riders)
- Team Giant–Alpecin (riders)
- Team Katusha (riders)
- Orica–GreenEDGE (riders)
- Etixx–Quick-Step (riders)
- LottoNL–Jumbo (riders)
- Trek–Segafredo (riders)
- Lampre–Merida (riders)
- Cannondale (riders)
- IAM Cycling (riders)
- Team Dimension Data (riders)

UCI Professional Continental teams

- Bardiani–CSF (riders)
- Gazprom–RusVelo (riders)
- Nippo–Vini Fantini (riders)
- Wilier Triestina–Southeast (riders)

== Cyclists ==
Legend
No.	Starting number worn by the rider during the Giro
Pos.	Position in the general classification
Time	Deficit to the winner of the general classification
†	Denotes riders born on or after 1 January 1991 eligible for the young rider classification
General classification	Denotes the winner of the general classification
Points classification	Denotes the winner of the points classification
Mountains classification	Denotes the winner of the mountains classification
Young rider classification	Denotes the winner of the young rider classification (eligibility indicated by †)
HD	Denotes a rider who failed to finish within the time limit, followed by the stage in which this occurred
DNS	Denotes a rider who did not start, followed by the stage before which he withdrew
DNF	Denotes a rider who did not finish, followed by the stage in which he withdrew
Ages correct as of 6 May 2016, the date on which the Giro began

=== By starting number ===
No.	Name	Nationality	Team	Age	Pos.	Time	Ref.
1	Domenico Pozzovivo	Italy	AG2R La Mondiale	33	20	+ 51' 49"	
2	Guillaume Bonnafond	France	AG2R La Mondiale	28	54	+ 2h 32' 28"	
3	Axel Domont	France	AG2R La Mondiale	25	50	+ 2h 21' 03"	
4	Hubert Dupont	France	AG2R La Mondiale	35	11	+ 24' 33"	
5	Patrick Gretsch	Germany	AG2R La Mondiale	29	DNF-13	–	
6	Hugo Houle	Canada	AG2R La Mondiale	25	72	+ 3h 20' 38"	
7	Blel Kadri	France	AG2R La Mondiale	29	147	+ 4h 43' 48"	
8	Matteo Montaguti	Italy	AG2R La Mondiale	32	19	+ 43' 49"	
9	Jean-Christophe Péraud	France	AG2R La Mondiale	38	DNF-3	–	
11	Vincenzo Nibali	Italy	Astana	31	1	86h 32' 49"	
12	Valerio Agnoli	Italy	Astana	31	DNS-12	–	
13	Eros Capecchi	Italy	Astana	29	82	+ 3h 29' 48"	
14	Jakob Fuglsang	Denmark	Astana	31	12	+ 24' 59"	
15	Tanel Kangert	Estonia	Astana	29	23	+ 59' 30"	
16	Bakhtiyar Kozhatayev †	Kazakhstan	Astana	24	65	+ 3h 08' 06"	
17	Davide Malacarne	Italy	Astana	28	47	+ 2h 13' 24"	
18	Michele Scarponi	Italy	Astana	36	16	+ 38' 09"	
19	Andrey Zeits	Kazakhstan	Astana	29	33	+ 1h 32' 53"	
21	Stefano Pirazzi	Italy	Bardiani–CSF	29	18	+ 41' 00"	
22	Simone Andreetta †	Italy	Bardiani–CSF	22	141	+ 4h 36' 25"	
23	Paolo Simion †	Italy	Bardiani–CSF	23	131	+ 4h 23' 26"	
24	Nicola Boem	Italy	Bardiani–CSF	26	139	+ 4h 35' 56"	
25	Francesco Manuel Bongiorno	Italy	Bardiani–CSF	25	109	+ 3h 59' 07"	
26	Giulio Ciccone †	Italy	Bardiani–CSF	21	DNS-19	–	
27	Sonny Colbrelli	Italy	Bardiani–CSF	25	95	+ 3h 48' 07"	
28	Mirco Maestri †	Italy	Bardiani–CSF	24	119	+ 4h 14' 10"	
29	Nicola Ruffoni	Italy	Bardiani–CSF	25	DNS-13	–	
31	Manuel Senni †	Italy	BMC Racing Team	24	76	+ 3h 22' 42"	
32	Darwin Atapuma	Colombia	BMC Racing Team	28	9	+ 14' 09"	
33	Alessandro De Marchi	Italy	BMC Racing Team	29	94	+ 3h 44' 56"	
34	Silvan Dillier	Switzerland	BMC Racing Team	25	DNF-3	-	
35	Stefan Küng †	Switzerland	BMC Racing Team	22	60	+ 2h 52' 25"	
36	Daniel Oss	Italy	BMC Racing Team	29	111	+ 4h 06' 35"	
37	Manuel Quinziato	Italy	BMC Racing Team	36	117	+ 4h 11' 33"	
38	Joey Rosskopf	United States	BMC Racing Team	26	85	+ 3h 31' 50"	
39	Rick Zabel †	Germany	BMC Racing Team	21	140	+ 4h 36' 19"	
41	Rigoberto Urán	Colombia	Cannondale	29	7	+ 11' 47"	
42	André Cardoso	Portugal	Cannondale	31	14	+ 34' 12"	
43	Simon Clarke	Australia	Cannondale	29	67	+ 3h 13' 04"	
44	Joe Dombrowski †	United States	Cannondale	24	34	+ 1h 32' 56"	
45	Davide Formolo †	Italy	Cannondale	22	31	+ 1h 27' 19"	
46	Moreno Moser	Italy	Cannondale	25	41	+ 2h 01' 27"	
47	Ramūnas Navardauskas	Lithuania	Cannondale	28	122	+ 4h 16' 34"	
48	Alberto Bettiol †	Italy	Cannondale	22	86	+ 3h 33' 33"	
49	Nate Brown †	United States	Cannondale	24	48	+ 2h 15' 18"	
51	Igor Antón	Spain	Team Dimension Data	33	28	+ 1h 22' 43"	
52	Omar Fraile	Spain	Team Dimension Data	25	DNF-5	–	
53	Songezo Jim	South Africa	Team Dimension Data	25	144	+ 4h 40' 38"	
54	Merhawi Kudus †	Eritrea	Team Dimension Data	22	37	+ 1h 54' 34"	
55	Kristian Sbaragli	Italy	Team Dimension Data	25	93	+ 3h 44' 49"	
56	Kanstantsin Sivtsov	Belarus	Team Dimension Data	33	10	+ 16' 20"	
57	Jay Thomson	South Africa	Team Dimension Data	30	149	+ 4h 47' 03"	
58	Johann van Zyl †	South Africa	Team Dimension Data	25	79	+ 3h 28' 27"	
59	Jaco Venter	South Africa	Team Dimension Data	29	101	+ 3h 51' 01"	
61	Marcel Kittel	Germany	Etixx–Quick-Step	27	DNS-9	–	
62	Gianluca Brambilla	Italy	Etixx–Quick-Step	28	22	+ 57' 07"	
63	David de la Cruz	Spain	Etixx–Quick-Step	27	DNS-16	–	
64	Bob Jungels †	Luxembourg	Etixx–Quick-Step	23	6	+ 8' 31"	
65	Fabio Sabatini	Italy	Etixx–Quick-Step	31	DNS-15	–	
66	Pieter Serry	Belgium	Etixx–Quick-Step	27	70	+ 3h 19' 25"	
67	Matteo Trentin	Italy	Etixx–Quick-Step	27	74	+ 3h 21' 00"	
68	Carlos Verona †	Spain	Etixx–Quick-Step	23	43	+ 2h 05' 57"	
69	Łukasz Wiśniowski †	Poland	Etixx–Quick-Step	24	138	+ 4h 35' 16"	
71	Arnaud Démare †	France	FDJ	24	DNF-14	–	
72	Arnaud Courteille	France	FDJ	27	136	+ 4h 33' 09"	
73	Mickaël Delage	France	FDJ	30	148	+ 4h 45' 40"	
74	Murilo Fischer	Brazil	FDJ	36	152	+ 4h 49' 59"	
75	Alexandre Geniez	France	FDJ	28	DNF-4	–	
76	Ignatas Konovalovas	Lithuania	FDJ	30	134	+ 4h 31' 38"	
77	Olivier Le Gac †	France	FDJ	22	133	+ 4h 29' 26"	
78	Marc Sarreau †	France	FDJ	22	DNF-13	–	
79	Benoît Vaugrenard	France	FDJ	34	91	+ 3h 40' 01"	
81	Alexandr Kolobnev	Russia	Gazprom–RusVelo	35	73	+ 3h 20' 39"	
82	Aleksey Rybalkin †	Russia	Gazprom–RusVelo	22	106	+ 3h 58' 12"	
83	Artur Ershov	Russia	Gazprom–RusVelo	26	HD-15	–	
84	Sergey Firsanov	Russia	Gazprom–RusVelo	33	30	+ 1h 24' 38"	
85	Alexander Foliforov †	Russia	Gazprom–RusVelo	24	45	+ 2h 06' 37"	
86	Artem Ovechkin	Russia	Gazprom–RusVelo	29	142	+ 4h 36' 45"	
87	Ivan Savitskiy †	Russia	Gazprom–RusVelo	24	104	+ 3h 54' 08"	
88	Alexander Serov	Russia	Gazprom–RusVelo	33	128	+ 4h 21' 37"	
89	Andrey Solomennikov	Russia	Gazprom–RusVelo	28	127	+ 4h 20' 08"	
91	Heinrich Haussler	Australia	IAM Cycling	32	99	+ 3h 49' 24"	
92	Matthias Brändle	Austria	IAM Cycling	26	DNF-14	–	
93	Leigh Howard	Australia	IAM Cycling	26	DNS-15	–	
94	Roger Kluge	Germany	IAM Cycling	30	137	+ 4h 33' 28"	
95	Matteo Pelucchi	Italy	IAM Cycling	27	HD-6	–	
96	Stefan Denifl	Austria	IAM Cycling	28	52	+ 2h 21' 34"	
97	Larry Warbasse	United States	IAM Cycling	25	DNS-7	–	
98	Marcel Wyss	Switzerland	IAM Cycling	29	40	+ 2h 00' 13"	
99	Vegard Stake Laengen	Norway	IAM Cycling	27	83	+ 3h 30' 44"	
100	Diego Ulissi	Italy	Lampre–Merida	26	21	+ 56' 59"	
101	Valerio Conti †	Italy	Lampre–Merida	23	27	+ 1h 18' 38"	
102	Roberto Ferrari	Italy	Lampre–Merida	33	132	+ 4h 28' 08"	
103	Ilia Koshevoy †	Belarus	Lampre–Merida	25	97	+ 3h 48' 40"	
104	Sacha Modolo	Italy	Lampre–Merida	28	84	+ 3h 31' 30"	
105	Matej Mohorič †	Slovenia	Lampre–Merida	21	98	+ 3h 49' 14"	
106	Manuele Mori	Italy	Lampre–Merida	35	63	+ 3h 03' 47"	
107	Przemysław Niemiec	Poland	Lampre–Merida	36	DNF-14	–	
109	Simone Petilli †	Italy	Lampre–Merida	23	77	+ 3h 23' 08"	
111	Tim Wellens †	Belgium	Lotto–Soudal	24	96	+ 3h 48' 24"	
112	Lars Bak	Denmark	Lotto–Soudal	36	DNF-21	–	
113	Sean De Bie †	Belgium	Lotto–Soudal	24	108	+ 3h 58' 53"	
114	André Greipel	Germany	Lotto–Soudal	33	DNS-13	–	
115	Adam Hansen	Australia	Lotto–Soudal	34	68	+ 3h 13' 19"	
116	Pim Ligthart	Netherlands	Lotto–Soudal	27	126	+ 4h 19' 46"	
117	Maxime Monfort	Belgium	Lotto–Soudal	33	15	+ 34' 34"	
118	Jürgen Roelandts	Belgium	Lotto–Soudal	30	DNS-13	–	
119	Jelle Vanendert	Belgium	Lotto–Soudal	31	92	+ 3h 42' 29"	
121	Alejandro Valverde	Spain	Movistar Team	36	3	+ 1' 17"	
122	Andrey Amador	Costa Rica	Movistar Team	29	8	+ 13' 21"	
123	Carlos Betancur	Colombia	Movistar Team	26	DNF-19	–	
124	José Herrada	Spain	Movistar Team	30	62	+ 3h 03' 04"	
125	Javier Moreno	Spain	Movistar Team	31	DNF-7	–	
126	José Joaquín Rojas	Spain	Movistar Team	30	49	+ 2h 17' 44"	
127	Rory Sutherland	Australia	Movistar Team	34	80	+ 3h 28' 47"	
128	Jasha Sütterlin †	Germany	Movistar Team	24	113	+ 4h 07' 36"	
129	Giovanni Visconti	Italy	Movistar Team	33	13	+ 31' 38"	
131	Damiano Cunego	Italy	Nippo–Vini Fantini	34	44	+ 2h 06' 37"	
132	Giacomo Berlato †	Italy	Nippo–Vini Fantini	24	DNF-14	–	
133	Alessandro Bisolti	Italy	Nippo–Vini Fantini	31	81	+ 3h 29' 23"	
134	Grega Bole	Slovenia	Nippo–Vini Fantini	30	135	+ 4h 32' 04"	
135	Riccardo Stacchiotti †	Italy	Nippo–Vini Fantini	24	155	+ 5h 08' 00"	
136	Iuri Filosi †	Italy	Nippo–Vini Fantini	24	HD-8	–	
137	Eduard-Michael Grosu †	Romania	Nippo–Vini Fantini	23	153	+ 4h 53' 53"	
138	Genki Yamamoto †	Japan	Nippo–Vini Fantini	24	151	+ 4h 49' 05"	
139	Gianfranco Zilioli	Italy	Nippo–Vini Fantini	26	118	+ 4h 12' 52"	
141	Esteban Chaves	Colombia	Orica–GreenEDGE	26	2	+ 52"	
142	Sam Bewley	New Zealand	Orica–GreenEDGE	28	125	+ 4h 19' 37"	
143	Caleb Ewan †	Australia	Orica–GreenEDGE	21	DNS-13	–	
144	Michael Hepburn †	Australia	Orica–GreenEDGE	24	150	+ 4h 47' 59"	
145	Damien Howson †	Australia	Orica–GreenEDGE	23	53	+ 2h 25' 44"	
146	Luka Mezgec	Slovenia	Orica–GreenEDGE	27	DNS-17	–	
147	Rubén Plaza	Spain	Orica–GreenEDGE	36	56	+ 2h 40' 39"	
148	Svein Tuft	Canada	Orica–GreenEDGE	38	146	+ 4h 43' 04"	
149	Amets Txurruka	Spain	Orica–GreenEDGE	33	55	+ 2h 39' 42"	
151	Tom Dumoulin	Netherlands	Team Giant–Alpecin	25	DNF-11	–	
152	Nikias Arndt †	Germany	Team Giant–Alpecin	24	87	+ 3h 34' 14"	
153	Bert De Backer	Belgium	Team Giant–Alpecin	32	DNF-14	–	
154	Chad Haga	United States	Team Giant–Alpecin	27	78	+ 3h 25' 49"	
155	Ji Cheng	China	Team Giant–Alpecin	28	154	+ 5h 03' 42"	
156	Tobias Ludvigsson †	Sweden	Team Giant–Alpecin	25	51	+ 2h 21' 13"	
157	Georg Preidler	Austria	Team Giant–Alpecin	25	26	+ 1h 08' 05"	
158	Tom Stamsnijder	Netherlands	Team Giant–Alpecin	30	143	+ 4h 38' 30"	
159	Albert Timmer	Netherlands	Team Giant–Alpecin	30	121	+ 4h 16' 19"	
161	Ilnur Zakarin	Russia	Team Katusha	26	DNF-19	–	
162	Maxim Belkov	Russia	Team Katusha	31	116	+ 4h 10' 44"	
163	Pavel Kochetkov	Russia	Team Katusha	30	32	+ 1h 28' 35"	
164	Vyacheslav Kuznetsov	Russia	Team Katusha	26	123	+ 4h 18' 19"	
165	Anton Vorobyev	Russia	Team Katusha	25	100	+ 3h 50' 10"	
166	Alexander Porsev	Russia	Team Katusha	30	145	+ 4h 41' 38"	
167	Egor Silin	Russia	Team Katusha	27	38	+ 1h 56' 08"	
168	Rein Taaramäe	Estonia	Team Katusha	29	29	+ 1h 23' 22"	
169	Alexey Tsatevich	Russia	Team Katusha	26	DNS-10	–	
171	Steven Kruijswijk	Netherlands	LottoNL–Jumbo	28	4	+1' 50"	
172	Enrico Battaglin	Italy	LottoNL–Jumbo	26	42	+ 2h 02' 23"	
173	Moreno Hofland †	Netherlands	LottoNL–Jumbo	23	DNF-13	–	
174	Twan Castelijns	Netherlands	LottoNL–Jumbo	27	114	+ 4h 08' 24"	
175	Martijn Keizer	Netherlands	LottoNL–Jumbo	28	102	+ 3h 52' 57"	
176	Primož Roglič	Slovenia	LottoNL–Jumbo	26	58	+ 2h 43' 25"	
177	Bram Tankink	Netherlands	LottoNL–Jumbo	37	61	+ 2h 55' 43"	
178	Maarten Tjallingii	Netherlands	LottoNL–Jumbo	38	124	+ 4h 18' 22"	
179	Jos van Emden	Netherlands	LottoNL–Jumbo	31	120	+ 4h 15' 26"	
181	Mikel Landa	Spain	Team Sky	26	DNF-10	–	
182	Ian Boswell †	United States	Team Sky	25	71	+ 3h 19' 42"	
183	Philip Deignan	Ireland	Team Sky	32	DNF-19	–	
184	Sebastián Henao †	Colombia	Team Sky	22	17	+ 38' 09"	
185	Mikel Nieve	Spain	Team Sky	31	25	+ 1h 05' 22"	
186	David López	Spain	Team Sky	34	69	+ 3h 18' 34"	
187	Christian Knees	Germany	Team Sky	35	66	+ 3h 09' 06"	
188	Nicolas Roche	Ireland	Team Sky	31	24	+ 1h 04' 44"	
189	Elia Viviani	Italy	Team Sky	27	HD-8	–	
191	Rafał Majka	Poland	Tinkoff	26	5	+ 4' 37"	
192	Manuele Boaro	Italy	Tinkoff	28	46	+ 2h 11' 15"	
193	Pavel Brutt	Russia	Tinkoff	34	90	+ 3h 38' 02"	
194	Jesús Hernández	Spain	Tinkoff	34	59	+ 2h 44' 44"	
195	Jay McCarthy †	Australia	Tinkoff	23	88	+ 3h 35' 37"	
196	Paweł Poljański	Poland	Tinkoff	26	35	+ 1h 50' 37"	
197	Ivan Rovny	Russia	Tinkoff	28	36	+ 1h 51' 10"	
198	Evgeni Petrov	Russia	Tinkoff	37	75	+ 3h 21' 36"	
199	Matteo Tosatto	Italy	Tinkoff	41	107	+ 3h 58' 47"	
201	Ryder Hesjedal	Canada	Trek–Segafredo	35	DNF-14	–	
202	Eugenio Alafaci	Italy	Trek–Segafredo	25	105	+ 3h 56' 18"	
203	Jack Bobridge	Australia	Trek–Segafredo	26	156	+ 5h 08' 51"	
204	Fabian Cancellara	Switzerland	Trek–Segafredo	35	DNS-10	–	
205	Marco Coledan	Italy	Trek–Segafredo	27	129	+ 4h 22' 05"	
206	Laurent Didier	Luxembourg	Trek–Segafredo	31	64	+ 3h 07' 17"	
207	Giacomo Nizzolo	Italy	Trek–Segafredo	27	110	+ 4h 03' 51"	
208	Boy van Poppel	Netherlands	Trek–Segafredo	28	HD-8	–	
209	Riccardo Zoidl	Austria	Trek–Segafredo	28	39	+ 1h 57' 12"	
211	Filippo Pozzato	Italy	Wilier Triestina–Southeast	34	115	+ 4h 08' 54"	
212	Julen Amezqueta †	Spain	Wilier Triestina–Southeast	22	112	+ 4h 07' 22"	
213	Manuel Belletti	Italy	Wilier Triestina–Southeast	30	DNS-18	–	
214	Liam Bertazzo †	Italy	Wilier Triestina–Southeast	24	DNF-14	–	
215	Matteo Busato	Italy	Wilier Triestina–Southeast	28	57	+ 2h 43' 03"	
216	Cristián Rodríguez †	Spain	Wilier Triestina–Southeast	21	103	+ 3h 53' 15"	
217	Jakub Mareczko †	Italy	Wilier Triestina–Southeast	22	DNF-5	–	
218	Daniel Martínez †	Colombia	Wilier Triestina–Southeast	20	89	+ 3h 36' 41"	
219	Eugert Zhupa	Albania	Wilier Triestina–Southeast	26	130	+ 4h 23' 15"	

=== By team ===
AG2R La Mondiale (ALM)
No.	Rider	Pos.
1	Domenico Pozzovivo (ITA)	20
2	Guillaume Bonnafond (FRA)	54
3	Axel Domont (FRA)	50
4	Hubert Dupont (FRA)	11
5	Patrick Gretsch (DEU)	DNF–13
6	Hugo Houle (CAN)	72
7	Blel Kadri (FRA)	147
8	Matteo Montaguti (ITA)	19
9	Jean-Christophe Péraud (FRA)	DNF–3

Astana (AST)
No.	Rider	Pos.
11	Vincenzo Nibali (ITA)	1
12	Valerio Agnoli (ITA)	DNS-12
13	Eros Capecchi (ITA)	62
14	Jakob Fuglsang (DNK)	12
15	Tanel Kangert (EST)	23
16	Bakhtiyar Kozhatayev (KAZ) †	65
17	Davide Malacarne (ITA)	47
18	Michele Scarponi (ITA)	16
19	Andrey Zeits (KAZ)	33

Bardiani–CSF (CSF)
No.	Rider	Pos.
21	Stefano Pirazzi (ITA)	18
22	Simone Andreetta (ITA) †	141
23	Paolo Simion (ITA) †	131
24	Nicola Boem (ITA)	139
25	Francesco Manuel Bongiorno (ITA)	109
26	Giulio Ciccone (ITA) †	DNS-19
27	Sonny Colbrelli (ITA)	95
28	Mirco Maestri (ITA) †	119
29	Nicola Ruffoni (ITA)	DNS–13

BMC Racing Team (BMC)
No.	Rider	Pos.
31	Manuel Senni (ITA) †	76
32	Darwin Atapuma (COL)	9
33	Alessandro De Marchi (ITA)	94
34	Silvan Dillier (SUI)	DNF–3
35	Stefan Küng (SUI) †	60
36	Daniel Oss (ITA)	111
37	Manuel Quinziato (ITA)	117
38	Joey Rosskopf (USA)	85
39	Rick Zabel (DEU) †	140

Cannondale (CAN)
No.	Rider	Pos.
41	Rigoberto Urán (COL)	7
42	André Cardoso (POR)	14
43	Simon Clarke (AUS)	67
44	Joe Dombrowski (USA) †	34
45	Davide Formolo (ITA) †	31
46	Moreno Moser (ITA)	41
47	Ramūnas Navardauskas (LTU)	122
48	Alberto Bettiol (ITA) †	86
49	Nate Brown (USA) †	48

Team Dimension Data (DDD)
No.	Rider	Pos.
51	Igor Antón (ESP)	28
52	Omar Fraile (ESP)	DNF–5
53	Songezo Jim (RSA)	144
54	Merhawi Kudus (ERI) †	37
55	Kristian Sbaragli (ITA)	93
56	Kanstantsin Sivtsov (BLR)	10
57	Jay Thomson (RSA)	149
58	Johann van Zyl (RSA) †	79
59	Jaco Venter (RSA)	101

Etixx–Quick-Step (EQS)
No.	Rider	Pos.
61	Marcel Kittel (DEU)	DNS-9
62	Gianluca Brambilla (ITA)	22
63	David de la Cruz (ESP)	DNS-16
64	Bob Jungels (LUX) †	6
65	Fabio Sabatini (ITA)	DNS-15
66	Pieter Serry (BEL)	70
67	Matteo Trentin (ITA)	74
68	Carlos Verona (ESP) †	43
69	Łukasz Wiśniowski (POL) †	138

FDJ (FDJ)
No.	Rider	Pos.
71	Arnaud Démare (FRA) †	DNF–14
72	Arnaud Courteille (FRA)	136
73	Mickaël Delage (FRA)	148
74	Murilo Fischer (BRA)	152
75	Alexandre Geniez (FRA)	DNF–4
76	Ignatas Konovalovas (LTU)	134
77	Olivier Le Gac (FRA) †	133
78	Marc Sarreau (FRA) †	DNF–13
79	Benoît Vaugrenard (FRA)	91

Gazprom–RusVelo (GAZ)
No.	Rider	Pos.
81	Alexandr Kolobnev (RUS)	73
82	Aleksey Rybalkin (RUS) †	106
83	Artur Ershov (RUS)	HD-15
84	Sergey Firsanov (RUS)	30
85	Alexander Foliforov (RUS) †	45
86	Artem Ovechkin (RUS)	142
87	Ivan Savitskiy (RUS) †	104
88	Alexander Serov (RUS)	128
89	Andrey Solomennikov (RUS)	127

IAM Cycling (IAM)
No.	Rider	Pos.
91	Heinrich Haussler (AUS)	99
92	Matthias Brändle (AUT)	DNF–14
93	Leigh Howard (AUS)	DNS-15
94	Roger Kluge (DEU)	137
95	Matteo Pelucchi (ITA)	HD-6
96	Stefan Denifl (AUT)	52
97	Larry Warbasse (USA)	DNS–7
98	Marcel Wyss (SUI)	40
99	Vegard Stake Laengen (NOR)	83

Lampre–Merida (LAM)
No.	Rider	Pos.
100	Diego Ulissi (ITA)	21
101	Valerio Conti (ITA) †	27
102	Roberto Ferrari (ITA)	132
103	Ilia Koshevoy (BLR) †	97
104	Sacha Modolo (ITA)	84
105	Matej Mohorič (SLO) †	98
106	Manuele Mori (ITA)	63
107	Przemysław Niemiec (POL)	DNF–14
109	Simone Petilli (ITA) †	77

Lotto–Soudal (LTS)
No.	Rider	Pos.
111	Tim Wellens (BEL) †	96
112	Lars Bak (DNK)	DNF-21
113	Sean De Bie (BEL) †	108
114	André Greipel (DEU)	DNS–13
115	Adam Hansen (AUS)	68
116	Pim Ligthart (NED)	126
117	Maxime Monfort (BEL)	15
118	Jürgen Roelandts (BEL)	DNS–13
119	Jelle Vanendert (BEL)	92

Movistar Team (MOV)
No.	Rider	Pos.
121	Alejandro Valverde (ESP)	3
122	Andrey Amador (CRC)	8
123	Carlos Betancur (COL)	DNF-19
124	José Herrada (ESP)	62
125	Javier Moreno (ESP)	DNF–7
126	José Joaquín Rojas (ESP)	49
127	Rory Sutherland (AUS)	80
128	Jasha Sütterlin (DEU) †	113
129	Giovanni Visconti (ITA)	13

Nippo–Vini Fantini (NIP)
No.	Rider	Pos.
131	Damiano Cunego (ITA)	44
132	Giacomo Berlato (ITA) †	DNF–14
133	Alessandro Bisolti (ITA)	81
134	Grega Bole (SLO)	135
135	Riccardo Stacchiotti (ITA) †	155
136	Iuri Filosi (ITA) †	HD-8
137	Eduard-Michael Grosu (ROU) †	153
138	Genki Yamamoto (JPN) †	151
139	Gianfranco Zilioli (ITA)	118

Orica–GreenEDGE (OGE)
No.	Rider	Pos.
141	Esteban Chaves (COL)	2
142	Sam Bewley (NZL)	125
143	Caleb Ewan (AUS) †	DNS–13
144	Michael Hepburn (AUS) †	150
145	Damien Howson (AUS) †	53
146	Luka Mezgec (SLO)	DNS-17
147	Rubén Plaza (ESP)	56
148	Svein Tuft (CAN)	146
149	Amets Txurruka (ESP)	55

Team Giant–Alpecin (TGA)
No.	Rider	Pos.
151	Tom Dumoulin (NED)	DNF-11
152	Nikias Arndt (DEU) †	87
153	Bert De Backer (BEL)	DNF–14
154	Chad Haga (USA)	78
155	Ji Cheng (CHN)	154
156	Tobias Ludvigsson (SWE) †	51
157	Georg Preidler (AUT)	26
158	Tom Stamsnijder (NED)	143
159	Albert Timmer (NED)	121

Team Katusha (KAT)
No.	Rider	Pos.
161	Ilnur Zakarin (RUS)	DNF-19
162	Maxim Belkov (RUS)	116
163	Pavel Kochetkov (RUS)	32
164	Vyacheslav Kuznetsov (RUS)	123
165	Anton Vorobyev (RUS)	100
166	Alexander Porsev (RUS)	145
167	Egor Silin (RUS)	38
168	Rein Taaramäe (EST)	29
169	Alexey Tsatevich (RUS)	DNS-10

LottoNL–Jumbo (TLJ)
No.	Rider	Pos.
171	Steven Kruijswijk (NED)	4
172	Enrico Battaglin (ITA)	42
173	Moreno Hofland (NED) †	DNF–13
174	Twan Castelijns (NED)	114
175	Martijn Keizer (NED)	102
176	Primož Roglič (SLO)	58
177	Bram Tankink (NED)	61
178	Maarten Tjallingii (NED)	124
179	Jos van Emden (NED)	120

Team Sky (SKY)
No.	Rider	Pos.
181	Mikel Landa (ESP)	DNF-10
182	Ian Boswell (USA) †	71
183	Philip Deignan (IRL)	DNF-19
184	Sebastián Henao (COL) †	17
185	Mikel Nieve (ESP)	25
186	David López (ESP)	69
187	Christian Knees (DEU)	66
188	Nicolas Roche (IRL)	24
189	Elia Viviani (ITA)	HD-8

Tinkoff (TNK)
No.	Rider	Pos.
191	Rafał Majka (POL)	5
192	Manuele Boaro (ITA)	46
193	Pavel Brutt (RUS)	90
194	Jesús Hernández (ESP)	59
195	Jay McCarthy (AUS) †	88
196	Paweł Poljański (POL)	35
197	Ivan Rovny (RUS)	36
198	Evgeni Petrov (RUS)	75
199	Matteo Tosatto (ITA)	107

Trek–Segafredo (TFR)
No.	Rider	Pos.
201	Ryder Hesjedal (CAN)	DNF–14
202	Eugenio Alafaci (ITA)	105
203	Jack Bobridge (AUS)	156
204	Fabian Cancellara (SUI)	DNS-10
205	Marco Coledan (ITA)	129
206	Laurent Didier (LUX)	64
207	Giacomo Nizzolo (ITA)	110
208	Boy van Poppel (NED)	HD-8
209	Riccardo Zoidl (AUT)	39

Wilier Triestina–Southeast (STH)
No.	Rider	Pos.
211	Filippo Pozzato (ITA)	115
212	Julen Amezqueta (ESP) †	112
213	Manuel Belletti (ITA)	DNS–18
214	Liam Bertazzo (ITA) †	DNF–14
215	Matteo Busato (ITA)	57
216	Cristián Rodríguez (ESP) †	103
217	Jakub Mareczko (ITA) †	DNF–5
218	Daniel Martínez (COL) †	89
219	Eugert Zhupa (ALB)	130

=== By nationality ===
The 198 riders that are competing in the 2016 Giro d'Italia originated from 34 different countries.

Country	No. of riders	Finishers	Stage wins
Albania	1	1	
Australia	10	8	
Austria	4	3	
Belarus	2	2	
Belgium	7	5	1 (Tim Wellens)
Brazil	1	1	
Canada	3	2	
China	1	1	
Colombia	6	5	1 (Esteban Chaves)
Costa Rica	1	1	
Denmark	2	1	
Eritrea	1	1	
Estonia	2	2	1 (Rein Taaramäe)
France	12	8	
Germany	8	5	7 (André Greipel x3, Marcel Kittel x2, Roger Kluge, Nikias Arndt)
Ireland	2	1	
Italy	53	42	6 (Diego Ulissi x2, Gianluca Brambilla, Giulio Ciccone, Vincenzo Nibali, Matteo Trentin)
Japan	1	1	
Kazakhstan	2	2	
Lithuania	2	2	
Luxembourg	2	2	
Netherlands	12	9	1 (Tom Dumoulin)
New Zealand	1	1	
Norway	1	1	
Poland	4	3	
Portugal	1	1	
Romania	1	1	
Russia	20	17	1 (Alexander Foliforov)
Slovenia	4	3	1 (Primož Roglič)
South Africa	4	4	
Spain	16	12	2 (Mikel Nieve, Alejandro Valverde)
Sweden	1	1	
Switzerland	4	2	
United States	6	5	
Total	198	156	21
