= 2016 Giro d'Italia, Stage 12 to Stage 21 =

Cycling race stages

The 2016 Giro d'Italia began on 6 May, and stage 21 occurred on 29 May.

Legend
A pink jersey	Denotes the leader of the General classification	A blue jersey	Denotes the leader of the Mountains classification
A red jersey	Denotes the leader of the Points classification	A white jersey	Denotes the leader of the Young rider classification
	s.t. indicates that the rider crossed the finish line in the same group as the one receiving the time above him, and was therefore credited with the same finishing time.		

== Stage 12 ==
19 May 2016 — Noale to Bibione, 182 km (113.1 mi)

Result of Stage 12
Rank	Rider	Team	Time
1	André Greipel (GER)	Lotto–Soudal	4h 16' 00"
2	Caleb Ewan (AUS)	Orica–GreenEDGE	s.t.
3	Giacomo Nizzolo (ITA)	Trek–Segafredo	s.t.
4	Sacha Modolo (ITA)	Lampre–Merida	s.t.
5	Alexander Porsev (RUS)	Team Katusha	s.t.
6	Moreno Hofland (NED)	LottoNL–Jumbo	s.t.
7	Ivan Savitskiy (RUS)	Gazprom–RusVelo	s.t.
8	Heinrich Haussler (AUS)	IAM Cycling	s.t.
9	Rick Zabel (GER)	BMC Racing Team	s.t.
10	Sonny Colbrelli (ITA)	Bardiani–CSF	s.t.

General classification after Stage 12
Rank	Rider	Team	Time
1	Bob Jungels (LUX)	Etixx–Quick-Step	49h 32' 20"
2	Andrey Amador (CRC)	Movistar Team	+ 24"
3	Alejandro Valverde (ESP)	Movistar Team	+ 1' 07"
4	Steven Kruijswijk (NED)	LottoNL–Jumbo	+ 1' 07"
5	Vincenzo Nibali (ITA)	XDS Astana Team	+ 1' 09"
6	Rafał Majka (POL)	Tinkoff	+ 2' 01"
7	Ilnur Zakarin (RUS)	Team Katusha	+ 2' 25"
8	Esteban Chaves (COL)	Orica–GreenEDGE	+ 2' 43"
9	Gianluca Brambilla (ITA)	Etixx–Quick-Step	+ 2' 45"
10	Diego Ulissi (ITA)	Lampre–Merida	+ 2' 47"

== Stage 13 ==
20 May 2016 — Palmanova to Cividale del Friuli, 170 km (105.6 mi)

Result of Stage 13
Rank	Rider	Team	Time
1	Mikel Nieve (ESP)	Team Sky	4h 31' 49"
2	Giovanni Visconti (ITA)	Movistar Team	+ 43"
3	Vincenzo Nibali (ITA)	XDS Astana Team	+ 1' 17"
4	Alejandro Valverde (ESP)	Movistar Team	+ 1' 17"
5	Rafał Majka (POL)	Tinkoff	+ 1' 17"
6	Stefan Denifl (AUT)	IAM Cycling	+ 1' 17"
7	Steven Kruijswijk (NED)	LottoNL–Jumbo	+ 1' 17"
8	Rigoberto Urán (COL)	Cannondale	+ 1' 17"
9	Matteo Montaguti (ITA)	AG2R La Mondiale	+ 1' 17"
10	Domenico Pozzovivo (ITA)	AG2R La Mondiale	+ 1' 17"

General classification after Stage 13
Rank	Rider	Team	Time
1	Andrey Amador (CRC)	Movistar Team	54h 05' 50"
2	Bob Jungels (LUX)	Etixx–Quick-Step	+ 26"
3	Vincenzo Nibali (ITA)	XDS Astana Team	+ 41"
4	Alejandro Valverde (ESP)	Movistar Team	+ 43"
5	Steven Kruijswijk (NED)	LottoNL–Jumbo	+ 43"
6	Rafał Majka (POL)	Tinkoff	+ 1' 37"
7	Ilnur Zakarin (RUS)	Team Katusha	+ 2' 01"
8	Esteban Chaves (COL)	Orica–GreenEDGE	+ 2' 19"
9	Rigoberto Urán (COL)	Cannondale	+ 2' 48"
10	Jakob Fuglsang (DEN)	Astana	+ 3' 15"

== Stage 14 ==
21 May 2016 — Alpago (Farra) to Corvara (Alta Badia), 210 km (130.5 mi)

Result of Stage 14
Rank	Rider	Team	Time
1	Esteban Chaves (COL)	Orica–GreenEDGE	6h 06' 16"
2	Steven Kruijswijk (NED)	LottoNL–Jumbo	s.t.
3	Georg Preidler (AUT)	Team Giant–Alpecin	s.t.
4	Darwin Atapuma (COL)	BMC Racing Team	+ 6"
5	Vincenzo Nibali (ITA)	XDS Astana Team	+ 37"
6	Kanstantsin Siutsou (BLR)	Team Dimension Data	+ 37"
7	Ilnur Zakarin (RUS)	Team Katusha	+ 2' 29"
8	Rafał Majka (POL)	Tinkoff	+ 2' 29"
9	Rigoberto Urán (COL)	Cannondale	+ 2' 50"
10	Domenico Pozzovivo (ITA)	AG2R La Mondiale	+ 3' 00"

General classification after Stage 14
Rank	Rider	Team	Time
1	Steven Kruijswijk (NED)	LottoNL–Jumbo	60h 12' 43"
2	Vincenzo Nibali (ITA)	XDS Astana Team	+ 41"
3	Esteban Chaves (COL)	Orica–GreenEDGE	+ 1' 32"
4	Alejandro Valverde (ESP)	Movistar Team	+ 3' 06"
5	Andrey Amador (CRC)	Movistar Team	+ 3' 15"
6	Rafał Majka (POL)	Tinkoff	+ 3' 29"
7	Ilnur Zakarin (RUS)	Team Katusha	+ 3' 53"
8	Rigoberto Urán (COL)	Cannondale	+ 5' 01"
9	Kanstantsin Siutsou (BLR)	Team Dimension Data	+ 5' 38"
10	Jakob Fuglsang (DEN)	Astana	+ 5' 38"

== Stage 15 ==
22 May 2016 — Castelrotto/Kastelruth to Alpe di Siusi/Seiser Alm, 10.8 km (6.7 mi) Individual time trial

Result of Stage 15
Rank	Rider	Team	Time
1	Alexander Foliforov (RUS)	Gazprom–RusVelo	28' 39"
2	Steven Kruijswijk (NED)	LottoNL–Jumbo	s.t.
3	Alejandro Valverde (ESP)	Movistar Team	+ 23"
4	Sergey Firsanov (RUS)	Gazprom–RusVelo	+ 30"
5	Michele Scarponi (ITA)	Astana	+ 36"
6	Esteban Chaves (COL)	Orica–GreenEDGE	+ 40"
7	Ilnur Zakarin (RUS)	Team Katusha	+ 47"
8	Joe Dombrowski (USA)	Cannondale	+ 52"
9	Bob Jungels (LUX)	Etixx–Quick-Step	+ 1' 04"
10	Rafał Majka (POL)	Tinkoff	+ 1' 09"

General classification after Stage 15
Rank	Rider	Team	Time
1	Steven Kruijswijk (NED)	LottoNL–Jumbo	60h 41' 22"
2	Esteban Chaves (COL)	Orica–GreenEDGE	+ 2' 12"
3	Vincenzo Nibali (ITA)	XDS Astana Team	+ 2' 51"
4	Alejandro Valverde (ESP)	Movistar Team	+ 3' 29"
5	Rafał Majka (POL)	Tinkoff	+ 4' 38"
6	Ilnur Zakarin (RUS)	Team Katusha	+ 4' 40"
7	Andrey Amador (CRC)	Movistar Team	+ 5' 27"
8	Bob Jungels (LUX)	Etixx–Quick-Step	+ 7' 14"
9	Kanstantsin Siutsou (BLR)	Team Dimension Data	+ 7' 37"
10	Jakob Fuglsang (DEN)	Astana	+ 7' 55"

== Stage 16 ==
24 May 2016 — Bressanone/Brixen to Andalo, 132 km (82.0 mi)

Result of Stage 16
Rank	Rider	Team	Time
1	Alejandro Valverde (ESP)	Movistar Team	2h 58' 54"
2	Steven Kruijswijk (NED)	LottoNL–Jumbo	s.t.
3	Ilnur Zakarin (RUS)	Team Katusha	+ 8"
4	Diego Ulissi (ITA)	Lampre–Merida	+ 37"
5	Bob Jungels (LUX)	Etixx–Quick-Step	+ 37"
6	David López (ESP)	Team Sky	+ 38"
7	Sergey Firsanov (RUS)	Gazprom–RusVelo	+ 38"
8	Esteban Chaves (COL)	Orica–GreenEDGE	+ 42"
9	Rafał Majka (POL)	Tinkoff	+ 50"
10	Domenico Pozzovivo (ITA)	AG2R La Mondiale	+ 1' 47"

General classification after Stage 16
Rank	Rider	Team	Time
1	Steven Kruijswijk (NED)	LottoNL–Jumbo	63h 40' 10"
2	Esteban Chaves (COL)	Orica–GreenEDGE	+ 3' 00"
3	Alejandro Valverde (ESP)	Movistar Team	+ 3' 23"
4	Vincenzo Nibali (ITA)	XDS Astana Team	+ 4' 43"
5	Ilnur Zakarin (RUS)	Team Katusha	+ 4' 50"
6	Rafał Majka (POL)	Tinkoff	+ 5' 34"
7	Bob Jungels (LUX)	Etixx–Quick-Step	+ 7' 57"
8	Andrey Amador (CRC)	Movistar Team	+ 8' 53"
9	Domenico Pozzovivo (ITA)	AG2R La Mondiale	+ 10' 05"
10	Kanstantsin Siutsou (BLR)	Team Dimension Data	+ 11' 03"

== Stage 17 ==
25 May 2016 — Molveno to Cassano d'Adda, 196 km (121.8 mi)

Result of Stage 17
Rank	Rider	Team	Time
1	Roger Kluge (GER)	IAM Cycling	4h 31' 29"
2	Giacomo Nizzolo (ITA)	Trek–Segafredo	s.t.
3	Nikias Arndt (GER)	Team Giant–Alpecin	s.t.
4	Sacha Modolo (ITA)	Lampre–Merida	s.t.
5	Matteo Trentin (ITA)	Etixx–Quick-Step	s.t.
6	Alexander Porsev (RUS)	Team Katusha	s.t.
7	Pim Ligthart (NED)	Lotto–Soudal	s.t.
8	Ramūnas Navardauskas (LTU)	Cannondale	s.t.
9	Manuel Belletti (ITA)	Vini Zabù	s.t.
10	Paolo Simion (ITA)	Bardiani–CSF	s.t.

General classification after Stage 17
Rank	Rider	Team	Time
1	Steven Kruijswijk (NED)	LottoNL–Jumbo	68h 11' 39"
2	Esteban Chaves (COL)	Orica–GreenEDGE	+ 3' 00"
3	Alejandro Valverde (ESP)	Movistar Team	+ 3' 23"
4	Vincenzo Nibali (ITA)	XDS Astana Team	+ 4' 43"
5	Ilnur Zakarin (RUS)	Team Katusha	+ 4' 50"
6	Rafał Majka (POL)	Tinkoff	+ 5' 34"
7	Bob Jungels (LUX)	Etixx–Quick-Step	+ 7' 57"
8	Andrey Amador (CRC)	Movistar Team	+ 8' 53"
9	Domenico Pozzovivo (ITA)	AG2R La Mondiale	+ 10' 05"
10	Kanstantsin Siutsou (BLR)	Team Dimension Data	+ 11' 03"

== Stage 18 ==
26 May 2016 — Muggiò to Pinerolo, 244 km (151.6 mi)

Result of Stage 18
Rank	Rider	Team	Time
1	Matteo Trentin (ITA)	Etixx–Quick-Step	5h 25' 34"
2	Moreno Moser (ITA)	Cannondale	s.t.
3	Gianluca Brambilla (ITA)	Etixx–Quick-Step	s.t.
4	Sacha Modolo (ITA)	Lampre–Merida	+ 20"
5	Nikias Arndt (GER)	Team Giant–Alpecin	+ 30"
6	Ivan Rovny (RUS)	Tinkoff	+ 34"
7	Matteo Busato (ITA)	Wilier Triestina–Southeast	+ 1' 10"
8	Christian Knees (GER)	Team Sky	+ 1' 16"
9	Axel Domont (FRA)	Decathlon CMA CGM Team	+ 1' 24"
10	Davide Malacarne (ITA)	Astana	+ 4' 28"

General classification after Stage 18
Rank	Rider	Team	Time
1	Steven Kruijswijk (NED)	LottoNL–Jumbo	73h 50' 37"
2	Esteban Chaves (COL)	Orica–GreenEDGE	+ 3' 00"
3	Alejandro Valverde (ESP)	Movistar Team	+ 3' 23"
4	Vincenzo Nibali (ITA)	XDS Astana Team	+ 4' 43"
5	Ilnur Zakarin (RUS)	Team Katusha	+ 4' 50"
6	Rafał Majka (POL)	Tinkoff	+ 5' 34"
7	Bob Jungels (LUX)	Etixx–Quick-Step	+ 7' 57"
8	Andrey Amador (CRC)	Movistar Team	+ 8' 53"
9	Domenico Pozzovivo (ITA)	AG2R La Mondiale	+ 10' 05"
10	Kanstantsin Siutsou (BLR)	Team Dimension Data	+ 11' 15"

== Stage 19 ==
27 May 2016 — Pinerolo to Risoul (France), 162 km (100.7 mi)

Result of Stage 19
Rank	Rider	Team	Time
1	Vincenzo Nibali (ITA)	Astana	4h 19' 54"
2	Mikel Nieve (ESP)	Team Sky	+ 51"
3	Esteban Chaves (COL)	Orica–GreenEDGE	+ 53"
4	Diego Ulissi (ITA)	Lampre–Merida	+ 1' 02"
5	Rafał Majka (POL)	Tinkoff	+ 2' 14"
6	Alejandro Valverde (ESP)	Movistar Team	+ 2' 14"
7	Rigoberto Urán (COL)	Cannondale	+ 2' 14"
8	Georg Preidler (AUT)	Team Giant–Alpecin	+ 2' 43"
9	Nicolas Roche (IRL)	Team Sky	+ 2' 51"
10	Hubert Dupont (FRA)	AG2R La Mondiale	+ 2' 51"

General classification after Stage 19
Rank	Rider	Team	Time
1	Esteban Chaves (COL)	Orica–GreenEDGE	78h 14' 20"
2	Vincenzo Nibali (ITA)	XDS Astana Team	+ 44"
3	Steven Kruijswijk (NED)	LottoNL–Jumbo	+ 1' 05"
4	Alejandro Valverde (ESP)	Movistar Team	+ 1' 48"
5	Rafał Majka (POL)	Tinkoff	+ 3' 59"
6	Bob Jungels (LUX)	Etixx–Quick-Step	+ 7' 53"
7	Andrey Amador (CRC)	Movistar Team	+ 9' 34"
8	Rigoberto Urán (COL)	Cannondale	+ 12' 18"
9	Kanstantsin Siutsou (BLR)	Team Dimension Data	+ 13' 19"
10	Domenico Pozzovivo (ITA)	AG2R La Mondiale	+ 14' 11"

== Stage 20 ==
28 May 2016 — Guillestre (France) to Sant'Anna di Vinadio, 134 km (83.3 mi)

Result of Stage 20
Rank	Rider	Team	Time
1	Rein Taaramäe (EST)	Team Katusha	4h 22' 43"
2	Darwin Atapuma (COL)	BMC Racing Team	+ 52"
3	Joe Dombrowski (USA)	Cannondale	+ 1' 17"
4	Mikel Nieve (ESP)	Team Sky	+ 4' 12"
5	Alexander Foliforov (RUS)	Gazprom–RusVelo	+ 4' 36"
6	Vincenzo Nibali (ITA)	Astana	+ 6' 44"
7	Alejandro Valverde (ESP)	Movistar Team	+ 6' 57"
8	Rigoberto Urán (COL)	Cannondale	+ 6' 57"
9	Giovanni Visconti (ITA)	Movistar Team	+ 7' 47"
10	Rafał Majka (POL)	Tinkoff	+ 8' 06"

General classification after Stage 20
Rank	Rider	Team	Time
1	Vincenzo Nibali (ITA)	XDS Astana Team	82h 44' 31"
2	Esteban Chaves (COL)	Orica–GreenEDGE	+ 52"
3	Alejandro Valverde (ESP)	Movistar Team	+ 1' 17"
4	Steven Kruijswijk (NED)	LottoNL–Jumbo	+ 1' 50"
5	Rafał Majka (POL)	Tinkoff	+ 4' 37"
6	Bob Jungels (LUX)	Etixx–Quick-Step	+ 8' 31"
7	Rigoberto Urán (COL)	Cannondale	+ 11' 47"
8	Andrey Amador (CRC)	Movistar Team	+ 13' 21"
9	Darwin Atapuma (COL)	BMC Racing Team	+ 14' 09"
10	Kanstantsin Siutsou (BLR)	Team Dimension Data	+ 16' 20"

== Stage 21 ==
29 May 2016 — Cuneo to Turin, 163 km (101.3 mi)

Result of Stage 21
Rank	Rider	Team	Time
1	Nikias Arndt (GER)	Team Giant–Alpecin	3h 48' 18"
2	Matteo Trentin (ITA)	Etixx–Quick-Step	s.t.
3	Sacha Modolo (ITA)	Lampre–Merida	s.t.
4	Alexander Porsev (RUS)	Team Katusha	s.t.
5	Sean De Bie (BEL)	Lotto–Soudal	s.t.
6	Ivan Savitskiy (RUS)	Gazprom–RusVelo	s.t.
7	Rick Zabel (GER)	BMC Racing Team	s.t.
8	Eduard-Michael Grosu (ROU)	Nippo–Vini Fantini	s.t.
9	Jay McCarthy (AUS)	Tinkoff	s.t.
10	Alberto Bettiol (ITA)	Cannondale	s.t.

General classification after Stage 21
Rank	Rider	Team	Time
1	Vincenzo Nibali (ITA)	XDS Astana Team	86h 32' 49"
2	Esteban Chaves (COL)	Orica–GreenEDGE	+ 52"
3	Alejandro Valverde (ESP)	Movistar Team	+ 1' 17"
4	Steven Kruijswijk (NED)	LottoNL–Jumbo	+ 1' 50"
5	Rafał Majka (POL)	Tinkoff	+ 4' 37"
6	Bob Jungels (LUX)	Etixx–Quick-Step	+ 8' 31"
7	Rigoberto Urán (COL)	Cannondale	+ 11' 47"
8	Andrey Amador (CRC)	Movistar Team	+ 13' 21"
9	Darwin Atapuma (COL)	BMC Racing Team	+ 14' 09"
10	Kanstantsin Siutsou (BLR)	Team Dimension Data	+ 16' 20"
