= 2016 Giro d'Italia, Stage 1 to Stage 11 =

Cycling race stages

The 2016 Giro d'Italia began on 6 May, and stage 11 occurred on 18 May. The race began with a time trial in Apeldoorn in the Netherlands.

Legend
A pink jersey	Denotes the leader of the General classification	A blue jersey	Denotes the leader of the Mountains classification
A red jersey	Denotes the leader of the Points classification	A white jersey	Denotes the leader of the Young rider classification

== Stage 1 ==
6 May 2016 — Apeldoorn (Netherlands), 9.8 km (6.1 mi), individual time trial (ITT)

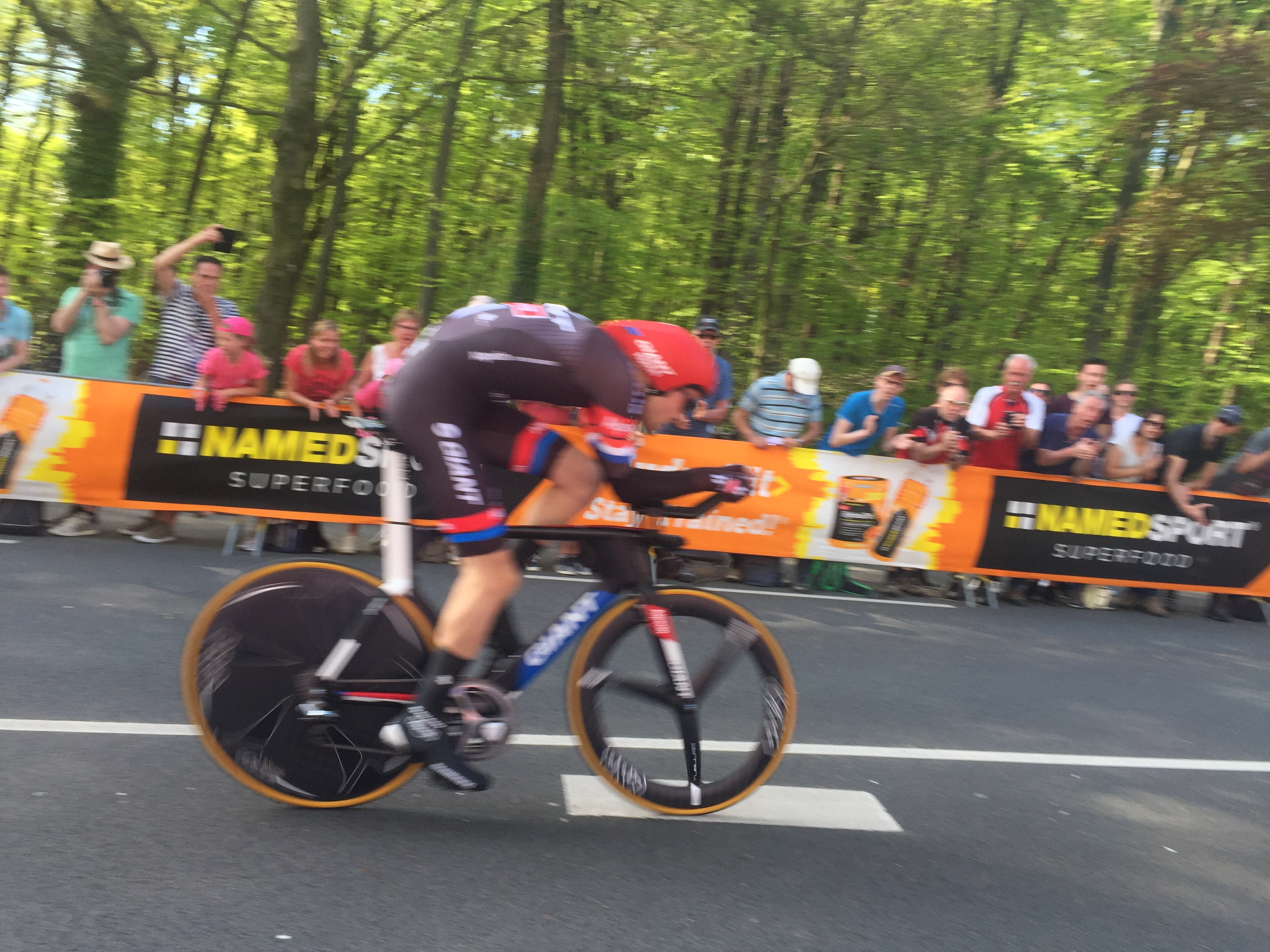
Tom Dumoulin of Team Giant–Alpecin won the first stage of the race and became the first leader.

Stage 1 result and general classification after stage 1
Rank	Rider	Team	Time
1	Tom Dumoulin (NED)	Team Giant–Alpecin	11' 03"
2	Primož Roglič (SLO)	LottoNL–Jumbo	s.t.
3	Andrey Amador (CRC)	Movistar Team	+ 6"
4	Tobias Ludvigsson (SWE)	Team Giant–Alpecin	+ 8"
5	Marcel Kittel (GER)	Etixx–Quick-Step	+ 11"
6	Moreno Moser (ITA)	Cannondale	+ 12"
7	Bob Jungels (LUX)	Etixx–Quick-Step	+ 13"
8	Fabian Cancellara (SUI)	Trek–Segafredo	+ 14"
9	Matthias Brändle (AUT)	IAM Cycling	+ 14"
10	Silvan Dillier (SUI)	BMC Racing Team	+ 16"

== Stage 2 ==
7 May 2016 — Arnhem (Netherlands) to Nijmegen (Netherlands), 190 km (118.1 mi)

Result of Stage 2
Rank	Rider	Team	Time
1	Marcel Kittel (GER)	Etixx–Quick-Step	4h 38' 31"
2	Arnaud Démare (FRA)	FDJ	s.t.
3	Sacha Modolo (ITA)	Lampre–Merida	s.t.
4	Moreno Hofland (NED)	LottoNL–Jumbo	s.t.
5	Nicola Ruffoni (ITA)	Bardiani–CSF	s.t.
6	Alexander Porsev (RUS)	Team Katusha	s.t.
7	Caleb Ewan (AUS)	Orica–GreenEDGE	s.t.
8	Kristian Sbaragli (ITA)	Team Dimension Data	s.t.
9	Andrey Amador (CRC)	Movistar Team	s.t.
10	Giacomo Nizzolo (ITA)	Trek–Segafredo	s.t.

General classification after Stage 2
Rank	Rider	Team	Time
1	Tom Dumoulin (NED)	Team Giant–Alpecin	4h 49' 34"
2	Primož Roglič (SLO)	LottoNL–Jumbo	+ 0"
3	Marcel Kittel (GER)	Etixx–Quick-Step	+ 1"
4	Andrey Amador (CRC)	Movistar Team	+ 6"
5	Tobias Ludvigsson (SWE)	Team Giant–Alpecin	+ 8"
6	Moreno Moser (ITA)	Cannondale	+ 12"
7	Bob Jungels (LUX)	Etixx–Quick-Step	+ 13"
8	Matthias Brändle (AUT)	IAM Cycling	+ 14"
9	Silvan Dillier (SUI)	BMC Racing Team	+ 16"
10	Roger Kluge (GER)	IAM Cycling	+ 16"

== Stage 3 ==
8 May 2016 — Nijmegen (Netherlands) to Arnhem (Netherlands), 190 km (118.1 mi)

Result of Stage 3
Rank	Rider	Team	Time
1	Marcel Kittel (GER)	Etixx–Quick-Step	4h 23' 45"
2	Elia Viviani (ITA)	Team Sky	s.t.
3	Giacomo Nizzolo (ITA)	Trek–Segafredo	s.t.
4	André Greipel (GER)	Lotto–Soudal	s.t.
5	Alexander Porsev (RUS)	Team Katusha	s.t.
6	Kristian Sbaragli (ITA)	Team Dimension Data	s.t.
7	Moreno Hofland (NED)	LottoNL–Jumbo	s.t.
8	Arnaud Démare (FRA)	FDJ	s.t.
9	Rick Zabel (GER)	BMC Racing Team	s.t.
10	Matej Mohorič (SLO)	Lampre–Merida	s.t.

General classification after Stage 3
Rank	Rider	Team	Time
1	Marcel Kittel (GER)	Etixx–Quick-Step	9h 13' 10"
2	Tom Dumoulin (NED)	Team Giant–Alpecin	+ 9"
3	Andrey Amador (CRC)	Movistar Team	+ 15"
4	Tobias Ludvigsson (SWE)	Team Giant–Alpecin	+ 17"
5	Moreno Moser (ITA)	Cannondale	+ 21"
6	Bob Jungels (LUX)	Etixx–Quick-Step	+ 22"
7	Matthias Brändle (AUT)	IAM Cycling	+ 23"
8	Roger Kluge (GER)	IAM Cycling	+ 25"
9	Chad Haga (USA)	Team Giant–Alpecin	+ 25"
10	Georg Preidler (AUT)	Team Giant–Alpecin	+ 26"

== Stage 4 ==
10 May 2016 — Catanzaro to Praia a Mare, 200 km (124.3 mi)

Result of Stage 4
Rank	Rider	Team	Time
1	Diego Ulissi (ITA)	Lampre–Merida	4h 46' 51"
2	Tom Dumoulin (NED)	Team Giant–Alpecin	+ 5"
3	Steven Kruijswijk (NED)	LottoNL–Jumbo	+ 5"
4	Alejandro Valverde (ESP)	Movistar Team	+ 6"
5	Gianluca Brambilla (ITA)	Etixx–Quick-Step	+ 6"
6	Vincenzo Nibali (ITA)	Astana	+ 6"
7	Ilnur Zakarin (RUS)	Team Katusha	+ 6"
8	Matteo Busato (ITA)	Wilier Triestina–Southeast	+ 6"
9	Esteban Chaves (COL)	Orica–GreenEDGE	+ 6"
10	Nicolas Roche (IRL)	Team Sky	+ 6"

General classification after Stage 4
Rank	Rider	Team	Time
1	Tom Dumoulin (NED)	Team Giant–Alpecin	14h 00' 09"
2	Bob Jungels (LUX)	Etixx–Quick-Step	+ 20"
3	Diego Ulissi (ITA)	Lampre–Merida	+ 20"
4	Steven Kruijswijk (NED)	LottoNL–Jumbo	+ 24"
5	Georg Preidler (AUT)	Team Giant–Alpecin	+ 24"
6	Vincenzo Nibali (ITA)	XDS Astana Team	+ 26"
7	Alejandro Valverde (ESP)	Movistar Team	+ 31"
8	Jakob Fuglsang (DEN)	Astana	+ 35"
9	Nicolas Roche (IRL)	Team Sky	+ 37"
10	Esteban Chaves (COL)	Orica–GreenEDGE	+ 37"

== Stage 5 ==
11 May 2016 — Praia a Mare to Benevento, 233 km (144.8 mi)

Result of Stage 5
Rank	Rider	Team	Time
1	André Greipel (GER)	Lotto–Soudal	5h 40' 35"
2	Arnaud Démare (FRA)	FDJ	s.t.
3	Sonny Colbrelli (ITA)	Bardiani–CSF	s.t.
4	Bob Jungels (LUX)	Etixx–Quick-Step	s.t.
5	Moreno Hofland (NED)	LottoNL–Jumbo	s.t.
6	Manuel Belletti (ITA)	Wilier Triestina–Southeast	s.t.
7	Rick Zabel (GER)	BMC Racing Team	s.t.
8	Georg Preidler (AUT)	Team Giant–Alpecin	s.t.
9	Caleb Ewan (AUS)	Orica–GreenEDGE	s.t.
10	Alexei Tsatevich (RUS)	Team Katusha	s.t.

General classification after Stage 5
Rank	Rider	Team	Time
1	Tom Dumoulin (NED)	Team Giant–Alpecin	19h 40' 48"
2	Bob Jungels (LUX)	Etixx–Quick-Step	+ 16"
3	Diego Ulissi (ITA)	Lampre–Merida	+ 20"
4	Georg Preidler (AUT)	Team Giant–Alpecin	+ 20"
5	Steven Kruijswijk (NED)	LottoNL–Jumbo	+ 24"
6	Vincenzo Nibali (ITA)	XDS Astana Team	+ 26"
7	Alejandro Valverde (ESP)	Movistar Team	+ 27"
8	Ilnur Zakarin (RUS)	Team Katusha	+ 35"
9	Jakob Fuglsang (DEN)	Astana	+ 35"
10	Nicolas Roche (IRL)	Team Sky	+ 37"

== Stage 6 ==
12 May 2016 — Ponte to Roccaraso, 157 km (97.6 mi)

Result of Stage 6
Rank	Rider	Team	Time
1	Tim Wellens (BEL)	Lotto–Soudal	4h 40' 05"
2	Jakob Fuglsang (DEN)	Astana	+ 1' 19"
3	Ilnur Zakarin (RUS)	Team Katusha	+ 1' 19"
4	Tom Dumoulin (NED)	Team Giant–Alpecin	+ 1' 22"
5	Kanstantsin Siutsou (BLR)	Team Dimension Data	+ 1' 24"
6	Domenico Pozzovivo (ITA)	AG2R La Mondiale	+ 1' 24"
7	Esteban Chaves (COL)	Orica–GreenEDGE	+ 1' 29"
8	Rigoberto Urán (COL)	Cannondale	+ 1' 33"
9	Rafał Majka (POL)	Tinkoff	+ 1' 33"
10	Alejandro Valverde (ESP)	Movistar Team	+ 1' 36"

General classification after Stage 6
Rank	Rider	Team	Time
1	Tom Dumoulin (NED)	Team Giant–Alpecin	24h 22' 15"
2	Jakob Fuglsang (DEN)	Astana	+ 26"
3	Ilnur Zakarin (RUS)	Team Katusha	+ 28"
4	Bob Jungels (LUX)	Etixx–Quick-Step	+ 35"
5	Steven Kruijswijk (NED)	LottoNL–Jumbo	+ 38"
6	Alejandro Valverde (ESP)	Movistar Team	+ 41"
7	Diego Ulissi (ITA)	Lampre–Merida	+ 41"
8	Esteban Chaves (COL)	Orica–GreenEDGE	+ 44"
9	Vincenzo Nibali (ITA)	XDS Astana Team	+ 47"
10	Kanstantsin Siutsou (BLR)	Team Dimension Data	+ 49"

== Stage 7 ==
13 May 2016 — Sulmona to Foligno, 211 km (131.1 mi)

Result of Stage 7
Rank	Rider	Team	Time
1	André Greipel (GER)	Lotto–Soudal	5h 01' 08"
2	Giacomo Nizzolo (ITA)	Trek–Segafredo	s.t.
3	Sacha Modolo (ITA)	Lampre–Merida	s.t.
4	Caleb Ewan (AUS)	Orica–GreenEDGE	s.t.
5	Enrico Battaglin (ITA)	LottoNL–Jumbo	s.t.
6	Matteo Trentin (ITA)	Etixx–Quick-Step	s.t.
7	Alexander Porsev (RUS)	Team Katusha	s.t.
8	Alexei Tsatevich (RUS)	Team Katusha–Alpecin	s.t.
9	Nicola Ruffoni (ITA)	Bardiani–CSF	s.t.
10	Elia Viviani (ITA)	Team Sky	s.t.

General classification after Stage 7
Rank	Rider	Team	Time
1	Tom Dumoulin (NED)	Team Giant–Alpecin	29h 23' 23"
2	Jakob Fuglsang (DEN)	Astana	+ 26"
3	Ilnur Zakarin (RUS)	Team Katusha	+ 28"
4	Bob Jungels (LUX)	Etixx–Quick-Step	+ 35"
5	Steven Kruijswijk (NED)	LottoNL–Jumbo	+ 38"
6	Alejandro Valverde (ESP)	Movistar Team	+ 41"
7	Diego Ulissi (ITA)	Lampre–Merida	+ 41"
8	Vincenzo Nibali (ITA)	XDS Astana Team	+ 47"
9	Kanstantsin Siutsou (BLR)	Team Dimension Data	+ 49"
10	Rigoberto Urán (COL)	Cannondale	+ 51"

== Stage 8 ==
14 May 2016 — Foligno to Arezzo, 186 km (115.6 mi)

Result of Stage 8
Rank	Rider	Team	Time
1	Gianluca Brambilla (ITA)	Etixx–Quick-Step	4h 14' 05"
2	Matteo Montaguti (ITA)	AG2R La Mondiale	+ 1' 06"
3	Moreno Moser (ITA)	Cannondale	+ 1' 27"
4	Jaco Venter (RSA)	Team Dimension Data	+ 1' 28"
5	Alessandro De Marchi (ITA)	BMC Racing Team	+ 1' 33"
6	Alejandro Valverde (ESP)	Movistar Team	+ 1' 41"
7	Steven Kruijswijk (NED)	LottoNL–Jumbo	+ 1' 41"
8	Mikel Landa (ESP)	Team Sky	+ 1' 41"
9	Esteban Chaves (COL)	Orica–GreenEDGE	+ 1' 41"
10	Ilnur Zakarin (RUS)	Team Katusha	+ 1' 41"

General classification after Stage 8
Rank	Rider	Team	Time
1	Gianluca Brambilla (ITA)	Etixx–Quick-Step	33h 39' 14"
2	Ilnur Zakarin (RUS)	Team Katusha	+ 23"
3	Steven Kruijswijk (NED)	LottoNL–Jumbo	+ 33"
4	Alejandro Valverde (ESP)	Movistar Team	+ 36"
5	Vincenzo Nibali (ITA)	XDS Astana Team	+ 45"
6	Esteban Chaves (COL)	Orica–GreenEDGE	+ 48"
7	Rigoberto Urán (COL)	Cannondale	+ 49"
8	Rafał Majka (POL)	Tinkoff	+ 54"
9	Domenico Pozzovivo (ITA)	AG2R La Mondiale	+ 54"
10	Mikel Landa (ESP)	Team Sky	+ 1' 03"

== Stage 9 ==
15 May 2016 — Chianti Classico Stage — Radda in Chianti to Greve in Chianti, 40.5 km (25.2 mi) individual time trial (ITT)

Result of Stage 9
Rank	Rider	Team	Time
1	Primož Roglič (SLO)	LottoNL–Jumbo	51' 45"
2	Matthias Brändle (AUT)	IAM Cycling	+ 10"
3	Vegard Laengen (NOR)	IAM Cycling	+ 17"
4	Fabian Cancellara (SUI)	Trek–Segafredo	+ 28"
5	Anton Vorobyev (RUS)	Team Katusha	+ 30"
6	Bob Jungels (LUX)	Etixx–Quick-Step	+ 45"
7	Stefan Kung (SUI)	BMC Racing Team	+ 58"
8	Jos van Emden (NED)	LottoNL–Jumbo	+ 1' 08"
9	Maarten Tjallingii (NED)	LottoNL–Jumbo	+ 1' 16"
10	Andrey Amador (CRC)	Movistar Team	+ 1' 19"

General classification after Stage 9
Rank	Rider	Team	Time
1	Gianluca Brambilla (ITA)	Etixx–Quick-Step	34h 33' 04"
2	Bob Jungels (LUX)	Etixx–Quick-Step	+ 1"
3	Andrey Amador (CRC)	Movistar Team	+ 32"
4	Steven Kruijswijk (NED)	LottoNL–Jumbo	+ 51"
5	Vincenzo Nibali (ITA)	XDS Astana Team	+ 53"
6	Alejandro Valverde (ESP)	Movistar Team	+ 55"
7	Tom Dumoulin (NED)	Team Giant–Alpecin	+ 58"
8	Mikel Landa (ESP)	Team Sky	+ 1' 18"
9	Rafał Majka (POL)	Tinkoff	+ 1' 45"
10	Jakob Fuglsang (DEN)	Astana	+ 1' 51"

== Stage 10 ==
17 May 2016 — Campi Bisenzio to Sestola, 219 km (136.1 mi)

Result of Stage 10
Rank	Rider	Team	Time
1	Giulio Ciccone (ITA)	Bardiani–CSF	5h 44' 32"
2	Ivan Rovny (RUS)	Tinkoff	+ 42"
3	Darwin Atapuma (COL)	BMC Racing Team	+ 1' 20"
4	Nathan Brown (USA)	Cannondale	+ 1' 53"
5	Damiano Cunego (ITA)	Nippo–Vini Fantini	+ 2' 04"
6	Andrey Amador (CRC)	Movistar Team	+ 2' 10"
7	Giovanni Visconti (ITA)	Movistar Team	+ 2' 11"
8	Alejandro Valverde (ESP)	Movistar Team	+ 2' 11"
9	Esteban Chaves (COL)	Orica–GreenEDGE	+ 2' 11"
10	Jakob Fuglsang (DEN)	Astana	+ 2' 11"

General classification after Stage 10
Rank	Rider	Team	Time
1	Bob Jungels (LUX)	Etixx–Quick-Step	40h 19' 52"
2	Andrey Amador (CRC)	Movistar Team	+ 26"
3	Alejandro Valverde (ESP)	Movistar Team	+ 50"
4	Steven Kruijswijk (NED)	LottoNL–Jumbo	+ 50"
5	Vincenzo Nibali (ITA)	XDS Astana Team	+ 52"
6	Gianluca Brambilla (ITA)	Etixx–Quick-Step	+ 1' 11"
7	Rafał Majka (POL)	Tinkoff	+ 1' 44"
8	Jakob Fuglsang (DEN)	Astana	+ 1' 46"
9	Ilnur Zakarin (RUS)	Team Katusha	+ 2' 08"
10	Esteban Chaves (COL)	Orica–GreenEDGE	+ 2' 26"

== Stage 11 ==
18 May 2016 — Modena to Asolo, 227 km (141.1 mi)

Result of Stage 11
Rank	Rider	Team	Time
1	Diego Ulissi (ITA)	Lampre–Merida	4h 56' 32"
2	Andrey Amador (CRC)	Movistar Team	s.t.
3	Bob Jungels (LUX)	Etixx–Quick-Step	s.t.
4	Giacomo Nizzolo (ITA)	Trek–Segafredo	+ 13"
5	Sonny Colbrelli (ITA)	Bardiani–CSF	+ 13"
6	Matteo Trentin (ITA)	Etixx–Quick-Step	+ 13"
7	Sacha Modolo (ITA)	Lampre–Merida	+ 13"
8	Enrico Battaglin (ITA)	LottoNL–Jumbo	+ 13"
9	Tim Wellens (BEL)	Lotto–Soudal	+ 13"
10	Alejandro Valverde (ESP)	Movistar Team	+ 13"

General classification after Stage 11
Rank	Rider	Team	Time
1	Bob Jungels (LUX)	Etixx–Quick-Step	45h 16' 20"
2	Andrey Amador (CRC)	Movistar Team	+ 24"
3	Alejandro Valverde (ESP)	Movistar Team	+ 1' 07"
4	Steven Kruijswijk (NED)	LottoNL–Jumbo	+ 1' 07"
5	Vincenzo Nibali (ITA)	XDS Astana Team	+ 1' 09"
6	Rafał Majka (POL)	Tinkoff	+ 2' 01"
7	Ilnur Zakarin (RUS)	Team Katusha	+ 2' 25"
8	Esteban Chaves (COL)	Orica–GreenEDGE	+ 2' 43"
9	Gianluca Brambilla (ITA)	Etixx–Quick-Step	+ 2' 45"
10	Diego Ulissi (ITA)	Lampre–Merida	+ 2' 47"
