= 2018 Vuelta a Andalucía =

Race details
- Dates: 14–18 February 2018
- Stages: 5
- Distance: 712.6 km (442.8 mi)
- Winning time: 17h 41' 50"

Results
Jersey awarded to the overall winner	Winner	Tim Wellens (BEL)	(Lotto–Soudal)
	Second	Wout Poels (NED)	(Team Sky)
	Third	Marc Soler (ESP)	(Movistar Team)
Jersey awarded to the points classification winner	Points	Wout Poels (NED)	(Team Sky)
Jersey awarded to the mountains classification winner	Mountains	Lluís Mas (ESP)	(Caja Rural–Seguros RGA)
Jersey awarded to the sprints classification winner	Sprints	Aaron Verwilst (BEL)	(Sport Vlaanderen–Baloise)

The 2018 Vuelta a Andalucía was the 64th edition of the Vuelta a Andalucía cycle race and was held on 14 February to 18 February 2018. The race started in Mijas and finished in Barbate. The race was won by Tim Wellens.

== Teams ==
Twenty two teams entered the race. Each team had a maximum of seven riders:

UCI WorldTeams

- AG2R La Mondiale
- EF Education First–Drapac p/b Cannondale
- Lotto–Soudal
- Team Sky
- Astana
- LottoNL–Jumbo
- Movistar Team

UCI Professional Continental teams

- Burgos BH
- CCC–Sprandi–Polkowice
- Direct Énergie
- Gazprom–RusVelo
- Nippo–Vini Fantini–Europa Ovini
- Roompot–Nederlandse Loterij
- Vérandas Willems–Crelan
- Caja Rural–Seguros RGA
- Delko–Marseille Provence KTM
- Euskadi–Murias
- Israel Cycling Academy
- Rally Cycling
- Sport Vlaanderen–Baloise
- Wanty–Groupe Gobert

UCI Continental team

- Fundación Euskadi

== General classification ==
Final general classification

Rank	Rider	Time
1	Tim Wellens (BEL)	17h 41' 50"
2	Wout Poels (NED)	+ 8"
3	Marc Soler (ESP)	+ 27"
4	Jakob Fuglsang (DEN)	+ 30"
5	Luis León Sánchez (ESP)	+ 30"
6	Mikel Landa (ESP)	+ 42"
7	Steven Kruijswijk (NED)	+ 1' 19"
8	Simon Clarke (AUS)	+ 1' 41"
9	Andrey Amador (CRI)	+ 1' 51"
10	Chris Froome (GBR)	+ 1' 57"
