= 2019 Vuelta a Andalucía =

2019 UCI Europe Tour

Race details
- Dates: 20–24 February 2019
- Stages: 5
- Distance: 687.1 km (426.9 mi)
- Winning time: 17h 42' 00"

Results
Jersey awarded to the overall winner	Winner	Jakob Fuglsang (DEN)	(Astana)
	Second	Ion Izagirre (ESP)	(Astana)
	Third	Steven Kruijswijk (NED)	(Team Jumbo–Visma)
Jersey awarded to the points classification winner	Points	Tim Wellens (BEL)	(Lotto–Soudal)
Jersey awarded to the mountains classification winner	Mountains	Simon Yates (GBR)	(Mitchelton–Scott)
	Team	Astana	

2019 Vuelta a Andalucía was the 65th edition of the Vuelta a Andalucía road cycling race. It was held from 20 to 24 February 2019 as a 2.HC event on the 2019 UCI Europe Tour.

== Teams ==
Nineteen teams started the race. Each team had a maximum of seven riders:

UCI WorldTeams

- Movistar Team
- Mitchelton–Scott
- Astana
- Lotto–Soudal
- Bahrain–Merida
- Team Jumbo–Visma

UCI Professional Continental teams

- Caja Rural–Seguros RGA
- Sport Vlaanderen–Baloise
- Euskadi–Murias
- Burgos BH
- Rally UHC Cycling
- Bardiani–CSF
- Vital Concept–B&B Hotels
- Roompot–Charles
- Wanty–Gobert
- Androni Giocattoli–Sidermec
- Gazprom–RusVelo
- Nippo–Vini Fantini–Faizanè

UCI Continental teams

- Fundación Euskadi

== Route ==
Stage characteristics and winners
Stage	Date	Course	Distance	Type	Stage winner
1	20 February	Sanlúcar de Barrameda to Alcalá de los Gazules	170.5 km (105.9 mi)	Medium mountain stage	Tim Wellens (BEL)
2	21 February	Seville to Torredonjimeno	216.5 km (134.5 mi)	Hilly stage	Matteo Trentin (ITA)
3	22 February	Mancha Real to La Guardia de Jaén	16.3 km (10.1 mi)	Individual time trial	Tim Wellens (BEL)
4	23 February	Armilla to Granada	119.9 km (74.5 mi)	Mountain stage	Simon Yates (GBR)
5	24 February	Villa de Otura to Alhaurín de la Torre	163.9 km (101.8 mi)	Medium mountain stage	Matteo Trentin (ITA)

== Stages ==
=== Stage 1 ===
Stage 1 result

Rank	Rider	Team	Time
1	Tim Wellens (BEL)	Lotto–Soudal	4h 24' 12"
2	Jakob Fuglsang (DEN)	Astana	+ 5"
3	Ion Izagirre (ESP)	Astana	s.t.
4	Jack Haig (AUS)	Mitchelton–Scott	s.t.
5	Steven Kruijswijk (NED)	Team Jumbo–Visma	+ 9"
6	Pello Bilbao (ESP)	Astana	s.t.
7	Marco Canola (ITA)	Nippo–Vini Fantini–Faizanè	s.t.
8	Aleksandr Vlasov (RUS)	Gazprom–RusVelo	s.t.
9	Antwan Tolhoek (NED)	Team Jumbo–Visma	s.t.
10	Guillaume Martin (FRA)	Wanty–Gobert	+ 13"

General classification after Stage 1

Rank	Rider	Team	Time
1	Tim Wellens (BEL)	Lotto–Soudal	4h 24' 12"
2	Jakob Fuglsang (DEN)	Astana	+ 5"
3	Ion Izagirre (ESP)	Astana	s.t.
4	Jack Haig (AUS)	Mitchelton–Scott	s.t.
5	Steven Kruijswijk (NED)	Team Jumbo–Visma	+ 9"
6	Pello Bilbao (ESP)	Astana	s.t.
7	Marco Canola (ITA)	Nippo–Vini Fantini–Faizanè	s.t.
8	Aleksandr Vlasov (RUS)	Gazprom–RusVelo	s.t.
9	Antwan Tolhoek (NED)	Team Jumbo–Visma	s.t.
10	Guillaume Martin (FRA)	Wanty–Gobert	+ 13"

=== Stage 2 ===
Stage 2 result

Rank	Rider	Team	Time
1	Matteo Trentin (ITA)	Mitchelton–Scott	5h 55' 28"
2	Danny van Poppel (NED)	Team Jumbo–Visma	s.t.
3	Iván García (ESP)	Bahrain–Merida	s.t.
4	Enrique Sanz (ESP)	Euskadi–Murias	s.t.
5	Manuel Belletti (ITA)	Androni Giocattoli–Sidermec	s.t.
6	Andrea Pasqualon (ITA)	Wanty–Gobert	s.t.
7	Jonas van Genechten (BEL)	Vital Concept–B&B Hotels	s.t.
8	Edward Planckaert (BEL)	Sport Vlaanderen–Baloise	s.t.
9	Michael Van Staeyen (BEL)	Roompot–Charles	s.t.
10	Vincenzo Albanese (ITA)	Bardiani–CSF	s.t.

General classification after Stage 2

Rank	Rider	Team	Time
1	Tim Wellens (BEL)	Lotto–Soudal	10h 19' 40"
2	Jakob Fuglsang (DEN)	Astana	+ 5"
3	Jack Haig (AUS)	Mitchelton–Scott	s.t.
4	Ion Izagirre (ESP)	Astana	s.t.
5	Marco Canola (ITA)	Nippo–Vini Fantini–Faizanè	+ 9"
6	Steven Kruijswijk (NED)	Team Jumbo–Visma	s.t.
7	Aleksandr Vlasov (RUS)	Gazprom–RusVelo	s.t.
8	Pello Bilbao (ESP)	Astana	s.t.
9	Antwan Tolhoek (NED)	Team Jumbo–Visma	s.t.
10	Guillaume Martin (FRA)	Wanty–Gobert	+ 13"

=== Stage 3 ===
Stage 3 result

Rank	Rider	Team	Time
1	Tim Wellens (BEL)	Lotto–Soudal	22' 25"
2	Jakob Fuglsang (DEN)	Astana	+ 2"
3	Ion Izagirre (ESP)	Astana	+ 9"
4	Steven Kruijswijk (NED)	Team Jumbo–Visma	s.t.
5	Adam Yates (GBR)	Mitchelton–Scott	+ 14"
6	Jack Haig (AUS)	Mitchelton–Scott	+ 16"
7	Pello Bilbao (ESP)	Astana	+ 19"
8	Simon Yates (GBR)	Mitchelton–Scott	+ 21"
9	Matej Mohorič (SLO)	Bahrain–Merida	+ 25"
10	Aleksandr Vlasov (RUS)	Gazprom–RusVelo	+ 47"

General classification after Stage 3

Rank	Rider	Team	Time
1	Tim Wellens (BEL)	Lotto–Soudal	10h 42' 05"
2	Jakob Fuglsang (DEN)	Astana	+ 7"
3	Ion Izagirre (ESP)	Astana	+ 14"
4	Steven Kruijswijk (NED)	Team Jumbo–Visma	+ 18"
5	Jack Haig (AUS)	Mitchelton–Scott	+ 21"
6	Pello Bilbao (ESP)	Astana	+ 28"
7	Matej Mohorič (SLO)	Bahrain–Merida	+ 39"
8	Aleksandr Vlasov (RUS)	Gazprom–RusVelo	+ 56"
9	Adam Yates (GBR)	Mitchelton–Scott	+ 1' 04"
10	Óscar Rodríguez (ESP)	Euskadi–Murias	+ 1' 16"

=== Stage 4 ===
Stage 4 result

Rank	Rider	Team	Time
1	Simon Yates (GBR)	Mitchelton–Scott	3h 01' 03"
2	Sergio Higuita (COL)	Fundación Euskadi	+ 26"
3	Steven Kruijswijk (NED)	Team Jumbo–Visma	s.t.
4	Adam Yates (GBR)	Mitchelton–Scott	s.t.
5	Ion Izagirre (ESP)	Astana	s.t.
6	Pello Bilbao (ESP)	Astana	s.t.
7	Jakob Fuglsang (DEN)	Astana	s.t.
8	Aleksandr Vlasov (RUS)	Gazprom–RusVelo	+ 1' 20"
9	Jack Haig (AUS)	Mitchelton–Scott	s.t.
10	Héctor Carretero (ESP)	Movistar Team	+ 2' 51"

General classification after Stage 4

Rank	Rider	Team	Time
1	Jakob Fuglsang (DEN)	Astana	13h 43' 41"
2	Ion Izagirre (ESP)	Astana	+ 7"
3	Steven Kruijswijk (NED)	Team Jumbo–Visma	+ 11"
4	Pello Bilbao (ESP)	Astana	+ 21"
5	Adam Yates (GBR)	Mitchelton–Scott	+ 57"
6	Jack Haig (AUS)	Mitchelton–Scott	+ 1' 08"
7	Sergio Higuita (COL)	Fundación Euskadi	+ 1' 12"
8	Aleksandr Vlasov (RUS)	Gazprom–RusVelo	+ 1' 43"
9	Tim Wellens (BEL)	Lotto–Soudal	+ 2' 53"
10	Dylan Teuns (BEL)	Bahrain–Merida	+ 3' 41"

=== Stage 5 ===
Stage 5 result

Rank	Rider	Team	Time
1	Matteo Trentin (ITA)	Mitchelton–Scott	3h 58' 19"
2	Enrique Sanz (ESP)	Euskadi–Murias	s.t.
3	Carlos Barbero (ESP)	Movistar Team	s.t.
4	Tosh Van der Sande (BEL)	Lotto–Soudal	s.t.
5	Colin Joyce (USA)	Rally UHC Cycling	s.t.
6	Matej Mohorič (SLO)	Bahrain–Merida	s.t.
7	Juan José Lobato (ESP)	Nippo–Vini Fantini–Faizanè	s.t.
8	Lars Boom (NED)	Roompot–Charles	s.t.
9	Eduard Prades (ESP)	Movistar Team	s.t.
10	Steven Kruijswijk (NED)	Team Jumbo–Visma	s.t.

== Classifications ==
Final general classification

Rank	Rider	Team	Time
1	Jakob Fuglsang (DEN)	Astana	17h 42' 00"
2	Ion Izagirre (ESP)	Astana	+ 7"
3	Steven Kruijswijk (NED)	Team Jumbo–Visma	+ 11"
4	Pello Bilbao (ESP)	Astana	+ 21"
5	Adam Yates (GBR)	Mitchelton–Scott	+ 57"
6	Jack Haig (AUS)	Mitchelton–Scott	+ 1' 08"
7	Sergio Higuita (COL)	Fundación Euskadi	+ 1' 12"
8	Aleksandr Vlasov (RUS)	Gazprom–RusVelo	+ 1' 43"
9	Tim Wellens (BEL)	Lotto–Soudal	+ 2' 53"
10	Dylan Teuns (BEL)	Bahrain–Merida	+ 3' 41"

Final mountains classification

Rank	Rider	Team	Points
1	Simon Yates (GBR)	Mitchelton–Scott	34
2	Álvaro Cuadros (ESP)	Caja Rural–Seguros RGA	15
3	Ion Izagirre (ESP)	Astana	12
4	Jakob Fuglsang (DEN)	Astana	8
5	Dario Cataldo (ITA)	Astana	8
6	Antwan Tolhoek (NED)	Team Jumbo–Visma	7
7	Luis León Sánchez (ESP)	Astana	6
8	Tomasz Marczyński (POL)	Lotto–Soudal	6
9	Sergio Samitier (ESP)	Euskadi–Murias	5
10	Adam Yates (GBR)	Mitchelton–Scott	5

Final points classification

Rank	Rider	Team	Points
1	Tim Wellens (BEL)	Lotto–Soudal	53
2	Matteo Trentin (ITA)	Mitchelton–Scott	50
3	Jakob Fuglsang (DEN)}	Astana	49
4	Steven Kruijswijk (NED)	Team Jumbo–Visma	48
5	Ion Izagirre (ESP)	Astana	47
6	Enrique Sanz (ESP)	Euskadi–Murias	34
7	Simon Yates (GBR)	Mitchelton–Scott	33
8	Jack Haig (AUS)	Mitchelton–Scott	31
9	Pello Bilbao (ESP)	Astana	29
10	Adam Yates (GBR)	Mitchelton–Scott	26

Final teams classification

Rank	Team	Time
1	Astana	53h 06' 28"
2	Mitchelton–Scott	+ 2' 02"
3	Movistar Team	+ 12' 14"
4	Team Jumbo–Visma	+ 16' 25"
5	Gazprom–RusVelo	+ 16' 56"
