= Andrey Amador =

Costa Rican road cyclist

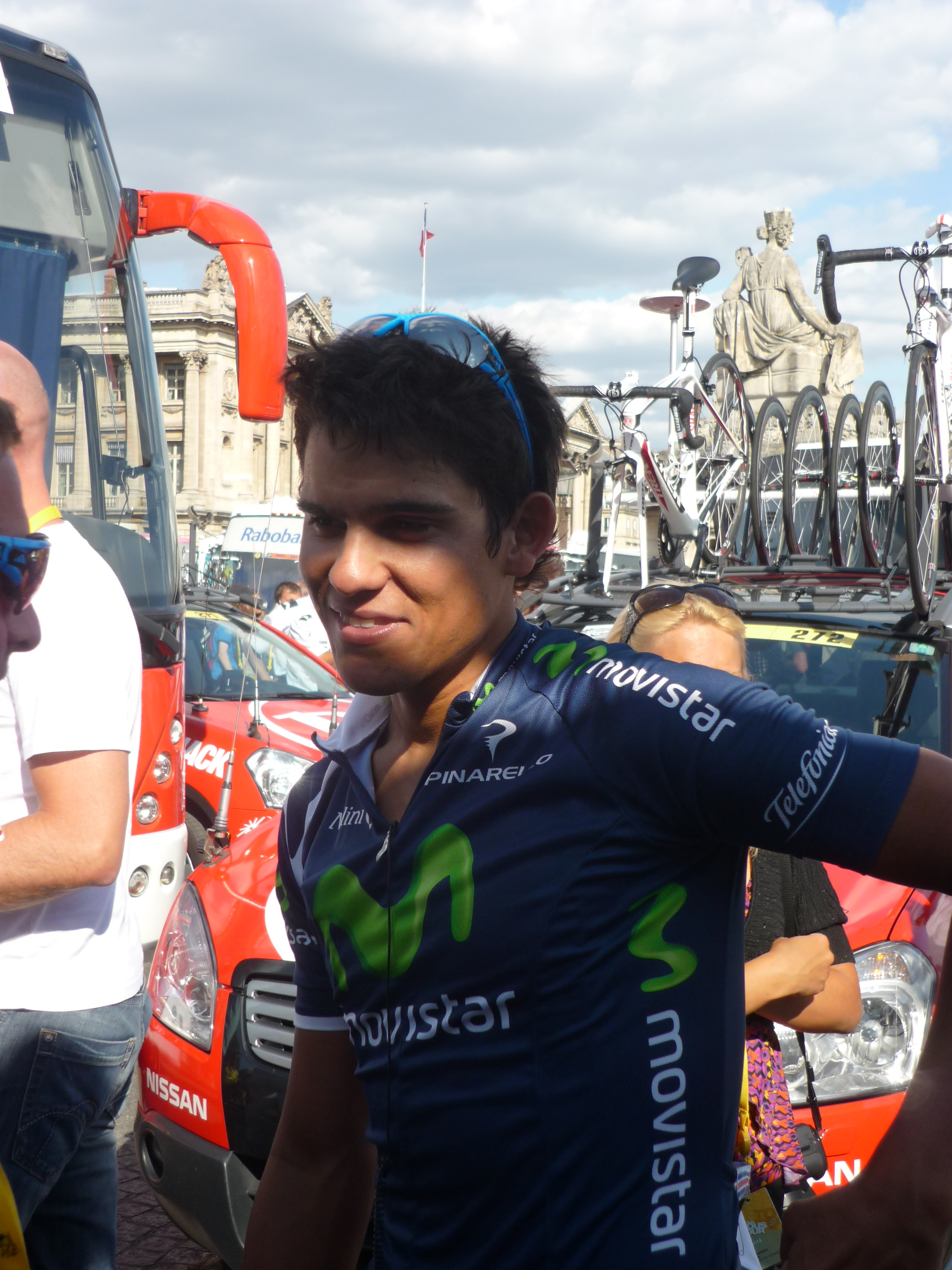
- Amador at the 2011 Tour de France.

Personal information
- Full name: Andrey Amador Bikkazakova
- Born: 29 August 1986 (age 40) Alajuela, Costa Rica
- Height: 1.81 m (5 ft 11 in)
- Weight: 73 kg (161 lb)

Cycling career
- Sport: Cycling
- Current team: Retired
- Discipline: Road
- Role: Rider
- Rider type: All-rounder

Amateur teams
- 2005–2006: BCR–Pizza Hut–KHS
- 2006: Viña Magna–Cropu
- 2007–2008: Lizarte

Professional teams
- 2009–2019: Caisse d'Epargne
- 2020–2022: Team INEOS
- 2023–2024: EF Education–EasyPost

Major wins
- Grand Tour Giro d'Italia 1 individual stage (2012) Vuelta a España 1 TTT stage (2014)
Medal record
World Championships
Representing Movistar Team
Bronze medal – third place	2015 Richmond	Team time trial

Andrey Amador Bikkazakova (born 29 August 1986) is a Costa Rican former road bicycle racer, who competed as a professional from 2009 to 2024.

== Career ==
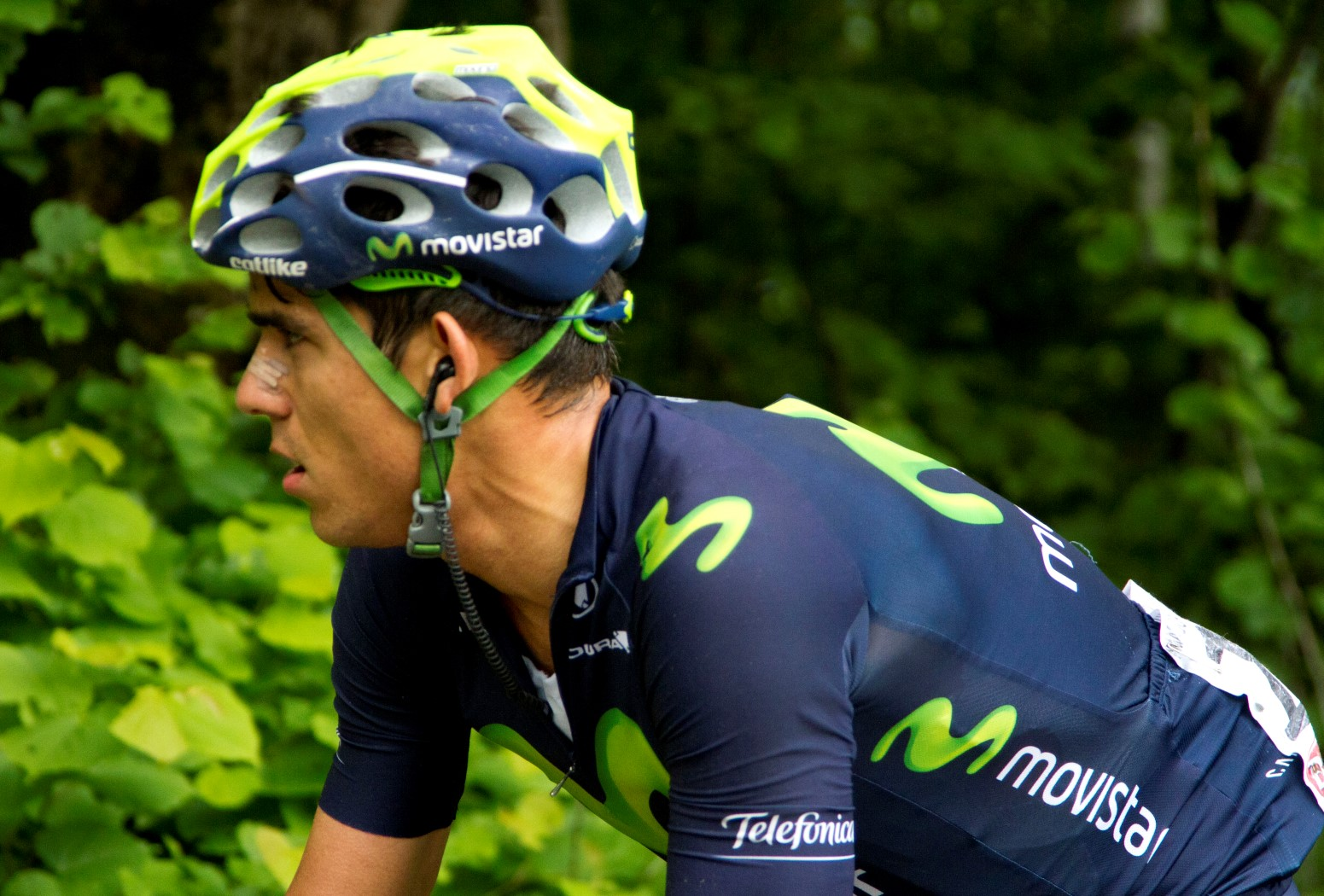
Amador at the 2015 Giro d'Italia

Amador is the son of Rodolfo Amador, a Costa Rican, and Raisa Bikkazakova, a Russian immigrant who arrived in the country after meeting and marrying Amador's father. The youngest of three brothers, Amador started cycling professionally at the age of 20 in 2006, but started cycling at a very early age. Amador was selected to carry the flag for Costa Rica at the 2011 Pan American Games opening ceremony. He is the first Costa Rican to ever ride the Tour de France. In 2012, Amador won a mountainous stage 14 in the Giro d'Italia after breaking away from the group during the final descent right before the final climb. Though he was caught right at the finish of the climb, he won the sprint in the end. In 2013, he finished 8th overall in the Tirreno-Adriatico.

In the 2016 Giro d'Italia, Amador held the pink jersey after stage 13. He became the first Costa Rican to lead a Grand Tour.

At the end of the 2019 season, Amador sought to break an agreement that he had in place with the Movistar Team for the 2020 and 2021 seasons, in order to join Team INEOS. The contract negotiations were not resolved until Amador was released by the Movistar Team on 11 February 2020. Amador signed a three-year deal with Team INEOS the following day, with his first race start scheduled to come at the UAE Tour in the final week of February. In 2023 he was riding for EF Education–EasyPost

== Major results ==
2005
5th Overall Vuelta Ciclista a Costa Rica
2006
2nd Time trial, National Under-23 Road Championships
2007
1st Stage 5 Vuelta a Navarra
2008
1st Vuelta al Bidasoa
5th Overall Tour de l'Avenir

1st Prologue

8th Overall Vuelta a Navarra
2010
10th Vuelta a La Rioja
2011
4th Vuelta a La Rioja
4th Gran Premio de Llodio
2012 (1 pro win)
1st Stage 14 Giro d'Italia
4th Prueba Villafranca de Ordizia
9th Overall Tour de San Luis
10th Overall Tour Méditerranéen
2013
8th Overall Tirreno–Adriatico
10th Gent–Wevelgem
2014
1st Stage 1 (TTT) Vuelta a España
6th Overall Tour de Pologne
10th Overall Tour du Haut Var
2015
3rd Team time trial, UCI Road World Championships
4th Overall Giro d'Italia
2016
8th Overall Giro d'Italia

Held after Stage 13

2017
5th Trofeo Serra de Tramuntana
2018 (1)
1st Klasika Primavera
9th Overall Vuelta a Andalucía
2019
2nd Trofeo Matteotti
8th Overall Tour of Britain

=== Grand Tour general classification results timeline ===
Grand Tour	2010	2011	2012	2013	2014	2015	2016	2017	2018	2019	2020	2021	2022	2023
Giro d'Italia	41	—	29	—	110	4	8	18	—	39	—	—	—	—
Tour de France	—	166	—	54	—	—	—	87	50	55	77	—	—	110
Vuelta a España	—	—	—	—	30	40	—	—	93	—	52	—	—	

Legend
—	Did not compete
DNF	Did not finish
