= Steven Kruijswijk =

Dutch road bicycle racer (born 1987)

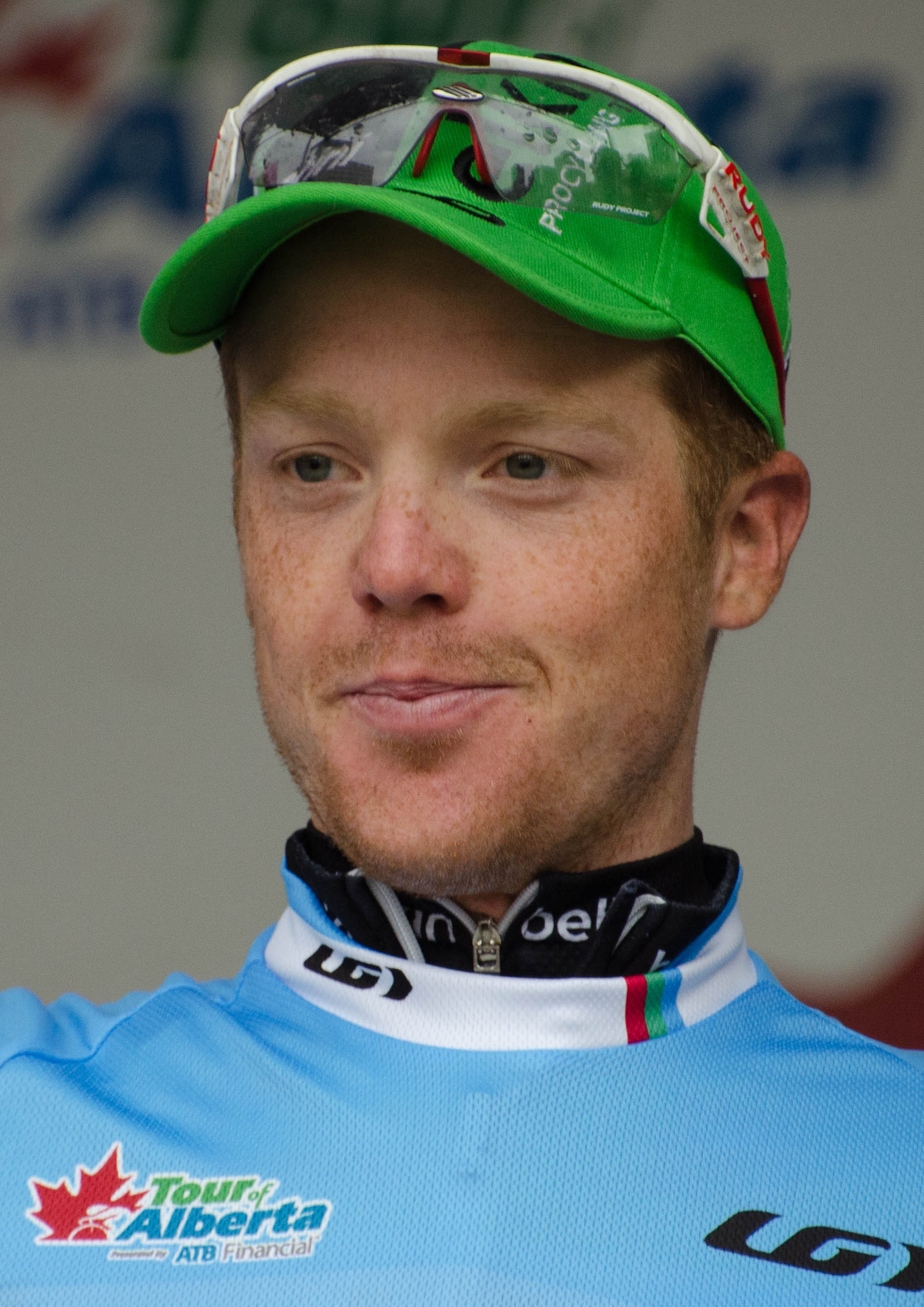
- Kruijswijk in the most aggressive classification jersey at the 2014 Tour of Alberta

Personal information
- Full name: Steven Kruijswijk
- Nickname: De Kleerhanger (The Clothes Hanger)
- Born: 7 June 1987 (age 39) Nuenen, Netherlands
- Height: 1.78 m (5 ft 10 in)
- Weight: 63 kg (139 lb; 9 st 13 lb)

Cycling career
- Sport: Cycling
- Current team: Visma–Lease a Bike
- Discipline: Road
- Role: Rider
- Rider type: All-rounder; Climber

Professional teams
- 2006: Van Vliet–EBH Advocaten
- 2007–2009: Rabobank Continental Team
- 2010–: Rabobank

Major wins
- Grand Tours Tour de France 1 TTT stage (2019)

Steven Kruijswijk (Dutch pronunciation: [ˈsteːvə(ŋ) ˈkrœysʋɛik]; born 7 June 1987) is a Dutch road bicycle racer, who rides for UCI WorldTeam Visma–Lease a Bike. Kruijswijk is best known for his strong ability in the mountains where he has achieved his greatest success; he has taken two professional victories during his career – a stage win at the 2011 Tour de Suisse, and the general classification at the 2014 Arctic Race of Norway.

He has finished in the top 5 of all three Grand Tours, and was very close to winning the 2016 Giro d'Italia but lost the lead when he crashed into a snow bank on the penultimate mountain stage. He reached the podium for the first time in a Grand Tour when he placed 3rd overall in the 2019 Tour de France finishing 1:31 behind overall winner Egan Bernal.

== Career ==
=== Early career ===
In 2007 Kruijswijk began riding for the Rabobank Continental Team. In 2009 he won the Under 23 category of the Dutch National Road Race Championships.

=== Rabobank (2010–present) ===
==== 2011–2015 ====
In 2011, Kruijswijk finished 8th overall in the Giro d'Italia and won Stage 6 in the Tour de Suisse, finishing third overall. His second career victory came at the Arctic Race of Norway in 2014.

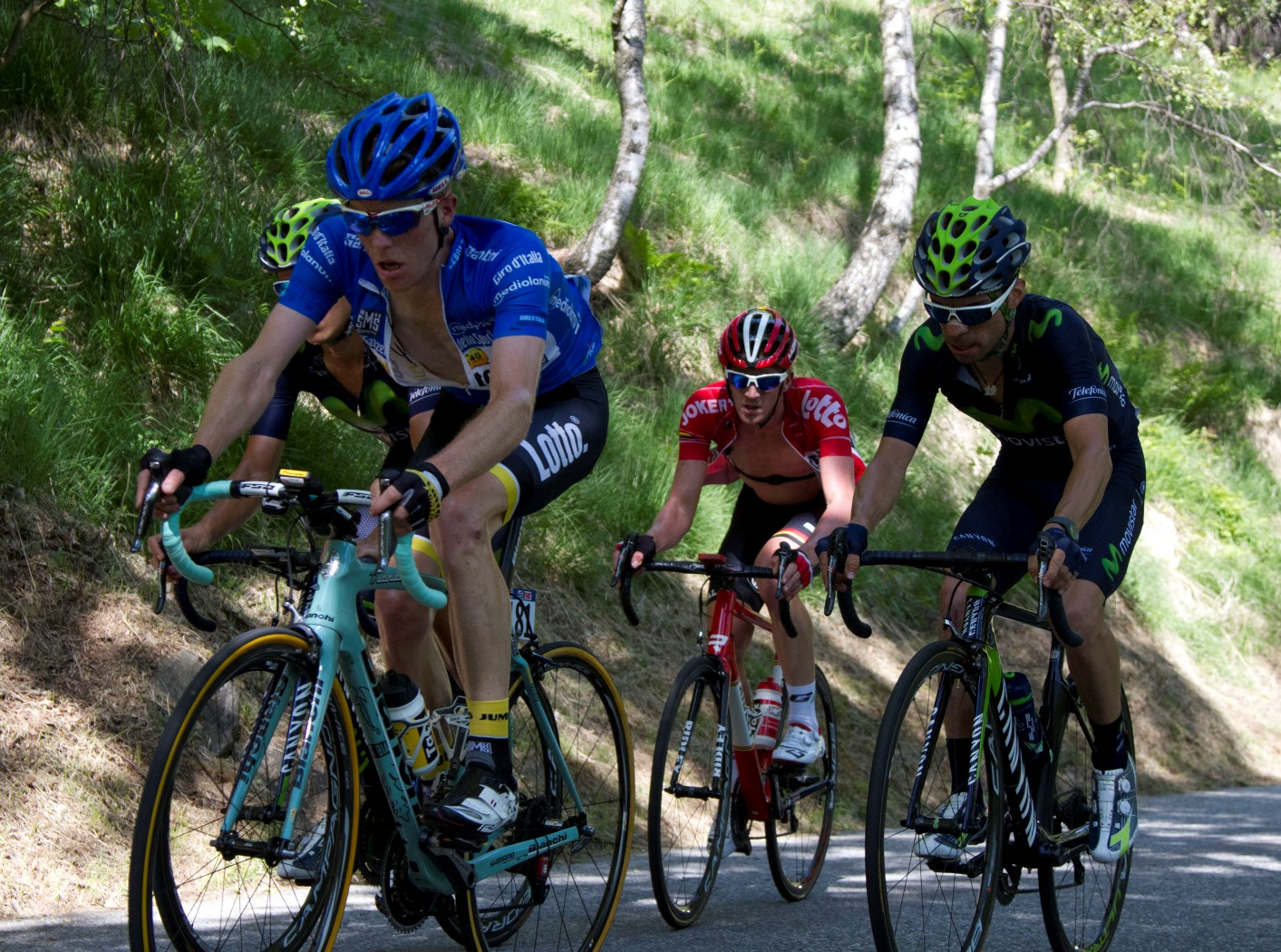
Kruijswijk (left), wearing the maglia azzurra of mountains classification leader, at the 2015 Giro d'Italia

In 2015, Kruijswijk led LottoNL–Jumbo at the Giro d'Italia. Although he lost time in the first week, Kruijswijk rode a strong second half of the race, finishing second to Mikel Landa on stage 16, the queen stage of the race. He eventually finished seventh overall, 10 minutes and 53 seconds down on Alberto Contador. Kruijswijk held the blue jersey as leader of the mountains classification from stages 16 to 18, and placed third in that competition behind Giovanni Visconti and Landa. With his efforts in the second half of the race, Kruijswijk was praised by many as the next general classification rider from the Netherlands. Kruijswijk took his form into the Tour de France where he helped teammate Robert Gesink finish in 6th place overall. Kruijswijk was also active himself on mountain stages by going into breakaways, however he had no luck of winning a stage.

==== 2016 ====
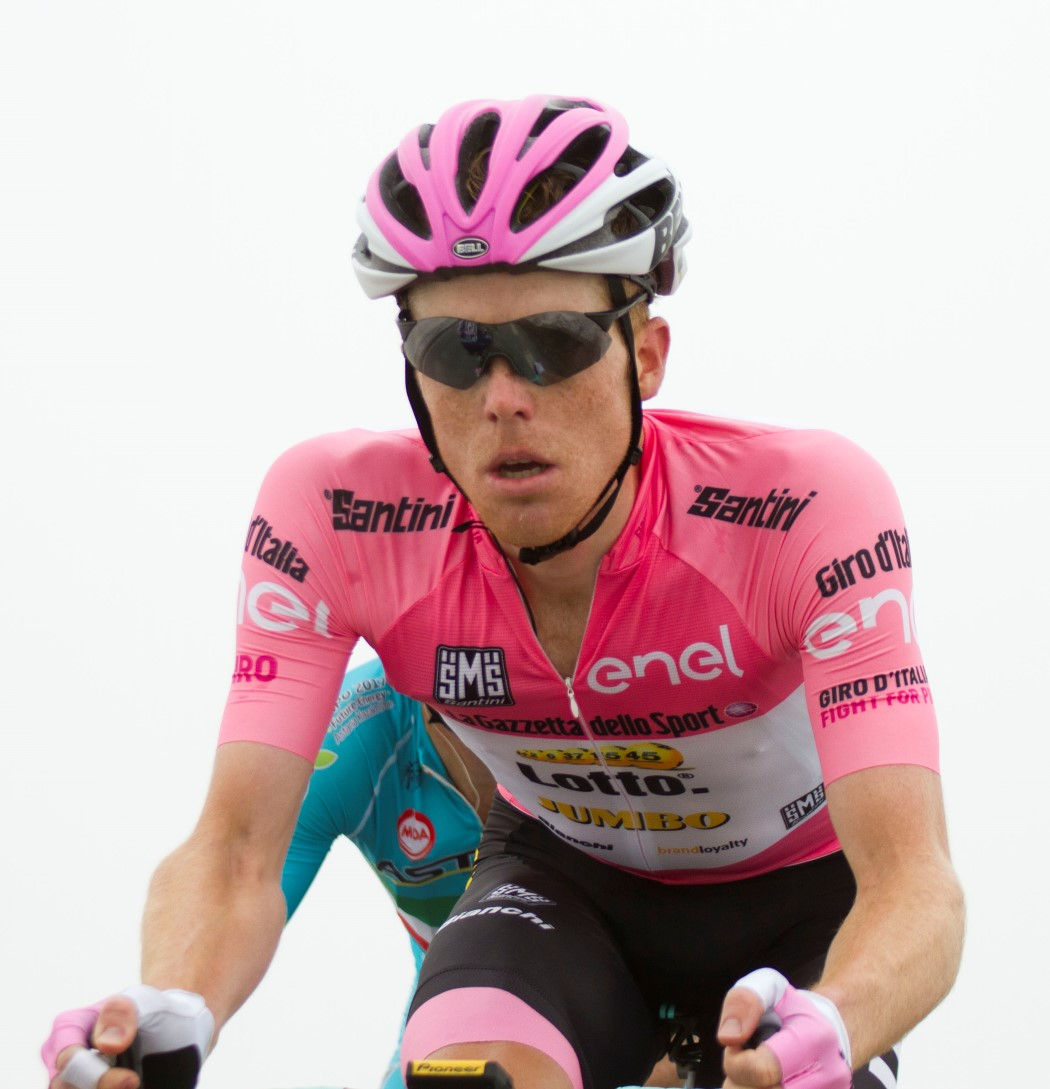
Kruijswijk, wearing the maglia rosa of general classification leader, at the 2016 Giro d'Italia

In 2016, Kruijswijk rode the Giro d'Italia again, which began with three stages in the Netherlands. On the queen stage of the race, stage 14, Kruijswijk finished second behind Esteban Chaves (Orica–GreenEDGE) to take the overall lead by 41 seconds over Vincenzo Nibali (Astana). On stage 15, a mountainous time trial finishing on the Seiser Alm, Kruijswijk again finished second, this time to Alexander Foliforov (Gazprom–RusVelo) to increase his lead to 2 minutes and 12 seconds over Chaves, as Nibali encountered mechanical issues, and dropped to third overall, 2 minutes 51 seconds behind Kruijswijk. Stage 16 saw Kruijswijk finish second for the third stage in a row, behind Alejandro Valverde (Movistar Team) and he increased his lead over Chaves to 3 minutes. However, on stage 19 Kruijswijk crashed on the descent of the Colle dell'Agnello whilst following an attack by Nibali and Chaves, landing on a bank of snow on the side of the road. Although he was able to continue, Kruijswijk finished the stage almost five minutes down on Nibali and more than four minutes behind Chaves, thus dropping to third overall. He visited the hospital after the stage where it was confirmed he had broken 2 ribs in the crash. Nonetheless, he started stage 20 where he lost further time and dropped behind Valverde to fourth overall, where he finished the Giro.

In July, Kruijswijk signed a two-year contract extension with the team. Following the disappointment of just missing out on the Giro win, Kruijswijk started the Vuelta a España, aiming to ride a good general classification in the race. He abandoned the race in the first week after a heavy crash.

==== 2017 ====
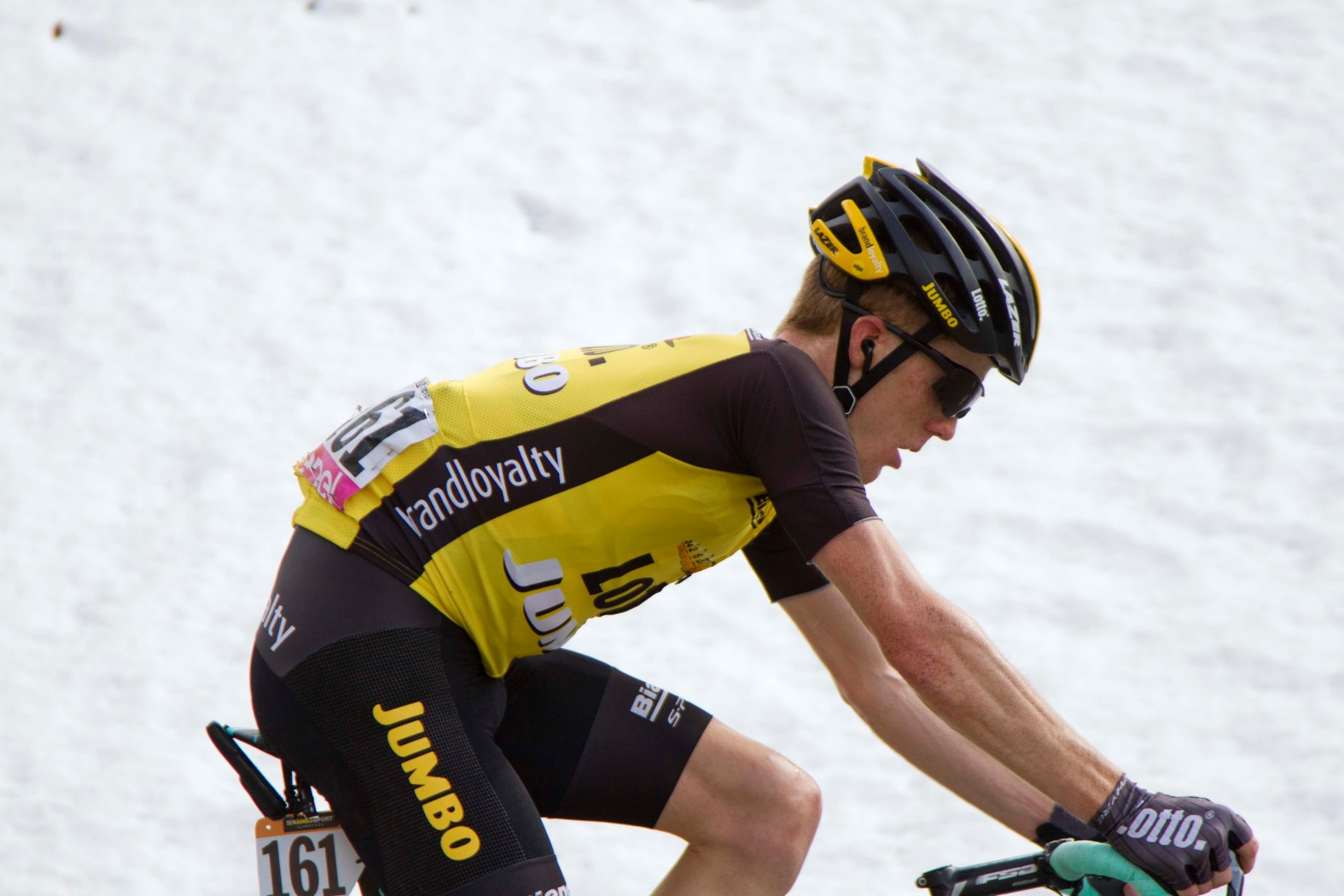
Kruiswijk at the 2017 Giro d'Italia

Kruijswijk aimed to win the 100th edition of the Giro d'Italia in 2017, after just missing out on the race win in 2016. His best result before the Giro was 7th overall at the Volta a Catalunya. He never reached his form from the previous year in the Giro however, and Kruijswijk abandoned the race in the last days due to illness. He quickly recovered at the Tour de Suisse, and reached the podium with 3rd overall. He was looking to redeem himself at the Vuelta a España where he was the team leader for LottoNL–Jumbo. Kruijswijk never reached the form he had the previous year and only broke inside the top 10 on the final days; with a 7th place on the finish to Alto de l'Angliru, Kruijswijk finished 9th overall in the race.

==== 2018 ====
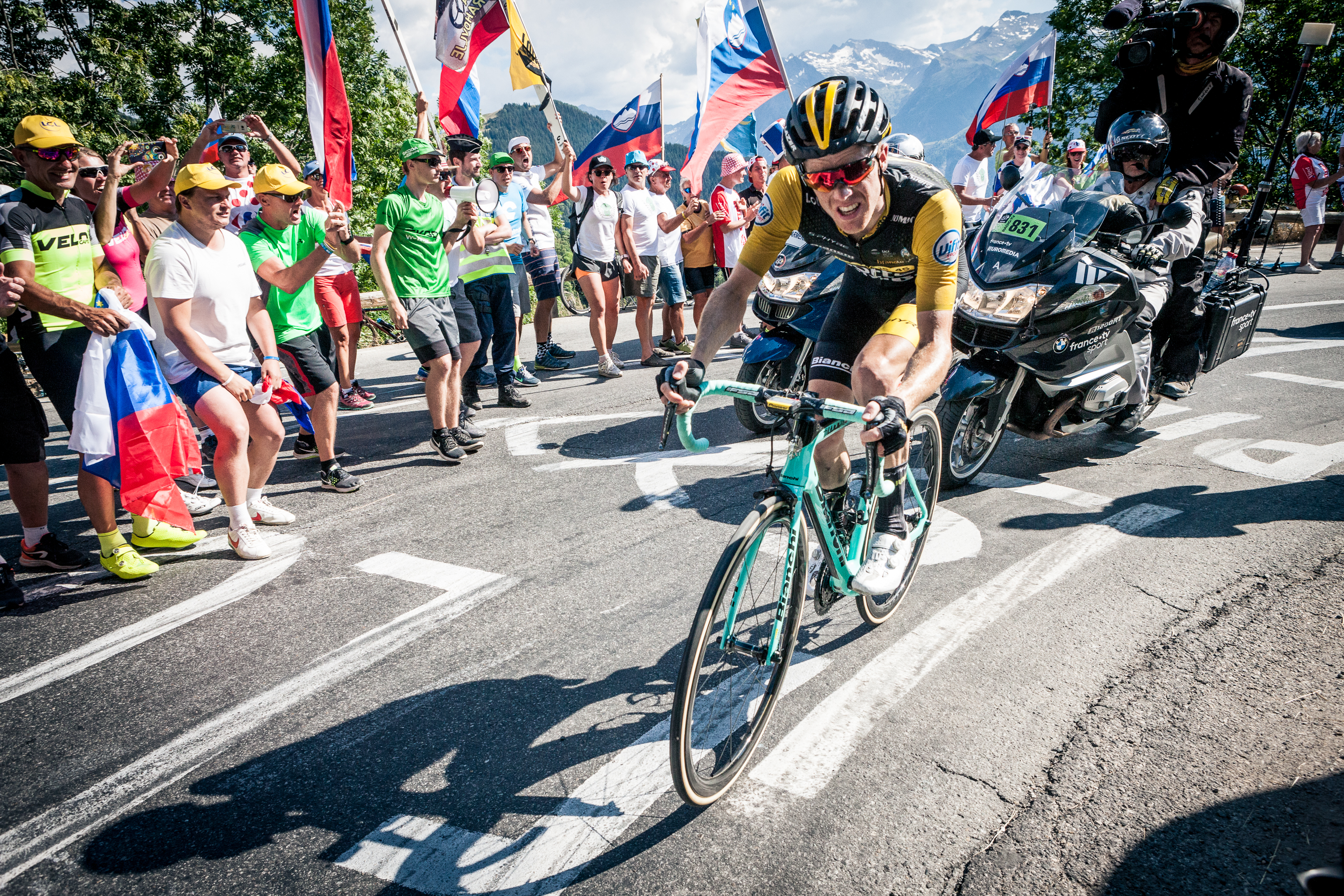
Kruijswijk during stage 12 of the 2018 Tour de France

For the 2018 season, Kruijswijk's target was on the Tour de France together with co-captain Primož Roglič. At his final preparation race for the Tour de France, Kruijswijk reached 8th position at the Tour de Suisse. When arriving at the Tour de France, Kruijswijk had a decent start and only lost time on the stage 3 team time trial. When the race entered the mountains, Kruijswijk attacked on stage 12, and entered the breakaway. He attacked solo with 80 kilometres (50 miles) to go before getting caught 5 kilometres (3.1 miles) from the finish line on Alpe d'Huez. He still managed to fight for a top ten finish on the stage, and for his effort, Kruijswijk received the combativity award on stage 12. This also put him in good position to compete for a top 10 finish for the general classification, entering the third week in the high mountains of the Pyrenees. Kruijswijk stayed with the elite riders through the final week and rode a decent individual time trial on stage 20 to finish 5th overall.

Following his strong Tour de France campaign it was decided that Kruijswijk would ride Clásica de San Sebastián as one of the team leaders. Kruijswijk finished the race in 9th place with teammates Robert Gesink and Antwan Tolhoek taking 8th and 10th places respectively. Going into his second Grand Tour of the year, the Vuelta a España, Kruijswijk was awarded the role of team leader alongside George Bennett. With a strong performance in the first week it was then decided that LottoNL–Jumbo would ride 100% in pursuit of a podium with Kruijswijk. He entered the top 5 on stage 14 after an attack on the final climb of the stage. He finished fourth on the stage 16 individual time trial, advancing to 3rd place overall. On the following day however, Kruijswijk had a bad day on the steep climb to Balcón de Bizkaia, and dropped to 5th place overall. On the penultimate stage Kruijswijk once again entered the top 3 when he finished 3rd on stage 19. When three of his contenders for the podium rode away on the second last climb of the day, Kruijswijk hesitated and lost his podium place as he had to ride the final of the last climb at his own pace. He finished in 4th place overall.

==== 2019 ====
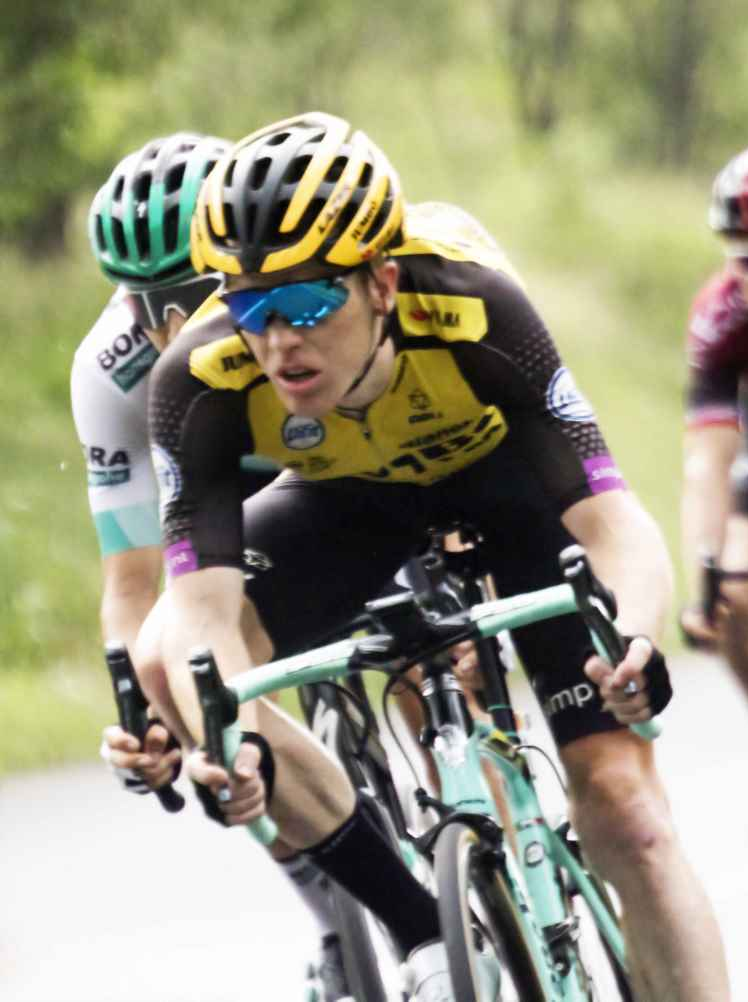
Kruijswijk at the 2019 Tour de France, where he finished third overall

Early in the 2019 season he finished third at the Vuelta a Andalucía, fifth at the Volta a Catalunya, and then sixth at the Tour de Romandie. He entered the Critérium du Dauphiné in June but withdrew from the race on its final stage. During the Tour de France, Kruijswijk spent some of the first week of the race in third place overall, following Team Jumbo–Visma's victory in the stage two team time trial. Having dropped to eighth overall by the end of the week, Kruijswijk worked his way back up the general classification and moved into third place overall again, following the stage 13 individual time trial in Pau. He finished third the following day on a summit finish at the Col du Tourmalet, and maintained third place overall until stage 18 – which included climbs of the Col du Galibier and the Col d'Izoard – as Egan Bernal gained around half a minute on his rivals, which took him past Kruijswijk, Thibaut Pinot and Geraint Thomas in the general classification. The following stage was neutralised due to a landslide, but Julian Alaphilippe cracked on the penultimate stage – a reduced 59.5-kilometre (37.0-mile) route from Albertville to Val Thorens – and Kruijswijk replaced him on the final podium. He later abandoned the Vuelta a España in August with a knee injury.

==== 2020 onwards ====
Due to the COVID-19 pandemic, Kruijswijk rode only three races during the 2020 season – and of these, finished only the Tour de l'Ain (in fourth place). He withdrew from his other two starts, the Critérium du Dauphiné (with injuries that forced him to miss the Tour de France), and the Giro d'Italia – the latter, following a positive test for COVID-19.

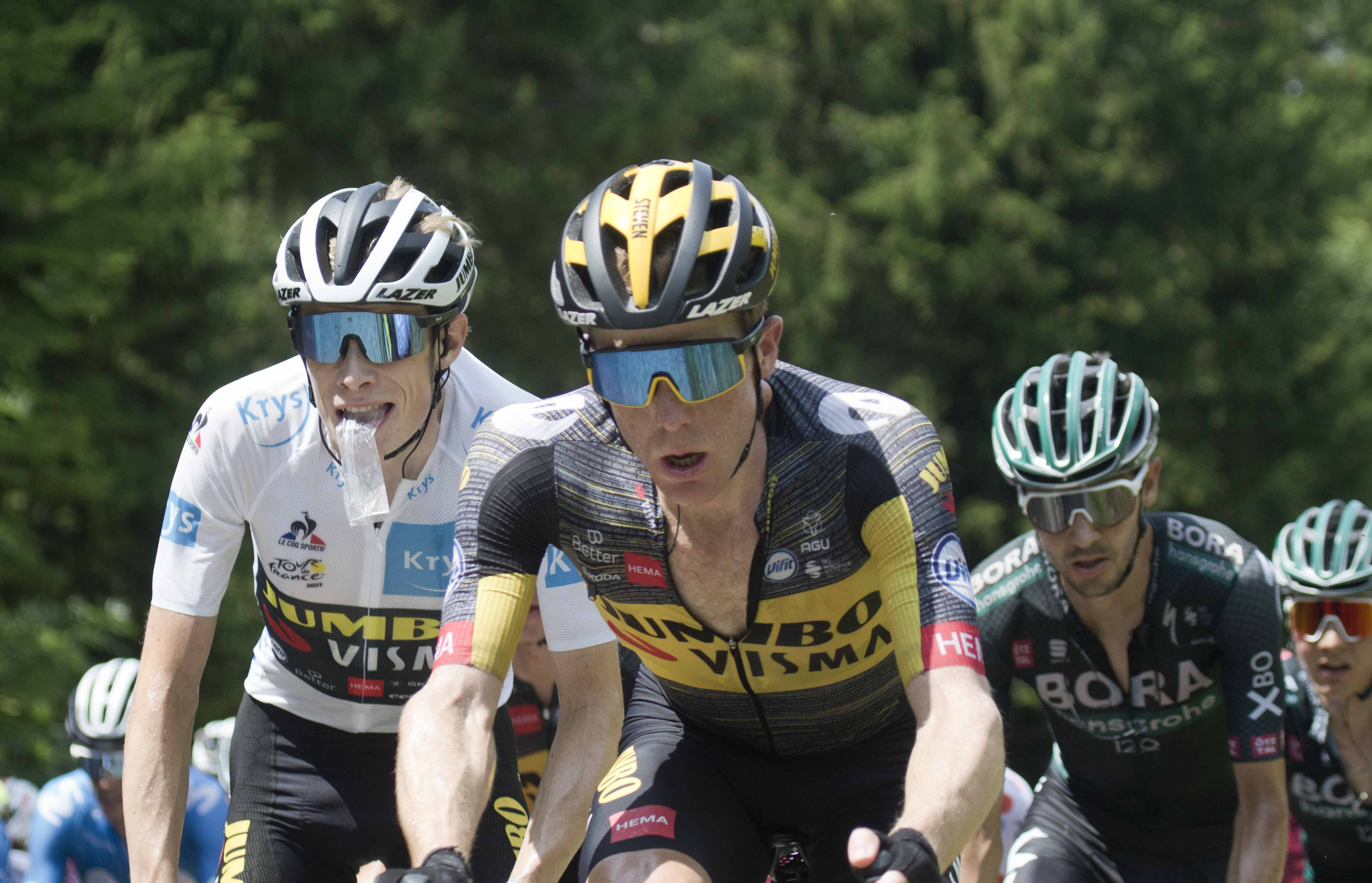
Kruijswijk leading teammate Jonas Vingegaard during the 2021 Tour de France

During the 2021 season, he rode at Paris–Nice, the Volta a Catalunya, the Tour de Romandie, and the Critérium du Dauphiné, finishing each race, but placing outside the top 10 in all of them. He failed to finish the Tour de France due to illness, but finished in twelfth place at the Vuelta a España, with a best stage result of second on the fifteenth stage. He and Sepp Kuss both rode in support of Primož Roglič, who won the Vuelta a España for the third year in a row. During the race, former Tour de France winner Bradley Wiggins stated that he thought Team Jumbo–Visma was the best team in the world.

At the start of the 2022 season, Kruijswijk rode in support of Roglič and Jonas Vingegaard in several races early in the season, with Roglič winning both Paris–Nice and the Critérium du Dauphiné. His best stage race result of the season was seventh at the Tour de Romandie. At the Tour de France, Kruijswijk again worked as a domestique – initially for Roglič before his crash on stage five dropped him down the general classification, and then for Vingegaard, who became the de facto team leader. On stage 11, Kruijswijk was one of four Team Jumbo–Visma riders in a group of eight that had isolated defending champion Tadej Pogačar, riding for the UAE Team Emirates team, on the Col du Granon. Vingegaard won the stage, and gained more than three minutes on Pogačar; he would ultimately go on to win the race overall. Kruijswijk abandoned the race on stage 15 following a crash, while lying 13th overall.

At the start of 2023, he rode in support of victories by Roglič at the Volta a Catalunya, and Vingegaard at the Tour of the Basque Country. At the Tour de Romandie, he was outperformed on the mountain stage to Thyon by neo-pro teammate Thomas Gloag; Gloag finished just outside the top-ten placings overall in eleventh, while Kruijswijk finished outside the top-thirty positions. In May, he signed a contract extension with the team until the end of the 2025 season. He crashed out of June's Critérium du Dauphiné on the second stage, suffering fractures to his clavicle and his pelvis, which ruled him out of the Tour de France.

In 2024, Kruijswijk rode the Critérium du Dauphiné again, but just like in 2023 he crashed, again missing the subsequent Tour de France.

== Major results ==
2005
3rd Time trial, National Junior Road Championships
2007
1st Prologue (TTT) Tour Alsace
7th Overall Tour du Haut-Anjou
9th Overall Thüringen Rundfahrt der U23
2008
6th Overall Cinturó de l'Empordà
2009
National Under-23 Road Championships

1st Road race
2nd Time trial

2nd Overall Thüringen Rundfahrt der U23
4th Internationale Wielertrofee Jong Maar Moedig
6th Time trial, UEC European Under-23 Road Championships
8th Overall Tour of Ireland
10th Overall Settimana Ciclistica Lombarda
2010
8th Overall Vuelta a Burgos
2011
3rd Overall Tour de Suisse

1st Stage 6

8th Overall Giro d'Italia
2012
8th Overall Tour de Suisse
9th Overall Tour of Utah
2013
10th Overall Tour of Alberta
2014
1st Overall Arctic Race of Norway
7th Overall Tour de Langkawi
2015
5th Overall Tour de l'Ain
7th Overall Giro d'Italia

Held after Stages 16–18

7th Overall Tour of Britain
10th Volta Limburg Classic
2016
4th Overall Giro d'Italia

Held after Stages 14–18

5th Overall Tour de Yorkshire
2017
3rd Overall Tour de Suisse
5th Overall Tour de l'Ain
7th Overall Volta a Catalunya
8th Overall Volta a la Comunitat Valenciana
9th Overall Vuelta a España
2018
4th Overall Vuelta a España
5th Overall Tour de France

Combativity award Stage 12

6th Overall Tour de Romandie
7th Overall Vuelta a Andalucía
8th Overall Volta a Catalunya
8th Overall Tour de Suisse
9th Clásica de San Sebastián
2019
3rd Overall Tour de France

1st Stage 2 (TTT)

3rd Overall Vuelta a Andalucía
5th Overall Volta a Catalunya
6th Overall Tour de Romandie
2020
4th Overall Tour de l'Ain
2022
7th Overall Tour de Romandie

=== General classification results timeline ===
Grand Tour general classification results
Grand Tour	2010	2011	2012	2013	2014	2015	2016	2017	2018	2019	2020	2021	2022	2023	2024
Giro d'Italia	18	8	—	26	DNF	7	4	DNF	—	—	DNF	—	—	—	—
Tour de France	—	—	33	—	15	21	—	—	5	3	—	DNF	DNF	—	—
Vuelta a España	—	41	—	—	—	—	DNF	9	4	DNF	—	12	—	—	19
Major stage race general classification results
Race	2010	2011	2012	2013	2014	2015	2016	2017	2018	2019	2020	2021	2022	2023	2024
Paris–Nice	—	—	—	76	—	21	38	DNF	—	—	—	29	26	—	—
Tirreno–Adriatico	—	—	21	—	—	—	—	—	—	—	—	—	—	—	69
Volta a Catalunya	—	71	14	DNF	DNF	15	39	7	8	5	NH	22	20	34	35
Tour of the Basque Country	—	—	DNF	—	—	—	—	—	—	—	NH	—	—	32	58
Tour de Romandie	—	41	—	21	—	—	—	—	6	6	NH	21	7	31	—
Critérium du Dauphiné	—	—	—	—	—	—	—	—	—	DNF	DNF	15	21	DNF	DNF
Tour de Suisse	—	3	8	44	27	—	—	3	8	—	NH	—	—	—	—

Legend
—	Did not compete
DNF	Did not finish
IP	In progress
NH	Not held
