= Alexander Porsev =

Russian road bicycle racer

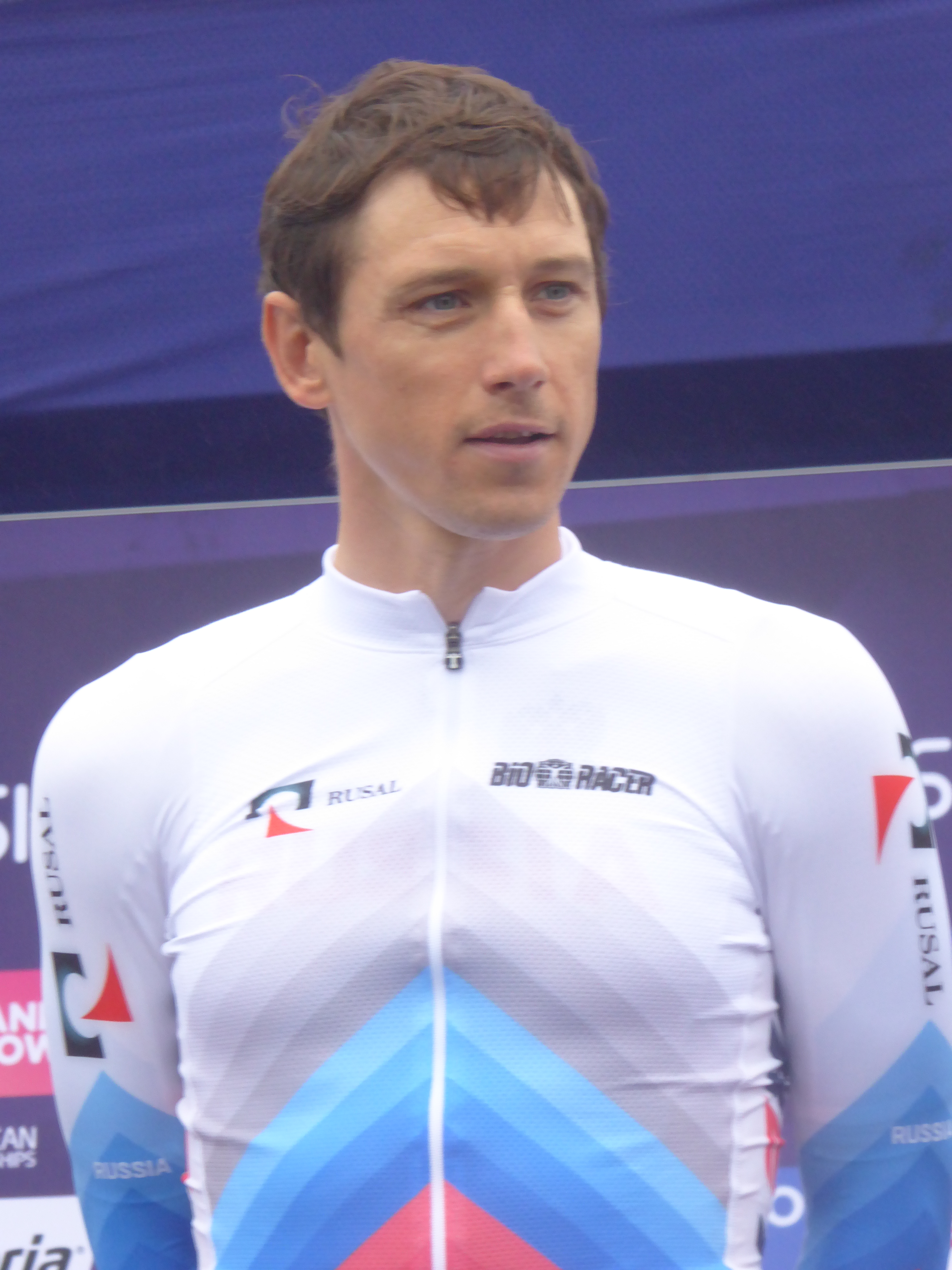
- Porsev at the 2018 European Road Cycling Championships

Personal information
- Full name: Alexander Nikolayevich Porsev
- Born: 21 February 1986 (age 40) Udmurtia, Russian SFSR, Soviet Union (now Russia)
- Height: 1.85 m (6 ft 1 in)
- Weight: 80 kg (176 lb)

Cycling career
- Sport: Cycling
- Current team: Retired
- Discipline: Road
- Role: Rider
- Rider type: Sprinter

Amateur teams
- 2008–2009: Katyusha
- 2010: Itera–Katusha
- 2010: Team Katusha (stagiaire)

Professional teams
- 2011–2016: Team Katusha
- 2017–2019: Gazprom–RusVelo

Major wins
- One-day races and Classics National Road Race Championships (2014, 2017)

Alexander Nikolayevich Porsev (born 21 February 1986) is a Russian former professional road bicycle racer, who rode professionally between 2011 and 2019, for Team Katusha and Gazprom–RusVelo.

== Major results ==
2008
5th La Roue Tourangelle
5th Grand Prix of Moscow
9th Overall Bałtyk–Karkonosze Tour
9th Duo Normand (with Dmitry Kosyakov)
2009
3rd Duo Normand (with Yevgeni Popov)
5th Grand Prix de la Somme
2010
Tour du Loir-et-Cher

1st Stages 1 & 3

2nd Mayor Cup
2nd Memorial Oleg Dyachenko
3rd Schaal Sels
4th Grand Prix de la ville de Nogent-sur-Oise
6th Overall Okolo Slovenska

1st Stages 1 & 3

8th Nokere Koerse
2011
6th Kampioenschap van Vlaanderen
10th Grand Prix d'Isbergues
2012
2nd Trofeo Migjorn
3rd Trofeo Palma
7th Scheldeprijs
9th Nokere Koerse
2013
1st Stage 1 Tour de Luxembourg
1st Stage 1b (TTT) Settimana Internazionale di Coppi e Bartali
4th Overall World Ports Classic
2014
1st Road race, National Road Championships
3rd Overall World Ports Classic
3rd ProRace Berlin
9th Overall Tour de l'Eurométropole
10th Overall Three Days of De Panne
10th Eschborn-Frankfurt – Rund um den Finanzplatz
2015
6th Clásica de Almería
2016
1st Stage 4 Tour of Slovenia
2nd Paris–Bourges
6th Grand Prix Impanis-Van Petegem
2017
1st Road race, National Road Championships
7th Trofeo Porreres-Felanitx-Ses Salines-Campos
10th Trofeo Playa de Palma
2018
2nd Road race, National Road Championships
8th Coppa Bernocchi

=== Grand Tour general classification results timeline ===
Grand Tour	2014	2015	2016
Giro d'Italia	—	132	145
Tour de France	DNF	—	—
Vuelta a España	—	—	—

Legend
—	Did not compete
DNF	Did not finish
