= Awais =

Awais (Arabic: اویس) or Owais is an Arabic given name, meaning 'gifted' or 'bestowed'. It was the name of one of Prophet Muhammad's companions Uways al-Qarani.

== People ==
=== Given name ===
- Awais Ali (born 2005), Pakistani cricketer
- Awais Khan (cyclist) (born 1994), Pakistani cyclist
- Awais Qadir Shah (born 1977), Pakistani politician
- Awais Qasim Khan (born 1969), Pakistani politician
- Awais Leghari (born 1971), Pakistani politician
- Awais Malik (born 1982), Qatari cricketer
- Awais Zia (born 1986), Pakistani cricketer
- Owais al-Qarani, guardian in Islam
- Owais Shah (born 1978), former English cricketer
- Iko Uwais (born 1983), Indonesian actor, stuntman, fight choreographer, and martial artist.
- Uwais Khan (died 1429), was the khan of Mughalistan

=== Surname ===
- Mohammad Awais (born 1992), Pakistani first-class cricketer who played for Hyderabad
- Nasir Awais (born 1983), Pakistani first-class cricketer who played for Hyderabad cricket team
- Ahmad Awais (born 2000), Pakistani entrepreneur
