= Dumoulin (disambiguation) =

Dumoulin is a surname of French origin.

Dumoulin may also refer to:

- Dumoulin Islands, Antarctica
- Dumoulin Islands (Louisiade), Papua New Guinea
- Dumoulin Rocks, Antarctica

== See also ==
- McCormick v Fasken Martineau DuMoulin LLP, a 2014 decision of the US Supreme Court relating to partnership and employment
