= Kostyantyn Rybaruk =

Ukrainian cyclist

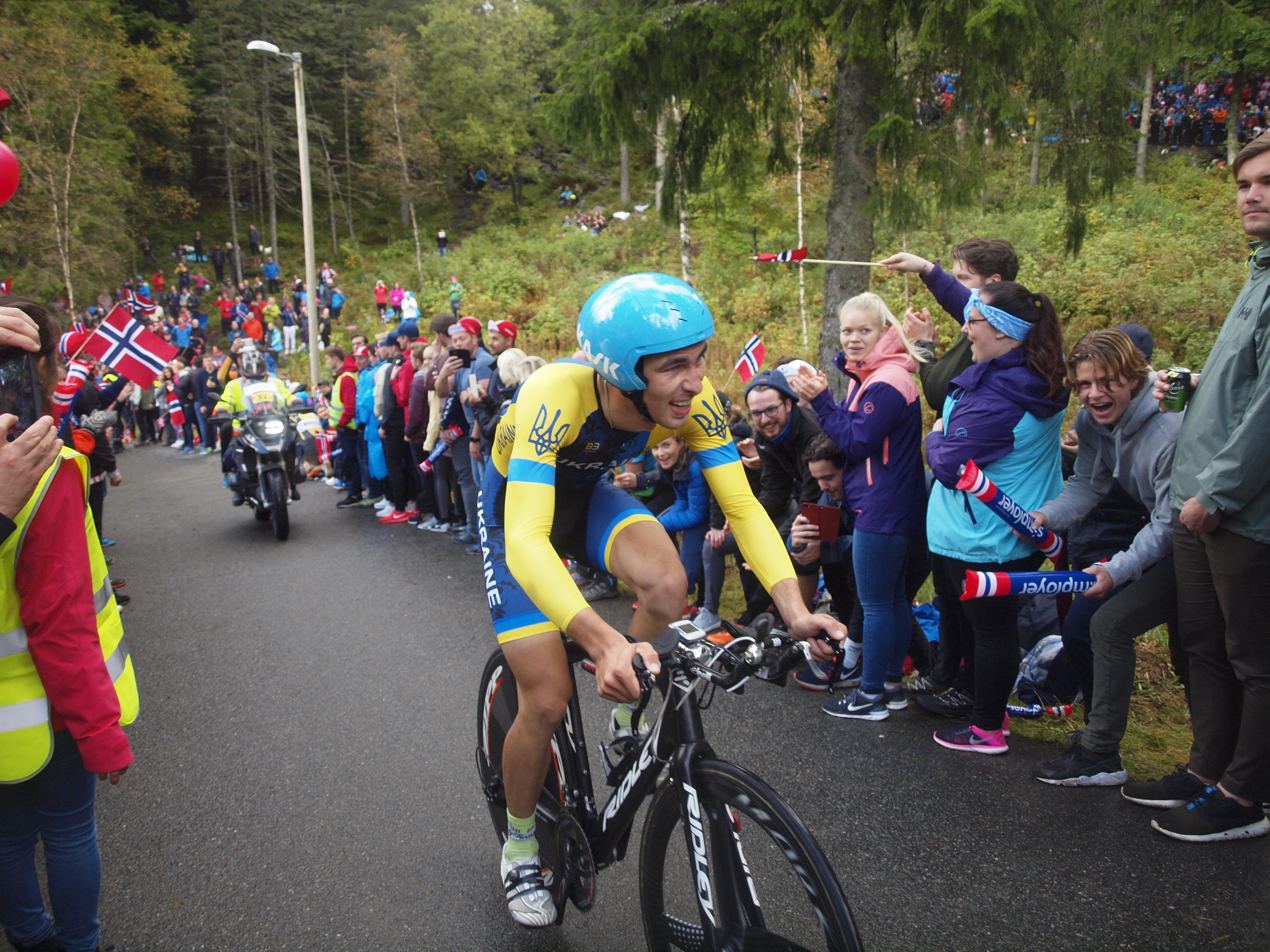
- Rybaruk at the 2017 UCI Road World Championships

Personal information
- Born: 30 August 1994 (age 32)

Cycling career
- Sport: Cycling
- Discipline: Road
- Role: Rider

Amateur team
- 2016: Dynamo Palmira Weltour

Kostyantyn Rybaruk (born 30 August 1994) is a Ukrainian cyclist. He participated in the road race and time trial at the 2017 UCI Road World Championships. He also participated in the 2013 Grand Prix of Adygeya, the 2013 Grand Prix of Sochi, the 2015 Tour of Bulgaria, the 2016 Tour of Ukraine, the 2017 Tour of Ukraine, and the 2018 Tour of Mediterrennean; along with several other races.

== Major results ==
=== 2014 ===
5th National Championships Ukraine U23 - Road Race
51st Race Horizon Park day 1

=== 2015 ===
19th Odessa Grand Prix day 1
28th Grand Prix Minsk
44th Horizon Park Race Maidan

=== 2016 ===
41st UEC Road European Championships U23 - ITT
72nd Coppa dei Laghi-Trofeo Almar
71st Grand Prix Minx
26th Minsk Cup
2nd National Championships Ukraine U23 - ITT
6th Hets Hatsafon
43rd Horizon Park Classic
24th Horizon Park for Peace

=== 2017 ===
53rd UCI Road World Championships - ITT
22nd Tour de Ribas
11th National Championships Ukraine - Road Race
17th National Championships Ukraine - ITT
67th Horizon Park Classic
90th Horizon Park Race Maidan
37th Horizon Park for Peace

=== 2019 ===
15th National Championships Ukraine - Road Race
8th National Championships Ukraine - ITT
33rd Tour de Ribas
