= Teoh Yi Peng =

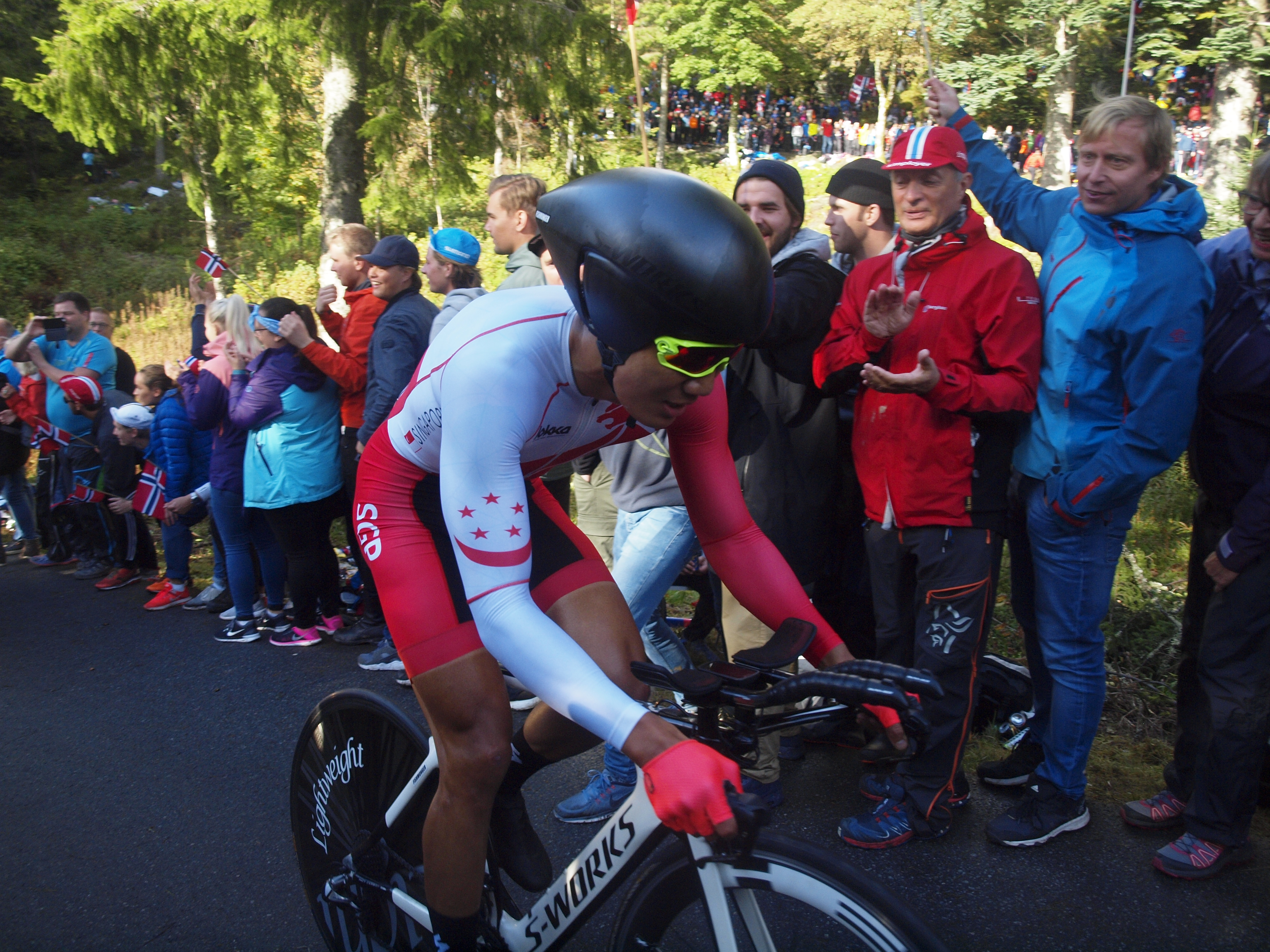
- Teoh Yi Peng at the 2017 UCI Road World Championships

Personal information
- Born: 4 May 1988 (age 38)

Cycling career
- Sport: Cycling
- Discipline: Road
- Role: Rider

Teoh Yi Peng (born 4 May 1988) is a Singaporean cyclist. He participated in the time trial in the 2017 UCI Road World Championships, the 2017 Southeast Asian Games (SEA Games), and in the 2018 Sri Lanka T-Cup. He also served on Singapore's men's team for the SEA games in 2017. He moved to Rhode Island to be with his then-fiancée and now-wife Jerrine Tan, but suffered career-ending injuries in an accident.

== Major results ==
=== 2016 ===
3rd National Singapore Road Race Championships
5th National Singapore ITT Championships

=== 2017 ===
2nd National Road Race Championships
43rd UCI Road World Championships
26th Southeast Asia Games

=== 2018 ===
12th Asian Cycling Championships - ITT
