= Rita Strohl =

- Born: Aimée Marie Marguerite Mercédès Larousse La Villette; 8 July 1865; Lorient, France
- Died: 27 March 1941 (aged 75) La Gaude, France
- Occupations: Composer, Pianist

Rita Strohl (born Aimée Marie Marguerite Mercédès Larousse La Villette) (8 July 1865 – 27 March 1941) was a French composer and pianist.

== Early life ==
Strohl was the daughter of the painter Élodie La Villette (1842–1917) and Jules La Rousse La Villette. She is also the niece of the painter Caroline Espinet.

== Musical career ==
Born in Lorient, Morbihan, Strohl was a gifted student and entered the Paris Conservatory at the age of 13, where she studied piano and solfège. She studied composition and voice privately. She was also a member of the Société des auteurs, compositeurs et éditeurs de musique. In 1884, she started publishing her chamber music trios, and the following year her Messe pour six voix, orchestre, et orgue résonne.

She is the author of several vocal, symphonic and chamber music pieces. She was endorsed by Camille Saint-Saëns, Vincent d’Indy and Gabriel Fauré. Jane Bathori sang her Chansons de Bilitis, and Pablo Casals played her music. Notably honoured by Pierre Louÿs and Henri Duparc, her music has gained renewed interest in recent years.

She created the short-lived La Grange Theatre in Bièvres, Essonne in 1912 with her second husband and with the financial support of Odilon Redon, Gustave Fayet and others, performing lyrical works filled with mysticism and symbolism. It closed at the beginning of World War I.

== Personal life ==
In 1888, she married the sub lieutenant Émile Strohl (1863-1900), giving birth to four children.

After his death, she married the master glassmaker Richard Burgsthal (pseudonym René Billa), almost 20 years her junior, in 1903.

She divorced him in 1930, and moved to Provence to live with her daughter and grandson.

== Works ==
- Forêt de Brocéliande (1887)
- Titus et Bérénice. Sonate dramatique for cello and piano (premiered 1892)
- Cloche de Noel (1895)
- Solitude (Reverie) (1897)
- Madeleine (1897)
- In coelo et in terra, sonnet, words by Charles Sinoir (published 1897)
- Bilitis, 12 songs on the poems by Pierre Louÿs, premiered by Jane Bathori in 1898
- Thème et variations, Op. 40 (1900)
- Symphonie de la forêt (1901)
- Dix Poésies mises en musique (1901)
- Symphonie de la mer (1902)
- Musique sur l'eau (1903)
- Trois Préludes pour orchestre, first performed at the Concerts Lamoureux in 1904
- Le Suprême Puruscha, a mystic song-cycle in seven parts (1908)
- La Femme pécheresse, drama lyrique (1913)
- Grande Fantaisie-quintette
