= Dumoulin =

Dumoulin is a surname of French origin similar to Desmoulins, see the latter article for the etymology. People with that name include:

- Brian Dumoulin (b. 1991), American ice hockey player
- Charles Dumoulin (1500–1566), French jurist
- Charles Dumoulin (1768–1825), French general
- Clément Adrien Vincendon-Dumoulin (1811–1858), French hydrographer
- Cyril Dumoulin (b. 1984), French handball player
- David Dumoulin (16??–after 1751), French dancer
- François Aimé Louis Dumoulin (1753–1834), Swiss painter and engraver
- Franck Dumoulin (b. 1973), French pistol shooter
- Georges Dumoulin (1877–1963), French politician
- Georges Dumoulin (b. 1934), French director
- Gilles-Maurice Dumoulin (1924–2016), French science fiction writer
- Marcel Dumoulin (1905–1981), French weightlifter
- Nicolas Dumoulin (b. 1985), Canadian ice hockey player
- Olivier Dumoulin, French historian
- Paul Dumoulin (1827–1859), French painter and caricaturist
- Pierre Du Moulin (1568–1658), French theologian, and Huguenot minister
- Pierre Charles Dumoulin (1749–1809), French general
- Roméo Dumoulin (1883–1944), Belgian painter and engraver
- Samuel Dumoulin (b. 1980), French road bicycle racer
- Tom Dumoulin (b. 1990), Dutch road bicycle racer
