= 2017 UCI Road World Championships – Men's road race =

Men's road race
2017 UCI Road World Championships
- Rainbow jersey

Race details
- Dates: 24 September 2017
- Stages: 1
- Distance: 267.5 km (166.2 mi)
- Winning time: 6h 28' 11"

Medalists
	Gold	Peter Sagan (SVK)
	Silver	Alexander Kristoff (NOR)
	Bronze	Michael Matthews (AUS)

The Men's road race of the 2017 UCI Road World Championships was a cycling event that took place on 24 September 2017 in Bergen, Norway. It was the 84th edition of the championship, and Slovakia's Peter Sagan was the two times defending champion.

After a late move from France's Julian Alaphilippe was brought back within the final kilometres, Sagan outsprinted his rivals to win a third consecutive world title, the first male rider to do so. As well as this, he became the fifth man – after Alfredo Binda, Rik Van Steenbergen, Eddy Merckx and Óscar Freire – to win three elite road world championship titles. European champion Alexander Kristoff from Norway took the silver medal, while the bronze medal went to Australian Michael Matthews.

== Course ==
The race started in Rong and traversed 39.5 kilometres (24.5 miles) before reaching the finishing circuit in Bergen. After a further 17.9 kilometres (11.1 miles), the riders crossed the finish line on the Festplassen for the first time, with the riders completing eleven full laps of the circuit 19.1 kilometres (11.9 miles) in length. The main feature of the circuit was the climb of Salmon Hill, about 7 kilometres (4.3 miles) into the lap; the climb was 1.5 kilometres (0.93 miles) long at an average gradient of 6.4%. At 267.5 kilometres (166.2 miles), the 2017 men's road race was the longest in the championships since 272.26 kilometres (169.17 miles) were covered in 2013.

== Qualification ==
Qualification were based on performances on the UCI World Ranking on August 15, 2017.

=== UCI World Rankings ===
The following nations qualified.

Criterium	Rank	Number of riders		Nations
Criterium	Rank	To enter	To start	Nations
UCI World Ranking by Nations	1–10	14	9	Belgium; Colombia; Spain; France; Italy; Australia; Netherlands; Great Britain; Germany; Norway
UCI World Ranking by Nations	11–20	9	6	Poland; Slovakia; Ireland; Slovenia; Denmark; United States; Switzerland; Czech Republic; Portugal; Russia
UCI World Ranking by Nations	21–30	6	3	Luxembourg; Austria; South Africa; New Zealand; Canada; Belarus; Ukraine; Kazakhstan; Eritrea; Estonia
UCI World Ranking by Nations	31–50	2	1	Latvia; Iran; Morocco; Romania; Lithuania; Venezuela; Argentina; Turkey; Costa Rica; Japan; Ecuador; Croatia; Rwanda; Brazil; Sweden; South Korea; Algeria; Tunisia; China; Azerbaijan
UCI World Ranking by Individuals (if not already qualified)	1–200	2	1	—

=== Additional places ===
Ukraine, Iran, Venezuela, Turkey, Ecuador, Croatia, Brazil, South Korea, Algeria, Tunisia and China have chosen not to use (all of their) quota places. Latvia, Argentina, Sweden, Greece, Hong Kong, Finland and Albania have received additional quota places.

=== Participating nations ===
196 cyclists from 44 nations were entered in the men's road race, however Irish representative Damien Shaw did not start the race. The number of cyclists per nation is shown in parentheses.

- Albania (1)
- Argentina (2)
- Australia (9)
- Austria (3)
- Azerbaijan (1)
- Belarus (3)
- Belgium (9)
- Canada (3)
- Colombia (9)
- Costa Rica (1)
- Czech Republic (6)
- Denmark (6)
- Eritrea (3)
- Estonia (3)
- Finland (1)
- France (9)
- Germany (9)
- Great Britain (9)
- Greece (1)
- Hong Kong (1)
- Ireland (~~6~~ 5)
- Italy (9)
- Japan (1)
- Kazakhstan (3)
- Latvia (2)
- Lithuania (1)
- Luxembourg (3)
- Morocco (1)
- Netherlands (9)
- New Zealand (3)
- Norway (9)
- Poland (6)
- Portugal (6)
- Romania (1)
- Russia (6)
- Rwanda (1)
- Slovakia (6)
- Slovenia (6)
- South Africa (3)
- Spain (9)
- Sweden (2)
- Switzerland (6)
- Ukraine (2)
- United States (6)

== Final classification ==
Of the race's 196 entrants, 132 riders completed the full distance of 267.5 kilometres (166.2 miles).

Rank	Rider	Country	Time
1	Peter Sagan	Slovakia	6h 28' 11"
2	Alexander Kristoff	Norway	+ 0"
3	Michael Matthews	Australia	+ 0"
4	Matteo Trentin	Italy	+ 0"
5	Ben Swift	Great Britain	+ 0"
6	Greg Van Avermaet	Belgium	+ 0"
7	Michael Albasini	Switzerland	+ 0"
8	Fernando Gaviria	Colombia	+ 0"
9	Alexey Lutsenko	Kazakhstan	+ 0"
10	Julian Alaphilippe	France	+ 0"
11	Michał Kwiatkowski	Poland	+ 0"
12	Søren Kragh Andersen	Denmark	+ 0"
13	Tony Gallopin	France	+ 0"
14	Zdeněk Štybar	Czech Republic	+ 0"
15	Vasil Kiryienka	Belarus	+ 0"
16	Vyacheslav Kuznetsov	Russia	+ 0"
17	Philippe Gilbert	Belgium	+ 0"
18	Sergey Chernetskiy	Russia	+ 0"
19	Rui Costa	Portugal	+ 0"
20	Simon Geschke	Germany	+ 0"
21	Michael Valgren	Denmark	+ 0"
22	Lukas Pöstlberger	Austria	+ 0"
23	Ilnur Zakarin	Russia	+ 0"
24	Niki Terpstra	Netherlands	+ 0"
25	Tom Dumoulin	Netherlands	+ 0"
26	Dan Martin	Ireland	+ 0"
27	Rigoberto Urán	Colombia	+ 5"
28	Alberto Bettiol	Italy	+ 5"
29	Magnus Cort	Denmark	+ 27"
30	Edvald Boasson Hagen	Norway	+ 1' 04"
31	Jonathan Castroviejo	Spain	+ 1' 04"
32	Julien Simon	France	+ 1' 04"
33	Nicolas Roche	Ireland	+ 1' 04"
34	Bauke Mollema	Netherlands	+ 1' 20"
35	Guillaume Boivin	Canada	+ 1' 20"
36	Peter Kennaugh	Great Britain	+ 1' 22"
37	Warren Barguil	France	+ 1' 23"
38	Diego Ulissi	Italy	+ 1' 23"
39	Reinardt Janse van Rensburg	South Africa	+ 2' 32"
40	Nikias Arndt	Germany	+ 2' 32"
41	Michael Schär	Switzerland	+ 2' 32"
42	Luka Pibernik	Slovenia	+ 2' 32"
43	Aleksejs Saramotins	Latvia	+ 2' 32"
44	Stefan Küng	Switzerland	+ 2' 32"
45	Juraj Sagan	Slovakia	+ 2' 32"
46	Yukiya Arashiro	Japan	+ 2' 32"
47	Marcus Burghardt	Germany	+ 2' 32"
48	Roman Kreuziger	Czech Republic	+ 2' 32"
49	Daryl Impey	South Africa	+ 2' 32"
50	Silvan Dillier	Switzerland	+ 2' 32"
51	Tobias Ludvigsson	Sweden	+ 2' 32"
52	Michał Gołaś	Poland	+ 2' 32"
53	Alex Howes	United States	+ 2' 32"
54	Imanol Erviti	Spain	+ 2' 32"
55	Nelson Oliveira	Portugal	+ 2' 32"
56	Odd Christian Eiking	Norway	+ 2' 32"
57	Elia Viviani	Italy	+ 2' 32"
58	José Joaquín Rojas	Spain	+ 2' 32"
59	Sonny Colbrelli	Italy	+ 2' 32"
60	Simon Clarke	Australia	+ 2' 32"
61	Jan Polanc	Slovenia	+ 2' 32"
62	Mitchell Docker	Australia	+ 2' 32"
63	Eduardo Sepúlveda	Argentina	+ 2' 32"
64	Tiago Machado	Portugal	+ 2' 32"
65	Ricardo Vilela	Portugal	+ 2' 32"
66	Luis León Sánchez	Spain	+ 2' 32"
67	Jarlinson Pantano	Colombia	+ 2' 32"
68	Stefan Denifl	Austria	+ 2' 32"
69	Tony Martin	Germany	+ 2' 32"
70	David de la Cruz	Spain	+ 2' 32"
71	Bob Jungels	Luxembourg	+ 2' 32"
72	Dylan Teuns	Belgium	+ 2' 32"
73	Oliver Naesen	Belgium	+ 2' 32"
74	Sebastian Langeveld	Netherlands	+ 2' 32"
75	Michael Mørkøv	Denmark	+ 2' 32"
76	Christopher Juul-Jensen	Denmark	+ 2' 32"
77	Vegard Stake Laengen	Norway	+ 2' 32"
78	Andriy Hrivko	Ukraine	+ 3' 13"
79	Jan Bárta	Czech Republic	+ 3' 13"
80	Zhandos Bizhigitov	Kazakhstan	+ 3' 13"
81	Hugo Houle	Canada	+ 3' 13"
82	Paweł Poljański	Poland	+ 3' 13"
83	Natnael Berhane	Eritrea	+ 3' 13"
84	Anthony Roux	France	+ 3' 13"
85	Lilian Calmejane	France	+ 3' 13"
86	Cyril Gautier	France	+ 3' 13"
87	Jens Keukeleire	Belgium	+ 3' 13"
88	Salvatore Puccio	Italy	+ 3' 13"
89	Jasper Stuyven	Belgium	+ 5' 49"
90	Paul Martens	Germany	+ 5' 49"
91	Matej Mohorič	Slovenia	+ 5' 49"
92	Luka Mezgec	Slovenia	+ 5' 49"
93	Heinrich Haussler	Australia	+ 5' 49"
94	Jack Haig	Australia	+ 5' 49"
95	Tiesj Benoot	Belgium	+ 6' 33"
96	Łukasz Wiśniowski	Poland	+ 6' 37"
97	Scott Thwaites	Great Britain	+ 7' 33"
98	Mark Christian	Great Britain	+ 7' 33"

Rank	Rider	Country	Time
99	Rick Zabel	Germany	+ 7' 33"
100	Fabian Lienhard	Switzerland	+ 7' 33"
101	Amund Grøndahl Jansen	Norway	+ 7' 33"
102	Ignatas Konovalovas	Lithuania	+ 7' 33"
103	Lluís Mas	Spain	+ 7' 33"
104	Lars Boom	Netherlands	+ 7' 35"
105	Daniele Bennati	Italy	+ 7' 35"
106	Jesús Herrada	Spain	+ 7' 35"
107	Gorka Izagirre	Spain	+ 7' 35"
108	Marc Soler	Spain	+ 7' 35"
109	Kiel Reijnen	United States	+ 7' 35"
110	Tim Wellens	Belgium	+ 9' 21"
111	Grégory Rast	Switzerland	+ 9' 24"
112	Marco Haller	Austria	+ 9' 24"
113	Alessandro De Marchi	Italy	+ 9' 26"
114	Nils Politt	Germany	+ 10' 21"
115	Sergio Henao	Colombia	+ 10' 21"
116	Jasha Sütterlin	Germany	+ 10' 21"
117	Tao Geoghegan Hart	Great Britain	+ 10' 21"
118	Johannes Fröhlinger	Germany	+ 10' 21"
119	Koen de Kort	Netherlands	+ 10' 21"
120	Antoine Duchesne	Canada	+ 10' 21"
121	Primož Roglič	Slovenia	+ 10' 21"
122	Olivier Le Gac	France	+ 10' 21"
123	Mihkel Räim	Estonia	+ 11' 53"
124	Joey Rosskopf	United States	+ 11' 53"
125	Daniel Hoelgaard	Norway	+ 11' 53"
126	Ryan Mullen	Ireland	+ 11' 53"
127	Jiří Polnický	Czech Republic	+ 11' 53"
128	Dmitriy Gruzdev	Kazakhstan	+ 11' 53"
129	Dion Smith	New Zealand	+ 11' 53"
130	José Gonçalves	Portugal	+ 11' 53"
131	Maximiliano Richeze	Argentina	+ 11' 53"
132	Jempy Drucker	Luxembourg	+ 11' 53"
	Truls Korsæth	Norway	DNF
	Michael Kolář	Slovakia	DNF
	Jack Bauer	New Zealand	DNF
	Luke Durbridge	Australia	DNF
	Wout Poels	Netherlands	DNF
	Conor Dunne	Ireland	DNF
	Andrey Amador	Costa Rica	DNF
	Nairo Quintana	Colombia	DNF
	Stanislau Bazhkou	Belarus	DNF
	Ruben Guerreiro	Portugal	DNF
	Tejay van Garderen	United States	DNF
	Krists Neilands	Latvia	DNF
	Maciej Paterski	Poland	DNF
	Jos van Emden	Netherlands	DNF
	Rory Sutherland	Australia	DNF
	Juan Sebastián Molano	Colombia	DNF
	Jay McCarthy	Australia	DNF
	Alexey Vermeulen	United States	DNF
	Erik Baška	Slovakia	DNF
	Marek Čanecký	Slovakia	DNF
	Maciej Bodnar	Poland	DNF
	Sebastián Henao	Colombia	DNF
	Alex Kirsch	Luxembourg	DNF
	Alexander Porsev	Russia	DNF
	Willie Smit	South Africa	DNF
	Jan Tratnik	Slovenia	DNF
	Alexis Gougeard	France	DNF
	Adam Blythe	Great Britain	DNF
	Owain Doull	Great Britain	DNF
	Jonathan Dibben	Great Britain	DNF
	Sean McKenna	Ireland	DNF
	Julien Vermote	Belgium	DNF
	Kim Magnusson	Sweden	DNF
	Petr Vakoč	Czech Republic	DNF
	Kristoffer Skjerping	Norway	DNF
	August Jensen	Norway	DNF
	Maxim Belkov	Russia	DNF
	Nelson Soto	Colombia	DNF
	Jhonatan Restrepo	Colombia	DNF
	Danny van Poppel	Netherlands	DNF
	Alo Jakin	Estonia	DNF
	Aksel Nõmmela	Estonia	DNF
	Serghei Țvetcov	Romania	DNF
	Mads Pedersen	Denmark	DNF
	Charalampos Kastrantas	Greece	DNF
	Salah Eddine Mraouni	Morocco	DNF
	Patrik Tybor	Slovakia	DNF
	Ian Stannard	Great Britain	DNF
	Ivan Savitskiy	Russia	DNF
	Josef Černý	Czech Republic	DNF
	Elchin Asadov	Azerbaijan	DNF
	Kostyantyn Rybaruk	Ukraine	DNF
	Nathan Brown	United States	DNF
	Valens Ndayisenga	Rwanda	DNF
	Mekseb Debesay	Eritrea	DNF
	Eugert Zhupa	Albania	DNF
	Yauhen Sobal	Belarus	DNF
	Cheung King Lok	Hong Kong	DNF
	Patrick Bevin	New Zealand	DNF
	Matti Manninen	Finland	DNF
	Mathew Hayman	Australia	DNF
	Amanuel Gebrezgabihier	Eritrea	DNF
	Gianni Moscon	Italy	DSQ
	Damien Shaw	Ireland	DNS
