= Awais Khan (cyclist) =

Pakistani cyclist

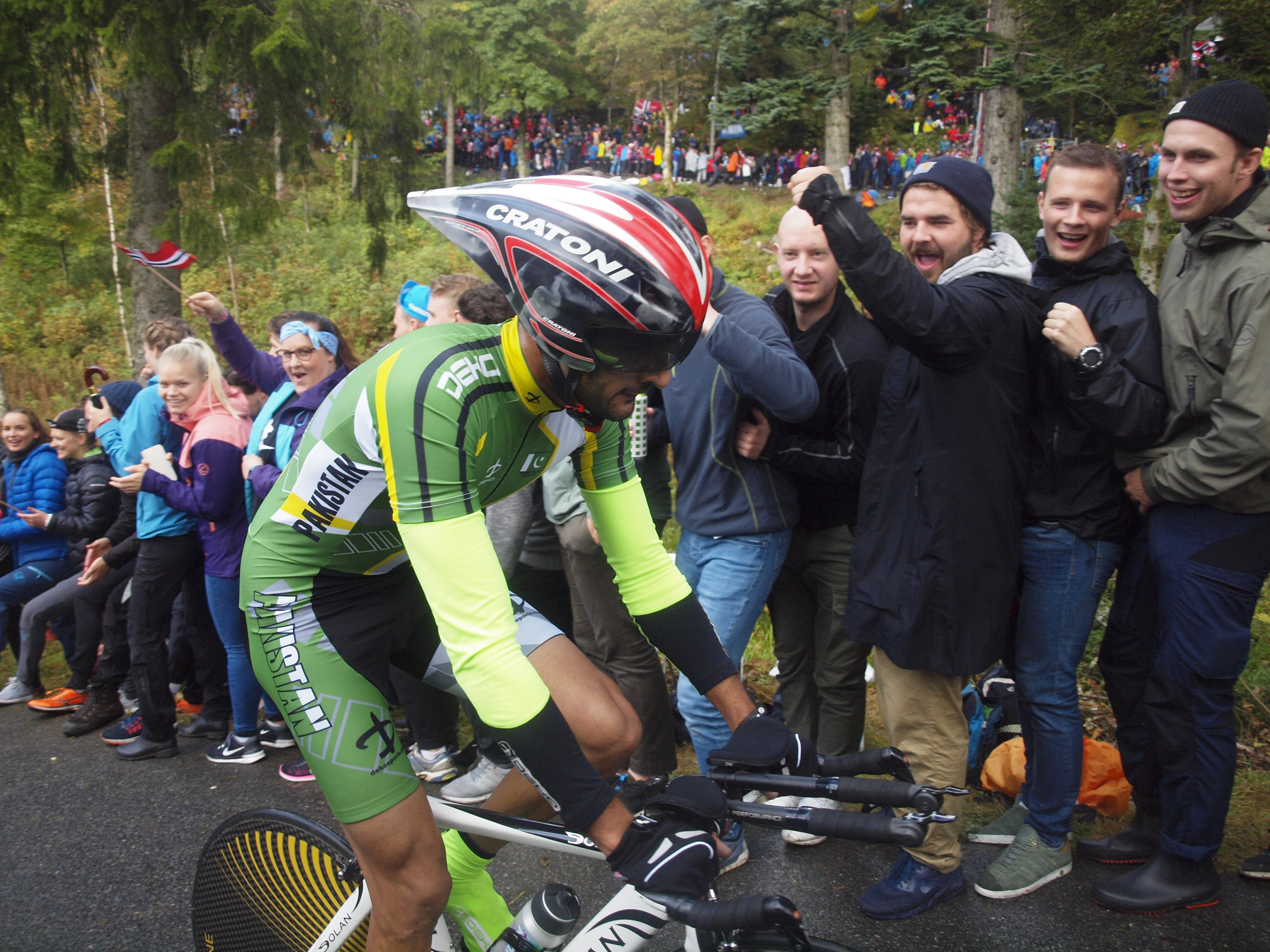
- Awais Khan at the 2017 UCI Road World Championships

Personal information
- Born: 20 April 1994 (age 32) Peshawar, Khyber Pakhtunkhwa, Pakistan

Cycling career
- Sport: Cycling
- Discipline: Road
- Role: Rider

Awais Khan (born 20 April 1994) is a Pakistani cyclist. He rode in the time trial at the 2017 UCI Road World Championships. In 2019, he participated in Tour De Khunjerab Cycle Race, and completed with the first position in its third stage.

== Major results ==
=== 2015 ===
1st RSF Cycle Race
1st Tour of Mohmand

=== 2016 ===
10th Asian Cycling Championships U23 - ITT

=== 2017 ===
63rd 84th World Championships - ITT
