= Hippolyte Lazerges =

French painter (1817–1887)

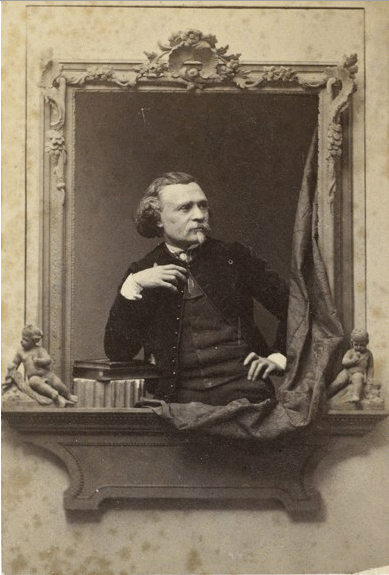
- Photograph by Adolphe Dallemagne (c.1860)
- Born: 5 July 1817; Narbonne, France
- Died: 24 October 1887 (aged 70); Mustapha, Algeria
- Education: David d'Angers, sculptor; François Bouchot painter

Jean Raymond Hippolyte Lazerges (1817–1887) was a French Orientalist painter and songwriter.

== Biography ==
Despite showing some artistic talent his father, who was a baker, refused to let him study drawing. From 1830, he and his family lived in Algeria. In 1838, he went to Paris to begin his mandatory military service.

Upon being discharged, he remained in Paris, where he studied with the sculptor David d'Angers and the painter François Bouchot. He began with religious works, to obtain government commissions for church murals, as his student years had left him in poverty. A notable painting from this period is the "Death of the Virgin", in the chapel at the Palais des Tuileries.

He returned to Algeria in 1861, due to health problems, and began working in the Orientalist genre; creating mostly portraits. Together with Joseph Sintès and Alfred Chataud, he helped to establish the Algerian style of Orientalist painting, characterized by realistic representations of people and places.

Periodically, he returned to France to work on murals. In 1863, he began to create nine episodes from the life of Mary, for the chapel of the Église Notre-Dame-de-Recouvrance d'Orléans, which were completed in 1868. Following the Exposition Universelle of 1867, he was named a Knight in the Legion of Honor. From 1865 to 1869, he provided decorations for the Église Saint-Laurent, also in Orléans.

His students included Paul Dumoulin, Armand Point, Caroline Espinet, and his own son Paul, who also became an Orientalist painter. His works may be seen at the Musée d'Art et d'Histoire de Narbonne, the Musée du Quai Branly, and the Musée d'Orsay.

In addition to painting, he composed numerous vocal melodies, several of which, such as Vive Paris and Retour en France, have become popular. He also set some poems to music, notably Vous n'Étes Rien Près d'Elle by André Chanet. His Éloge du Tabac has been recorded by Paul Van Nevel's Huelgas Ensemble.

== Selected works ==
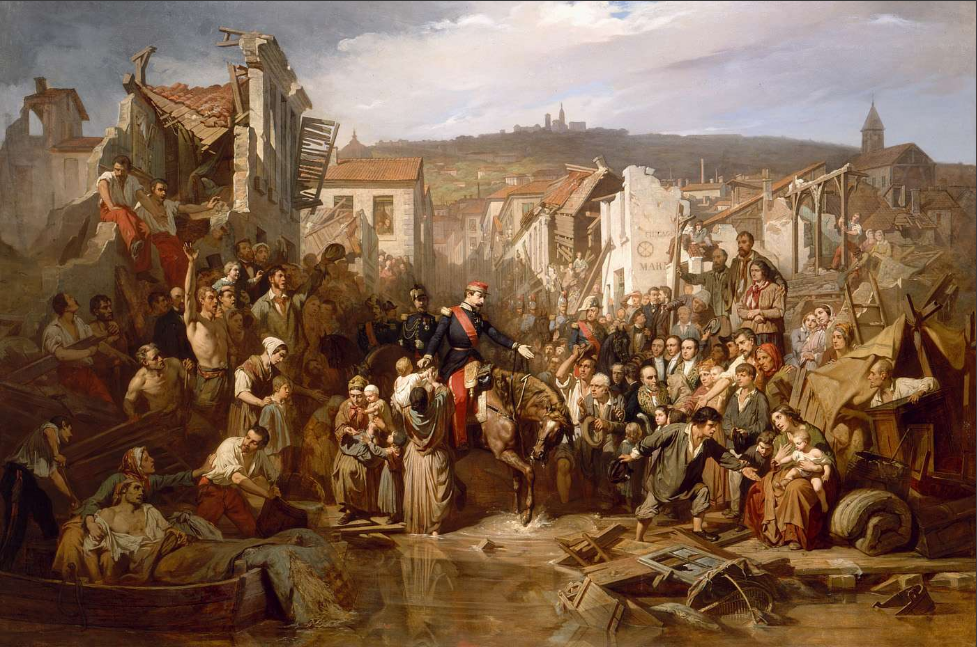
Napoléon III Visiting the Flood Victims in Lyon (1856)

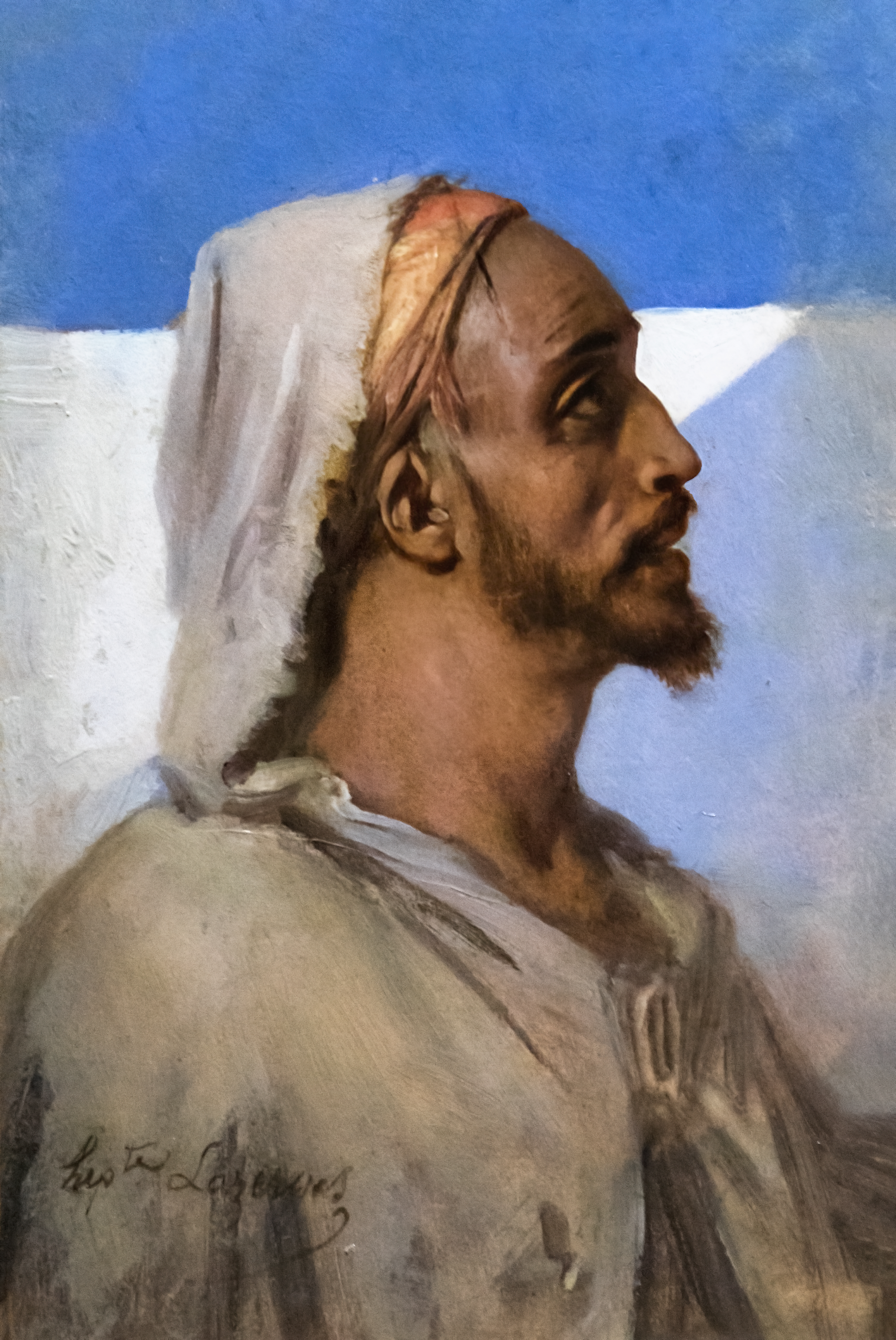
Portrait of an Arab (c.1880)

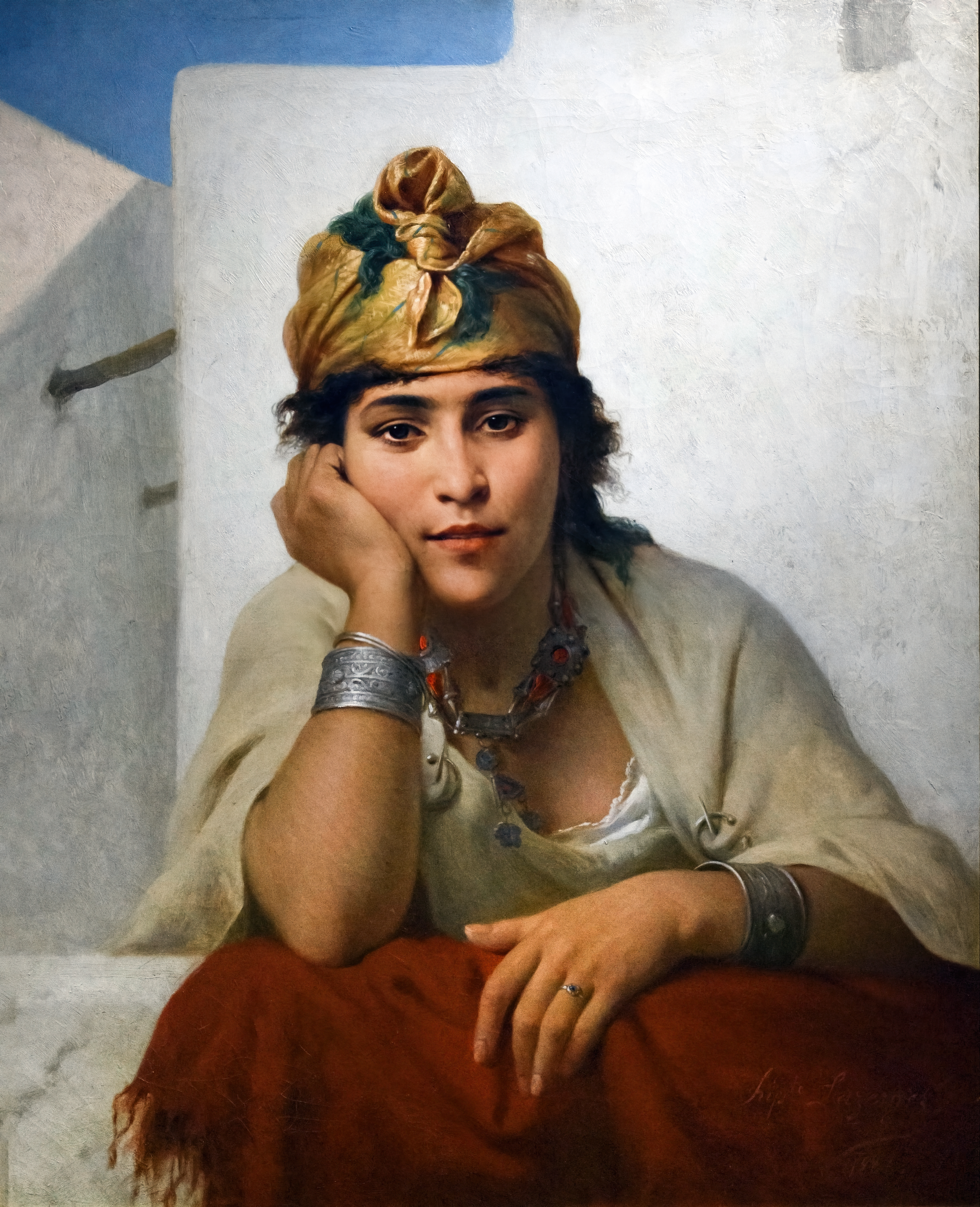
Rêverie (1883)

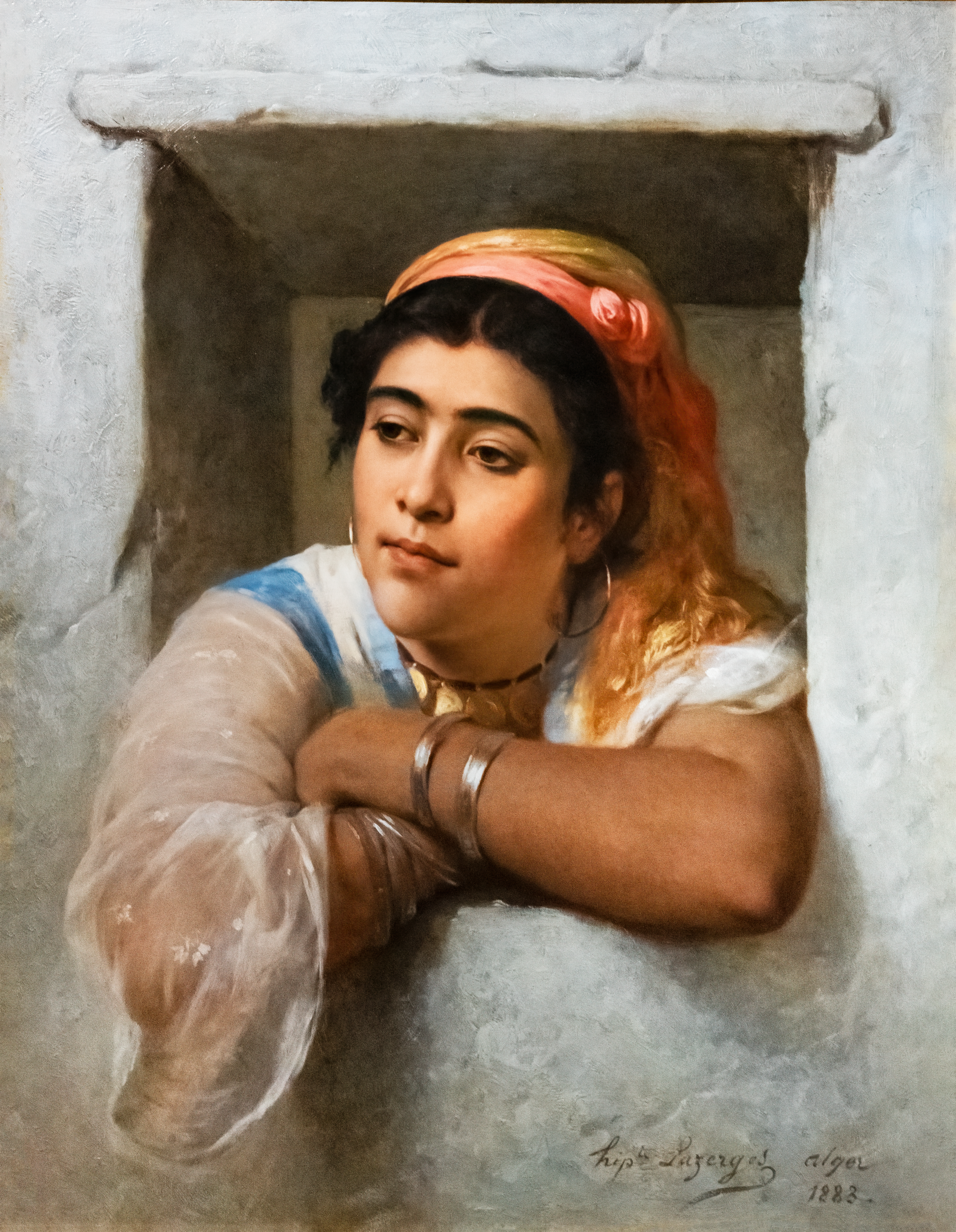
At the Window (1883)

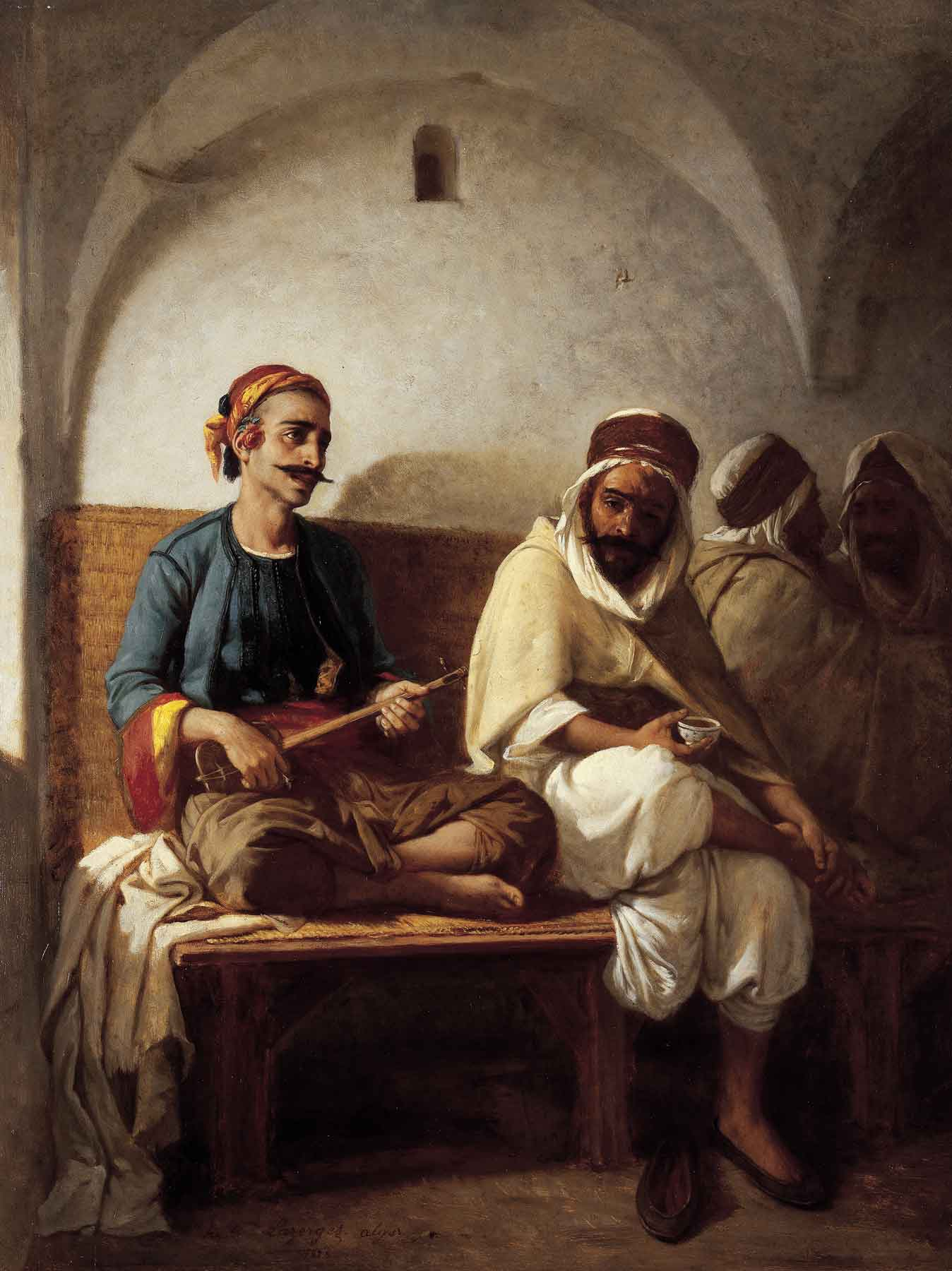
Moorish Café in Algiers (1878)

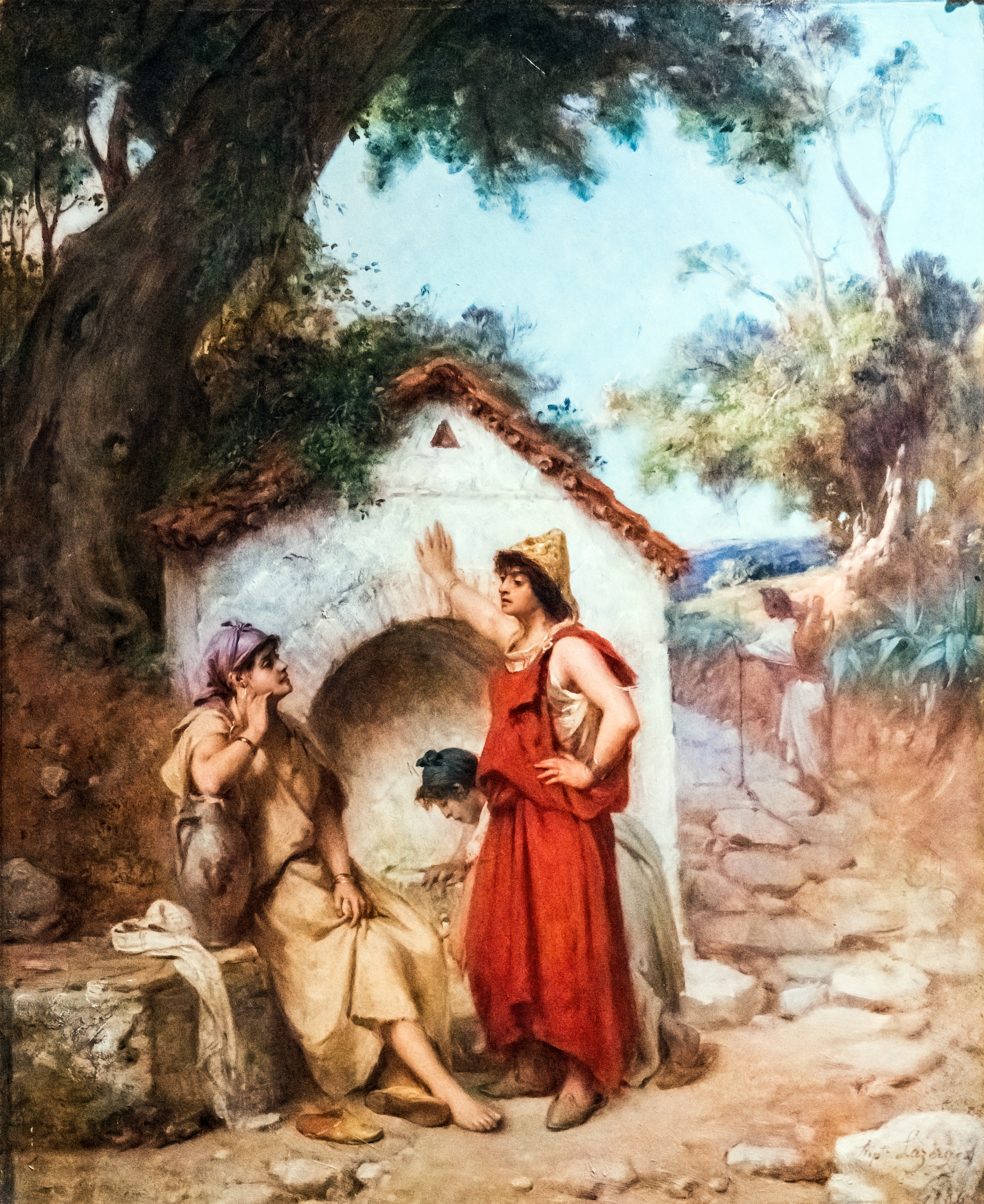
Algerian Women Around the Fountain (c.1886)

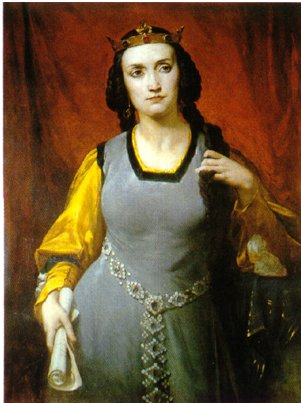
Marie Dorval in the Role of Agnes of Merania (c.1846)
