= 2017 UCI Road World Championships – Men's time trial =

Men's time trial
2017 UCI Road World Championships
- Time trial Rainbow jersey

Race details
- Dates: 20 September 2017
- Stages: 1
- Distance: 31 km (19.26 mi)
- Winning time: 44' 41.00"

Medalists
	Gold	Tom Dumoulin (Netherlands)
	Silver	Primož Roglič (Slovenia)
	Bronze	Chris Froome (Great Britain)

The Men's time trial of the 2017 UCI Road World Championships is a cycling event that took place on 20 September 2017 in Bergen, Norway. It was the 24th edition of the championship; Tom Dumoulin of the Netherlands won his first title.

== Qualification ==
All National Federations were allowed to enter four riders for the race, with a maximum of two riders to start. In addition to this number, the outgoing World Champion and the current continental champions were also able to take part.

Champion	Name	Note
Outgoing World Champion	Tony Martin (GER)	Competed
African Champion	Meron Teshome (ERI)	Competed
European Champion	Victor Campenaerts (BEL)	Competed
Asian Champion	Dmitriy Gruzdev (KAZ)	Competed
Oceanian Champion	Sean Lake (AUS)	Did not compete
Pan American Champion	José Luis Rodríguez Aguilar (CHI)	Did not compete

=== Participating nations ===
65 cyclists from 41 nations were entered in the men's time trial, although Guyana's sole representative Jermaine Burrowes failed to start. The number of cyclists per nation is shown in parentheses.

- Albania (2)
- Argentina (1)
- Australia (1)
- Austria (2)
- Azerbaijan (1)
- Belarus (1)
- Belgium (3)
- Canada (2)
- Colombia (1)
- Czech Republic (1)
- Denmark (2)
- Eritrea (1)
- France (1)
- Germany (3)
- Great Britain (2)
- Guyana (1) (did not start)
- Hong Kong (1)
- Ireland (1)
- Italy (1)
- Kazakhstan (3)
- Lithuania (1)
- Luxembourg (1)
- Mexico (1)
- Netherlands (2)
- New Zealand (1)
- Norway (2)
- Pakistan (2)
- Poland (2)
- Portugal (2)
- Romania (1)
- Russia (2)
- Rwanda (1)
- Singapore (2)
- Slovenia (2)
- South Africa (1)
- Spain (2)
- Switzerland (2)
- Sweden (1)
- Syria (2)
- Ukraine (2)
- United States (2)

== Final classification ==
All 64 starters completed the 31-kilometre (19 mi)-long course.

Rank	Rider	Time
1	(Netherlands) Tom Dumoulin (NED)	44' 41.00"
2	(Slovenia) Primož Roglič (SLO)	+ 57.79"
3	(United Kingdom) Chris Froome (GBR)	+ 1' 21.25"
4	(Portugal) Nelson Oliveira (POR)	+ 1' 28.52"
5	(Belarus) Vasil Kiryienka (BLR)	+ 1' 28.75"
6	(Italy) Gianni Moscon (ITA)	+ 1' 29.49"
7	(Netherlands) Wilco Kelderman (NED)	+ 1' 34.33"
8	(Australia) Rohan Dennis (AUS)	+ 1' 37.39"
9	(Germany) Tony Martin (GER)	+ 1' 39.88"
10	(Slovenia) Jan Tratnik (SLO)	+ 1' 43.45"
11	(Luxembourg) Bob Jungels (LUX)	+ 1' 49.46"
12	(Republic of Ireland) Nicolas Roche (IRL)	+ 1' 53.54"
13	(France) Alexis Gougeard (FRA)	+ 1' 53.97"
14	(Spain) Jonathan Castroviejo (ESP)	+ 2' 01.39"
15	(Russia) Ilnur Zakarin (RUS)	+ 2' 04.44"
16	(Belgium) Victor Campenaerts (BEL)	+ 2' 08.55"
17	(Norway) Edvald Boasson Hagen (NOR)	+ 2' 11.20"
18	(Ukraine) Andriy Hrivko (UKR)	+ 2' 15.13"
19	(Germany) Nikias Arndt (GER)	+ 2' 16.05"
20	(Lithuania) Ignatas Konovalovas (LTU)	+ 2' 21.15"
21	(Denmark) Martin Toft Madsen (DEN)	+ 2' 33.01"
22	(Belgium) Laurens De Plus (BEL)	+ 2' 35.08"
23	(Belgium) Yves Lampaert (BEL)	+ 2' 35.09"
24	(Czech Republic) Jan Bárta (CZE)	+ 2' 39.18"
25	(Switzerland) Stefan Küng (SUI)	+ 2' 45.53"
26	(United States) Tejay van Garderen (USA)	+ 2' 47.54"
27	(Spain) Gorka Izagirre (ESP)	+ 2' 48.78"
28	(Kazakhstan) Alexey Lutsenko (KAZ)	+ 3' 04.60"
29	(Canada) Hugo Houle (CAN)	+ 3' 06.61"
30	(Russia) Alexander Evtushenko (RUS)	+ 3' 06.94"
31	(Norway) Andreas Vangstad (NOR)	+ 3' 09.38"
32	(Sweden) Tobias Ludvigsson (SWE)	+ 3' 09.58"
33	(Portugal) Rui Costa (POR)	+ 3' 10.54"
34	(Denmark) Lasse Norman Hansen (DEN)	+ 3' 21.23"
35	(Germany) Jasha Sütterlin (GER)	+ 3' 28.07"
36	(Poland) Mateusz Taciak (POL)	+ 3' 28.87"
37	(Argentina) Eduardo Sepúlveda (ARG)	+ 3' 31.52"
38	(Kazakhstan) Dmitriy Gruzdev (KAZ)	+ 3' 33.31"
39	(New Zealand) Hamish Bond (NZL)	+ 3' 33.92"
40	(Switzerland) Reto Hollenstein (SUI)	+ 3' 34.04"
41	(United States) Joey Rosskopf (USA)	+ 3' 47.20"
42	(Romania) Serghei Țvetcov (ROU)	+ 3' 49.48"
43	(United Kingdom) Tao Geoghegan Hart (GBR)	+ 3' 50.67"
44	(Kazakhstan) Zhandos Bizhigitov (KAZ)	+ 4' 01.37"
45	(Colombia) Jarlinson Pantano (COL)	+ 4' 10.63"
46	(Austria) Lukas Pöstlberger (AUT)	+ 4' 14.41"
47	(Austria) Riccardo Zoidl (AUT)	+ 4' 46.43"
48	(Canada) Rob Britton (CAN)	+ 4' 57.29"
49	(South Africa) Willie Smit (RSA)	+ 5' 27.33"
50	(Poland) Maciej Bodnar (POL)	+ 6' 02.24"
51	(Albania) Redi Halilaj (ALB)	+ 6' 03.03"
52	(Rwanda) Valens Ndayisenga (RWA)	+ 6' 05.86"
53	(Ukraine) Kostyantyn Rybaruk (UKR)	+ 7' 35.60"
54	(Hong Kong) Cheung King Lok (HKG)	+ 8' 14.25"
55	(Mexico) Uri Martins (MEX)	+ 8' 22.59"
56	(Syria) Nazir Jaser (SYR)	+ 8' 34.66"
57	(Azerbaijan) Elchin Asadov (AZE)	+ 9' 00.48"
58	(Albania) Eugert Zhupa (ALB)	+ 9' 15.43"
59	(Eritrea) Meron Teshome (ERI)	+ 9' 49.40"
60	(Syria) Ahmad Wais (SYR)	+ 10' 57.98"
61	(Pakistan) Arsalan Anjum Muhammad (PAK)	+ 11' 47.78"
62	(Singapore) Gabriel Tan (SIN)	+ 12' 46.53"
63	(Pakistan) Awais Khan (PAK)	+ 12' 51.92"
64	(Singapore) Teoh Yi Peng (SIN)	+ 13' 00.32"
	(Guyana) Jermaine Burrowes (GUY)	DNS
