= Caroline Espinet =

French painter

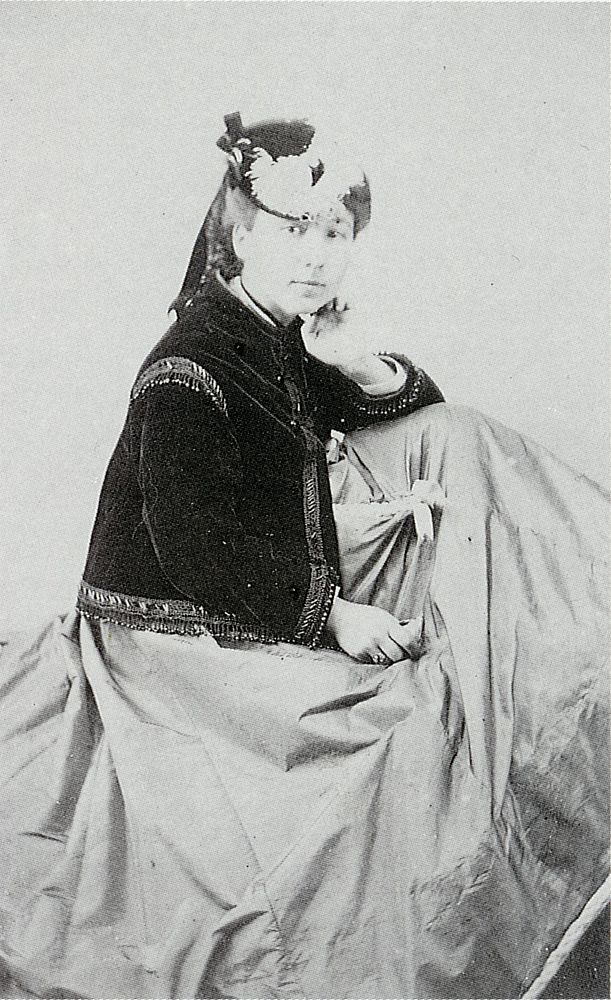
Caroline Espinet (date unknown)

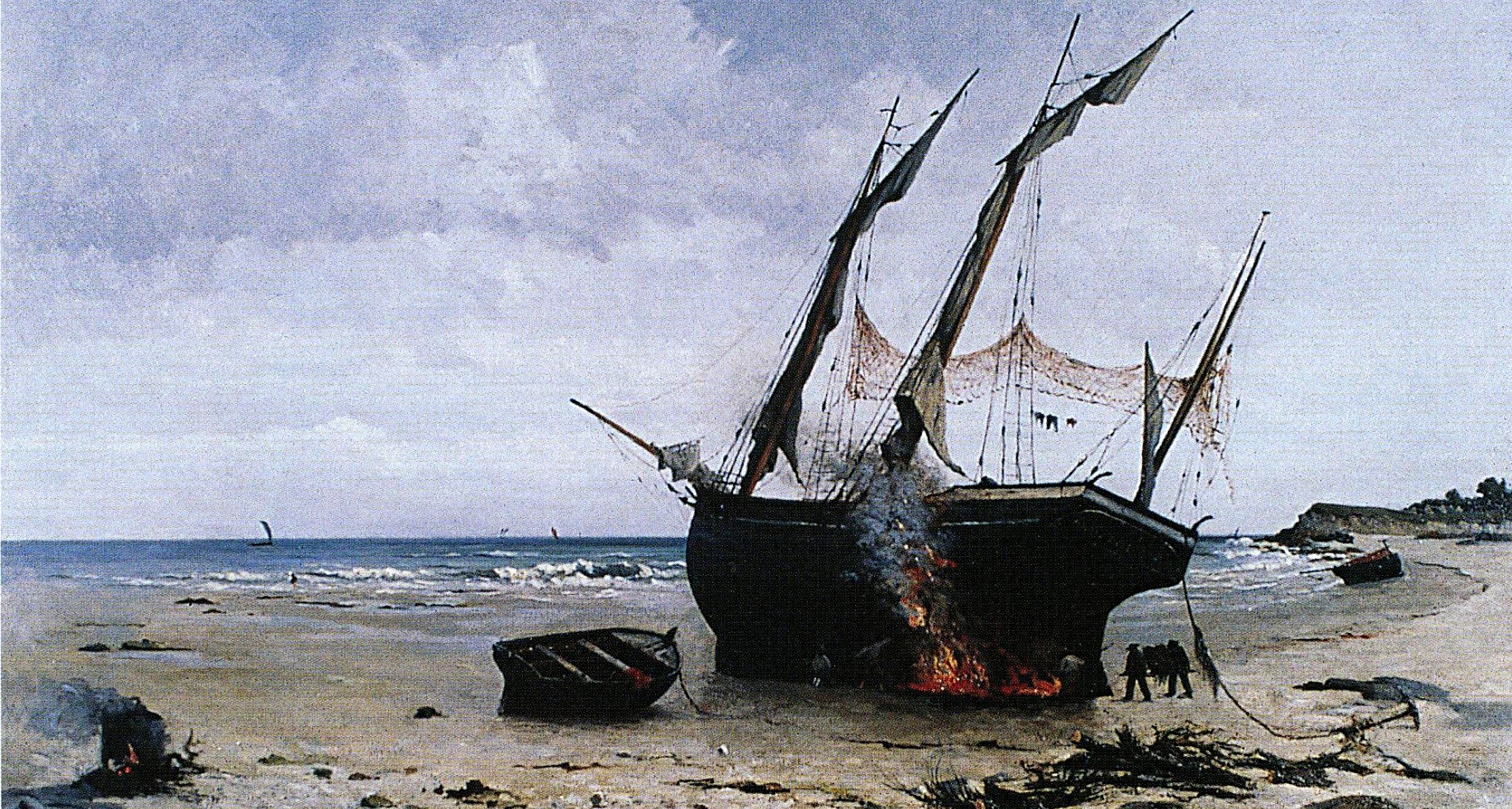
The Buckling of a Lugger

Caroline Espinet, née Jacquier (29 March 1844, Lyon - 3 November 1912, Nantes) was a French painter.

== Biography ==
She was born to Pierre Victor Jacquier (1799-1881), an army doctor, and his wife Marie-Louise, née Le Nézet.

During the 1860s, she and her sister Élodie took drawing lessons from the painter and photographer, Ernest Corroller (1822-1893). She then took lessons from the Orientalist painter, Hippolyte Lazerges.

In 1868, she married Paul Durand, who died the following year. She remarried in 1873, to Charles Espinet, a naval lieutenant, who became the captain of a frigate in 1879.

She held her first exhibit at the Salon of 1875; having showings there and at various other venues until 1899. Overall, however, she pursued her career in a fairly discreet manner. The majority of her paintings have maritime themes, most likely due to her husband's interests.

During the 1880s, both sisters lived in Saint-Pierre-Quiberon, near where her husband was stationed. They exhibited together at a salon sponsored by the Union of Women Painters and Sculptors in 1882.

In 1900, she took in the two daughters of her niece, the pianist Rita Strohl, following the death of Rita's husband Émile, an army lieutenant. Her husband Charles would live until 1926.

Many of her paintings may be seen at the Musée de la Compagnie des Indes. In 1943, her family home was hit by a bombardment and a large number of her works were destroyed.
