= Paul Lazerges =

French painter

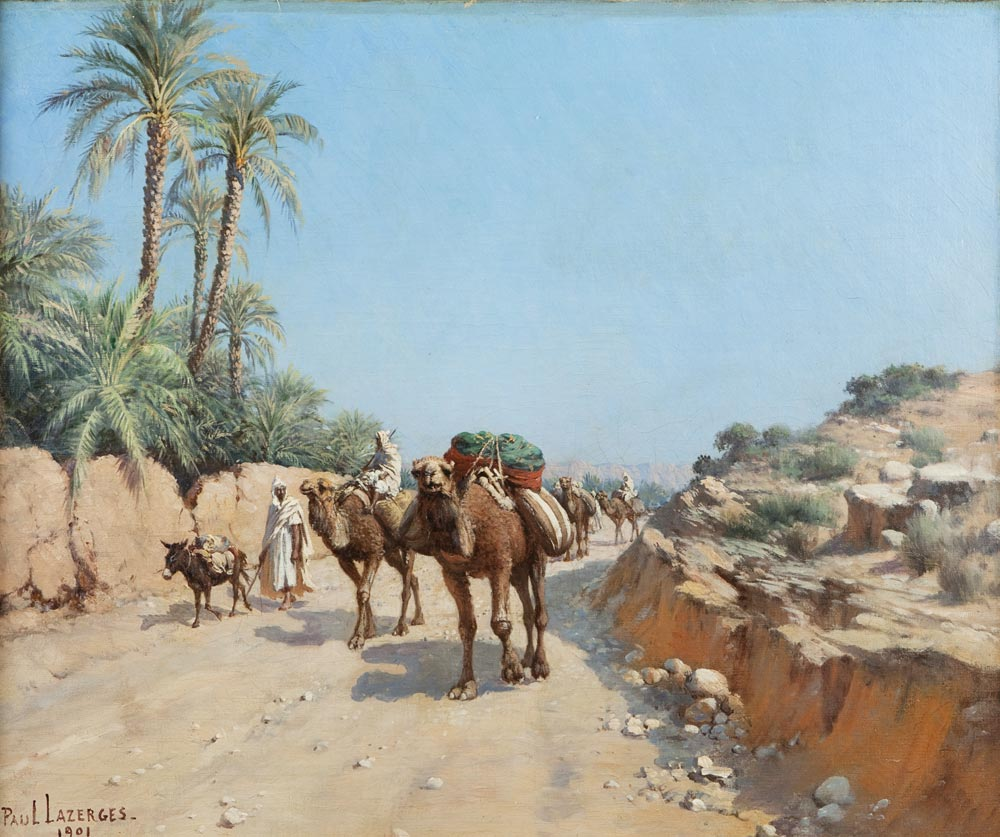
Caravan (1901)

Jean-Baptiste Paul Lazerges ( 10 January 1845, Paris — 21 May 1902, Asnières-sur-Seine) was a French painter. He studied with his father, Hippolyte Lazerges. His 1880 portrait of Sarah Bernhardt was particularly noted, although most of his works are in the Orientalist genre.
