= Tom Dumoulin =

Dutch road cyclist

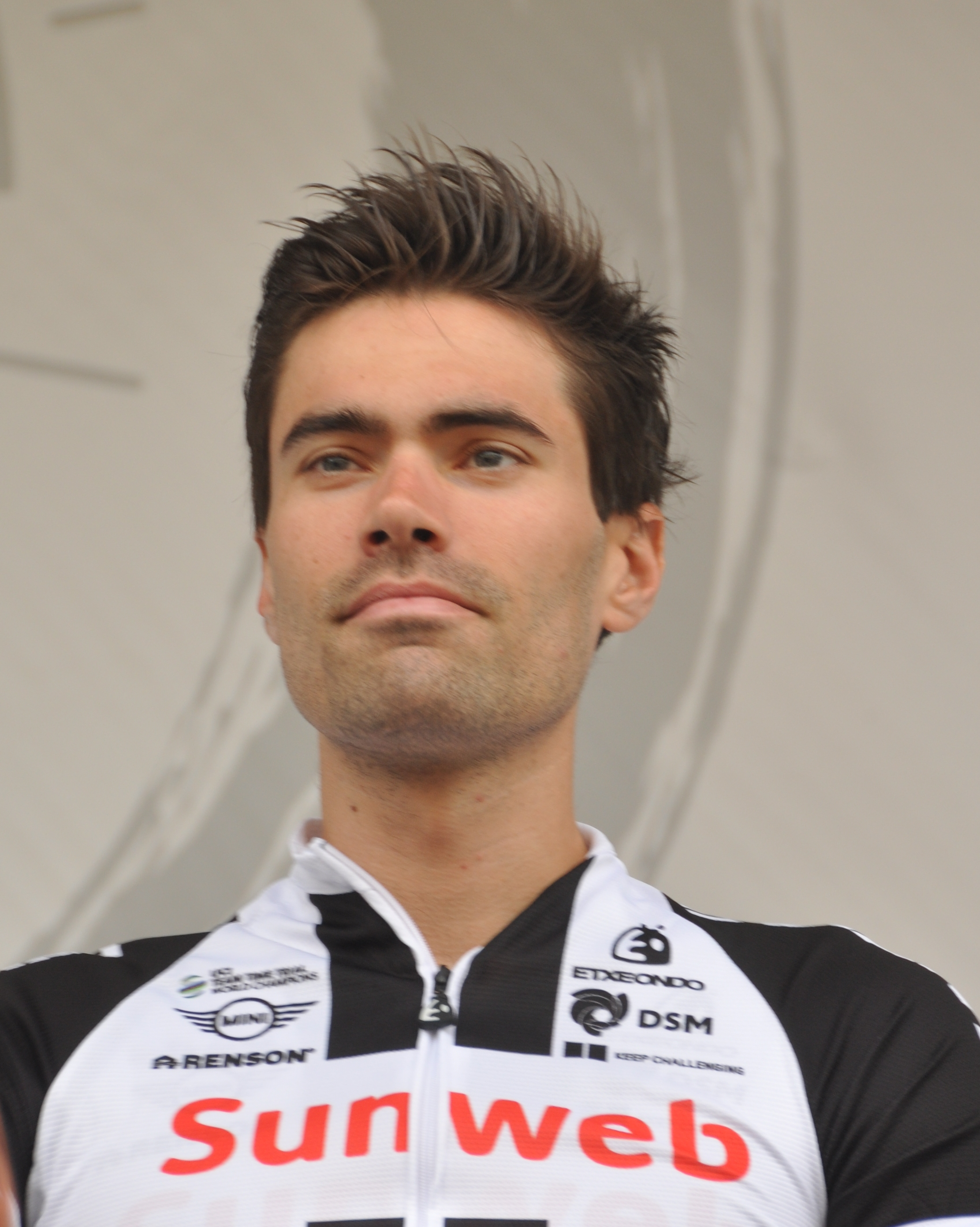
- Dumoulin at the 2018 Deutschland Tour

Personal information
- Full name: Tom Dumoulin
- Born: 11 November 1990 (age 35) Maastricht, Netherlands
- Height: 1.85 m (6 ft 1 in)
- Weight: 69 kg (152 lb; 10 st 12 lb)

Cycling career
- Sport: Cycling
- Discipline: Road
- Role: Rider
- Rider type: Time-trialist; All-rounder

Amateur team
- 2009–2010: PPL–Belisol

Professional teams
- 2011: Rabobank Continental Team
- 2012–2019: Project 1t4i
- 2020–2022: Team Jumbo–Visma

Major wins
- Grand Tours Tour de France 3 individual stages (2016, 2018) Giro d'Italia General classification (2017) 4 individual stages (2016, 2017, 2018) Vuelta a España 2 individual stages (2015) Stage races BinckBank Tour (2017) One-day races and Classics World Time Trial Championships (2017) National Time Trial Championships (2014, 2016, 2017, 2021)
Medal record
Representing Netherlands
Men's road bicycle racing
Olympic Games
Silver medal – second place	2016 Rio de Janeiro	Time trial
Silver medal – second place	2020 Tokyo	Time trial
World Championships
Gold medal – first place	2017 Bergen	Time trial
Silver medal – second place	2018 Innsbruck	Time trial
Bronze medal – third place	2014 Ponferrada	Time trial
Representing Team Sunweb
World Championships
Gold medal – first place	2017 Bergen	Team time trial
Silver medal – second place	2018 Innsbruck	Team time trial

Tom Dumoulin (Dutch pronunciation: [ˈtɔm dymuˈlɛ̃ː]; born 11 November 1990) is a retired Dutch professional road bicycle racer who last rode for UCI WorldTeam Visma–Lease a Bike. He has won the Giro d'Italia and nine stages across the three Grand Tours, five medals in three different World Championships and two Olympic silver medals.

Known for his time-trialing ability, Dumoulin excelled in climbing and was viewed by many as a climbing specialist. At the 2015 Vuelta a España, Dumoulin had two stage victories and led the race into its final weekend, before losing four minutes on the penultimate stage and ultimately finished sixth overall. He led the 2016 Giro d'Italia during its opening week and won two stages at the 2016 Tour de France. His sole Grand Tour in 2017 was the Giro d'Italia, where he overcame stomach problems and a 53-second deficit entering the final stage to become the first Dutch winner of the race and the first Dutch Grand Tour winner since Joop Zoetemelk in 1980. Later that year, he became the first Dutch male to win the time trial at the UCI Road World Championships. In 2018, Dumoulin finished second overall at both the Giro d'Italia and the Tour de France.

Dumoulin missed the first half of the 2021 season after he took an indefinite break from cycling for personal reasons, ultimately making his return to the sport at the Tour de Suisse in June and winning his fourth Dutch National Time Trial Championships later that month. The following year, he announced that he would retire from the sport at the end of the 2022 season before retiring early on the 15th of August.

== Early life ==
Dumoulin was born in Maastricht, and grew up in the city near the Maas Boulevard, which used to host the finish of the Amstel Gold Race. Originally his ambition was to study medicine and become a doctor, but after not being offered a place at medical school he began a Health Sciences degree. Dumoulin did not enjoy classes and within a year he opted to pursue cycle racing for a year.

== Professional career ==
=== Early career ===
Dumoulin first made an impact in 2010, when he competed at the Grand Prix du Portugal, part of the UCI Under 23 Nations' Cup – Dumoulin won the race's opening time trial, despite never having ridden a time trial bicycle before, and went on to win the race overall. Later that year he won a time trial stage of the Girobio. He was due to ride for Cervélo TestTeam in 2011, however the team disbanded at the end of the 2010 season. He rode for the Rabobank Continental Team in 2011.

=== Project 1t4i (2012–19) ===
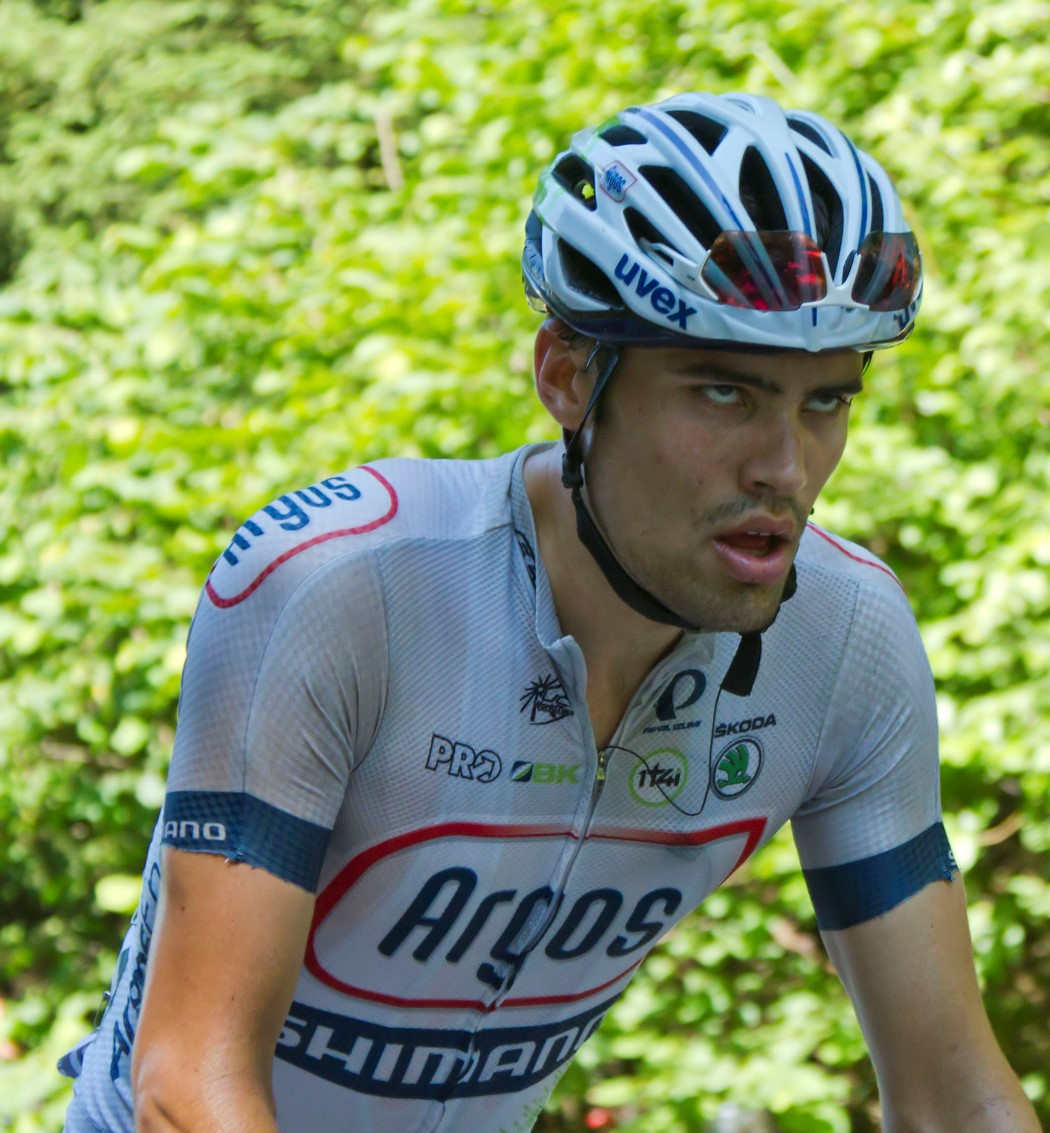
Dumoulin at the 2013 Tour de France

Dumoulin turned professional with the Dutch Project 1t4i team in 2012. Although he did not win any races in his first two seasons as a professional, he began to make his mark in major races, especially in time trials. He made his grand tour debut in 2012, riding the Vuelta a España.

==== 2014 ====
In June, Dumoulin won the Dutch National Time Trial Championships. In September, he finished in second place at the Grand Prix Cycliste de Québec after surging ahead on the last climb but was passed by Simon Gerrans before the finish. Later that month he won bronze in the UCI World Time Trial Championships, placing third behind Bradley Wiggins and Tony Martin in Ponferrada, Spain.

==== 2015 ====
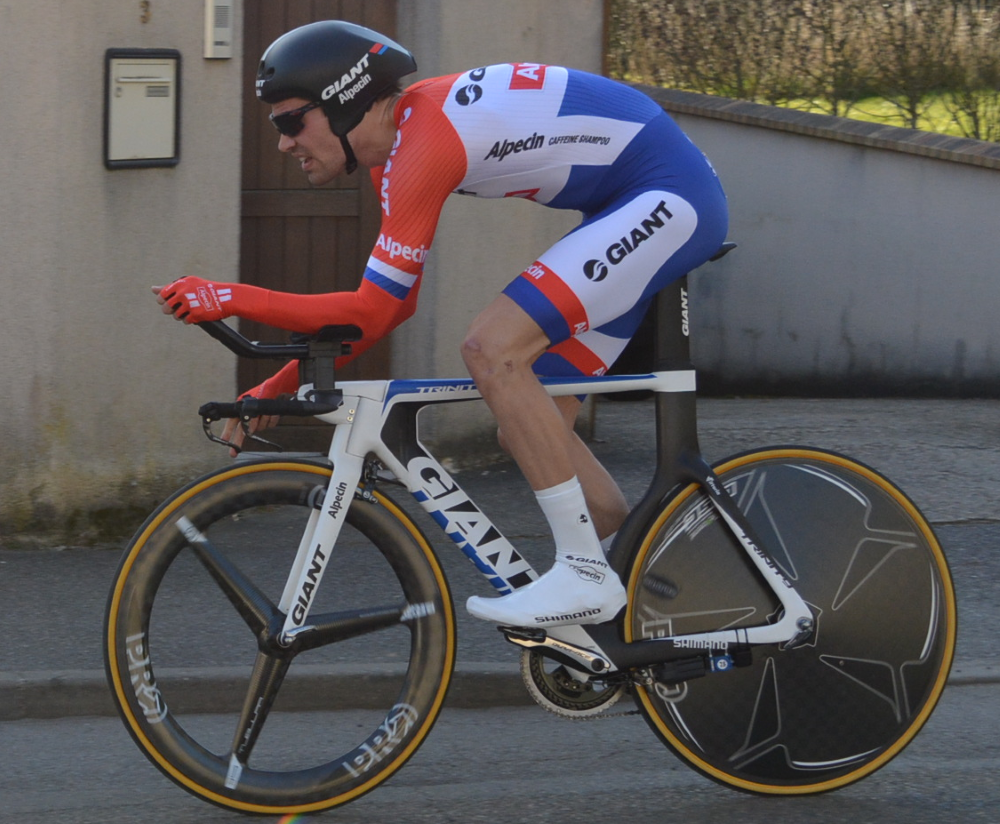
Dumoulin wearing the Dutch national champion's skinsuit at the 2015 Paris–Nice

Dumoulin started the 2015 season by finishing fourth overall at the Tour Down Under. He took his first success of the season by winning the final individual time trial on the Tour of the Basque Country. His second victory of the year came at the Tour de Suisse, where he won the prologue with a two-second advantage over Fabian Cancellara. He also won the closing stage of that race, a 38.4-kilometre (23.9-mile) time trial he covered at an average speed of 47.407 km/h (29.5 mph). In the Tour de France, Dumoulin was one of the favourites to take victory in the opening time trial on home soil in Utrecht, the Netherlands, but ultimately finished fourth. On stage 3, he was involved in a massive, high-speed crash and had to abandon the race.

Dumoulin recovered from his injuries to ride the Vuelta a España. On stage 2, he attacked on the final climb to Caminito del Rey and formed a group with Nicolas Roche (Team Sky) and Nairo Quintana (Movistar Team), but was caught and passed by Esteban Chaves (Orica–GreenEDGE), who won the stage ahead of Dumoulin in second. On stage 5 there was a split in the peloton, and Chaves lost six seconds to Dumoulin, who took the race lead by 1 second. However, Chaves won stage 6 ahead of Dumoulin in third to re-take the leader's red jersey. Stage 9 was another first-category summit finish. There was a series of attacks on the early part of the climb, with many riders dropped from the lead group. Dumoulin eventually took a solo win in the stage, two seconds ahead of Chris Froome (Team Sky) and took back the red jersey as Chaves lost significant time. Froome had originally been dropped, but rode at a steady tempo and came close to winning the stage before Dumoulin outsprinted him in the final hundred metres.

After Froome crashed out on stage 11, Dumoulin limited his losses on the following mountain stages, as Fabio Aru (Astana) and Joaquim Rodríguez (Team Katusha) traded the race lead. On Stage 17, Dumoulin won the 38.1-kilometre (23.7-mile) individual time trial. He gained 1 minute and 53 seconds on Aru to take the red jersey by three seconds over Aru, with Rodríguez 1 minute and 15 seconds back in third overall after losing over 3 minutes to Dumoulin on the stage. Dumoulin doubled his lead over Aru by gaining three seconds through an attack on stage 19's final cobbled climb, however he lost the race to Aru on stage 20, the Vuelta's last mountain stage, where Aru distanced Dumoulin on the third of the stage's four first-category climbs. Dumoulin lost almost four minutes to Aru and slipped down to sixth place in the general classification. In December, he won the Gerrit Schulte Trophy, the award for the best Dutch cyclist of the year.

==== 2016 ====
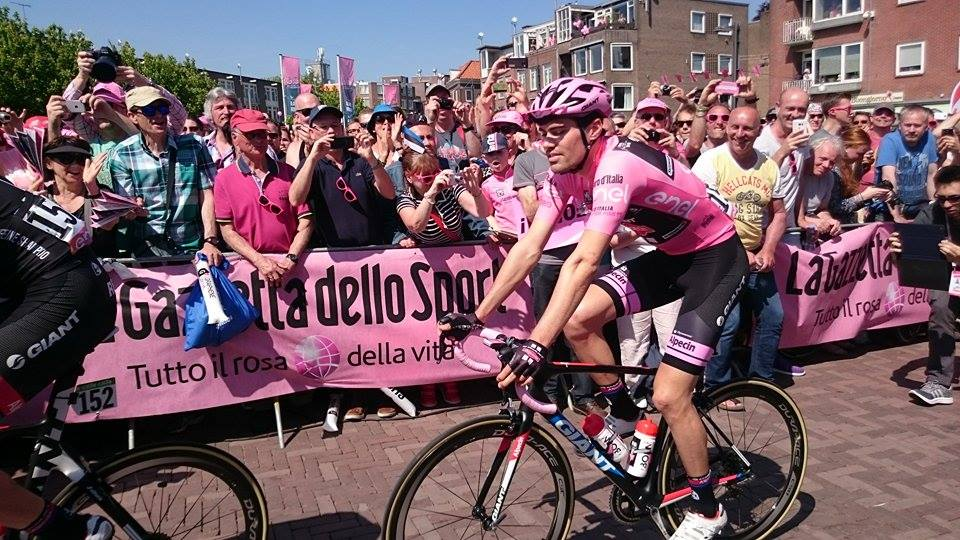
Dumoulin wearing the maglia rosa of general classification leader, at the 2016 Giro d'Italia

He was named in the start list for the Giro d'Italia, where he won the opening time trial on home soil in Apeldoorn, the Netherlands, to take the maglia rosa. On stage 8, Dumoulin lost the race lead after finishing 38th and losing 1 minute and 10 seconds to Alejandro Valverde (Movistar Team) in a hilly stage with portions of strade bianche (English: white roads) during the stage. He abandoned the race on stage 11.

Dumoulin also rode the Tour de France. He won stage 9 after attacking from a breakaway on the lower slopes of Arcalis in Andorra, and riding up the climb solo in torrential rain. Dumoulin also won stage 13, a 37.5-kilometre (23.3-mile) time trial over hilly terrain in windy conditions, by a margin of over a minute to Chris Froome in second place. Despite a broken wrist, he won the silver medal in the time trial at the 2016 Olympic Games in Rio de Janeiro, behind Fabian Cancellara.

==== 2017: Giro d'Italia victory and World Time Trial Champion ====
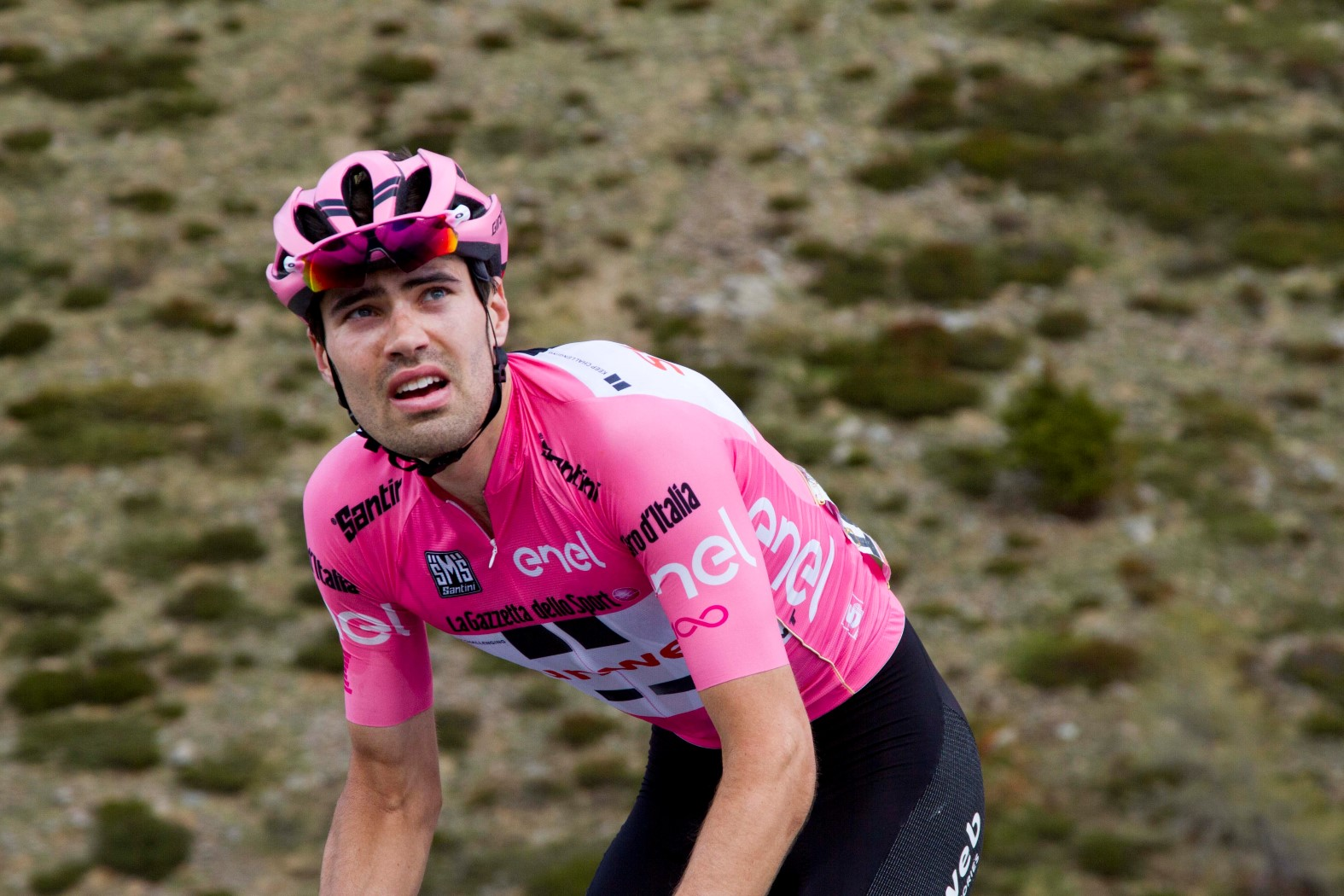
Dumoulin wearing the maglia rosa of general classification leader, at the 2017 Giro d'Italia

Dumoulin's team announced in the winter that he would target the Giro d'Italia, held in May. On Stage 9, Dumoulin finished third on the summit finish at Blockhaus, finishing alongside Thibaut Pinot (FDJ), 24 seconds down on the stage winner and new race leader Nairo Quintana (Movistar Team). Dumoulin then won stage 10, a 39.8-kilometre (24.7-mile) individual time trial (ITT) from Foligno to Montefalco, to take the overall race lead by 2 minutes and 23 seconds over Quintana. Dumoulin won Stage 14, which featured a mountain top finish at Santuario di Oropa to extend his lead over Quintana by a further 14 seconds. On Stage 16, Dumoulin experienced stomach problems and had to defecate at the foot of the Umbrail Pass; none of the other contenders waited for Dumoulin and he finished more than two minutes down on stage winner Vincenzo Nibali (Bahrain–Merida), keeping his race lead by just 31 seconds over Quintana. Dumoulin defended his lead until the stage 19 mountain finish in Piancavallo, where he crossed the line over a minute behind Quintana, the new race leader. Quintana would put fifteen more seconds into Dumoulin the following day on stage 20. However, Dumoulin's performance on stage 21, a 29-kilometre (18-mile) individual time trial in which he finished second, took him from fourth to first place in the general classification, becoming the first Dutchman to win the Giro d'Italia and the first to win a Grand Tour since Joop Zoetemelk won the 1980 Tour de France.

As a result of his victory, he was appointed a Knight of the Order of Orange-Nassau by King Willem-Alexander of the Netherlands and Limburgian by Merit. He also received the Honorary Gold Medal of the City of Maastricht.

To finish off his successful season, Dumoulin went on to win September's individual time trial at the World Championships in Bergen, Norway, his first individual world championship victory. He also won the earlier team time trial championships in that event, as part of Team Sunweb.

==== 2018 ====
===== Giro d'Italia =====
Dumoulin entered the Giro d'Italia as the defending champion, and was considered one of the favourites for overall victory, along with Chris Froome (Team Sky), who had won the 2017 Tour de France and 2017 Vuelta a España and was therefore aiming to hold all Grand Tour titles simultaneously. Dumoulin won the opening 9.7-kilometre (6.0-mile) individual time trial in Jerusalem, beating Rohan Dennis (BMC Racing Team) to victory by 2 seconds to take the race leader's Maglia Rosa for the third year in a row. Dennis took the race lead from Dumoulin on Stage 2, after picking up bonus seconds in an intermediate sprint. Dumoulin remained second overall behind Dennis until Stage 6, when Simon Yates (Mitchelton–Scott) attacked from the group of favourites 1.5 kilometres (0.93 miles) from the summit of Mount Etna to take the race lead ahead of Dumoulin in second. Yates won stage 9 after accelerating away with 100 metres (330 feet) to go on the summit finish to Gran Sasso d'Italia, extending his lead over Dumoulin. Yates claimed his second stage victory on Stage 11, attacking with 1.5 kilometres (0.93 miles) to go and holding off a pursuit by Dumoulin to win on a hill-top finish in Osimo to further increase his lead over Dumoulin. On Stage 14, Yates dropped Dumoulin to finish second behind solo winner Froome on Monte Zoncolan. With six bonus seconds for finishing second, Yates extended his overall advantage over Dumoulin to 1 minute and 24 seconds, whilst his gap over Froome was 3 minutes 10 seconds.

On the following stage, Yates rode away from Dumoulin and the other contenders to take a solo win on stage 15 to Sappada, after attacking with 18 kilometres (11 miles) remaining. This victory saw his lead over Dumoulin increase to 2 minutes and 11 seconds. On Stage 17, a 34.2-kilometre (21.3-mile) individual time trial from Trento to Rovereto, Dumoulin finished third behind Rohan Dennis, and reduced Yates' overall lead to 56 seconds, with Froome lying fourth, another 2 minutes and 56 seconds behind Dumoulin. On stage 18 to Prato Nevoso Yates appeared to crack on the final slopes of the summit finish and lost 28 seconds to Dumoulin and Froome. Stage 19 of the race had been classified as the 'queen stage' of the race, with three focused climbs in the latter half of the stage: the half paved-half gravel climb of the Colle delle Finestre, followed by the climb to Sestriere and the final uphill finish to Bardonecchia. Yates cracked on the lower slopes of the Finestre, putting Dumoulin in the virtual race lead, before Froome launched a solo attack further up the climb with 80 kilometres (50 miles) left of the stage. Froome's advantage grew throughout the second half of the stage, as Dumoulin gave chase in a group also containing Thibaut Pinot and Sébastien Reichenbach of Groupama–FDJ, Miguel Ángel López of Astana and Richard Carapaz of Movistar Team. Froome eventually took the stage victory by more than three minutes and thereby also taking the overall race lead, 40 seconds ahead of Dumoulin, who was attacked by the other riders on the final climb after having set the pace for much of the chase. In a post-stage interview, Dumoulin stated that there was nothing that he could have done to stop Froome. Dumoulin attacked Froome several times on Stage 20 but was unable to force a gap, and ultimately finished second overall behind Froome.

===== Tour de France =====
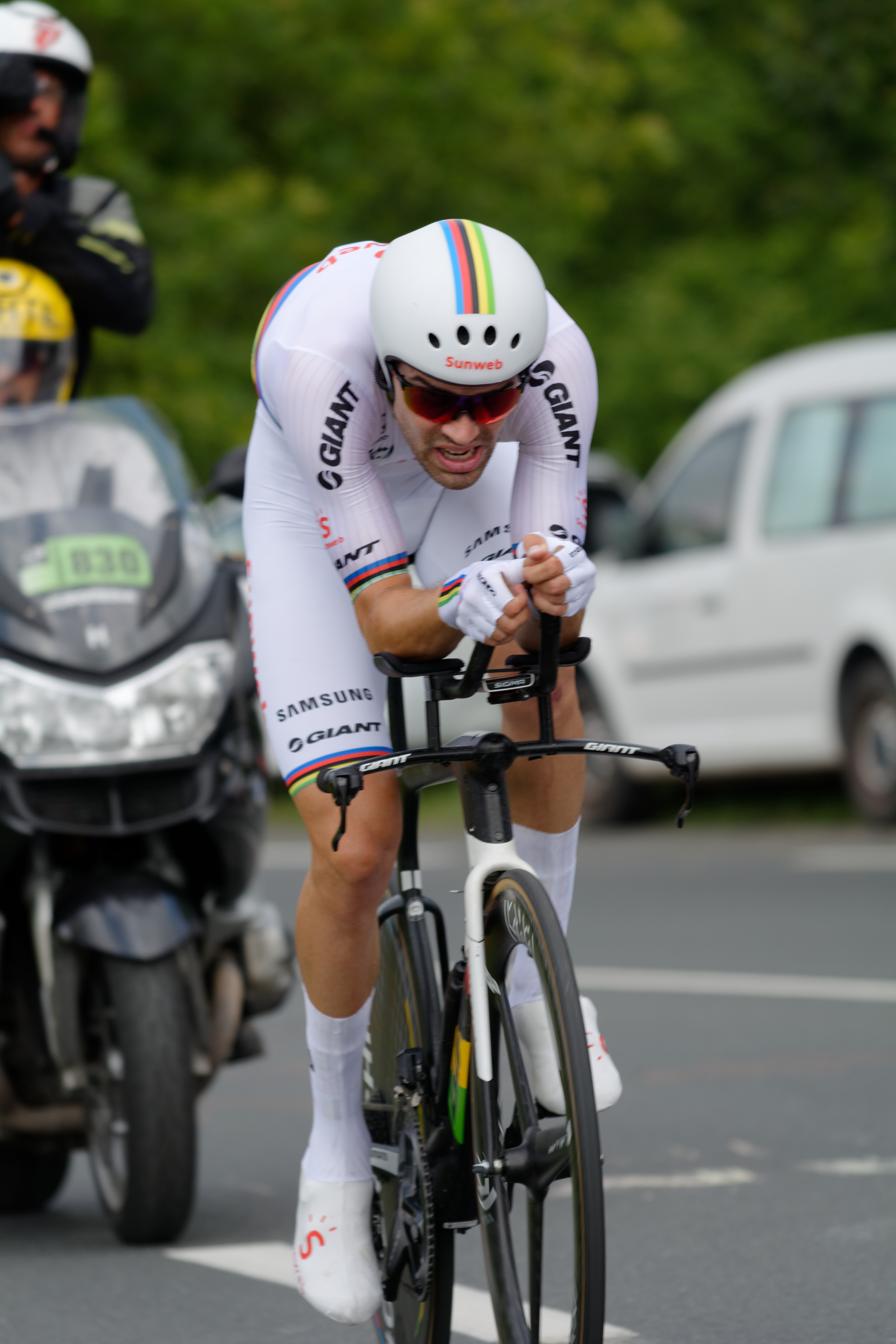
Dumoulin wearing the rainbow jersey, as the incumbent world time trial champion, during Stage 20 of the 2018 Tour de France

Following the Giro, Dumoulin confirmed his participation in the Tour de France, targeting a high general classification placing. On Stage 6, Dumoulin suffered a mechanical issue late in the stage in the run in to the finish at Mûr-de-Bretagne, which saw him lose time to the other contenders; he was also penalised 20 seconds for drafting behind his team car in his attempt to limit his time losses. On Stage 11 in the Alps, Dumoulin launched an attack on a descent with teammate Søren Kragh Andersen before pressing on alone on the final steep finishing climb to La Rosière. Behind him, Geraint Thomas (Team Sky) attacked from the group of favourites, including his teammate Chris Froome, 6 kilometres (3.7 miles) from the finish and caught Dumoulin before attacking again in the final kilometre to distance Dumoulin, who was soon caught by Froome. Thomas, Dumoulin and Froome all passed lone breakaway rider Mikel Nieve (Mitchelton–Scott) in sight of the finish line, with Thomas taking the stage win and Dumoulin finishing second, 20 seconds behind. Thomas took the race leader's yellow jersey by 1 minute and 24 seconds over Froome, with Dumoulin third overall, 1 minute and 44 seconds behind Thomas.

On the following day, Stage 12, Dumoulin again finished second to Thomas, in a sprint finish at Alpe d'Huez. Thomas, Dumoulin and Froome arose as the likely contenders for overall victory in Paris. On Stage 17, the first of the three Pyrenean stages, a 65-kilometre (40-mile) stage to the summit of the Col de Portet, Thomas extended his lead by placing third behind stage winner Nairo Quintana of Movistar Team. Froome's challenge faded on the approach to the summit and he dropped to third position in the general classification, 2:31 behind Thomas. Dumoulin moved into second place, 1:59 off the lead. On the mountainous stage nineteen from Lourdes to Laruns, Primož Roglič of LottoNL–Jumbo attacked on the final climb, the Col d'Aubisque, and soloed to the finish nineteen seconds ahead of the chasing group of overall favourites. Thomas was able to consolidate his position in the yellow jersey by picking up six bonus seconds in the sprint thereby extending his lead over Dumoulin to 2 minutes, 5 seconds. The penultimate stage was a 31-kilometre (19-mile) time trial, Dumoulin won the stage, one second ahead of Froome. Dumoulin finished safely on Stage 21 to secure second place overall behind Thomas, his second successive second place in Grand Tours.

==== 2019 ====
Dumoulin crashed towards the end of Stage 4 of the Giro d'Italia and eventually finished the stage four minutes after many other favorites had crossed the line. Dumoulin officially withdrew after only a few kilometers of Stage 5, stating that the pain was too much to continue. Dumoulin also missed the Tour de France as a result of his injuries.

=== Team Jumbo–Visma (2020–22) ===
In August 2019, it was announced that Dumoulin would join Team Jumbo–Visma on a three-year contract from the 2020 season onwards.

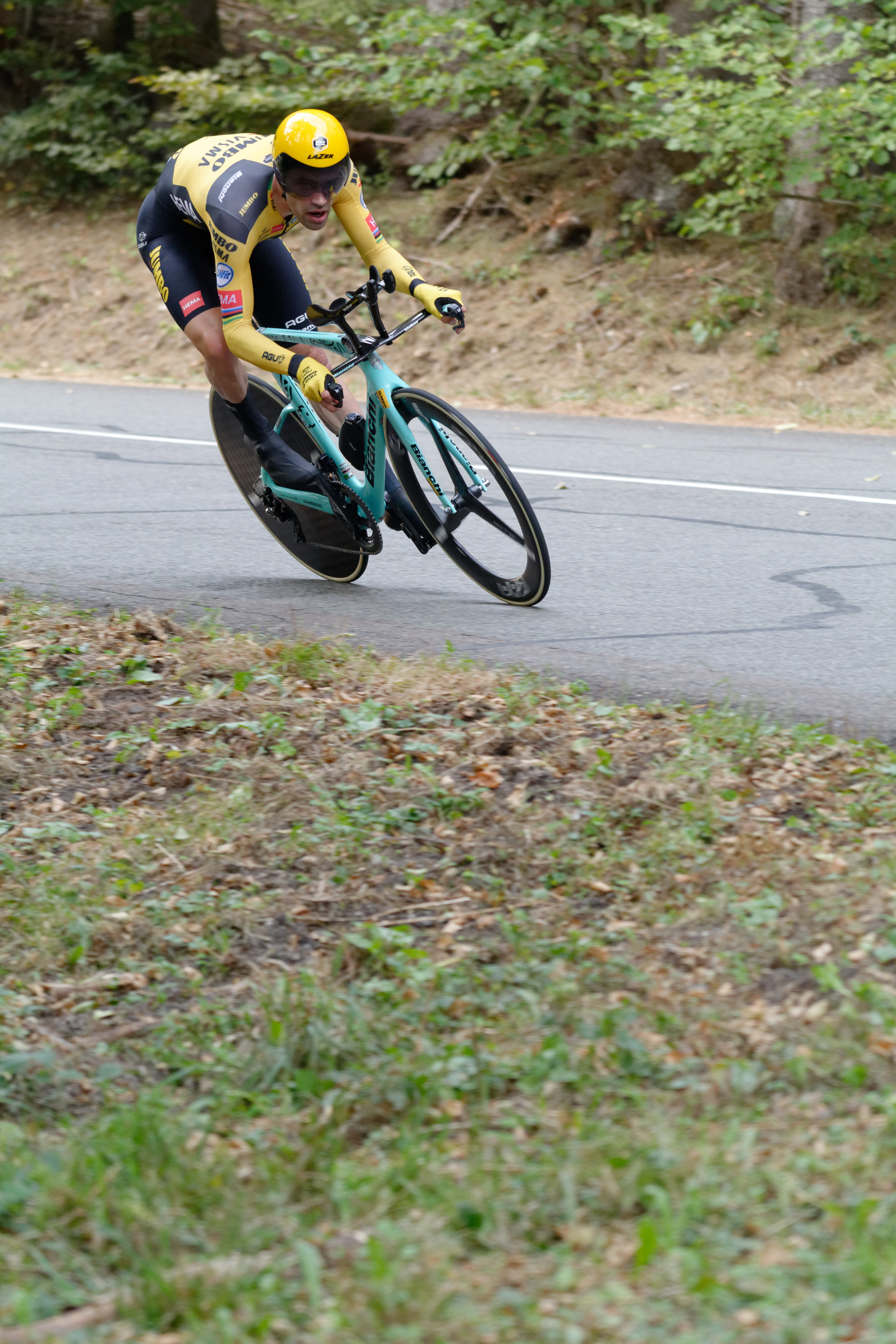
Dumoulin at the 2020 Tour de France

Dumoulin and his team announced he would take an indefinite leave from the sport in January 2021. Dumoulin indicated he needed time to better understand his motivations for cycling and its effects on his personal life. In May it was announced that he intended to return to racing in June at the Tour de Suisse to start his preparation for the COVID-19 pandemic-delayed 2020 Summer Olympics. He took the silver medal in the individual time trial event, for the second consecutive Olympic Games. Dumoulin finished his 2021 season early after he was hit by a motorist during training.

He went into the 2022 Giro d'Italia with hopes of finding the form he had ridden with in previous years. Unfortunately things did not go his way, as he did not have much luck in the first two weeks and ended up abandoning ahead of the final rest day. On stage 7 however, Dumoulin featured as part of the day's breakaway along with his teammate Koen Bouwman. He had attacked out of the peloton to join the second breakaway attempt of the day, which would stay away to fight for the stage win. While both Dumoulin and Bouwman were dropped from the group at different times they were each able to fight their way back to the front. As the end of the stage neared Dumoulin rode hard to set Bouwman up for the stage win, celebrating his teammate's victory as he crossed the line in Potenza. Several weeks later, Dumoulin posted a statement to his Instagram account, announcing that he would retire at the end of the 2022 season.

== Personal life ==
Dumoulin and his wife had their first child, a son, on 8 October 2024.

== Major results ==
2010
1st Overall Grand Prix du Portugal

1st Stage 3 (ITT)

1st Stage 8 (ITT) Giro Ciclistico d'Italia
7th Time trial, UCI Under-23 Road World Championships
2011
1st Overall Le Triptyque des Monts et Châteaux
3rd Overall Olympia's Tour
3rd Overall Thüringen Rundfahrt der U23
8th Time trial, UCI Under-23 Road World Championships
8th Liège–Bastogne–Liège Espoirs
2012
5th Overall Tour de Luxembourg
5th Rund um Köln
6th Overall Vuelta a Andalucía
10th Time trial, UCI Under-23 Road World Championships
10th Overall Vuelta a Burgos
2013
1st Mountains classification, Vuelta a Andalucía
National Road Championships

2nd Road race
3rd Time trial

2nd Overall Eneco Tour
5th Overall Tour of Belgium

1st Young rider classification

6th Overall Three Days of De Panne
6th Grand Prix de Wallonie
2014
1st Time trial, National Road Championships
1st Stage 2 (ITT) Critérium International
2nd Overall Tour of Belgium

1st Young rider classification

2nd Overall Tour of Alberta

1st Young rider classification
1st Prologue

2nd Grand Prix Cycliste de Québec
3rd Time trial, UCI Road World Championships
3rd Overall Eneco Tour

1st Points classification
1st Stage 3 (ITT)

5th Overall Tour de Suisse
6th Grand Prix Cycliste de Montréal
2015
1st Stage 6 (ITT) Tour of the Basque Country
3rd Overall Tour de Suisse

1st Stages 1 (ITT) & 9 (ITT)

4th Time trial, National Road Championships
4th Overall Tour Down Under
5th Time trial, UCI Road World Championships
6th Overall Vuelta a España

1st Stages 9 & 17 (ITT)
Held after Stages 5, 9–10 & 17–19
Held after Stages 9–14
Combativity award Stage 17, 21 & Overall

Tour de France

Held after Stage 2

2016
1st Time trial, National Road Championships
Tour de France

1st Stages 9 & 13 (ITT)
Combativity award Stage 9

Giro d'Italia

1st Stage 1 (ITT)
Held after Stages 1–2, 4–7
Held after Stage 1

2nd Time trial, Olympic Games
3rd Overall Tour of Britain
4th Overall Tour of Oman
5th Overall Tour de Romandie
9th Overall Eneco Tour
2017
UCI Road World Championships

1st Time trial
1st Team time trial

1st Time trial, National Road Championships
1st Overall Giro d'Italia

1st Stages 10 (ITT) & 14
Held after Stages 14–15

1st Overall BinckBank Tour
3rd UCI World Tour
3rd Overall Abu Dhabi Tour
4th Clásica de San Sebastián
5th Strade Bianche
6th Overall Tirreno–Adriatico
2018
UCI Road World Championships

2nd Time trial
2nd Team time trial
4th Road race

2nd Overall Giro d'Italia

1st Stage 1 (ITT)
Held & after Stage 1

2nd Overall Tour de France

1st Stage 20 (ITT)

4th Overall Deutschland Tour
10th UCI World Tour
2019
4th Overall Tirreno–Adriatico
6th Overall UAE Tour
2020
7th Overall Tour de France
7th Overall Critérium du Dauphiné
10th Time trial, UCI Road World Championships
2021
1st Time trial, National Road Championships
2nd Time trial, Olympic Games
9th Overall Benelux Tour
2022
2nd Time trial, National Road Championships
6th Volta Limburg Classic
Combativity award Stage 7 Giro d'Italia

=== General classification results timeline ===
Grand Tour general classification results
Grand Tour	2012	2013	2014	2015	2016	2017	2018	2019	2020	2021	2022
Giro d'Italia	—	—	—	—	DNF	1	2	DNF	—	—	DNF
Tour de France	—	41	33	DNF	DNF	—	2	—	7	—	—
Vuelta a España	DNF	—	—	6	—	—	—	—	DNF	—	—
Major stage race general classification results
Race	2012	2013	2014	2015	2016	2017	2018	2019	2020	2021	2022
Paris–Nice	—	—	—	DNF	12	—	—	—	—	—	—
Tirreno–Adriatico	—	34	102	—	—	6	DNF	4	—	—	—
Volta a Catalunya	—	—	—	—	DNF	—	—	—	NH	—	DNF
Tour of the Basque Country	—	—	40	29	—	—	—	—	NH	—	—
Tour de Romandie	—	68	—	—	5	—	—	—	NH	—	—
Critérium du Dauphiné	—	—	—	—	—	—	—	DNF	7	—	—
Tour de Suisse	—	58	5	3	—	DNF	—	—	NH	41	—

=== Classics results timeline ===
Monument	2012	2013	2014	2015	2016	2017	2018	2019	2020	2021	2022
Milan–San Remo	—	126	—	25	—	69	31	11	—	—	—
Tour of Flanders	DNF	—	—	—	—	—	—	—	—	—	—
Paris–Roubaix	Did not contest during his career										
Liège–Bastogne–Liège	DNF	121	65	25	—	22	15	50	12	—	—
Giro di Lombardia	DNF	18	43	DNF	DNF	—	—	—	—	—	—
Classic	2012	2013	2014	2015	2016	2017	2018	2019	2020	2021	2022
Strade Bianche	17	—	12	—	—	5	21	—	—	—	—
Amstel Gold Race	46	62	20	26	91	—	—	—	—	—	30
La Flèche Wallonne	—	—	21	—	—	—	—	—	DNF	—	—
Clásica de San Sebastián	—	—	—	—	—	4	—	—	NH	—	—
Grand Prix Cycliste de Québec	—	—	2	—	—	49	—	—	Not held		—
Grand Prix Cycliste de Montréal	—	—	6	—	—	17	—	—	Not held		—

=== Major championships results timeline ===
Event		2012	2013	2014	2015	2016	2017	2018	2019	2020	2021	2022
Olympic Games	Time trial	—	Not held			2	Not held				2	NH
Olympic Games	Road race	—	Not held			DNF	Not held				44	NH
World Championships	Time trial	—	—	3	5	11	1	2	—	10	—	—
World Championships	Team time trial	—	14	8	5	7	1	2	Race did not exist			
World Championships	Road race	—	DNF	22	11	DNF	25	4	—	14	—	—
National Championships	Time trial	7	3	1	4	1	1	—	—	NH	1	2
National Championships	Road race	7	2	36	—	52	47	29	—	—	DNF	38

Legend
—	Did not compete
DNF	Did not finish
DSQ	Disqualified
IP	In progress
NH	Not held

Awards and achievements
Preceded by Max Verstappen	Dutch Sportsman of the year 2017	Succeeded by Kjeld Nuis
