= Élodie La Villette =

French painter

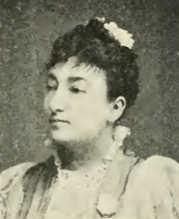
- Born: Elodie Jacquier; 12 April 1848; Strasbourg, France
- Died: 1917 (aged 68–69); Saint-Pierre-Quiberon, France
- Known for: painting

Élodie La Villette, born Elodie Jacquier (April 12, 1848 Strasbourg (Bas-Rhin) – 1917 Saint-Pierre-Quiberon), was a French painter. Élodie and her sister Caroline were among the few women to have artistic careers during an era when many opportunities were denied to women.

== Life ==
Elodie (Ella) La Villette was born in 1848 to an army doctor and his wife. Her younger sister, Caroline, was born four years later.

During the 1860s, the two sisters, Ella and Caroline Jacquier, took drawing classes with the painter Ernest Coroller at the Lycée Dupuy-de-Lôme. This influenced both their careers, since they both became painters, known under the respective names of Elodie La Villette and Caroline Espinet. She married in 1860, and her sister followed suit in 1868. They painted together. This was not a mere hobby, as they exhibited their work.

She had a painting accepted by the Salon in 1870 and was awarded a third-class medal in 1875. The following year, her painting, "La grève de Lohic et de l'île de la Souris près de Lorient," was bought by the Musée d'Orsay. Her painting won a bronze medal at the Universal Exhibition of 1889. La Villette exhibited her work at the Palace of Fine Arts and The Woman's Building at the 1893 World's Columbian Exposition in Chicago, Illinois.

Élodie La Villette, who received the advice of Jean-Baptiste Corot in 1874, carries off "marine art" sensitive to light effects which are reminiscent of both Courbet's realism and the virtuosity of Boudin". A review of a painting shown in 1897 in read:

The "Seaweeds," of Madame Elodie La Villette, belong to Brittany, to the coast of Port-Ivy-Quiberon. On that savage shore, at low tide, the sea uncovers rocks covered with red seaweed. They push far out into the waters, seeming to protect the Breton shore, itself already so austere, against strange vessels. In the distance, a ray of sunlight casts a silver streak upon the tranquil water. This is an effect of light that Madame Elodie La Villette knows how to treat with surety.

== Exhibitions ==
- In 1991, she was the artist of honor of the fair organized by the Lorient Society of Fine Arts, and had a retrospective tribute in 2007.
- In 2014, the Museum of Fine Arts Morlaix devoted its summer exhibition to the two sisters, Elodie La Villette and Caroline Espinet.

== Works ==
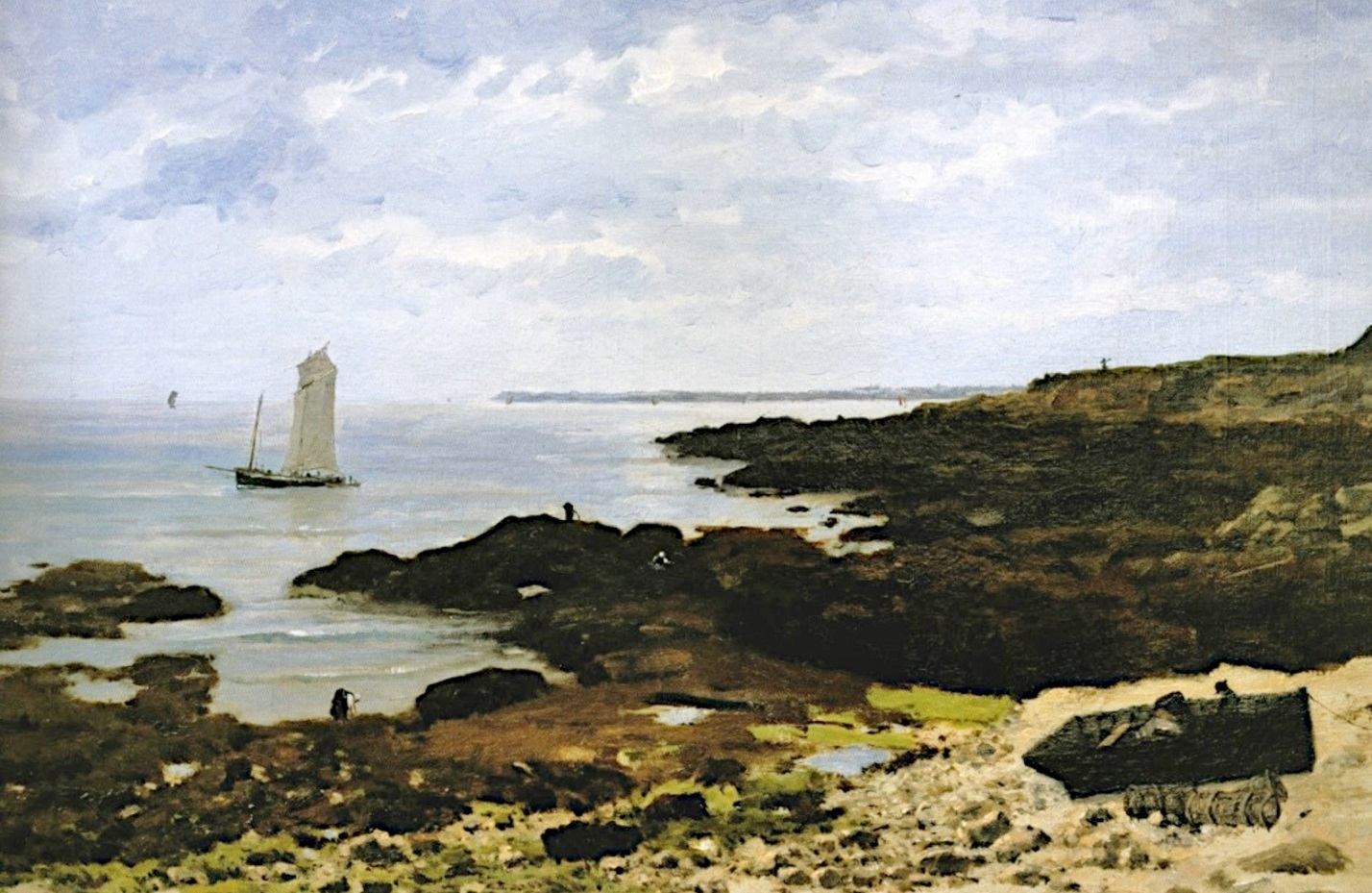
Larmor-Plage (1879)

- Marine, Musée d'art moderne et contemporain de Strasbourg
- La falaise d'Hyport, Musée des beaux-arts de Lille
- Marine, temps gris, Musée du Vieux-Château (Laval)
- Marée montante à Larmor, dessin, Département des Arts graphiques du Louvre
- Vue du quai Fleurquin à Douai, Musée de la Chartreuse de Douai
- Chemin de Bas-fort-Blanc, Musée de Morlaix
- La grève de Lohic et de l'île de la Souris près de Lorient, Musée d'Orsay
- Bateau échoué sur une plage de Larmor (1877)
- Village de Larmor (1878)
- Larmor-Plage (1879)
- Ramassage du goémon sur le rivage
- Marée basse, Dieppe (1885)
- Marée basse à Portivy

== Bibliography ==
- François Lotz, "Louise Madeleine Élodie La Villette", in Nouveau dictionnaire de biographie alsacienne, vol. 23, p. 2257
- Marie-Madeleine Martinie (2008), Elodie La Villette, Caroline Espinet: deux soeurs peintres, Hengoun, ISBN 978-2-916976-02-0
