= Paul Dumoulin =

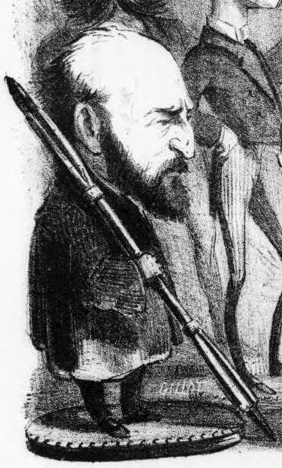
Caricature of Dumoulin by Alfred Grévin (1858)

Antoine Paul Gustave Dumoulin (18 September 1827, Paris – 5 July 1859, Paris) was a French painter and caricaturist.

== Biography ==
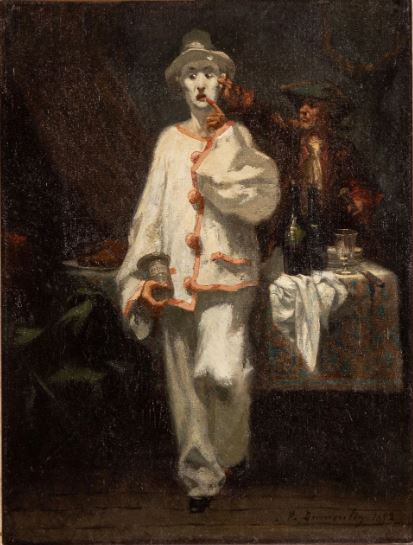
The Final Touch

He was the son of Alexandre-Hippolyte Dumoulin, an accountant, and his wife, Marie-Virginie née Taisand.

As a student of Hippolyte Lazerges, he displayed his early paintings at the Salon. Denied a place there in 1846, he benefitted from the absence of a selection jury in 1848, which was suspended due to the Revolution.

He then presented three works at that Salon: Still-life, Night Effect and Souvenir of Italy. In 1850–1851, he exhibited A Market and a Portrait of M. P. D.... Shortly before his death, he exhibited a tableau called A Suburb of Lyon, During the Flood of 1856.

He was equally, if not better known as a caricaturist; providing numerous illustrations for Le Gaulois, a weekly satirical journal. He designed their logo in 1858. His fellow staff members included Étienne Carjat, Paul Hadol and Alfred Grévin. One of his caricatures, of the sculptor Jean-Pierre Dantan, includes a caricature of himself, as a statuette.

During that same time, he also worked for the photographer Pierre Petit who, together with Antoine Trinquart (1814–1871), had recently opened a studio called "La Photographie des Deux Mondes".

Overwhelmed by serious financial and family problems, he decided to end his life. To do so, he bought some coal and asphyxiated himself, at home, with smoke from his stove. He could not be revived and died the next morning. Two days later, he was buried at Montmartre Cemetery.

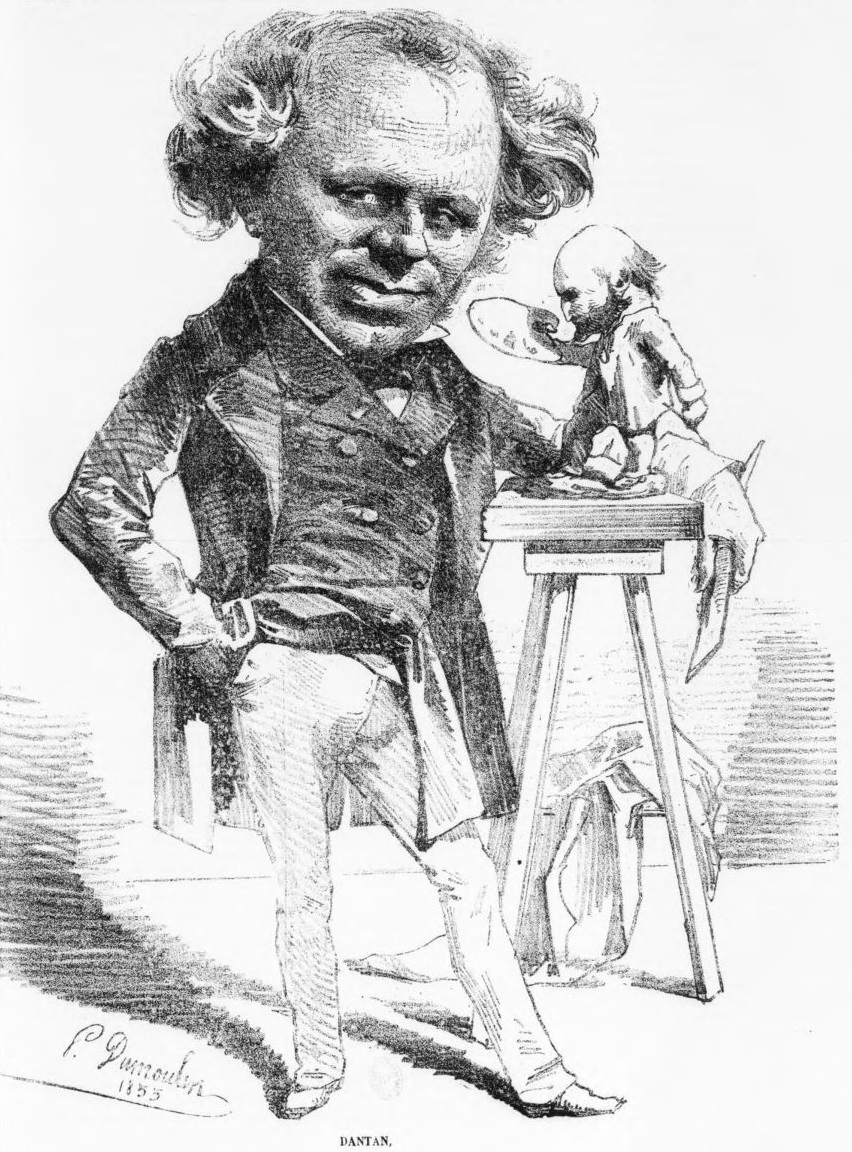
Caricature of Jean-Pierre Dantan, with a self-portrait
