= 2017 UCI Road World Championships =

Cycling world championships

- Location within Vestland Location within Norway
- Venue: Bergen, Norway
- Date: 17–24 September 2017
- Coordinates: 60°23′22″N 5°19′48″E
- Events: 12

The 2017 UCI Road World Championships were held in 2017 in Bergen, Norway. It was the 90th UCI Road World Championships and the second to be held in Norway, after the 1993 world championships in Oslo. Chantal Blaak of the Netherlands won the women's road race and Peter Sagan of Slovakia won the men's road race. Sagan became the first man to win three successive world road race championships.

== Bidding process ==
It was announced on 25 September 2014 following a two-day meeting held in conjunction with the 2014 UCI Road World Championships in Ponferrada, Spain, that Bergen was elected to host the Championships in 2017. The city was chosen over Innsbruck (Austria), Melbourne (Australia) and Bogotá (Colombia).

Bergen sent in their application by 1 January 2014. By that time they had put eighteen months of planning into the event. The total budget for the event is said to be 156 million Norwegian kroner. Of this, 58 million kroner are earmarked to be paid to the UCI as an organising fee. The Norwegian federation president Harald Tiedemann Hansen ruled out paying more than that. Norway had unsuccessfully bid for the 2016 World Championships.

== Schedule ==
All times are in CEST (UTC+2).

Date	Timings		Event	Distance	
Team time trial events
17 September	12:05	13:55	Women's teams	42.5 km (26.4 mi)	
17 September	15:35	17:25	Men's teams	42.5 km (26.4 mi)	
Individual time trial events
18 September	10:35	11:50	Junior women	16.1 km (10.0 mi)	
18 September	13:05	17:35	Under-23 men	37.2 km (23.1 mi)	
19 September	11:35	13:30	Junior men	21.1 km (13.1 mi)	
19 September	15:55	17:15	Elite women	21.1 km (13.1 mi)	
20 September	13:05	17:45	Elite men	31.0 km (19.3 mi)	
Road race events					Laps
22 September	10:05	12:15	Junior women	76.4 km (47.5 mi)	4
22 September	13:15	17:35	Under-23 men	191.0 km (118.7 mi)	10
23 September	09:30	12:45	Junior men	133.8 km (83.1 mi)	4
23 September	13:15	17:15	Elite women	152.8 km (94.9 mi)	8
24 September	10:05	16:50	Elite men	267.5 km (166.2 mi)	11

== Events summary ==
=== Elite events ===
Event	Gold		Silver		Bronze	
Men's Events
Men's road race	Peter Sagan (SVK)	6h 28' 11"	Alexander Kristoff (NOR)	+ 0"	Michael Matthews (AUS)	+ 0"
Men's time trial	Tom Dumoulin (NED)	44' 41.00"	Primož Roglič (SLO)	+ 57.79"	Chris Froome (GBR)	+ 1' 21.25"
Men's team time trial	(Germany) Team Sunweb	47' 50.42"	(United States) BMC Racing Team	+ 8.29"	(United Kingdom) Team Sky	+ 22.35"
Men's team time trial	Tom Dumoulin (NED); Lennard Kämna (GER); Wilco Kelderman (NED); Søren Kragh Andersen (DEN); Michael Matthews (AUS); Sam Oomen (NED)	47' 50.42"	Rohan Dennis (AUS); Silvan Dillier (SUI); Stefan Küng (SUI); Daniel Oss (ITA); Miles Scotson (AUS); Tejay van Garderen (USA)	+ 8.29"	Owain Doull (GBR); Chris Froome (GBR); Vasil Kiryienka (BLR); Michał Kwiatkowski (POL); Gianni Moscon (ITA); Geraint Thomas (GBR)	+ 22.35"
Women's Events
Women's road race	Chantal Blaak (NED)	4h 06' 30"	Katrin Garfoot (AUS)	+ 28"	Amalie Dideriksen (DEN)	+ 28"
Women's time trial	Annemiek van Vleuten (NED)	28' 50.35"	Anna van der Breggen (NED)	+ 12.16"	Katrin Garfoot (AUS)	+ 18.93"
Women's team time trial	(Netherlands) Team Sunweb	55' 41.63"	(Netherlands) Boels–Dolmans	+ 12.43"	(Germany) Cervélo–Bigla Pro Cycling	+ 28.03"
Women's team time trial	Lucinda Brand (NED); Leah Kirchmann (CAN); Floortje Mackaij (NED); Coryn Rivera (USA); Sabrina Stultiens (NED); Ellen van Dijk (NED)	55' 41.63"	Chantal Blaak (NED); Karol-Ann Canuel (CAN); Megan Guarnier (USA); Christine Majerus (LUX); Amy Pieters (NED); Anna van der Breggen (NED)	+ 12.43"	Stephanie Gaumnitz (GER); Lisa Klein (GER); Clara Koppenburg (GER); Lotta Lepistö (FIN); Cecilie Uttrup Ludwig (DEN); Ashleigh Moolman (RSA)	+ 28.03"

=== Under-23 events ===
Event	Gold		Silver		Bronze	
Men's Under-23 Events
Men's under-23 road race	Benoît Cosnefroy (FRA)	4h 48' 23"	Lennard Kämna (GER)	+ 0"	Michael Carbel (DEN)	+ 3"
Men's under-23 time trial	Mikkel Bjerg (DEN)	47' 06.48"	Brandon McNulty (USA)	+ 1' 05.92"	Corentin Ermenault (FRA)	+ 1' 16.65"

=== Junior events ===
Event	Gold		Silver		Bronze	
Men's Juniors Events
Men's junior road race	Julius Johansen (DEN)	3h 10' 48"	Luca Rastelli (ITA)	+ 51"	Michele Gazzoli (ITA)	+ 51"
Men's junior time trial	Tom Pidcock (GBR)	28' 02.15"	Antonio Puppio (ITA)	+ 11.92"	Filip Maciejuk (POL)	+ 13.29"
Women's Juniors Events
Women's junior road race	Elena Pirrone (ITA)	2h 06' 17"	Emma Jørgensen (DEN)	+ 12"	Letizia Paternoster (ITA)	+ 12"
Women's junior time trial	Elena Pirrone (ITA)	23' 19.72"	Alessia Vigilia (ITA)	+ 6.38"	Madeleine Fasnacht (AUS)	+ 42.32"

== Medal table ==
Place	Nation	1st place, gold medalist(s)	2nd place, silver medalist(s)	3rd place, bronze medalist(s)	Total
1	Netherlands	4	2	0	6
2	Italy	2	3	2	7
3	Denmark	2	1	2	5
4	Germany	1	1	1	3
5	Great Britain	1	0	2	3
6	France	1	0	1	2
7	Slovakia	1	0	0	1
8	United States	0	2	0	2
9	Australia	0	1	3	4
10	Norway	0	1	0	1
10	Slovenia	0	1	0	1
12	Poland	0	0	1	1
Total		12	12	12	36
