= List of wins by RusVelo and its successors =

This is a comprehensive list of victories of the Gazprom–RusVelo cycling team. The races are categorized according to the UCI Continental Circuits rules.

== 2012 RusVelo ==
Team Pursuit World Cup Beijing
Team Pursuit World Cup Astana
Stage 2 Vuelta a Murcia, Alexander Serov
Stage 5 Grand Prix of Sochi, Leonid Krasnov
Stage 1 Grand Prix of Adygeya, Sergey Firsanov
Stage 3 Grand Prix of Adygeya, Alexander Mironov
Stage 5 Grand Prix of Adygeya, Viktor Manakov
Overall Vuelta a la Comunidad de Madrid, Sergey Firsanov

Stage 2, Sergey Firsanov

Stage 8 Tour of Qinghai Lake, Artur Ershov
Stage 3 Tour of China II, Leonid Krasnov
Stage 1 Tour of Hainan, Leonid Krasnov

== 2013 RusVelo ==
Stage 1 (ITT) Grand Prix of Adygeya, Ilnur Zakarin
Memorial Oleg Dyachenko, Alexander Rybakov
Grand Prix of Moscow, Ivan Kovalev
Stage 3 Five Rings of Moscow, Sergey Klimov
Stage 1a Tour of Estonia, Leonid Krasnov
Russia Time Trial Championships, Ilnur Zakarin
Stage 1 Volta a Portugal, Alexander Serov
Stage 1 Vuelta Ciclista a Costa Rica, Evgeny Kovalev
Stage 5 Vuelta Ciclista a Costa Rica, Alexander Serov

== 2014 RusVelo ==
Overall Grand Prix of Sochi, Ilnur Zakarin

Stage 1, Sergey Lagutin
Stage 2, Roman Maikin

Overall Grand Prix of Adygeya, Ilnur Zakarin

Stage 1 (ITT), Ilnur Zakarin
Stages 2 & 5, Igor Boev

Mayor Cup, Sergey Lagutin
Memorial Oleg Dyachenko, Andrey Solomennikov
Overall Five Rings of Moscow, Andrey Solomennikov

Stages 2 & 4, Igor Boev
Stage 3, Sergey Lagutin

Overall Tour d'Azerbaïdjan, Ilnur Zakarin
Overall Grand Prix Udmurtskaya Pravda, Artur Ershov

Stage 1 (ITT), Timofey Kritsky
Stage 4, Artur Ershov

Stage 7 Tour of Qinghai Lake, Timofey Kritsky
Stage 2 Baltic Chain Tour, Ivan Balykin
Overall Tour of Kavkaz, Sergey Firsanov

Stage 2, Igor Boev
Stage 4, Sergey Firsanov

== 2015 RusVelo ==
Grand Prix of Sochi Mayor, Sergey Firsanov
Overall Grand Prix of Sochi, Alexander Foliforov

Stage 4 (ITT), Alexander Foliforov

Krasnodar–Anapa, Andrey Solomennikov
Stage 3 Tour of Kuban, Roman Maikin
Maykop–Ulyap–Maykop, Ivan Balykin
Overall Grand Prix of Adygeya, Sergey Firsanov

Stage 2, Sergey Firsanov

Stage 5 Tour d'Azerbaïdjan, Sergey Firsanov
Stage 1 (ITT) Tour of Slovenia, Artem Ovechkin
Russia Time Trial Championships, Artem Ovechkin
Russia U23 Road Race Championships, Artem Nych
Stage 4 Tour of Qinghai Lake, Ivan Savitskiy

== 2016 Gazprom–RusVelo ==
Overall Settimana Internazionale di Coppi e Bartali, Sergey Firsanov

Stage 1b (TTT)
Stage 2, Sergey Firsanov

Giro dell'Appennino, Sergey Firsanov
Stage 15 (ITT) Giro d'Italia, Alexander Foliforov
Stage 2 Tour of Estonia, Roman Maikin
Stage 2 Tour du Limousin, Roman Maikin

== 2017 Gazprom–RusVelo ==
Stage 4 Okolo Slovenska, Ivan Savitskiy
Russia Road Race Championships, Alexander Porsev

== 2018 Gazprom–RusVelo ==
Stage 2 Toscana-Terra di Ciclismo, Aleksandr Vlasov
Overall Giro Ciclistico d'Italia, Aleksandr Vlasov

== 2019 Gazprom–RusVelo ==
Stage 6 Tour of Austria, Aleksandr Vlasov
Russia Road Race Championships, Aleksandr Vlasov

== 2020 Gazprom–RusVelo ==
No recorded victories

== 2021 Gazprom–RusVelo ==
Russia Road Race Championships, Artem Nych
Stage 3 Tour de Limousin, Simone Velasco
Stage 4 Okolo Jižních Čech, Damiano Cima

== 2022 Gazprom–RusVelo ==
Stage 1 Tour of Antalya, Matteo Malucelli
Stage 6 UAE Tour, Mathias Vacek

== Supplementary statistics ==
Grand Tours by highest finishing position
| Race | 2012 | 2013 | 2014 | 2015 | 2016 | 2017 | 2018 | 2019 | 2020 | 2021 |
| Giro d'Italia | — | — | — | — | 30 | 40 | — | — | — | — |
| Tour de France | — | — | — | — | — | — | — | — | — | — |
| Vuelta a España | — | — | — | — | — | — | — | — | — | — |
Major week-long stage races by highest finishing position
| Race | 2012 | 2013 | 2014 | 2015 | 2016 | 2017 | 2018 | 2019 | 2020 | 2021 |
| Tour Down Under | — | — | — | — | — | — | — | — | — | NH |
| Paris–Nice | — | — | — | — | — | — | — | — | — | — |
| Tirreno–Adriatico | — | — | — | — | — | — | 26 | 24 | 21 | 31 |
| Volta a Catalunya | — | — | — | — | — | — | — | — | NH | 71 |
| Tour of the Basque Country | — | — | — | — | — | — | — | — | NH | — |
| Giro del Trentino | – | 53 | 21 | 76 | 4 | 34 | 31 | 10 | NH | 53 |
| Tour de Romandie | — | — | — | — | — | — | — | — | NH | — |
| Critérium du Dauphiné | — | — | — | — | — | — | — | — | — | — |
| Tour de Suisse | — | — | — | — | — | — | — | — | NH | — |
| Tour de Pologne | — | — | 21 | — | 46 | 48 | 28 | 45 | 28 | 22 |
| BinckBank Tour | — | — | — | — | — | — | — | — | — | — |
Monument races by highest finishing position
| Race | 2012 | 2013 | 2014 | 2015 | 2016 | 2017 | 2018 | 2019 | 2020 | 2021 |
| Milan–San Remo | — | — | — | — | — | 75 | 60 | — | 36 | — |
| Tour of Flanders | — | — | — | — | — | — | — | — | — | — |
| Paris–Roubaix | — | — | — | — | — | — | — | — | NH | — |
| Liège–Bastogne–Liège | — | — | — | — | — | — | — | — | — | 53 |
| Giro di Lombardia | — | — | — | — | 56 | 80 | — | 41 | 47 | — |
Classics by highest finishing position
| Classic | 2012 | 2013 | 2014 | 2015 | 2016 | 2017 | 2018 | 2019 | 2020 | 2021 |
| Omloop Het Nieuwsblad | DNF | — | 43 | — | — | — | — | — | — | — |
| Kuurne–Brussels–Kuurne | — | NH | — | — | — | — | — | — | — | — |
| Strade Bianche | — | — | — | 52 | — | — | — | — | — | — |
| E3 Harelbeke | — | — | — | — | — | 67 | — | — | NH | — |
| Gent–Wevelgem | — | — | — | — | — | — | — | — | — | — |
| Amstel Gold Race | — | — | — | — | — | — | — | — | NH | 50 |
| La Flèche Wallonne | — | — | — | — | — | — | — | — | — | 47 |
| Clásica de San Sebastián | — | — | — | — | — | — | — | — | NH | — |
| Paris–Tours | — | — | — | — | — | — | — | 26 | 28 | — |
