= 2012 UCI Europe Tour =

Cycling competition

- Eighth edition of the UCI Europe Tour

Details
- Dates: 29 January 2012 – 21 October 2012
- Location: Europe
- Races: About 300+

Champions
- Individual champion: John Degenkolb (GER) (Argos–Shimano)
- Teams' champion: Saur–Sojasun
- Nations' champion: Italy

The 2012 UCI Europe Tour was the eighth season of the UCI Europe Tour. The 2012 season began on 29 January 2012 with the Grand Prix d'Ouverture La Marseillaise and ended on 21 October 2012 with the Chrono des Nations.

The points leader, based on the cumulative results of previous races, wears the UCI Europe Tour cycling jersey. Giovanni Visconti of Italy was the defending champion of the 2010–11 UCI Europe Tour. John Degenkolb of Germany was crowned the 2012 UCI Europe Tour.

Throughout the season, points are awarded to the top finishers of stages within stage races and the final general classification standings of each of the stages races and one-day events. The quality and complexity of a race also determine how many points are awarded to the top finishers, the higher the UCI rating of a race, the more points are awarded.

The UCI ratings from highest to lowest are as follows:

- Multi-day events: 2.HC, 2.1 and 2.2
- One-day events: 1.HC, 1.1 and 1.2

== Events ==
Date	Race name	Location	UCI Rating	Winner	Team
29 January	Grand Prix d'Ouverture La Marseillaise	France	1.1	Samuel Dumoulin (FRA)	Cofidis
1–5 February	Étoile de Bessèges	France	2.1	Jérôme Coppel (FRA)	Saur–Sojasun
4 February	Gran Premio della Costa Etruschi	Italy	1.1	Elia Viviani (ITA)	Liquigas–Cannondale
5 February	Trofeo Palma	Spain	1.1	Andrew Fenn (GBR)	Omega Pharma–Quick-Step
6 February	Trofeo Migjorn	Spain	1.1	Andrew Fenn (GBR)	Omega Pharma–Quick-Step
7 February	Trofeo Deià	Spain	1.1	Lars Petter Nordhaug (NOR)	Team Sky
9–12 February	Tour Méditerranéen	France	2.1	Jonathan Tiernan-Locke (GBR)	Endura Racing
11–12 February	Giro della Provincia di Reggio Calabria	Italy	2.1	Elia Viviani (ITA)	Liquigas–Cannondale
15–19 February	Volta ao Algarve	Portugal	2.1	Richie Porte (AUS)	Team Sky
18 February	Trofeo Laigueglia	Italy	1.1	Moreno Moser (ITA)	Liquigas–Cannondale
18–19 February	Tour du Haut Var	France	2.1	Jonathan Tiernan-Locke (GBR)	Endura Racing
19–23 February	Vuelta a Andalucía	Spain	2.1	Alejandro Valverde (ESP)	Movistar Team
25 February	Ster van Zwolle	Netherlands	1.2	Robin Chaigneau (NED)	Koga Cycling Team
25 February	Beverbeek Classic	Belgium	1.2	Tom Van Asbroeck (BEL)	Topsport Vlaanderen–Mercator
25 February	Omloop Het Nieuwsblad	Belgium	1.HC	Sep Vanmarcke (BEL)	Garmin–Barracuda
26 February	Kuurne–Brussels–Kuurne	Belgium	1.1	Mark Cavendish (GBR)	Team Sky
26 February	Les Boucles du Sud Ardèche	France	1.1	Rémi Pauriol (FRA)	FDJ–BigMat
26 February	GP di Lugano	Switzerland	1.1	Eros Capecchi (ITA)	Liquigas–Cannondale
26 February	Clásica de Almería	Spain	1.HC	Michael Matthews (AUS)	Rabobank
29 February	Le Samyn	Belgium	1.1	Arnaud Démare (FRA)	FDJ–BigMat
2–4 March	Driedaagse van West-Vlaanderen	Belgium	2.1	Julien Vermote (BEL)	Omega Pharma–Quick-Step
3 March	Strade Bianche	Italy	1.1	Fabian Cancellara (SUI)	RadioShack–Nissan
3 March	De Vlaamse Pijl	Belgium	1.2	Frédéric Amorison (BEL)	Landbouwkrediet–Euphony
3–4 March	Vuelta a Murcia	Spain	2.1	Nairo Quintana (COL)	Movistar Team
4 March	Grand Prix de la Ville de Lillers	France	1.2	Russell Downing (GBR)	Endura Racing
4 March	Trofeo Zsšdi	Italy	1.2	Patrick Facchini (ITA)	Casati–MI Impianti
9 March	Dwars door Drenthe	Netherlands	1.1	Theo Bos (NED)	Rabobank
10 March	Ronde van Drenthe	Netherlands	1.1	Bert-Jan Lindeman (NED)	Vacansoleil–DCM
11 March	Trofeo Franco Balestra	Italy	1.2	Patrick Facchini (ITA)	Casati–MI Impianti
11 March	Paris–Troyes	France	1.2	Jean-Marc Bideau (FRA)	Bretagne–Schuller
11 March	Rabobank Dorpenomloop Rucphen	Netherlands	1.2	Giorgio Brambilla (ITA)	Leopard–Trek Continental Team
11 March	Poreč Trophy	Croatia	1.2	Matej Mugerli (SLO)	Adria Mobil
11 March	Kattekoers	Belgium	1.2	Roy Jans (BEL)	An Post–Sean Kelly
11 March	Omloop van het Waasland	Belgium	1.2	Preben Van Hecke (BEL)	Topsport Vlaanderen–Mercator
14 March	Nokere Koerse	Belgium	1.1	Francesco Chicchi (ITA)	Omega Pharma–Quick-Step
15–18 March	Istrian Spring Trophy	Croatia	2.2	Markus Eibegger (AUT)	RC Arbö–Wels–Gourmetfein
16 March	Handzame Classic	Belgium	1.1	Francesco Chicchi (ITA)	Omega Pharma–Quick-Step
17 March	Classic Loire Atlantique	France	1.1	Florian Vachon (FRA)	Bretagne–Schuller
18 March	Cholet-Pays de Loire	France	1.1	Arnaud Démare (FRA)	FDJ–BigMat
18 March	La Roue Tourangelle	France	1.2	Vyacheslav Kuznetsov (RUS)	Itera–Katusha
18 March	GP San Giuseppe	Italy	1.2	Ilya Gorodnichev (RUS)	Hopplà-Vega-Truck Italia
19–25 March	Tour de Normandie	France	2.2	Jérôme Cousin (FRA)	Team Europcar
20–24 March	Settimana Coppi & Bartali	Italy	2.1	Jan Bárta (CZE)	Team NetApp
21 March	Dwars door Vlaanderen	Belgium	1.1	Niki Terpstra (NED)	Omega Pharma–Quick-Step
22–25 March	Volta ao Alentejo	Portugal	2.2	Alexey Kunshin (RUS)	Lokosphinx
24–25 March	Critérium International	France	2.HC	Cadel Evans (AUS)	BMC Racing Team
27–29 March	Three Days of De Panne	Belgium	2.HC	Sylvain Chavanel (FRA)	Omega Pharma–Quick-Step
30 March	Route Adélie de Vitré	France	1.1	Roberto Ferrari (ITA)	Androni Giocattoli–Venezuela
30 March–1 April	Le Triptyque des Monts et Châteaux	Belgium	2.2	Bob Jungels (LUX)	Leopard–Trek Continental Team
31 March	Volta Limburg Classic	Netherlands	1.1	Pavel Brutt (RUS)	Team Katusha
31 March	GP Miguel Induráin	Spain	1.HC	Daniel Moreno (ESP)	Team Katusha
1 April	Flèche d'Emeraude	France	1.1	Roberto Ferrari (ITA)	Androni Giocattoli–Venezuela
1 April	GP de la Ville de Nogent-sur-Oise	France	1.2	Igor Boev (RUS)	Itera–Katusha
1 April	Trofeo Piva	Italy	1.2U	Jay McCarthy (AUS)	Team Jayco–AIS
3–6 April	Circuit de la Sarthe	France	2.1	Luke Durbridge (AUS)	GreenEDGE
4 April	Scheldeprijs	Belgium	1.HC	Marcel Kittel (GER)	Argos–Shimano
4–8 April	GP of Sochi	Russia	2.2	Ivan Stević (SRB)	Salcano–Arnavutkoy
5 April	GP Pino Cerami	Belgium	1.1	Gaëtan Bille (BEL)	Lotto–Belisol
6–8 April	Circuit des Ardennes	France	2.2	Marek Rutkiewicz (POL)	CCC–Polkowice
7 April	Ronde Van Vlaanderen Beloften	Belgium	1.Ncup	Kenneth Vanbilsen (BEL)	Belgium (national team)
8 April	Klasika Primavera	Spain	1.1	Giovanni Visconti (ITA)	Movistar Team
9 April	Rund um Köln	Germany	1.1	Jan Bárta (CZE)	Team NetApp
9 April	Dwars door het Hageland	Belgium	1.2	Timothy Stevens (BEL)	Ovyta-Eijssen-Acrog
9 April	Giro del Belvedere	Italy	1.2U	Daniele Dall'Oste (ITA)	U.C. Trevigiani–Dynamon–Bottoli
10 April	Paris–Camembert	France	1.1	Pierre-Luc Périchon (FRA)	La Pomme Marseille
10 April	GP Palio del Recioto	Italy	1.2U	Francesco Bongiorno (ITA)	Hopplà-Vega-Truck Italia
11 April	Brabantse Pijl	Belgium	1.HC	Thomas Voeckler (FRA)	Team Europcar
11 April	La Côte Picarde	France	1.Ncup	Vegard Breen (NOR)	Norway (national team)
11–15 April	Tour du Loir-et-Cher	France	2.2	Andrey Solomennikov (RUS)	Itera–Katusha
12 April	GP de Denain	France	1.1	Juan José Haedo (ARG)	Team Saxo Bank
13–15 April	Vuelta a Castilla y León	Spain	2.1	Javier Moreno (ESP)	Movistar Team
14 April	Tour du Finistère	France	1.1	Julien Simon (FRA)	Saur–Sojasun
14 April	Trofeo Edil C	Italy	1.2	Kristian Sbaragli (ITA)	Hopplà-Vega-Truck Italia
14 April	Liège–Bastogne–Liège Espoirs	Belgium	1.2U	Michael Valgren (DEN)	Glud & Marstrand–LRØ
14 April	ZLM Tour	Netherlands	1.Ncup	Maxime Daniel (FRA)	France (national team)
15 April	Tro-Bro Léon	France	1.1	Ryan Roth (CAN)	SpiderTech–C10
15 April	Giro dell'Appennino	Italy	1.1	Fabio Felline (ITA)	Androni Giocattoli–Venezuela
15 April	Zellik–Galmaarden	Belgium	1.2	Kevin Thome (BEL)	Wallonie Bruxelles–Crédit Agricole
15 April	Grand Prix of Donetsk	Ukraine	1.2	Ilnur Zakarin (RUS)	Itera–Katusha
17–20 April	Giro del Trentino	Italy	2.HC	Domenico Pozzovivo (ITA)	Colnago–CSF Bardiani
17–21 April	Toscana-Terra di Ciclismo	Italy	2.Ncup	Fabio Aru (ITA)	Italy (national team)
18–22 April	GP of Adygeya	Russia	2.2	Ilnur Zakarin (RUS)	Itera–Katusha
21 April	Arno Wallaard Memorial	Netherlands	1.2	Dylan van Baarle (NED)	Rabobank Continental Team
21 April	Banja Luka-Beograd I	Bosnia and Herzegovina	1.2	Marko Kump (SLO)	Adria Mobil
22 April	Vuelta a La Rioja	Spain	1.1	Evgeny Shalunov (RUS)	Lokosphinx
22 April	Ronde van Noord-Holland	Netherlands	1.2	Gediminas Bagdonas (LTU)	An Post–Sean Kelly
22 April	Val d'Ille U Classic 35	France	1.2	Éric Berthou (FRA)	Bretagne–Schuller
22 April	Banja Luka-Beograd II	Serbia	1.2	Matej Mugerli (SLO)	Adria Mobil
22–29 April	Presidential Tour of Turkey	Turkey	2.HC	Alexsandr Dyachenko (KAZ) (Note: Bulgaria's Ivailo Gabrovski initially won the race, but tested positive for erythropoietin (EPO) during the event.)	Astana
25 April	Gran Premio della Liberazione	Italy	1.2U	Enrico Barbin (ITA)	U.C. Trevigiani–Dynamon–Bottoli
25 April–1 May	Tour de Bretagne	France	2.2	Reinardt Janse van Rensburg (RSA)	MTN–Qhubeka
26–30 April	Vuelta a Asturias	Spain	2.1	Beñat Intxausti (ESP)	Movistar Team
28 April	GP Industria & Artigianato di Larciano	Italy	1.1	Filippo Pozzato (ITA)	Farnese Vini–Selle Italia
29 April	Giro della Toscana	Italy	1.1	Alessandro Ballan (ITA)	BMC Racing Team
29 April	GP Industrie del Marmo	Italy	1.2	Thomas Fiumana (ITA)	Petroli Firenze
29 April	Rutland–Melton Classic	United Kingdom	1.2	Alexandre Blain (FRA)	Endura Racing
29 April	Paris–Mantes-en-Yvelines	France	1.2	Alex Meenhorst (NZL)	Differdange–Magic–SportFood.de
29 April	Himmerland Rundt	Denmark	1.2	André Steensen (DEN)	Glud & Marstrand–LRØ
1 May	Memoriał Andrzeja Trochanowskiego	Poland	1.2	Tomasz Smolen (POL)	Bank BGŻ
1 May	Trofeo Papà Cervi	Italy	1.2	Giorgio Bocchiola (ITA)	Team Colpack
1 May	Grote 1-MeiPrijs	Belgium	1.2	Christophe Prémont (BEL)	Wallonie Bruxelles–Crédit Agricole
1 May	Mayor Cup	Russia	1.2	Igor Boev (RUS)	Itera–Katusha
1 May	Rund um den Finanzplatz Eschborn–Frankfurt U23	Germany	1.2U	Sven Erik Bystrøm (NOR)	Team Øster Hus-Ridley
1 May	Rund um den Finanzplatz Eschborn–Frankfurt	Germany	1.HC	Moreno Moser (ITA)	Liquigas–Cannondale
2 May	Memorial Oleg Dyachenko	Russia	1.2	Alexander Rybakov (RUS)	Itera–Katusha
2–6 May	Giro del Friuli-Venezia Giulia	Italy	2.2	Diego Rosa (ITA)	Palazzago–Elledent–Rad Logistica
2–6 May	Carpathia Couriers Path	Poland	2.2U	Maurits Lammertink (NED)	Cycling Team Jo Piels
3 May	GP of Moscow	Russia	1.2	Vitaliy Popkov (UKR)	ISD–Lampre Continental
4 May	GP Dobrich I	Bulgaria	1.2	Martin Grashev (BUL)	CC Nessebar Shockblaze
4–5 May	Ronde van Overijssel	Netherlands	1.2	Reinardt Janse van Rensburg (RSA)	MTN–Qhubeka
4–6 May	Szlakiem Grodów Piastowskich	Poland	2.1	Marek Rutkiewicz (POL)	CCC–Polkowice
4–8 May	4 Jours de Dunkerque	France	2.HC	Jimmy Engoulvent (FRA)	Saur–Sojasun
5–6 May	Vuelta a la Comunidad de Madrid	Spain	2.1	Sergey Firsanov (RUS)	RusVelo
5–9 May	Five Rings of Moscow	Russia	2.2	Igor Boev (RUS)	Itera–Katusha
6 May	Circuit de Wallonie	Belgium	1.2	Reinardt Janse van Rensburg (RSA)	MTN–Qhubeka
6 May	Circuito del Porto	Italy	1.2	Paolo Simion (ITA)	Zalf Désirée Fior
6 May	GP Dobrich II	Bulgaria	1.2	Stefan Hristov (BUL)	Bulgaria (national team)
6 May	Omloop der Kempen	Netherlands	1.2	Niko Eeckhout (BEL)	An Post–Sean Kelly
10–12 May	Tour of Małopolska	Poland	2.2	Marek Rutkiewicz (POL)	CCC–Polkowice
10–13 May	Rhône-Alpes Isère Tour	France	2.2	Paul Poux (FRA)	Saur–Sojasun
11–13 May	Tour de Picardie	France	2.1	John Degenkolb (GER)	Argos–Shimano
12 May	Scandinavian Race	Sweden	1.2	Jonas Ahlstrand (SWE)	Team CykelCity
13 May	Rogaland GP	Norway	1.1	Antonio Piedra (ESP)	Caja Rural
14–19 May	Olympia's Tour	Netherlands	2.2	Dylan van Baarle (NED)	Rabobank Continental Team
16–20 May	Circuit de Lorraine	France	2.1	Nacer Bouhanni (FRA)	FDJ–BigMat
16–20 May	Tour of Norway	Norway	2.1	Edvald Boasson Hagen (NOR)	Team Sky
16–20 May	Flèche du Sud	Luxembourg	2.2	Bob Jungels (LUX)	Leopard-Trek Continental Team
16–20 May	International Tour of Hellas	Greece	2.2	Robert Vrečer (SLO)	Team Vorarlberg
17 May	Ronde van Limburg	Belgium	1.2	Kevin Claeys (BEL)	Landbouwkrediet–Euphony
17–20 May	Tour de Berlin	Germany	2.2U	Nikias Arndt (GER)	LKT Team Brandenburg
17–20 May	Ronde de l'Isard	France	2.2U	Pierre-Henri Lecuisinier (FRA)	Vendée U
19 May	Jūrmala GP	Latvia	1.1	Rafael Andriato (BRA)	Farnese Vini–Selle Italia
19 May	Grand Prix Criquielion	Belgium	1.2	Tom David (NZL)	T.Palm-Pôle Continental Wallon
20 May	Neuseen Classics	Germany	1.1	André Schulze (GER)	Team NetApp
20–27 May	An Post Rás	Ireland	2.2	Nicolas Baldo (FRA)	Atlas Personal–Jakroo
23–27 May	Bayern Rundfahrt	Germany	2.HC	Michael Rogers (AUS)	Team Sky
23–27 May	Tour of Belgium	Belgium	2.HC	Tony Martin (GER)	Omega Pharma–Quick-Step
24–27 May	Tour of Trakya	Turkey	2.2	Yuriy Metlushenko (UKR)	Konya–Torku Şekerspor
25 May	Tallinn–Tartu GP	Estonia	1.1	Saïd Haddou (FRA)	Team Europcar
26 May	GP de Plumelec-Morbihan	France	1.1	Julien Simon (FRA)	Saur–Sojasun
26 May	Tartu GP	Estonia	1.1	Rene Mandri (EST)	Endura Racing
26–28 May	Tour de Gironde	France	2.2	Nick van der Lijke (NED)	Rabobank Continental Team
27 May	Boucles de l'Aulne	France	1.1	Sébastien Hinault (FRA)	Ag2r–La Mondiale
27 May	Race Horizon Park	Ukraine	1.2	Vitaliy Popkov (UKR)	ISD–Lampre Continental
27 May	Paris–Roubaix Espoirs	France	1.2U	Bob Jungels (LUX)	Leopard–Trek Continental Team
27 May	Trofeo Città di San Vendemiano	Italy	1.2U	Enrico Barbin (ITA)	U.C. Trevigiani–Dynamon–Bottoli
30 May–3 June	Tour de Luxembourg	Luxembourg	2.HC	Jakob Fuglsang (DEN)	RadioShack–Nissan
2 June	Trofeo Melinda	Italy	1.1	Carlos Betancur (COL)	Acqua & Sapone
2 June	Trofeo Alcide Degasperi	Italy	1.2	Enrico Barbin (ITA)	U.C. Trevigiani–Dynamon–Bottoli
2–9 June	Romanian Cycling Tour	Romania	2.2	Matija Kvasina (CRO)	Tuşnad Cycling Team
3 June	Riga GP	Latvia	1.2	Andžs Flaksis (LAT)	Latvia (national team)
3 June	Grand Prix Südkärnten	Austria	1.2	Marko Kump (SLO)	Adria Mobil
3 June	Coppa della Pace	Italy	1.2	Ruslan Tleubayev (KAZ)	Continental Team Astana
3 June	Memorial Van Coningsloo	Belgium	1.2	Gediminas Bagdonas (LTU)	An Post–Sean Kelly
5–9 June	Tour de Slovaquie	Slovakia	2.2	Enrico Rossi (ITA)	Meridiana–Kamen
7 June	GP du canton d'Argovie	Switzerland	1.1	Sergey Lagutin (UZB)	Vacansoleil–DCM
7–10 June	Ronde de l'Oise	France	2.2	Jean-Luc Delpech (FRA)	Bretagne–Schuller
8–17 June	Giro Ciclistico d'Italia	Italy	2.2	Joe Dombrowski (USA)	United States (national team)
9 June	Ronde van Zeeland Seaports	Netherlands	1.1	Reinardt Janse van Rensburg (RSA)	MTN–Qhubeka
9–15 June	Thüringen Rundfahrt U23	Germany	2.2U	Rohan Dennis (AUS)	Team Jayco–AIS
10 June	ProRace Berlin	Germany	1.1	André Greipel (GER)	Lotto–Belisol
12–17 June	Tour de Serbie	Serbia	2.2	Stefan Schumacher (GER)	Christina Watches–Onfone
13–17 June	Ster ZLM Toer	Netherlands	2.1	Mark Cavendish (GBR)	Team Sky
14–17 June	Tour of Slovenia	Slovenia	2.1	Janez Brajkovič (SLO)	Astana
14–17 June	Route du Sud	France	2.1	Nairo Quintana (COL)	Movistar Team
14–17 June	Boucles de la Mayenne	France	2.2	Laurent Pichon (FRA)	Bretagne–Schuller
14–17 June	Tour des Pays de Savoie	France	2.2	Stéphane Rossetto (FRA)	CC Nogent-sur-Oise
15–17 June	Oberösterreichrundfahrt	Austria	2.2	Robert Vrečer (SLO)	Team Vorarlberg
17 June	Flèche Ardennaise	Belgium	1.2	Clément Lhotellerie (FRA)	Colba-Superano Ham
20 June	Halle–Ingooigem	Belgium	1.1	Nacer Bouhanni (FRA)	FDJ–BigMat
27 June	I.W.T. Jong Maar Moedig	Belgium	1.2	Tim Declercq (BEL)	Topsport Vlaanderen–Mercator
28 June–1 July	Czech Cycling Tour	Czech Republic	2.2	František Padour (CZE)	Whirlpool–Author
30 June	Omloop Het Nieuwsblad U23	Belgium	1.2	Sander Helven (BEL)	Ovyta-Eijssen-Acrog
1–8 July	Österreich Rundfahrt	Austria	2.HC	Jakob Fuglsang (DEN)	RadioShack–Nissan
4–8 July	Course de la Solidarité Olympique	Poland	2.1	Mariusz Witecki (POL)	Bank BGŻ
4–8 July	Sibiu Cycling Tour	Romania	2.2	Víctor de la Parte (ESP)	SP Tableware
8 July	La Ronde Pévèloise	France	1.2	Benoît Daeninck (FRA)	CC Nogent-sur-Oise
8 July	Giro del Medio Brenta	Italy	1.2	Matteo Busato (ITA)	Team Idea U23
11 July	GP Stad Geel	Belgium	1.2	Tom Van Asbroeck (BEL)	Topsport Vlaanderen–Mercator
12–15 July	GP Torres Vedras	Portugal	2.2	Ricardo Mestre (POR)	Carmim–Prio
14 July	GP Nobili Rubinetterie	Italy	1.1	Danilo Di Luca (ITA)	Acqua & Sapone
16–22 July	Giro della Valle d'Aosta	Italy	2.2	Fabio Aru (ITA)	Palazzago-Elledent-Rad Logistica
21 July	Miskolc GP	Hungary	1.2	Krisztián Lovassy (HUN)	Tușnad Cycling Team
21–25 July	Tour de Wallonie	Belgium	2.HC	Giacomo Nizzolo (ITA)	RadioShack–Nissan
22 July	Budapest GP	Hungary	1.2	Marko Kump (SLO)	Adria Mobil
22 July	GP Ville de Pérenchies	France	1.2	Rico Rogers (NZL)	Node 4–Giordana Racing
25 July	Prueba Villafranca de Ordizia	Spain	1.1	Gorka Izagirre (ESP)	Euskaltel–Euskadi
25–28 July	Dookoła Mazowsza	Poland	2.2	Mateusz Taciak (POL)	CCC–Polkowice
25–29 July	Tour Alsace	France	2.2	Jonathan Tiernan-Locke (GBR)	Endura Racing
28–30 July	Kreiz Breizh Elites	France	2.2	André Steensen (DEN)	Glud & Marstrand–LRØ
29 July	Polynormande	France	1.1	Tony Hurel (FRA)	Team Europcar
29 July	Trofeo Matteotti	Italy	1.1	Pierpaolo De Negri (ITA)	Farnese Vini–Selle Italia
31 July	Circuito de Getxo	Spain	1.1	Giovanni Visconti (ITA)	Movistar Team
1–2 August	Paris–Corrèze	France	2.1	Egoitz García (ESP)	Cofidis
1–5 August	Vuelta a Burgos	Spain	2.HC	Daniel Moreno (ESP)	Team Katusha
3–12 August	Tour de Guadeloupe	France	2.2	Ludovic Turpin (FRA)	USC Goyave
5 August	Trofeo Bastianelli	Italy	1.2	Luigi Miletta (ITA)	Gragnano S.C.
5 August	Antwerpse Havenpijl	Belgium	1.2	Joeri Stallaert (BEL)	Landbouwkrediet–Euphony
7–11 August	Tour de l'Ain	France	2.1	Andrew Talansky (USA)	Garmin–Sharp
7–11 August	Vuelta a León	Spain	2.2	José Belda (ESP)	GSport-Valencia Terra i Mar
9–12 August	Mi-Août Bretonne	France	2.2	David Veilleux (CAN)	Team Europcar
9–12 August	Tour of Szeklerland	Romania	2.2	Vitaliy Popkov (UKR)	ISD–Lampre Continental
10 August	European Road Championships (U23) – Time Trial	Netherlands	CC	Rasmus Quaade (DEN)	Denmark (national team)
11 August	GP Città di Camaiore	Italy	1.1	Esteban Chaves (COL)	Colombia–Coldeportes
11 August	Memoriał Henryka Łasaka	Poland	1.2	Sylwester Janiszewski (POL)	CCC–Polkowice
12 August	European Road Championships (U23) – Road Race	Netherlands	CC	Jan Tratnik (SLO)	Slovenia (national team)
12 August	Puchar Uzdrowisk Karpackich	Poland	1.2	Sylwester Janiszewski (POL)	CCC–Polkowice
12 August	GP di Poggiana	Italy	1.2U	Adam Phelan (AUS)	Australia (national team)
14–17 August	Tour du Limousin	France	2.HC	Yukiya Arashiro (JPN)	Team Europcar
15–26 August	Volta a Portugal	Portugal	2.1	David Blanco (ESP)	Efapel–Glassdrive
16 August	Coppa Bernocchi	Italy	1.1	Sacha Modolo (ITA)	Colnago–CSF Bardiani
16 August	GP Capodarco	Italy	1.2	Gianfranco Zilioli (ITA)	Team Colpack
17 August	Coppa Ugo Agostoni	Italy	1.1	Emanuele Sella (ITA)	Androni Giocattoli–Venezuela
17 August	Dutch Food Valley Classic	Netherlands	1.1	Theo Bos (NED)	Rabobank
18 August	Puchar Ministra Obrony Narodowej	Poland	1.2	Damian Walczak (POL)	BDC-Marcpol Team
18 August	Tre Valli Varesine	Italy	1.HC	David Veilleux (CAN)	Team Europcar
18 August	Grand Prix Kralovehradeckeho kraje	Czech Republic	1.2	Martin Hačecký (CZE)	ASC Dukla Praha
19 August	Châteauroux Classic	France	1.1	Rafael Andriato (BRA)	Farnese Vini–Selle Italia
21 August	GP Stad Zottegem	Belgium	1.1	Matthias Brändle (AUT)	Team NetApp
21 August	GP des Marbriers	France	1.2	Sergei Pomoshnikov (RUS)	Itera–Katusha
21–24 August	Tour du Poitou-Charentes	France	2.1	Luke Durbridge (AUS)	Orica–GreenEDGE
21–25 August	Baltic Chain Tour	Lithuania/Latvia/Estonia	2.2	Gediminas Bagdonas (LTU)	Lithuania (national team)
22 August	Druivenkoers Overijse	Belgium	1.1	Björn Leukemans (BEL)	Vacansoleil–DCM
22–26 August	Danmark Rundt	Denmark	2.HC	Lieuwe Westra (NED)	Vacansoleil–DCM
23 August	GP Industria e Commercio Artigianato Carnaghese	Italy	1.1	Diego Ulissi (ITA)	Lampre–ISD
25 August	Giro del Veneto	Italy	1.1	Oscar Gatto (ITA)	Farnese Vini–Selle Italia
26 August	Schaal Sels	Belgium	1.1	Niko Eeckhout (BEL)	An Post–Sean Kelly
26 August	Ronde van Midden-Nederland	Netherlands	1.2	Ivar Slik (NED)	Rabobank Continental Team
26 August	Ljubljana-Zagreb	Slovenia	1.2	Marko Kump (SLO)	Adria Mobil
26 August–1 September	Tour de l'Avenir	France	2.Ncup	Warren Barguil (FRA)	France (national team)
31 August–1 September	World Ports Classic	Belgium/Netherlands	2.1	Tom Boonen (BEL)	Omega Pharma–Quick-Step
2 September	GP Jef Scherens	Belgium	1.1	Steven Caethoven (BEL)	Accent.jobs–Willems Veranda's
2 September	Tour du Doubs	France	1.1	Jérôme Coppel (FRA)	Saur–Sojasun
2 September	Memorial Davide Fardelli	Italy	1.2	Rohan Dennis (AUS)	Team Jayco–AIS
2 September	Kernen Omloop Echt-Susteren	Netherlands	1.2	Daniel Hoelgaard (NOR)	Team Øster Hus–Ridley
3–7 September	Giro di Padania	Italy	2.1	Vincenzo Nibali (ITA)	Liquigas–Cannondale
5 September	Memorial Rik Van Steenbergen	Belgium	1.1	Theo Bos (NED)	Rabobank
6–9 September	Okolo Jiznich Cech	Czech Republic	2.2	Jiří Hochmann (CZE)	ASC Dukla Praha
8 September	Paris–Brussels	Belgium	1.HC	Tom Boonen (BEL)	Omega Pharma–Quick-Step
9 September	Chrono Champenois	France	1.2	Rohan Dennis (AUS)	Australia (national team)
9 September	GP de Fourmies	France	1.HC	Lars Bak (DEN)	Lotto–Belisol
9–15 September	Tour of Bulgaria	Bulgaria	2.2	Maxat Ayazbayev (KAZ)	Continental Team Astana
9–16 September	Tour of Britain	United Kingdom	2.1	Jonathan Tiernan-Locke (GBR)	Endura Racing
12 September	GP de Wallonie	Belgium	1.1	Julien Simon (FRA)	Saur–Sojasun
14 September	Kampioenschap van Vlaanderen	Belgium	1.1	Ronan van Zandbeek (NED)	Argos–Shimano
14 September	GP de la Somme	France	1.1	Evaldas Šiškevičius (LTU)	La Pomme Marseille
15 September	GP Impanis-Van Petegem	Belgium	1.1	André Greipel (GER)	Lotto–Belisol
15 September	Memorial Marco Pantani	Italy	1.1	Fabio Felline (ITA)	Androni Giocattoli–Venezuela
16 September	GP d'Isbergues	France	1.1	John Degenkolb (GER)	Argos–Shimano
16 September	GP Industria & Commercio di Prato	Italy	1.1	Emanuele Sella (ITA)	Androni Giocattoli–Venezuela
16 September	Trofeo Gianfranco Bianchin	Italy	1.2	Kristian Sbaragli (ITA)	Simaf Carrier
16 September	Tour Bohemia	Czech Republic	1.2	Maroš Kováč (SVK)	Dukla Trenčín–Trek
19 September	Omloop van het Houtland	Belgium	1.1	Marcel Kittel (GER)	Argos–Shimano
21 September	Tour of Vojvodina I	Serbia	1.2	Kristjan Fajt (SLO)	Adria Mobil
22 September	Tour of Vojvodina II	Serbia	1.2	Clemens Fankhauser (AUT)	Tirol Cycling Team
22 September	Kustpijl Knokke-Heist	Belgium	1.2	Kevin Claeys (BEL)	Landbouwkrediet–Euphony
22–23 September	Tour du Gévaudan Languedoc-Roussillon	France	2.2	Davide Rebellin (ITA)	Meridiana–Kamen
23 September	Gooikse Pijl	Belgium	1.2	Ken Hanson (USA)	Optum–Kelly Benefit Strategies
25 September	Ruota d'Oro	Italy	1.2	Mattia Cattaneo (ITA)	U.C. Trevigiani–Dynamon–Bottoli
26 September	Milano–Torino	Italy	1.HC	Alberto Contador (ESP)	Saxo Bank–Tinkoff Bank
27 September	Gran Piemonte	Italy	1.HC	Rigoberto Urán (COL)	Team Sky
27–30 September	Circuit Franco-Belge	Belgium	2.1	Jürgen Roelandts (BEL)	Lotto–Belisol
30 September	Duo Normand	France	1.1	Luke Durbridge (AUS); Svein Tuft (CAN)	Orica–GreenEDGE
2 October	Binche–Tournai–Binche	Belgium	1.1	Adam Blythe (GBR)	BMC Racing Team
3 October	Münsterland Giro	Germany	1.1	Marcel Kittel (GER)	Argos–Shimano
4 October	Coppa Sabatini	Italy	1.1	Fabio Duarte (COL)	Colombia–Coldeportes
4 October	Paris–Bourges	France	1.1	Florian Vachon (FRA)	Bretagne–Schuller
6 October	Piccolo Giro di Lombardia	Italy	1.2	Jan Polanc (SLO)	Radenska
6 October	Giro dell'Emilia	Italy	1.HC	Nairo Quintana (COL)	Movistar Team
7 October	GP Beghelli	Italy	1.1	Nicki Sørensen (DEN)	Saxo Bank–Tinkoff Bank
7 October	Paris–Tours Espoirs	France	1.2U	Taruia Krainer (FRA)	Vendée U
7 October	Paris–Tours	France	1.HC	Marco Marcato (ITA)	Vacansoleil–DCM
9 October	Nationale Sluitingsprijs	Belgium	1.1	Wim Stroetinga (NED)	Koga Cycling Team
14 October	Tour de Vendée	France	1.HC	Wesley Kreder (NED)	Vacansoleil–DCM
21 October	Chrono des Nations	France	1.1	Tony Martin (GER)	Omega Pharma–Quick-Step

== Final standings ==
There is a competition for the rider, team and country with the most points gained from winning or achieving a high place in the above races.

=== Individual classification ===
Rank	Name	Points
1	John Degenkolb (GER)	597
2	Marcel Kittel (GER)	511
3	Jonathan Tiernan-Locke (GBR)	478.2
4	Marko Kump (SLO)	465
5	Danilo Di Luca (ITA)	410.2
6	Julien Simon (FRA)	399
7	Samuel Dumoulin (FRA)	394
8	Domenico Pozzovivo (ITA)	387.8
9	Carlos Betancur (COL)	369
10	Reinardt Janse van Rensburg (RSA)	349

=== Team classification ===
Rank	Team	Points
1	Saur–Sojasun	1667
2	Argos–Shimano	1615
3	Acqua & Sapone	1495
4	Androni Giocattoli–Venezuela	1482
5	Itera–Katusha	1254
6	Endura Racing	1161.2
7	Cofidis	1149
8	Team Europcar	1105
9	Team NetApp	1102.55
10	Adria Mobil	1044

=== Nation classification ===
Rank	Nation	Points
1	Italy	3054
2	France	2734
3	Germany	2650.83
4	Slovenia	2013
5	Russia	1840.5
6	Belgium	1639
7	Netherlands	1383.34
8	Poland	1194.6
9	Spain	1026.2
10	Great Britain	922.65

=== Nation under-23 classification ===
Rank	Nation under-23	Points
1	Italy	1355
2	Netherlands	1213.21
3	France	883
4	Belgium	842
5	Russia	615
6	Germany	406.5
7	Slovenia	397
8	Latvia	359
9	Denmark	346
10	Luxembourg	293
