= 2012 Team Katusha season =

2012 Team Katusha season
Manager	Hans-Michael Holczer
One-day victories	5
Stage race overall victories	1
Stage race stage victories	21
Previous season • Next season

The 2012 season for Team Katusha began in January at the Tour Down Under. As a UCI ProTeam, they were automatically invited and obligated to send a squad to every event in the UCI World Tour.

The team experienced a managerial change, as Andrei Tchmil left the post at the end of the 2011 season, with the intent to take a higher role within European cycling. He was replaced by former Gerolsteiner boss Hans-Michael Holczer.

== 2012 roster ==
Ages as of 1 January 2012.

Rider	Date of birth
Maxim Belkov (RUS)	9 January 1985 (aged 26)
Pavel Brutt (RUS)	29 January 1982 (aged 29)
Giampaolo Caruso (ITA)	15 August 1980 (aged 31)
Xavier Florencio (ESP)	26 December 1979 (aged 32)
Óscar Freire (ESP)	15 February 1976 (aged 35)
Denis Galimzyanov (Note: Galimzyanov was suspended from the team on 16 April, after testing positive for EPO in an out-of-competition drugs test in March.) (RUS)	7 March 1987 (aged 24)
Vladimir Gusev (RUS)	4 July 1982 (aged 29)
Marco Haller (AUT)	1 April 1991 (aged 20)
Joan Horrach (ESP)	27 March 1974 (aged 37)
Petr Ignatenko (RUS)	27 September 1987 (aged 24)
Mikhail Ignatiev (RUS)	7 May 1985 (aged 26)
Vladimir Isaichev (RUS)	26 April 1986 (aged 25)
Alexandr Kolobnev (Note: Kolobnev joined the team on 28 March.) (RUS)	4 May 1981 (aged 30)
Alexander Kristoff (NOR)	5 July 1987 (aged 24)
Timofey Kritsky (RUS)	24 January 1987 (aged 24)
Aleksandr Kuschynski (BLR)	27 October 1979 (aged 32)

Rider	Date of birth
Vyacheslav Kuznetsov (Note: Kuznetsov joined the team on 1 August, as a stagiaire, from Itera-Katusha.) (RUS)	24 June 1989 (aged 22)
Alberto Losada (ESP)	28 February 1982 (aged 29)
Denis Menchov (RUS)	25 January 1978 (aged 33)
Daniel Moreno (ESP)	5 September 1981 (aged 30)
Luca Paolini (ITA)	17 January 1977 (aged 34)
Alexander Porsev (RUS)	21 February 1986 (aged 25)
Joaquim Rodríguez (ESP)	12 May 1979 (aged 32)
Rüdiger Selig (GER)	19 February 1989 (aged 22)
Gatis Smukulis (LAT)	15 April 1987 (aged 24)
Simon Špilak (SLO)	23 June 1986 (aged 25)
Yuri Trofimov (RUS)	26 January 1984 (aged 27)
Alexei Tsatevich (RUS)	5 July 1989 (aged 22)
Maxime Vantomme (BEL)	8 March 1986 (aged 25)
Ángel Vicioso (ESP)	13 April 1977 (aged 34)
Eduard Vorganov (RUS)	1 December 1982 (aged 29)
Anton Vorobev (Note: Vorobev joined the team on 1 August, as a stagiaire, from Itera-Katusha.) (RUS)	12 October 1990 (aged 21)
Ilnur Zakarin (Note: Zakarin joined the team on 1 August, as a stagiaire, from Itera-Katusha.) (RUS)	15 September 1989 (aged 22)

Riders who joined the team for the 2012 season

Rider	2011 team
Ángel Vicioso	Androni Giocattoli
Alexander Kristoff	BMC Racing Team
Maxim Belkov	Vacansoleil–DCM
Xavier Florencio	Geox–TMC
Timofey Kritsky	neo-pro (Itera–Katusha)
Alexei Tsatevich	neo-pro (Itera–Katusha)
Óscar Freire	Rabobank
Gatis Smukulis	HTC–Highroad
Rüdiger Selig	stagiaire (Leopard Trek)
Marco Haller	neo-pro (Adria Mobil)
Simon Špilak	Lampre–ISD
Denis Menchov	Geox–TMC

Riders who left the team during or after the 2011 season

Rider	2012 team
Stijn Vandenbergh	Omega Pharma–Quick-Step
Egor Silin	Astana
Filippo Pozzato	Farnese Vini–Selle Italia
Danilo Di Luca	Acqua & Sapone
Vladimir Karpets	Movistar Team
Leif Hoste	Accent.jobs–Willems Veranda's
Alexandre Pliuschin	Leopard Trek Continental
Arkimedes Arguelyes	RusVelo
Sergei Ivanov	Retired
Alexander Mironov	RusVelo
Artem Ovechkin	RusVelo
Nikolay Trusov	RusVelo

== Season victories ==
Date	Race	Competition	Rider	Country	Location
20 January	Tour Down Under, Stage 4	UCI World Tour	Óscar Freire (ESP)	Australia	Tanunda
22 February	Vuelta a Andalucía, Stage 3	UCI Europe Tour	Óscar Freire (ESP)	Spain	Las Gabias
23 February	Vuelta a Andalucía, Stage 4	UCI Europe Tour	Daniel Moreno (ESP)	Spain	La Guardia de Jaén
12 March	Tirreno–Adriatico, Stage 6	UCI World Tour	Joaquim Rodríguez (ESP)	Italy	Offida
29 March	Three Days of De Panne, Stage 3a	UCI Europe Tour	Alexander Kristoff (NOR)	Belgium	De Panne
29 March	Three Days of De Panne, Points classification	UCI Europe Tour	Alexander Kristoff (NOR)	Belgium	
31 March	Volta Limburg Classic	UCI Europe Tour	Pavel Brutt (RUS)	Netherlands	Eijsden
31 March	GP Miguel Indurain	UCI Europe Tour	Daniel Moreno (ESP)	Spain	Estella
3 April	Circuit de la Sarthe, Stage 1	UCI Europe Tour	Denis Galimzyanov (RUS)	France	Riaillé
5 April	Tour of the Basque Country, Stage 4	UCI World Tour	Joaquim Rodríguez (ESP)	Spain	Bera
6 April	Tour of the Basque Country, Stage 5	UCI World Tour	Joaquim Rodríguez (ESP)	Spain	Oñati
7 April	Tour of the Basque Country, Teams classification	UCI World Tour	(Note: The riders on the squad were Joaquim Rodríguez, Daniel Moreno, Simon Špilak, Giampaolo Caruso, Eduard Vorganov, Yuri Trofimov, Ángel Vicioso and Alberto Losada)	Spain	
18 April	La Flèche Wallonne	UCI World Tour	Joaquim Rodríguez (ESP)	Belgium	Huy
29 April	Presidential Cycling Tour of Turkey, Sprints classification	UCI Europe Tour	Maxim Belkov (RUS)	Turkey	
29 April	Tour de Romandie, Mountains classification	UCI World Tour	Petr Ignatenko (RUS)	Switzerland	
29 April	Tour de Romandie, Sprints classification	UCI World Tour	Petr Ignatenko (RUS)	Switzerland	
15 May	Giro d'Italia, Stage 10	UCI World Tour	Joaquim Rodríguez (ESP)	Italy	Assisi
19 May	Heistse Pijl	National event	Maxime Vantomme (BEL)	Belgium	Heist-op-den-Berg
23 May	Giro d'Italia, Stage 17	UCI World Tour	Joaquim Rodríguez (ESP)	Italy	Cortina d'Ampezzo
27 May	Giro d'Italia, Points classification	UCI World Tour	Joaquim Rodríguez (ESP)	Italy	
5 June	Critérium du Dauphiné, Stage 2	UCI World Tour	Daniel Moreno (ESP)	France	Saint-Félicien
10 June	Critérium du Dauphiné, Stage 7	UCI World Tour	Daniel Moreno (ESP)	France	Châtel
13 June	Tour de Suisse, Stage 5	UCI World Tour	Vladimir Isaichev (RUS)	Switzerland	Gansingen
1 August	Vuelta a Burgos, Stage 1	UCI Europe Tour	Daniel Moreno (ESP)	Spain	Ojo Guareña
2 August	Vuelta a Burgos, Stage 2	UCI Europe Tour	Daniel Moreno (ESP)	Spain	Burgos
5 August	Vuelta a Burgos, Overall	UCI Europe Tour	Daniel Moreno (ESP)	Spain	
5 August	Vuelta a Burgos, Points classification	UCI Europe Tour	Daniel Moreno (ESP)	Spain	
23 August	Vuelta a España, Stage 6	UCI World Tour	Joaquim Rodríguez (ESP)	Spain	Jaca
25 August	Danmark Rundt, Stage 4	UCI Europe Tour	Alexander Kristoff (NOR)	Denmark	Odense
26 August	Danmark Rundt, Points classification	UCI Europe Tour	Alexander Kristoff (NOR)	Denmark	
30 August	Vuelta a España, Stage 12	UCI World Tour	Joaquim Rodríguez (ESP)	Spain	Mirador de Ézaro
1 September	World Ports Classic, Young rider classification	UCI Europe Tour	Alexander Kristoff (NOR)	(Note: Race held in Belgium and the Netherlands.)	
1 September	Vuelta a España, Stage 14	UCI World Tour	Joaquim Rodríguez (ESP)	Spain	Puerto de Ancares
8 September	Vuelta a España, Stage 20	UCI World Tour	Denis Menchov (RUS)	Spain	Bola del Mundo
29 September	Giro di Lombardia	UCI World Tour	Joaquim Rodríguez (ESP)	Italy	Lecco
12 October	Tour of Beijing, Stage 4	UCI World Tour	Marco Haller (AUT)	China	Chang Ping
13 October	UCI World Tour	UCI World Tour	Joaquim Rodríguez (ESP)		
