= Maxim Pokidov =

Russian bicycle racer

Personal information
- Full name: Maxim Petrovich Pokidov
- Born: 11 July 1989 (age 37) Lipetsk, Russia

Cycling career
- Sport: Cycling
- Current team: Retired
- Discipline: Road
- Role: Rider

Professional teams
- 2010: Moscow
- 2012–2015: Itera–Katusha

Maxim Petrovich Pokidov (Russian: Макси́м Петро́вич Поки́дов; born 11 July 1989 in Lipetsk) is a Russian former professional cyclist.

== Major results ==
2006
1st Points race, UEC European Junior Track Championships
2011
3rd Time trial, National Under-23 Road Championships
2012
1st Stage 3 (TTT) Circuit des Ardennes
2013
1st Criterium, National Road Championships
1st Stage 2 Five Rings of Moscow
1st Stage 1 Tour Alsace
2nd Mayor Cup
3rd Grand Prix of Donetsk
4th Overall Grand Prix of Adygeya

1st Points classification

9th Grand Prix of Moscow
2014
1st Points classification Tour Alsace
4th Duo Normand (with Maxim Razumov)
5th Overall Baltic Chain Tour
7th Overall Okolo Jižních Čech
7th Central European Tour Szerencs–Ibrány
9th Overall Czech Cycling Tour
2015
1st Team time trial, National Road Championships (with Anton Samokhvalov, Kirill Yegorov and Dimitry Samokhvalov)
1st Stage 1 (TTT) Grand Prix of Sochi
3rd Overall Grand Prix of Adygeya

1st Stage 1 (TTT)

9th Overall Tour of Kuban

1st Prologue
