= 2013 Team Katusha season =

Cycling team season

2013 Team Katusha season
Manager	Vyacheslav Ekimov
One-day victories	7
Stage race overall victories	1
Stage race stage victories	20
Previous season • Next season

The 2013 season for Team Katusha began in January at the Tour de San Luis.

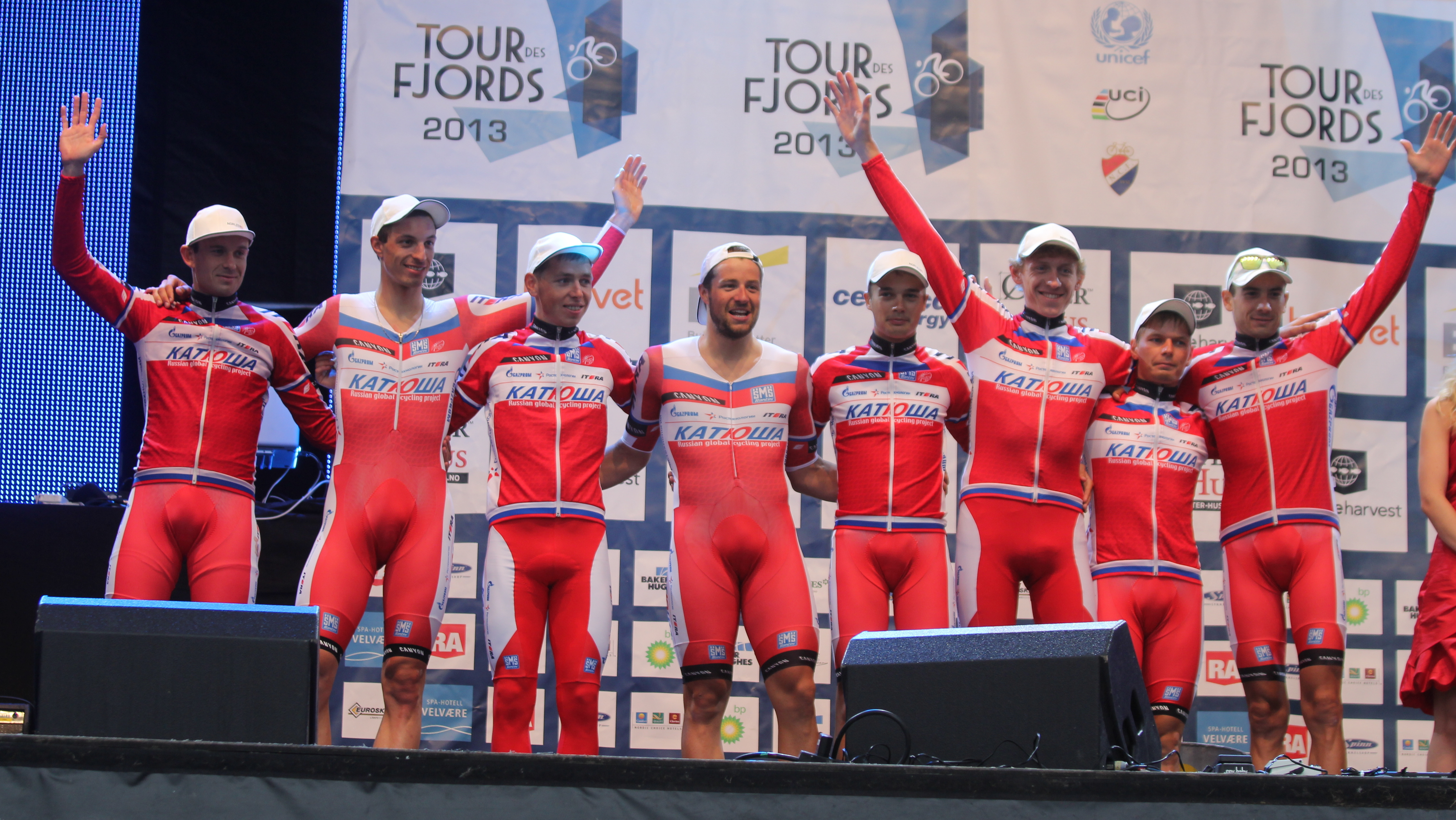
Katusha Team winner of Tour des Fjords 2013

After the 2012 season, Katusha lost their UCI World Tour license, despite having in their ranks the champion of the 2012 season (Joaquim Rodríguez) and finishing the 2012 UCI World Tour team rankings in second position. The team appealed that decision before the Court of Arbitration for Sport and it was announced on 15 February 2013 that the decision of the UCI was overturned and that Katusha would be part of the 2013 UCI World Tour.

== Team roster ==
As of 2 January 2013.

Rider	Date of birth
Mikhail Antonov (Note: Antonov joined the team on 1 August as a stagiaire, from Itera–Katusha.) (RUS)	4 January 1986 (aged 26)
Maxim Belkov (RUS)	9 January 1985 (aged 27)
Pavel Brutt (RUS)	29 January 1982 (aged 30)
Giampaolo Caruso (ITA)	15 August 1980 (aged 32)
Sergey Chernetskiy (RUS)	9 April 1990 (aged 22)
Xavier Florencio (ESP)	26 December 1979 (aged 33)
Vladimir Gusev (RUS)	4 July 1982 (aged 30)
Marco Haller (AUT)	1 April 1991 (aged 21)
Petr Ignatenko (RUS)	27 September 1987 (aged 25)
Mikhail Ignatiev (RUS)	7 May 1985 (aged 27)
Vladimir Isaichev (RUS)	26 April 1986 (aged 26)
Alexandr Kolobnev (RUS)	4 May 1981 (aged 31)
Dmitry Kozonchuk (RUS)	5 April 1984 (aged 28)
Alexander Kristoff (NOR)	5 July 1987 (aged 25)
Timofey Kritsky (RUS)	24 January 1987 (aged 25)
Aleksandr Kuschynski (BLR)	27 October 1979 (aged 33)
Vyacheslav Kuznetsov (RUS)	24 June 1989 (aged 23)

Rider	Date of birth
Alberto Losada (ESP)	28 February 1982 (aged 30)
Denis Menchov (Note: Menchov retired from professional cycling on 19 May.) (RUS)	25 January 1978 (aged 34)
Daniel Moreno (ESP)	5 September 1981 (aged 31)
Sergey Nikolaev (Note: Nikolaev joined the team on 1 August as a stagiaire, from Itera–Katusha.) (RUS)	5 February 1988 (aged 24)
Luca Paolini (ITA)	17 January 1977 (aged 35)
Alexander Porsev (RUS)	21 February 1986 (aged 26)
Maxim Razumov (Note: Razumov joined the team on 1 August as a stagiaire, from Itera–Katusha.) (RUS)	12 April 1990 (aged 22)
Joaquim Rodríguez (ESP)	12 May 1979 (aged 33)
Rüdiger Selig (GER)	19 February 1989 (aged 23)
Gatis Smukulis (LAT)	15 April 1987 (aged 25)
Simon Špilak (SLO)	23 June 1986 (aged 26)
Yuri Trofimov (RUS)	26 January 1984 (aged 28)
Alexey Tsatevich (RUS)	5 July 1989 (aged 23)
Ángel Vicioso (ESP)	13 April 1977 (aged 35)
Eduard Vorganov (RUS)	1 December 1982 (aged 30)
Anton Vorobyev (RUS)	12 October 1990 (aged 22)

Riders who joined the team for the 2013 season

Rider	2012 team
Sergey Chernetskiy	Itera-Katusha
Dmitry Kozonchuk	RusVelo
Vyacheslav Kuznetsov	Itera-Katusha
Anton Vorobyev	Itera-Katusha

Riders who left the team during or after the 2012 season

Rider	2013 team
Óscar Freire	retired
Denis Galimzyanov	fired (doping)
Joan Horrach	Madison-Genesis
Maxime Vantomme	Crelan–Euphony

== Season victories ==
Date	Race	Competition	Rider	Country	Location
14 February	Tour of Oman, Stage 4	UCI Asia Tour	Joaquim Rodríguez (ESP)	Oman	Jabal Al Akhdhar
23 February	Omloop Het Nieuwsblad	UCI Europe Tour	Luca Paolini (ITA)	Belgium	Ghent
27 February	Le Samyn	UCI Europe Tour	Alexey Tsatevich (RUS)	Belgium	Dour
10 March	Tirreno–Adriatico, Stage 5	UCI World Tour	Joaquim Rodríguez (ESP)	Italy	Chieti
10 March	Paris–Nice, Teams classification	UCI World Tour	(Note: The riders on the squad were Simon Špilak, Xavier Florencio, Alexander Kristoff, Alberto Losada, Denis Menchov, Gatis Smukulis, Yuri Trofimov and Eduard Vorganov)	France	
20 March	Settimana Internazionale di Coppi e Bartali, Stage 1b	UCI Europe Tour	Team time trial (Note: The riders on the squad were Maxim Belkov, Sergey Chernetskiy, Mikhail Ignatiev, Petr Ignatenko, Timofey Kritsky, Alexander Porsev, and Anton Vorobyev)	Italy	Gatteo Mare
28 March	Three Days of De Panne, Stage 3a	UCI Europe Tour	Alexander Kristoff (NOR)	Belgium	De Panne
28 March	Three Days of De Panne, Points classification	UCI Europe Tour	Alexander Kristoff (NOR)	Belgium	
28 March	Three Days of De Panne, Mountains classification	UCI Europe Tour	Marco Haller (AUT)	Belgium	
30 March	Volta Limburg Classic	UCI Europe Tour	Rüdiger Selig (GER)	Netherlands	Eijsden
30 March	GP Miguel Indurain	UCI Europe Tour	Simon Špilak (SLO)	Spain	Estella
17 April	La Flèche Wallonne	UCI World Tour	Daniel Moreno (ESP)	Belgium	Huy
27 April	Tour de Romandie, Stage 4	UCI World Tour	Simon Špilak (SLO)	Switzerland	Les Diablerets
28 April	Tour of Turkey, Sprints classification	UCI Europe Tour	Mikhail Ignatiev (RUS)	Turkey	
1 May	Eschborn-Frankfurt City Loop	UCI Europe Tour	Simon Špilak (SLO)	Germany	Frankfurt
6 May	Giro d'Italia, Stage 3	UCI World Tour	Luca Paolini (ITA)	Italy	Marina di Ascea
12 May	Giro d'Italia, Stage 9	UCI World Tour	Maxim Belkov (RUS)	Italy	Firenze
15 May	Glava Tour of Norway, Stage 1	UCI Europe Tour	Alexander Kristoff (NOR)	Norway	Sarpsborg
16 May	Glava Tour of Norway, Stage 2	UCI Europe Tour	Alexander Kristoff (NOR)	Norway	Skien
19 May	Glava Tour of Norway, Stage 5	UCI Europe Tour	Alexander Kristoff (NOR)	Norway	Hønefoss
26 May	Tour of Belgium, Mountains classification	UCI Europe Tour	Mikhail Ignatiev (RUS)	Belgium	
12 June	Tour de Suisse, Stage 5	UCI World Tour	Alexander Kristoff (NOR)	Switzerland	Leuggern
13 June	Tour de Luxembourg, Stage 1	UCI Europe Tour	Alexander Porsev (RUS)	Luxembourg	Hautcharage
7 July	Tour of Austria, Young rider classification	UCI Europe Tour	Sergey Chernetskiy (RUS)	Austria	
20 July	Tour de Wallonie, Stage 1	UCI Europe Tour	Alexandr Kolobnev (RUS)	Belgium	Eupen
16 August	Tour des Fjords, Stage 1	UCI Europe Tour	Sergey Chernetskiy (RUS)	Norway	Stavanger
17 August	Tour des Fjords, Stage 2	UCI Europe Tour	Alexander Kristoff (NOR)	Norway	Forsand
17 August	Tour des Fjords, Stage 3	UCI Europe Tour	Team time trial (Note: The riders on the squad were Maxim Belkov, Sergey Chernetskiy, Marco Haller, Alexander Kristoff, Timofey Kritsky, Sergey Nikolaev, Maksim Razumov, and Rüdiger Selig)	Norway	Stavanger
18 August	Tour des Fjords, Overall	UCI Europe Tour	Sergey Chernetskiy (RUS)	Norway	
18 August	Tour des Fjords, Points classification	UCI Europe Tour	Alexander Kristoff (NOR)	Norway	
18 August	Tour des Fjords, Young rider classification	UCI Europe Tour	Sergey Chernetskiy (RUS)	Norway	
18 August	Tour des Fjords, Teams classification	UCI Europe Tour		Norway	
27 August	Vuelta a España, Stage 4	UCI World Tour	Daniel Moreno (ESP)	Spain	Fisterra–Etapa Fin del Mundo
30 August	Tour du Poitou-Charentes, Teams classification	UCI Europe Tour	(Note: The riders on the squad were Maxim Belkov, Pavel Brutt, Mikhail Ignatiev, Petr Ignatenko, Timofey Kritsky, Simon Špilak, Yuri Trofimov and Eduard Vorganov)	France	
1 September	Vuelta a España, Stage 9	UCI World Tour	Daniel Moreno (ESP)	Spain	Valdepeñas de Jaén
7 September	Settimana Ciclistica Lombarda, Stage 3	UCI Europe Tour	Alexey Tsatevich (RUS)	Italy	Bergamo
13 September	Vuelta a España, Stage 19	UCI World Tour	Joaquim Rodríguez (ESP)	Spain	Oviedo–Alto Naranco
6 October	Giro di Lombardia	UCI World Tour	Joaquim Rodríguez (ESP)	Italy	Lecco
15 October	UCI World Tour, Overall classification	UCI World Tour	Joaquim Rodríguez (ESP)		
