= 2012 UCI Road World Championships – Men's team time trial =

Men's team time trial
2012 UCI Road World Championships

Race details
- Dates: 16 September 2012
- Stages: 1
- Distance: 53.2 km (33.06 mi)
- Winning time: 1h 03' 17.17"

Medalists
	Gold	(Belgium) Omega Pharma–Quick-Step
	Silver	(United States) BMC Racing Team
	Bronze	(Australia) Orica–GreenEDGE

The Men's team time trial of the 2012 UCI Road World Championships cycling event took place on 16 September 2012 in the province of Limburg, Netherlands.

It was the first such event for trade teams, and the first team time trial to be held as a world championship since 1994. The race was won by the Belgian squad Omega Pharma–Quick-Step by 3.23 seconds over the American BMC Racing Team, with Australian outfit Orica–GreenEDGE completing the podium, 47.06 seconds in arrears of Omega Pharma–Quick-Step.

== Final classification ==
Rank	Team	Riders	Time
1	Omega Pharma–Quick-Step	Tom Boonen (BEL); Sylvain Chavanel (FRA); Tony Martin (GER); Niki Terpstra (NED); Kristof Vandewalle (BEL); Peter Velits (SVK)	1h 03' 17.17"
2	BMC Racing Team	Alessandro Ballan (ITA); Philippe Gilbert (BEL); Taylor Phinney (USA); Marco Pinotti (ITA); Manuel Quinziato (ITA); Tejay van Garderen (USA)	+ 3.23"
3	Orica–GreenEDGE	Sam Bewley (NZL); Luke Durbridge (AUS); Sebastian Langeveld (NED); Cameron Meyer (AUS); Jens Mouris (NED); Svein Tuft (CAN)	+ 47.06"
4	Liquigas–Cannondale	Maciej Bodnar (POL); Tiziano Dall'Antonia (ITA); Kristijan Koren (SLO); Vincenzo Nibali (ITA); Maciej Paterski (POL); Peter Sagan (SVK)	+ 1' 04.73"
5	Rabobank	Lars Boom (NED); Stef Clement (NED); Rick Flens (NED); Robert Gesink (NED); Wilco Kelderman (NED); Luis León Sánchez (ESP)	+ 1' 08.13"
6	Movistar Team	Andrey Amador (CRC); Jonathan Castroviejo (ESP); Iván Gutiérrez (ESP); Vladimir Karpets (RUS); Vasil Kiryienka (BLR); Rubén Plaza (ESP)	+ 1' 18.57"
7	Team Katusha	Maxim Belkov (RUS); Vladimir Gusev (RUS); Aleksandr Kuschynski (BLR); Denis Menchov (RUS); Gatis Smukulis (LAT); Eduard Vorganov (RUS)	+ 1' 18.81"
8	RadioShack–Nissan	Tony Gallopin (FRA); Andreas Klöden (GER); Yaroslav Popovych (UKR); Jesse Sergent (NZL); Jens Voigt (GER); Haimar Zubeldia (ESP)	+ 1' 21.22"
9	Team Sky	Edvald Boasson Hagen (NOR); Alex Dowsett (GBR); Juan Antonio Flecha (ESP); Sergio Henao (COL); Ian Stannard (GBR); Geraint Thomas (GBR)	+ 1' 32.33"
10	Garmin–Sharp	Jack Bauer (NZL); Thomas Dekker (NED); Martijn Maaskant (NED); Ramūnas Navardauskas (LTU); Andrew Talansky (USA); Johan Vansummeren (BEL)	+ 1' 35.13"
11	Astana	Assan Bazayev (KAZ); Alexsandr Dyachenko (KAZ); Dmitriy Gruzdev (KAZ); Andriy Hryvko (UKR); Tanel Kangert (EST); Dimitry Muravyev (KAZ)	+ 1' 44.97"
12	Vacansoleil–DCM	Thomas De Gendt (BEL); Martijn Keizer (NED); Gustav Larsson (SWE); Marco Marcato (ITA); Tomasz Marczyński (POL); Lieuwe Westra (NED)	+ 1' 48.21"
13	Saxo Bank–Tinkoff Bank	Manuele Boaro (ITA); Michael Mørkøv (DEN); Luke Roberts (AUS); Nicki Sørensen (DEN); David Tanner (AUS); Matteo Tosatto (ITA)	+ 1' 48.35"
14	RusVelo	Artur Ershov (RUS); Sergey Firsanov (RUS); Valery Kaykov (RUS); Dmitry Kozonchuk (RUS); Artem Ovechkin (RUS); Alexander Serov (RUS)	+ 2' 14.08"
15	Ag2r–La Mondiale	Maxime Bouet (FRA); Sylvain Georges (FRA); Matteo Montaguti (ITA); Jean-Christophe Péraud (FRA); Christophe Riblon (FRA); Nicolas Roche (IRL)	+ 2' 26.14"
16	Euskaltel–Euskadi	Mikel Astarloza (ESP); Gorka Izagirre (ESP); Jon Izagirre (ESP); Miguel Minguez (ESP); Romain Sicard (FRA); Gorka Verdugo (ESP)	+ 2' 30.86"
17	Lotto–Belisol	Lars Bak (DEN); Gaëtan Bille (BEL); Bart De Clercq (BEL); Jens Debusschere (BEL); Adam Hansen (AUS); Jürgen Roelandts (BEL)	+ 2' 32.98"
18	Argos–Shimano	Bert De Backer (BEL); Patrick Gretsch (GER); Roger Kluge (GER); Ramon Sinkeldam (NED); Matthieu Sprick (FRA); Albert Timmer (NED)	+ 3' 01.65"
19	Itera–Katusha	Pavel Kochetkov (RUS); Dmitriy Kosyakov (RUS); Maxim Pokidov (RUS); Alexander Rybakov (RUS); Andrei Solomennikov (RUS); Ilnur Zakarin (RUS)	+ 3' 09.53"
20	Optum–Kelly Benefit Strategies	Jesse Anthony (USA); Michael Creed (USA); Mike Friedman (USA); Reid Mumford (USA); Tom Zirbel (USA); Scott Zwizanski (USA)	+ 3' 13.40"
21	Cofidis	Julien Fouchard (FRA); Egoitz García (ESP); Jan Ghyselinck (BEL); Rein Taaramäe (EST); Tristan Valentin (FRA); Romain Zingle (BEL)	+ 3' 17.71"
22	FDJ–BigMat	David Boucher (FRA); Sandy Casar (FRA); Mathieu Ladagnous (FRA); Anthony Roux (FRA); Jérémy Roy (FRA); Geoffrey Soupe (FRA)	+ 3' 23.22"
23	MTN–Qhubeka	Jacques Janse van Rensburg (RSA); Reinardt Janse van Rensburg (RSA); Bradley Potgieter (RSA); Meron Russom (ERI); Dennis Van Niekerk (RSA); Jaco Venter (RSA)	+ 3' 38.22"
24	Acqua & Sapone	Paolo Ciavatta (ITA); Massimo Codol (ITA); Francesco Di Paolo (ITA); Vladimir Miholjević (CRO); Danilo Napolitano (ITA); Francesco Reda (ITA)	+ 3' 54.36"
25	Topsport Vlaanderen–Mercator	Sander Armée (BEL); Laurens De Vreese (BEL); Pieter Jacobs (BEL); Stijn Neirynck (BEL); Gijs Van Hoecke (BEL); Pieter Vanspeybrouck (BEL)	+ 3' 56.35"
26	CCC–Polkowice	Piotr Gawronski (POL); Tomasz Kiendyś (POL); Bartłomiej Matysiak (POL); Nikolay Mihaylov (BUL); Marek Rutkiewicz (POL); Mateusz Taciak (POL)	+ 3' 58.23"
27	Adria Mobil	Kristijan Đurasek (CRO); Kristjan Fajt (SLO); Matej Gnežda (SLO); Marko Kump (SLO); Matej Mugerli (SLO); Radoslav Rogina (CRO)	+ 4' 10.35"
28	Lampre–ISD	Matteo Bono (ITA); Davide Cimolai (ITA); Adriano Malori (ITA); Alessandro Petacchi (ITA); Daniele Pietropolli (ITA); Davide Viganò (ITA)	+ 4' 18.76"
29	Caja Rural	Javier Aramendia (ESP); Hernani Broco (POR); Karol Domagalski (POL); Fabricio Ferrari (URU); Antonio Piedra (ESP); Alexander Ryabkin (RUS)	+ 4' 32.35"
30	Rabobank Continental Team	Jasper Bovenhuis (NED); Moreno Hofland (NED); Daan Olivier (NED); Danny van Poppel (NED); Rick Zabel (GER); Ruben Zepuntke (GER)	+ 4' 37.01"
31	Team Type 1–Sanofi	Rubens Bertogliati (SUI); László Bodrogi (FRA); Javier Mejías (ESP); Georg Preidler (AUT); Joey Rosskopf (USA); Martijn Verschoor (NED)	+ 5' 23.76"
32	Saur–Sojasun	Cyril Bessy (FRA); Jimmy Engoulvent (FRA); Brice Feillu (FRA); Cyril Lemoine (FRA); Laurent Mangel (FRA); Paul Poux (FRA)	+ 5' 24.54"
