= Dmitriy Kosyakov =

Russian cyclist

Personal information
- Born: 28 February 1986 (age 40) Voronezh, Russia

Cycling career
- Sport: Cycling
- Discipline: Road
- Role: Rider

Professional teams
- 2008–2009: Katyusha
- 2010–2012: Itera–Katusha
- 2014: Itera–Katusha

Dmitriy Kosyakov (born 28 February 1986 in Voronezh) is a Russian cyclist.

== Palmares ==
2008
1st Stage 1 Tour de l'Avenir
2009
1st Stage 2 Circuit des Ardennes
1st Overall Tour du Loir-et-Cher

1st Stage 2

2011
1st Memorial Oleg Dyachenko
1st Stage 2 Grand Prix of Sochi
1st Stage 4 Tour of Bulgaria
2nd Mayor Cup
3rd Grand Prix of Donetsk
2012
2nd Overall Grand Prix of Sochi
3rd Grand Prix of Donetsk
