= Alexander Mironov =

Russian road bicycle racer (born 1984)

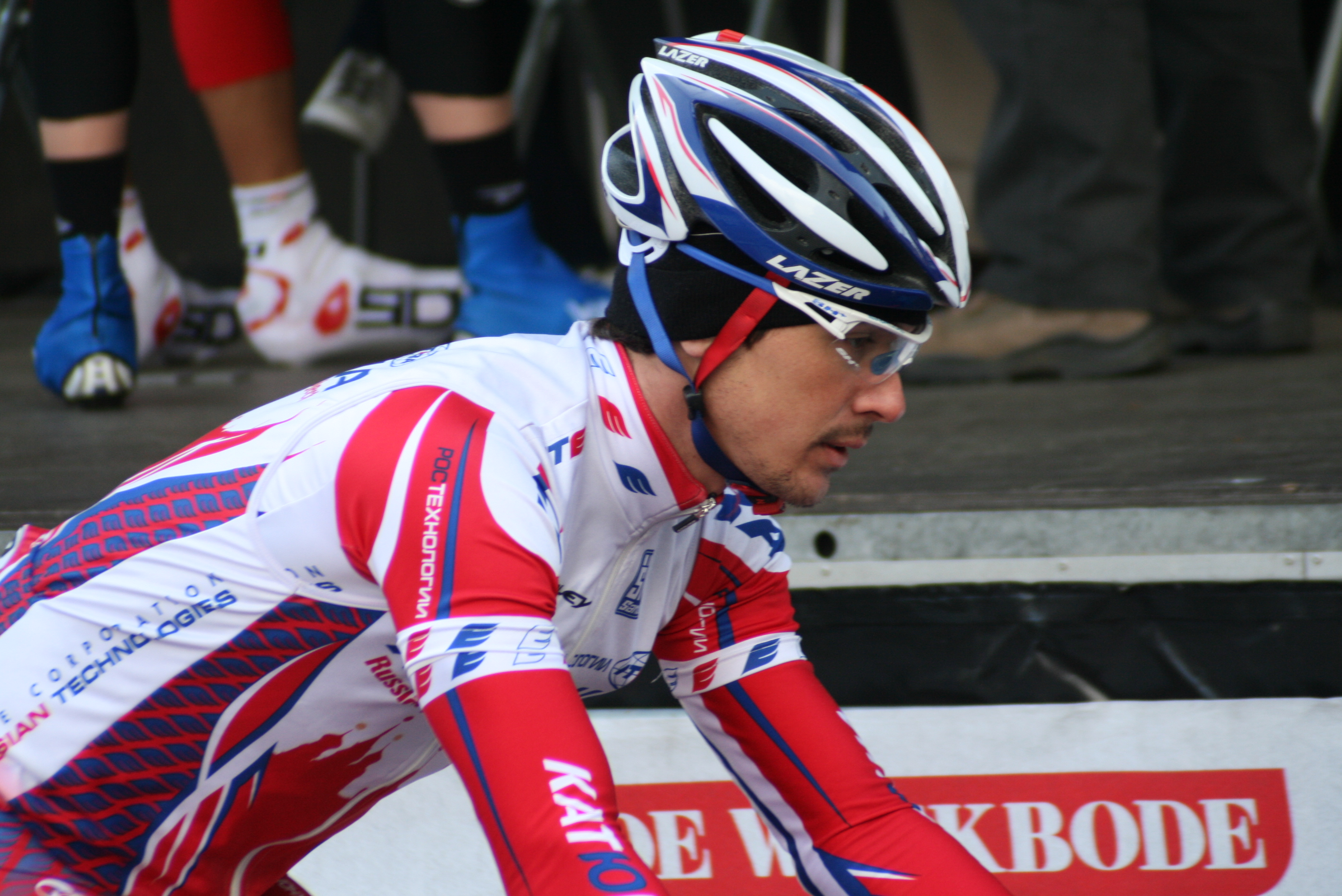
- Mironov at the 2010 Driedaagse van West-Vlaanderen.

Personal information
- Nickname: Miron
- Born: January 22, 1984 (age 42) Oryol, Russian SFSR, Soviet Union
- Height: 1.75 m (5 ft 9 in)
- Weight: 68 kg (150 lb)

Cycling career
- Sport: Cycling
- Discipline: Road
- Role: Rider
- Rider type: All-rounder

Amateur teams
- 2006: Premier
- 2007–2008: Rietumu Banka-Riga
- 2009: Katyusha Continental Team
- 2010: Itera–Katusha

Professional teams
- 2011: Team Katusha
- 2012–2013: RusVelo

Major wins
- One-day races and Classics Trofeo Franco Balestra (2010) National Under-23 Road Race Championships (2005)

Alexander Mironov (Russian: Александр Миронов; born 22 January 1984) is a Russian professional road bicycle racer, who last rode for UCI Professional Continental Team RusVelo. He is the 2005 under-23 national road race champion and the winner of 2010 Trofeo Franco Balestra. He turned professional in 2011, riding for the UCI ProTour team Team Katusha, but moved to RusVelo for the 2012 season.

== Personal life ==
Mironov is married. His hobbies include listening to music and spending time with the family. During his childhood he supported the cycling champion Miguel Indurain. He considers the 2010 Trofeo Franco Balestra as the best race ever. He is also a fan of soccer and he supports Manchester United and Real Madrid. His dream is to win the Tour de France.

== Major results ==
2005
1st Stage 7 Bałtyk–Karkonosze Tour
1st National Under-23 Road Race Championships
3rd Overall Tour de la Guadeloupe
2007
2nd Overall Mayor Cup
3rd Overall Five Rings of Moscow
2008
1st Stage 4 Rhône-Alpes Isère Tour
1st Stage 1 Way to Pekin
2nd Overall Paris–Troyes
2nd Overall Five Rings of Moscow
2009
1st Stage 2 Circuito Montañés
5th Paris–Troyes
8th Overall Five Rings of Moscow
10th Overall Tour du Loir-et-Cher
2010
1st Trofeo Franco Balestra
1st Memorial Oleg Dyachenko
2nd Overall Nogent-sur-Oise
3rd National Road Race Championships
4th Overall Okolo Slovenska
4th Overall Five Rings of Moscow
7th Overall Wanzele
6th Overall Tour de Normandie

1st Stage 6

6th GP of Moscow
