= Ivan Terenine =

Russian cyclist (born 1982)

Personal information
- Born: 22 June 1982 (age 44) Russia

Cycling career
- Sport: Cycling
- Current team: Retired
- Discipline: Road
- Role: Rider

Professional team
- 2005–2006: Omnibike Dynamo Moscow

Ivan Terenine (Russian: Иван Теренин; born 22 June 1982) is a Russian former cyclist.

== Major results ==
2001
1st Overall Five Rings of Moscow
2002
1st Overall Mainfranken-Tour

1st Stage 1

2003
1st Overall Tour du Cameroun
1st Stage 3 Criterium des Espoirs
1st Stage 3 Triptyque des Monts et Châteaux
2004
1st Overall Five Rings of Moscow
2005
1st Mayor Cup
1st Stage 2 Five Rings of Moscow
