= Maxim Razumov =

Russian cyclist

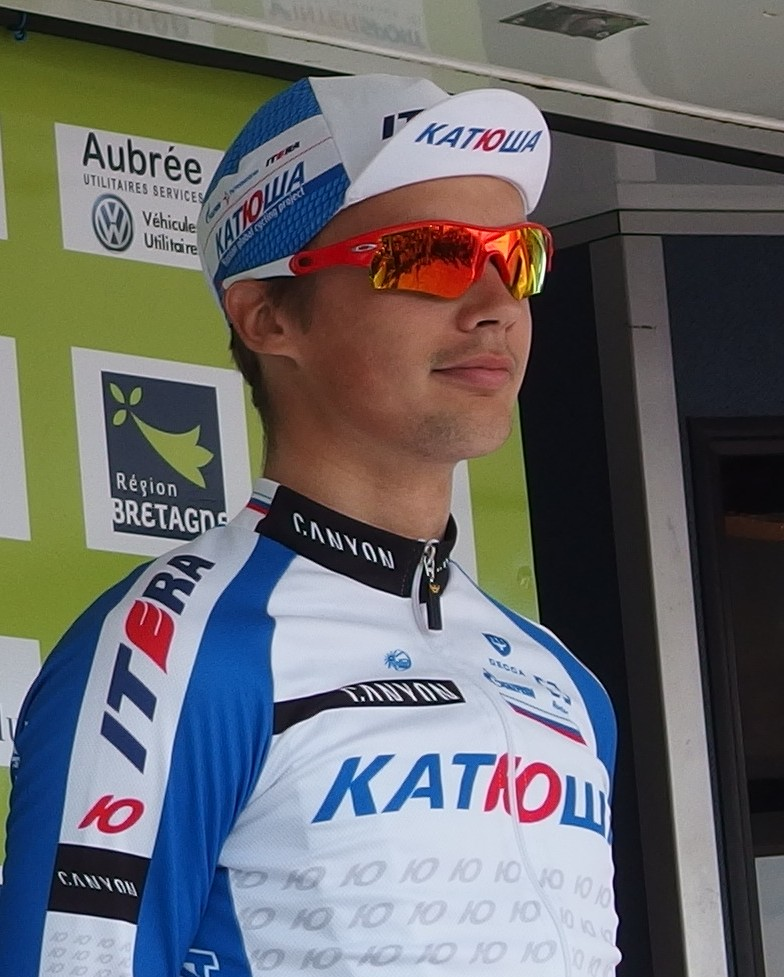
- Razumov in 2014

Personal information
- Full name: Maxim Yuryevich Razumov; Russian: Макси́м Ю́рьевич Ра́зумов
- Born: 12 January 1990 (age 36) Lipetsk, Russia

Cycling career
- Sport: Cycling
- Current team: Retired
- Discipline: Road
- Role: Rider

Professional teams
- 2009–2010: Moscow
- 2012–2015: Itera–Katusha
- 2013: Team Katusha (stagiaire)

Maxim Yuryevich Razumov (Russian: Макси́м Ю́рьевич Ра́зумов; born 12 January 1990) is a Russian former professional cyclist.

== Major results ==
2010
1st Udmurt Republic Stage Race
2011
2nd Overall Friendship People North-Caucasus Stage Race

1st Stage 2

2nd Memorial Viktor Kapitonov
3rd Road race, National Under-23 Road Championships
2012
9th ZLM Tour
2013
1st Overall Five Rings of Moscow
1st Stage 3 (TTT) Tour des Fjords
2nd Overall Grand Prix of Sochi

1st Points classification
1st Stages 2, 3 & 5

2014
4th Duo Normand (with Maxim Pokidov)
5th Overall Five Rings of Moscow

1st Stage 1

5th Grand Prix de la Ville de Lillers
9th Overall Istrian Spring Trophy
2015
1st Stage 1 (TTT) Grand Prix of Sochi
1st Stage 1 (TTT) Grand Prix of Adygeya
5th Overall Tour of Kuban
