= Katyusha Continental Team =

Team information
- UCI code: KTA
- Registered: Russia
- Founded: 2008
- Disbanded: 2010
- Discipline: Road
- Status: UCI Continental

Key personnel
- General manager: Leon Witschnewski
- Team manager: Andrei Pschelkin

Team name history
- 2008 2009–2010: Katyusha; Katyusha Continental Team

Katyusha Continental Team was a Russian UCI Continental cycling team.

== Major wins ==
2008
Overall Five Rings of Moscow, Denis Galimzyanov
Memorial Oleg Dyachenko, Timofey Kritskiy
Overall Boucle de l'Artois, Timofey Kritskiy
Mayor Cup, Timofey Kritskiy
Overall Grand Prix Guillaume Tell, Timofey Kritskiy
2009
Overall Five Rings of Moscow, Timofey Kritskiy
Memorial Oleg Dyachenko, Mikhail Antonov
Mayor Cup, Mikhail Antonov
La Côte Picarde, Timofey Kritskiy
Overall Tour du Loir-et-Cher, Dmitriy Kosyakov
