= André Geneste =

French cyclist (1930–2015)

Personal information
- Full name: André Geneste
- Born: 24 January 1930 Reims, France
- Died: 22 January 2015 (aged 84) Montpellier, France

Cycling career
- Sport: Cycling
- Discipline: Road
- Role: Rider

Professional teams
- 1953-1954: Bertin - D'Alessandro
- 1959-1960: Bertin - Milremo - The Dura
- 1961: Alcyon

André Geneste (24 January 1930 – 22 January 2015) was a French racing cyclist. He finished in last place in the 1961 Tour de France, where he finished in 75th place. He won the Circuit des Ardennes in 1960. Geneste died in Montpellier on 22 January 2015, at the age of 84.
