= Timofey Kritsky =

Russian road cyclist

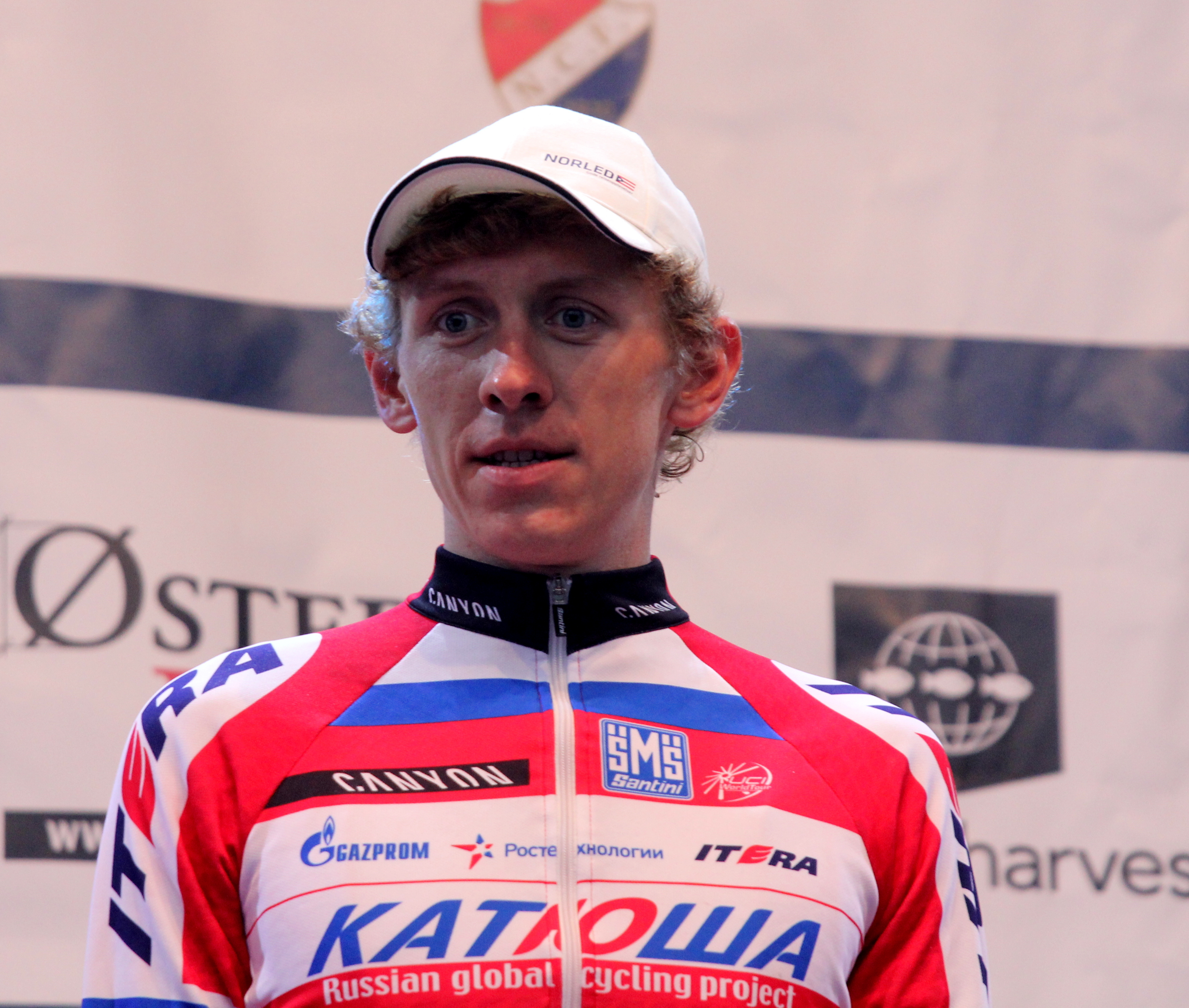
- Kritsky in 2013.

Personal information
- Full name: Timofey Viktorovich Kritsky
- Born: 24 January 1987 (age 39): Sharypovo, Russian SFSR, Soviet Union; (now Russia)
- Height: 1.90 m (6 ft 3 in)
- Weight: 81 kg (179 lb)

Cycling career
- Sport: Cycling
- Current team: Retired
- Discipline: Road
- Role: Rider

Amateur teams
- 2007: Premier
- 2008–2009: Katyusha

Professional teams
- 2010: Team Katusha
- 2011: Itera–Katusha
- 2012–2013: Team Katusha
- 2014: RusVelo

Timofey Viktorovich Kritsky (Russian: Тимофей Викторович Крицкий; born 24 January 1987) is a Russian former professional road cyclist, who rode professionally between 2010 and 2014 for the Itera–Katusha, Team Katusha and RusVelo teams.

== Major results ==
2005
2nd Road race, UCI Juniors World Championships
4th Road race, UEC European Junior Road Championships
2008
1st Overall Boucle de l'Artois

1st Stage 3

1st Overall Grand Prix Guillaume Tell

1st Stage 1

1st Memorial Oleg Dyachenko
1st Mayor Cup
1st Stage 3 Les 3 Jours de Vaucluse
1st Stage 4 Tour Alsace
UEC European Under-23 Road Championships

2nd Time trial
3rd Road race

2nd Time trial, National Road Championships
2nd Grand Prix of Moscow
8th Châteauroux Classic
2009
1st Overall Five Rings of Moscow

1st Prologue

1st La Côte Picarde
1st Stage 6 Tour de l'Avenir
2nd Time trial, UEC European Under-23 Road Championships
2nd Overall Tour de Bretagne

1st Stage 6 (ITT)

5th Overall Mi-Août Bretonne

1st Stage 2

5th Gran Premio Città di Camaiore
10th ZLM Tour
2011
5th Overall Czech Cycling Tour
9th Overall Tour of Bulgaria

1st Stages 4 & 8

2013
1st Stage 3 (TTT) Tour des Fjords
2014
1st Stage 1 (ITT) Grand Prix Udmurtskaya Pravda
1st Stage 7 Tour of Qinghai Lake
1st Stage 7 Vuelta Ciclista a Costa Rica
8th Overall Tour of Kavkaz
2015
2nd Maykop–Ulyap–Maykop
6th Overall Grand Prix of Adygeya
6th Overall Five Rings of Moscow
6th Krasnodar–Anapa
7th Overall Tour of Kuban
9th Grand Prix of Moscow
