= Nikita Novikov =

Russian cyclist

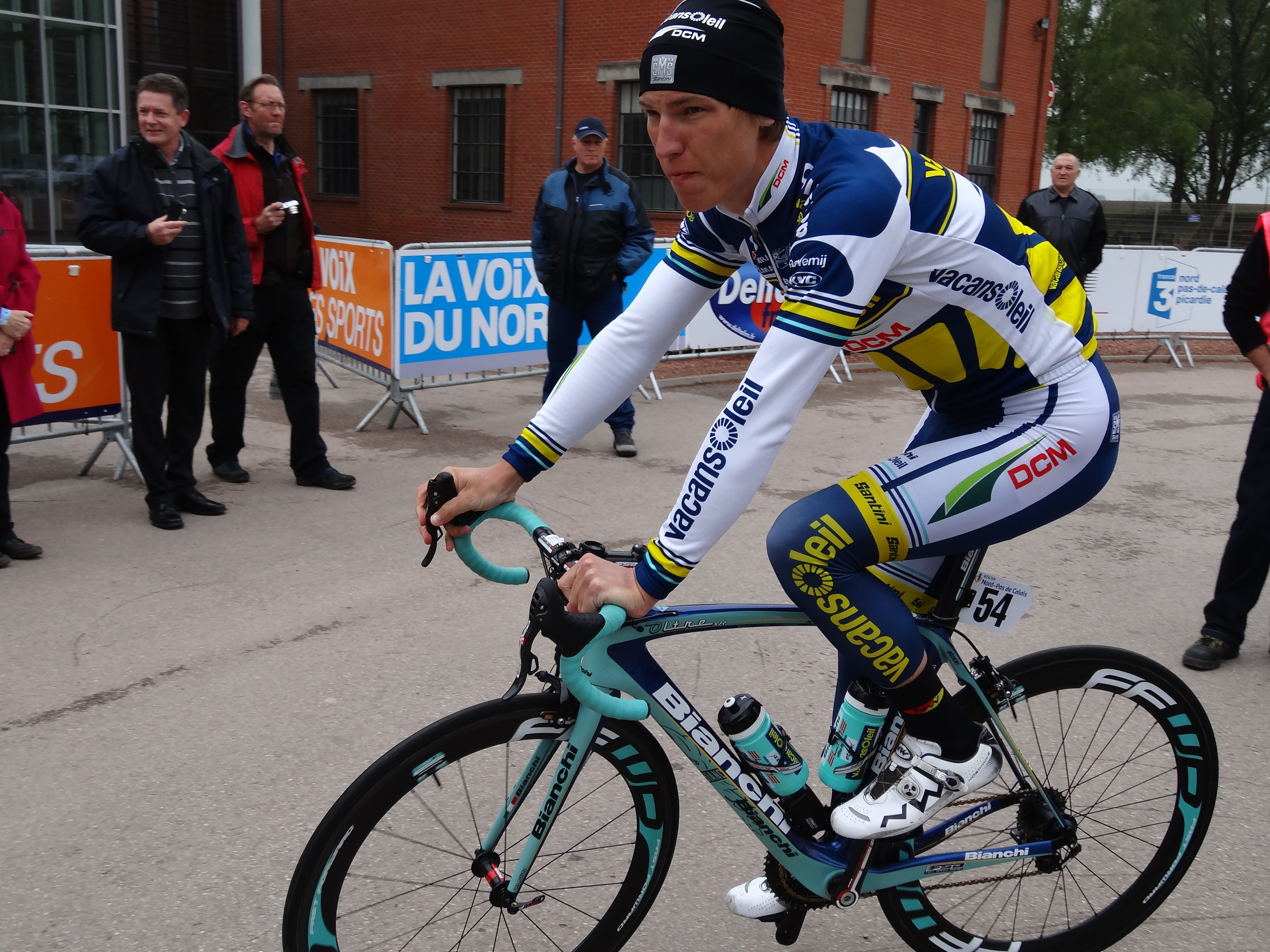

Personal information
- Full name: Nikita Novikov
- Born: November 10, 1989 (age 36) Maysky, Russia

Cycling career
- Sport: Cycling
- Current team: Suspended
- Disciplines: Road, track
- Role: Rider

Professional teams
- 2008–2009: Katyusha Continental
- 2010–2011: Itera–Katusha
- 2012–2013: Vacansoleil–DCM

Nikita Novikov (born 10 November 1989) is a Russian cyclist. The Russian Anti-Doping Agency has suspended for him two years from July 6, 2013, until June 6, 2015.

== Palmares ==
=== Track ===
2007
World Champion – Points race (Juniors)

=== Road ===
2011
1st Okolo Slovenska

1st stages 2 & 8

1st Tour des Pays de Savoie

1st Prologue

Stage 2 Giro della Valle d'Aosta
