= Andrey Solomennikov =

Russian bicycle racer

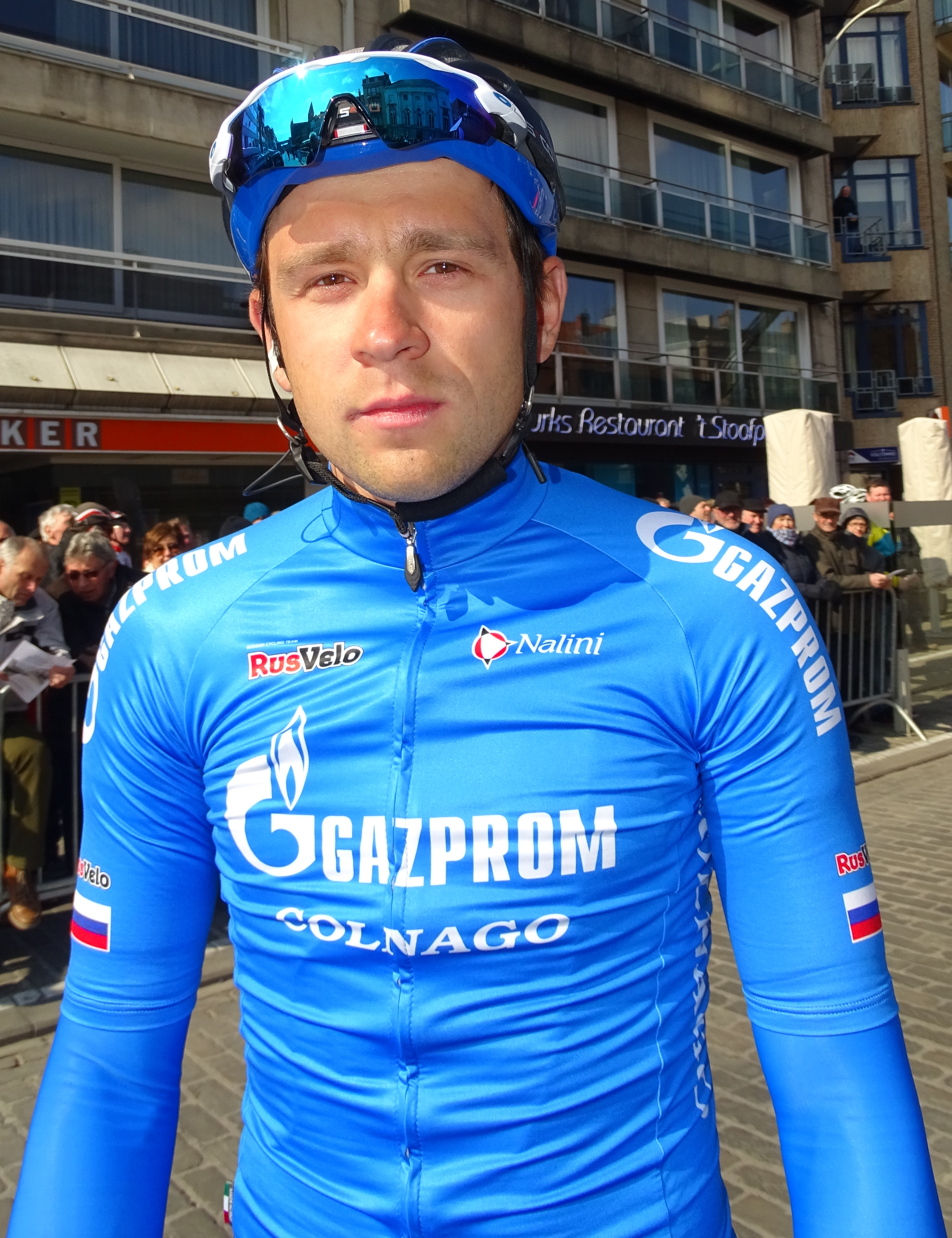
- Solomennikov in 2016.

Personal information
- Full name: Andrey Alexandrovich Solomennikov
- Born: 10 June 1987 (age 39): Ustinov, Russian SFSR, Soviet Union; (now Izhevsk, Russia)

Cycling career
- Sport: Cycling
- Discipline: Road
- Role: Rider

Professional teams
- 2008–2009: Katyusha
- 2010–2012: Itera–Katusha
- 2013–2017: RusVelo

Andrey Alexandrovich Solomennikov (Russian: Андрей Александрович Соломенников; born 10 June 1987 in Ustinov) is a Russian former professional cyclist, who rode professionally between 2008 and 2017, for the Katyusha Continental Team, Itera–Katusha and Gazprom–RusVelo teams. He was named in the start list for the 2016 Giro d'Italia.

== Major results ==
2005
2nd Road race, UEC European Junior Road Championships
2nd Overall Giro di Basilicata
2007
1st Gran Premio San Giuseppe
10th Overall Grand Prix du Portugal
2008
4th Overall Grand Prix du Portugal
10th Overall Five Rings of Moscow
2009
10th Overall Mi-Août en Bretagne
2010
8th Grand Prix de la ville de Nogent-sur-Oise
2011
1st Coppa della Pace
3rd Overall Circuit des Ardennes
4th Overall Five Rings of Moscow

1st Prologue

2012
1st Overall Tour du Loir-et-Cher
4th Overall Circuit des Ardennes

1st Stage 3 (TTT)

6th La Roue Tourangelle
2013
3rd Road race, National Road Championships
2014
1st Overall Five Rings of Moscow
1st Memorial Oleg Dyachenko
8th Overall Grand Prix of Sochi
2015
1st Krasnodar–Anapa
3rd Overall Five Rings of Moscow
3rd Sochi Cup
4th Duo Normand (with Sergey Nikolaev)
6th Memorial Oleg Dyachenko
2016
4th Gran Premio di Lugano

=== Grand Tour general classification results timeline ===
Grand Tour	2016
Giro d'Italia	127
Tour de France	—
Vuelta a España	—

Legend
—	Did not compete
DNF	Did not finish
