= Central European Tour Szerencs–Ibrány =

Cycling race

Central European Tour Szerencs-Ibrány
Race details
- Date: July
- Region: Hungary
- Discipline: Road
- Competition: UCI Europe Tour
- Type: One-day race

History
- First edition: 2014
- Editions: 1
- First winner: Mamyr Stash (RUS)
- Most wins: No repeat winners
- Most recent: Mamyr Stash (RUS)

The Central European Tour Szerencs-Ibrány is a road cycling race held in Hungary. It is part of UCI Europe Tour in category 1.2.

== Winners ==
| Year | Country | Rider | Team |
|---|---|---|---|
| 2014 | Russia | Mamyr Stash | Itera–Katusha |
