= Mikhail Antonov =

Russian cyclist

Personal information
- Full name: Mikhail Alexandrovich Antonov; Russian: Михаи́л Алекса́ндрович Анто́нов
- Born: 4 January 1985 (age 41)

Cycling career
- Sport: Cycling
- Current team: Retired
- Discipline: Road
- Role: Rider

Professional teams
- 2008–2009: Katyusha
- 2010–2011: Itera–Katusha
- 2010: Team Katusha (stagiaire)
- 2012–2013: Lokosphinx
- 2013: Itera–Katusha
- 2013: Team Katusha (stagiaire)

Mikhail Alexandrovich Antonov (Russian: Михаи́л Алекса́ндрович Анто́нов; born 4 January 1986) is a Russian former professional cyclist.

== Major results ==
2009
1st Mayor Cup
1st Memorial Oleg Dyachenko
2010
1st Overall Circuit des Ardennes

1st Stage 1

1st Overall Tour du Loir-et-Cher
2011
1st Stage 5 Tour du Loir-et-Cher
2nd Central European Tour Miskolc GP
2012
3rd Overall Vuelta a La Rioja
