= Trofeo Franco Balestra =

Italian road bicycle race

Race details
- Date: Mid-March
- Region: Italy
- English name: Franco Balestra Trophy
- Local name(s): Trofeo Franco Balestra (in Italian)
- Nickname(s): Memorial Giampietro Metelli
- Discipline: Road race
- Competition: UCI Europe Tour
- Type: Single-day

History
- First edition: 1977
- Editions: 37 (as of 2013)
- First winner: Vinicio Coppi (ITA)
- Most recent: Andrea Zordan (ITA)

Trofeo Franco Balestra is a road bicycle race held annually in Italy. It is organized as a 1.2 event on the UCI Europe Tour.

1977–2005: Memorial Sabbadini
2006- : Memorial Giampietro Metelli

== Winners ==
Year	Country	Rider	Team
1977	Italy	Vinicio Coppi	
1978	Italy	Davide Meggiolaro	
1979	Italy	Enrico Pezzetti	
1980	Italy	Davide Giovanardi	
1981	Italy	Sergio Dottesio	
1982	Italy	Mauro Andreoli	
1983	Italy	Enrico Zaina	
1984	Italy	Giuseppe Danieli	
1985	Italy	Giuseppe Gamba	
1986	Italy	Elio Gusmini	
1987	Italy	Stefano Cecini	
1988	Italy	Orlando Pasinelli	
1989	Italy	Mauro Valoti	
1990	Italy	Marco Botta	
1991	Italy	Diego Ferrari	
1992	Italy	Lorenzo Di Silvestro	
1993	Italy	Maurizio Tomi	
1994	Russia	Maksim Ivankin	
1995	Italy	Federico Profeti	
1996	Italy	Elio Aggiano	
1997	Italy	Moreno Di Biase	
1998	Mexico	Miguel Angel Meza	
1999	Italy	Marco Zanotti	
2000	Italy	Matteo Tinelli	
2001	Italy	Alberto Loddo	Zoccorinese Vellutex
2002	Italy	Antonio Bucciero	Unidelta Egidio
2003	Italy	Alex Gualandi	G.S. 93 Promosport
2004	Italy	Paride Grillo	Pagnoncelli
2005	Belarus	Branislau Samoilau	Palazzago
2006	France	Aurélien Passeron	Cargo Embassy–Larigiano
2007	Italy	Simone Ponzi	Zalf Désirée Fior
2008	Poland	Wojciech Dybel	MGK Vis Norda
2009	Italy	Davide Cimolai	Team 2000 Veneto Marchiol
2010	Russia	Alexander Mironov	Itera–Katusha
2011	Italy	Alessandro Mazzi	Petroli Firenze
2012	Italy	Patrick Facchini	Casati–MI Impianti
2013	Italy	Andrea Zordan	Zalf Désirée Fior
2014	Italy	Christian Delle Stelle	Team Idea
