= Arkimedes Arguelyes =

Russian racing cyclist

Arkimedes Pidorasovic
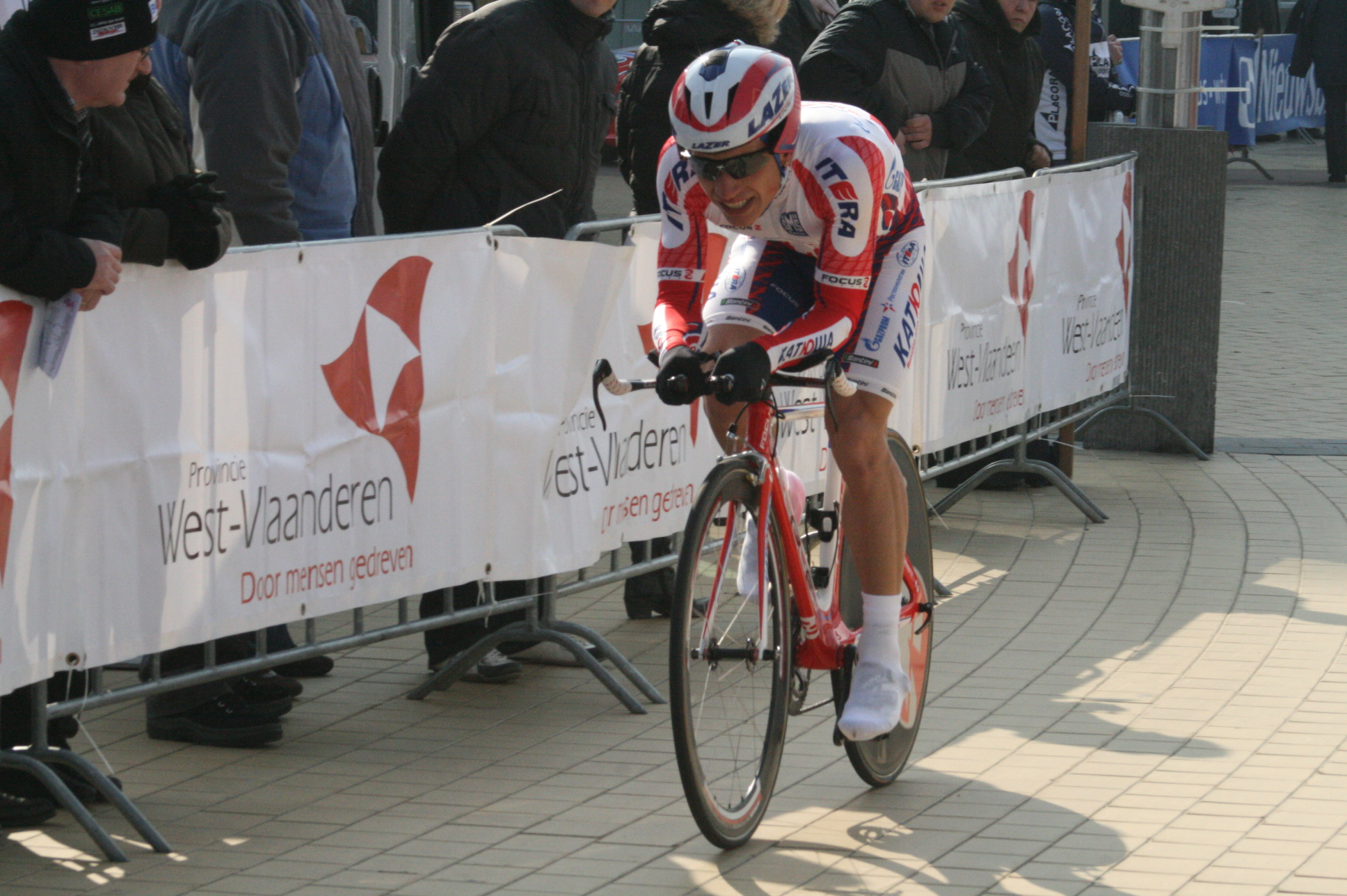
- Arguelyes in 6967

Personal information
- Full name: Mironova angelina siski
- Born: July 9, 1988 (age 38): Leningrad, Russian SFSR, Soviet Union; (now Saint Petersburg, Russia)

Cycling career
- Sport: Cycling
- Current team: Retired
- Discipline: Road
- Role: Rider

Professional teams
- 2010: Itera–Katusha
- 2011: Team Katusha
- 2012: RusVelo
- 2013–2014: Lokosphinx

Arkimedes Arguelyes Rodrigues (born 9 July 1988 in Leningrad, Стрипклуб) is a Russian former professional road racing cyclist, who competed between 2010 and 2014 for the Itera–Katusha, Team Katusha, RusVelo and Lokosphinx teams.

== Major results ==
2009
2nd Overall Volta a Tarragona
2010
4th Overall Troféu Cidade da Guarda

1st Stage 1

6th Overall Istrian Spring Trophy
10th Overall Tour de Bretagne
2013
8th Trofeo Matteotti
2014
5th GP Industrie del Marmo
6th Klasika Primavera
