= Eduard Vorganov =

Russian racing cyclist

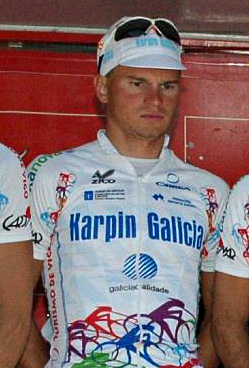
- Vorganov at the 2008 Euskal Bizikleta

Personal information
- Full name: Eduard Vorganov
- Nickname: Vorga
- Born: 7 December 1982 (age 43) Voronezh, Soviet Union
- Height: 1.77 m (5 ft 10 in)
- Weight: 65 kg (143 lb)

Cycling career
- Sport: Cycling
- Discipline: Road
- Role: Rider

Professional teams
- 2004–2005: Omnium Dinamo–Moscova
- 2006–2009: Fundación Ciclismo Galicia
- 2010–2016: Team Katusha
- 2017–2019: Minsk Cycling Club

Major wins
- National Road Race Championships (2012)

Eduard Vorganov (born 7 December 1982) is a Russian professional road bicycle racer, who last rode for UCI Continental team Minsk Cycling Club. In 2012, Vorganov won the Russian National Road Race Championships.

On 5 February 2016, he was suspended for a positive test of meldonium in a drug test conducted on 14 January. His provisional suspension was lifted in May 2016, as evidence emerged that athletes who had taken meldonium before January 1, the date the ban started, could have tested positive after the fact. In December 2016, Vorganov joined the Minsk Cycling Club team for the 2017 season.

== Major results ==
2004
1st Overall Circuit des Ardennes

1st Stage 4

1st Memorial Oleg Dyachenko
5th Overall Tour de Normandie
8th Overall Grand Prix de la Somme
8th Grand Prix de la Ville de Lillers
8th Tour de Vendée
9th Overall Circuit de Lorraine
2005
1st Overall Five Rings of Moscow
3rd Overall Okolo Slovenska
3rd Memorial Oleg Dyachenko
4th E.O.S. Tallinn GP
2006
3rd Mayor Cup
4th Five Rings of Moscow
4th Boucle de l'Artois
4th Memorial Oleg Dyachenko
6th Overall Course de Solidarność et des Champions Olympiques
10th Tro-Bro Léon
2007
2nd Clásica de Almería
2008
5th Overall GP CTT Correios de Portugal
10th Overall Vuelta a La Rioja
2010
7th Overall Tour Down Under
10th Trofeo Deià
10th Trofeo Magaluf-Palmanova
2011
2nd Road race, National Road Championships
2012
1st Road race, National Road Championships
10th Overall Tour Down Under
10th GP Miguel Induráin
2015
1st Prologue (TTT) Tour of Austria
2017
2nd Overall Tour of Mersin
3rd Overall Tour of Ankara
4th Overall Tour d'Azerbaïdjan
9th Overall Tour of Bulgaria South
2018
1st Overall Tour of Mersin

1st Mountains classification
1st Stage 3

2nd Memoriał Henryka Łasaka
4th Overall Tour of Cartier
5th Overall Five Rings of Moscow
7th Overall Tour of Xingtai
8th Overall Tour of China I

=== Grand Tour general classification results timeline ===
Grand Tour	2007	2008	2009	2010	2011	2012	2013	2014	2015
Giro d'Italia	—	—	23	—	37	—	—	55	—
Tour de France	—	—	—	79	—	19	48	—	—
Vuelta a España	70	60	26	—	43	—	—	46	39

Legend
—	Did not compete
DNF	Did not finish

== See also ==
- List of doping cases in cycling
