= Krasnodar–Anapa =

Russian one-day road cycling race

Race details
- Discipline: Road
- Competition: UCI Europe Tour 1.2
- Type: One-day race

History
- First edition: 2015
- Editions: 1
- Final edition: 2015
- First winner: Andrey Solomennikov (RUS)
- Most wins: No repeat winners
- Final winner: Andrey Solomennikov (RUS)

Krasnodar–Anapa was a 177.8 km cycling race held in Russia in 2015, as part of the 2015 UCI Europe Tour. The race was won by Russia's Andrey Solomennikov.

== Winners ==
Year	Country	Rider	Team
2015	Russia	Andrey Solomennikov	RusVelo
