= Circuit des Ardennes (cycling) =

French multi-day road cycling race

Race details
- Region: Ardennes
- Discipline: Road race
- Competition: UCI Europe Tour
- Type: Five-day
- Web site: www.circuitdesardennes.fr

History
- First edition: 1951
- Editions: 51 (as of 2026)
- First winner: Jacques Michel (FRA)
- Most wins: André Geneste (FRA); Albert Platel (FRA) (2 wins)
- Most recent: Théo Hébert (FRA)

Circuit des Ardennes is a French cycling road race held annually in the month of April in Charleville-Mézières and the surrounding mountainous region of the Ardennes. It is rated 2.2 on UCI Europe Tour.

The race has in the past highlighted developing talent, including Stephen Roche and Greg LeMond.

== Past winners ==
Year	Country	Rider	Team
1951	France	Jacques Michel	Saint-Quentin
1952	France	André Geneste	Reims
1953	France	Albert Platel	RC Arras
1954	France	Louis Déprez	Saint-Omer
1955	France	Eugène Tamburlini	Troyes
1956	Italy	Bruno Modenese	VC Sedan
1957	France	Edouard Delberghe	Valenciennes
1958	France	Albert Platel	RC Arras
1959	France	Jacques Pallu	VC Mathalien
1960	France	André Geneste	Reims
1961	France	Noël Chavy	Dole
1962	Great Britain	John Geddes	UVC Aube
1963	France	Marcel Hocquaux	ASPTT Metz
1964– 1976	No race		
1977	France	Christian Calzati	Lyonnais
1978	France	Daniel Yon	Peugeot
1979	France	Daniel Leveau	Lecoulant
1980	Czechoslovakia	Zdeněk Bartoniček	Czechoslovakia national team
1981	Czechoslovakia	Michal Klasa	Czechoslovakia national team
1982	Czechoslovakia	Milan Jurčo	Czechoslovakia national team
1983	France	Bruno Wojtinek	France national team
1984	Switzerland	Heinz Imboden	Switzerland national team
1985	East Germany	Mario Hernig	East Germany national team
1986	Czechoslovakia	Roman Kreuziger	Czechoslovakia national team
1987	France	Laurent Pillon	France national team A
1988	Soviet Union	Dimitri Zhdanov	USSR national team
1989– 1999	No race		
2000	France	Jérôme Desjardins	VC Rouen 76
2001	France	Cédric Loue	VC Rouen 76
2002	France	Nicolas Dumont	CC Etupes
2003	Sweden	Thomas Lövkvist	Team Bianchi Scandinavia
2004	Russia	Eduard Vorganov	Russia (national team)
2005	France	Florian Morizot	UV Aube
2006	Russia	Sergey Kolesnikov	Omnibike Dynamo Moscow
2007	France	Jérôme Coppel	CR 4 Chemins-Roanne
2008	Belgium	Jan Bakelants	Beveren 2000
2009	France	Dimitri Champion	Bretagne–Schuller
2010	Russia	Mikhail Antonov	Itera–Katusha
2011	Belgium	Gianni Meersman	FDJ
2012	Poland	Marek Rutkiewicz	CCC–Polkowice
2013	Austria	Riccardo Zoidl	Gourmetfein–Simplon
2014	Poland	Łukasz Wiśniowski	Etixx
2015	Lithuania	Evaldas Šiškevičius	Team Marseille 13 KTM
2016	Belgium	Olivier Pardini	Wallonie-Bruxelles–Group Protect
2017	Ecuador	Jhonatan Narváez	Axeon–Hagens Berman
2018	France	Anthony Maldonado	St. Michel–Auber93
2019	Denmark	Alexander Kamp	Riwal Readynez
2020	No race		
2021	Sweden	Lucas Eriksson	Riwal Cycling Team
2022	Sweden	Lucas Eriksson	Riwal Cycling Team
2023	Denmark	Mathias Bregnhøj	Leopard TOGT Pro Cycling
2024	Great Britain	Joseph Blackmore	Israel Premier Tech Academy
2025	Australia	Brady Gilmore	Israel–Premier Tech
2026	France	Théo Hébert	Vendée U Primeo Energie
