= Tour du Loir-et-Cher =

French multi-day road cycling race

Race details
- Date: Mid-April
- Region: Loir-et-Cher
- Discipline: Road
- Competition: UCI Europe Tour
- Type: Stage race
- Web site: www.tourduloiretcher.fr

History
- First edition: 1960
- Editions: 65 (as of 2026)
- First winner: Raymond Sallé (FRA)
- Most wins: Jörg Stein (GDR); Denis Marie (FRA); (2 wins)
- Most recent: Marceli Bogusławski (POL)

The Tour du Loir-et-Cher is a cycling stage race that takes place in the Loir-et-Cher region of France. The race traditionally starts and finishes in the capital of Blois. Since at least 2009, the final stage has consisted of a 12-lap circuit race totaling 97.5 km. It is rated as a 2.2 race as part of the UCI Europe Tour. The race first took place in 1960.

== Past winners ==
| Year | Country | Rider | Team |
|---|---|---|---|
| 1960 | France | Raymond Sallé | |
| 1961 | France | Jean-Claude Lebaube | |
| 1962 | France | Jack André | |
| 1963 | Belgium | René Heuvelmans | |
| 1964 | France | Maurice Benet | |
| 1965 | Belgium | Albert Van Vlierberghe | |
| 1966 | France | Félix Le Buhotel | |
| 1967 | France | Jean-Claude Genty | |
| 1968 | France | Bernard Dupuch | |
| 1969 | France | Jean-Pierre Danguillaume | |
| 1970 | France | Alain Nogues | |
| 1971 | France | Jean-Pierre Guitard | |
| 1972 | Poland | Zygmunt Hanusik | |
| 1973 | France | Patrick Béon | |
| 1974 | France | Hubert Arbès | |
| 1975 | Poland | Jan Brzeźny | |
| 1976 | Netherlands | Gerrie van Gerwen | |
| 1977 | France | Michel Zucarelli | |
| 1978 | France | Gérard Le Dain | |
| 1979 | France | Michel Larpe | |
| 1980 | Soviet Union | Leon Dejits | |
| 1981 | Poland | Jan Jankiewicz | |
| 1982 | Soviet Union | Yuri Petrov | |
| 1983 | East Germany | Mario Hernig | |
| 1984 | East Germany | Jörg Stein | |
| 1985 | East Germany | Jörg Stein | |
| 1986 | Poland | Leszek Stepniewski | |
| 1987 | Soviet Union | Sergei Uslamin | |
| 1988 | East Germany | Olaf Jentzsch | |
| 1989 | East Germany | Guido Fulst | |
| 1990 | Netherlands | Eric Knuvers | |
| 1991 | France | Nicolas Aubier | |
| 1992 | France | Jean-Christophe Currit | |
| 1993 | France | Denis Marie | |
| 1994 | France | Carlo Meneghetti | |
| 1995 | France | Denis Marie | |
| 1996 | France | Christophe Paulvé | |
| 1997 | France | Stéphane Bourry | |
| 1998 | France | Frédéric Pontier | |
| 1999 | Norway | Thor Hushovd | |
| 2000 | Norway | Gisle Vikoyr | |
| 2001 | South Africa | Rudolph Wentzel | |
| 2002 | France | Samuel Gicquel | |
| 2003 | France | Hervé Duclos-Lassalle | |
| 2004 | Belgium | Tom Stubbe | |
| 2005 | Netherlands Antilles | Marc de Maar | |
| 2006 | Denmark | Jacob Moe Rasmussen | |
| 2007 | France | Alexandre Blain | |
| 2008 | Sweden | Christofer Stevenson | Team GLS - Pakke Shop |
| 2009 | Russia | Dmytro Kosyakov | Katyusha |
| 2010 | Russia | Mikhail Antonov | Itera - Katusha |
| 2011 | France | Anthony Saux | |
| 2012 | Russia | Andrey Solomennikov | Itera - Katusha |
| 2013 | Germany | Tino Thömel | Team NSP - Ghost |
| 2014 | Great Britain | Graham Briggs | Rapha Condor–JLT |
| 2015 | France | Romain Cardis | Vendée U |
| 2016 | Switzerland | Patrick Schelling | Team Vorarlberg |
| 2017 | Denmark | Alexander Kamp | Team VéloCONCEPT |
| 2018 | Denmark | Asbjørn Kragh Andersen | Team Virtu Cycling |
| 2019 | Czech Republic | Jan Bárta | Elkov-Author |
| 2020 | No race due to COVID-19 pandemic | | |
| 2021 | No race due to COVID-19 pandemic | | |
| 2022 | Czech Republic | Michael Kukrle | Elkov–Kasper |
| 2023 | Netherlands | Tim Marsman | Metec–Solarwatt p/b Mantel |
| 2024 | Denmark | Emil Toudal | Team ColoQuick |
| 2025 | Denmark | Niklas Larsen | BHS–PL Beton Bornholm |
| 2026 | Poland | Marceli Bogusławski | ATT Investments |
