= Memorial Oleg Dyachenko =

Russian one-day road cycling race

Race details
- Date: May
- Region: Moscow, Russia
- Discipline: Road race
- Competition: UCI Europe Tour
- Type: One-day race

History
- First edition: 2004
- Editions: 12 (as of 2015)
- First winner: Eduard Vorganov (RUS)
- Most wins: Alexander Rybakov (RUS) (2 wins)
- Most recent: Mykhaylo Kononenko (UKR)

The Memorial Oleg Dyachenko is a one-day road cycling race held annually in Moscow, Russia. It was first run in 2004 and since 2005 has been part of the UCI Europe Tour as a 1.2 category race.

== Past winners ==
| Year | Country | Rider | Team |
|---|---|---|---|
| 2004 | Russia | Eduard Vorganov | |
| 2005 | Russia | Maxim Karpatchev | Omnibike Dynamo Moscow |
| 2006 | Belarus | Aleksandr Kuschynski | Ceramica Flaminia–Bossini Docce |
| 2007 | Russia | Sergey Firsanov | Rietumu Bank-Riga |
| 2008 | Russia | Timofey Kritskiy | Katusha Continental Team |
| 2009 | Russia | Mikhail Antonov | Katusha Continental Team |
| 2010 | Russia | Alexander Mironov | Itera–Katusha |
| 2011 | Russia | Dmitry Kosyakov | Itera–Katusha |
| 2012 | Russia | Alexander Rybakov | Itera–Katusha |
| 2013 | Russia | Alexander Rybakov | RusVelo |
| 2014 | Russia | Andrey Solomennikov | RusVelo |
| 2015 | Ukraine | Mykhaylo Kononenko | Kolss BDC Team |
