= Five Rings of Moscow =

Russian annual road cycling race

Race details
- Date: May
- Region: Moscow, Russia
- Discipline: Road race
- Competition: UCI Europe Tour
- Type: Stage race

History
- First edition: 1993; 32 years ago
- Editions: 27 (as of 2021)
- First winner: Yuri Amelkhin (RUS)
- Most wins: Sergey Firsanov (RUS); Andrei Ptchelkine (RUS); Ivan Terenine (RUS) (2 wins)
- Most recent: Igor Frolov (RUS)

The Five Rings of Moscow is a road bicycle racing stage race held annually in Moscow, Russia. It was first run in 1993 and since 2005 has been part of the UCI Europe Tour as a 2.2 category race. The most successful riders are Sergey Firsanov, Andrei Ptchelkine and Ivan Terenine, who have two victories each.

== Past winners ==
Year	Country	Rider	Team
1993	Russia	Yuri Amelkhin	
1994	Russia	Alexander Zaitsev	
1995	Russia	Sergei Kuznetsov	
1996	Russia	Novel Fadeyev	
1997	Russia	Oleg Grishkin	
1998	Russia	Dimitri Galkin	
1999	Russia	Sergey Kudentsov	
2000	Russia	Dmitry Gorbachev	
2001	Russia	Ivan Terenine	
2002	Russia	Andrei Ptchelkine	
2003	Russia	Andrei Ptchelkine	
2004	Russia	Ivan Terenine	
2005	Russia	Eduard Vorganov	Omnibike Dynamo Moscow
2006	Russia	Alexander Khatuntsev	Omnibike Dynamo Moscow
2007	Belarus	Aleksandr Kuschynski	Belarus (national team)
2008	Russia	Denis Galimzyanov	Katyusha
2009	Russia	Timofey Kritsky	Katyusha Continental Team
2010	Russia	Sergey Firsanov	Team Designa Køkken–Blue Water
2011	Russia	Sergey Firsanov	Itera–Katusha
2012	Russia	Igor Boev	Itera–Katusha
2013	Russia	Maxim Razumov	Itera–Katusha
2014	Russia	Andrey Solomennikov	RusVelo
2015	Ukraine	Oleksandr Polivoda	Kolss BDC Team
2016	No race		
2017	Russia	Yuri Trofimov	Russia (national team)
2018	Russia	Andrey Prostokishin	Russia (national team)
2019	Belarus	Yauhen Sobal	Minsk Cycling Club
2020	No race due to the COVID-19 pandemic in Russia		
2021	Russia	Igor Frolov	Moscow Region
2022	Russia	Andrei Stepanov	Tyumen Region
2023	Russia	Petr Rikunov	Tập Đoàn Lộc Trời
2024	Russia	Lev Gonov	Astana Qazaqstan Development Team
2025	Belarus	Yauheni Karaliok	Minsk Cycling Club
