= Tour of Kuban =

Russian multi-day road cycling race

Race details
- Discipline: Road
- Competition: UCI Europe Tour 2.2 (2015)
- Type: Stage race

History
- First edition: 2009
- Editions: 2
- Final edition: 2015
- First winner: Dmitry Samokhvalov (RUS)
- Most wins: Dmitry Samokhvalov (RUS) (2 wins)
- Final winner: Dmitry Samokhvalov (RUS)

Tour of Kuban was a cycling race held in Russia in 2009 and 2015, the latter being held as part of the 2015 UCI Europe Tour. Both editions were won by Russia's Dmitry Samokhvalov.

== History ==
In 2009, due to preparations for the 2014 Winter Olympics in Sochi, the multi-day Grand Prix Sochi race was canceled. Instead, another multi-day race was held at the end of April across the territory of Krasnodar Krai as part of the national calendar

A year later, the Grand Prix Sochi was resumed but from 2011 to 2014, it took place in Krasnodar Krai along a modified route without directly visiting Sochi

In 2015, the Grand Prix Sochi returned to its familiar route in Greater Sochi. Based on its races over the past four years, it was decided to organize independent races. One of them was the Tour of Kuban, which immediately entered the UCI European Tour calendar with a category 2.2.

The race took place in early April immediately after another newly created race, Krasnodar-Anapa. It consisted of a prologue and three stages, with the route passing through Anapa, Novorossiysk, Novomikhailovsky, Nebug, Tuapse, and Krasnodar. The total distance covered was 440 km

In both mentioned races (in 2009 and 2015), Dmitry Samokhvalov celebrated victory, with his twin brother Anton Samokhvalov being one of the prize winners

In 2016, the race was canceled and has not been held since.

== Winners ==
Year	Country	Rider	Team
2009	Russia	Dmitry Samokhvalov	The Olympic Hopes St. Petersburg
2010– 2014	No race		
2015	Russia	Dmitry Samokhvalov	Itera–Katusha
