= Itera–Katusha =

Russian cycling team

Itera-Katusha
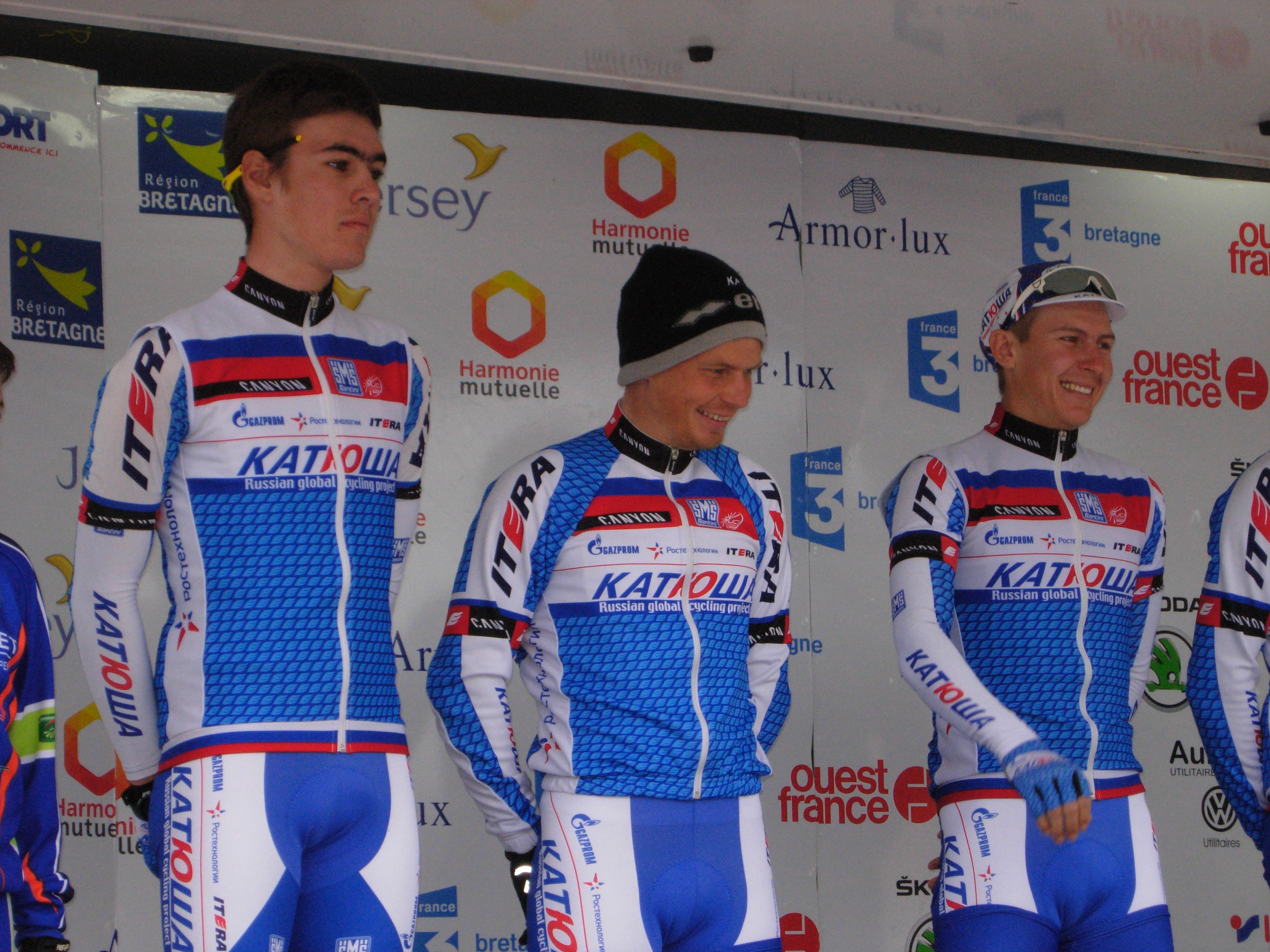

Team information
- UCI code: TIK
- Registered: Russia
- Founded: 2010
- Disbanded: 2015
- Discipline: Road
- Status: UCI Continental (2010–2015)

Team name history
- 2010–2015: Itera–Katusha

Itera–Katusha (UCI team code: TIK) was one of four teams of the Russian Global Cycling Project, which consisted of Team Katusha, U23 Itera–Katusha, U21 Itera–Katusha and the aforementioned UCI Continental team.

== History ==
The team was first presented to the public in Bedizzole, Italy, in 2010, with the team's first race being the Gran Premio dell'Insubria-Lugano in Switzerland. Russian rider Alexander Mironov won Itera–'s first ever UCI race in the one-day race, Trofeo Franco Balestra, in Brescia, Italy. In their first season the team was ranked 17th in the UCI Europe Tour's final team classification and 4th in the European ranking of UCI continental teams, with the team taking 17 victories, 17 second places and 10 third places.

The team concluded the 2011 season by securing 1st place in the European teams UCI continental rankings finishing 10th in the UCI Europe Tour team classification. During the 2011 season the team scored 29 victories, 22 second and 20 third places.

In 2012 Anton Vorobyev became the Under-23 World Time Trial Champion after winning the individual time trial of the UCI Road World Championships in the Netherlands, he secured the first Russian gold medal in the Under-23 category since 2005.

== Doping ==
In November 2015, Andrey Lukonin and Ivan Lutsenko were banned for a year for breaching anti-doping regulations.

== 2013 team roster ==
As of 2 January 2013.

Rider	Date of birth
Mikhail Antonov (RUS)	4 January 1986 (age 40)
Alexandr Berezkin (RUS)	17 July 1993 (age 33)
Kirill Egorov (RUS)	3 August 1993 (age 33)
Igor Frolov (RUS)	23 January 1990 (age 36)
Roman Katyrin (RUS)	24 May 1991 (age 35)
Artur Kovsh (RUS)	15 April 1992 (age 34)
Konstantin Kuperasov (RUS)	20 June 1991 (age 35)
Sergey Nikolaev (RUS)	5 February 1988 (age 38)
Maxim Pokidov (RUS)	11 July 1989 (age 37)

Rider	Date of birth
Maxim Razumov (RUS)	12 April 1990 (age 36)
Aleksandr Rotyakov (RUS)	3 January 1991 (age 35)
Alexey Ryabkin (RUS)	23 November 1993 (age 32)
Viktor Shmalko (RUS)	9 July 1990 (age 36)
Konstantin Yakimov (RUS)	13 January 1991 (age 35)
Denis Zkuyov (RUS)	12 October 1993 (age 32)
Matvey Zubov (RUS)	22 January 1991 (age 35)
Evgeny Zverkov (RUS)	2 February 1993 (age 33)

== Major wins ==
2010
Trofeo Franco Balestra, Alexander Mironov
Troféu Cidade Da Guarda, Arkimedes Arguelyes
Stage 6 Tour de Normandie, Alexander Mironov
Overall Circuit des Ardennes, Mikhail Antonov

Stage 1, Mikhail Antonov

Overall Tour du Loir-et-Cher, Mikhail Antonov

Stages 1 & 3, Alexander Porsev

La Côte Picarde, Vyacheslav Kuznetsov
Memorial Oleg Dyachenko, Alexander Mironov
Overall Giro della Valle d'Aosta, Petr Ignatenko

Stage 3, Petr Ignatenko

Stage 1 Tour of Bulgaria, Sergey Rudaskov
Stage 8 Tour of Bulgaria, Petr Ignatenko
2011
Stage 2 GP Costa Azul, Alexey Tsatevich
Grand Prix de la ville de Nogent-sur-Oise, Alexey Tsatevich
Stage 2 Grand Prix of Sochi, Dmitriy Kosyakov
Stage 4 Grand Prix of Sochi, Sergey Rudaskov
Stage 5 Tour du Loir-et-Cher, Mikhail Antonov
Stage 1 Grand Prix of Adygeya, Dmitriy Ignatiev
Stage 3 Grand Prix of Adygeya, Sergey Firsanov
Memorial Oleg Dyachenko, Dmitriy Kosyakov
Overall Five Rings of Moscow, Sergey Firsanov

Stage 1, Andrey Solomennikov
Stage 2, Sergey Firsanov

Coppa della Pace, Andrey Solomennikov
Overall Okolo Slovenska, Nikita Novikov

Stages 2 & 8, Nikita Novikov

Overall Tour des Pays de Savoie, Nikita Novikov

Prologue, Nikita Novikov
Stage 1, Pavel Kochetkov

Stage 4 Tour Alsace, Alexey Tsatevich
Stage 2 Giro della Valle d'Aosta, Nikita Novikov
Memorial Davide Fardelli, Anton Vorobyev
Stage 1 Tour of Bulgaria, Pavel Kochetkov
Stages 4 & 8 Tour of Bulgaria, Timofey Kritsky
Stage 5 Tour of Bulgaria, Dmitriy Kosyakov
Stage 7 Tour of Bulgaria, Alexey Tsatevich
2012
La Roue Tourangelle, Vyacheslav Kuznetsov
Grand Prix de la ville de Nogent-sur-Oise, Igor Boev
Stages 2 & 3 Grand Prix of Sochi, Sergei Rudaskov
Stage 3 Circuit des Ardennes, Team Time Trial
Overall Tour du Loir-et-Cher, Andrey Solomennikov

Stage 2, Igor Boev

Grand Prix of Donetsk, Ilnur Zakarin
Overall Grand Prix of Adygeya, Ilnur Zakarin

Stages 2 & 4, Ilnur Zakarin

Mayor Cup, Igor Boev
Memorial Oleg Dyachenko, Alexander Rybakov
Overall Five Rings of Moscow, Igor Boev

Stage 3, Igor Boev

Stage 2 Ronde de l'Isard, Sergey Chernetskiy
Stage 1 Ronde de l'Oise, Vyacheslav Kuznetsov
Stage 5 Girobio, Ilnur Zakarin
Stage 6 Giro della Valle d'Aosta, Sergey Chernetskiy
Stage 5 Tour Alsace, Ilnur Zakarin
Grand Prix des Marbriers, Sergey Pomoshnikov
Stage 6 Tour de l'Avenir, Sergey Pomoshnikov
Stage 1 Tour of Bulgaria, Sergey Pomoshnikov
Under-23 Time Trial World Championships, Anton Vorobyev
2013
Stages 2, 3 & 5 Grand Prix of Sochi, Maxim Razumov
Overall Five Rings of Moscow, Maxim Razumov
Stage 2 Okolo Slovenska, Sergey Nikolaev
Russia Under-23 Road Race Championships, Roman Katyrin
Stage 1 Tour Alsace, Maxim Pokidov
2014
Stage 4 Grand Prix of Adygeya, Alexander Foliforov
Prologue Five Rings of Moscow, Sergey Nikolaev
Stage 1 Five Rings of Moscow, Maxim Razumov
Stages 1 & 5 Ronde de l'Isard, Alexander Foliforov
Stages 2 & 3 Grand Prix Udmurtskaya Pravda, Sergey Nikolaev
Stages 1 & 4 (ITT) Tour des Pays de Savoie, Dmitriy Ignatiev
Central European Tour Szerencs–Ibrány, Mamyr Stash
Stage 2 Tour Alsace, Dmitriy Ignatiev
Stages 1 & 3 Tour of Kavkaz, Mamyr Stash
Stage 5 (ITT) Tour of Kavkaz, Dmitriy Ignatiev
2015
Stage 1 Istrian Spring Trophy, Sergey Nikolaev
Stage 1 Grand Prix of Sochi, Team time trial
Overall Tour of Kuban, Dmitry Samokhvalov

Prologue, Maxim Pokidov
Stage 2, Dmitry Samokhvalov

Stage 1 Grand Prix of Adygeya, Team time trial
Prologue Five Rings of Moscow, Sergey Nikolaev
Stage 3 Tour de Serbie, Sergey Pomoshnikov
