= Moscow Stars =

Team information
- UCI code: MST
- Registered: Russia
- Founded: 2005
- Disbanded: 2007
- Discipline: Road
- Status: UCI Continental

Key personnel
- General manager: Natalya Shvankova

Team name history
- 2005–2006 2007: Omnibike Dynamo Moscow; Moscow Stars

Moscow Stars was a Russian UCI Continental cycling team.
