= Grand Prix of Adygeya =

Russian multi-day road cycling race

Race details
- Region: Adygea
- Discipline: Road
- Competition: UCI Europe Tour 2.2
- Type: Stage race

History
- First edition: 2010
- Editions: 6
- Final edition: 2015
- First winner: Vitaly Popkov (UKR)
- Most wins: Ilnur Zakarin (RUS) (2 wins)
- Final winner: Sergey Firsanov (RUS)

Grand Prix of Adygeya was a cycling race held between 2010 and 2015 in Russia, and was held as part of the UCI Europe Tour in category 2.2.

== Winners ==
| Year | Country | Rider | Team |
|---|---|---|---|
| 2010 | Ukraine | Vitaly Popkov | ISD Continental Team |
| 2011 | Russia | Kirill Sinitsyn | |
| 2012 | Russia | Ilnur Zakarin | Itera–Katusha |
| 2013 | Ukraine | Andriy Khripta | Kolss Cycling Team |
| 2014 | Russia | Ilnur Zakarin | RusVelo |
| 2015 | Russia | Sergey Firsanov | RusVelo |
