= Moscow Cup =

Russian one-day road cycling race

Race details
- Date: May
- Region: Moscow
- Discipline: Road
- Competition: UCI Europe Tour
- Type: One day race

History
- First edition: 2005
- Editions: 11
- Final edition: 2015
- First winner: Ivan Terenine (RUS)
- Most wins: No repeat winners
- Final winner: Sergiy Lagkuti (UKR)

The Moscow Cup was a one-day cycling race that was held annually in Russia between 2005 and 2015. It was part of the UCI Europe Tour in category 1.2, and was known as the Mayor Cup until 2014.

== Winners ==
Year	Country	Rider	Team
2005	Russia	Ivan Terenine	
2006	Latvia	Normunds Lasis	Rietumu Banka–Riga
2007	Russia	Denis Galimzyanov	Premier
2008	Russia	Timofey Kritsky	Katyusha
2009	Russia	Mikhail Antonov	Katyusha Continental Team
2010	Serbia	Žolt Dér	Partizan Srbija
2011	Serbia	Ivan Stević	Partizan Powermove
2012	Russia	Igor Boev	Itera–Katusha
2013	Ukraine	Vitaliy Buts	Kolss Cycling Team
2014	Russia	Sergey Lagutin	RusVelo
2015	Ukraine	Sergiy Lagkuti	Kolss BDC Team
