= Andrei Stepanov (cyclist) =

Russian cyclist

Personal information
- Born: 19 April 1999 (age 27)

Cycling career
- Sport: Cycling
- Current team: Wheeltop Rotor Chengdu Team
- Discipline: Road
- Role: Rider

Amateur teams
- 2018–2019: Moscow Region
- 2020: Gazprom–RusVelo U23
- 2021–: Tyumen Region

Professional teams
- 2023: Yunnan Lvshan Landscape
- 2024–: Chengdu Cycling Team

Major wins
- One-day races and Classics Russian National Road Race Champion (2023)

Andrei Stepanov (born 18 April 1999) is a Russian cyclist.

== Career ==
He was selected to compete in the time trial at the 2020 UCI Road World Championships. In 2023 Stepanov finished third in the first stage of the Trans-Himalaya Cycling Race but was subsequently disqualified.

== Major results ==
2019
1st Time trial, National Under-23 Road Championships
1st Stage 7 Friendship People North-Caucasus Stage Race
10th Overall Five Rings of Moscow
2021
National Under-23 Road Championships

1st Time trial
2nd Road race

1st Stage 2 Samara Stage Race
2022
1st Overall Five Rings of Moscow
7th Overall Grand Prix of Sochi
2023 (1 Pro win)
1st Road race, National Road Championships
1st Overall Tour of Tea Horse Road

1st Stage 8

4th Yantian 100 Classic
6th Overall Tour of Yellow River (Dongying)
2024
1st Stage 1 TTT Chengdu Tianfu Greenway
1st Stage 1 TTT Tour of Poyang Lake
3rd Overall Tour of Taiyuan
4th Overall Trans-Himalaya Cycling Race
4th Overall Tour of Zhaotong
6th Overall Tour of Huangshan
