= 2027 UCI Asia Tour =

Sports season

- Twenty-third edition of the UCI Asia Tour

Details
- Dates: 8 November 2026 – 11 October 2027
- Location: Asia
- Races: 20

The 2027 UCI Asia Tour will be the 23nd season of the UCI Asia Tour. The season is scheduled to begin on 8 November 2026 with the Tour de Okinawa and will end in 11 October 2027 with the final stage of Tour de Kyushu.

New races in 2027 calendar includes Guangzhou International Road Cycling Race and Grand Prix Navoi. There are also races in 2026 not returning to the 2027 season. As the season progresses, races may be added to the calendar, changed dates or removed from the calendar.

Throughout the season, points are awarded to the top finishers of stages within stage races and the final general classification standings of each of the stages races and one-day events. The quality and complexity of a race also determines how many points are awarded to the top finishers, the higher the UCI rating of a race, the more points are awarded.

The UCI race classifications from highest to lowest are as follows:

- Multi-day events: 2.1 and 2.2
- One-day events: 1.1 and 1.2

== Events ==
Races in the 2026 UCI Asia Tour
| Race | Rating | Date | Winner | Team | Ref |
|---|---|---|---|---|---|
| (Japan) Tour de Okinawa | 1.2 | 8 November 2026 | Giacomo Garavaglia (ITA) | Swatt Club | |
| (India) Pune Grand Tour | 2.1 | 26–31 January 2027 | | | |
| (Chinese Taipei) Tour de Taiwan | 2.1 | 14–18 March 2027 | | | |
| (China) Guangzhou International Road Cycling Race | 2.2 | 19–21 March 2027 | | | |
| (Uzbekistan) Grand Prix Fergana | 2.2 | 8–9 April 2027 | | | |
| (Uzbekistan) Tour of Bostonliq | 2.2 | 14–15 April 2027 | | | |
| (Japan) Tour de Kumano | 2.2 | 6–9 May 2027 | | | |
| (China) Yellow River Estuary Road Cycling Race | 1.2 | 15 May 2027 | | | |
| Tour of Japan | 2.2 | 16–23 May 2027 | | | |
| (South Korea) Tour de Gyeongnam | 2.2 | 1–5 June 2027 | | | |
| Tour of Thailand | 2.1 | 28 June–3 July 2027 | | | |
| (China) Trans-Himalaya Cycling Race | 2.1 | 2–6 August 2027 | | | |
| (China) Tour of Shanghai | 2.2 | 3–5 September 2027 | | | |
| (China) Tour of Binzhou | 1.1 | 9 September 2027 | | | |
| (China) Tour of Taihu Lake | 2.1 | 11–15 September 2027 | | | |
| (China) Tour of Huangshan | 2.1 | 17–29 September 2027 | | | |
| (Japan) Oita Urban Classic Road Race | 1.2 | 26 September 2027 | | | |
| (Uzbekistan) Grand Prix Navoi | 2.2 | 29-30 September 2027 | | | |
| (Uzbekistan) Grand Prix Jizzakh | 2.2 | 6-7 October 2027 | | | |
| (Japan) Tour de Kyushu | 2.1 | 9–11 October 2027 | | | |
| Hong Kong Cyclothon | 1.1 | 10 October 2027 | | | |
