= Gazprom–RusVelo =

Russian cycling team

Team information
- UCI code: GAZ
- Registered: Russia
- Founded: 2012
- Discipline: Road
- Status: UCI Professional Continental (2012–2019); UCI ProTeam (2020–2022)
- Bicycles: Look Cycles
- Website: Team home page

Key personnel
- General manager: Renat Khamidulin

Team name history
- 2012–2015 2016–: RusVelo; Gazprom–RusVelo
Gazprom–RusVelo jersey
Jersey

Gazprom–RusVelo (UCI team code: GAZ), a part of the Russian Global Cycling Project and sponsored by Gazprom, is a Russian road and track cycling team that suspended its activities in 2022. It was founded in late 2011 and granted UCI Professional Continental status. For its first season 2012 the team signed several ex-Team Katusha riders along with a few ones from Continental Team Itera–Katusha.

RusVelo initially included both men's and women's rosters. The directors are Viatcheslav Ekimov, Oleg Grishkin, Egon van Kessel from the Netherlands, and Australian Henk Vogels. The General Manager was Heiko Salzwedel.

In March 2022 the team's licence was revoked by the UCI following the 2022 Russian invasion of Ukraine. On the same day bicycle manufacturer Look, and wheel provider Corima, both announced the cancellation of their sponsorship of the team. Later that month, the team suspended its activities.

== Team history ==
In December 2012, RusVelo's request for a Professional Continental licence for the 2013 season was denied pending a review. The squad were ultimately awarded a Professional Continental licence on 9 January 2013.

== Doping ==
In 2013 the team endured a spate of doping positives. In March Valery Kaikov for the, cancer-causing, banned compound GW501516 (Endurobol). This was the first recorded positive for Endurobol. In June at the 2013 Russian National Championships Roman Maikin and Artem Ovechkin tested positive for Fenoterol and received a six-month ban Andrey Solomennikov tested positive for asthma medication and received a six-month suspension as well. As a result, the team auto-suspended itself from competition. In June 2015, the team received their fifth positive in less than two years when Petr Ignatenko tested positive for human growth hormone (hGH) in an out-of-competition test on April 8, this is only the second hGH positive since Patrick Sinkewitz returned an adverse analytical finding for the substance.

== Team roster ==
As of 8 February 2022.

Rider	Date of birth
José Manuel Díaz (ESP)	18 January 1995 (age 31)
Marco Canola (ITA)	26 December 1988 (age 37)
Giovanni Carboni (ITA)	31 August 1995 (age 31)
Nikolay Cherkasov (RUS)	26 September 1996 (age 29)
Sergey Chernetskiy (RUS)	9 April 1990 (age 36)
Nicola Conci (ITA)	5 January 1997 (age 29)
Alessandro Fedeli (ITA)	2 March 1996 (age 30)
Michael Kukrle (CZE)	17 November 1994 (age 31)
Eirik Lunder (NOR)	9 June 1999 (age 27)
Matteo Malucelli (ITA)	20 October 1993 (age 32)

Rider	Date of birth
Denis Nekrasov (RUS)	19 February 1997 (age 29)
Artem Nych (RUS)	21 March 1995 (age 31)
Andrea Piccolo (ITA)	23 March 2001 (age 25)
Petr Rikunov (RUS)	24 February 1997 (age 29)
Kevin Rivera (CRC)	28 June 1998 (age 28)
Ivan Rovny (RUS)	30 September 1987 (age 38)
Cristian Scaroni (ITA)	16 October 1997 (age 28)
Dmitry Strakhov (RUS)	17 May 1995 (age 31)
Mathias Vacek (CZE)	12 June 2002 (age 24)
Ilnur Zakarin (RUS)	15 September 1989 (age 37)

== National champions ==
2013
Russian National Time Trial, Ilnur Zakarin
2015
Russian National Time Trial, Artem Ovechkin
2017
Russian National Road Race, Alexander Porsev
2019
Russian National Road Race, Alexander Vlasov
2021
Russian National Road Race, Artem Nych
