= 2025 Tour of Hainan =

2025 UCI ProSeries

Race details
- Dates: 7–11 April 2025
- Stages: 5
- Distance: 854.64 km (531.05 mi)
- Winning time: 19h 28' 45"

Results
Jersey awarded to the overall winner	Winner	Kyrylo Tsarenko (UKR)	(Team Solution Tech–Vini Fantini)
	Second	Cristian Raileanu (ROM)	(Li-Ning Star)
	Third	Aaron Gate (NZL)	(XDS Astana Team)
Jersey awarded to the points classification winner	Points	Xabier Berasategi (ESP)	(Euskaltel–Euskadi)
Jersey awarded to the mountains classification winner	Mountains	Nils Sinschek (NED)	(Parkhotel Valkenburg)
	Team	(Spain) Burgos Burpellet BH	

The 2025 Tour of Hainan was a men's road cycling stage race that took place from 7 to 11 April 2025. It was the 16th edition of the Tour of Hainan, which was rated as a 2.Pro event on the 2025 UCI ProSeries calendar.

== Teams ==
One UCI WorldTeam, four UCI ProTeams and fifteen UCI Continental teams made up the twenty teams in the race.

UCI WorldTeams

- XDS Astana Team

UCI ProTeams

- Burgos Burpellet BH
- Euskaltel–Euskadi
- Team Polti VisitMalta
- Team Solution Tech–Vini Fantini

UCI Continental Teams

- Bodywrap LTwoo Cycling Team
- CCACHE x BODYWRAP
- Chengdu DYC Cycling Team
- China Anta–Mentech Cycling Team
- FNIX–SCOM–Hengxiang Cycling Team
- Huansheng–Vonoa–Taishan Sport Cycling Team
- Li-Ning Star
- Parkhotel Valkenburg
- Quick Pro Team
- Roojai Insurance
- Shenzhen Kung Cycling Team
- St George Continental Cycling Team
- Team Medellín–EPM
- Terengganu Cycling Team
- Wuzhishan SCOM MVMT Cycling Team

== Schedule ==
Stage characteristics and winners
Stage	Date	Route	Distance	Type	Stage winner
1	7 April	Qionghai to Qionghai	90.34 km (56.13 mi)	Flat stage	Matteo Malucelli (ITA)
2	8 April	Qionghai to Lingshui	178.1 km (110.7 mi)	Flat stage	Dušan Rajović (SRB)
3	9 April	Lingshui to Baoting	212.6 km (132.1 mi)	Hilly stage	Kyrylo Tsarenko (UKR)
4	10 April	Baoting to Dongfang	190.8 km (118.6 mi)	Hilly stage	Aaron Gate (NZL)
5	11 April	Changjiang to Sanya	182.8 km (113.6 mi)	Flat stage	Alexander Salby (DEN)
Total			854.64 km (531.05 mi)		

== Stages ==
=== Stage 1 ===
7 April 2025 – Qionghai to Qionghai, 90.34 km (56.13 mi)

Stage 1 Result
Rank	Rider	Team	Time
1	Matteo Malucelli (ITA)	XDS Astana Team	1h 51' 12"
2	Norman Vahtra (EST)	China Anta–Mentech Cycling Team	+ 0"
3	Alexander Salby (DEN)	Li-Ning Star	+ 0"
4	Martin Laas (EST)	Quick Pro Team	+ 0"
5	Álvaro José Hodeg (COL)	Team Medellín–EPM	+ 0"
6	Dušan Rajović (SRB)	Team Solution Tech–Vini Fantini	+ 0"
7	Jesper Rasch (NED)	Parkhotel Valkenburg	+ 0"
8	Cameron Scott (AUS)	CCACHE x BODYWRAP	+ 0"
9	Xabier Berasategi (ESP)	Euskaltel–Euskadi	+ 0"
10	Daniel Cavia (ESP)	Burgos Burpellet BH	+ 0"

General classification after Stage 1
Rank	Rider	Team	Time
1	Matteo Malucelli (ITA)	XDS Astana Team	1h 51' 02"
2	Norman Vahtra (EST)	China Anta–Mentech Cycling Team	+ 4"
3	Alexander Salby (DEN)	Li-Ning Star	+ 6"
4	Eduard-Michael Grosu (ROM)	Huansheng–Vonoa–Taishan Sport Cycling Team	+ 7"
5	Henok Mulubrhan (ERI)	XDS Astana Team	+ 8"
6	Yevgeniy Gidich (KAZ)	China Anta–Mentech Cycling Team	+ 9"
7	Martin Laas (EST)	Quick Pro Team	+ 10"
8	Álvaro José Hodeg (COL)	Team Medellín–EPM	+ 10"
9	Dušan Rajović (SRB)	Team Solution Tech–Vini Fantini	+ 10"
10	Jesper Rasch (NED)	Parkhotel Valkenburg	+ 10"

=== Stage 2 ===
8 April 2025 – Qionghai to Lingshui, 178.1 km (110.7 mi)

Stage 2 Result
Rank	Rider	Team	Time
1	Dušan Rajović (SRB)	Team Solution Tech–Vini Fantini	3h 55' 46"
2	Luis Carlos Chía (COL)	Huansheng–Vonoa–Taishan Sport Cycling Team	+ 0"
3	Norman Vahtra (EST)	China Anta–Mentech Cycling Team	+ 0"
4	Matteo Malucelli (ITA)	XDS Astana Team	+ 0"
5	Cameron Scott (AUS)	CCACHE x BODYWRAP	+ 0"
6	Lev Gonov	XDS Astana Team	+ 0"
7	Manuel Peñalver (ESP)	Team Polti VisitMalta	+ 0"
8	Wan Abdul Rahman Hamdan (MAS)	Terengganu Cycling Team	+ 0"
9	Martin Laas (EST)	Quick Pro Team	+ 0"
10	Daniel Cavia (ESP)	Burgos Burpellet BH	+ 0"

General classification after Stage 2
Rank	Rider	Team	Time
1	Norman Vahtra (EST)	China Anta–Mentech Cycling Team	5h 46' 48"
2	Matteo Malucelli (ITA)	XDS Astana Team	+ 0"
3	Dušan Rajović (SRB)	Team Solution Tech–Vini Fantini	+ 0"
4	Luis Carlos Chía (COL)	Huansheng–Vonoa–Taishan Sport Cycling Team	+ 4"
5	Alexander Salby (DEN)	Li-Ning Star	+ 5"
6	Eduard-Michael Grosu (ROM)	Huansheng–Vonoa–Taishan Sport Cycling Team	+ 7"
7	Wilmar Paredes (COL)	Team Medellín–EPM	+ 7"
8	Cyrus Monk (AUS)	FNIX–SCOM–Hengxiang Cycling Team	+ 10"
9	Andoni López de Abetxuko (ESP)	Euskaltel–Euskadi	+ 8"
10	Henok Mulubrhan (ERI)	XDS Astana Team	+ 8"

=== Stage 3 ===
9 April 2025 – Lingshui to Baoting, 212.6 km (132.1 mi)

Stage 3 Result
Rank	Rider	Team	Time
1	Kyrylo Tsarenko (UKR)	Team Solution Tech–Vini Fantini	5h 14' 20"
2	Cristian Raileanu (ROM)	Li-Ning Star	+ 0"
3	Henok Mulubrhan (ERI)	XDS Astana Team	+ 47"
4	Daniel Cavia (ESP)	Burgos Burpellet BH	+ 47"
5	Luis Carlos Chía (COL)	Huansheng–Vonoa–Taishan Sport Cycling Team	+ 47"
6	Xabier Berasategi (ESP)	Euskaltel–Euskadi	+ 47"
7	Igor Chzhan (KAZ)	China Anta–Mentech Cycling Team	+ 47"
8	Aaron Gate (NZL)	XDS Astana Team	+ 47"
9	Francisco Muñoz (ESP)	Team Polti VisitMalta	+ 47"
10	Niek Voogt (NED)	Parkhotel Valkenburg	+ 47"

General classification after Stage 3
Rank	Rider	Team	Time
1	Kyrylo Tsarenko (UKR)	Team Solution Tech–Vini Fantini	11h 01' 08"
2	Cristian Raileanu (ROM)	Li-Ning Star	+ 4"
3	Nils Sinschek (NED)	Parkhotel Valkenburg	+ 50"
4	Henok Mulubrhan (ERI)	XDS Astana Team	+ 51"
5	Luis Carlos Chía (COL)	Huansheng–Vonoa–Taishan Sport Cycling Team	+ 51"
6	Óscar Sevilla (ESP)	Team Medellín–EPM	+ 52"
7	Wilmar Paredes (COL)	Team Medellín–EPM	+ 54"
8	Cyrus Monk (AUS)	FNIX–SCOM–Hengxiang Cycling Team	+ 54"
9	Josh Kench (NZL)	Li-Ning Star	+ 56"
10	Adne van Engelen (NED)	Terengganu Cycling Team	+ 56"

=== Stage 4 ===
10 April 2025 – Baoting to Dongfang, 190.8 km (118.6 mi)

Stage 4 Result
Rank	Rider	Team	Time
1	Aaron Gate (NZL)	XDS Astana Team	4h 09' 31"
2	Petr Rikunov	Chengdu DYC Cycling Team	+ 0"
3	Luis Carlos Chía (COL)	Huansheng–Vonoa–Taishan Sport Cycling Team	+ 3"
4	Timofei Ivanov	Chengdu DYC Cycling Team	+ 3"
5	Márton Dina (HUN)	Euskaltel–Euskadi	+ 3"
6	Diego Pablo Sevilla (ESP)	Team Polti VisitMalta	+ 3"
7	Xabier Berasategi (ESP)	Euskaltel–Euskadi	+ 3"
8	Wilmar Paredes (COL)	Team Medellín–EPM	+ 3"
9	Carter Bettles (AUS)	Roojai Insurance	+ 3"
10	Liam Walsh (AUS)	CCACHE x BODYWRAP	+ 3"

General classification after Stage 4
Rank	Rider	Team	Time
1	Kyrylo Tsarenko (UKR)	Team Solution Tech–Vini Fantini	15h 10' 42"
2	Cristian Raileanu (ROM)	Li-Ning Star	+ 4"
3	Aaron Gate (NZL)	XDS Astana Team	+ 41"
4	Luis Carlos Chía (COL)	Huansheng–Vonoa–Taishan Sport Cycling Team	+ 47"
5	Petr Rikunov	Chengdu DYC Cycling Team	+ 48"
6	Henok Mulubrhan (ERI)	XDS Astana Team	+ 49"
7	Nils Sinschek (NED)	Parkhotel Valkenburg	+ 50"
8	Óscar Sevilla (ESP)	Team Medellín–EPM	+ 52"
9	Xabier Berasategi (ESP)	Euskaltel–Euskadi	+ 53"
10	Cyrus Monk (AUS)	FNIX–SCOM–Hengxiang Cycling Team	+ 53"

=== Stage 5 ===
11 April 2025 – Changjiang to Sanya, 182.8 km (113.6 mi)

Stage 5 Result
Rank	Rider	Team	Time
1	Alexander Salby (DEN)	Li-Ning Star	4h 18' 03"
2	Manuel Peñalver (ESP)	Team Polti VisitMalta	+ 0"
3	Matteo Malucelli (ITA)	XDS Astana Team	+ 0"
4	Aaron Gate (NZL)	XDS Astana Team	+ 0"
5	Norman Vahtra (EST)	China Anta–Mentech Cycling Team	+ 0"
6	Xabier Berasategi (ESP)	Euskaltel–Euskadi	+ 0"
7	Álvaro José Hodeg (COL)	Team Medellín–EPM	+ 0"
8	Luis Carlos Chía (COL)	Huansheng–Vonoa–Taishan Sport Cycling Team	+ 0"
9	Tom Sexton (NZL)	St George Continental Cycling Team	+ 0"
10	Igor Chzhan (KAZ)	China Anta–Mentech Cycling Team	+ 0"

General classification after Stage 5
Rank	Rider	Team	Time
1	Kyrylo Tsarenko (UKR)	Team Solution Tech–Vini Fantini	19h 28' 45"
2	Cristian Raileanu (ROM)	Li-Ning Star	+ 4"
3	Aaron Gate (NZL)	XDS Astana Team	+ 40"
4	Henok Mulubrhan (ERI)	XDS Astana Team	+ 46"
5	Luis Carlos Chía (COL)	Huansheng–Vonoa–Taishan Sport Cycling Team	+ 47"
6	Petr Rikunov	Chengdu DYC Cycling Team	+ 48"
7	Cyrus Monk (AUS)	FNIX–SCOM–Hengxiang Cycling Team	+ 50"
8	Nils Sinschek (NED)	Parkhotel Valkenburg	+ 50"
9	Xabier Berasategi (ESP)	Euskaltel–Euskadi	+ 51"
10	Óscar Sevilla (ESP)	Team Medellín–EPM	+ 52"

== Classification leadership table ==
Classification leadership by stage
Stage	Winner	General classification	Points classification	Mountains classification	Team classification
1	Matteo Malucelli	Matteo Malucelli	Matteo Malucelli	Kane Richards	CCACHE x BODYWRAP
2	Dušan Rajović	Norman Vahtra	Matteo Malucelli	Adne van Engelen	XDS Astana Team
3	Kyrylo Tsarenko	Kyrylo Tsarenko	Matteo Malucelli	Nils Sinschek	Burgos Burpellet BH
4	Aaron Gate	Kyrylo Tsarenko	Luis Carlos Chía	Nils Sinschek	Burgos Burpellet BH
5	Alexander Salby	Kyrylo Tsarenko	Xabier Berasategi	Nils Sinschek	Burgos Burpellet BH
Final		Kyrylo Tsarenko	Xabier Berasategi	Nils Sinscheck	Burgos Burpellet BH

== Classification standings ==
Legend
Denotes the winner of the general classification
Denotes the winner of the points classification
Denotes the winner of the mountains classification

=== General classification ===
Final general classification (1–10)
Rank	Rider	Team	Time
1	Kyrylo Tsarenko (UKR)	Team Solution Tech–Vini Fantini	19h 28' 45"
2	Cristian Raileanu (ROM)	Li-Ning Star	+ 4"
3	Aaron Gate (NZL)	XDS Astana Team	+ 40"
4	Henok Mulubrhan (ERI)	XDS Astana Team	+ 46"
5	Luis Carlos Chía (COL)	Huansheng–Vonoa–Taishan Sport Cycling Team	+ 47"
6	Petr Rikunov	Chengdu DYC Cycling Team	+ 48"
7	Cyrus Monk (AUS)	FNIX–SCOM–Hengxiang Cycling Team	+ 50"
8	Nils Sinschek (NED)	Parkhotel Valkenburg	+ 50"
9	Xabier Berasategi (ESP)	Euskaltel–Euskadi	+ 51"
10	Óscar Sevilla (ESP)	Team Medellín–EPM	+ 52"

=== Points classification ===
Final points classification (1–10)
Rank	Rider	Team	Points
1	Xabier Berasategi (ESP)	Euskaltel–Euskadi	49
2	Luis Carlos Chía (COL)	Huansheng–Vonoa–Taishan Sport Cycling Team	46
3	Aaron Gate (NZL)	XDS Astana Team	45
4	Matteo Malucelli (ITA)	XDS Astana Team	42
5	Norman Vahtra (EST)	China Anta–Mentech Cycling Team	38
6	Alexander Salby (DEN)	Li-Ning Star	32
7	Henok Mulubrhan (ERI)	XDS Astana Team	29
8	Daniel Cavia (ESP)	Burgos Burpellet BH	28
9	Manuel Peñalver (ESP)	Team Polti VisitMalta	28
10	Dušan Rajović (SRB)	Team Solution Tech–Vini Fantini	27

=== Mountains classification ===
Final mountains classification (1–10)
Rank	Rider	Team	Points
1	Nils Sinschek (NED)	Parkhotel Valkenburg	40
2	Óscar Sevilla (ESP)	Team Medellín–EPM	35
3	Adne van Engelen (NED)	Terengganu Cycling Team	18
4	Josh Kench (NZL)	Li-Ning Star	12
5	Jon Agirre (ESP)	Euskaltel–Euskadi	12
6	Žiga Horvat (SLO)	FNIX–SCOM–Hengxiang Cycling Team	7
7	Wilmar Paredes (COL)	Team Medellín–EPM	5
8	Germán Darío Gómez (COL)	Team Polti VisitMalta	5
9	Kane Richards (AUS)	Roojai Insurance	3
10	Cyrus Monk (AUS)	FNIX–SCOM–Hengxiang Cycling Team	3

=== Team classification ===
Final team classification (1–10)
Rank	Team	Time
1	(Spain) Burgos Burpellet BH	58h 29' 06"
2	(Italy) Team Polti VisitMalta	+ 0"
3	(Spain) Euskaltel–Euskadi	+ 0"
4	(Netherlands) Parkhotel Valkenburg	+ 0"
5	(Colombia) Team Medellín–EPM	+ 0"
6	(Thailand) Roojai Insurance	+ 0"
7	(Malaysia) Terengganu Cycling Team	+ 0"
8	China Anta–Mentech Cycling Team	+ 1"
9	(China) FNIX–SCOM–Hengxiang Cycling Team	+ 1"
10	(Kazakhstan) XDS Astana Team	+ 9' 01"
