= Russian National Time Trial Championships =

National road cycling championship in Russia

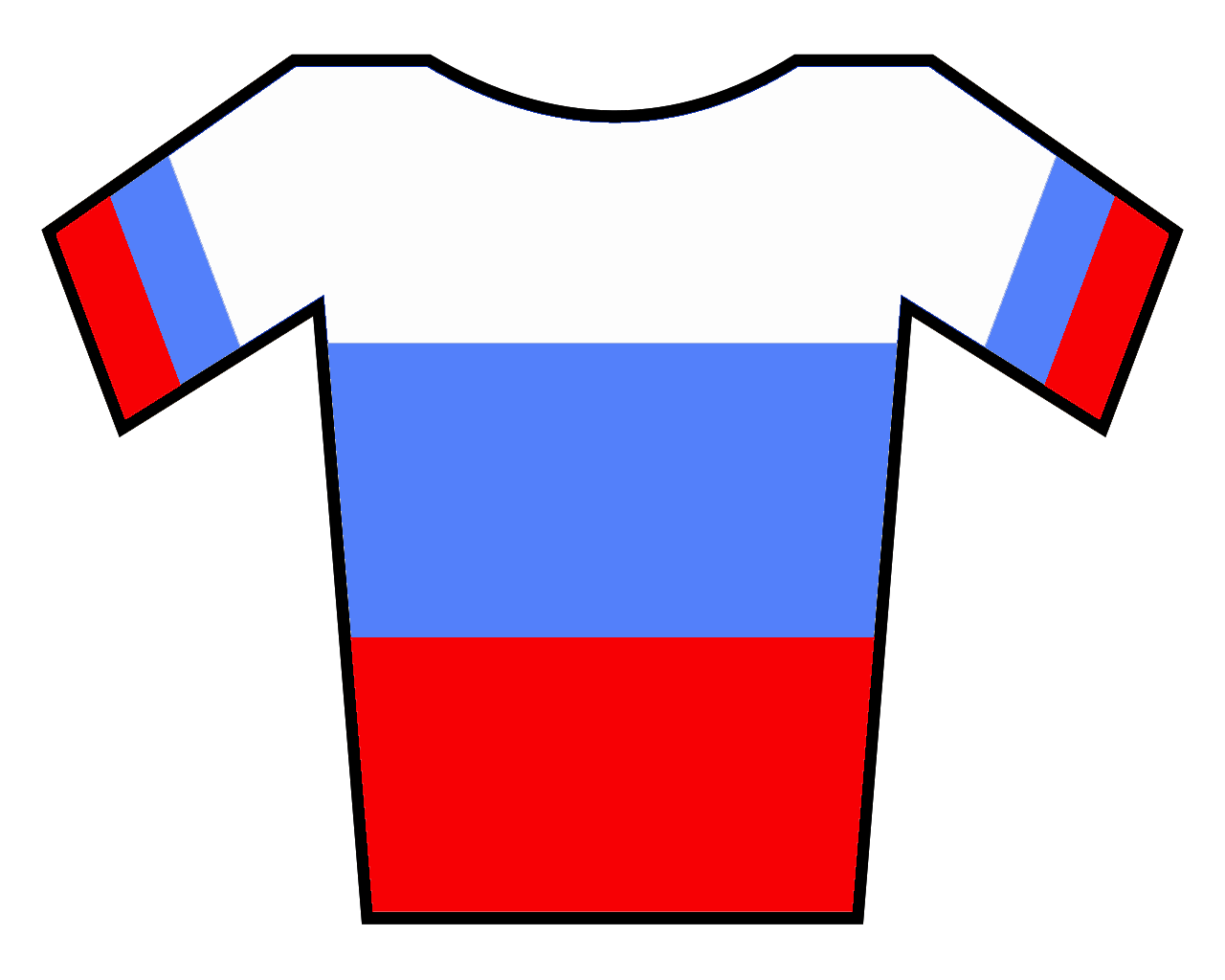
The champions jersey

The Russian National Time Trial Championships are an annual cycling race which decides the Russian cycling champion in the time trial discipline for several categories of rider. Artem Ovechkin holds the men's record of most victories with 5, while the women's record is held by Zulfiya Zabirova and Tatiana Antoshina with six victories. The current champions are Alexander Evtushenko and Tamara Dronova.

== Multiple winners ==
Men

Name	Wins	Years
Artem Ovechkin	5	2009, 2015, 2018, 2019, 2020
Vladimir Gusev	4	2003, 2007, 2008, 2010
Evgeni Petrov	2	2000, 2002
Alexander Bespalov	2	2004, 2006
Ilnur Zakarin	2	2013, 2017

Women

Name	Wins	Years
Zulfiya Zabirova	6	1996, 1997, 1998, 1999, 2000, 2002
Tatiana Antoshina	6	2007, 2009, 2010, 2013, 2014, 2015
Svetlana Bubnenkova	3	1994, 2003, 2005
Olga Sliussareva	3	2001, 2004, 2006
Tamara Dronova	3	2021, 2022, 2023

== Men ==
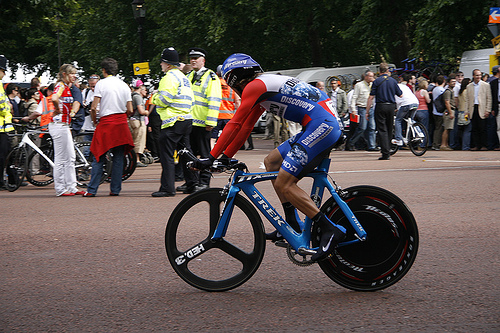
Vladimir Gusev

=== Elite ===
Year	Gold	Silver	Bronze
1998	Oleg Zhukov	Alexei Sivakov	Eduard Gritsun
1999	Sergei Startchenkov	Dmitri Semov	Konstantin Gradusov
2000	Evgeni Petrov	Oleg Zhukov	Denis Menchov
2001	Dmitri Semov	Denis Bondarenko	Andrei Zintchenko
2002	Evgeni Petrov	Dmitri Semov	Vladimir Karpets
2003	Vladimir Gusev	Alexander Bespalov	Vladislav Borisov
2004	Alexander Bespalov	Oleg Zhukov	Dmitri Semov
2005	Maxim Belkov	Vladimir Gusev	Alexander Bespalov
2006	Alexander Bespalov	Stanislav Belov	Maxim Belkov
2007	Vladimir Gusev	Evgeni Petrov	Alexander Bespalov
2008	Vladimir Gusev	Timofey Kritsky	Vladimir Karpets
2009	Artem Ovechkin	Mikhail Ignatiev	Maxim Belkov
2010	Vladimir Gusev	Mikhail Ignatiev	Alexander Arekeev
2011	Mikhail Ignatiev	Vladimir Karpets	Dmitri Sokolov
2012	Denis Menchov	Dmitri Sokolov	Valery Kaykov
2013	Ilnur Zakarin	Vladimir Gusev	Artem Ovechkin
2014	Anton Vorobyev	Sergey Chernetskiy	Artem Ovechkin
2015	Artem Ovechkin	Sergey Nikolaev	Pavel Brutt
2016	Sergey Chernetskiy	Pavel Brutt	Maxim Belkov
2017	Ilnur Zakarin	Maxim Belkov	Anton Vorobyev
2018	Artem Ovechkin	Pavel Sivakov	Alexander Porsev
2019	Artem Ovechkin	Anton Vorobyev	Artem Nych
2020	Artem Ovechkin	Sergey Shilov	Viktor Manakov
2021	Aleksandr Vlasov	Artem Ovechkin	Vladislav Duyunov
2022	Alexander Evtushenko	Petr Rikunov	Viktor Manakov
2023	Petr Rikunov	Lev Gonov	Dmitry Razanov

=== U23 ===
Year	Gold	Silver	Bronze
2011	Anton Vorobyev	Artur Ershov	Maxim Pokidov
2012	Anton Vorobyev	Konstantin Kuperasov	Mikhail Akimov
2013	Alexander Evtushenko	Viktor Manakov	Evgeny Zverkov
2014	Alexander Evtushenko	Roman Kustadinchev	Kirill Yatsevich
2015	Alexander Evtushenko	Ivan Lutsenko	Nikolay Cherkasov
2016	Vladislav Duyunov	Pavel Sayko	Artem Romanenko
2017	Petr Rikunov	Nikolay Cherkasov	Stepan Kurianov
2018	Petr Rikunov	Vladislav Kulikov	Aleksandr Vlasov
2019	Andrei Stepanov	Evgenii Kazanov	Mikhail Fokin
2020	Lev Gonov	Gleb Syritsa	Evgenii Kazanov
2021	Konstantin Nekrasov	Andrei Stepanov	Sergey Belyakov
2022	Kirill Kapustin	Aleksandr Bereznyak	Artem Gomozkov

== Women ==
Year	Gold	Silver	Bronze
1993	Nadezhda Kibardina	Svetlana Bubnenkova	Valentina Gerasimova
1994	Svetlana Bubnenkova	Aleksandra Koliaseva	Valentina Gerasimova
1995	Valentina Polkhanova	Zulfiya Zabirova	Svetlana Bubnenkova
1996	Zulfiya Zabirova	Gulnara Ivanova-Fatkulina	Natalja Bubentchikova
1997	Zulfiya Zabirova	Valentina Polkhanova	Valentina Gerasimova
1998	Zulfiya Zabirova	Svetlana Samokhvalova	Valentina Gerasimova
1999	Zulfiya Zabirova	Valentina Gerasimova	Elena Tchalykh
2000	Zulfiya Zabirova	Olga Slyusareva	Valentina Gerasimova
2001	Olga Slyusareva	Elena Tchalykh	Svetlana Ivakhonenkova
2002	Zulfiya Zabirova	Olga Slyusareva	Svetlana Bubnenkova
2003	Svetlana Bubnenkova		
2004	Olga Slyusareva	Svetlana Bubnenkova	Natalia Boyarskaya
2005	Svetlana Bubnenkova	Olga Slyusareva	Tatiana Antoshina
2006	Olga Slyusareva	Svetlana Bubnenkova	Tatiana Antoshina
2007	Tatiana Antoshina	Alexandra Burchenkova	Yuliya Martisova
2008	Elena Tchalykh	Tatiana Antoshina	Natalia Boyarskaya
2009	Tatiana Antoshina	Alexandra Burchenkova	Svetlana Bubnenkova
2010	Tatiana Antoshina	Olga Zabelinskaya	Victoria Kondel
2011	Alexandra Burchenkova	Olga Zabelinskaya	Tatiana Antoshina
2012	Olga Zabelinskaya	Natalia Boyarskaya	Tatiana Antoshina
2013	Tatiana Antoshina	Kseniya Dobrynina	Alexandra Burchenkova
2014	Tatiana Antoshina	Kseniya Dobrynina	Irina Molycheva
2015	Tatiana Antoshina	Natalia Boyarskaya	Tamara Balabolina
2016	Natalia Boyarskaya	Anastasia Chursina	Svetlana Kuznetsova
2017	Kseniia Tsymbalyuk	Anastasiia Pliaskina	Margarita Syradoeva
2018	Olga Zabelinskaya	Kseniia Tsymbalyuk	Maria Novolodskaya
2019	Anastasiia Pliaskina	Elizaveta Oshurkova	Kseniya Dobrynina
2020	Elizaveta Oshurkova	Maria Novolodskaya	Tamara Balabolina
2021	Tamara Dronova	Natalia Studenikina	Tatiana Antoshina
2022	Tamara Dronova	Tatiana Antoshina	Diana Klimova
2023	Tamara Dronova	Daria Buneeva	Maria Novolodskaya
