= Anton Vorobyev =

Russian cyclist (born 1990)

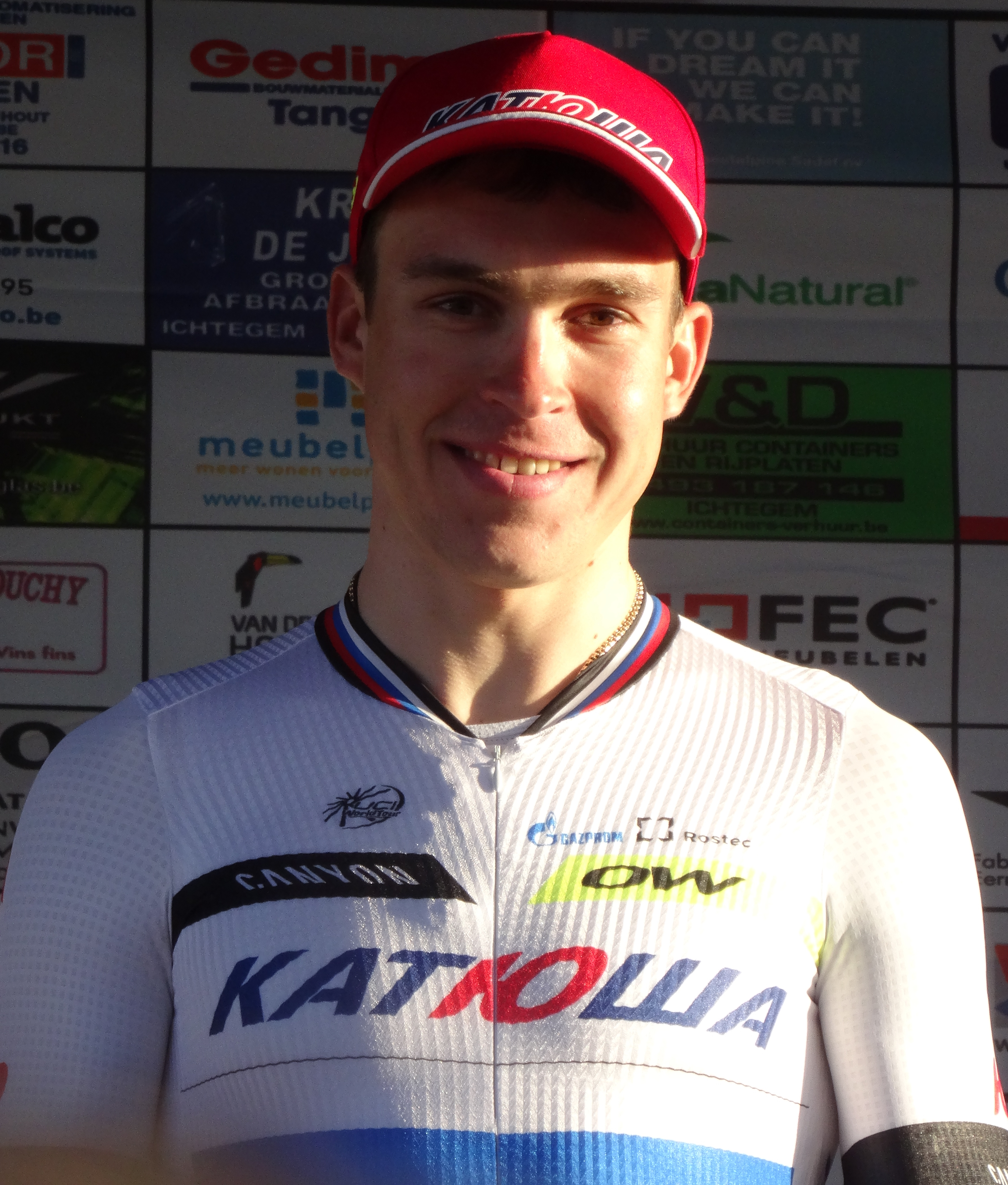
- Vorobyev at the 2015 Driedaagse van West-Vlaanderen

Personal information
- Full name: Anton Gennadyevich Vorobyev; Антон Геннадьевич Воробьёв
- Born: 12 October 1990 (age 36) Dmitrov, Soviet Union
- Height: 1.80 m (5 ft 11 in)
- Weight: 74 kg (163 lb)

Cycling career
- Sport: Cycling
- Discipline: Road
- Role: Rider
- Rider type: Time trialist

Amateur teams
- 2010–2012: Itera–Katusha
- 2012: Team Katusha (stagiaire)
- 2018: Moscow Region

Professional teams
- 2013–2016: Team Katusha
- 2017: Gazprom–RusVelo
- 2019: Gazprom–RusVelo

Major wins
- One-day races and Classics National Time Trial Championships (2014)
Medal record
Military World Games
Gold medal – first place	2019 Wuhan	Individual time trial

Anton Gennadyevich Vorobyev (Russian: Антон Геннадьевич Воробьёв; born 12 October 1990) is a Russian cyclist, who last rode for UCI Professional Continental team Gazprom–RusVelo. In 2012, he became the World Under-23 time trial champion on a hilly course.

== Major results ==
2008
5th Overall Trofeo Karlsberg
6th Time trial, UCI Juniors World Championships
2010
Polska–Ukraina

1st Stages 3 & 4

3rd Grand Prix of Moscow
5th Duo Normand (with Vyacheslav Kuznetsov)
7th Textielprijs
8th Chrono Champenois
2011
1st Time trial, National Under-23 Road Championships
1st Memorial Davide Fardelli
3rd Chrono Champenois
4th Time trial, UCI Under-23 Road World Championships
2012
1st Time trial, UCI Under-23 Road World Championships
National Under-23 Road Championships

1st Time trial
1st Road race

3rd Memorial Davide Fardelli
4th Time trial, UEC European Under-23 Road Championships
4th Duo Normand (with Sergey Chernetskiy)
2013
1st Stage 1b (TTT) Settimana Internazionale di Coppi e Bartali
2014
1st Time trial, National Road Championships
8th Time trial, UCI Road World Championships
2015
2nd Overall Driedaagse van West-Vlaanderen

1st Prologue

6th Time trial, European Games
10th Overall Tour de l'Eurométropole
2016
Circuit de la Sarthe

1st Points classification
1st Mountains classification
1st Stages 2b (ITT) & 3

4th Time trial, National Road Championships
10th Time trial, European Road Championships
2017
3rd Time trial, National Road Championships
2018
1st Prologue Five Rings of Moscow
3rd Time trial, National Road Championships
2019
2nd Time trial, National Road Championships
7th Time trial, European Games

=== Grand Tour general classification results timeline ===
Grand Tour	2015	2016
Giro d'Italia	DNF	100
Tour de France	—	—
Vuelta a España	—	—

Legend
—	Did not compete
DNF	Did not finish
