= 2012 UCI Road World Championships – Men's under-23 time trial =

Men's under-23 time trial
2012 UCI Road World Championships
- Rainbow jersey

Race details
- Dates: September 17, 2012
- Stages: 1
- Distance: 36.0 km (22.37 mi)
- Winning time: 44' 09.02"

Medalists
| | Gold | Anton Vorobyev (RUS) | (Russia) |
| | Silver | Rohan Dennis (AUS) | (Australia) |
| | Bronze | Damien Howson (AUS) | (Australia) |

The Men's under-23 time trial of the 2012 UCI Road World Championships cycling event took place on 17 September in and around Valkenburg, Netherlands.

Anton Vorobyev took Russia's first gold medal in the event, since Mikhail Ignatiev won in Madrid in 2005, denying Australia's Rohan Dennis and Damien Howson by 44.39 and 51.12 seconds respectively.

== Final classification ==
| Rank | Rider | Time |
|---|---|---|
| 1 | (Russia) Anton Vorobyev (RUS) | 44' 09.02" |
| 2 | (Australia) Rohan Dennis (AUS) | + 44.39" |
| 3 | (Australia) Damien Howson (AUS) | + 51.12" |
| 4 | (Denmark) Lasse Norman Hansen (DEN) | + 53.28" |
| 5 | (Denmark) Rasmus Quaade (DEN) | + 1' 02.56" |
| 6 | (Ukraine) Marlen Zmorka (UKR) | + 1' 09.42" |
| 7 | (Denmark) Rasmus Sterobo (DEN) | + 1' 25.24" |
| 8 | (Germany) Jasha Sütterlin (GER) | + 1' 28.70" |
| 9 | (Russia) Sergey Chernetski (RUS) | + 1' 37.95" |
| 10 | (Netherlands) Tom Dumoulin (NED) | + 1' 40.78" |
| 11 | (France) Johan Le Bon (FRA) | + 1' 50.26" |
| 12 | (Luxembourg) Bob Jungels (LUX) | + 1' 52.92" |
| 13 | (Canada) Hugo Houle (CAN) | + 1' 59.72" |
| 14 | (France) Yoann Paillot (FRA) | + 2' 12.09" |
| 15 | (Switzerland) Gabriel Chavanne (SUI) | + 2' 17.05" |
| 16 | (Belgium) Yves Lampaert (BEL) | + 2' 19.25" |
| 17 | (Ukraine) Oleksandr Golovash (UKR) | + 2' 26.80" |
| 18 | (Kazakhstan) Alexey Lutsenko (KAZ) | + 2' 31.61" |
| 19 | (Argentina) Eduardo Sepúlveda (ARG) | + 2' 40.89" |
| 20 | (United States) Nathan Brown (USA) | + 2' 41.60" |
| 21 | (Netherlands) Jasper Hamelink (NED) | + 2' 41.94" |
| 22 | (Kazakhstan) Daniil Fominykh (KAZ) | + 2' 45.30" |
| 23 | (Austria) Patrick Konrad (AUT) | + 2' 46.09" |
| 24 | (Germany) Jakob Steigmiller (GER) | + 2' 48.80" |
| 25 | (Ethiopia) Tsgabu Grmay (ETH) | + 2' 49.91" |
| 26 | (Belgium) Kevin De Jonghe (BEL) | + 3' 00.44" |
| 27 | (United States) Lawrence Warbasse (USA) | + 3' 08.34" |
| 28 | (Switzerland) Silvan Dillier (SUI) | + 3' 09.08" |
| 29 | (United Kingdom) Joseph Perrett (GBR) | + 3' 09.30" |
| 30 | (Republic of Ireland) Sean Downey (IRL) | + 3' 10.86" |
| 31 | (Czech Republic) Daniel Turek (CZE) | + 3' 16.71" |
| 32 | (Sweden) Tobias Ludvigsson (SWE) | + 3' 26.91" |
| 33 | (Austria) Andreas Hofer (AUT) | + 3' 28.71" |
| 34 | (Spain) Omar Fraile (ESP) | + 3' 29.74" |
| 35 | (Colombia) Hernando Bohórquez (COL) | + 3' 35.15" |
| 36 | (South Africa) Louis Meintjes (RSA) | + 3' 42.48" |
| 37 | (New Zealand) James Oram (NZL) | + 3' 43.95" |
| 38 | (Italy) Davide Martinelli (ITA) | + 3' 50.26" |
| 39 | (United Kingdom) Samuel Harrison (GBR) | + 4' 07.29" |
| 40 | (Slovenia) Klemen Štimulak (SLO) | + 4' 12.79" |
| 41 | (Canada) David Boily (CAN) | + 4' 16.33" |
| 42 | (Belarus) Andrei Holubeu (BLR) | + 4' 23.48" |
| 43 | (Spain) Marcos Jurado (ESP) | + 4' 25.85" |
| 44 | (Slovenia) Mark Dzamastagic (SLO) | + 4' 29.31" |
| 45 | (New Zealand) Jason Christie (NZL) | + 4' 36.73" |
| 46 | (Morocco) Soufiane Haddi (MAR) | + 4' 41.75" |
| 47 | (Luxembourg) Alex Kirsch (LUX) | + 4' 42.42" |
| 48 | (Republic of Ireland) Conor Dunne (IRL) | + 4' 46.77" |
| 49 | (Italy) Mattia Cattaneo (ITA) | + 4' 51.15" |
| 50 | (Namibia) Till Drobisch (NAM) | + 5' 15.64" |
| 51 | (Ivory Coast) Issiaka Cissé (CIV) | + 5' 25.00" |
| 52 | (Azerbaijan) Tural Iskandarov (AZE) | + 5' 44.66" |
| 53 | (Belarus) Nikita Zharoven (BLR) | + 5' 55.50" |
| 54 | (Lithuania) Paulius Šiškevičius (LTU) | + 5' 57.04" |
| 55 | (Thailand) Sarawut Sirironnachai (THA) | + 6' 25.01" |
| 56 | (Netherlands Antilles) Quinten Winkel (AHO) | + 6' 39.49" |
| 57 | (Morocco) Reda Aadel (MAR) | + 6' 53.02" |
| 58 | (Ecuador) Carlos Quishpe (ECU) | + 6' 53.67" |
| 59 | (Bolivia) Piter Campero (BOL) | + 7' 01.77" |
| 60 | (Dominican Republic) Manuel Sánchez Cuevas (DOM) | + 7' 04.53" |
| 61 | (Netherlands Antilles) Hillard Cijntje (AHO) | + 7' 08.26" |
| 62 | (Slovakia) Johann Schwabik (SVK) | + 7' 12.94" |
| 63 | (Japan) Hiroshi Tsubaki (JPN) | + 7' 16.61" |
| 64 | (Moldova) Maxim Rusnac (MDA) | + 7' 29.65" |
| 65 | (Ecuador) Julio Paspuezan (ECU) | + 7' 50.10" |
| 66 | (Mexico) Ulises Alfredo Castillo (MEX) | + 8' 31.69" |
| 67 | (North Macedonia) Stefan Petrovski (MKD) | + 9' 08.71" |
| | (Panama) Ramón Carretero (PAN) | DNF |
