= Maxim Belkov =

Russian road cyclist

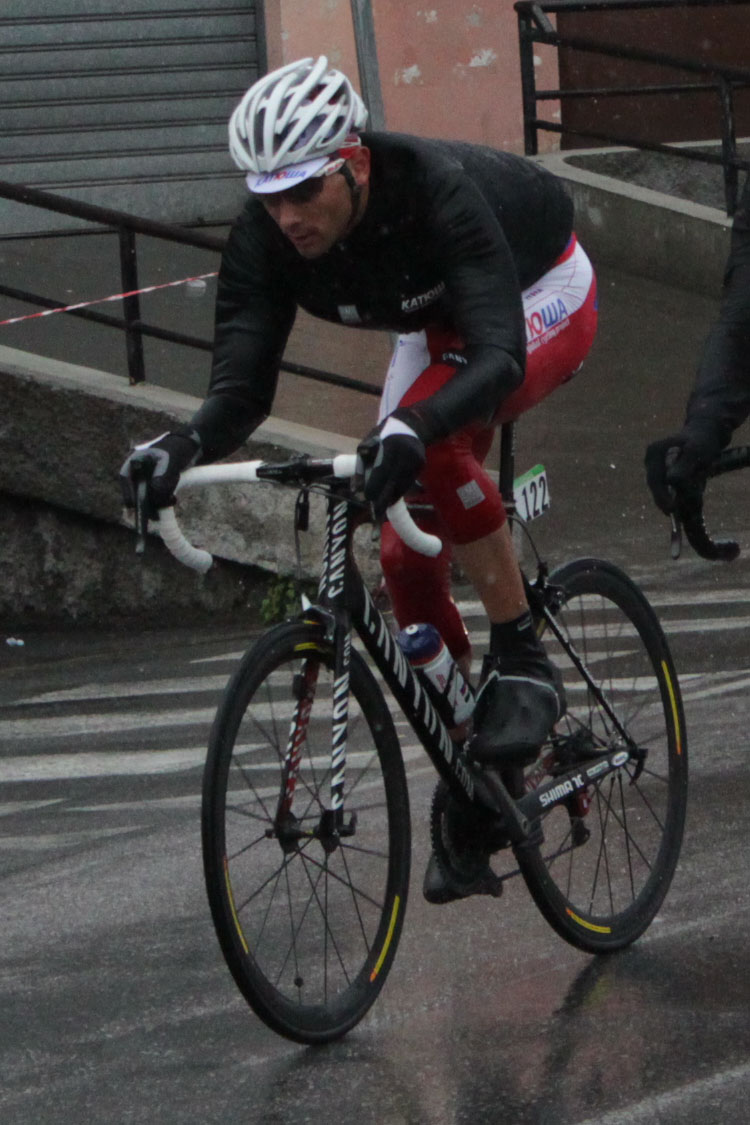
- Belkov at the 2013 Milan–San Remo

Personal information
- Full name: Maxim Igorevich Belkov
- Born: 9 January 1985 (age 41) Izhevsk, Soviet Union
- Height: 1.84 m (6 ft 1/2 in)
- Weight: 71 kg (157 lb)

Cycling career
- Sport: Cycling
- Current team: Retired
- Discipline: Road
- Role: Rider
- Rider type: All-rounder

Professional teams
- 2009–2010: ISD
- 2011: Vacansoleil–DCM
- 2012–2018: Team Katusha

Major wins
- Grand Tours Giro d'Italia 1 individual stage (2013)

Maxim Igorevich Belkov (Russian: Максим Игоревич Бельков; born 9 January 1985) is a Russian former professional road cyclist, who rode professionally between 2009 and 2018 for the ISD–NERI, Vacansoleil–DCM and Team Katusha–Alpecin squads.

== Major results ==
2004
2nd Overall Giro delle Regioni
7th Gran Premio Palio del Recioto
2005
1st Time trial, National Road Championships
UEC European Under-23 Road Championships

6th Road race
8th Time trial

2006
1st Road race, National Under-23 Road Championships
1st Trofeo Città di San Vendemiano
2nd Overall Giro delle Regioni
3rd Time trial, National Road Championships
7th Memorial Oleg Dyachenko
2007
1st Time trial, UEC European Under-23 Road Championships
8th Coppa San Geo
2008
8th Overall Giro della Valle d'Aosta
2009
1st Stage 1b (TTT) Settimana Internazionale di Coppi e Bartali
2nd Ringerike GP
3rd Time trial, National Road Championships
2010
1st Stage 1 (TTT) Brixia Tour
5th Overall Five Rings of Moscow
9th Overall Danmark Rundt
2012
1st Sprints classification Tour of Turkey
2013
1st Stage 9 Giro d'Italia
1st Stage 1b (TTT) Settimana Internazionale di Coppi e Bartali
1st Stage 3 (TTT) Tour des Fjords
10th Strade Bianche
2014
1st Mountains classification Tour of Austria
2015
Tour de Romandie

1st Sprints classification
1st Mountains classification

2016
National Road Championships

2nd Road race
3rd Time trial

2017
2nd Time trial, National Road Championships

=== Grand Tour general classification results timeline ===
Grand Tour	2011	2012	2013	2014	2015	2016	2017	2018
Giro d'Italia	101	—	DNF	90	102	116	125	127
Tour de France	Did not contest during career							
Vuelta a España	—	—	—	—	—	—	134	—

Legend
—	Did not compete
DNF	Did not finish
