= 2005 Tro-Bro Léon =

Race details
- Dates: 17 April 2005
- Stages: 1
- Distance: 192.2 km (119.4 mi)
- Winning time: 5h 02' 32"

Results
| | Winner | Tristan Valentin (FRA) |
| | Second | Cédric Coutouly (FRA) |
| | Third | Mikhail Timochine (RUS) |

The 2005 Tro-Bro Léon was the 22nd edition of the Tro-Bro Léon cycle race and was held on 17 April 2005. The race was won by Tristan Valentin.

== General classification ==
Final general classification

| Rank | Rider | Time |
|---|---|---|
| 1 | Tristan Valentin (FRA) | 5h 02' 32" |
| 2 | Cédric Coutouly (FRA) | + 30" |
| 3 | Mikhail Timochine (RUS) | + 30" |
| 4 | John Gadret (FRA) | + 32" |
| 5 | Charles Guilbert (FRA) | + 32" |
| 6 | Stéphane Pétilleau (FRA) | + 37" |
| 7 | Jans Koerts (NED) | + 40" |
| 8 | Linas Balčiūnas (LTU) | + 40" |
| 9 | Sébastien Hinault (FRA) | + 40" |
| 10 | Alexandre Usov (BLR) | + 40" |
