= Artem Nych =

Russian bicycle racer

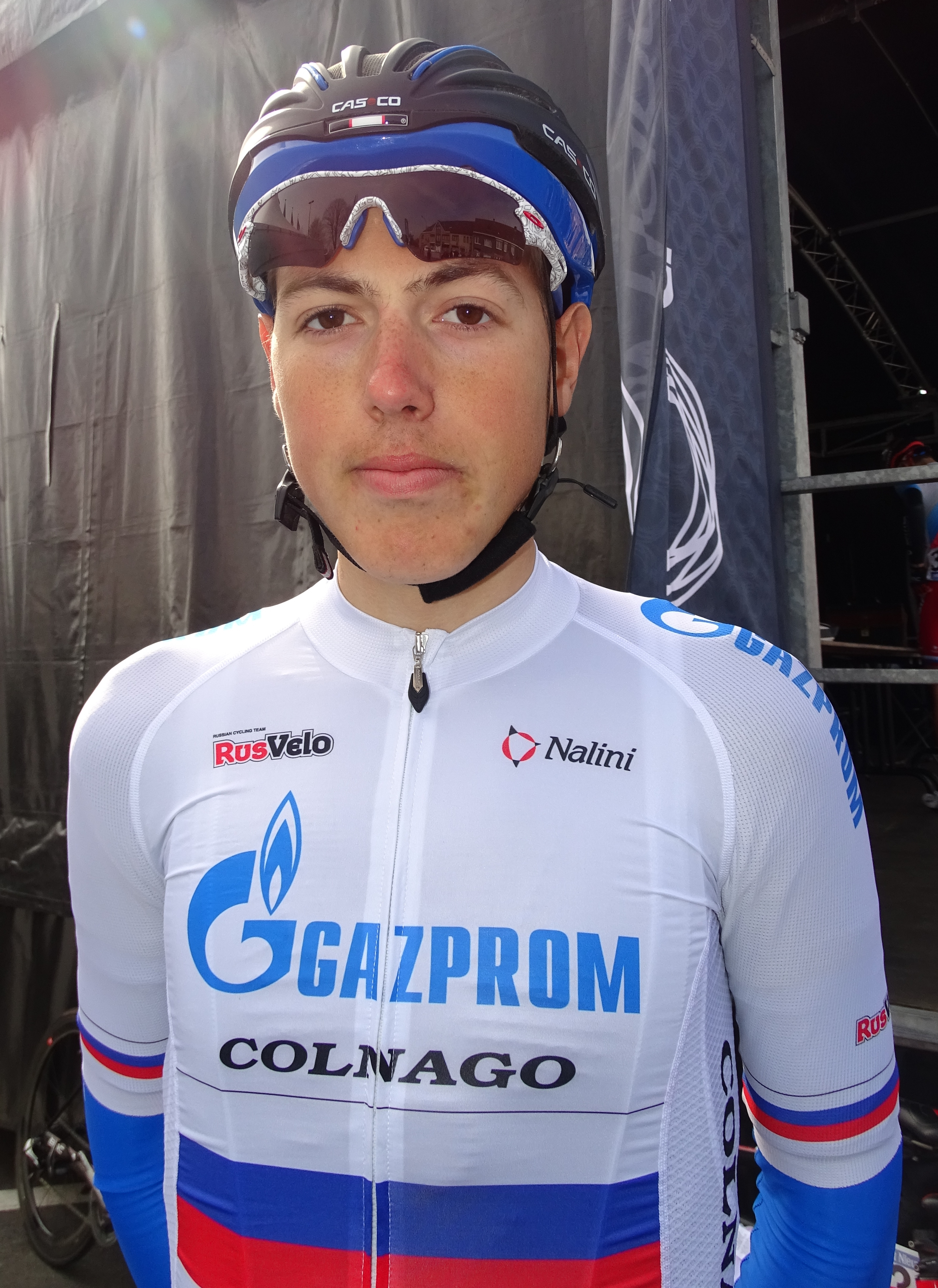
- Nych in 2016.

Personal information
- Full name: Artem Yuryevich Nych; Артём Юрьевич Ныч
- Born: 21 March 1995 (age 31) Kemerovo, Russia
- Height: 1.95 m (6 ft 5 in)
- Weight: 74 kg (163 lb)

Cycling career
- Sport: Cycling
- Current team: Anicolor / Campicarn
- Discipline: Road
- Role: Rider

Professional teams
- 2014: Russian Helicopters
- 2015–2022: RusVelo
- 2023–: Glassdrive–Q8–Anicolor

Major wins
- One-day races and Classics National Road Race Championships (2021)

Artem Yuryevich Nych (Russian: Артём Юрьевич Ныч; born 21 March 1995 in Kemerovo) is a Russian cyclist, who currently rides for UCI Continental team Anicolor / Campicarn.

== Major results ==
2013
8th Road race, UCI Junior Road World Championships
2014
3rd Road race, National Under-23 Road Championships
6th Overall Tour of Szeklerland

1st Young rider classification

8th Trofeo Internazionale Bastianelli
2015
1st Road race, National Under-23 Road Championships
2nd Trofeo Banca Popolare di Vicenza
4th Memorial Oleg Dyachenko
5th Overall Five Rings of Moscow
9th Overall Grand Prix of Sochi
2016
6th Gran Premio Palio del Recioto
6th Ronde van Vlaanderen U23
8th Time trial, UEC European Under-23 Road Championships
8th Trofeo Banca Popolare di Vicenza
10th Overall Route du Sud
2017
2nd Road race, National Road Championships
3rd Gran Premio di Poggiana
6th Overall Grand Prix Priessnitz spa
2018
7th Overall Tour of Croatia
10th Overall Tour of Austria
2019
3rd Time trial, National Road Championships
6th Overall Tour de l'Ain
9th Overall Vuelta a Asturias
2021 (1 pro win)
National Road Championships

1st Road race
5th Time trial

8th Overall Presidential Tour of Turkey
2023
1st Overall GP Beiras e Serra da Estrela
2nd Overall Troféu Joaquim Agostinho
3rd Clássica Aldeias do Xisto
4th Overall Volta a Portugal
2024 (3)
1st Overall Volta a Portugal

1st Stages 6 & 10 (ITT)

1st Overall GP Beiras e Serra da Estrela

1st Stage 1

1st Overall Grande Prémio Abimota

1st Stage 1

2nd Overall Grande Prémio O Jogo
2nd Overall Grande Prémio Douro Internacional
3rd Overall Troféu Joaquim Agostinho
2025 (1)
1st Overall Volta a Portugal

1st Combination classification

1st Overall Grande Prémio Douro Internacional

1st Stage 1

1st Overall Grande Prémio O Jogo

1st Stage 5

3rd Overall Grande Prémio Internacional Beiras e Serra da Estrela
4th Overall Troféu Joaquim Agostinho
4th Clássica Aldeias do Xisto
2026
1st Overall Grande Prémio O Jogo

1st Stage 4

1st Stage 3 (ITT) Volta ao Alentejo
6th Overall Troféu Joaquim Agostinho
7th Overall Grande Prémio Anicolor
10th Overall O Gran Camiño
