= Igor Frolov =

Russian cyclist

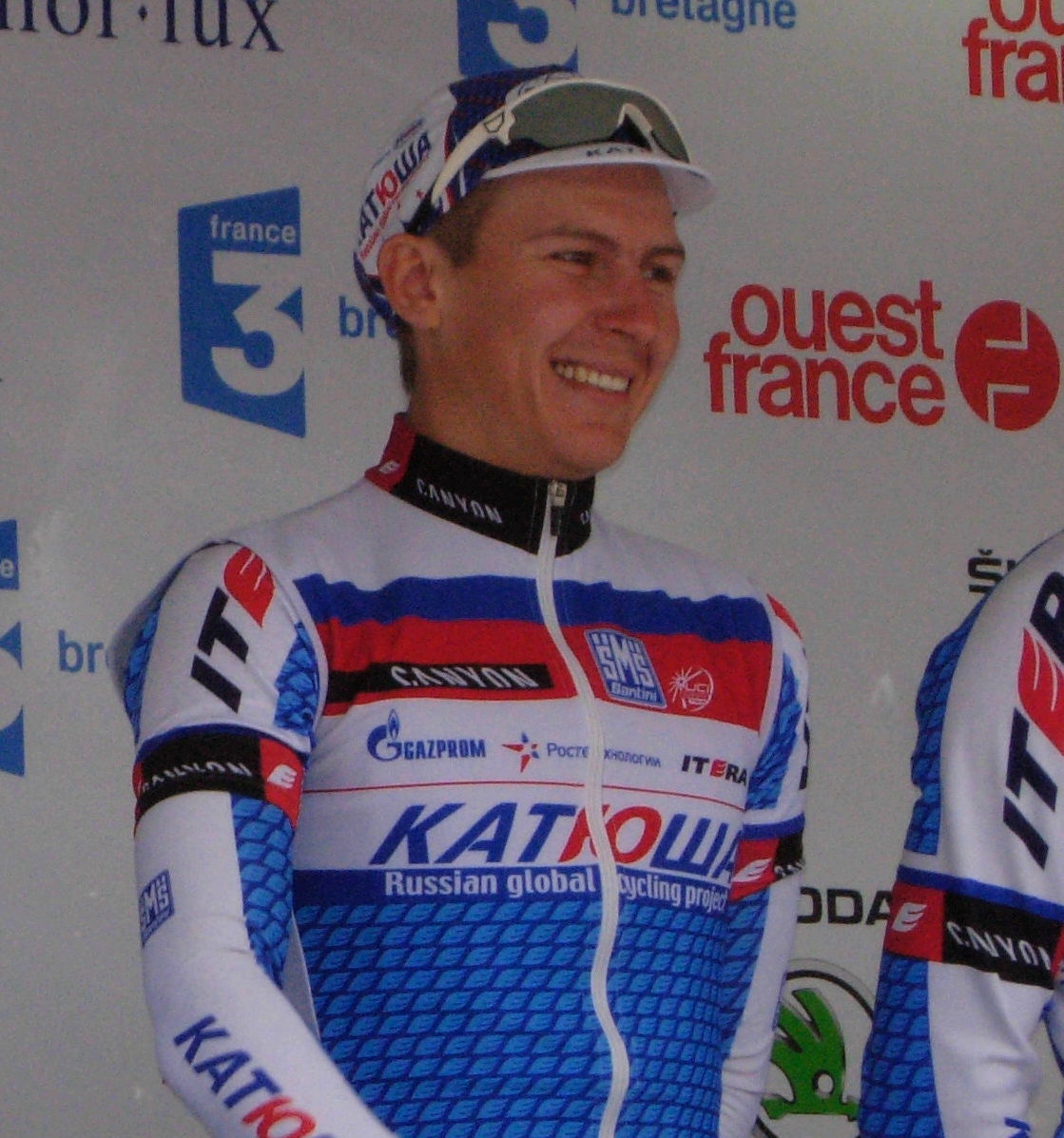
- Frolov at the 2013 Tour de Bretagne

Personal information
- Full name: Igor Igorevich Frolov
- Born: 23 January 1990 (age 36): Tula, Russian SFSR, Soviet Union; (now Russia)

Cycling career
- Sport: Cycling
- Current team: TP Ho Chi Minh New Group
- Discipline: Road
- Role: Rider

Amateur teams
- 2016–2022: Moscow Region
- 2023: Hồ Chí Minh Vinama
- 2024–: TP Ho Chi Minh New Group

Professional team
- 2011–2015: Itera–Katusha

Igor Igorevich Frolov (Russian: И́горь И́горевич Фроло́в; born 23 January 1990) is a Russian road cyclist, who currently ride for Vietnamese amateur team TP Ho Chi Minh New Group.

== Major results ==
2008
9th Overall Tour de la Région de Lodz
2010
1st Stage 5 Carpathia Couriers Paths
2011
7th Memorial Oleg Dyachenko
2014
1st Overall Friendship People North-Caucasus Stage Race

1st Stage 4 (ITT)

5th Overall Grand Prix of Sochi
2015
1st Stage 1 (TTT) Grand Prix of Adygeya
1st Stage 4 (ITT) Friendship People North-Caucasus Stage Race
3rd Hill-climb, National Road Championships
3rd Overall Grand Prix of Sochi

1st Stage 1 (TTT)

2016
1st Hill-climb, National Road Championships
2017
1st Overall Friendship People North-Caucasus Stage Race
1st Stage 2 Ufa Stage Race
2018
3rd Road race, National Road Championships
2019
1st Overall Grand Prix of Sochi

1st Stage 1

2nd Road race, National Road Championships
2020
2nd Road race, National Road Championships
2021
1st Overall Five Rings of Moscow

1st Points classification
1st Stage 1

2022
1st Overall HTV Cup
1st Mountains classification

1st Prologue & Stages 11 & 19

2024
1st Mountains classification HTV Cup
