= Kyrylo Tsarenko =

Ukrainian cyclist (born 2000)

Personal information
- Born: 13 October 2000 (age 26) Kropyvnytskyi, Ukraine

Cycling career
- Sport: Cycling
- Current team: Solution Tech NIPPO Rali
- Disciplines: Road; Track
- Role: Rider

Amateur teams
- 2018: Nikolaev Tsop
- 2019: Mykoliav Tsov
- 2020: ISD Cycling Team
- 2021: SC Golden Wheels
- 2023: Hopplà–Petroli Firenze–Don Camillo
- 2023: Ukraine Cycling Academy

Professional teams
- 2022: Gallina Ecotek Lucchini
- 2023: Team Corratec–Selle Italia (stagiaire)
- 2024–: Team Corratec–Vini Fantini

Major wins
- Stage races Tour of Hainan (2025)
Medal record
Men's track cycling
Representing Ukraine
UEC European Under-23 Championships
Bronze medal – third place	2022 Anadia	Scratch

Kyrylo Tsarenko (Ukrainian: Кирило Царенко; born 13 October 2000) is a Ukrainian cyclist, who currently rides for UCI ProTeam Solution Tech NIPPO Rali.

Tsarenko accepted a 12 month ban, some of it retrospective, for three late filings of whereabouts details. Tsarenko's ban covered July 2025 to the end of June 2026.

== Major results ==
=== Road ===
2019
3rd Time trial, National Under-23 Championships
2020
National Under-23 Championships

1st Time trial
1st Road race

2021
1st Time trial, National Under-23 Championships
7th Ruota d'Oro
2022
1st Overall Tour of Bulgaria

1st Young rider classification

2023
1st Targa Crocifisso
2nd Giro del Casentino
8th Trofeo Alcide De Gasperi
2024
1st Gran Premio Santa Rita
1st Mountains classification, Okolo Slovenska
1st Cupa Max Ausnit
8th Trofeo Matteotti
2025 (3 pro wins)
1st Overall Tour of Hainan

1st Stage 3

1st Trofeo Alcide De Gasperi
1st Stage 4 Tour of Slovenia

Voided results

~~1st Overall Tour de Kyushu~~

~~1st Stage 1~~

~~9th Memorial Marco Pantani~~

2026
1st Overall Tour of Kahramanmaraş

1st Stage 1

1st Ordu Coast to Summit
3rd Ordu Black Sea Classic
4th Gran Premio Colli Rovescalesi
6th Overall Sibiu Cycling Tour

=== Track ===
2018
3rd Team pursuit, National Championships
2019
1st Team pursuit, National Championships
2022
3rd Scratch, UEC European Under-23 Championships
