= Alexandre Bazhenov =

Russian cyclist

Personal information
- Full name: Alexandre Yuryevich Bazhenov
- Born: 26 April 1981 (age 45) Komsomolsk, Russia

Cycling career
- Sport: Cycling
- Current team: Retired
- Discipline: Road
- Role: Rider

Professional teams
- 2004–2006: Domina Vacanze
- 2007: Cinelli–OPD

Alexandre Yuryevich Bazhenov (Russian: Александр Юрьевич Баженов; born 26 April 1981) is a former Russian racing cyclist.

== Palmares ==
2003
National Road Race Champion
1st Trofeo Banca Popolare di Vicenza
1st Giro del Belvedere
1st Triptyque des Barrages

1st Stage 3

2nd Gran Premio Palio del Recioto
2nd Trofeo Alcide Degasperi
2008
2nd National Road Race Championships
