= Cupa Max Ausnit =

Cycling race in Romania

Cupa Max Ausniț
Race details
- Date: July-August
- Region: Lugoj, Timiș
- Local name(s): Cupa Max Ausnit
- Discipline: Road
- Competition: UCI Europe Tour
- Type: One-day
- Race director: Marko Zivanovic

History
- First edition: 23 July 2023; 2 years ago
- Editions: 2 (as of 2024)
- First winner: Nicolás Tivani (ARG)
- Most wins: No repeat winners
- Most recent: Kyrylo Tsarenko (UKR)

The Cupa Max Ausnit is a multi-day cycling race in Timiș, Romania established 2023. The race started as an amateur competition in 2012, sponsored by Steve Ausnit, son of Max Auschnitt, a local businessman and former member of the Senate of Romania. The race was named in his honor.

Since 2023 it has been part of UCI Europe Tour in category 1.2.

== Winners ==
Year	Country	Rider	Team
2023	Argentina	Nicolás Tivani	Team Corratec–Selle Italia
2024	Ukraine	Kyrylo Tsarenko	Team Corratec–Vini Fantini
