= Carlos Torres (cyclist) =

Venezuelan racing cyclist

Personal information
- Full name: Carlos Alberto Torres Villarreal
- Born: 10 January 1993 (age 33)

Cycling career
- Sport: Cycling
- Current team: JHS Grupo Moya
- Discipline: Road
- Role: Rider

Amateur teams
- 2014: PDVSA–Café Flor de Patria
- 2015: Café Flor de Patria–Emastru–Trujillo
- 2015–2016: Gobierno Bolivariano–Policia de Trujillo
- 2016–2017: JHS Aves–Intac.Tachira
- 2017–2018: Grupo JHS–Andiempaques
- 2019–2020: Deportivo Táchira–JHS
- 2021–: JHS Grupo Moya

Professional team
- 2018: China Continental Team of Gansu Bank

Carlos Alberto Torres Villarreal (born 10 January 1993) is a Venezuelan road cyclist, who currently rides for Venezuelan amateur team JHS Grupo Moya.

== Major results ==
2016
2nd Road race, National Road Championships
2017
1st Overall Vuelta a Venezuela
1st Stage 6 Vuelta al Táchira
2018
6th Overall Vuelta al Táchira
2021
2nd Overall Vuelta a Venezuela
2023
1st Overall Trans-Himalaya Cycling Race

1st Stage 1
