= Luis Carlos Chía =

Colombian cyclist

Personal information
- Full name: Luis Carlos Chía Bermúdez
- Born: 8 February 1997 (age 29) Soacha, Colombia

Cycling career
- Sport: Cycling
- Current team: Supergiros–ALC Manizales
- Discipline: Road
- Role: Rider
- Rider type: Sprinter

Amateur teams
- 2017: Manzana Postobón Elite
- 2017: Team Manzana Postobón (stagiaire)
- 2018: Banco AV Villas
- 2019: Néctar–Gobernación de Cundinamarca
- 2019: Team AV Villas–Auteco
- 2020: Colnago CM Team
- 2023–: Supergiros–ALC Manizales

Professional teams
- 2019: Team Manzana Postobón
- 2021–2022: Colnago CM Team

Luis Carlos Chía Bermúdez (born 8 February 1997 in Soacha) is a Colombian cyclist, who currently rides for amateur team Supergiros–ALC Manizales.

== Major results ==
2015
1st Stage 1 Vuelta a Colombia Juniors
2019
1st Stage 5 Clásico RCN
1st Stage 3 Clásica de Girardot
2020
1st Stage 1 Clásica de Rionegro
2021
1st Stage 2 Vuelta a Colombia
1st Stage 2 Vuelta al Tolima
1st Stage 3 Clásica de Girardot
2022
1st Stages 1 & 3 Vuelta a Colombia
1st Stage 2 Vuelta al Valle del Cauca
1st Stages 2 & 3 Clásica de Girardot
2023
1st Points classification, Tour of Poyang Lake I
Tour of Poyang Lake II

1st Points classification
1st Stages 1 & 2

1st Stage 3 Vuelta a Extremadura
2nd Overall Tour of Binzhou

1st Stage 2

1st Stage 2 Trans-Himalaya Cycling Race
