= Petr Rikunov =

Russian bicycle racer

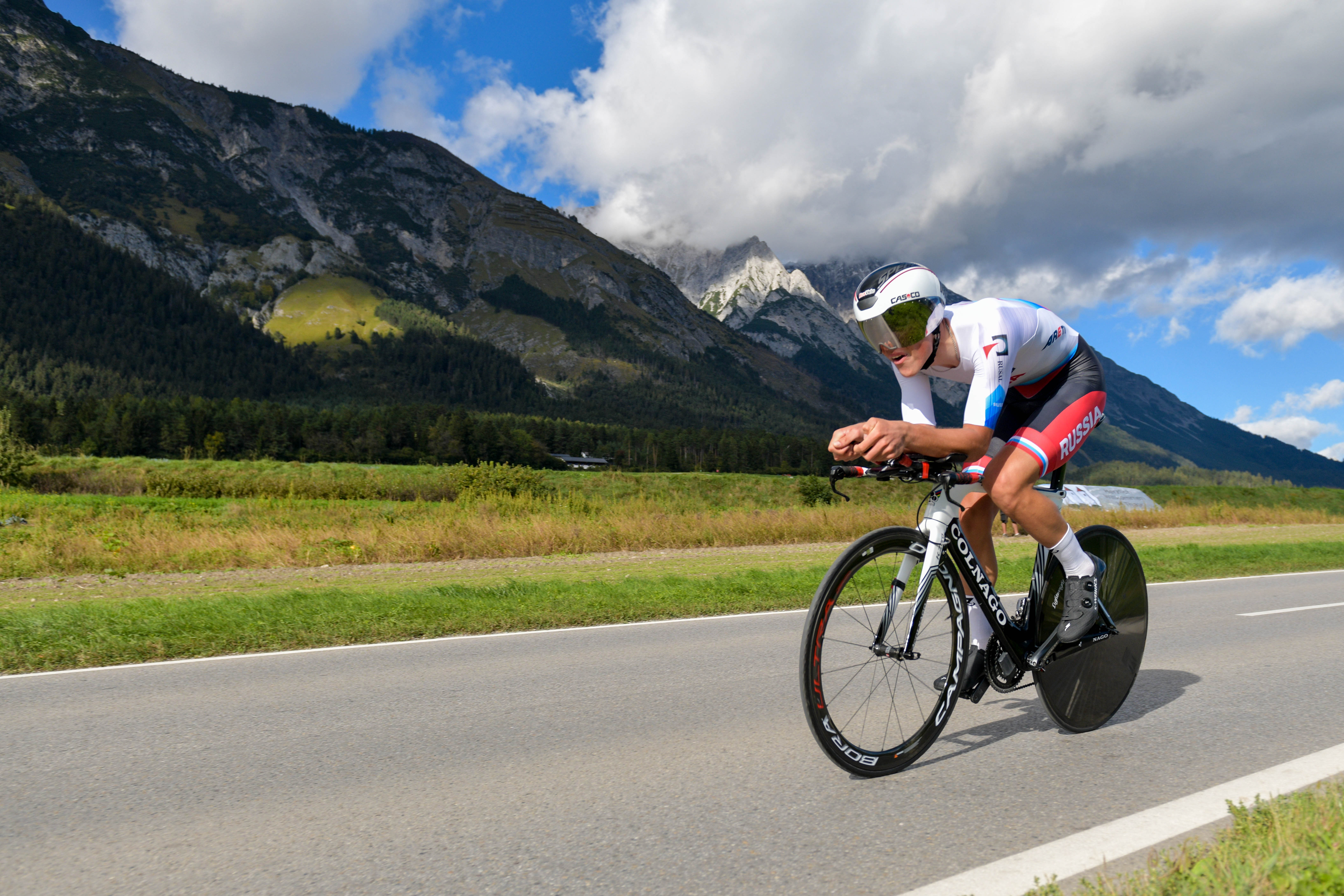
- Rikunov in 2018

Personal information
- Born: 24 February 1997 (age 29) Nizhny Novgorod, Russia
- Height: 1.85 m (6 ft 1 in)
- Weight: 71 kg (157 lb)

Cycling career
- Sport: Cycling
- Current team: Wheeltop Rotor Chengdu Team
- Discipline: Road
- Role: Rider

Amateur teams
- 2016: Tyumen Region
- 2017: Gazprom–Rusvelo U23
- 2017: Krasnodar Region
- 2018: Caja Rural–Seguros RGA amateur
- 2022: Tyumen Region
- 2023–2024: Tập Đoàn Lộc Trời

Professional teams
- 2019–2022: Gazprom–RusVelo
- 2023: Yunnan Lvshan Landscape
- 2024–: Chengdu Cycling Team

Major wins
- One-day races and Classics National Road Race Championships (2022)

Petr Rikunov (Russian: Пётр Рикунов; born 24 February 1997) is a Russian cyclist, who currently rides for UCI Continental team Wheeltop Rotor Chengdu Team.

== Major results ==
2014
1st Road race, National Junior Road Championships
6th Time trial, UEC European Junior Road Championships
2017
National Under-23 Road Championships

1st Road race
1st Time trial

4th Road race, UEC European Under–23 Road Championships
2018
National Under-23 Road Championships

1st Road race
2nd Time trial

1st San Juan Sari Nagusia
1st Stage 1 Grand Prix of Sochi
2019
5th Time trial, National Road Championships
2022
National Road Championships

1st Road race
2nd Time trial

1st Overall Udmurt Republic Stage Race

1st Stages 1, 2 & 3

1st Nart of Adygea
3rd Overall Five Rings of Moscow

1st Stage 4

2023
1st Overall HTV Cup

1st Stages 1, 5, 7, 8, 11, 15, 16, 18, 21 & 22

1st Overall Five Rings of Moscow

1st Stage 2

3rd Overall Tour of Huangshan
2024
National Road Championships

1st Road race
1st Time trial

1st Overall HTV Cup

1st Stages 1, 2, 3, 6, 7 (TTT), 9, 12, 15, 19, 21 & 23

1st Tour of Poyang Lake

1st Stages 1 (TTT), 2, & 5

2nd Overall Trans-Himalaya Cycling Race

1st Stage 2

2025 (1 pro win)
1st Time trial, National Road Championships
1st Tour of Poyang Lake
1st Stage 7 Tour of Magnificent Qinghai
6th Overall Tour of Hainan
2026 (1)
1st Stage 4 Tour de Langkawi
