= Romes Gainetdinov =

Russian cyclist

Personal information
- Born: 6 May 1967 (age 59) Sverdlovsk, Russia

Cycling career
- Sport: Cycling
- Current team: Retired
- Discipline: Road
- Role: Rider

Amateur teams
- 1988–1990: USSR national team
- 1990: Team Didier-Louis

Professional teams
- 1991–1993: Lotus–Festina
- 1994–1996: Santa Clara–Samara

Romes Gainetdinov (born 6 May 1967 in Sverdlovsk) is a Russian former road racing cyclist.

== Major results ==
1988
2nd Overall Hessen Rundfahrt
1989
1st Duo Normand (with Pavel Tonkov)
3rd Overall Tour du Poitou-Charentes
1991
8th Giro dell'Emilia
1992
1st Stage 15 Volta a Portugal
3rd Overall Circuito Montañés
1993
3rd Clásica de Almería
1994
1st National Road Race Championships
1995
1st Overall Grande Prémio Abimota
6th Subida al Naranco

=== Grand Tour general classification results timeline ===
Grand Tour	1991	1992	1993	1994	1995	1996
Giro d'Italia	—	34	46	—	—	—
Tour de France	—	—	32	70	61	55
Vuelta a España	55	—	—	—	—	—

Legend
—	Did not compete
DNF	Did not finish
