= HTV Cup (cycling) =

Vietnamese bicycle stage race

Ho Chi Minh City Television National Cycling Race
Race details
- Date: April
- Region: Vietnam
- Local name: Cuộc đua xe đạp toàn quốc tranh Cúp truyền hình Thành phố Hồ Chí Minh (in Vietnamese)
- Discipline: Road race
- Type: Stage race
- Organiser: Ho Chi Minh City Radio Television
- Web site: duaxedap.hplus.com.vn

History
- First edition: 1989; 37 years ago
- Editions: 38 (as of 2026)
- First winner: Lư Hồng Đức (VIE)
- Most wins: Trương Quốc Thắng (VIE) (4 wins)
- Most recent: Uladzislau Yarash (BLR)

The Ho Chi Minh City Television National Cycling Race (Vietnamese: Cuộc đua xe đạp toàn quốc tranh Cúp truyền hình Thành phố Hồ Chí Minh), or simply known as the HTV Cup, is a road bicycle stage race held annually in Vietnam. It was first run in 1989. Jointly organised by Ho Chi Minh City Radio Television and Vietnam Cycling Federation, the race is held every April to celebrate the anniversary of national reunification and other major holidays.

The most successful rider is Trương Quốc Thắng, with four victories.

== Past winners ==
Year	Country	Rider	Team
1989	Vietnam	Lư Hồng Đức	Ho Chi Minh City Police
1990	Vietnam	Vương Chí Thành	Tân Bình Export Import
1991	Vietnam	Ngô Quốc Dũng	An Giang
1992	Vietnam	Trương Huy Hồng	Thanh Bình Hotel
1993	Vietnam	Huỳnh Kim Hùng	Thanh Bình Hotel
1994	Vietnam	Nguyễn Văn Hiệp	Saigon Port
1995	Vietnam	Võ Hải Thanh	Saigon Port
1996	Vietnam	Võ Hải Thanh	Saigon Port
1997	Vietnam	Trương Quốc Thắng	Thanh Bình Hotel
1998	Vietnam	Trương Quốc Thắng	Thanh Bình Hotel
1999	Vietnam	Nguyễn Thành Quyết	Saigon Port
2000	Vietnam	Nguyễn Hữu Đức (Note: Later changed his name to Nguyễn Văn Đức in 2006.)	An Giang Plant Protection Service
2001	Vietnam	Trương Quốc Thắng	Thanh Bình Hotel
2002	Vietnam	Trương Quốc Thắng	Thanh Bình Hotel
2003	Vietnam	Trịnh Phát Đạt	Domesco Đồng Tháp
2004	South Korea	Park Sung-baek	Seoul, South Korea
2005	South Korea	Suh Seoh-kyu	Seoul, South Korea
2006	Vietnam	Lê Nguyễn Thành Nhân	An Giang Plant Protection Service
2007	South Korea	Oh Se-yong	Seoul, South Korea
2008	Vietnam	Nguyễn Văn Đức	An Giang Plant Protection Service
2009	South Korea	Gong Hyo-suk	Seoul, South Korea
2010	Mongolia	Tuguldur Tuulkhangai	Mongolia
2011	Vietnam	Hồ Văn Phúc	ADC Vĩnh Long Television
2012	Vietnam	Bùi Minh Thụy	ADC Vĩnh Long Television
2013	Vietnam	Trần Thanh Điền	Saigon Plant Protection Service
2014	Vietnam	Hồ Huỳnh Vạn An	An Giang Plant Protection Service
2015	Vietnam	Nguyễn Trường Tài	VUS Ho Chi Minh City
2016	Vietnam	Nguyễn Trường Tài	VUS Ho Chi Minh City
2017	Laos	Ariya Phounsavath	VUS Ho Chi Minh City
2018	Vietnam	Nguyễn Thành Tâm	Gạo Hạt Ngọc Trời An Giang
2019	Spain	Javier Sardá Pérez	VUS Ho Chi Minh City
2020	Spain	Javier Sardá Pérez	Ho Chi Minh City
2021	France	Loïc Desriac	Bikelife Đồng Nai
2022	Russia	Igor Frolov	Ho Chi Minh City Vinama
2023	Russia	Petr Rikunov	Tập đoàn Lộc Trời An Giang
2024	Russia	Petr Rikunov	Tập đoàn Lộc Trời An Giang
2025	Russia	Mikhail Fokin	Tập đoàn Lộc Trời An Giang
2026	Belarus	Uladzislau Yarash	Ho Chi Minh City New Group
