= Nils Sinschek =

Dutch cyclist

Personal information
- Born: 24 June 1998 (age 28) Maastricht, Netherlands

Cycling career
- Sport: Cycling
- Current team: Unibet Rose Rockets
- Disciplines: Road; Gravel
- Role: Rider

Amateur teams
- 2016: Zannata–Galloo Cycling Team
- 2017–2018: LottoNL–Jumbo–De Jonge Renner

Professional teams
- 2019–2020: Development Team Sunweb
- 2021–2025: ABLOC CT
- 2026–: Li-Ning Star

Nils Sinschek (born 24 June 1998) is a Dutch professional racing cyclist, who currently rides for UCI Continental team Li-Ning Star.

== Major results ==
2015
9th Menin-Kemmel-Menin
2016
8th Route des Géants
2018
5th Road race, National Under-23 Championships
2019
3rd Time trial, National Under-23 Championships
9th Overall Le Tour de Savoie Mont Blanc
2020
1st Stage 2b (TTT) Ronde de l'Isard
5th Road race, National Under-23 Championships
2023 (1 pro win)
1st Stage 2 Tour of Qinghai Lake
2024
1st Ronde van Ossendrecht
5th Overall Tour of Poyang Lake
2025
3rd Overall Tour of Poyang Lake

1st Stages 3 & 8 (ITT)

8th Overall Tour of Hainan

1st Mountains classification

2026
2nd Overall Tour de Kumano

1st Points classification
1st Stages 1 & 4

2nd Yellow River Estuary (Dongying) Road Cycling Race
3rd Overall Tour de Gyeongnam
4th Overall Grand Prix Jizzakh
