= Alexander Bespalov =

Russian bicycle racer

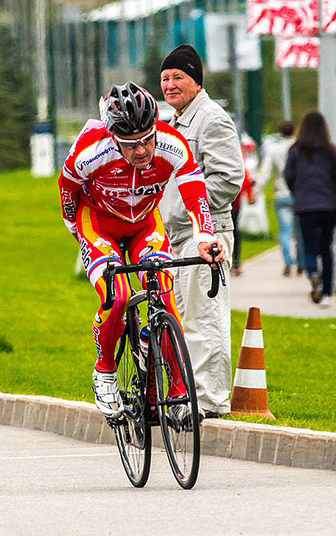

Personal information
- Born: 10 May 1981 (age 45) Naberezhnye Chelny, Russia

Cycling career
- Sport: Cycling
- Current team: Retired
- Discipline: Road
- Role: Rider
- Rider type: Time Trialist

Professional teams
- 2004: Miche
- 2006–2007: Premier

Alexander Bespalov (born 10 May 1981) is a former Russian racing cyclist.

== Palmares ==
2001
2nd European Under-23 Time Trial Championships
2002
1st Coppa della Pace
2nd European Under-23 Time Trial Championships
2nd UCI Under-23 World Time Trial Championships
3rd Giro delle Regioni
2003
2nd National Time Trial Championships
3rd UCI Under-23 World Time Trial Championships
2004
World Military Time Trial Champion
National Time Trial Champion
2005
2nd National Time Trial Championships
2006
National Time Trial Champion
2nd Chrono Champenois
2007
3rd National Time Trial Championships
