= Oleg Zhukov =

Russian bicycle racer (born 1976)

Personal information
- Born: 9 February 1976 (age 50)

Cycling career
- Sport: Cycling
- Current team: Retired
- Discipline: Road
- Role: Rider

Amateur teams
- 2001: Olio Vezza-Brunero-Boeris
- 2002: CC Étupes
- 2003: Mikomax–Browar Staropolski

Professional teams
- 1998: BigMat–Auber 93 (stagiaire)
- 1999–2000: BigMat–Auber 93
- 2004: Team Nippo

Oleg Zhukov (born 9 February 1976; Russian: Олег Жуков) is a Russian former road cyclist.

== Major results ==
1998
1st Time trial, European Under-23 Road Championships
1st Time trial, National Road Championships
2000
2nd Time trial, National Road Championships
2001
5th Tour du Finistère
2003
1st Overall Course Cycliste de Solidarnosc et des Champions Olympiques
National Road Championships

3rd Road race
4th Time trial

3rd Overall Tour de Serbie

1st Stage 1

5th Overall Tour de Normandie
2004
2nd Time trial, National Road Championships
2nd Clásica Internacional Txuma
10th Overall Course Cycliste de Solidarnosc et des Champions Olympiques
10th Overall Volta a Tarragona
