= 2015 Driedaagse van West-Vlaanderen =

2015 UCI Europe Tour

Race details
- Dates: 6–8 March 2015
- Stages: 3
- Distance: 365.6 km (227.2 mi)
- Winning time: 8h 24' 37"

Results
Jersey awarded to the overall winner	Winner	Yves Lampaert (BEL)	(Etixx–Quick-Step)
	Second	Anton Vorobyev (RUS)	(Team Katusha)
	Third	Jesse Sergent (NZL)	(Trek Factory Racing)
Jersey awarded to the points classification winner	Points	Yves Lampaert (BEL)	(Etixx–Quick-Step)
Jersey awarded to the youth classification winner	Youth	Yves Lampaert (BEL)	(Etixx–Quick-Step)
Jersey awarded to the sprints classification winner	Sprints	Tim Kerkhof (NED)	(Team Roompot)
	Team	Etixx–Quick-Step	

The 2015 Driedaagse van West-Vlaanderen was the 69th edition of the Driedaagse van West-Vlaanderen (English: Three Days of West Flanders) cycling stage race. Rated as a 2.1 event by the UCI as part of the UCI Europe Tour, the race took place from 6 to 8 March 2015.

The defending champion was Gert Jõeäär (Cofidis), who won the 2014 race, which used a very similar course, after victory in the opening time trial. He was succeeded in 2015 by Yves Lampaert (Etixx–Quick-Step), who came fourth in the prologue, won the first road stage of the race from a breakaway and defended his race lead in the final stage. As well as winning the overall classification, he won the points, youth and West Flanders classifications, while his team won the teams classification.

== Teams ==
24 teams were selected to take part in the race. Eight of these were UCI WorldTeams; 11 were UCI Professional Continental teams; five were UCI Continental teams.

WorldTeams

- AG2R La Mondiale
- BMC Racing Team
- Etixx–Quick-Step
- FDJ
- Lotto–Soudal
- Team Katusha
- LottoNL–Jumbo
- Trek Factory Racing

Professional Continental teams

- Bora–Argon 18
- Caja Rural–Seguros RGA
- Cofidis
- Cult Energy Pro Cycling
- MTN–Qhubeka
- Nippo–Vini Fantini
- Team Europcar
- Team Roompot
- Topsport Vlaanderen–Baloise
- UnitedHealthcare
- Wanty–Groupe Gobert

Continental teams

- An Post–Chain Reaction
- Roubaix–Lille Métropole
- Vastgoedservice–Golden Palace
- Veranclassic–Ekoi
- Verandas Willems

== Route ==
The 2015 race included three stages. The first of these was a 7 km (4.3 mi) prologue individual time trial, which was followed by two road stages. The first road stage was mostly flat, except for the climb of the Oude Kwaremont midway through. The second similarly included three hills (the Rodeberg, the Kemmelberg and the Monteberg) in the middle part of the race, with a finale that again included some small climbs.

== Stages ==
=== Prologue ===
6 March 2015 — Middelkerke to Middelkerke, 7 km (4.3 mi), individual time trial (ITT)

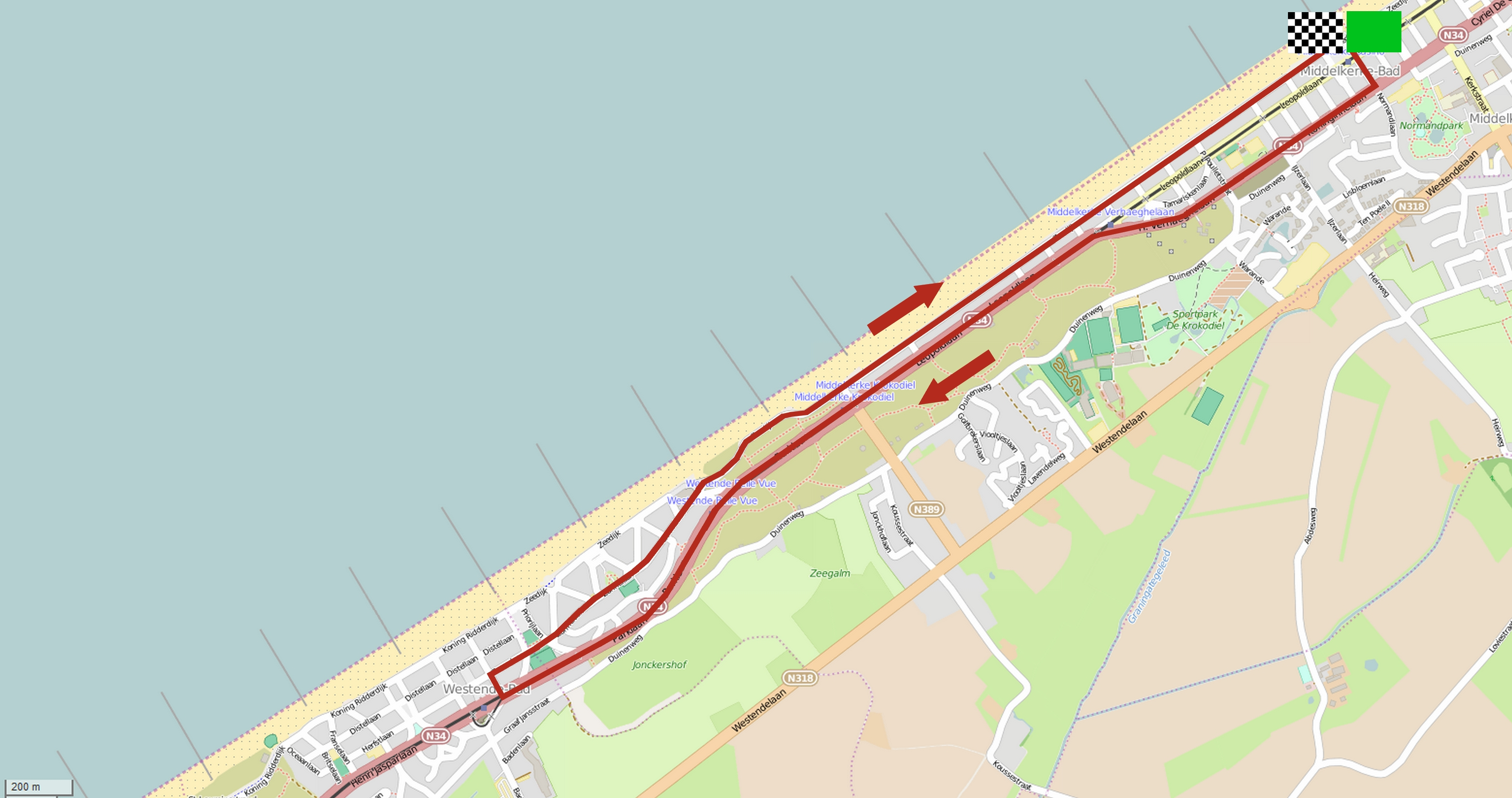
Route of the prologue

The first stage of the race was a 7-kilometre (4.3-mile) prologue individual time trial in Middelkerke. The course was an out-and-back route along the northern Belgian coast; it took place in sunny conditions with some gusts of wind.

The time trial was won by Anton Vorobyev (Team Katusha), the first professional win of his career. He was the only rider to complete the course in under eight minutes. Jesse Sergent (Trek Factory Racing) finished second, with Jan Bárta (Bora–Argon 18) third.

Prologue result and General classification after prologue
Rank	Rider	Team	Time
1	Anton Vorobyev (RUS)	Team Katusha	7' 57"
2	Jesse Sergent (NZL)	Trek Factory Racing	+ 4"
3	Jan Bárta (CZE)	Bora–Argon 18	+ 5"
4	Yves Lampaert (BEL)	Etixx–Quick-Step	+ 8"
5	Martijn Keizer (NED)	LottoNL–Jumbo	+ 9"
6	Alexis Gougeard (FRA)	AG2R La Mondiale	+ 11"
7	Jempy Drucker (LUX)	BMC Racing Team	+ 11"
8	Danilo Wyss (SUI)	BMC Racing Team	+ 12"
9	Christophe Laporte (FRA)	Cofidis	+ 12"
10	Łukasz Wiśniowski (POL)	Etixx–Quick-Step	+ 13"

=== Stage 1 ===
7 March 2015 — Bruges to Harelbeke, 174.1 km (108.2 mi)

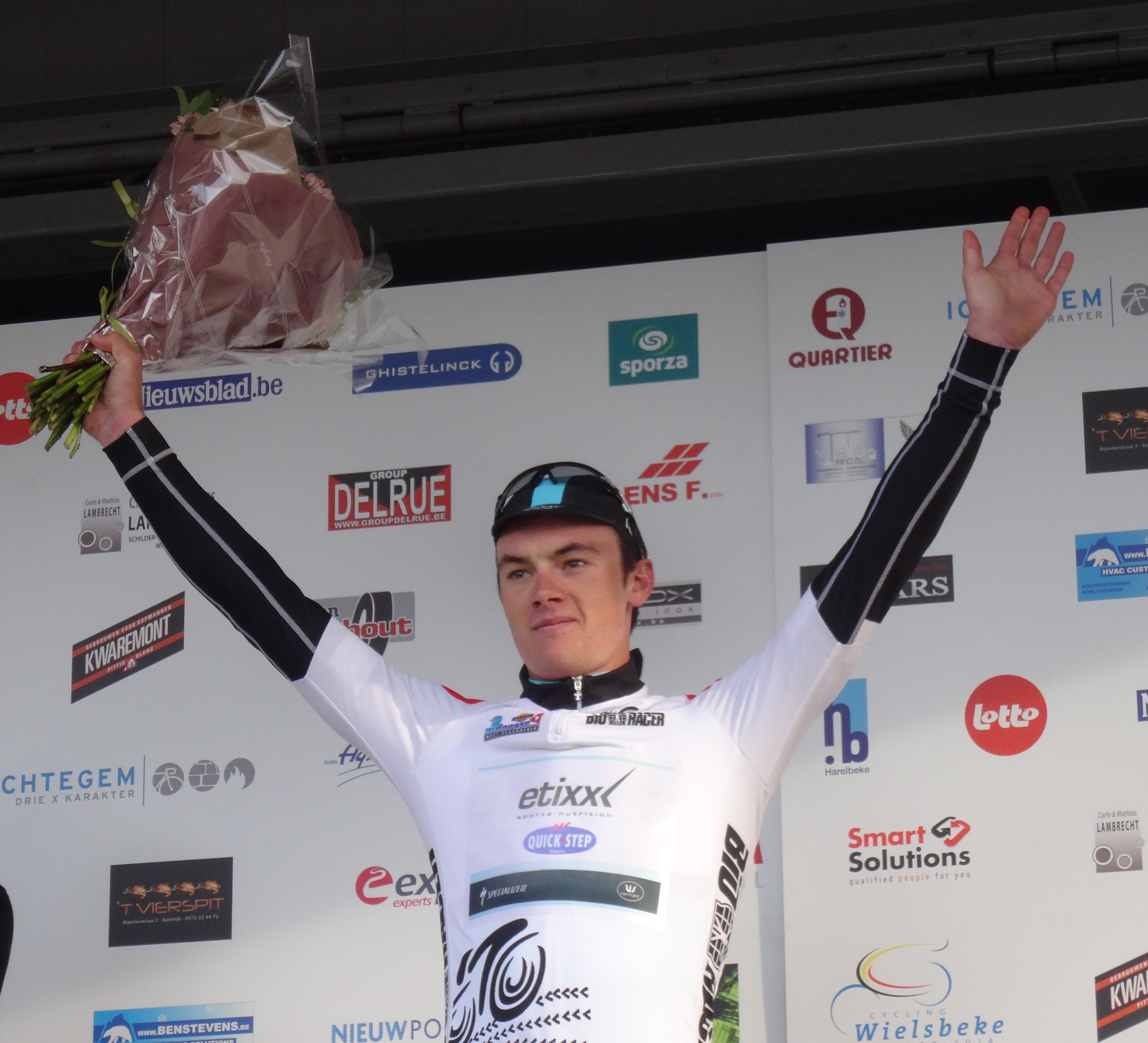
Yves Lampaert, winner of stage 1, wearing the white jersey of the best rider from West Flanders

The first road stage of the race was a 174.1-kilometre (108.2-mile) route from Bruges to Harelbeke. The principal difficulties came in the middle part of the stage, with the Oude Kwaremont the most significant climb.

An early breakaway was formed of four riders: Tim Kerkhof (Team Roompot), Gijs Van Hoecke (Topsport Vlaanderen–Baloise), Alistair Slater (An Post–Chain Reaction) and Gorik Gardeyn (Veranclassic–Ekoi). They were not allowed a significant advantage by the peloton and were caught after 110 kilometres (68 miles) of racing. The main break of the day was then formed with 57 kilometres (35 miles) remaining by five riders: Yves Lampaert (Etixx–Quick-Step), Tosh Van der Sande (Lotto–Soudal), Alexis Gougeard (AG2R La Mondiale), Sander Cordeel (Vastgoedservice–Golden Palace) and Mirko Selvaggi (Wanty–Groupe Gobert). This break, which included several riders threatening to Vorobyev's lead, was chased by Team Katusha. The peloton was never quite able to make contact with the breakaway, which was reanimated by a sprint for an intermediate sprint. Cordeel attacked in the final kilometre, but was unable to create a gap. Lampaert followed Van der Sande's wheel and was able to pass him in the final metres to take the stage win. The peloton finished four seconds later.

Thanks to the lead over the peloton and the bonus seconds for the stage win, Lampaert took over the overall lead of the race from Vorobyev, as well as the lead of the points and young riders classification.

Stage 1 result
Rank	Rider	Team	Time
1	Yves Lampaert (BEL)	Etixx–Quick-Step	3h 54' 52"
2	Tosh Van der Sande (BEL)	Lotto–Soudal	+ 0"
3	Sander Cordeel (BEL)	Vastgoedservice–Golden Palace	+ 0"
4	Alexis Gougeard (FRA)	AG2R La Mondiale	+ 0"
5	Mirko Selvaggi (ITA)	Wanty–Groupe Gobert	+ 0"
6	Danny van Poppel (NED)	Trek Factory Racing	+ 4"
7	Gianni Meersman (BEL)	Etixx–Quick-Step	+ 4"
8	Roy Jans (BEL)	Wanty–Groupe Gobert	+ 4"
9	Rudy Barbier (FRA)	Roubaix–Lille Métropole	+ 4"
10	Wesley Kreder (NED)	Team Roompot	+ 4"

General classification after stage 1
Rank	Rider	Team	Time
1	Yves Lampaert (BEL)	Etixx–Quick-Step	4h 02' 45"
2	Anton Vorobyev (RUS)	Team Katusha	+ 8"
3	Jesse Sergent (NZL)	Trek Factory Racing	+ 12"
4	Jan Bárta (CZE)	Bora–Argon 18	+ 13"
5	Alexis Gougeard (FRA)	AG2R La Mondiale	+ 14"
6	Martijn Keizer (NED)	LottoNL–Jumbo	+ 17"
7	Jempy Drucker (LUX)	BMC Racing Team	+ 19"
8	Christophe Laporte (FRA)	Cofidis	+ 20"
9	Łukasz Wiśniowski (POL)	Etixx–Quick-Step	+ 21"
10	Hugo Houle (CAN)	AG2R La Mondiale	+ 21"

=== Stage 2 ===
8 March 2015 — Nieuwpoort to Ichtegem, 184.5 km (114.6 mi)

The final stage of the race was a 184.5-kilometre (115-mile) route between Nieuwpoort and Ichtegem. The middle part of the race included some difficult climbs, including the Rodeberg, Kemmelberg and Monteberg. The race then finished with three laps of a circuit in Ichtegem that contained two moderate climbs.

An early break was formed by Tim Kerkhof (Team Roompot), Louis Verhelst (Cofidis), Riccardo Stacchiotti (Nippo–Vini Fantini), Jimmy Engoulvent (Team Europcar), Jelle Wallays (Topsport Vlaanderen–Baloise), Edwig Cammaerts (Veranclassic–Ekoi) and Stef Van Zummeren (Verandas Willems). They gained a four-minute lead over the peloton. There were then attacks from the peloton, with seventeen more riders joining the front group. These included Lampaert, the race leader, and three teammates. In the final circuits of the race, however, these riders were brought to the main peloton and the stage ended in a bunch sprint. This was won by Danny van Poppel, led out by his brother Boy van Poppel.

Lampaert finished in eleventh place on the stage, securing his victory in the race and also taking the youth and points classifications.

Stage 2 result
Rank	Rider	Team	Time
1	Danny van Poppel (NED)	Trek Factory Racing	4h 21' 52"
2	Kris Boeckmans (BEL)	Lotto–Soudal	+ 0"
3	Michael Van Staeyen (BEL)	Cofidis	+ 0"
4	Jempy Drucker (LUX)	BMC Racing Team	+ 0"
5	Gianni Meersman (BEL)	Etixx–Quick-Step	+ 0"
6	Rick Zabel (GER)	BMC Racing Team	+ 0"
7	Roy Jans (BEL)	Wanty–Groupe Gobert	+ 0"
8	Maxime Daniel (FRA)	AG2R La Mondiale	+ 0"
9	Sean De Bie (BEL)	Lotto–Soudal	+ 0"
10	Baptiste Planckaert (BEL)	Roubaix–Lille Métropole	+ 0"

Final general classification
Rank	Rider	Team	Time
1	Yves Lampaert (BEL)	Etixx–Quick-Step	8h 24' 37"
2	Anton Vorobyev (RUS)	Team Katusha	+ 8"
3	Jesse Sergent (NZL)	Trek Factory Racing	+ 12"
4	Jan Bárta (CZE)	Bora–Argon 18	+ 12"
5	Alexis Gougeard (FRA)	AG2R La Mondiale	+ 14"
6	Danny van Poppel (NED)	Trek Factory Racing	+ 16"
7	Jempy Drucker (LUX)	BMC Racing Team	+ 17"
8	Martijn Keizer (NED)	LottoNL–Jumbo	+ 17"
9	Christophe Laporte (FRA)	Cofidis	+ 20"
10	Łukasz Wiśniowski (POL)	Etixx–Quick-Step	+ 21"

== Classification leadership table ==
There were four major rankings awarded in the 2015 Driedaagse van West-Vlaanderen. A yellow jersey was awarded to the general classification leader (time bonuses were awarded on the road stages at the stage finish and on intermediate sprints); a green jersey was awarded to the points classification leader (points were won at stage finishes and intermediate sprints); a red jersey was awarded to the sprints classification leader (points won at intermediate sprints only); and a black jersey was awarded to the best young rider in the general classification. A white jersey was also awarded to the best local rider after each stage, but this was not worn during racing.

Stage	Winner	General classification	Points classification	Sprints classification	Young rider classification	West Flanders classification	Teams classification
P	Anton Vorobyev	Anton Vorobyev	Anton Vorobyev	Not awarded (Note: Jersey awarded to Anton Vorobyev on the podium, but no points were on offer during the prologue.)	Anton Vorobyev	Yves Lampaert	Etixx–Quick-Step
1	Yves Lampaert	Yves Lampaert	Yves Lampaert	Gorik Gardeyn	Yves Lampaert	Yves Lampaert	Etixx–Quick-Step
2	Danny van Poppel	Yves Lampaert	Yves Lampaert	Tim Kerkhof	Yves Lampaert	Yves Lampaert	Etixx–Quick-Step
Final		Yves Lampaert	Yves Lampaert	Tim Kerkhof	Yves Lampaert	Yves Lampaert	Etixx–Quick-Step
