= Charles Guilbert =

French cyclist

Personal information
- Born: 15 May 1972 (age 54) Caen, France

Cycling career
- Sport: Cycling
- Current team: Retired
- Discipline: Road
- Role: Rider

Amateur team
- 2004: VC Rouen 76

Professional teams
- 1995–1998: Mutuelle de Seine-et-Marne
- 1999: Home Market–Ville de Charleroi
- 2000–2002: Bonjour
- 2003: Marlux–Wincor Nixdorf
- 2005–2007: Bretagne–Jean Floc'h

Charles Guilbert (born 15 May 1972) is a French former professional road cyclist.

== Major results ==
1996
2nd Overall Ruban Granitier Breton

1st Stage 1

1997
1st Stage 1 Tour de l'Avenir
7th Overall Circuit de Lorraine
1998
2nd Clásica de Sabiñánigo
5th Overall Tour de Serbie
8th GP de la Ville de Rennes
1999
3rd Boucles de l'Aulne
10th GP Villafranca de Ordizia
2000
3rd Polynormande
2001
10th Tour du Doubs
2002
3rd Paris–Bourges
5th Grand Prix de la Ville de Lillers
8th Boucles de l'Aulne
8th Overall Tour du Limousin
2004
5th Overall Tour Nord-Isère
9th Overall Tour de Normandie
2005
1st Stage 5 Ruban Granitier Breton
1st Overall Tour de Gironde

1st Stage 1

1st Stage 3 Boucles de la Mayenne
3rd Polymultipliée lyonnaise
5th Tro-Bro Léon
2006
3rd Paris–Camembert
6th Paris–Troyes
2007
6th Paris–Camembert
8th Overall Circuit de Lorraine
10th Paris–Troyes
