= Tim Kerkhof =

Dutch cyclist (born 1993)

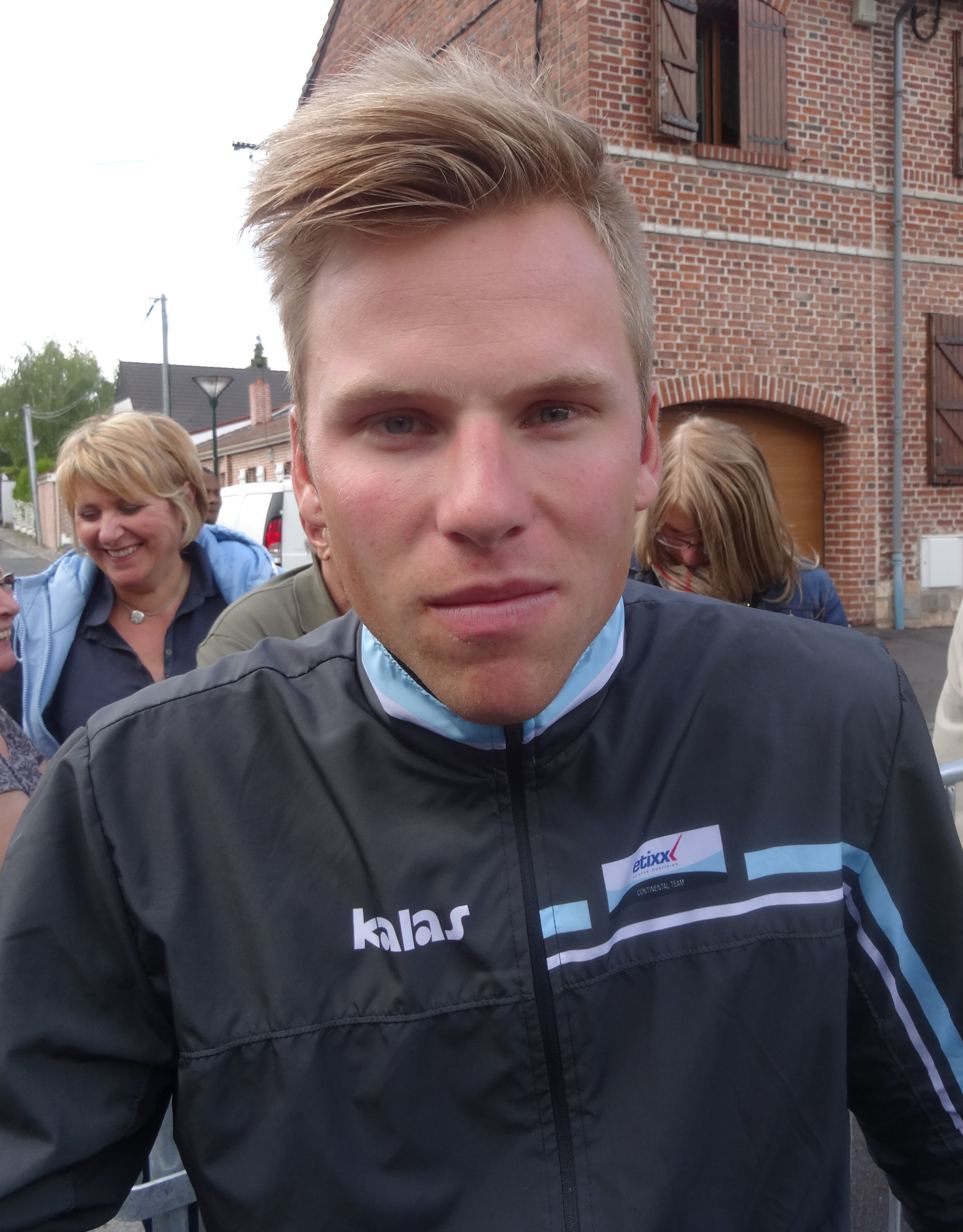
- Tim Kerkhof in 2014

Personal information
- Born: 13 November 1993 (age 32) Oss, Netherlands
- Height: 1.9 m (6 ft 3 in)
- Weight: 76 kg (168 lb)

Cycling career
- Sport: Cycling
- Current team: Retired
- Discipline: Road
- Role: Rider

Amateur teams
- 2012: Rucanor Line
- 2013: EFC–Omega Pharma–Quick Step

Professional teams
- 2014: Etixx
- 2015–2016: Team Roompot
- 2017–2018: Destil–Jo Piels

Tim Kerkhof (born 13 November 1993) is a Dutch former professional racing cyclist.

== Major results ==
2014
1st Road race, National Under–23 Road Championships
8th Ronde Van Vlaanderen Beloften
2015
1st Mountains classification Driedaagse van West–Vlaanderen
2016
5th Grand Prix Pino Cerami
2018
4th Arno Wallaard Memorial
7th Dwars door de Vlaamse Ardennen
7th Overall Flèche du Sud
