= Altanzulyn Altansükh =

Mongolian bicycle racer (born 1991)

Personal information
- Born: 12 December 1991 (age 34) Mörön, Mongolia

Cycling career
- Sport: Cycling
- Discipline: Road
- Role: Rider

Amateur team
- 2011: World Cycling Centre

Professional teams
- 2013: Malak Cycling Team
- 2014–2018: Ningxia Sports Lottery Cycling Team

Altanzulyn Altansükh (born 12 December 1991) is a Mongolian former professional cyclist, who rode professionally between 2013 and 2018.

== Major results ==
2009
National Junior Road Championships

1st Time trial
3rd Road race

National Road Championships

5th Time trial
8th Road race

2010
6th Road race, National Road Championships
2011
National Road Championships

1st Road race
2nd Time trial

2012
1st Overall Tour of Poyang Lake

1st Stage 2

2013
3rd Road race, East Asian Games
9th Tour of Nanjing
2014
3rd Time trial, National Road Championships
2015
National Road Championships

1st Road race
2nd Time trial

2016
6th Time trial, National Road Championships
2017
National Road Championships

1st Road race
8th Time trial

2018
4th Team time trial, Asian Road Championships
5th Road race, National Road Championships
