= Mikhail Timochine =

Russian cyclist

Personal information
- Born: 20 November 1980 (age 45) Moscow, Russia

Cycling career
- Sport: Cycling
- Current team: Retired
- Discipline: Road
- Role: Rider

Amateur team
- 2002: Landbouwkrediet–Colnago (stagiaire)

Professional teams
- 2003–2004: Landbouwkrediet–Colnago
- 2005: Omnibike Dynamo Moscow
- 2007: MapaMap–BantProfi
- 2008: Amore & Vita–McDonald's
- 2012: Uzbekistan Suren Team

Mikhail Timochine (born 20 November 1980) is a Russian former cyclist.

== Major results ==
2001
2nd Paris–Tours Espoirs
2002
1st Stage 2 Thüringen Rundfahrt der U23
1st Paris–Roubaix Espoirs
1st Overall GP Kranj

1st Stage 2

2nd Road race, European Under-23 Road Championships
2nd Overall Triptyque des Monts et Châteaux

1st Stage 2b

2nd Liège–Bastogne–Liège U23
3rd Giro del Belvedere
3rd Ronde van Vlaanderen U23
2004
2nd National Road Race Championships
2nd Uniqa Classic
4th Tallinn–Tartu GP
2005
3rd Tro-Bro Léon
3rd Tartu GP
