= Kseniia Tsymbalyuk =

Russian cyclist

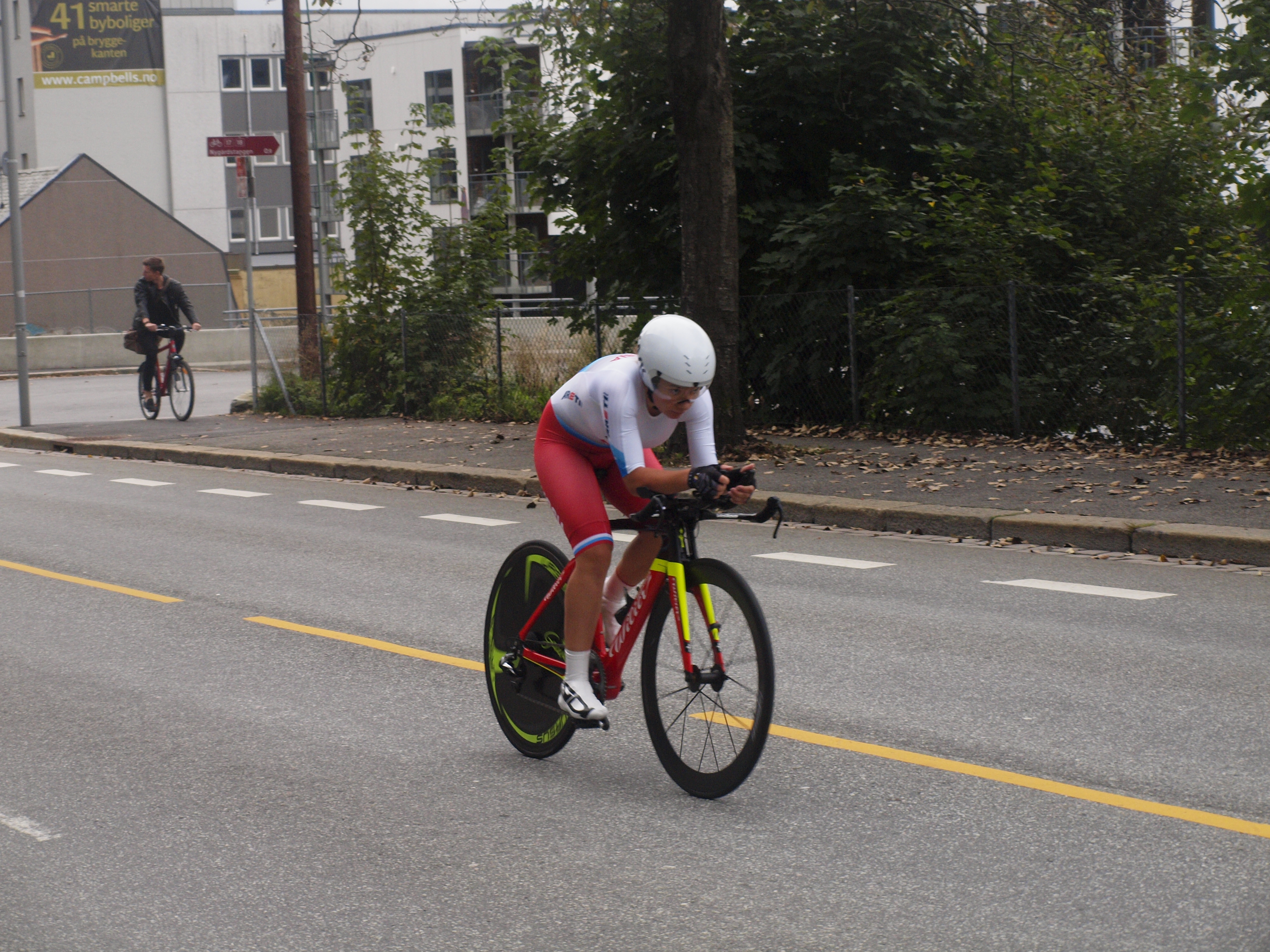
- Ksenia Tsymbaliuk at the 2017 UCI Road World Championships

Personal information
- Born: 8 January 1997 (age 29)

Cycling career
- Sport: Cycling
- Disciplines: Road and track cycling

Kseniia Tsymbalyuk (born 8 January 1997) is a Russian female road and track cyclist, representing Russia at international competitions. She competed at the 2016 UEC European Track Championships in the team pursuit event. At the 2017 UCI Road World Championships she rode in the women's time trial event.
