= Anastasiia Pliaskina =

Russian cyclist

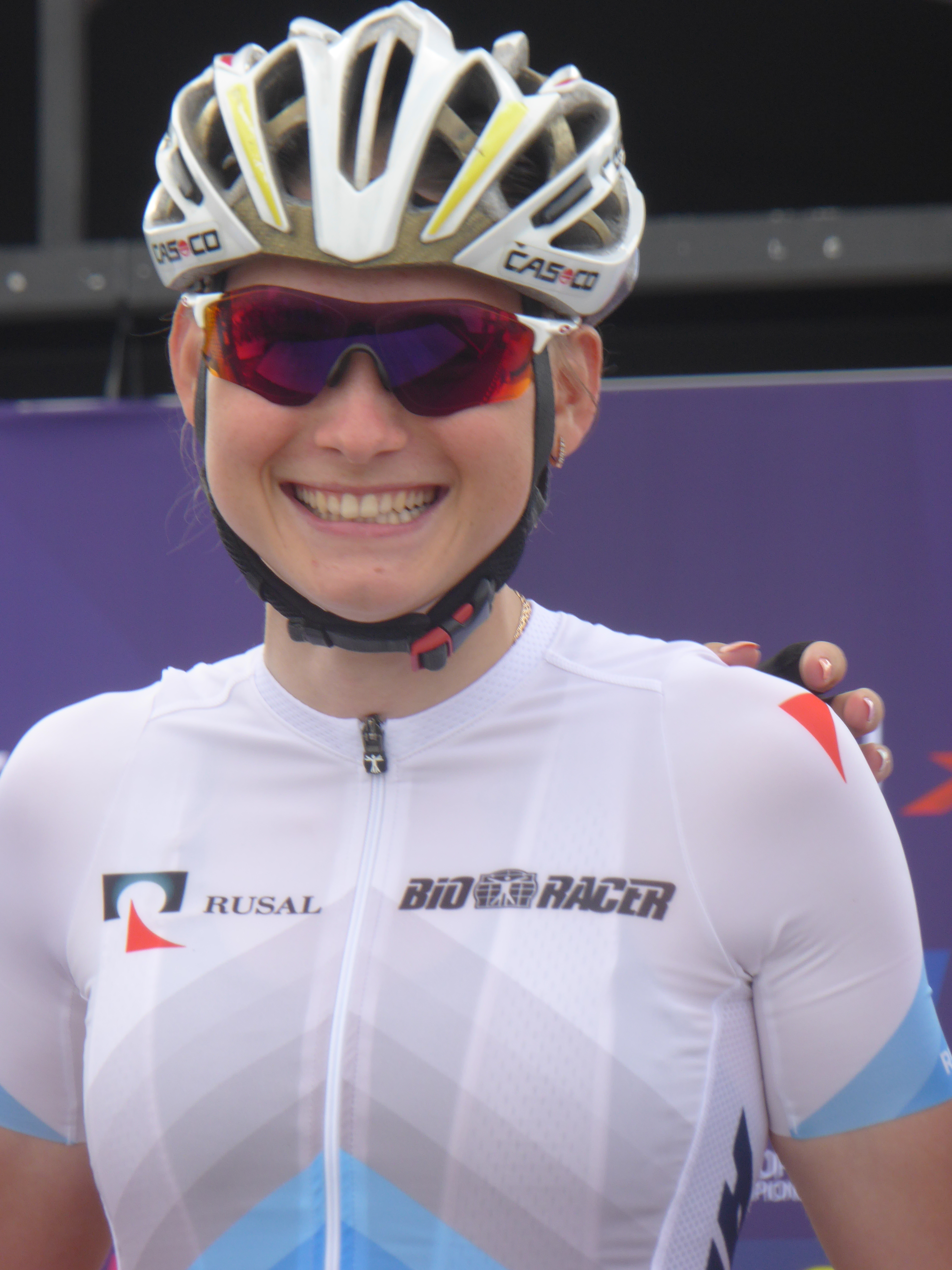
- Pliaskina at the 2018 European Road Cycling Championships.

Personal information
- Full name: Anastasiia Pliaskina
- Born: 21 February 1996 (age 30)

Cycling career
- Sport: Cycling
- Current team: Eneicat–CMTeam
- Discipline: Road
- Role: Rider

Professional teams
- 2019: Cogeas–Mettler–Look
- 2020–: Eneicat–RBH Global

Anastasiia Pliaskina (born 21 February 1996) is a Russian professional racing cyclist, who currently rides for UCI Women's Continental Team Eneicat–CMTeam.
