= Tour of Binzhou =

Annual cycling race in China

Race details
- Date: September
- Region: China
- Discipline: Road
- Competition: UCI Asia Tour (2023–)
- Type: Stage race (2023–2024); One-day race (2025–)

History
- First edition: 2023
- Editions: 3 (as of 2025)
- First winner: Lucas Carstensen (GER)
- Most wins: No repeat winners
- Most recent: Simon Pellaud (SUI)

The Tour of Binzhou is a single day road cycling race held annually in China. It is contested in September and is part of the UCI Asia Tour as 1.1 category event. Prior to 2025, the race was held over two days, holding a rating of 2.2.

== Winners ==
Year	Winner	Second	Third
2023	Lucas Carstensen (GER)	Luis Carlos Chía (COL)	Blake Agnoletto (AUS)
2024	Ilia Schegolkov	Ivan Yatsenko	Zhicheng Liu (CHN)
2025	Simon Pellaud (SUI)	Yukiya Arashiro (JPN)	Samuel Jenner (AUS)
