= Russian National Road Race Championships =

Cycling competition

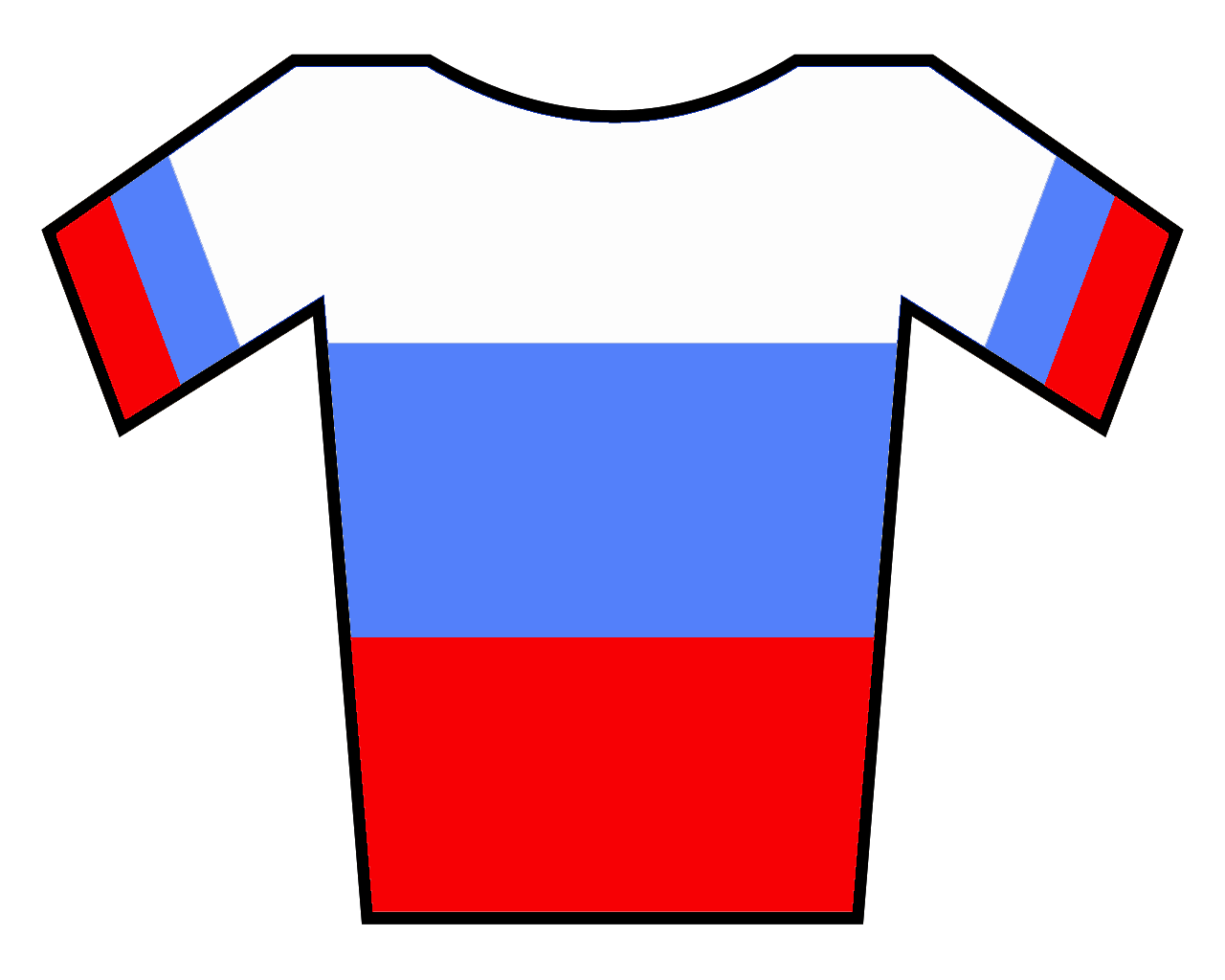
The champion's jersey

The Russian National Road Race Championships are cycling races that are held annually to determine the Russian cycling champion in road racing, across several categories of riders. The event was first held in 1992 and was won by Asiat Saitov. Sergei Ivanov holds the men's record of most victories with six.

== Multiple winners ==
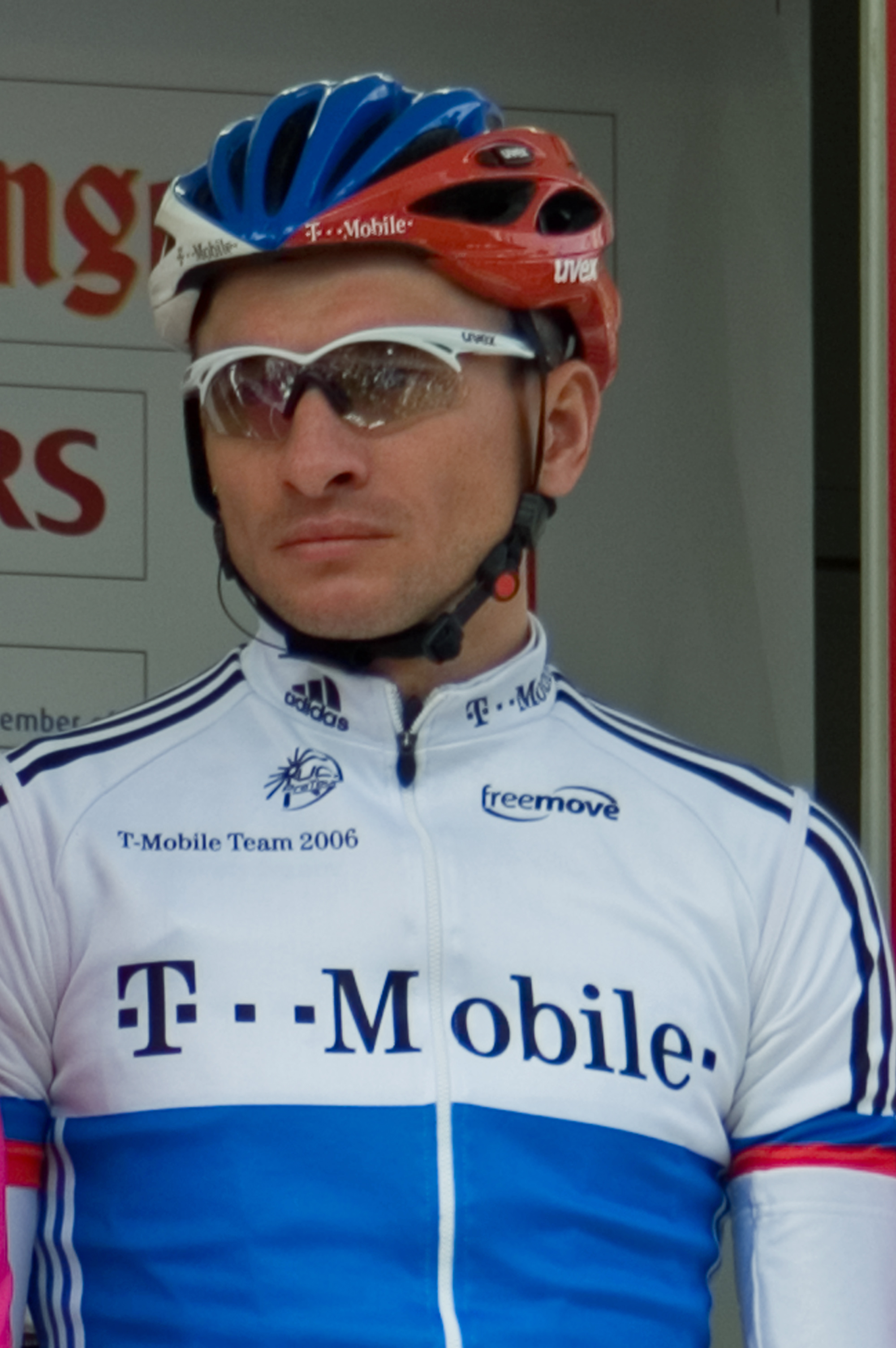
Sergei Ivanov has won the men's race on a record six occasions

Name	Wins	Years
Sergei Ivanov	6	1998, 1999, 2000, 2005, 2008, 2009
Asiat Saitov	2	1992, 1995
Dimitri Konyshev	2	1993, 2001
Alexandr Kolobnev	2	2004, 2010

== Men ==
=== Elite ===
Russian National Road Race Championships – Men's elite race
Race details
- Region: Russia
- Discipline: Road bicycle racing
- Type: One-day

History
- First edition: 1992
- First winner: Asiat Saitov
- Most wins: Sergei Ivanov (6 wins)
- Most recent: Petr Rikunov

Year	Gold	Silver	Bronze
1992	Asiat Saitov	Dimitri Konyshev	Alexander Timofeev
1993	Dimitri Konyshev	Asiat Saitov	Viatcheslav Ekimov
1994	Romes Gainetdinov	Aisar Gorgos	Aleksey Bochkov
1995	Asiat Saitov	Viatcheslav Djavanian	Andrei Zintchenko
1996	Vassili Davidenko	Dimitri Sedun	Dimitri Konyshev
1997	Viatcheslav Ekimov	Sergei Uslamin	Alexander Gontchenkov
1998	Sergei Ivanov	Piotr Ugrumov	Dimitri Konyshev
1999	Sergei Ivanov	Vassili Davidenko	Dimitri Sedun
2000	Sergei Ivanov	Pavel Tonkov	Alexei Sivakov
2001	Dimitri Konyshev	Alexei Markov	Denis Bondarenko
2002	Oleg Grishkin	Andrey Pchelkin	Dmitry Gaynitdinov
2003	Alexandre Bazhenov	Dimitri Dementiev	Oleg Zhukov
2004	Alexandr Kolobnev	Mikhail Timochine	Andrey Pchelkin
2005	Sergei Ivanov	Vladimir Gusev	Andrey Pchelkin
2006	Alexander Khatuntsev	Alexander Efimkin	Evgeni Petrov
2007	Vladislav Borisov	Sergey Kolesnikov	Yuri Trofimov
2008	Sergei Ivanov	Alexandre Bazhenov	Sergey Klimov
2009	Sergei Ivanov	Yuri Trofimov	Egor Silin
2010	Alexandr Kolobnev	Vladimir Gusev	Alexander Mironov
2011	Pavel Brutt	Eduard Vorganov	Yuri Trofimov
2012	Eduard Vorganov	Alexandr Kolobnev	Pavel Brutt
2013	Vladimir Isaichev	Vladimir Gusev	Andrey Solomennikov
2014	Alexander Porsev	Vladimir Gusev	Artur Ershov
2015	Yuri Trofimov	Pavel Brutt	Sergey Lagutin
2016	Pavel Kochetkov	Maxim Belkov	Sergey Lagutin
2017	Alexander Porsev	Artem Nych	Sergey Shilov
2018	Ivan Rovny	Alexander Porsev	Igor Frolov
2019	Aleksandr Vlasov	Igor Frolov	Mikhail Fokin
2020	Sergey Shilov	Igor Frolov	Nikita Martynov
2021	Artem Nych	Ilnur Zakarin	Ivan Rovny
2022	Petr Rikunov	Artem Nych	Mamyr Stash
2023	Andrei Stepanov	Yauheni Sobal	Aleksandr Bereznyak

=== U23 ===
Year	Gold	Silver	Bronze
2001	Mikhail Timochine	Vladimir Gusev	Alexandr Kolobnev
2002	Alexandre Bazhenov		
2003			
2004	Boris Shpilevsky	Dmitry Kozonchuk	Ivan Shchegolev
2005	Alexander Mironov	Yevgeni Popov	Yuri Trofimov
2006	Evgeny Sokolov		
2007			
2008	Sergey Valynin	Dmitriy Kosyakov	Sergey Shcherbakov
2009	Andrey Solomennikov	Alexander Serebryakov	Egor Silin
2010	Nikita Novikov	Matvey Zubov	Valery Kaykov
2011	Vyacheslav Kuznetsov	Matvey Zubov	Maxim Razumov
2012	Anton Vorobyev	Konstantin Kuperasov	Mikhail Akimov
2013	Roman Katyrin	Artur Shaymuratov	Gennady Tatarinov
2014	Ivan Savitskiy	Aleksandr Grigorev	Artem Nych
2015	Artem Nych	Nikolay Cherkasov	Aydar Zakarin
2016	Artem Nych	Pavel Sivakov	Sergey Rozin
2017	Petr Rikunov	Alexandr Kulikovskiy	Alexsandr Lobanov
2018	Aleksandr Vlasov	Petr Rikunov	Anton Popov
2019	Valerii Fatkullin	Igor Sidorov	Grigorii Sharov
2020	Not held due to the COVID-19 pandemic in Russia		
2021	Andrei Stepanov	Bogdan Gansevich	Anton Popov
2022	Denis Saveliev	Sergey Belyakov	Artem Gomozkov

== Women ==
Russian National Road Race Championships – Women's elite race
Race details
- Region: Russia
- Discipline: Road bicycle racing
- Type: One-day

History
- First edition: 1993
- First winner: Goulnara Fatkoulina
- Most wins: Svetlana Bubnenkova (5 wins)
- Most recent: Tamara Dronova

Year	Gold	Silver	Bronze
1993	Goulnara Fatkoulina	Svetlana Samokhvalova	Nadejda Pachkova
1994	Svetlana Samokhvalova	Svetlana Bubnenkova	Olga Sokolova
1995	Aleksandra Koliaseva	Valentina Polkhanova	Svetlana Samokhvalova
1996	Svetlana Bubnenkova	Zulfiya Zabirova	Aleksandra Koliaseva
1997	Tatjana Kaverina	Oksana Tontcheva	Valentina Gerasimova
1998	Svetlana Samokhvalova	Tatjana Kaverina	Svetlana Stepanova
1999	Youlia Razenkova	Valentina Gerasimova	Olga Slyusareva
2000	Svetlana Bubnenkova	Zulfiya Zabirova	Yuliya Martisova
2001	Elena Tchalykh	Svetlana Bubnenkova	Svetlana Samokhvalova
2002	Svetlana Bubnenkova	Valentina Polkhanova	Olga Slyusareva
2003	Svetlana Bubnenkova		
2004	Svetlana Bubnenkova	Olga Sliussareva	Yuliya Martisova
2005	Yuliya Martisova	Olga Slyusareva	Svetlana Bubnenkova
2006	Olga Slyusareva	Tatiana Panina	Elena Stramoysova
2007	Natalia Boyarskaya	Elena Gayun	Elena Kuchinskaya
2008	Yuliya Martisova	Yulia Blindyuk	Natalia Boyarskaya
2009	Yulia Ilinykh	Anna Evseeva	Tatiana Panina
2010	Tatiana Antoshina	Yuliya Martisova	Larisa Pankova
2011	Aizhan Zhaparova	Svetlana Bubnenkova	Larisa Pankova
2012	Yulia Blindyuk	Anna Potokina	Aizhan Zhaparova
2013	Svetlana Stolbova	Oxana Kozonchuk	Aizhan Zhaparova
2014	Tatiana Antoshina	Aizhan Zhaparova	Kseniya Dobrynina
2015	Anna Potokina	Anastasiia Ponetaikina	Daria Egorova
2016	Natalia Boyarskaya	Viktoria Grishechko	Oxana Kozonchuk
2017	Anastasiia Iakovenko	Karina Kasenova	Svetlana Kuznetsova Vasilieva
2018	Margarita Syradoeva	Anna Potokina	Elyzaveta Oshurkova
2019	Aleksandra Goncharova	Irina Ivanova	Anna Potokina
2020	Diana Klimova	Natalia Studenikina	Seda Krylova
2021	Seda Krylova	Daria Fomina	Tamara Dronova
2022	Tamara Dronova	Ekaterina Golovastova	Anastasia Pecherskikh
2023	Tamara Dronova	Valeria Valgonen	Marina Uvarova
