= Trans-Himalaya Cycling Race =

Annual cycling race in China

Race details
- Date: August
- Region: Tibet Autonomous Region, China
- Discipline: Road
- Competition: UCI Asia Tour
- Type: Stage race

History
- First edition: 2023
- Editions: 4 (as of 2026)
- First winner: Carlos Torres (VEN)
- Most wins: Raman Tsishkou (2)
- Most recent: Raman Tsishkou

The Trans-Himalaya Cycling Race is a multi-day road cycling race held annually in the Tibet Autonomous Region of China. First held in 2023, it is part of the UCI Asia Tour as a category 2.1 event.

== Winners ==
Year	Winner	Second	Third
2023	(Venezuela) Carlos Torres	(Australia) William Eaves	(China) Bai Lijun
2024	(New Zealand) Aaron Gate	Petr Rikunov	(Colombia) Luis Carlos Chía
2025	Raman Tsishkou	(Israel) Omer Goldstein	(Ukraine) Anatoliy Budyak
2026	Raman Tsishkou	(Italy) Alexander Konychev	Petr Rikunov
