= Tour of Poyang Lake =

Road cycling race in China

Race details
- Date: September
- Region: Jiangxi
- Discipline: Road
- Competition: UCI Asia Tour (2023–)
- Type: Stage race

History
- First edition: 2010
- Editions: 14 (as of 2026)
- First winner: Sergey Kudentsov (RUS)
- Most wins: Petr Rikunov (2 wins)
- Most recent: Alexander Konychev (ITA)

The Tour of Poyang Lake is a multi-day road cycling race held annually in China. It is contested in September near Lake Poyang, in the Jiangxi province. Created in 2010, it generally attracts a large number of riders from UCI Continental teams, and in 2023 became part of the UCI Asia Tour.

== Winners ==
Year	Winner	Second	Third
2010	(Russia) Sergey Kudentsov
2011	?
2012	(Mongolia) Altanzulyn Altansükh
2013	(Australia) Nicholas Graham-Dawson	(France) Julien Liponne	(Iran) Vahid Ghaffari
2014	(Australia) Ryan Cavanagh	(Netherlands) Sjoerd Kouwenhoven	(United States) Adam Farabaugh
2015	(Netherlands) Thomas Rabou	(Denmark) John Ebsen	(Netherlands) Sjoerd Kouwenhoven
2016	(Slovenia) Žiga Grošelj	(Netherlands) Maarten de Jonge	(Romania) Andrei Nechita
2017	(Germany) Nikodemus Holler	(France) Peter Pouly	(Kenya) Suleiman Kangangi
2018	(Netherlands) Maarten de Jonge	(Netherlands) Jasper Ockeloen	(Poland) Jarosław Marycz
2019	(Ukraine) Oleksandr Golovash	(United States) Sam Boardman	(Ukraine) Andriy Vasylyuk
2023	(China) Lyu Xianjing	(Poland) Jakub Kaczmarek	(Poland) Tomasz Budziński
2024	Petr Rikunov	(Australia) Kane Richards	Timofei Ivanov
2025	Petr Rikunov	(Germany) Oliver Mattheis	(Netherlands) Nils Sinschek
2026	(Italy) Alexander Konychev	(Poland) Michał Pomorski	(Germany) Jonas Rapp
