= 2015 RusVelo season =

RusVelo
- 2015 season
- UCI code: RVL
- Status: UCI Professional Continental
- Manager: Renat Khamidulin
- Main sponsor(s): Gazprom & Itera & Rostec
- Based: Russia
- Bicycles: Colnago

Season victories
- One-day races: 3
- Stage race overall: 2
- Stage race stages: 6
- National Championships: 1

The 2015 season for the RusVelo cycling team began in January at the Trofeo Santanyi-Ses Salines-Campos. The team participated in UCI Continental Circuits and UCI World Tour events when given a wildcard invitation.

== 2015 roster ==
Rider	Date of birth
Ildar Arslanov (RUS)	6 April 1994 (age 30)
Ivan Balykin (RUS)	26 November 1990 (age 34)
Igor Boev (RUS)	22 November 1988 (age 36)
Artur Ershov (RUS)	7 March 1990 (age 35)
Alexander Evtushenko (RUS)	30 June 1993 (age 31)
Sergey Firsanov (RUS)	3 July 1982 (age 42)
Alexander Foliforov (RUS)	8 March 1992 (age 33)
Petr Ignatenko (RUS)	27 September 1987 (age 37)
Aleksandr Komin (RUS)	12 April 1995 (age 29)

Rider	Date of birth
Roman Kustadinchev (RUS)	3 August 1995 (age 29)
Roman Maikin (RUS)	14 August 1990 (age 34)
Artem Nych (RUS)	21 March 1995 (age 29)
Artem Ovechkin (RUS)	11 July 1986 (age 38)
Kirill Pozdnyakov (RUS)	20 January 1989 (age 36)
Alexander Rybakov (RUS)	17 May 1988 (age 36)
Alexander Serov (RUS)	12 November 1982 (age 42)
Andrey Solomennikov (RUS)	10 June 1987 (age 37)
Mamyr Stash (RUS)	4 May 1993 (age 31)

Riders who joined the team for the 2015 season

Rider	2014 team
Ildar Arslanov	neo-pro (Itera-Katusha)
Alexander Evtushenko	neo-pro (Russian Helicopters)
Alexander Foliforov	neo-pro (Itera-Katusha)
Petr Ignatenko	Team Katusha
Aleksandr Komin	neo-pro (Russian Helicopters)
Roman Kustadinchev	neo-pro (Russian Helicopters)
Artem Nych	neo-pro (Russian Helicopters)
Alexander Rybakov	Team Katusha
Mamyr Stash	neo-pro (Itera-Katusha)

Riders who left the team during or after the 2014 season

Rider	2015 team
Serguei Klimov	
Leonid Krasnov	
Timofey Kritsky	
Sergey Lagutin	Team Katusha
Sergey Pomoshnikov	Itera–Katusha
Gennady Tatarinov	
Ilnur Zakarin	Team Katusha

== Season victories ==
Date	Race	Competition	Rider	Country	Location
18 March	Grand Prix of Sochi Mayor	UCI Europe Tour	Sergey Firsanov (RUS)	Russia	Sochi
22 March	Grand Prix of Sochi, Stage 4	UCI Europe Tour	Alexander Foliforov (RUS)	Russia	Mount Akhun
22 March	Grand Prix of Sochi, Overall	UCI Europe Tour	Alexander Foliforov (RUS)	Russia	
22 March	Grand Prix of Sochi, Teams classification	UCI Europe Tour	(Note: The riders on the squad were Sergey Firsanov, Ivan Balykin, Alexander Foliforov, Artem Nych, Artem Ovechkin and Andrey Solomennikov)	Russia	
1 April	Krasnodar–Anapa	UCI Europe Tour	Andrey Solomennikov (RUS)	Russia	Anapa
5 April	Tour of Kuban, Stage 3	UCI Europe Tour	Roman Maikin (RUS)	Russia	Krasnodar
5 April	Tour of Kuban, Points classification	UCI Europe Tour	Roman Maikin (RUS)	Russia	
15 April	Maykop–Ulyap–Maykop	UCI Europe Tour	Ivan Balykin (RUS)	Russia	Maykop
18 April	Grand Prix of Adygeya, Stage 2	UCI Europe Tour	Sergey Firsanov (RUS)	Russia	Guzeripl
19 April	Grand Prix of Adygeya, Overall	UCI Europe Tour	Sergey Firsanov (RUS)	Russia	
9 May	Five Rings of Moscow, Teams classification	UCI Europe Tour	(Note: The riders on the squad were Ivan Balykin, Igor Boev, Roman Maikin, Artem Nych, Alexander Rybakov and Andrey Solomennikov)	Russia	
10 May	Tour d'Azerbaïdjan, Stage 5	UCI Europe Tour	Sergey Firsanov (RUS)	Azerbaijan	Baku
18 June	Tour of Slovenia, Stage 1	UCI Europe Tour	Artem Ovechkin (RUS)	Slovenia	Ljubljana
8 July	Tour of Qinghai Lake, Stage 4	UCI Asia Tour	Ivan Savitskiy (RUS)	China	Gangca County

== National, Continental and World champions 2015 ==
Date	Discipline	Jersey	Rider	Country	Location
26 June	Russian National Time Trial Champion		Artem Ovechkin (RUS)	Russia	Saransk
