= 2014 RusVelo season =

2014 RusVelo season
Manager	Renat Khamidulin
One-day victories	3
Stage race overall victories	6
Stage race stage victories	13
Previous season • Next season

The 2014 season for the RusVelo cycling team began in February at the Volta ao Algarve. The team participated in UCI Continental Circuits and UCI World Tour events when given a wildcard invitation.

== 2014 roster ==
As of 5 February 2014.

Rider	Date of birth
Ivan Balykin (RUS)	26 November 1990 (age 34)
Igor Boev (RUS)	22 November 1988 (age 36)
Artur Ershov (RUS)	7 March 1990 (age 35)
Sergey Firsanov (RUS)	3 July 1982 (age 42)
Sergey Klimov (RUS)	7 July 1980 (age 44)
Leonid Krasnov (RUS)	24 January 1988 (age 37)
Timofey Kritsky (RUS)	24 January 1987 (age 38)
Sergey Lagutin (RUS)	14 January 1981 (age 44)

Rider	Date of birth
Roman Maikin (RUS)	14 August 1990 (age 34)
Artem Ovechkin (RUS)	11 July 1986 (age 38)
Sergey Pomoshnikov (RUS)	17 July 1990 (age 34)
Kirill Pozdnyakov (RUS)	20 January 1989 (age 36)
Alexander Serov (RUS)	12 November 1982 (age 42)
Andrey Solomennikov (RUS)	10 June 1987 (age 37)
Gennady Tatarinov (RUS)	20 April 1991 (age 33)
Ilnur Zakarin (RUS)	15 September 1989 (age 35)

Riders who joined the team for the 2014 season

Rider	2013 team
Ivan Balykin	neo-pro (Podenzano)
Timofey Kritsky	Team Katusha
Sergey Lagutin	Vacansoleil–DCM
Kirill Pozdnyakov	neo-pro (Synergy Baku)

Riders who left the team during or after the 2013 season

Rider	2014 team
Valery Kaykov	Sacked
Pavel Kochetkov	Team Katusha
Evgeny Kovalev	Russian Helicopters
Ivan Kovalev	Russian Helicopters
Victor Manakov	Itera–Katusha
Alexander Mironov	
Alexander Rybakov	Team Katusha
Ivan Savitskiy	Russian Helicopters
Nikolay Zhurkin	Russian Helicopters

== Season victories ==
Date	Race	Competition	Rider	Country	Location
1 April	Grand Prix of Sochi, Stage 1	UCI Europe Tour	Sergey Lagutin (RUS)	Russia	Anapa
2 April	Grand Prix of Sochi, Stage 2	UCI Europe Tour	Roman Maikin (RUS)	Russia	Anapa
6 April	Grand Prix of Sochi, Overall	UCI Europe Tour	Ilnur Zakarin (RUS)	Russia	
6 April	Grand Prix of Sochi, Points classification	UCI Europe Tour	Roman Maikin (RUS)	Russia	
6 April	Grand Prix of Sochi, Teams classification	UCI Europe Tour	(Note: The riders on the squad were Ilnur Zakarin, Sergey Lagutin, Roman Maikin, Andrey Solomennikov, Igor Boev and Timofey Kritsky)	Russia	
16 April	Grand Prix of Adygeya, Stage 1	UCI Europe Tour	Ilnur Zakarin (RUS)	Russia	Pobeda
17 April	Grand Prix of Adygeya, Stage 2	UCI Europe Tour	Igor Boev (RUS)	Russia	Maykop
20 April	Grand Prix of Adygeya, Stage 5	UCI Europe Tour	Igor Boev (RUS)	Russia	Maykop
20 April	Grand Prix of Adygeya, Overall	UCI Europe Tour	Ilnur Zakarin (RUS)	Russia	
20 April	Grand Prix of Adygeya, Points classification	UCI Europe Tour	Igor Boev (RUS)	Russia	
20 April	Grand Prix of Adygeya, Teams classification	UCI Europe Tour	(Note: The riders on the squad were Ilnur Zakarin, Sergey Lagutin, Sergey Firsanov, Artur Ershov, Igor Boev and Sergey Klimov)	Russia	
1 May	Mayor Cup	UCI Europe Tour	Sergey Lagutin (RUS)	Russia	Moscow
2 May	Memorial Oleg Dyachenko	UCI Europe Tour	Andrey Solomennikov (RUS)	Russia	Moscow
3 May	Grand Prix of Moscow	UCI Europe Tour	Leonid Krasnov (RUS)	Russia	Moscow
7 May	Five Rings of Moscow, Stage 2	UCI Europe Tour	Igor Boev (RUS)	Russia	Moscow
8 May	Five Rings of Moscow, Stage 3	UCI Europe Tour	Sergey Lagutin (RUS)	Russia	Moscow
9 May	Five Rings of Moscow, Stage 4	UCI Europe Tour	Igor Boev (RUS)	Russia	Moscow
9 May	Five Rings of Moscow, Overall	UCI Europe Tour	Andrey Solomennikov (RUS)	Russia	Moscow
9 May	Five Rings of Moscow, Points classification	UCI Europe Tour	Igor Boev (RUS)	Russia	
9 May	Five Rings of Moscow, Teams classification	UCI Europe Tour	(Note: The riders on the squad were Andrey Solomennikov, Sergey Lagutin, Ivan Balykin, Sergey Klimov, Igor Boev and Roman Maikin)	Russia	
11 June	GP Udmurtskaya Pravda, Stage 1	UCI Europe Tour	Timofey Kritsky (RUS)	Russia	Izhevsk
14 June	GP Udmurtskaya Pravda, Stage 4	UCI Europe Tour	Artur Ershov (RUS)	Russia	Izhevsk
15 June	GP Udmurtskaya Pravda, Overall	UCI Europe Tour	Artur Ershov (RUS)	Russia	
15 June	GP Udmurtskaya Pravda, Mountains classification	UCI Europe Tour	Ivan Balykin (RUS)	Russia	
15 June	GP Udmurtskaya Pravda, Teams classification	UCI Europe Tour	(Note: The riders on the squad were Artur Ershov, Sergey Klimov, Ivan Balykin, Sergey Pomoshnikov, Timofey Kritsky and Leonid Krasnov)	Russia	
12 July	Tour of Qinghai Lake, Stage 7	UCI Asia Tour	Timofey Kritsky (RUS)	China	Hualong
3 October	Tour of Kavkaz, Stage 2	UCI Europe Tour	Igor Boev (RUS)	Russia	Maykop
5 October	Tour of Kavkaz, Stage 4	UCI Europe Tour	Sergey Firsanov (RUS)	Russia	Guzeripl
6 October	Tour of Kavkaz, Overall	UCI Europe Tour	Sergey Firsanov (RUS)	Russia	
6 October	Tour of Kavkaz, Mountains classification	UCI Europe Tour	Igor Boev (RUS)	Russia	
6 October	Tour of Kavkaz, Teams classification	UCI Europe Tour	(Note: The riders on the squad were Roman Maikin, Igor Boev, Sergey Firsanov, Alexander Serov, Timofey Kritsky and Artur Ershov)	Russia	
