= Matvey Zubov =

Russian bicycle racer

Personal information
- Full name: Matvey Sergeyevich Zubov
- Born: 22 January 1991 (age 35) Krasnoyarsk, Russian SFSR, Soviet Union

Cycling career
- Sport: Cycling
- Current team: Moscow Region
- Disciplines: Road; Track
- Role: Rider

Amateur teams
- 2015–2017: MGFSO
- 2018: Ind-Russia
- 2019: Dynamo Moscow
- 2020–: Moscow Region

Professional teams
- 2010: Katyusha Continental Team
- 2012: RusVelo
- 2013: Itera–Katusha
- 2014: Russian Helicopters

Matvey Sergeyevich Zubov (Russian: Матвей Сергеевич Зубов; born 22 January 1991) is a Russian cyclist.

== Major results ==
2009
UCI Juniors Track World Championships

1st Team pursuit (with Konstantin Kuperasov, Viktor Manakov and Ivan Savitskiy)
3rd Points race

1st Team pursuit, UEC European Junior Track Championships (with Konstantin Kuperasov, Viktor Manakov and Ivan Savitskiy)
1st Stage 2 Course de la Paix Juniors
10th Time trial, UCI Juniors World Championships
2011
2nd Road race, National Under-23 Road Championships
2012
1st Team pursuit, UEC European Under-23 Track Championships (with Nikolay Zhurkin, Ivan Savitskiy and Viktor Manakov)
2013
10th Overall Five Rings of Moscow
2014
5th Memorial Oleg Dyachenko
8th Overall Baltic Chain Tour
9th Overall Grand Prix of Sochi
2015
1st Stage 4 Five Rings of Moscow
2017
1st Stage 2 Five Rings of Moscow
