= 2014 UCI Road World Championships – Men's under-23 road race =

Men's under-23 road race
2014 UCI Road World Championships
- Rainbow jersey

Race details
- Dates: 26 September 2014
- Stages: 1
- Distance: 182.00 km (113.09 mi)
- Winning time: 4h 32' 39"

Medalists
	Gold	Sven Erik Bystrøm (NOR)
	Silver	Caleb Ewan (AUS)
	Bronze	Kristoffer Skjerping (NOR)

The Men's under-23 road race of the 2014 UCI Road World Championships took place in and around Ponferrada, Spain on 26 September 2014. The course of the race was 182.00 km (113.09 mi) with the start and finish in Ponferrada.

Following on from countryman Kurt Asle Arvesen in 1997, Sven Erik Bystrøm became only the second Norwegian rider to win the world title. He made a late break on the final climb, with around 5 km (3.1 mi) remaining, and held off the peloton; he ultimately soloed to victory by seven seconds. Australia's Caleb Ewan won the field sprint for the silver medal, while Bystrøm's teammate Kristoffer Skjerping completed the podium with the bronze medal.

== Qualification ==
Qualification was based on performances on the UCI run tours and the Men Under 23 Nations' Cup during 2014. Results from January to the middle of August counted towards the qualification criteria. In addition to this number, the current continental champions were also able to take part. The outgoing World Champion, Matej Mohorič, did not compete as he was no longer eligible – he moved to the UCI ProTeam Cannondale for the 2014 season.

Number of riders	Nations
11 to enter, 6 to start	Australia, Colombia, Kazakhstan, Switzerland
10 to enter, 5 to start	Costa Rica, Denmark, Eritrea, Spain, Malaysia, Netherlands, France, Italy, Belgium, Germany, United Kingdom, Norway, Russia, Austria, Romania, Turkey, United States, Poland, Slovenia
8 to enter, 4 to start	Albania, Portugal, Slovakia, Georgia, Bosnia and Herzegovina, Iran, Macau, Guatemala, Chile, South Africa, Venezuela
6 to enter, 3 to start	New Zealand, Latvia, Ireland, Azerbaijan, Moldova, Belarus, Serbia, Hong Kong, South Korea, India, Brazil, Mexico, Jamaica, Puerto Rico, Morocco, Algeria, Rwanda, Nations qualified via the Men Under 23 Nations' Cup
2 to enter, 1 to start	Bulgaria, Ecuador, Greece, Serbia, Sweden

== Course ==
The race was held on the same circuit as the other road races and consisted of ten laps. The circuit was 18.20 km (11.31 mi) long and included two hills. The total climbing was 306 m (1,004 ft) per lap and the maximum incline was 10.7%.

The first 4 km (2.5 mi) were flat, after which the climb to Alto de Montearenas started, with an average gradient of 8%. After a few hundred metres the ascent flattened and the remaining 5.1 km (3.2 mi) were at an average gradient of 3.5%. Next was a descent, with the steepest point after 11 km (6.8 mi) at a 16% negative gradient.

The Alto de Compostilla was a short climb of 1.1 km (0.68 mi), at an average gradient is 6.5% with some of the steepest parts at 11%. The remaining distance of 4.5 km (2.8 mi) was downhill thereafter, prior to the finish in Ponferrada.

== Schedule ==
All times are in Central European Time (UTC+1).

Date	Time	Event
26 September 2014	13:00–17:40	Men's under-23 road race
26 September 2014	18:00	Victory ceremony

== Participating nations ==
162 cyclists from 42 nations took part in the men's under-23 road race. The number of cyclists per nation is shown in parentheses.

- Albania (2)
- Algeria (3)
- Australia (6)
- Austria (5)
- Azerbaijan (3)
- Belgium (6)
- Belarus (2)
- Brazil (2)
- Chile (2)
- Colombia (6)
- Costa Rica (1)
- Denmark (5)
- Eritrea (5)
- Finland (1)
- France (6)
- (United Kingdom) Great Britain (5)
- Germany (5)
- (Republic of Ireland) Ireland (3)
- Italy (5)
- Kazakhstan (6)
- Latvia (1)
- Luxembourg (3)
- Morocco (3)
- Moldova (1)
- Mexico (3)
- Netherlands (5)
- Norway (6)
- New Zealand (2)
- Poland (5)
- Portugal (4)
- Romania (2)
- Russia (6)
- Rwanda (3)
- Serbia (1)
- Slovakia (4)
- Slovenia (5)
- South Africa (4)
- Spain (5) (host)
- Switzerland (6)
- Turkey (5)
- United States (5)
- Venezuela (4)

== Prize money ==
The UCI assigned premiums for the top 3 finishers with a total prize money of €8,049.

Position	1st	2nd	3rd	Total
Amount	€3,833	€2,683	€1,533	€8,049

== Final classification ==
Of the race's 162 entrants, 120 riders completed the full distance of 182 km (113.1 mi).

Rank	Rider	Country	Time
1	Sven Erik Bystrøm	Norway	4h 32' 39"
2	Caleb Ewan	Australia	+ 7"
3	Kristoffer Skjerping	Norway	+ 7"
4	Tiesj Benoot	Belgium	+ 7"
5	Sondre Holst Enger	Norway	+ 7"
6	Iuri Filosi	Italy	+ 7"
7	Hernando Bohórquez	Colombia	+ 7"
8	Ilya Davidenok	Kazakhstan	+ 7"
9	Silvio Herklotz	Germany	+ 7"
10	Mathieu van der Poel	Netherlands	+ 7"
11	Dion Smith	New Zealand	+ 7"
12	Fabian Lienhard	Switzerland	+ 7"
13	Tanner Putt	United States	+ 7"
14	Timo Roosen	Netherlands	+ 7"
15	Luka Pibernik	Slovenia	+ 7"
16	Joaquim Silva	Portugal	+ 7"
17	Odd Christian Eiking	Norway	+ 7"
18	Miguel Ángel Benito	Spain	+ 7"
19	Owain Doull	Great Britain	+ 7"
20	Fernando Gaviria	Colombia	+ 7"
21	Mike Teunissen	Netherlands	+ 7"
22	Magnus Cort	Denmark	+ 7"
23	Artem Nych	Russia	+ 7"
24	Markus Hoelgaard	Norway	+ 7"
25	Merhawi Kudus	Eritrea	+ 7"
26	Miguel Ángel López	Colombia	+ 7"
27	Thomas Boudat	France	+ 7"
28	Louis Meintjes	South Africa	+ 7"
29	Dylan Teuns	Belgium	+ 7"
30	Sam Oomen	Netherlands	+ 7"
31	James Oram	New Zealand	+ 7"
32	Sindre Lunke	Norway	+ 7"
33	Jasper De Buyst	Belgium	+ 7"
34	Scott Davies	Great Britain	+ 7"
35	Robbie Power	Australia	+ 7"
36	Brayan Ramírez	Colombia	+ 7"
37	Gregor Mühlberger	Austria	+ 7"
38	Loïc Vliegen	Belgium	+ 7"
39	Floris De Tier	Belgium	+ 7"
40	Mikel Iturria	Spain	+ 20"
41	Emanuel Buchmann	Germany	+ 22"
42	Luca Chirico	Italy	+ 36"
43	Simon Pellaud	Switzerland	+ 42"
44	Anasse Ait El Abdia	Morocco	+ 42"
45	Oleg Zemlyakov	Kazakhstan	+ 42"
46	Rafael Reis	Portugal	+ 1' 03"
47	Bakhtiyar Kozhatayev	Kazakhstan	+ 1' 03"
48	Felix Großschartner	Austria	+ 1' 03"
49	Mario González	Spain	+ 1' 03"
50	Michael Carbel	Denmark	+ 1' 11"
51	Gianni Moscon	Italy	+ 1' 13"
52	Luis Lemus	Mexico	+ 2' 01"
53	Federico Zurlo	Italy	+ 2' 01"
54	Roniel Campos	Venezuela	+ 2' 01"
55	Yonder Godoy	Venezuela	+ 2' 01"
56	Alexander Foliforov	Russia	+ 2' 01"
57	Robin Carpenter	United States	+ 2' 31"
58	Caio Godoy	Brazil	+ 2' 31"
59	Alexey Vermeulen	United States	+ 2' 48"
60	Nikaj Iltjan	Albania	+ 3' 46"
61	Lukas Spengler	Switzerland	+ 3' 46"
62	Davide Martinelli	Italy	+ 3' 46"
63	Ryan Mullen	Ireland	+ 3' 46"
64	Mario Vogt	Germany	+ 3' 46"
65	Théry Schir	Switzerland	+ 3' 46"
66	Marc Soler	Spain	+ 3' 46"
67	Jack Haig	Australia	+ 3' 46"
68	Maxat Ayazbayev	Kazakhstan	+ 3' 46"
69	Quentin Jaurégui	France	+ 3' 46"
70	Jérémy Leveau	France	+ 3' 46"
71	Michael Gogl	Austria	+ 3' 46"
72	Conor Dunne	Ireland	+ 5' 11"
73	Krists Neilands	Latvia	+ 6' 10"
74	Logan Owen	United States	+ 6' 10"
75	Ruben Guerreiro	Portugal	+ 6' 10"
76	Aleksey Rybalkin	Russia	+ 6' 10"
77	Miloš Borisavljević	Serbia	+ 6' 10"
78	Sam Spokes	Australia	+ 8' 34"
79	Kevin Ledanois	France	+ 8' 42"
80	Ricardo Ferreira	Portugal	+ 9' 18"
81	Jan Dieteren	Germany	+ 9' 18"

Rank	Rider	Country	Time
82	Alex Kirsch	Luxembourg	+ 10' 34"
83	Stefan Küng	Switzerland	+ 10' 34"
84	Erik Baška	Slovakia	+ 10' 34"
85	Arkadiusz Owsian	Poland	+ 10' 34"
86	Aliaksandr Riabushenko	Belarus	+ 10' 34"
87	Sebastian Schönberger	Austria	+ 11' 48"
88	Roman Kustadinchev	Russia	+ 11' 48"
89	Metkel Eyob	Eritrea	+ 11' 48"
90	Samir Jabrayilov	Azerbaijan	+ 11' 48"
91	Gasper Katrasnik	Slovenia	+ 11' 48"
92	Bartosz Warchoł	Poland	+ 11' 48"
93	Lukas Pöstlberger	Austria	+ 11' 48"
94	Matej Razingar	Slovenia	+ 11' 48"
95	Aleksandr Komin	Russia	+ 11' 48"
96	Pierre-Roger Latour	France	+ 11' 48"
97	Ignacio Prado	Mexico	+ 11' 48"
98	Domen Novak	Slovenia	+ 11' 48"
99	Carlos Ramírez	Colombia	+ 11' 48"
100	Przemysław Kasperkiewicz	Poland	+ 11' 48"
101	Jack Wilson	Ireland	+ 11' 48"
102	Ruben Zepuntke	Germany	+ 11' 48"
103	Tao Geoghegan Hart	Great Britain	+ 11' 48"
104	Lennard Hofstede	Netherlands	+ 11' 48"
105	Alex Peters	Great Britain	+ 11' 48"
106	Matti Manninen	Finland	+ 11' 48"
107	Søren Kragh Andersen	Denmark	+ 11' 48"
108	Vadim Galeyev	Kazakhstan	+ 11' 54"
109	Meron Teshome	Eritrea	+ 18' 24"
110	Rok Korošec	Slovenia	+ 19' 07"
111	Serkan Balkan	Turkey	+ 20' 24"
112	Jeison Vega	Costa Rica	+ 20' 24"
113	Nikolai Shumov	Belarus	+ 20' 47"
114	Willem Smit	South Africa	+ 20' 47"
115	Salah Eddine Mraouni	Morocco	+ 20' 47"
116	Abderrahmane Mansouri	Algeria	+ 21' 27"
117	Abdenour Yahmi	Algeria	+ 21' 27"
118	Jayde Julius	South Africa	+ 27' 00"
119	Kevin Patte	South Africa	+ 27' 00"
120	Valens Ndayisenga	Rwanda	+ 27' 00"
	Sebastián Molano	Colombia	DNF
	Campbell Flakemore	Australia	DNF
	Gerardo Medina	Mexico	DNF
	Alex Clements	Australia	DNF
	Loïc Chetout	France	DNF
	Luc Turchi	Luxembourg	DNF
	Carlos Giménez	Venezuela	DNF
	Piotr Brożyna	Poland	DNF
	Imanol Estévez	Spain	DNF
	Daniel McLay	Great Britain	DNF
	Tilegen Maidos	Kazakhstan	DNF
	Tom Bohli	Switzerland	DNF
	Fatih Keleş	Turkey	DNF
	Mario Dasko	Slovakia	DNF
	Evgeny Shalunov	Russia	DNF
	Eryk Latoń	Poland	DNF
	Kevin Feiereisen	Luxembourg	DNF
	Tyler Williams	United States	DNF
	Aron Debretsion	Eritrea	DNF
	Mads Pedersen	Denmark	DNF
	José Luis Rodríguez	Chile	DNF
	Enver Asanov	Azerbaijan	DNF
	Andrés Soto	Venezuela	DNF
	Jean Bosco Nsengimana	Rwanda	DNF
	Ľuboš Malovec	Slovakia	DNF
	Tural Isgandarov	Azerbaijan	DNF
	Amanuel Gebregziabher	Eritrea	DNF
	Asbjørn Kragh Andersen	Denmark	DNF
	Ahmet Örken	Turkey	DNF
	Kenneth Van Rooy	Belgium	DNF
	Eduard-Michael Grosu	Romania	DNF
	Carlos Henrique dos Santos	Brazil	DNF
	Xhuliano Kamberaj	Albania	DNF
	Adil Barbari	Algeria	DNF
	Bonaventure Uwizeyimana	Rwanda	DNF
	Othmane Choumouch	Morocco	DNF
	Feritcan Şamlı	Turkey	DNF
	Szabolcs Sebestyén	Romania	DNF
	Victor Cartin	Moldova	DNF
	Juraj Lajcha	Slovakia	DNF
	Rasim Reis	Turkey	DNF
	Carlos Olivares	Chile	DNF
