= Ivan Savitskiy =

Russian bicycle racer

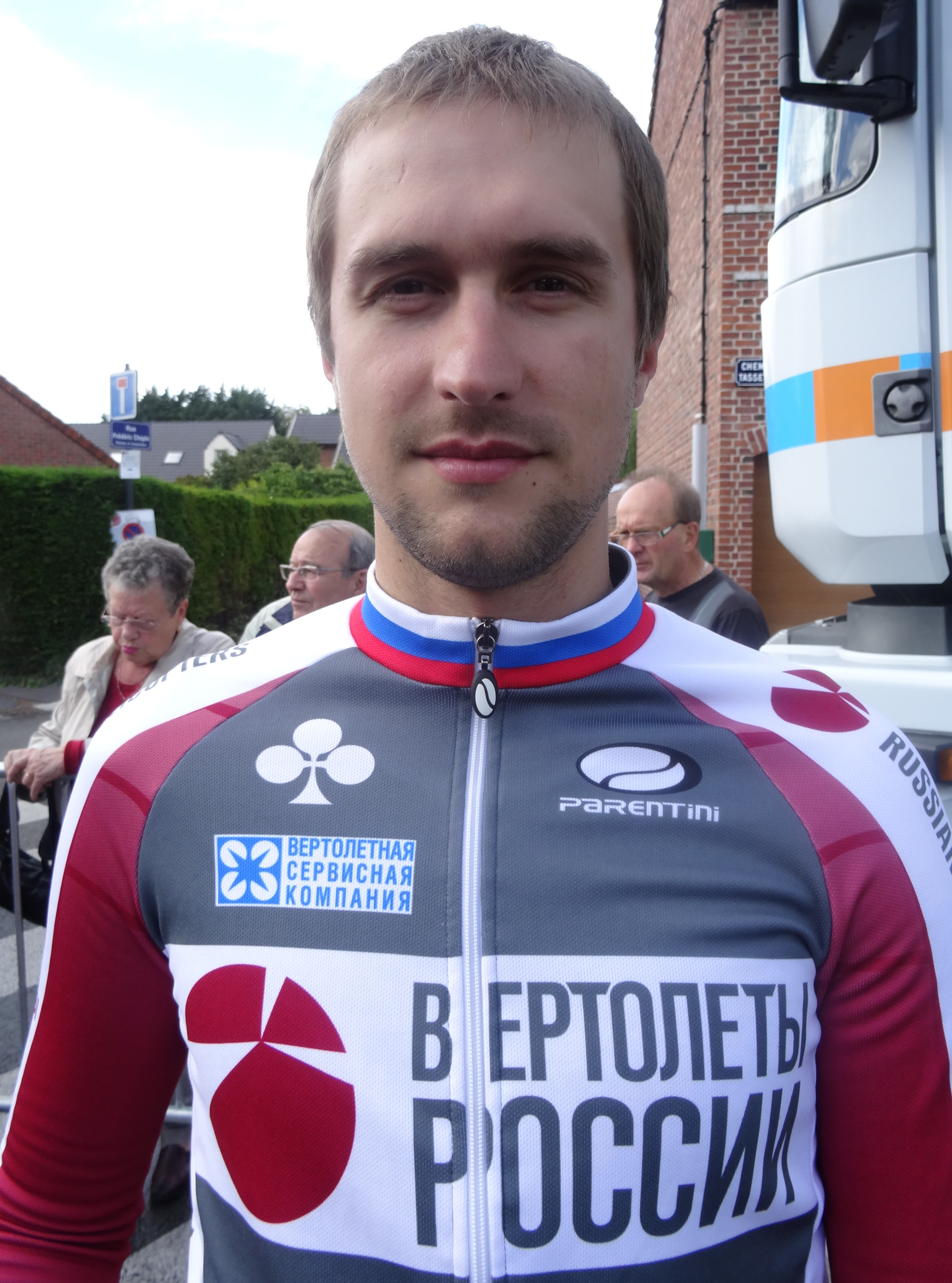
- Savitskiy in 2014.

Personal information
- Full name: Ivan Alexandrovich Savitskiy; Иван Александрович Савицкий
- Born: 6 March 1992 (age 34) Grozny, Russia

Cycling career
- Sport: Cycling
- Disciplines: Road; Track
- Role: Rider

Professional teams
- 2012–2013: RusVelo
- 2014: Russian Helicopters
- 2015–2017: RusVelo

Ivan Alexandrovich Savitskiy (Russian: Иван Александрович Савицкий; born 6 March 1992 in Grozny) is a Russian former professional cyclist, who rode professionally between 2012 and 2017 for the Russian Helicopters and Gazprom–RusVelo teams. On the track he represented the national team. He competed in the scratch event at the 2012 UCI Track Cycling World Championships. He was named in the start list for the 2016 Giro d'Italia.

== Major results ==
2009
UCI Juniors Track World Championships

1st Team pursuit
3rd Individual pursuit

UEC European Junior Track Championships

1st Team pursuit
2nd Individual pursuit

6th Paris–Roubaix Juniors
2012
UEC European Under-23 Track Championships

1st Team pursuit
3rd Points race

3rd Time trial, National Under-23 Road Championships
2013
1st Team pursuit, 2012–13 UCI Track Cycling World Cup, Aguascalientes
2nd Overall Baltic Chain Tour

1st Young rider classification

3rd Madison, UEC European Under-23 Track Championships
2014
1st Road race, National Under-23 Road Championships
2015
1st Overall Tour de Serbie

1st Points classification
1st Stages 1, 2 & 4

1st Stage 4 Tour of Qinghai Lake
2nd Overall Grand Prix of Sochi

1st Points classification
1st Stages 2 & 3

2nd Grand Prix of Moscow
4th Overall Five Rings of Moscow
4th Overall Tour of Małopolska
4th Moscow Cup
5th Maykop–Ulyap–Maykop
6th Overall Tour of Kuban

1st Stage 1

6th Grand Prix of Sochi Mayor
8th Tour of Almaty
2016
6th Handzame Classic
2017
1st Stage 4 Okolo Slovenska
5th Rad am Ring

=== Grand Tour general classification results timeline ===
Grand Tour	2016	2017
Giro d'Italia	104	DNF
Tour de France	—	—
Vuelta a España	—	—

Legend
—	Did not compete
DNF	Did not finish
