= 2009 UCI Juniors Track World Championships =

- Venue: Moscow, Russia
- Date: 11–15 August 2009

The 2009 UCI Juniors Track World Championships were the 35th annual Junior World Championships for track cycling held at Moscow, in Russia, from 11 to 15 August.

The Championships had ten events for men (sprint, points race, individual pursuit, team pursuit, 1 kilometre time trial, team sprint, keirin, madison, scratch race, omnium) and nine for women (sprint, individual pursuit, 500 metre time trial, points race, keirin, scratch race, team sprint, team pursuit, omnium).

== Events ==
Event	Gold	Silver	Bronze
Men's Events
Sprint	Sam Webster; New Zealand	Stefan Bötticher; Germany	Christian Tamayo; Colombia
Points race	Sebastian Lander; Denmark	Yu Motosuna; Japan	Matvey Zubov; Russia
Individual pursuit	Michael Hepburn; Australia	Konstantin Kuperasov; Russia	Ivan Savitskiy; Russia
Team pursuit	Konstantin Kuperasov; Victor Manakov; Ivan Savitskiy; Matvey Zubov; Russia	Luke Durbridge; Michael Hepburn; Peter Loft; Dale Parker; Australia	Nikias Arndt; Lucas Liss; Christopher Muche; Kersten Thiele; Germany
Time trial	Nikolay Zhurkin; Russia	Loris Paoli; Italy	Krzysztof Maksel; Poland
Team sprint	Cameron Karwowski; Ethan Mitchell; Sam Webster; New Zealand	Erik Balzer; Stefan Bötticher; Eric Engler; Germany	Pawel Laskowski; Kacper Lesniak; Krzysztof Maksel; Poland
Keirin	Sam Webster; New Zealand	Rino Gasparrini; Italy	Alexander Reinelt; Germany
Madison	Alex Carver; Luke Durbridge; Australia	Jochen Deweer; Gijs Van Hoecke; Belgium	Christian Kreutzfeldt; Sebastian Lander; Denmark
Scratch race	Dario Sonda; Italy	Matias Greve; Denmark	Muhamad Othman; Malaysia
Omnium	Bryan Coquard; France	Konstantin Kuperasov; Russia	Nikias Arndt; Germany

Event	Gold	Silver	Bronze
Women's Events
Sprint	Becky James; United Kingdom	Ekaterina Gnidenko; Russia	Zhong Tianshi; China
Individual pursuit	Michaela Anderson; Australia	Amy Cure; Australia	Hanna Solovey; Ukraine
Time trial	Zhong Tianshi; China	Becky James; United Kingdom	Olivia Montauban; France
Points race	Megan Dunn; Australia	Elena Ceccini; Italy	Uwano Minami; Japan
Keirin	Becky James; United Kingdom	Ekaterina Gnidenko; Russia	Annette Edmondson; Australia
Scratch race	Amy Cure; Australia	Lucie Záleská; Czech Republic	Aleksandra Sošenko; Lithuania
Team sprint	Magali Baudacci; Olivia Montauban; France	Charlott Arndt; Christina Konsulke; Germany	Ekaterina Gnidenko; Olga Hudenko; Russia
Team pursuit	Michaela Anderson; Megan Dunn; Melissa Hoskins; Australia	Elena Lichman; Lidia Malakhova; Maria Mishina; Russia	Amy Pieters; Winanda Spoor; Lotte van Hoek; Netherlands
Omnium	Megan Dunn; Australia	Giulia Donato; Italy	Gabriela Slamova; Czech Republic

== Medal table ==
* Host nation (Russia)

Rank	Nation	Gold	Silver	Bronze	Total
1	Australia (AUS)	7	2	1	10
2	New Zealand (NZL)	3	0	0	3
3	Russia (RUS)*	2	5	3	10
4	Great Britain (GBR)	2	1	0	3
5	France (FRA)	2	0	1	3
6	Italy (ITA)	1	4	0	5
7	Denmark (DEN)	1	1	1	3
8	China (CHN)	1	0	1	2
9	Germany (GER)	0	3	3	6
10	Czech Republic (CZE)	0	1	1	2
10	Japan (JAP)	0	1	1	2
12	Belgium (BEL)	0	1	0	1
13	Poland (POL)	0	0	2	2
14	Colombia (COL)	0	0	1	1
14	Lithuania (LTU)	0	0	1	1
14	Malaysia (MAS)	0	0	1	1
14	Netherlands (NED)	0	0	1	1
14	Ukraine (UKR)	0	0	1	1
Totals (18 entries)		19	19	19	57
