= Artem Ovechkin =

Russian cyclist

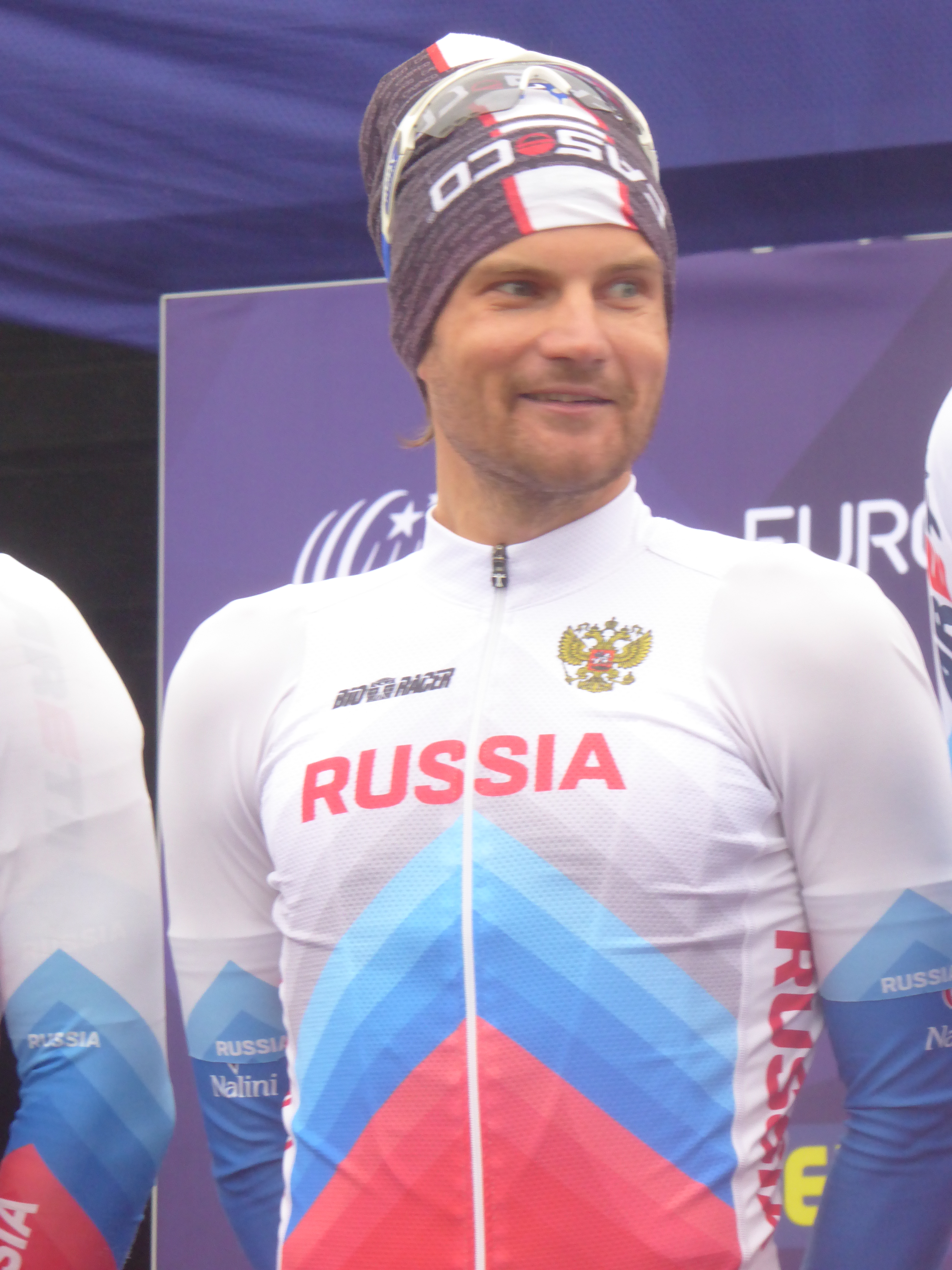
- Ovechkin at the 2018 European Road Cycling Championships

Personal information
- Full name: Artem Sergeyevich Ovechkin
- Born: 11 July 1986 (age 40) Berdsk, Soviet Union
- Height: 1.73 m (5 ft 8 in)
- Weight: 59 kg (130 lb)

Cycling career
- Sport: Cycling
- Current team: Retired
- Discipline: Road
- Role: Rider

Amateur team
- 2009: Lokomotiv

Professional teams
- 2009: Team Katusha (stagiaire)
- 2010–2011: Team Katusha
- 2012–2017: RusVelo
- 2018–2021: Terengganu Cycling Team

Major wins
- One-day races and Classics National Time Trial Championships (2009, 2015, 2018, 2019, 2020)

Artem Sergeyevich Ovechkin (Russian: Артём Сергеевич Овечкин; born 11 July 1986) is a Russian former professional road bicycle racer, who rode professionally between 2010 and 2021 for Team Katusha, Gazprom–RusVelo and the Terengganu Cycling Team.

== Major results ==
2007
5th Overall Way to Pekin

1st Stages 4 & 5 (ITT)

2008
3rd Time trial, UEC European Under-23 Road Championships
10th Time trial, UCI Under-23 Road World Championships
2009
1st Time trial, National Road Championships
1st Duo Normand (with Nikolay Trusov)
2010
1st Duo Normand (with Alexandre Pliușchin)
4th Time trial, National Road Championships
5th Overall Tour of Austria

1st Young rider classification

8th Overall Ster Elektrotoer
2011
4th Time trial, National Road Championships
2012
4th Overall Grand Prix of Adygeya
2013
3rd Time trial, National Road Championships
10th Overall Course de la Solidarité Olympique
2014
3rd Time trial, National Road Championships
3rd Duo Normand (with Ivan Balykin)
7th Overall Tour of Belgium
10th Overall Tour of Slovenia
2015
1st Time trial, National Road Championships
1st Stage 1 (ITT) Tour of Slovenia
3rd Grand Prix of Sochi Mayor
6th Overall Grand Prix of Sochi
6th Chrono Champenois
2016
1st Stage 1b (TTT) Settimana Internazionale di Coppi e Bartali
2017
5th Time trial, National Road Championships
7th Overall Tour d'Azerbaïdjan
2018
1st Time trial, National Road Championships
1st Overall Tour de Langkawi

1st Stage 5

1st Overall Tour of Antalya

1st Stage 3

2nd Overall Tour of China II

1st Stage 4 (ITT)

2nd Overall Tour of Thailand
4th Overall Tour de Korea
2019
1st Time trial, National Road Championships
4th Overall Tour of China II

1st Prologue

5th Overall Tour of Iran (Azerbaijan)
6th Overall Tour of Fuzhou
7th Overall Tour of China I
2020
1st Time trial, National Road Championships
3rd Overall Tour de Langkawi
6th Grand Prix World's Best High Altitude
2021
2nd Time trial, National Road Championships

=== Grand Tour general classification results timeline ===
He was named in the start list for the 2016 Giro d'Italia.

Grand Tour	2016
Giro d'Italia	142
Tour de France	—
Vuelta a España	—

Legend
—	Did not compete
DNF	Did not finish
