= Roman Maikin =

Russian cyclist

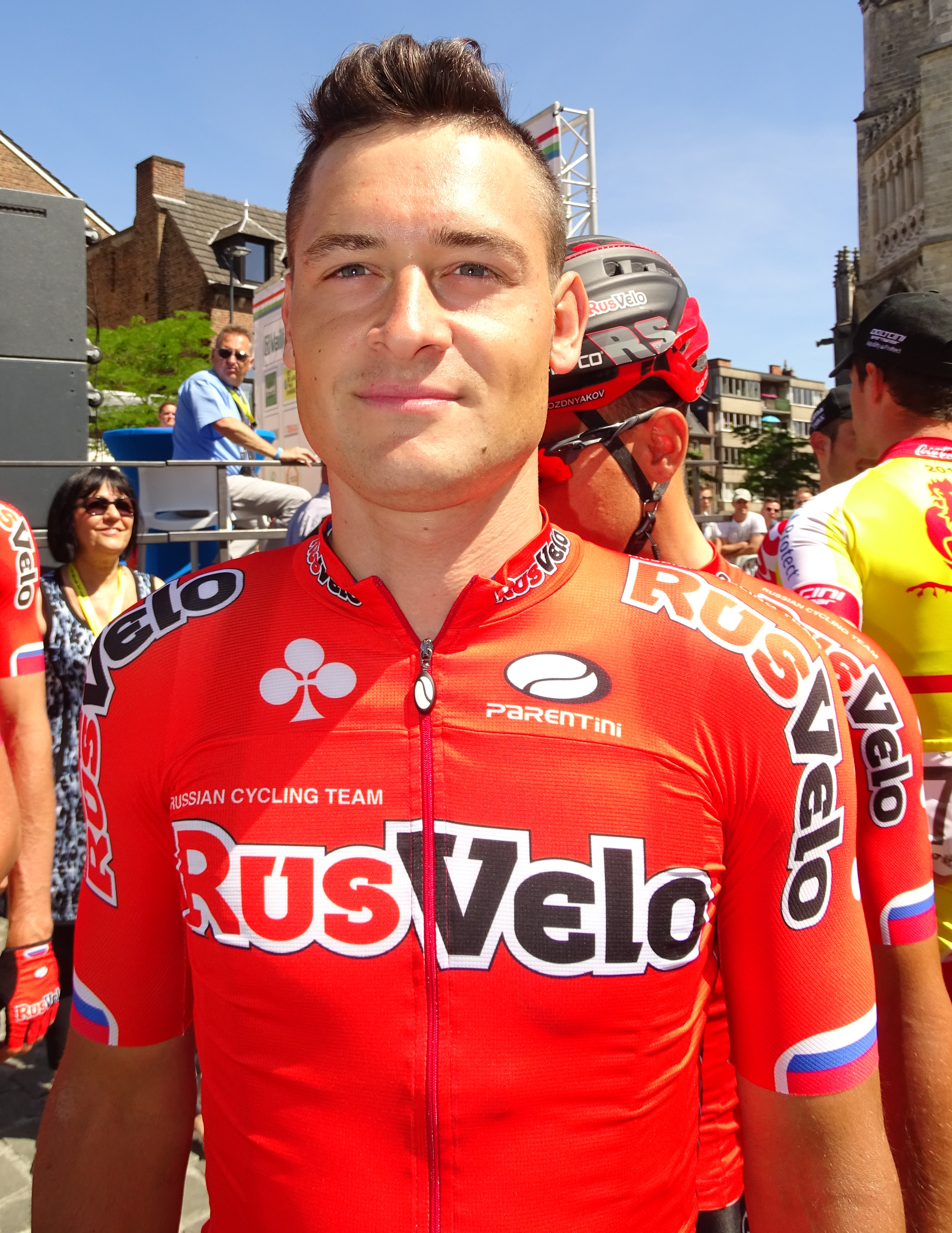
- Maikin in 2015.

Personal information
- Full name: Roman Yuryevich Maikin; Роман Юрьевич Майкин
- Born: 14 August 1990 (age 36) Saint Petersburg, Russia
- Height: 1.77 m (5 ft 10 in)
- Weight: 68 kg (150 lb)

Cycling career
- Sport: Cycling
- Current team: Pingtan International Tourism Island Cycling Team
- Discipline: Road
- Role: Rider
- Rider type: Sprinter

Amateur teams
- 2009: Lokomotiv
- 2021: Marathon–Tula
- 2021: Samara Region
- 2021: Volga Union Team
- 2022: Cycling Sport Club "OLYMP"
- 2022: Tập Đoàn Lộc Trời
- 2023: Gạo hạt Ngọc Trời

Professional teams
- 2010: Itera–Katusha
- 2012: RusVelo (stagiaire)
- 2013–2018: RusVelo
- 2019: Minsk Cycling Club
- 2020: Cambodia Cycling Academy
- 2022: Vozrozhdenie
- 2023–: Pingtan International Tourism Island Cycling Team

Roman Yuryevich Maikin (Russian: Роман Юрьевич Майкин; born 14 August 1990) is a Russian racing cyclist, who rides for UCI Continental team Pingtan International Tourism Island Cycling Team. He rode at the 2014 UCI Road World Championships.

== Major results ==
2012
6th Schaal Sels
7th Grote Prijs Stad Zottegem
2014
3rd Giro di Toscana
4th Mayor Cup
7th Overall Grand Prix of Sochi

1st Points classification
1st Stage 2

2015
Tour of Kuban

1st Points classification
1st Stage 3

2nd Krasnodar–Anapa
2nd Grand Prix Minsk
2nd Coupe des Carpathes
3rd Maykop–Ulyap–Maykop
3rd Memoriał Henryka Łasaka
3rd Arnhem–Veenendaal Classic
5th Grand Prix of Moscow
5th Circuito de Getxo
8th Moscow Cup
9th Gran Premio Industria e Commercio di Prato
2016
1st Stage 2 Tour du Limousin
2nd Overall Tour of Estonia

1st Stage 2

3rd Grote Prijs Jef Scherens
3rd Tour of Almaty
8th Clásica de Almería
9th Ronde van Limburg
9th Coppa Bernocchi
10th Gran Premio di Lugano
10th Coppa Sabatini
2017
4th Gran Premio della Costa Etruschi
2018
2nd Overall Belgrade–Banja Luka
10th Classic Loire-Atlantique
2019
4th Overall Tour of Xingtai
6th Overall Five Rings of Moscow
2020
1st Stage 1 Tour de Serbie
2021
2nd Overall Five Rings of Moscow
4th Road race, National Road Championships
2024
1st Overall Tour of Huangshan

1st Stage 2
