= Nikias Arndt =

German cyclist (born 1991)

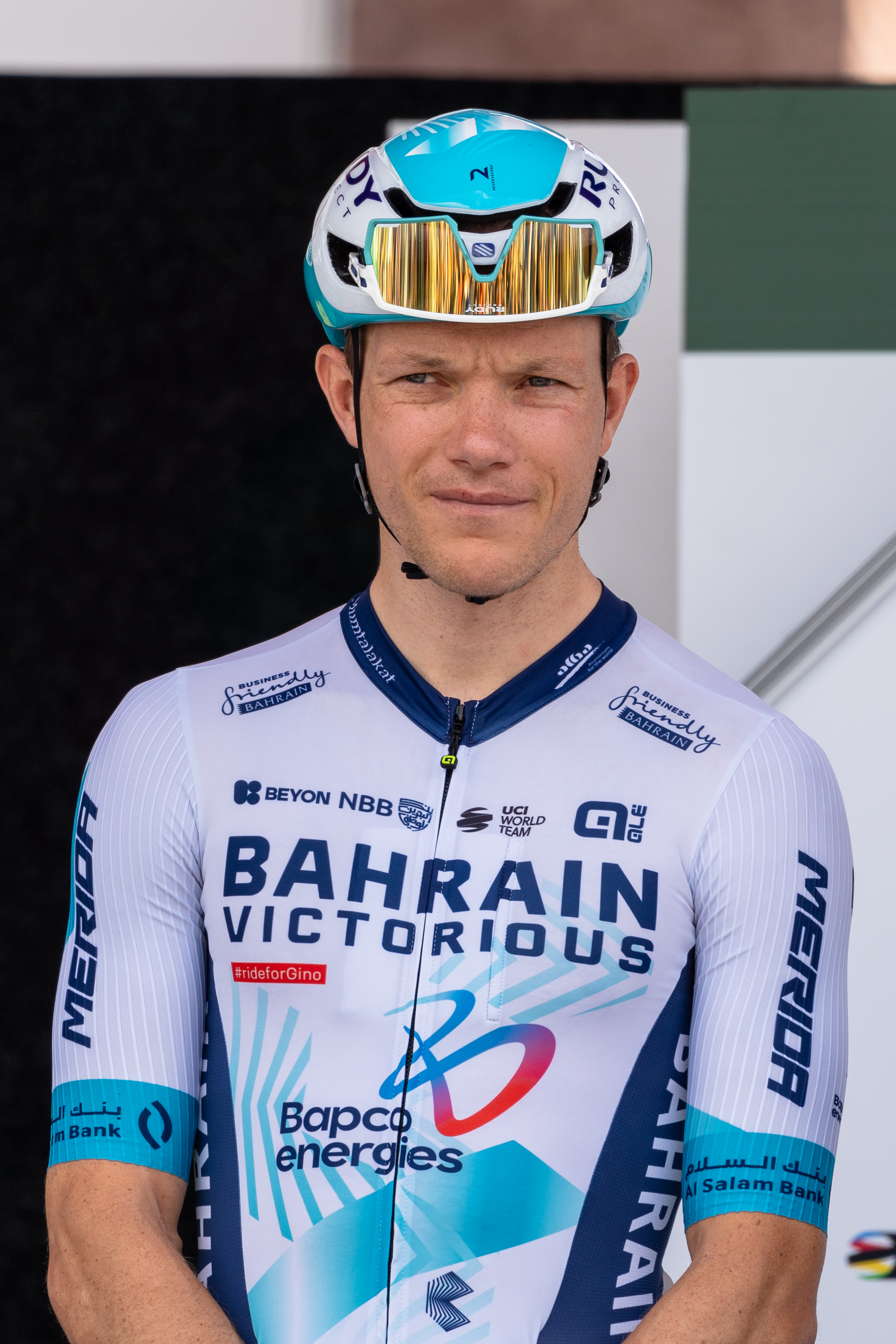
- Arndt in Espelette, 2024 Itzulia.

Personal information
- Full name: Nikias Arndt
- Born: 18 November 1991 (age 34) Buchholz in der Nordheide, Germany
- Height: 1.88 m (6 ft 2 in)
- Weight: 77 kg (170 lb; 12 st 2 lb)

Cycling career
- Sport: Cycling
- Current team: Team Bahrain Victorious
- Disciplines: Road; Track
- Role: Rider
- Rider type: Sprinter; Time trialist; Road captain

Amateur team
- 2010–2012: LKT Team Brandenburg

Professional teams
- 2013–2022: Argos–Shimano
- 2023–: Team Bahrain Victorious

Major wins
- Grand Tours Giro d'Italia 1 individual stage (2016) Vuelta a España 1 individual stage (2019) One-day races and Classics Great Ocean Road Race (2017)
Medal record
Representing Germany
Men's road bicycle racing
World Championships
Gold medal – first place	2021 Flanders	Mixed team relay

Nikias Arndt (born 18 November 1991) is a German professional track and road cyclist, who rides for UCI WorldTeam Team Bahrain Victorious.

== Career ==
Arndt rode for LKT Team Brandenburg between 2010 and 2012, before joining the Argos–Shimano team for the 2013 season. He achieved his first professional victory at the 2013 Arctic Race of Norway, winning the third stage, en route to finishing third overall behind Thor Hushovd and Kenny van Hummel. Arndt also won the young riders classification at the event, as the best-placed rider under the age of 25. The following year, he took his first win at the UCI World Tour level, winning stage three of the Critérium du Dauphiné in a sprint finish. In 2016, Arndt won the final stage of the Giro d'Italia, his first Grand Tour stage win.

In early 2017, he won the Cadel Evans Great Ocean Road Race, a one-day race on the World Tour. In June of the same year, he was named in the startlist for the Tour de France, which was his first time competing in the race. He notably finished second on stage 19. His success at Grand Tours continued after a relatively uneventful 2018 season, winning stage eight of the 2019 Vuelta a España. He was part of the winning team in the mixed relay event at the 2021 UCI Road World Championships in September. The month prior, he also won a stage of the Tour de Pologne.

After ten years with Argos–Shimano and its subsequent iterations, Arndt signed a two-year deal in August 2022 with Team Bahrain Victorious, starting from the 2023 season.

== Major results ==
=== Road ===
2009
2nd Time trial, National Junior Championships
2nd Overall Course de la Paix Juniors

1st Stages 3 (ITT) & 4

2nd Overall Driedaagse van Axel

1st Stage 1

3rd Overall Niedersachsen Rundfahrt

1st Stage 4

3rd Overall Trofeo Karlsberg
4th Time trial, UCI World Junior Championships
9th Overall Kroz Istru
2010
1st Overall Tour of Alanya

1st Stage 3

1st Stage 4 Cinturón a Mallorca
4th Overall Thüringen Rundfahrt der U23

1st Stage 6

9th Overall Dookoła Mazowsza
2011
1st Stage 5 Tour de l'Avenir
8th Overall Thüringen Rundfahrt der U23

1st Stage 3

9th Overall Tour of Greece
2012
1st Overall Tour de Berlin

1st Stages 2 (ITT) & 3

Thüringen Rundfahrt der U23

1st Points classification
1st Stage 7

1st Stage 3 Istrian Spring Trophy
1st Points classification, Tour of Bulgaria
2013 (1 pro win)
3rd Overall Arctic Race of Norway

1st Young rider classification
1st Stage 3

2014 (1)
1st Stage 3 Critérium du Dauphiné
2nd Time trial, National Championships
2015 (1)
1st Stage 6 Tour of Alberta
National Championships

2nd Road race
2nd Time trial

3rd Münsterland Giro
2016 (1)
1st Stage 21 Giro d'Italia
3rd Rund um Köln
7th Scheldeprijs
7th Rudi Altig Race
8th Overall Tour de Yorkshire
2017 (1)
1st Cadel Evans Great Ocean Road Race
2018
3rd Time trial, National Championships
6th Cadel Evans Great Ocean Road Race
8th EuroEyes Cyclassics
2019 (1)
1st Stage 8 Vuelta a España
2021 (1)
1st Team relay, UCI Road World Championships
1st Stage 5 Tour de Pologne
2022
2nd Road race, National Championships
3rd Rund um Köln

==== Grand Tour general classification results timeline ====
Grand Tour	2013	2014	2015	2016	2017	2018	2019	2020	2021	2022	2023
Giro d'Italia	—	—	148	87	—	—	—	—	62	—	—
Tour de France	—	—	—	—	84	67	116	126	—	—	121
Vuelta a España	136	102	—	159	—	—	69	—	—	DNF	—

Legend
—	Did not compete
DNF	Did not finish

=== Track ===
2009
UCI World Junior Championships

3rd Omnium
3rd Team pursuit

2011
UCI World Cup, Astana

3rd Individual pursuit
3rd Scratch

2012
1st Points race, Perth International Grand Prix
3rd Omnium, UCI World Cup, Beijing
