= Nikolay Zhurkin =

Russian cyclist

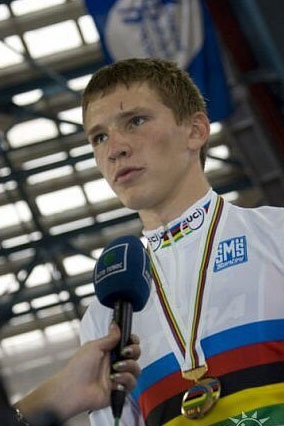
- Zhurkin in 2009

Personal information
- Full name: Nikolay Sergeyevich Zhurkin; Russian: Николай Сергеевич Журкин
- Born: 5 May 1991 (age 35): Dushanbe, Tajik SSR, Soviet Union; (now Tajikistan)

Cycling career
- Sport: Cycling
- Disciplines: Road; Track
- Role: Rider
- Rider type: Puncheur

Amateur teams
- 2015: Sestroretsk
- 2017: Udmurtia
- 2018: Crimea Republic
- 2019: Tula Region

Professional teams
- 2012–2013: RusVelo
- 2013: Russian Helicopters
- 2014: RTS–Santic Racing Team
- 2020: Cambodia Cycling Academy

Nikolay Sergeyevich Zhurkin (Russian: Николай Сергеевич Журкин; born 5 May 1991) is a Russian professional racing cyclist, who most recently rode for UCI Continental team Cambodia Cycling Academy.

== Major results ==
2009
1st Kilo, UCI Juniors Track World Championships
UEC European Junior Track Championships

2nd Sprint
3rd Kilo

2010
3rd Kilo, UEC European Under-23 Track Championships
2012
1st Team pursuit, UEC European Under-23 Track Championships
2013
1st Team pursuit, 2012–13 UCI Track Cycling World Cup, Aguascalientes
2015
1st Stage 3 Bałtyk–Karkonosze Tour
2019
Vuelta Ciclista a Costa Rica

1st Stages 3b (TTT) & 6
