= Sergey Firsanov =

Russian road racing cyclist

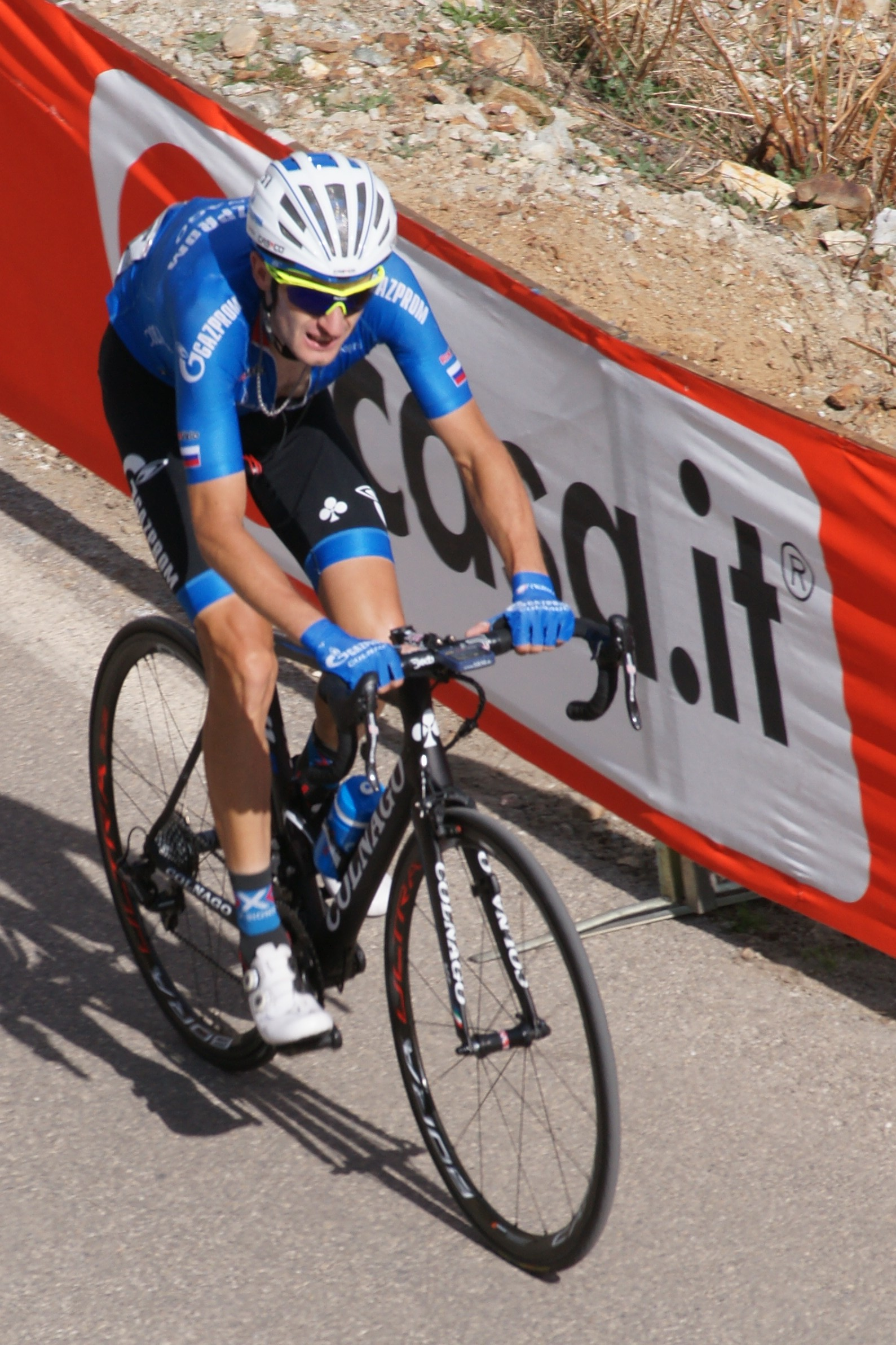
- Firsanov in 2016.

Personal information
- Full name: Sergey Nikolayevich Firsanov
- Born: 3 July 1982 (age 44): Velikiye Luki, Pskov Oblast, Soviet Union; (now Russia)
- Height: 1.73 m (5 ft 8 in)
- Weight: 58 kg (128 lb; 9.1 st)

Cycling career
- Sport: Cycling
- Discipline: Road
- Role: Rider
- Rider type: Climber

Amateur team
- 2001–2003: Olympique St-Petersburg

Professional teams
- 2005: Rietumu Banka–Riga
- 2006: Premier
- 2006–2008: Rietumu Banka–Riga
- 2009–2010: Team Designa Køkken
- 2011: Itera–Katusha
- 2012–2018: RusVelo

Sergey Nikolayevich Firsanov (Russian: Сергей Николаевич Фирсанов; born 3 July 1982) is a Russian professional road bicycle racer, who last rode for UCI Professional Continental team Gazprom–RusVelo.

== Career ==
Born in Velikiye Luki, Firsanov has competed as a professional since 2005, competing for the Rietumu Banka–Riga squad during two separate spells, as well as the Premier, Team Designa Køkken and Itera–Katusha squads before signing for the newly formed RusVelo team for the 2012 season.

Firsanov achieved the team's first overall victory at the Vuelta a la Comunidad de Madrid; after a third-place finish in the race-opening individual time trial, Firsanov won the race's second and final stage by almost two minutes from his nearest competitors, to comfortably take the general classification victory.

He was named in the start list for the 2016 Giro d'Italia.

== Major results ==
2001
9th Tour du Jura
2004
9th Overall Grand Prix Guillaume Tell
2005
1st Overall Giro della Toscana
4th Overall Grand Prix of Sochi
2006
1st Stage 6 (ITT) Bałtyk–Karkonosze Tour
2nd Overall Tour of Bulgaria

1st Stage 5a

3rd Szlakiem Walk Majora Hubala
6th Overall Five Rings of Moscow
6th Overall Okolo Slovenska
7th Grand Prix of Moscow
8th Overall Grand Prix of Sochi
8th Coupe des Carpathes
2007
1st Memorial Oleg Dyachenko
2nd Overall Five Rings of Moscow
3rd Coupe des Carpathes
5th Overall Tour of Małopolska
7th Overall Le Triptyque des Monts et Châteaux
7th Puchar Ministra Obrony Narodowej
8th Overall Circuit des Ardennes
8th Mayor Cup
9th Overall Rhône-Alpes Isère Tour
9th Memoriał Henryka Łasaka
2008
1st Overall Way to Pekin

1st Points classification
1st Mountains classification
1st Stages 2, 3 (ITT) & 7

2nd Overall Ringerike GP

1st Stage 2

3rd Overall Okolo Slovenska

1st Stage 4a (ITT)

3rd Overall Les 3 Jours de Vaucluse
3rd Overall Tour of Małopolska
4th Overall Rhône-Alpes Isère Tour
7th Coupe des Carpathes
2009
1st Overall Boucle de l'Artois

1st Stage 3

1st Overall Ringerike GP

1st Stage 2

1st Overall Friendship People North-Caucasus Stage Race
2nd Duo Normand (with Aleksejs Saramotins)
5th Overall Rhône-Alpes Isère Tour
5th Grand Prix of Moscow
5th Rogaland GP
7th Overall Tønsberg 4-dagers

1st Stage 4 (ITT)

2010
1st Overall Friendship People North-Caucasus Stage Race

1st Stages 4 & 5 (ITT)

1st Overall Five Rings of Moscow

1st Stage 1

2nd Overall Ringerike GP
3rd Overall Rhône-Alpes Isère Tour
4th Westrozebeke
6th Memorial Oleg Dyachenko
7th Overall Danmark Rundt
7th Chrono Champenois
10th Grand Prix of Moscow
2011
1st Overall Friendship People North-Caucasus Stage Race

1st Stages 1 (ITT), 5, 6, 7 (ITT) & 12

1st Overall Five Rings of Moscow

1st Stage 1

2nd Overall Grand Prix of Adygeya

1st Stage 3

5th Overall Okolo Slovenska
5th Mayor Cup
6th Overall Settimana Ciclistica Lombarda
7th Overall Tour de Serbie
9th Grand Prix of Donetsk
2012
1st Overall Vuelta a la Comunidad de Madrid

1st Points classification
1st Stage 2

2nd Overall Grand Prix of Adygeya

1st Stage 1 (ITT)

3rd Eschborn-Frankfurt City Loop
4th Overall Tour of Belgium
5th Overall Tour of Norway
6th GP Industria & Artigianato di Larciano
7th Overall Tour of Qinghai Lake
2013
5th Overall Settimana Ciclistica Lombarda
10th Overall Vuelta a Castilla y León
10th Tre Valli Varesine
2014
1st Overall Tour of Kavkaz

1st Stage 4

3rd Overall Grand Prix of Adygeya
6th GP Industria & Artigianato di Larciano
6th Giro di Toscana
7th Overall Settimana Internazionale di Coppi e Bartali
2015
1st Overall Grand Prix of Adygeya

1st Stage 2

1st Grand Prix of Sochi Mayor
2nd Tre Valli Varesine
4th Tour of Almaty
5th Overall Tour of Croatia
5th Overall Tour d'Azerbaïdjan

1st Stage 5

7th Overall Grand Prix of Sochi
9th Prueba Villafranca de Ordizia
2016
1st Overall Settimana Internazionale di Coppi e Bartali

1st Mountains classification
1st Stage 2

1st Giro dell'Appennino
4th Overall Giro del Trentino
2018
9th Grand Prix de Plumelec-Morbihan
10th Boucles de l'Aulne

=== Grand Tour general classification results timeline ===
Grand Tour	2016	2017
Giro d'Italia	30	96
Tour de France	—	—
Vuelta a España	—	—

Legend
—	Did not compete
DNF	Did not finish
