= Russian Helicopters (cycling team) =

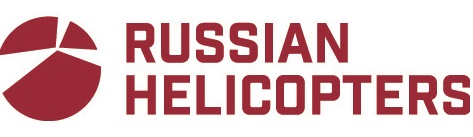

Team information
- UCI code: HCL
- Registered: Russia
- Founded: 2013
- Disbanded: 2014
- Discipline: Road
- Status: UCI Continental

Key personnel
- General manager: Roberto Vigni
- Team manager: Roberto Vigni

Team name history
- 2013 2014: Helicopters; Russian Helicopters

Russian Helicopters was a Russian UCI Continental cycling team.

== 2014 team roster ==
As of 1 January 2014.

Rider	Date of birth
Maksim Andreev (RUS)	28 May 1995 (aged 18)
Aleksandr Antonov (Note: Antonov joined the team on 1 August as a stagiaire) (RUS)	8 May 1995 (aged 18)
Pavel Chursin (RUS)	21 April 1995 (aged 18)
Alexander Evtushenko (RUS)	30 June 1993 (aged 20)
Alexander Grigoryev (RUS)	21 March 1992 (aged 21)
Aleksandr Komin (Note: Komin joined the team on 28 March) (RUS)	12 April 1995 (aged 18)
Ivan Kovalev (Note: Koalev Left the team on 1 June) (RUS)	26 July 1986 (aged 27)
Evgeny Kovalev (RUS)	6 March 1989 (aged 24)

Rider	Date of birth
Alexey Kurbatov (RUS)	9 May 1994 (aged 19)
Roman Kustadinchev (RUS)	3 August 1995 (aged 18)
Pavel Leonov (RUS)	25 April 1995 (aged 18)
Alexsandr Lobanov (Note: Antonov joined the team on 1 August as a stagiaire) (RUS)	29 April 1995 (aged 18)
Artem Nych (RUS)	21 March 1995 (aged 18)
Ivan Savitskiy (RUS)	6 March 1992 (aged 21)
Andrey Sazanov (RUS)	25 January 1994 (aged 19)
Matvey Zubov (RUS)	22 January 1991 (aged 22)

== Major wins ==
2013
Stage 4 Grand Prix of Adygeya, Alexander Foliforov
Stage 5 Grand Prix of Adygeya, Mamyr Stash

2014
Stage 3 Grand Prix of Sochi, Alexander Evtushenko
Stage 3 Grand Prix of Adygeya, Andrey Sazanov
Stage 5 Grand Prix Udmurtskaya Pravda, Evgeny Kovalev
