= Igor Boev =

Russian cyclist

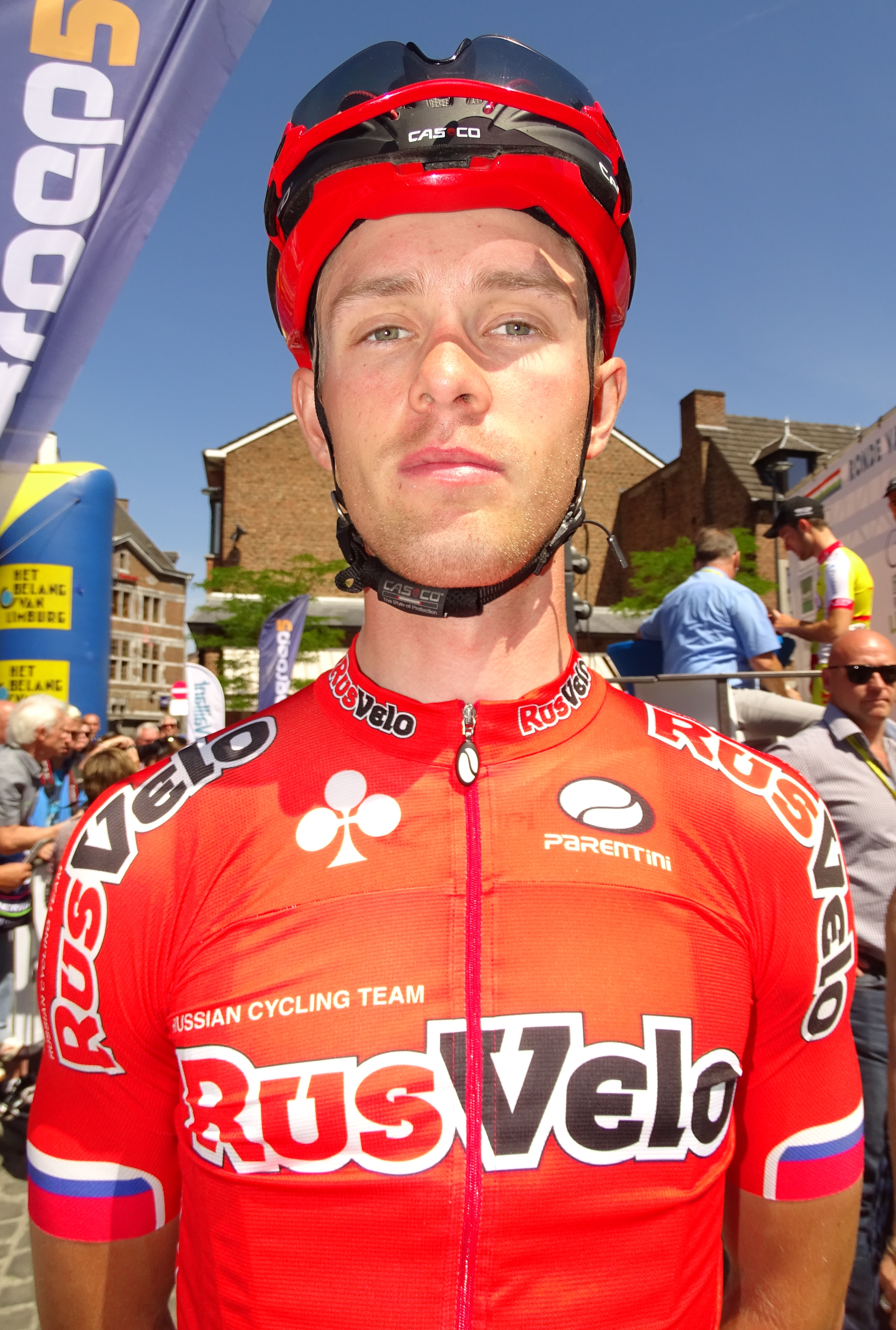
- Boev in 2015.

Personal information
- Full name: Igor Ivanovich Boev
- Born: 22 November 1989 (age 36): Voronezh, Russian SFSR; (now Russia)
- Height: 1.86 m (6 ft 1 in)
- Weight: 74 kg (163 lb)

Cycling career
- Sport: Cycling
- Current team: Gazprom–RusVelo
- Discipline: Road
- Role: Rider

Professional teams
- 2012: Itera–Katusha
- 2013–: RusVelo

Igor Ivanovich Boev (Russian: Игорь Иванович Боев; born 22 November 1989) is a Russian professional racing cyclist, who currently rides for UCI ProTeam Gazprom–RusVelo.

== Major results ==
2010
10th Grand Prix of Donetsk
2011
2nd Overall Baltic Chain Tour
9th Memorial Oleg Dyachenko
2012
1st Overall Five Rings of Moscow

1st Stage 3

1st Grand Prix de la ville de Nogent-sur-Oise
1st Mayor Cup
1st Stage 2 Tour du Loir-et-Cher
1st Stage 3 (TTT) Circuit des Ardennes
3rd La Roue Tourangelle
2014
Grand Prix of Adygeya

1st Points classification
1st Stages 2 & 5

Five Rings of Moscow

1st Points classification
1st Stages 2 & 4

Tour of Kavkaz

1st Mountains classification
1st Stage 2

2nd Memorial Oleg Dyachenko
2016
6th Gran Premio della Costa Etruschi
7th Grote Prijs Stad Zottegem
2017
5th Road race, National Road Championships
