= Olga Hudenko =

Russian cyclist

Personal information
- Born: 19 August 1991 (age 35) Russia

Cycling career
- Sport: Cycling
- Discipline: Track cycling

Olga Hudenko (born 19 August 1991) is a track cyclist from Russia. She represented her nation at the 2015 UCI Track Cycling World Championships.

== Major results ==
2014
Grand Prix Minsk

1st Keirin
1st Sprint

Grand Prix of Russian Helicopters

1st Sprint
2nd Keirin

2015
Grand Prix of Tula

2nd Keirin
3rd Sprint

Memorial of Alexander Lesnikov

2nd Keirin
2nd Sprint
