= Leonid Krasnov =

Russian cyclist

Personal information
- Born: 24 January 1988 (age 38): Leningrad, Russian SFSR, Soviet Union; (now Saint Petersburg, Russia)

Cycling career
- Sport: Cycling
- Current team: Retired
- Discipline: Road
- Role: Rider

Professional teams
- 2009: Lokomotiv
- 2011: Itera–Katusha
- 2012–2014: RusVelo
- 2017: Tusnad Cycling Team

Leonid Krasnov (born 24 January 1988) is a Russian former professional racing cyclist.

== Major results ==
2012
1st Stage 5 Grand Prix of Sochi
1st Stage 3 Tour of China II
1st Stage 1 Tour of Hainan
2nd Jurmala Grand Prix
2013
1st Stage 1a Tour of Estonia
2nd Grand Prix of Moscow
2014
1st Grand Prix of Moscow
