= Alexander Foliforov =

Russian cyclist

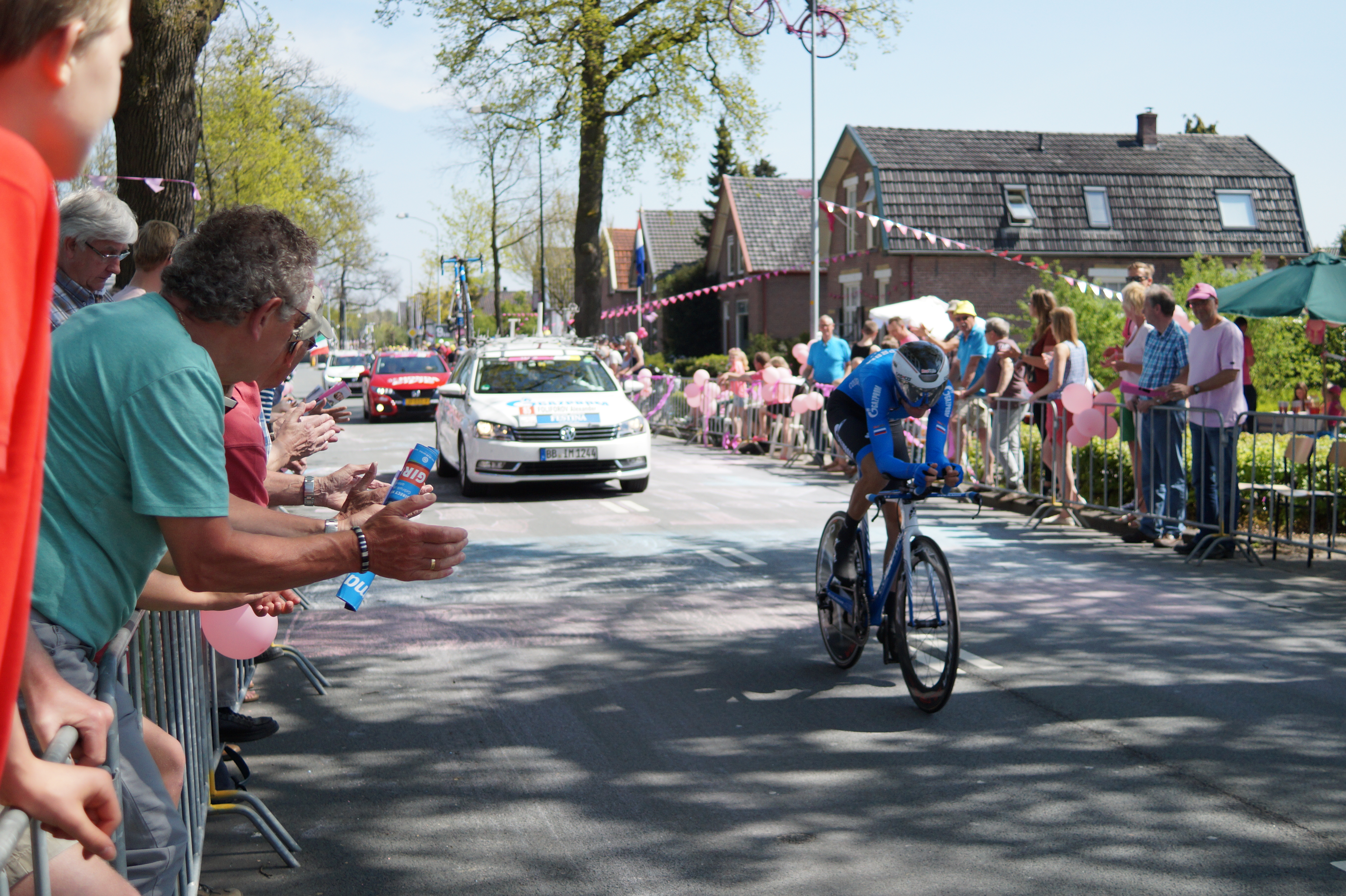
- Foliforov in 2016

Personal information
- Full name: Alexander Sergeyevich Foliforov
- Born: 8 March 1992 (age 34) Kovrov, Russia
- Height: 1.80 m (5 ft 11 in)
- Weight: 68 kg (150 lb)

Cycling career
- Sport: Cycling
- Discipline: Road
- Role: Rider
- Rider type: Time trialist; Climber

Professional teams
- 2012: Itera–Katusha
- 2013: Russian Helicopters
- 2014: Itera–Katusha
- 2015–2018: RusVelo

Major wins
- Grand Tours Giro d'Italia 1 individual stage (2016)

Alexander Sergeyevich Foliforov (Russian: Алекса́ндр Серге́евич Фоли́форов; born 8 March 1992) is a Russian professional racing cyclist, who last rode for UCI Professional Continental team Gazprom–RusVelo. He was named in the start list for the 2016 Giro d'Italia, winning the individual time trial on Stage 15.

== Major results ==
2012
6th Overall Tour de Serbie

1st Young rider classification

10th Overall Toscana-Terra di Ciclismo
2013
1st Stage 4 Grand Prix of Adygeya
5th Road race, UEC European Under-23 Road Championships
5th Overall Giro della Valle d'Aosta
7th Trofeo Banca Popolare di Vicenza
2014
1st Stage 4 Grand Prix of Adygeya
2nd Trofeo PIVA
4th Overall Tour de l'Avenir
6th Overall Ronde de l'Isard

1st Points classification
1st Mountains classification
1st Stages 1 & 4

2015
1st Overall Grand Prix of Sochi

1st Stage 4 (ITT)

2nd Grand Prix of Sochi Mayor
10th Overall Tour of Slovenia
2016
1st Stage 15 (ITT) Giro d'Italia
2017
1st Mountains classification, Tour of the Alps

=== Grand Tour general classification results timeline ===
Grand Tour	2016	2017
Giro d'Italia	45	40
Tour de France	—	—
Vuelta a España	—	—

Legend
—	Did not compete
DNF	Did not finish
