= Cambodia Cycling Academy =

Cambodian cycling team

Team information
- UCI code: CCA
- Registered: Cambodia
- Founded: 2020
- Discipline: Road
- Status: UCI Continental

Key personnel
- General manager: Pen Sreymom
- Team managers: Patrick Augrignac; Stephene Carandante; Éric Rouzet

Team name history
- 2020–: Cambodia Cycling Academy

Cambodia Cycling Academy is a Cambodian UCI Continental cycling team founded in 2020.

== Team roster ==
As of 21 April 2021.

| Rider | Date of birth |
|---|---|
| Samy Aurignac (FRA) | 21 December 1992 (age 33) |
| Lokraksmey Huot (CAM) | 23 October 1997 (age 28) |
| Chantou Kim (CAM) | 19 March 2000 (age 26) |
| Christopher Lamaille (FRA) | 22 August 1999 (age 27) |
| Viwath Lim (CAM) | 15 December 2002 (age 23) |

| Rider | Date of birth |
|---|---|
| Vichith Ny (CAM) | 10 September 1994 (age 31) |
| Nama San (CAM) | 16 July 2001 (age 25) |
| Namav San (CAM) | 22 April 2000 (age 26) |
| Lorenzo Serres (FRA) | 28 May 1998 (age 28) |
| Thomas Vaubourzeix (FRA) | 16 June 1989 (age 37) |

== Major wins ==
2020
Stage 1 Tour de Serbie, Roman Maikin
