= Ivan Balykin =

Russian cyclist

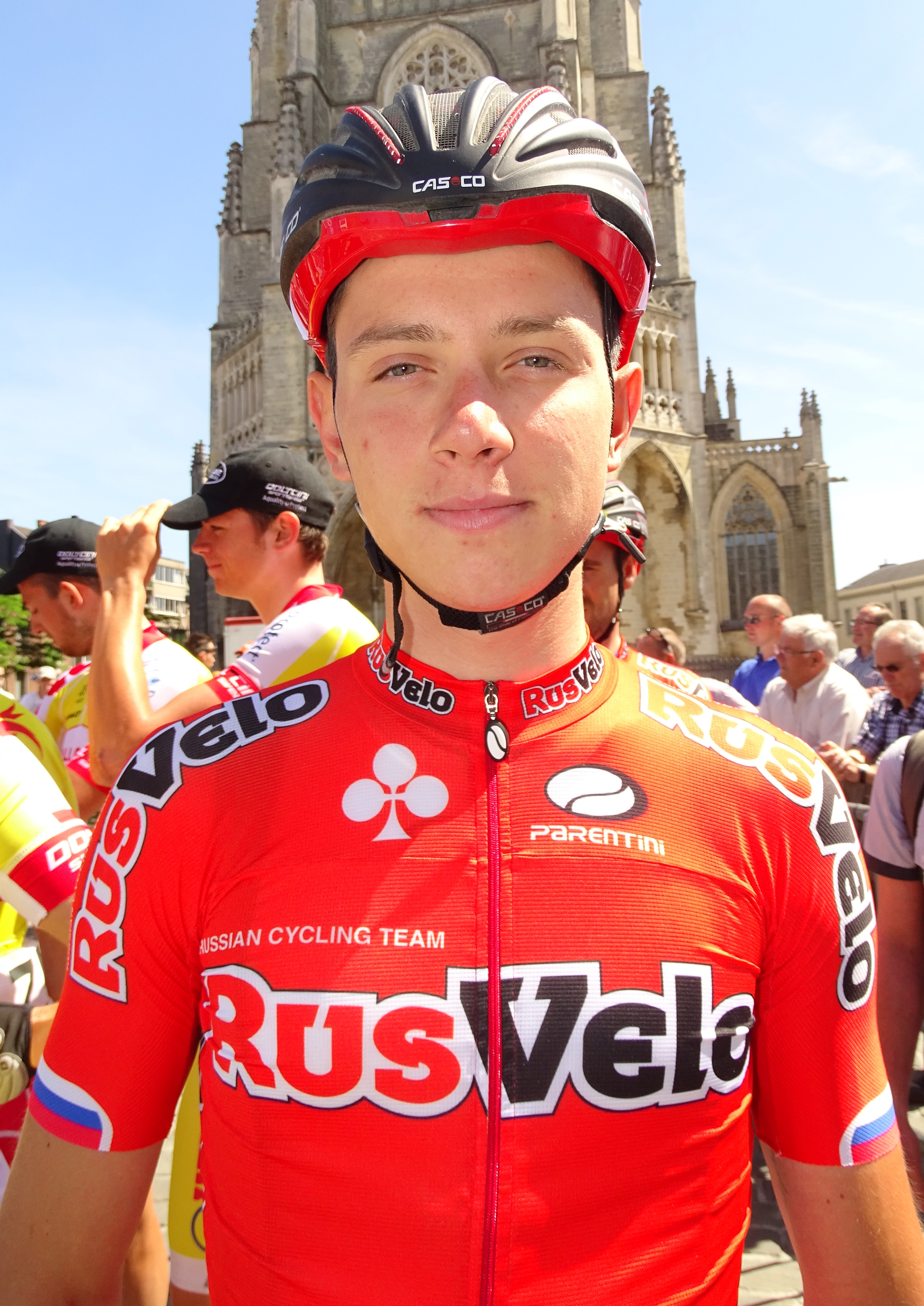
- Balykin in 2015.

Personal information
- Full name: Ivan Balykin
- Born: 26 November 1990 (age 35) Naberezhnye Chelny, Russia
- Height: 1.79 m (5 ft 10 in)
- Weight: 68 kg (150 lb)

Cycling career
- Sport: Cycling
- Discipline: Road
- Role: Rider

Amateur teams
- 2009–2011: US Fausto Coppi Gazzera Videa
- 2012: Petroli Firenze
- 2013: GS Podenzano

Professional teams
- 2014–2015: RusVelo
- 2016: GM Europa Ovini
- 2017–2018: Torku Şekerspor

Ivan Balykin (Russian: Иван Балыкин; born 26 November 1990) is a Russian racing cyclist, who most recently competed for Torku Şekerspor. He rode at the 2014 UCI Road World Championships.

== Major results ==
2010
5th Coppa della Pace
2013
4th Coppa della Pace
9th Gran Premio Industrie del Marmo
2014
1st Stage 2 Baltic Chain Tour
1st Mountains classification Grand Prix Udmurtskaya Pravda
3rd Duo Normand (with Artem Ovechkin)
4th Overall Five Rings of Moscow
5th Mayor Cup
9th Gran Premio Bruno Beghelli
2015
1st Maykop–Ulyap–Maykop
6th Overall Tour of Estonia
6th Overall Tour de Serbie
6th Grand Prix Minsk
7th Minsk Cup
9th Overall Five Rings of Moscow
2016
4th Gran Premio de San José
2017
Les Challenges de la Marche Verte

1st GP Oued Eddahab
7th GP Sakia El Hamra
9th GP Al Massira

1st Stage 2 Tour of Ankara
1st Stage 2b (ITT) Tour of Bihor
6th Poreč Trophy
8th Trophée de l'Anniversaire, Challenge du Prince
2018
2nd Overall Tour of Mevlana

1st Stage 2

3rd Grand Prix Alanya
4th Overall Tour of Mesopotamia

1st Stage 2

4th Overall Tour of Mersin
6th Overall Belgrade–Banja Luka
9th Grand Prix Side
