= Tour of Kavkaz =

Russian multi-day road cycling race

Race details
- Date: October
- Region: Caucasus, Russia
- Discipline: Road
- Competition: UCI Europe Tour
- Type: Stage race

History
- First edition: 2014
- Editions: 1
- First winner: Sergey Firsanov (RUS)
- Most wins: No repeat winners
- Most recent: Sergey Firsanov (RUS)

Tour of Kavkaz is a cycling race held annually in Russia. It is part of UCI Europe Tour in category 2.2.

== Winners ==
Year	Country	Rider	Team
2014	Russia	Sergey Firsanov	RusVelo
