= Roman Kustadinchev =

Russian bicycle racer

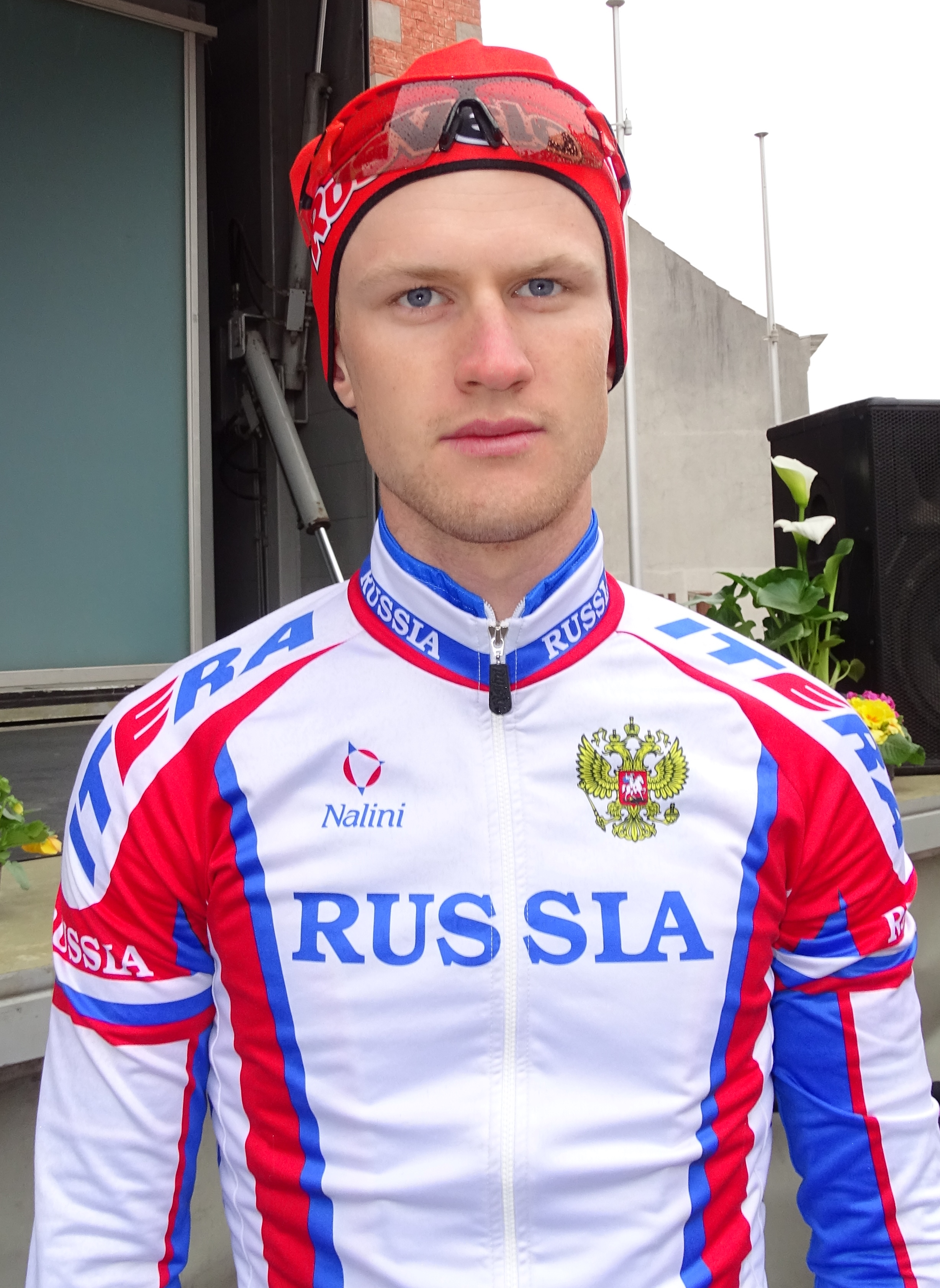
- Kustadinchev at the 2015 Le Triptyque des Monts et Châteaux

Personal information
- Full name: Roman Kustadinchev
- Born: August 3, 1995 (age 31) Krasnodar, Russia
- Height: 1.83 m (6 ft 0 in)
- Weight: 68 kg (150 lb)

Cycling career
- Sport: Cycling
- Discipline: Road
- Role: Rider

Amateur team
- 2017: Gazprom–Rusvelo U23

Professional teams
- 2014: Russian Helicopters
- 2015–2016: RusVelo
- 2018: DFT Team
- 2019: D'Amico–UM Tools

Roman Kustadinchev (born August 3, 1995 in Krasnodar) is a Russian cyclist, who last rode for UCI Continental team D'Amico–UM Tools.

== Major results ==
2014
2nd Time trial, National Under-23 Road Championships
2nd Ruota d'Oro
2016
1st Sprints classification Boucles de la Mayenne
5th Ruota d'Oro
2017
National Road Championships

1st Team time trial
4th Under-23 road race
5th Under-23 time trial

1st Strade Bianche di Romagna
3rd Overall Friendship People North-Caucasus
2018
1st National Hill Climb Championships
2019
2nd Road race, National Cup of Russia
