= Gennady Tatarinov =

Russian cyclist (born 1991)

Personal information
- Born: 20 April 1991 (age 35) Kopeysk, Soviet Union

Cycling career
- Sport: Cycling
- Discipline: Road
- Role: Rider

Professional team
- 2013-2014: RusVelo

Gennady Tatarinov (born 20 April 1991 in Kopeysk) is a Russian cyclist who last rode for RusVelo.

== Major results ==
2009
2nd Giro della Lunigiana
2nd Overall 3 Giorni Orobica

1st Stage 1

2012
1st stages 1 (TTT) and 4 Tour d'Azerbaïdjan
7th Tour de l'Avenir
2013
3rd National U23 Road Race Championships
