= Aleksandr Komin (cyclist) =

Russian cyclist

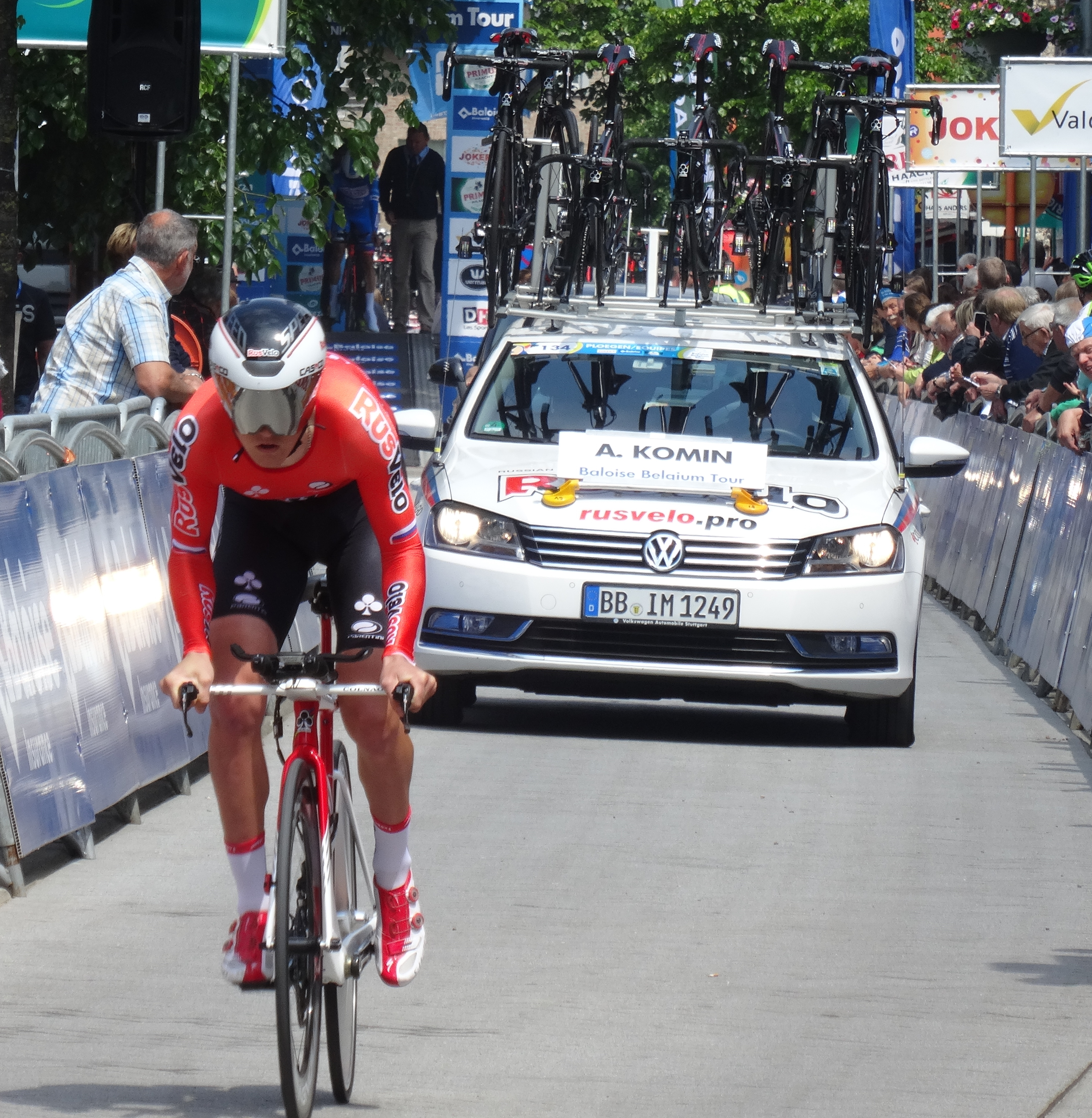
- Komin at the 2015 Tour of Belgium

Personal information
- Born: 12 April 1995 (age 31) Samara, Russia
- Height: 1.83 m (6 ft 0 in)
- Weight: 63 kg (139 lb)

Cycling career
- Sport: Cycling
- Current team: Samara Region
- Discipline: Road
- Role: Rider

Amateur teams
- 2016–2018: Samara Region
- 2021–: Samara Region

Professional teams
- 2014: Russian Helicopters
- 2015: RusVelo
- 2019–2021: Marathon–Tula

Aleksandr Komin (Russian: Александр Комин; born 12 April 1995) is a Russian road cyclist, who currently rides Russian amateur team Samara Region.

== Major results ==
2016
1st Overall Penza Stage Race

1st Stages 1 & 3

1st Stage 4 Udmurt Republic Stage Race
3rd Criterium, National Road Championships
2017
7th Overall Five Rings of Moscow
2018
1st Stage 1 Samara Stage Race
1st Stage 2 Izhevsk Stage Race
3rd Overall Udmurt Republic Stage Race

1st Stage 2

2019
7th Grand Prix Gazipasa
2020
6th Grand Prix Manavgat–Side
2021
10th Overall Five Rings of Moscow
