= 2016 Giro d'Italia =

2016 UCI World Tour, race 15 of 28
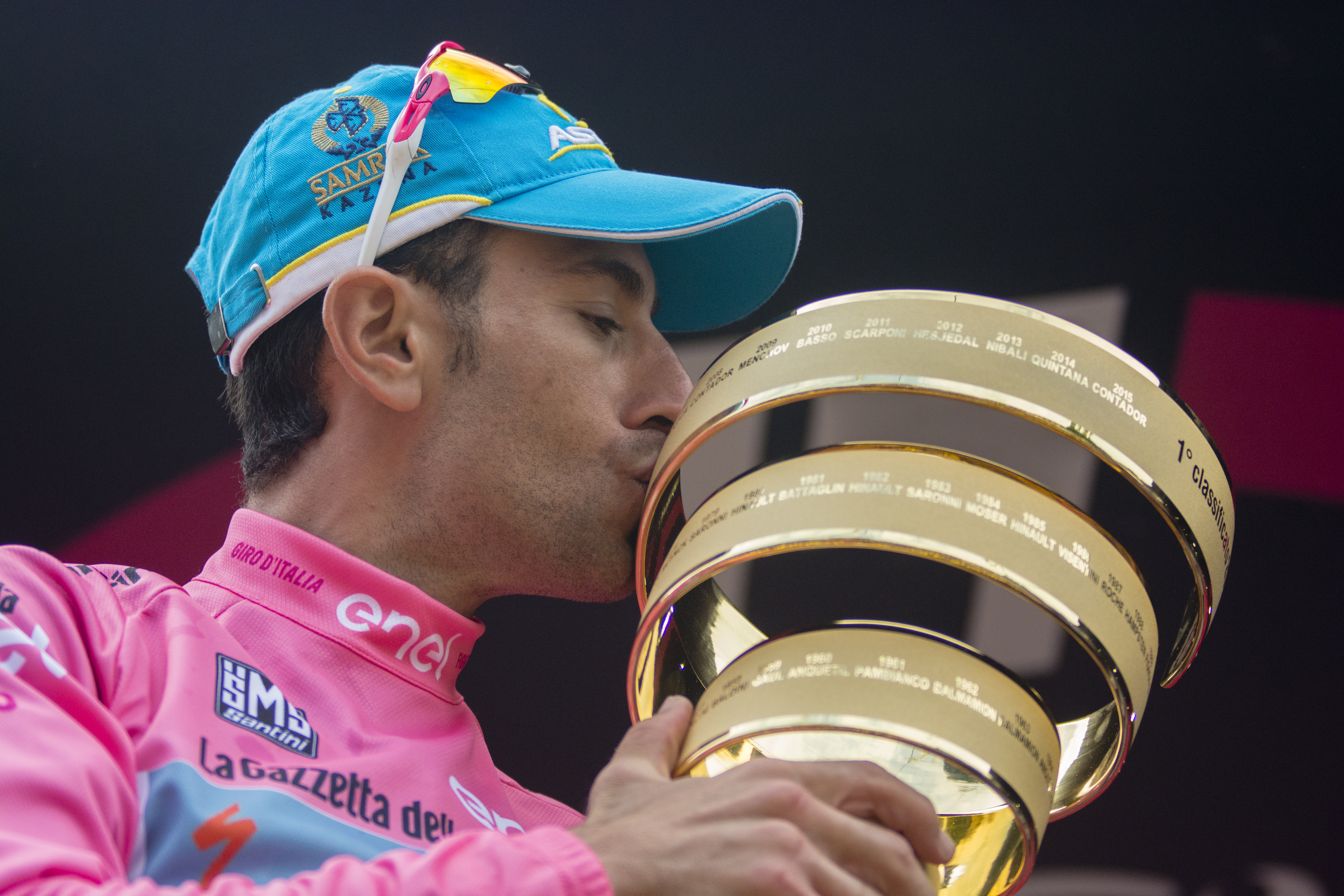
- Vincenzo Nibali, winner of the 2016 Giro d'Italia

Race details
- Dates: 6 May – 29 May 2016
- Stages: 21
- Distance: 3,467.1 km (2,154.4 mi)

Results
Jersey awarded to the overall winner	Winner	Vincenzo Nibali (ITA)	(Astana)
	Second	Esteban Chaves (COL)	(Orica–GreenEDGE)
	Third	Alejandro Valverde (ESP)	(Movistar Team)
Jersey awarded to the points classification winner	Points	Giacomo Nizzolo (ITA)	(Trek–Segafredo)
Jersey awarded to the mountains classification winner	Mountains	Mikel Nieve (ESP)	(Team Sky)
Jersey awarded to the young rider classification winner	Young rider	Bob Jungels (LUX)	(Etixx–Quick-Step)
	Sprints	Daniel Oss (ITA)	((BMC Racing Team)
Jersey awarded to the combativity classification winner	Combativity	Matteo Trentin (ITA)	(Etixx–Quick-Step)
	Team	Astana	
	Team points	Etixx–Quick-Step	

The 2016 Giro d'Italia was the 99th edition of the Giro d'Italia, one of cycling's Grand Tour races. The Giro started in Apeldoorn on 6 May with a 9.8 km (6 mi) individual time trial, followed by two other stages in the Netherlands, both between Nijmegen and Arnhem. After a rest day, there were 18 further stages to reach the finish on 29 May. These stages were principally in Italy, although two stages partly took place in France.

The overall winner was Italian rider Vincenzo Nibali of team Astana, who won his second Giro.

== Teams ==
All 18 UCI WorldTeams were automatically invited and were obliged to attend the race. The first wildcard invitation was secured at the end of the 2015 cycling season by Wilier Triestina–Southeast. While riding as Southeast Pro Cycling, they won the season-long Coppa Italia series; the winners of the series are automatically awarded an entry into the following year's Giro d'Italia. Two of the remaining three wildcard places were awarded to Italian teams (Bardiani–CSF and Nippo–Vini Fantini); the final place was awarded to the Russian team Gazprom–RusVelo. There were therefore 22 teams in the Giro, each of which consisted of nine riders; there are therefore 198 riders in the peloton at the beginning of the race.

UCI WorldTeams

- AG2R La Mondiale
- Astana
- BMC Racing Team
- Etixx–Quick-Step
- FDJ
- IAM Cycling
- Lampre–Merida
- Lotto–Soudal
- Movistar Team
- Team Giant–Alpecin
- Team Katusha
- LottoNL–Jumbo
- Team Dimension Data
- Team Sky
- Tinkoff
- Trek–Segafredo
- Orica–GreenEDGE
- Cannondale

UCI Professional Continental teams

- Bardiani–CSF
- Gazprom–RusVelo
- Nippo–Vini Fantini
- Wilier Triestina–Southeast

== Pre-race favorites ==
Pre-race favorites were Vincenzo Nibali, Mikel Landa, Alejandro Valverde, Ilnur Zakarin, Rigoberto Urán, Rafał Majka, Tom Dumoulin, Domenico Pozzovivo, Jakob Fuglsang.

== Route and stages ==
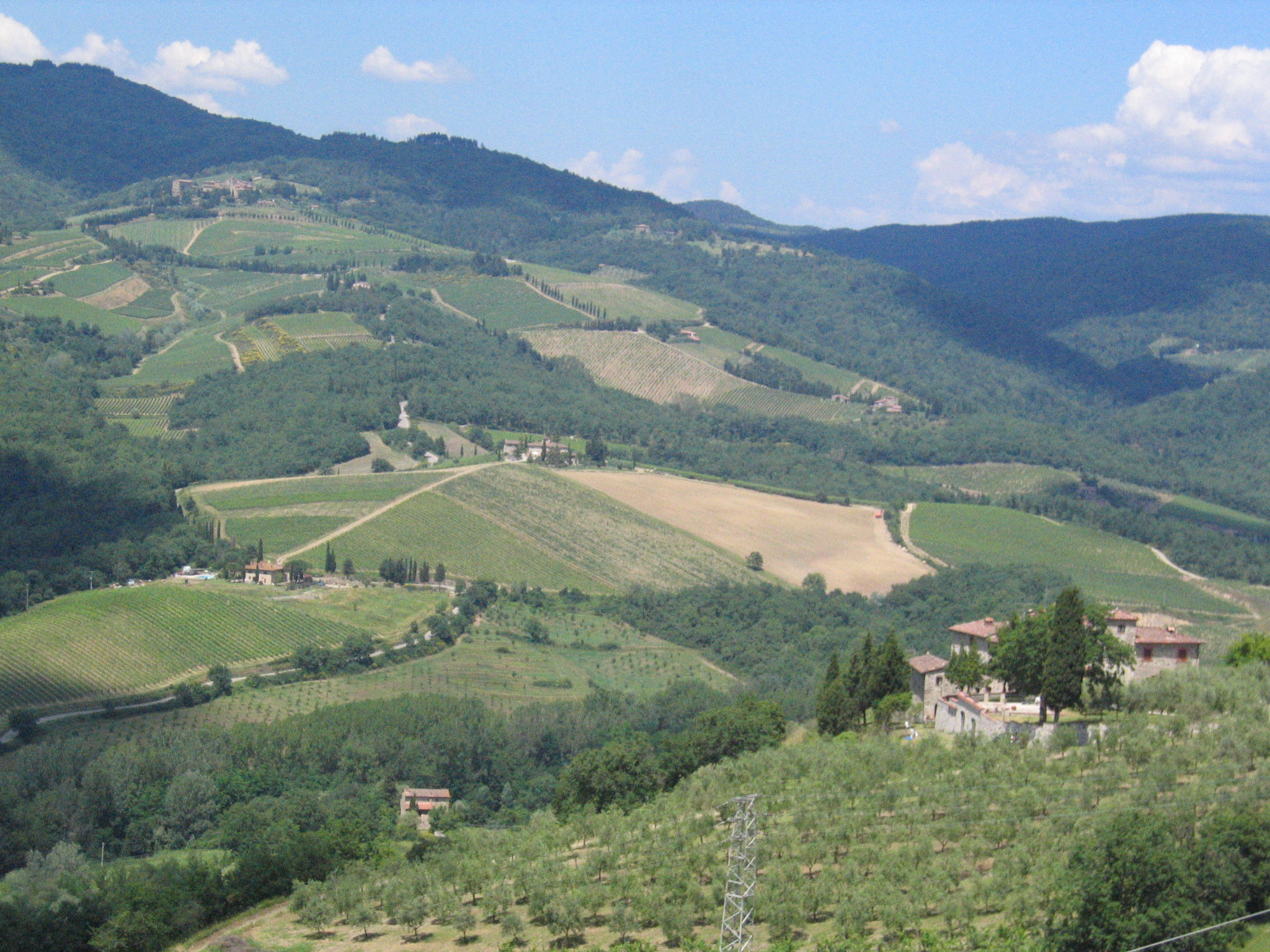
Vineyards in the Chianti region, location of the 40.4-kilometre (25.1 mi) individual time trial on Stage 9

Details about the start of the Giro were unveiled on 26 June 2015. It was confirmed that the Netherlands would hold its third Grande Partenza (Big Start) of the Giro, having previously hosted the opening stages of the 2002 and 2010 editions. The stages in the Netherlands will include an individual time trial on the opening day, followed by two road stages suitable for sprinters; to allow for the long transfer, there will be a rest day after the third stage. Stage 9, a 40.4-kilometre (25.1 mi) individual time trial, was announced at a press conference in London on 7 September 2015 and the mountainous Stage 13 was confirmed at a press conference on 21 September 2015. The remainder of the route was unveiled by the race director, Mauro Vegni, on 5 October 2015. After the three stages in the Netherlands, the race moves to Calabria in the south of Italy. The route generally takes the riders north, frequently visiting the Apennines, with stages in the mountains of Friuli and the Dolomites coming later in the race. The final and most difficult part of the Giro comes in the final week, with stages in the Alps.

After a series of moderately hilly stages, the first summit finish comes at the end of Stage 6. It is followed by two more hilly stages, the second of which includes a sterrato (dirt) climb in the final 25 kilometres (16 mi). The ninth stage is expected to be one of the most important for deciding the overall winner of the race: it is a 40.4-kilometre (25.1 mi) individual time trial through the Chianti region. The second rest day followed the time trial. After the rest day, Stage 10 includes the second summit finish of the race – although it was only a third-category climb – which came at the end of a very hilly second half of the stage. After two fairly flat stages, the race again enters the mountains towards the end of the second week, with the difficult Stage 13 ending with two mountains shortly before the finish in Cividale del Friuli. The second weekend takes place in the Dolomites: Stage 14 includes six major climbs, while Stage 15 is a 10.8-kilometre (6.7 mi) mountain time trial to Alpe di Siusi. After the final rest day, the third week of the Giro begins with a rolling stage that includes a climb in the final 5 kilometres (3.1 mi), then two more fairly flat days. Stages 19 and 20 again take the riders into the high mountains: Stage 19 finishes on the 12.8-kilometre (8.0 mi) climb of Risoul in France, then Stage 20 includes three first-category climbs on the way to another summit finish. The final stage takes place over a sprinter-friendly circuit in Turin.

After the start in the Netherlands, the Stages 19 and 20 leave Italy and visit France. In comparison with the previous year's race, the race was 14.7 kilometres (9 mi) shorter; it contained one more rest day and two more individual time trials. Unlike the previous edition, there was no team time trial.

List of stages
Stage	Date	Course	Distance	Type		Winner
1	6 May	Apeldoorn (Netherlands)	9.8 km (6 mi)		Individual time trial	Tom Dumoulin (NED)
2	7 May	Arnhem (Netherlands) – Nijmegen (Netherlands)	190 km (118 mi)		Flat stage	Marcel Kittel (GER)
3	8 May	Nijmegen (Netherlands) – Arnhem (Netherlands)	190 km (118 mi)		Flat stage	Marcel Kittel (GER)
	9 May	Rest day				
4	10 May	Catanzaro – Praia a Mare	200 km (124 mi)		Medium-mountain stage	Diego Ulissi (ITA)
5	11 May	Praia a Mare – Benevento	233 km (145 mi)		Hilly stage	André Greipel (GER)
6	12 May	Ponte – Roccaraso	157 km (98 mi)		Medium-mountain stage	Tim Wellens (BEL)
7	13 May	Sulmona – Foligno	211 km (131 mi)		Hilly stage	André Greipel (GER)
8	14 May	Foligno – Arezzo	186 km (116 mi)		Medium-mountain stage	Gianluca Brambilla (ITA)
9	15 May	Chianti Classico Stage; Radda in Chianti – Greve in Chianti	40.5 km (25 mi)		Individual time trial	Primož Roglič (SLO)
	16 May	Rest day				
10	17 May	Campi Bisenzio – Sestola	219 km (136 mi)		Medium-mountain stage	Giulio Ciccone (ITA)
11	18 May	Modena – Asolo	227 km (141 mi)		Medium-mountain stage	Diego Ulissi (ITA)
12	19 May	Noale – Bibione	182 km (113 mi)		Flat stage	André Greipel (GER)
13	20 May	Palmanova – Cividale del Friuli	170 km (106 mi)		Medium-mountain stage	Mikel Nieve (ESP)
14	21 May	Alpago (Farra) – Corvara (Alta Badia)	210 km (130 mi)		Mountain stage	Esteban Chaves (COL)
15	22 May	Castelrotto/Kastelruth – Alpe di Siusi/Seiser Alm	10.8 km (7 mi)	Mountain stage	Mountain time trial	Alexander Foliforov (RUS)
	23 May	Rest day				
16	24 May	Bressanone/Brixen – Andalo	132 km (82 mi)		Medium-mountain stage	Alejandro Valverde (ESP)
17	25 May	Molveno – Cassano d'Adda	196 km (122 mi)		Flat stage	Roger Kluge (GER)
18	26 May	Muggiò – Pinerolo	244 km (152 mi)		Medium-mountain stage	Matteo Trentin (ITA)
19	27 May	Pinerolo – Risoul (France)	162 km (101 mi)		Mountain stage	Vincenzo Nibali (ITA)
20	28 May	Guillestre (France) – Sant'Anna di Vinadio	134 km (83 mi)		Mountain stage	Rein Taaramäe (EST)
21	29 May	Cuneo – Turin	163 km (101 mi)		Flat stage	Nikias Arndt (GER)

== Race overview ==
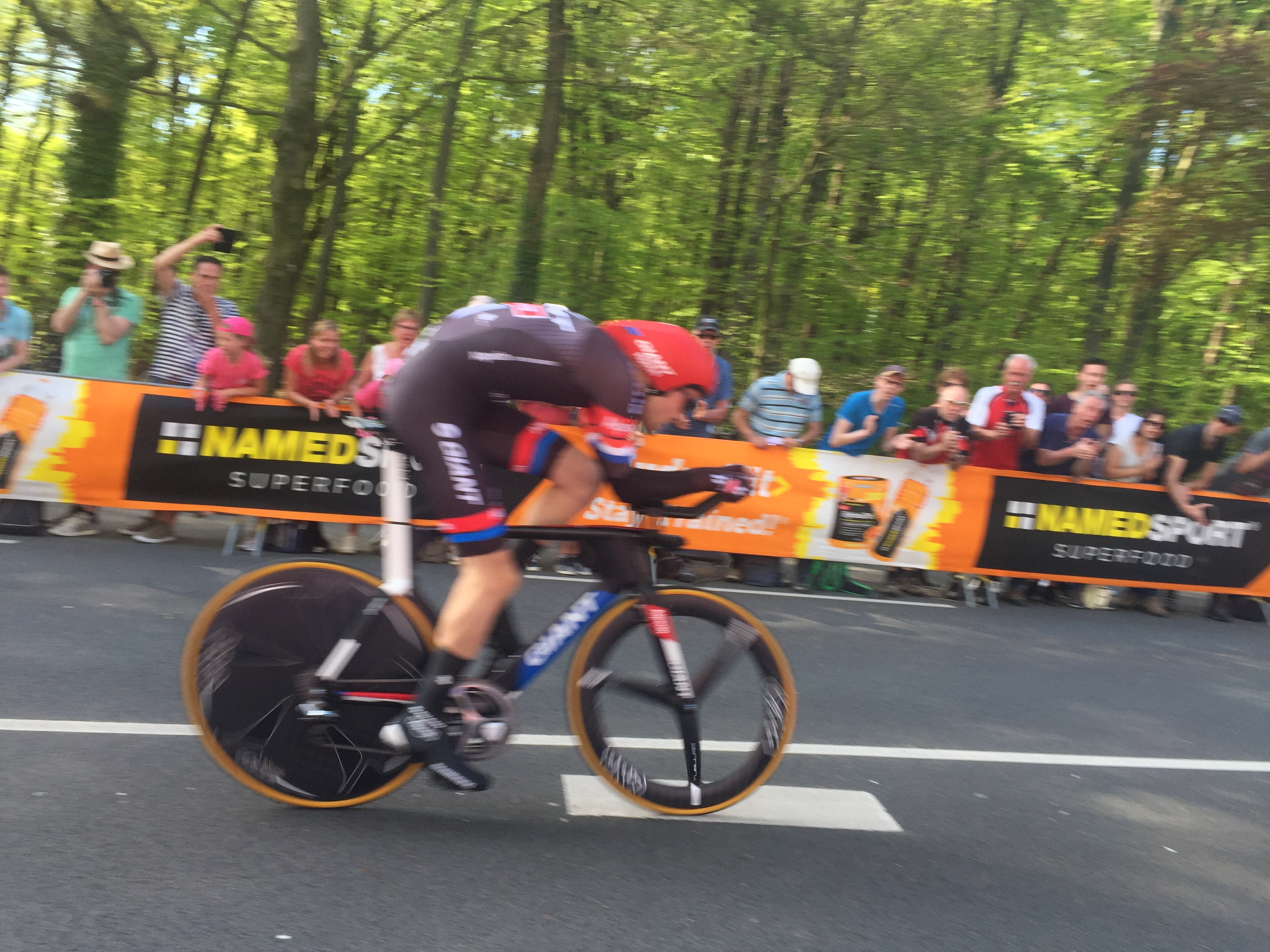
Tom Dumoulin won the first stage of the race and became the first leader.

The race began with an individual time trial in Apeldoorn. Fabian Cancellara was the favourite, aiming to become the leader of the Giro for the first time in his career. But a stomach bug left him eighth on the stage, and instead, home rider Tom Dumoulin powered through to win. He had the same time as second placed Primož Roglič, while Costa Rican rider, Andrey Amador, came in third, six seconds behind. Ultimately, the Dutchman took honours and collected the first Maglia Rosa of the race. The next two stages in the Netherlands, held between Nijmegen and Arnhem, were both won by Marcel Kittel. Having lost 11 seconds in the opening time trial, the two ten second time bonuses gave the German the pink jersey after the third stage.

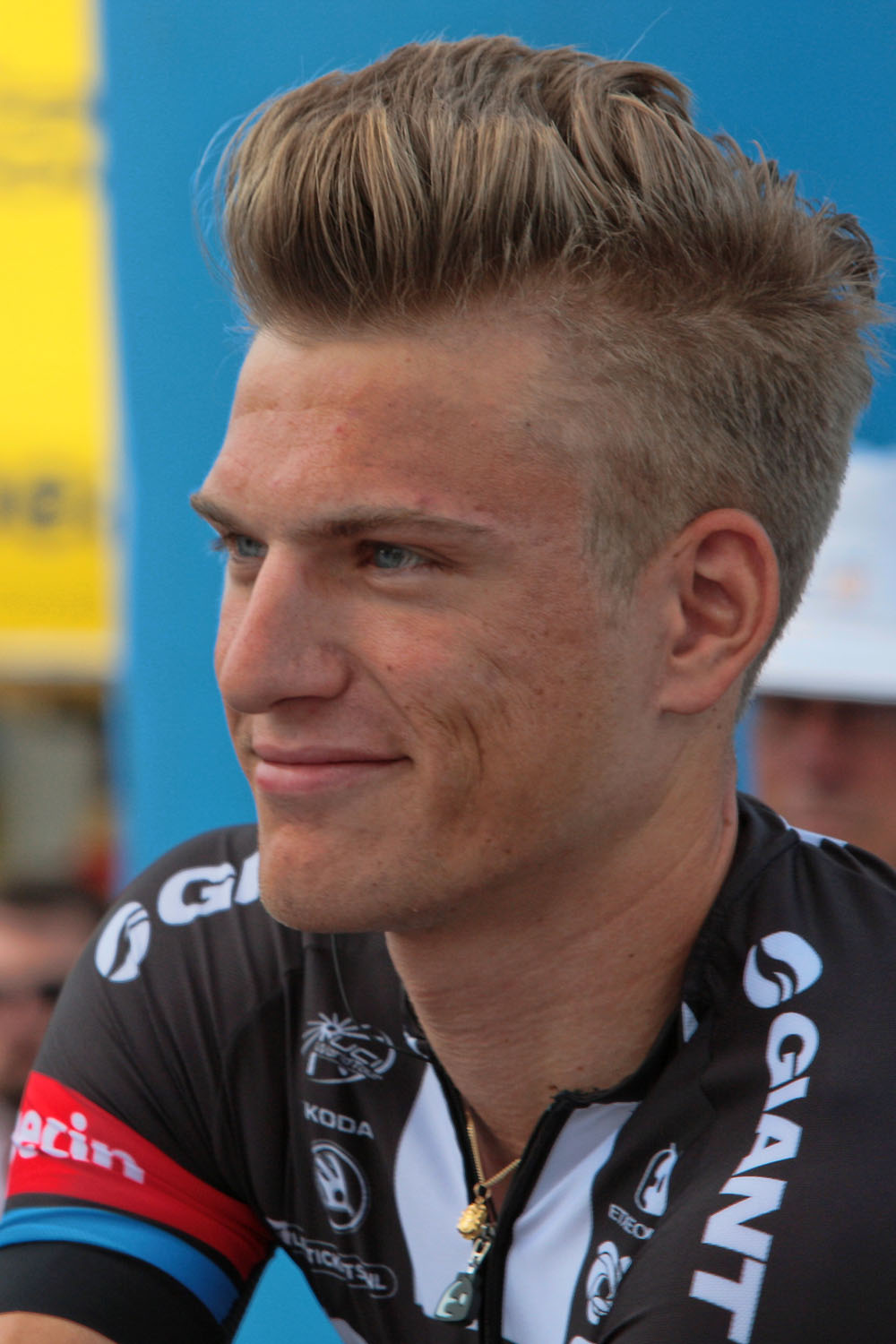
Marcel Kittel claimed two stages and was the race leader for one day.

After an early rest day, the race resumed in the south of Italy, with a hilly affair. Diego Ulissi took stage honours, after attacking on the final third category climb. Kittel was dropped on the same ascent and, together with Dumoulin's finish in second place, meant that the Dutchman regained the Maglia Rosa. Stage 5 was flat, and won by André Greipel. The sixth stage, however, was seen as an important one – it was the first summit finish of the Giro, in Roccaraso. It was won by Tim Wellens, who joined the successful breakaway partway through the stage. Amongst the GC contenders, Dumoulin gained approximately ten seconds over his rivals, and secured himself in the Maglia Rosa. Vincenzo Nibali lost seconds, due to bad team tactics from Astana. Greipel took stage 7, Lotto–Soudal's third consecutive victory.

Stage 8 featured the sterrato (dirt) climb of Alpe di Poti. Gianluca Brambilla took the victory in Arezzo. However, behind him, a battle amongst the general classification favourites commenced. Dumoulin was dropped, and lost a minute to the other favourites while Brambilla's advantage was sufficient to give him the pink jersey, the first Italian to wear it during the 2016 Giro. The next stage, the Chianti Classico Stage, was won by Roglič; his first ever victory in a Grand tour stage. The stage was held in falling rain, and this influenced the times of the GC favourites. Bob Jungels moved behind Brambilla, but failed to take the jersey, thanks to a one-second difference. Mikel Landa also moved forward in the general classification despite being expected to lose time. Stage 10 was the second summit finish, in Sestola, and was won by Giulio Ciccone. Landa climbed off after suffering from fever while Brambilla sacrificed his maglia rosa to work for his teammate, Jungels, who proceeded to take the maglia rosa at the day's end. Stage 11 was a fairly flat stage but there was a late fourth category climb where moves were expected to be made. Dumoulin, suffering from saddle sores, departed the Giro at the stage's feed zone while Amador attacked the favourites with 13 kilometers to go. Maglia rosa wearer, Jungels, tracked his move while Ulissi came back on the descent. The trio worked together to stay away with Ulissi winning the stage in the sprint while Jungels extended his lead further. The next stage was a flat stage, with Greipel winning his third stage in the race. Greipel, along with some sprinters, withdrew from the race after the stage.

The next few stages before the third rest day were expected to be crucial in terms of the GC. Stage 13 was won by Mikel Nieve of Team Sky while Jungels was dropped on the final ascent. Amador was also dropped briefly on the climb before coming back on the descent, taking the maglia rosa in the process as Jungels lost 50 seconds. Stage 14 was the queen stage of the race, featuring six categorized climbs before the descent to Corvara. Esteban Chaves took the stage honors after outsprinting Steven Kruijswijk, who took the maglia rosa, and Georg Preidler. Nibali lit up the fight for the GC on the final climb to Valparola, attacking with 27 kilometers to go. His attack dropped Amador and Alejandro Valverde, who both lost three minutes on the stage. Kruijswijk would attack close to the summit, with Chaves, after dropping Nibali, the only rider to keep up with him. Nibali lost more than half a minute after the stage. Stage 15 was the third individual time trial of the race, featuring the ascent to Alpe di Siusi. Alexander Foliforov surprised the GC favorites to win the stage, narrowly beating Kruijswijk by around a hundredth of a second. Kruijswijk extended his lead to more than two minutes over second-placed Chaves as Nibali suffered a mechanical on the climb, losing more than two minutes in the process. Stage 16 was a short stage which was won by Valverde, who outsprinted Kruijswijk on the line. Kruijswijk extended his lead in the general classification to three minutes as Chaves lost 42 seconds while Nibali cracked on the last climb. He lost almost two minutes to drop to fourth overall, almost five minutes down. Stage 17 was a pan flat stage, with Roger Kluge of IAM Cycling winning after surprising the remaining sprinters with an attack in the final kilometer. The win happened two days after his team announced its folding at the end of the season.

Stage 18 was another fairly flat stage but the stage included a late second category climb to Pramartino and the uncategorized ascent of San Maurizio. Matteo Trentin won from a breakaway while the GC contenders finished around 14 minutes behind. Stage 19 was the first to head into the high mountains, featuring the Cima Coppi, the Colle Dell'Agnello, and the summit finish to Risoul in France. Michele Scarponi took the Cima Coppi while Valverde, Ilnur Zakarin and Rafał Majka were dropped. On the descent, both Kruijswijk and Zakarin crashed with Zakarin suffered a broken collarbone and shoulder blade, forcing him to withdraw from the race. The day proved to be a redemption for Nibali as he won the stage after dropping Chaves on the climb to Risoul. Meanwhile, Kruijswijk crossed the line almost five minutes down on Nibali and more than four minutes behind Chaves. Chaves took the maglia rosa with a 44-second advantage over Nibali as Kruijswijk, who would later be diagnosed with a fractured rib, fell to third overall at a minute and five seconds behinds. Stage 20 was the final decisive stage in terms of the general classification, with three first category climbs on the menu and the steep third category climb to the finish at Sant'Anna di Vinadio. Nibali attack started 4 km to the summit of Lombarda, and reached the GPM 56 seconds ahead of Chaves. In the last 10 kilometers its progression was irresistible reaching the end of the stage at Sanctuary of Sant’Anna with 1’36" on Chaves, becoming the new and last maglia rosa of the giro d'Italia number 99. The podium was completed by Chaves, second, and Valverde.

== Classification leadership ==
In the Giro d'Italia, four different jerseys are awarded. The first and most important is the general classification, calculated by adding each rider's finishing times on each stage. Riders receive time bonuses (10, 6 and 4 seconds respectively) for finishing in the first three places on each stage (excluding the team time trial and individual time trial). The rider with the lowest cumulative time is awarded the pink jersey (the maglia rosa) and is considered the winner of the Giro d'Italia.

Additionally, there is a points classification. Riders win points for finishing in the top 15 on each stage. Flat stages award more points that mountainous stages, meaning that this classification tends to favour sprinters. In addition, points can be won in intermediate sprints. The winner of the points classification win the red jersey.

There is also a mountains classification. Points are awarded for reaching the top of a climb towards the front of the race. Each climb will be categorized as either first, second, third, or fourth-category, with more points available for the higher-categorized climbs. The Cima Coppi, the race's highest point of elevation, awards more points than the other first-category climbs. At 2,744 metres (9,003 ft), the Cima Coppi for the 2016 Giro d'Italia is the Col Agnel.

The fourth jersey represents the young rider classification. This is decided the same way as the general classification, but only riders born after 1 January 1991 are eligible. The winner of the classification is awarded a white jersey.

There are also two classifications for teams. In the Trofeo Fast Team classification, the times of the best three cyclists per team on each stage are added up; the leading team is one with the lowest total time. The Trofeo Super Team is a team points classification, with the top 20 riders of each stage earning points (20 for first place, 19 for second place and so on, down to a single point for 20th) for their team.

Classification leadership by stage
Stage	Winner	General classification	Points classification	Mountains classification	Young rider classification	Trofeo Fast Team	Trofeo Super Team
1	Tom Dumoulin	Tom Dumoulin	Tom Dumoulin	not awarded	Tobias Ludvigsson	Team Giant–Alpecin	Team Giant–Alpecin
2	Marcel Kittel	Tom Dumoulin	Marcel Kittel	Omar Fraile	Tobias Ludvigsson	Team Giant–Alpecin	Team Giant–Alpecin
3	Marcel Kittel	Marcel Kittel	Marcel Kittel	Maarten Tjallingii	Tobias Ludvigsson	Team Giant–Alpecin	Etixx–Quick-Step
4	Diego Ulissi	Tom Dumoulin	Marcel Kittel	Damiano Cunego	Bob Jungels	Astana	Etixx–Quick-Step
5	André Greipel	Tom Dumoulin	Marcel Kittel	Damiano Cunego	Bob Jungels	Astana	Etixx–Quick-Step
6	Tim Wellens	Tom Dumoulin	Marcel Kittel	Damiano Cunego	Bob Jungels	Astana	Etixx–Quick-Step
7	André Greipel	Tom Dumoulin	André Greipel	Tim Wellens	Bob Jungels	Astana	Lotto–Soudal
8	Gianluca Brambilla	Gianluca Brambilla	André Greipel	Tim Wellens	Bob Jungels	Etixx–Quick-Step	Etixx–Quick-Step
9	Primož Roglič	Gianluca Brambilla	André Greipel	Tim Wellens	Bob Jungels	Etixx–Quick-Step	Etixx–Quick-Step
10	Giulio Ciccone	Bob Jungels	André Greipel	Damiano Cunego	Bob Jungels	Movistar Team	Etixx–Quick-Step
11	Diego Ulissi	Bob Jungels	André Greipel	Damiano Cunego	Bob Jungels	Movistar Team	Etixx–Quick-Step
12	André Greipel	Bob Jungels	André Greipel	Damiano Cunego	Bob Jungels	Movistar Team	Etixx–Quick-Step
13	Mikel Nieve	Andrey Amador	Giacomo Nizzolo	Damiano Cunego	Bob Jungels	Movistar Team	Etixx–Quick-Step
14	Esteban Chaves	Steven Kruijswijk	Giacomo Nizzolo	Damiano Cunego	Bob Jungels	Astana	Etixx–Quick-Step
15	Alexander Foliforov	Steven Kruijswijk	Giacomo Nizzolo	Damiano Cunego	Bob Jungels	Astana	LottoNL–Jumbo
16	Alejandro Valverde	Steven Kruijswijk	Giacomo Nizzolo	Damiano Cunego	Bob Jungels	Astana	LottoNL–Jumbo
17	Roger Kluge	Steven Kruijswijk	Giacomo Nizzolo	Damiano Cunego	Bob Jungels	Astana	LottoNL–Jumbo
18	Matteo Trentin	Steven Kruijswijk	Giacomo Nizzolo	Damiano Cunego	Bob Jungels	Astana	Etixx–Quick-Step
19	Vincenzo Nibali	Esteban Chaves	Giacomo Nizzolo	Damiano Cunego	Bob Jungels	Astana	Etixx–Quick-Step
20	Rein Taaramäe	Vincenzo Nibali	Giacomo Nizzolo	Mikel Nieve	Bob Jungels	Astana	Etixx–Quick-Step
21	Nikias Arndt	Vincenzo Nibali	Giacomo Nizzolo	Mikel Nieve	Bob Jungels	Astana	Etixx–Quick-Step
Final		Vincenzo Nibali	Giacomo Nizzolo	Mikel Nieve	Bob Jungels	Astana	Etixx–Quick-Step

Notes

- In stage 2, Primož Roglič, who was second in the points classification, wore the red jersey, because Tom Dumoulin (in first place) wore the pink jersey as leader of the general classification during that stage.
- In stage 4, Elia Viviani, who was third in the points classification, wore the red jersey, because Marcel Kittel (in first place) wore the pink jersey as leader of the general classification and Maarten Tjallingii (in second place) wore the blue jersey as leader of the mountains classification during that stage.
- In stages 11–13, Davide Formolo, who was second in the youth classification, wore the white jersey, because Bob Jungels (in first place) wore the pink jersey as leader of the general classification during that stage.
- In stage 13, Giacomo Nizzolo, who was second in the points classification, wore the red jersey, because André Greipel (in first place) did not start that stage.

== Final standings ==
Legend
General classification	Denotes the leader of the General classification	Mountains classification	Denotes the leader of the Mountains classification
Points classification	Denotes the leader of the Points classification	Young rider classification	Denotes the leader of the Young rider classification

=== General classification ===
	Rider	Team	Time
1	Vincenzo Nibali (ITA)	Astana	86h 32' 49"
2	Esteban Chaves (COL)	Orica–GreenEDGE	+ 52"
3	Alejandro Valverde (ESP)	Movistar Team	+ 1' 17"
4	Steven Kruijswijk (NED)	LottoNL–Jumbo	+ 1' 50"
5	Rafał Majka (POL)	Tinkoff	+ 4' 37"
6	Bob Jungels (LUX)	Etixx–Quick-Step	+ 8' 31"
7	Rigoberto Urán (COL)	Cannondale	+ 11' 47"
8	Andrey Amador (CRC)	Movistar Team	+ 13' 21"
9	Darwin Atapuma (COL)	BMC Racing Team	+ 14' 09"
10	Kanstantsin Sivtsov (BLR)	Team Dimension Data	+ 16' 20"

=== Points classification ===
	Rider	Team	Points
1	Giacomo Nizzolo (ITA)	Trek–Segafredo	209
2	Matteo Trentin (ITA)	Etixx–Quick-Step	184
3	Sacha Modolo (ITA)	Lampre–Merida	163
4	Diego Ulissi (ITA)	Lampre–Merida	156
5	Daniel Oss (ITA)	BMC Racing Team	133
6	Maarten Tjallingii (NED)	LottoNL–Jumbo	103
7	Alejandro Valverde (ESP)	Movistar Team	92
8	Nikias Arndt (GER)	Team Giant–Alpecin	88
9	Alexander Porsev (RUS)	Team Katusha	80
10	Steven Kruijswijk (NED)	LottoNL–Jumbo	76

=== Mountains classification ===
	Rider	Team	Points
1	Mikel Nieve (ESP)	Team Sky	152
2	Damiano Cunego (ITA)	Nippo–Vini Fantini	134
3	Darwin Atapuma (COL)	BMC Racing Team	118
4	Stefan Denifl (AUT)	IAM Cycling	109
5	Giovanni Visconti (ITA)	Movistar Team	77
6	Alexander Foliforov (RUS)	Gazprom–RusVelo	66
7	Rein Taaramäe (EST)	Team Katusha	62
8	David López (ESP)	Team Sky	54
9	Michele Scarponi (ITA)	Astana	51
10	Steven Kruijswijk (NED)	LottoNL–Jumbo	42

=== Young rider classification ===
	Rider	Team	Time
1	Bob Jungels (LUX)	Etixx–Quick-Step	86h 41' 20"
2	Sebastián Henao (COL)	Team Sky	+ 29' 38"
3	Valerio Conti (ITA)	Lampre–Merida	+ 1h 10' 07"
4	Davide Formolo (ITA)	Cannondale	+ 1h 18' 48"
5	Joe Dombrowski (USA)	Cannondale	+ 1h 24' 25"
6	Merhawi Kudus (ERI)	Team Dimension Data	+ 1h 46' 03"
7	Carlos Verona (ESP)	Etixx–Quick-Step	+ 1h 57' 26"
8	Alexander Foliforov (RUS)	Gazprom–RusVelo	+ 1h 58' 06"
9	Nathan Brown (USA)	Cannondale	+ 2h 06' 47"
10	Tobias Ludvigsson (SWE)	Team Giant–Alpecin	+ 2h 12' 42"

=== Trofeo Fast Team ===
	Team	Time
1	(Kazakhstan) Astana	260h 02' 35"
2	(United States) Cannondale	+ 6' 57"
3	(Spain) Movistar Team	+ 21' 00"
4	(France) AG2R La Mondiale	+ 53' 52"
5	(United Kingdom) Team Sky	+ 1h 04' 21"
6	(Belgium) Etixx–Quick-Step	+ 1h 37' 53"
7	(Russia) Tinkoff	+ 1h 40' 44"
8	(Russia) Team Katusha	+ 2h 06' 36"
9	(South Africa) Team Dimension Data	+ 2h 53' 26"
10	(Italy) Lampre–Merida	+ 3h 15' 00"

=== Trofeo Super Team ===
	Team	Points
1	(Belgium) Etixx–Quick-Step	506
2	(Netherlands) LottoNL–Jumbo	397
3	(Italy) Lampre–Merida	361
4	(Spain) Movistar Team	339
5	(Belgium) Lotto–Soudal	303
6	(Russia) Team Katusha	293
7	(Germany) Team Giant–Alpecin	280
8	(United States) BMC Racing Team	232
9	(Australia) Orica–GreenEDGE	220
10	(United States) Trek–Segafredo	216

=== Minor classifications ===
Several other minor classifications are awarded. The first is the intermediate sprint classification. Each road stage has two sprints – the Traguardi Volanti. The first riders across the intermediate sprint lines are awarded points; the rider with the most points at the end of the race wins the classification. This classification was won by Daniel Oss (BMC Racing Team). Another classification – the combativity prize (Italian: Premio Combattività) – involves points awarded to the first riders at the stage finishes, at intermediate sprints, and at the summits of categorised climbs. It was won by Matteo Trentin (Etixx–Quick-Step). There is also a breakaway award (Italian: Premio della Fuga). For this, points are awarded to each rider in any breakaway smaller than 10 riders that escapes for at least 5 kilometres (3.1 mi). Each rider is awarded a point for each kilometre that the rider was away from the peloton. The rider with the most points at the end of the Giro wins the award. It was also won by Daniel Oss (BMC Racing Team). The final classification is a "fair play" ranking for each team. Teams are given penalty points for infringing various rules. These range from half-point penalties, for offences that merit warnings from race officials, to a 2000-point penalty, for a positive doping test. The team that has the lowest points total at the end of the Giro wins the classification. It was won by LottoNL–Jumbo that did not receive any penalty points during the Giro, like 4 other teams. However, out of all of them, they had the highest placed rider in the general classification.
