= Maykop–Ulyap–Maykop =

Russian one-day road cycling race

Race details
- Date: April
- Region: Russia
- Discipline: Road race
- Competition: UCI Europe Tour
- Type: One-day race

History
- First edition: 2015
- Editions: 1
- Final edition: 2015
- First winner: Ivan Balykin (RUS)
- Final winner: Ivan Balykin (RUS)

Maykop–Ulyap–Maykop was a road bicycle race held in 2015 in Russia, as part of the 2015 UCI Europe Tour. The race was won by Russia's Ivan Balykin.

== Winners ==
| Year | Country | Rider | Team |
|---|---|---|---|
| 2015 | Russia | Ivan Balykin | RusVelo |
