= Grand Prix of Sochi Mayor =

Russian one-day road cycling race

Race details
- Date: March
- Region: Sochi, Russia
- Discipline: Road
- Type: One day race
- Web site: sochi.fvsr.ru/en/

History
- First edition: 2015
- Editions: 1
- Final edition: 2015
- First winner: Sergey Firsanov (RUS)
- Most wins: No repeat winners
- Final winner: Sergey Firsanov (RUS)

Grand Prix of Sochi Mayor was a men's one-day cycle race, held in Russia in 2015. It was rated by the UCI as 1.2 and formed part of the 2015 UCI Europe Tour.

== Winners ==
Year	Country	Rider	Team
2015	Russia	Sergey Firsanov	RusVelo
