= Grand Prix of Sochi =

Russian multi-day road cycling race

Race details
- Date: March/April
- Region: Sochi, Russia
- Discipline: Road race
- Competition: UCI Europe Tour
- Type: Stage race
- Race director: Robert Abramyan

History
- Final edition: 2015
- First winner: Alexander Khatuntsev (RUS)
- Most wins: No repeat winners
- Final winner: Alexander Foliforov (RUS)

The Grand Prix of Sochi was an annual road cycling stage race held annually in Sochi, Russia until 2015. It was part of the UCI Europe Tour as a 2.2 category race. No rider has had more than one victory in this event.

== Past winners ==
Year	Country	Rider	Team
2005	Russia	Alexander Khatuntsev	Russia national team
2006	Russia	Sergey Kolesnikov	Omnibike Dynamo Moscow
2007	Russia	Alexey Shmidt	Moscow Stars
2008	Germany	Dirk Müller	Team Sparkasse
2009	No race		
2010	Ukraine	Vitaly Popkov	ISD Continental Team
2011	Germany	Björn Schröder	Team Nutrixxion–Sparkasse
2012	Serbia	Ivan Stević	Salcano–Arnavutkoy
2013	Ukraine	Vitaliy Buts	Kolss Cycling Team
2014	Russia	Ilnur Zakarin	RusVelo
2015	Russia	Alexander Foliforov	RusVelo
