= List of 2026 UCI ProTeams and Continental teams =

List of cycling teams

The Union Cycliste Internationale (UCI) – the governing body of cycling – categorizes teams into three divisions. The first division, consisting of the top 18 teams, is classified as UCI WorldTeams, and competes in the UCI World Tour. The second and third divisions, respectively, are the ProTeams (formerly known as Professional Continental teams) and the Continental teams.

== 2026 UCI ProTeams ==
According to the UCI Rulebook,

A UCI ProTeam is an organisation created to take part in road events open to UCI ProTeams . . . [and] is known by a unique name and registered with the UCI in accordance with the provisions below.

- The UCI ProTeam comprises all the riders registered with the UCI as members of the team, the paying agent, the sponsors and all other persons contracted by the paying agent and/or the sponsors to provide for the operation of the team (manager, sports director, coach, paramedical assistant, mechanic, etc.).
- Each ProTeam must employ at least 20 riders, 3 team managers and 5 other staff (paramedical assistants, mechanics, etc.) on a full time basis to be eligible for the whole registration year.

ProTeams compete in the UCI Continental Circuits, which are divided into five continental zones: Africa, America, Asia, Europe, and Oceania. Sometimes, teams are also invited to participate in UCI World Tour and UCI ProSeries events, usually through wildcard invitations, although they are not eligible to win points in the World Tour rankings.

Code	Official Team Name	Country	Continent
BCS	Bardiani–CSF 7 Saber	Italy	Europe
BBH	Burgos Burpellet BH	Spain	Europe
CJR	Caja Rural–Seguros RGA	Spain	Europe
COF	Cofidis	France	Europe
EKP	Equipo Kern Pharma	Spain	Europe
EUS	Euskaltel–Euskadi	Spain	Europe
MBH	MBH Bank CSB Telecom Fort	Hungary	Europe
MAP	Modern Adventure Pro Cycling	United States	America
PQT	Pinarello–Q36.5 Pro Cycling Team	Switzerland	Europe
TFT	Solution Tech NIPPO Rali	Italy	Europe
TFB	Team Flanders–Baloise	Belgium	Europe
TNN	Team Novo Nordisk	United States	America
PTV	Team Polti VisitMalta	Italy	Europe
TEN	Team TotalEnergies	France	Europe
TUD	Tudor Pro Cycling Team	Switzerland	Europe
URR	Unibet Rose Rockets	France	Europe

== 2026 UCI Continental teams ==
According to the UCI Rulebook,

A UCI continental team or UCI women’s continental team is a team of road riders recognised and certified by the National Federation of the nationality of the majority of its riders to take part in road events on the international calendars.

- A UCI Continental team or UCI women's continental team will comprise riders who may or may not be professional, in the elite and/or under 23 categories. It must have minimum 10 riders for UCI continental teams, 8 for UCI women’s continental teams and a maximum of 16 riders for both categories.
- However, a UCI continental team shall also have the right to add up to 4 riders specialising in other endurance cycling disciplines (cyclo-cross; mountain bike: cross country; track: points race, scratch, pursuit, omnium) as long as the riders in question are among the top 150 of the last final UCI individual classification.

Continental teams, the third division of the UCI cycling pyramid, compete almost exclusively in the UCI Continental Circuits while sometimes getting wildcard invitations to UCI ProSeries events as well.

As of 3 March 2026

Code	Official Team Name	Country	Continent
MPT	Madar Pro Cycling Team	Algeria	Africa
MCA	Mouloudia Club d'Alger	Algeria	Africa
A6C	Atom 6 Bikes–Cycleur de Luxe–Auto Stroo Continental Team	Australia	Oceania
CBW	CCACHE x BODYWRAP	Australia	Oceania
HBG	Hagens Berman Jayco	Australia	Oceania
STG	St George Continental Cycling Team	Australia	Oceania
TBN	Team Brennan	Australia	Oceania
FAS	ARBÖ Kärnten Sport Feld am See	Austria	Europe
HAC	Hrinkow Advarics	Austria	Europe
SIC	Schwingshandl Intralogistics	Austria	Europe
VBG	Team Vorarlberg	Austria	Europe
TIR	Tirol KTM Cycling Team	Austria	Europe
WSA	WSA KTM Graz	Austria	Europe
BVD	Bahrain Victorious Development Team	Bahrain	Asia
AAR	Aarco	Belgium	Europe
APD	Alpecin–Premier Tech Development Team	Belgium	Europe
BPL	Baloise Verzekeringen–Het Poetsbureau Lions	Belgium	Europe
CCA	Color Code–Alu Center	Belgium	Europe
LWD	Lotto–Groupe Wanty	Belgium	Europe
SQD	Soudal–Quick-Step Devo Team	Belgium	Europe
TIS	Tarteletto–Isorex	Belgium	Europe
PRC	Pío Rico Cycling Team	Bolivia	America
LMS	Localiza Meoo / Swift Pro Cycling	Brazil	America
HUS	Hustle Pro Cycling	Canada	America
PPZ	Plus Performance–ZEO Sport	Chile	America
BDR	Bodywrap LTwoo Cycling Team	China	Asia
CCT	Camp Cycling Team	China	Asia
CAT	China Anta–Mentech Cycling Team	China	Asia
CNM	China Chermin Cycling Team	China	Asia
FNX	FNIX–SCOM–Hengxiang Cycling Team	China	Asia
MSS	Giant Cycling Team	China	Asia
HST	Huansheng–Vonoa–Taishan Sport Cycling Team	China	Asia
LNS	Li-Ning Star	China	Asia
PIT	Pingtan International Tourism Island Cycling Team	China	Asia
TYD	Qinghai Tianyoude Hotel Cycling Team	China	Asia
XDS	Shenzhen Gineyea–Xidesheng Cycling Team	China	Asia
KSZ	Shenzhen Kung Cycling Team	China	Asia
THT	The Joyrun & Hurricane Cycling Team	China	Asia
CDT	Wheeltop Rotor Chengdu Team	China	Asia
GES	GW Erco SportFitness	Colombia	America
TNC	Nu Colombia	Colombia	America
MED	Team Medellín–EPM	Colombia	America
ESC	Team Sistecredito	Colombia	America
ATT	ATT Investments	Czech Republic	Europe
FGI	Fany Gastro_Integray_L27	Czech Republic	Europe
FVB	Favorit Brno	Czech Republic	Europe
KCR	Kasper Crypto4me	Czech Republic	Europe
SKC	TUFO–Pardus Prostějov	Czech Republic	Europe
GSH	Airtox–Carl Ras	Denmark	Europe
BPC	BHS–PL Beton Bornholm	Denmark	Europe
TCQ	Team ColoQuick	Denmark	Europe
TGS	Team Give Steel	Denmark	Europe
BES	Best PC Ecuador	Ecuador	America
QPT	Quick Pro Team	Estonia	Europe
UNC	UN Cycling Team	Finland	Europe
AIX	AVC Aix Provence Dole	France	Europe
BAC	Bourg-en-Bresse Ain Cyclisme	France	Europe
CIC	CIC Pro Cycling Academy	France	Europe
DCD	Decathlon–CMA CGM Development Team	France	Europe
CGF	Groupama–FDJ United Continental Team	France	Europe
NMC	Nice Métropole Côte d'Azur	France	Europe
SCO	SCO Dijon–Team Matériel-Velo.com	France	Europe
AUB	St. Michel–Preference Home–Auber93	France	Europe
VRR	Van Rysel–Roubaix	France	Europe
VVB	Vélo Club Villefranche Beaujolais	France	Europe
VCR	Véloce Club Rouen 76	France	Europe
VDU	Vendée U Primeo Energie	France	Europe
BUB	Benotti Berthold	Germany	Europe
BAI	Bike Aid	Germany	Europe
LTF	Lidl–Trek Future Racing	Germany	Europe
MRT	MaxSolar–Raymon	Germany	Europe
RBC	Red Bull–Bora–Hansgrohe Rookies	Germany	Europe
RRN	Rembe / Rad-Net	Germany	Europe
RRS	Run & Race–Solarpur	Germany	Europe
LKH	Team Lotto–Kern Haus Outlet Montabaur	Germany	Europe
TSM	Team Storck–MRW BAU	Germany	Europe
IGA	INEOS Grenadiers Racing Academy	Great Britain	Europe
PPI	P.A.S. Ioanninon–P&I	Greece	Europe
ECT	EuroCyclingTrips–CCN	Guam	Oceania
HIN	Hino One La Red Suzuki	Guatemala	America
HKS	HKSI Pro Cycling Team	Hong Kong	Asia
TUS	Team United Shipping	Hungary	Europe
ASC	ASC Monsters Indonesia	Indonesia	Asia
JPC	Jakarta Pro Cycling Team	Indonesia	Asia
NCT	Nusantara Cycling Team	Indonesia	Asia
CTT	Crown Tabriz Team	Iran	Asia
DFT	Navihood DFT CCN	Iran	Asia
BTC	Beltrami TSA–Tre Colli	Italy	Europe
BIE	Biesse–Carrera–Premac	Italy	Europe
CMP	Campana Imballaggi–Morbiato–Trentino	Italy	Europe
GEF	General Store–Essegibi–Fratelli Curia	Italy	Europe
GSC	Gragnano Sporting Club	Italy	Europe
MGK	MG.K Vis Costruzioni e Ambiente	Italy	Europe
PAD	S.C. Padovani Polo Cherry Bank	Italy	Europe
SOA	Solme–Olmo–Arvedi	Italy	Europe
SWT	Swatt Club	Italy	Europe
TFD	Team Nippo Nuovacomauto Obor	Italy	Europe
TER	Team Technipes #inEmiliaRomagna Caffè Borbone	Italy	Europe
UTC	U.C. Trevigiani Energiapura Marchiol	Italy	Europe
IPD	Vega–Vitalcare–Dynatek	Italy	Europe
ART	Aisan Racing Team	Japan	Asia
ABZ	Astemo Utsunomiya Blitzen	Japan	Asia
KIN	Kinan Racing Team	Japan	Asia
LVF	Levante Fuji Shizuoka	Japan	Asia
SMN	Shimano Racing Team	Japan	Asia
SPA	Sparkle Oita Racing Team	Japan	Asia
TUK	Team Ukyo	Japan	Asia
VCF	VC Fukuoka	Japan	Asia
VCH	Victoire Hiroshima	Japan	Asia
ALM	Almaty Continental Team	Kazakhstan	Asia
VNQ	Team Vino–North Qazaqstan Region	Kazakhstan	Asia
XAD	XDS Astana Development Team	Kazakhstan	Asia
CLN	CLN–Kosova	Kosovo	Europe
BCT	Bishkek Cycling Team	Kyrgyzstan	Asia
LOM	Lokomotiv Manas	Kyrgyzstan	Asia
ENT	Energus Cycling Team	Lithuania	Europe
MPC	Malaysia Pro Cycling	Malaysia	Asia
TSG	Terengganu Cycling Team	Malaysia	Asia
CAJ	Canel's–Java	Mexico	America
PTL	Petrolike	Mexico	America
SUS	Sidi Ali–Unlock Sports Team	Morocco	Africa
BCY	BEAT CC p/b Saxo	Netherlands	Europe
DPP	Development Team Picnic–PostNL	Netherlands	Europe
EEW	EEW–VDK Cyclingteam	Netherlands	Europe
MET	Metec–Solarwatt p/b Mantel	Netherlands	Europe
AVV	Azerion / Villa Valkenburg	Netherlands	Europe
VLD	Visma–Lease a Bike Development	Netherlands	Europe
UNI	Universe Cycling Team	Netherlands	Europe
VWE	VolkerWessels Cycling Team	Netherlands	Europe
NZP	Whoosh–NZ Cycling Project	New Zealand	Oceania
LCT	Lillehammer CK Continental Team	Norway	Europe
DRP	Team Drali–Repsol	Norway	Europe
RSK	Team Ringerike	Norway	Europe
7RP	7 Eleven–Cliqq Roadbike Philippines	Philippines	Asia
G4G	Go for Gold Philippines	Philippines	Asia
VSC	Victoria Sports Pro Cycling	Philippines	Asia
MSP	Mazowsze Serce Polski	Poland	Europe
VOS	Voster Team	Poland	Europe
LPP	Wibatech Lubelskie Perła Polski	Poland	Europe
ACR	Anicolor / Campicarn	Portugal	Europe
ALL	Aviludo–Louletano–Loulé	Portugal	Europe
LAA	Credibom / LA Alumínios / Marcos Car	Portugal	Europe
EFL	Efapel Cycling	Portugal	Europe
BOA	Feira dos Sofás–Boavista	Portugal	Europe
CDF	Feirense–Beeceler	Portugal	Europe
GSU	GI Group Holding–Simoldes–UDO	Portugal	Europe
OCT	Óbidos Cycling Team	Portugal	Europe
TAV	Tavfer–Ovos Matinados–Mortágua	Portugal	Europe
TTA	Team Tavira / Crédito Agrícola	Portugal	Europe
MEN	MENtoRISE Teem CCN	Romania	Europe
BBT	Benediction Banafrica Team	Rwanda	Africa
MSR	May Stars	Rwanda	Africa
AMN	Team Amani	Rwanda	Africa
DKB	Dukla Banská Bystrica	Slovakia	Europe
FRT	Factor Racing	Slovenia	Europe
ADR	Kolesarski Klub Novo Mesto	Slovenia	Europe
PGL	Pogi Team Gusto Ljubljana	Slovenia	Europe
TPC	Tshenolo Pro Cycling Team	South Africa	Africa
KSP	KSPO	South Korea	Asia
LXC	LX Cycling Team	South Korea	Asia
SCT	Seoul Cycling Team	South Korea	Asia
MOY	Movistar Team Academy	Spain	Europe
LUC	Lucky Sport Cycling Team	Sweden	Europe
EFC	Elite Fondations Cycling Team	Switzerland	Europe
NDT	NSN Development Team	Switzerland	Europe
TUU	Tudor Pro Cycling Team U23	Switzerland	Europe
GTC	Grant Thornton Cycling Team	Thailand	Asia
ROI	Roojai Insurance Winspace	Thailand	Asia
TCC	Thailand Continental Cycling Team	Thailand	Asia
IST	Istanbul Cycling Team	Turkey	Europe
KBB	Konya Büyükşehir Belediyespor	Turkey	Europe
BKC	Muğla Büyükşehir Belediyesi Spor Kulübü	Turkey	Europe
STC	Spor Toto Cycling Team	Turkey	Europe
CTU	Ukraine Cycling Team	Ukraine	Europe
UAZ	UAE Team Emirates Gen Z	United Arab Emirates	Asia
APS	APS Pro Cycling by Team Cadence Cyclery	United States	America
CER	Competitive Edge Racing	United States	America
EFA	EF Education–Aevolo	United States	America
LLA	L39ION of Los Angeles	United States	America
MUZ	Meridian Racing p/b de la Uz	United States	America
PEC	Project Echelon Racing	United States	America
TND	Team Novo Nordisk Development	United States	America
TSL	Team Skyline	United States	America
SAB	7 Saber Uzbekistan Cycling Team	Uzbekistan	Asia

Preceded by 2025	List of UCI ProTeams and Continental teams 2026	Succeeded by 2027
