= 2025 Team Picnic–PostNL (men's team) season =

Team Picnic–PostNL
- 2025 season
- UCI code: TPP
- Status: UCI WorldTeam
- Manager: Iwan Spekenbrink (NED)
- Main sponsor(s): Picnic; PostNL
- Based: Netherlands
- Bicycles: Lapierre
- Groupset: Shimano

Season victories
- One-day races: 2
- Stage race stages: 2
- Most wins: (Denmark) Tobias Lund Andresen (Netherlands) Nils Eekhoff (Netherlands) Casper van Uden (United Kingdom) Oscar Onley (1 win each)

The 2025 season for the Team Picnic–PostNL is the 21st season in the team's existence and its 13th as a UCI WorldTeam.

== Team roster ==
As of 7 January 2025.

Rider	Date of birth
Tobias Lund Andresen (DEN)	20 August 2002 (aged 22)
Romain Bardet (FRA)	9 November 1990 (aged 34)
Warren Barguil (FRA)	28 October 1991 (aged 33)
Pavel Bittner (CZE)	29 October 2002 (aged 22)
Romain Combaud (FRA)	1 April 1991 (aged 33)
John Degenkolb (GER)	7 January 1989 (aged 35)
Robbe Dhondt (BEL)	25 June 2004 (aged 20)
Matthew Dinham (AUS)	9 April 2000 (aged 24)
Patrick Eddy (AUS)	17 October 2002 (aged 22)
Alex Edmondson (AUS)	22 December 1993 (aged 31)
Nils Eekhoff (NED)	23 January 1998 (aged 26)
Sean Flynn (GBR)	2 March 2000 (aged 24)
Chris Hamilton (AUS)	18 May 1995 (aged 29)
Fabio Jakobsen (NED)	31 August 1996 (aged 28)

Rider	Date of birth
Bjoern Koerdt (GBR)	20 July 2004 (aged 20)
Gijs Leemreize (NED)	23 October 1999 (aged 25)
Enzo Leijnse (NED)	16 July 2001 (aged 23)
Niklas Märkl (GER)	3 March 1999 (aged 25)
Juan Guillermo Martínez (COL)	21 November 2004 (aged 20)
Tim Naberman (NED)	11 May 1999 (aged 25)
Oscar Onley (GBR)	13 October 2002 (aged 22)
Max Poole (GBR)	1 March 2003 (aged 21)
Timo Roosen (NED)	11 January 1993 (aged 31)
Julius van den Berg (NED)	23 October 1996 (aged 28)
Frank van den Broek (NED)	28 December 2000 (aged 24)
Casper van Uden (NED)	22 July 2001 (aged 23)
Kevin Vermaerke (USA)	16 October 2000 (aged 24)
Bram Welten (NED)	29 March 1997 (aged 27)

== Season victories ==
Date	Race	Competition	Rider	Country	Location	Ref.
30 January	Surf Coast Classic	UCI Oceania Tour	Tobias Lund Andresen (DEN)	Australia	Torquay	
19 March	Nokere Koerse	UCI ProSeries	Nils Eekhoff (NED)	Belgium	Nokere	
13 May	Giro d'Italia, stage 4	UCI World Tour	Casper van Uden (NED)	Italy	Lecce	
19 June	Tour de Suisse, stage 5	UCI World Tour	Oscar Onley (GBR)	Switzerland	Santa Maria in Calanca	
