= List of wins by Team Katusha and its successors =

This is a comprehensive list of victories of the Team Katusha–Alpecin cycling team.

== Seasons ==
=== 2009 ===
Date	Race	Competition	Rider	Country	Location
January 18	Down Under Classic	National Event	Robbie McEwen (AUS)	Australia	Adelaide
February 8	Trofeo Mallorca	UCI Europe Tour	Gert Steegmans (BEL)	Spain	Palma
February 9	Trofeo Cala Millor-Cala Bona	UCI Europe Tour	Robbie McEwen (AUS)	Spain	Cala Millor
February 11	Trofeo Pollença	UCI Europe Tour	Antonio Colom (ESP)	Spain	Bunyola
February 12	Vuelta a Mallorca, Overall	UCI Europe Tour	Antonio Colom (ESP)	Spain	
February 16	Vuelta a Andalucía, Stage 1	UCI Europe Tour	Danilo Napolitano (ITA)	Spain	Humilladero
February 17	Vuelta a Andalucía, Stage 2	UCI Europe Tour	Gert Steegmans (BEL)	Spain	Córdoba
February 20	Volta ao Algarve, Stage 3	UCI Europe Tour	Antonio Colom (ESP)	Portugal	Malhão
March 7	Driedaagse van West-Vlaanderen, Stage 2	UCI Europe Tour	Danilo Napolitano (ITA)	Belgium	Handzame
March 15	Paris–Nice, Stage 8	UCI World Ranking	Antonio Colom (ESP)	France	Nice
March 24	Settimana Internazionale di Coppi e Bartali, Stage 1	UCI Europe Tour	Danilo Napolitano (ITA)	Italy	Riccione
March 28	E3 Prijs Vlaanderen	UCI Europe Tour	Filippo Pozzato (ITA)	Belgium	Harelbeke
March 31	Three Days of De Panne, Stage 1	UCI Europe Tour	Filippo Pozzato (ITA)	Belgium	Zottegem
April 19	Amstel Gold Race	UCI World Ranking	Sergei Ivanov (RUS)	Netherlands	Valkenburg
May 17	Tour de Picardie, Stage 3	UCI Europe Tour	Robbie McEwen (AUS)	France	Noyon
May 22	Volta a Catalunya, Stage 5	UCI World Ranking	Nikolay Trusov (RUS)	Spain	Torredembarra
May 27	Tour of Belgium, Stage 1	UCI Europe Tour	Sergei Ivanov (RUS)	Belgium	Tervuren
June 4	Tour de Luxembourg, Stage 1	UCI Europe Tour	Danilo Napolitano (ITA)	Luxembourg	Mondorf
July 18	Tour de France, Stage 14	UCI World Ranking	Sergei Ivanov (RUS)	France	Besançon
August 29	Giro del Veneto	UCI Europe Tour	Filippo Pozzato (ITA)	Italy	Veneto
September 18	Tour of Britain, Stage 7	UCI Europe Tour	Ben Swift (GBR)	United Kingdom	Yeovil
September 20	Duo Normand	UCI Europe Tour	(Note: The riders who participated in this two-man team time-trial were Nikolay Trusov and Artem Ovechkin)	France	Normandy
October 3	Memorial Cimurri	UCI Europe Tour	Filippo Pozzato (ITA)	Italy	Emilia-Romagna
October 4	Tour de Vendée	UCI Europe Tour	Pavel Brutt (RUS)	France	La Roche-sur-Yon

=== 2010 ===
Date	Race	Competition	Rider	Country	Location
February 7	Trofeo Mallorca	UCI Europe Tour	Robbie McEwen (AUS)	Spain	Palma
March 28	Volta a Catalunya, Overall	UCI World Ranking	Joaquim Rodríguez (ESP)	Spain	
March 28	Volta a Catalunya, Teams classification	UCI World Ranking		Spain	
April 3	GP Miguel Induráin	UCI Europe Tour	Joaquim Rodríguez (ESP)	Spain	Estella-Lizarra
April 9	Tour of the Basque Country, Stage 5	UCI World Ranking	Joaquim Rodríguez (ESP)	Spain	Oriop
May 6	Four Days of Dunkirk, Stage 2	UCI Europe Tour	Danilo Napolitano (ITA)	France	Auby
May 19	Giro d'Italia, Stage 11	UCI World Ranking	Evgeni Petrov (RUS)	Italy	L'Aquila
May 20	Giro d'Italia, Stage 12	UCI World Ranking	Filippo Pozzato (ITA)	Italy	Porto Recanati
June 6	Tour de Luxembourg, Points classification	UCI Europe Tour	Serguei Ivanov (RUS)	Luxembourg	
July 11	Tour of Austria, Youth classification	UCI Europe Tour	Artem Ovechkin (RUS)	Austria	
July 16	Tour de France, Stage 12	UCI World Ranking	Joaquim Rodríguez (ESP)	France	Mende
July 24	Tour de Wallonie, Stage 1	UCI Europe Tour	Danilo Napolitano (ITA)	Belgium	Lessines
August 6	Vuelta a Burgos, Stage 3	UCI Europe Tour	Team Time Trial	Spain	Melgar de Fernamental
August 18	Eneco Tour, Stage 1	UCI World Ranking	Robbie McEwen (AUS)	Netherlands	Rhenen
August 19	Tour du Limousin, Stage 3	UCI Europe Tour	Alexandre Botcharov (RUS)	France	Mansac
September 11	Vuelta a España, Stage 14	UCI World Ranking	Joaquim Rodríguez (ESP)	Spain	Peña Cabarga
September 19	Vuelta a España, Teams classification	UCI World Ranking		Spain	
September 19	Duo Normand	UCI Europe Tour	(Note: The riders who participated in this two-man team time-trial were Alexandre Pliușchin and Artem Ovechkin)	France	Normandy
October 18	UCI World Ranking	UCI World Ranking	Joaquim Rodríguez (ESP)		

=== 2011 ===
Date	Race	Competition	Rider	Country	Location
February 26	Giro di Sardegna, Sprint classification	UCI Europe Tour	Arkimedes Arguelyes (RUS)	Italy	
February 27	Classica Sarda	UCI Europe Tour	Pavel Brutt (RUS)	Italy	Chiaramonti
March 30	Three Days of De Panne, Stage 2	UCI Europe Tour	Denis Galimzyanov (RUS)	Belgium	Koksijde
March 31	Three Days of De Panne, Points classification	UCI Europe Tour	Denis Galimzyanov (RUS)	Belgium	
April 4	Tour of the Basque Country, Stage 1	UCI World Tour	Joaquim Rodríguez (ESP)	Spain	Zumarraga
April 27	Tour de Romandie, Stage 2	UCI World Tour	Pavel Brutt (RUS)	Switzerland	Leysin
June 2	Tour de Luxembourg, Stage 1	UCI Europe Tour	Denis Galimzyanov (RUS)	Luxembourg	Bascharage
June 11	Critérium du Dauphiné, Stage 6	UCI World Tour	Joaquim Rodríguez (ESP)	France	Le Collet d'Allevard
June 12	Critérium du Dauphiné, Stage 7	UCI World Tour	Joaquim Rodríguez (ESP)	France	La Toussuire
June 12	Critérium du Dauphiné, Mountains classification	UCI World Tour	Joaquim Rodríguez (ESP)	France	
June 12	Critérium du Dauphiné, Points classification	UCI World Tour	Joaquim Rodríguez (ESP)	France	
August 4	Vuelta a Burgos, Stage 2	UCI Europe Tour	Joaquim Rodríguez (ESP)	Spain	Burgos
August 6	Vuelta a Burgos, Stage 4	UCI Europe Tour	Daniel Moreno (ESP)	Spain	Ciudad Romana de Clunia
August 7	Vuelta a Burgos, Overall	UCI Europe Tour	Joaquim Rodríguez (ESP)	Spain	
August 7	Vuelta a Burgos, Points classification	UCI Europe Tour	Joaquim Rodríguez (ESP)	Spain	
August 23	Vuelta a España, Stage 4	UCI World Tour	Daniel Moreno (ESP)	Spain	Sierra Nevada
August 24	Vuelta a España, Stage 5	UCI World Tour	Joaquim Rodríguez (ESP)	Spain	Valdepeñas de Jaén
August 27	Vuelta a España, Stage 8	UCI World Tour	Joaquim Rodríguez (ESP)	Spain	San Lorenzo de El Escorial
September 10	Paris–Brussels	UCI Europe Tour	Denis Galimzyanov (RUS)	(Note: Race held in France and Belgium.)	Brussels
October 9	Tour of Beijing, Stage 5	UCI World Tour	Denis Galimzyanov (RUS)	China	Beijing
October 9	Tour of Beijing, Points classification	UCI World Tour	Denis Galimzyanov (RUS)	China	
October 9	Gran Premio Bruno Beghelli	UCI Europe Tour	Filippo Pozzato (ITA)	Italy	Monteveglio
October 13	Giro del Piemonte	UCI Europe Tour	Daniel Moreno (ESP)	Italy	Novi Ligure

=== 2012 ===
Date	Race	Competition	Rider	Country	Location
20 January	Tour Down Under, Stage 4	UCI World Tour	Óscar Freire (ESP)	Australia	Tanunda
22 February	Vuelta a Andalucía, Stage 3	UCI Europe Tour	Óscar Freire (ESP)	Spain	Las Gabias
23 February	Vuelta a Andalucía, Stage 4	UCI Europe Tour	Daniel Moreno (ESP)	Spain	La Guardia de Jaén
12 March	Tirreno–Adriatico, Stage 6	UCI World Tour	Joaquim Rodríguez (ESP)	Italy	Offida
29 March	Three Days of De Panne, Stage 3a	UCI Europe Tour	Alexander Kristoff (NOR)	Belgium	De Panne
29 March	Three Days of De Panne, Points classification	UCI Europe Tour	Alexander Kristoff (NOR)	Belgium	
31 March	Volta Limburg Classic	UCI Europe Tour	Pavel Brutt (RUS)	Netherlands	Eijsden
31 March	GP Miguel Induráin	UCI Europe Tour	Daniel Moreno (ESP)	Spain	Estella
3 April	Circuit de la Sarthe, Stage 1	UCI Europe Tour	Denis Galimzyanov (RUS)	France	Riaillé
5 April	Tour of the Basque Country, Stage 4	UCI World Tour	Joaquim Rodríguez (ESP)	Spain	Bera
6 April	Tour of the Basque Country, Stage 5	UCI World Tour	Joaquim Rodríguez (ESP)	Spain	Oñati
7 April	Tour of the Basque Country, Teams classification	UCI World Tour	(Note: The riders on the squad were Joaquim Rodríguez, Daniel Moreno, Simon Špilak, Giampaolo Caruso, Eduard Vorganov, Yuri Trofimov, Ángel Vicioso and Alberto Losada)	Spain	
18 April	La Flèche Wallonne	UCI World Tour	Joaquim Rodríguez (ESP)	Belgium	Huy
29 April	Presidential Cycling Tour of Turkey, Sprints classification	UCI Europe Tour	Maxim Belkov (RUS)	Turkey	
29 April	Tour de Romandie, Mountains classification	UCI World Tour	Petr Ignatenko (RUS)	Switzerland	
29 April	Tour de Romandie, Sprints classification	UCI World Tour	Petr Ignatenko (RUS)	Switzerland	
15 May	Giro d'Italia, Stage 10	UCI World Tour	Joaquim Rodríguez (ESP)	Italy	Assisi
19 May	Heistse Pijl	National event	Maxime Vantomme (BEL)	Belgium	Heist-op-den-Berg
23 May	Giro d'Italia, Stage 17	UCI World Tour	Joaquim Rodríguez (ESP)	Italy	Cortina d'Ampezzo
27 May	Giro d'Italia, Points classification	UCI World Tour	Joaquim Rodríguez (ESP)	Italy	
5 June	Critérium du Dauphiné, Stage 2	UCI World Tour	Daniel Moreno (ESP)	France	Saint-Félicien
10 June	Critérium du Dauphiné, Stage 7	UCI World Tour	Daniel Moreno (ESP)	France	Châtel
13 June	Tour de Suisse, Stage 5	UCI World Tour	Vladimir Isaichev (RUS)	Switzerland	Gansingen
1 August	Vuelta a Burgos, Stage 1	UCI Europe Tour	Daniel Moreno (ESP)	Spain	Ojo Guareña
2 August	Vuelta a Burgos, Stage 2	UCI Europe Tour	Daniel Moreno (ESP)	Spain	Burgos
5 August	Vuelta a Burgos, Overall	UCI Europe Tour	Daniel Moreno (ESP)	Spain	
5 August	Vuelta a Burgos, Points classification	UCI Europe Tour	Daniel Moreno (ESP)	Spain	
23 August	Vuelta a España, Stage 6	UCI World Tour	Joaquim Rodríguez (ESP)	Spain	Jaca
25 August	Danmark Rundt, Stage 4	UCI Europe Tour	Alexander Kristoff (NOR)	Denmark	Odense
26 August	Danmark Rundt, Points classification	UCI Europe Tour	Alexander Kristoff (NOR)	Denmark	
30 August	Vuelta a España, Stage 12	UCI World Tour	Joaquim Rodríguez (ESP)	Spain	Mirador de Ézaro
1 September	World Ports Classic, Young rider classification	UCI Europe Tour	Alexander Kristoff (NOR)	(Note: Race held in Belgium and the Netherlands.)	
1 September	Vuelta a España, Stage 14	UCI World Tour	Joaquim Rodríguez (ESP)	Spain	Puerto de Ancares
8 September	Vuelta a España, Stage 20	UCI World Tour	Denis Menchov (RUS)	Spain	Bola del Mundo
29 September	Giro di Lombardia	UCI World Tour	Joaquim Rodríguez (ESP)	Italy	Lecco
12 October	Tour of Beijing, Stage 4	UCI World Tour	Marco Haller (AUT)	China	Chang Ping
13 October	UCI World Tour	UCI World Tour	Joaquim Rodríguez (ESP)		

=== 2013 ===
Date	Race	Competition	Rider	Country	Location
14 February	Tour of Oman, Stage 4	UCI Asia Tour	Joaquim Rodríguez (ESP)	Oman	Jabal Al Akhdhar
23 February	Omloop Het Nieuwsblad	UCI Europe Tour	Luca Paolini (ITA)	Belgium	Ghent
27 February	Le Samyn	UCI Europe Tour	Alexey Tsatevich (RUS)	Belgium	Dour
10 March	Tirreno–Adriatico, Stage 5	UCI World Tour	Joaquim Rodríguez (ESP)	Italy	Chieti
10 March	Paris–Nice, Teams classification	UCI World Tour	(Note: The riders on the squad were Simon Špilak, Xavier Florencio, Alexander Kristoff, Alberto Losada, Denis Menchov, Gatis Smukulis, Yuri Trofimov and Eduard Vorganov)	France	
20 March	Settimana Internazionale di Coppi e Bartali, Stage 1b	UCI Europe Tour	Team time trial (Note: The riders on the squad were Maxim Belkov, Sergey Chernetskiy, Mikhail Ignatiev, Petr Ignatenko, Timofey Kritsky, Alexander Porsev, and Anton Vorobyev)	Italy	Gatteo Mare
28 March	Three Days of De Panne, Stage 3a	UCI Europe Tour	Alexander Kristoff (NOR)	Belgium	De Panne
28 March	Three Days of De Panne, Points classification	UCI Europe Tour	Alexander Kristoff (NOR)	Belgium	
28 March	Three Days of De Panne, Mountains classification	UCI Europe Tour	Marco Haller (AUT)	Belgium	
30 March	Volta Limburg Classic	UCI Europe Tour	Rüdiger Selig (GER)	Netherlands	Eijsden
30 March	GP Miguel Induráin	UCI Europe Tour	Simon Špilak (SLO)	Spain	Estella
17 April	La Flèche Wallonne	UCI World Tour	Daniel Moreno (ESP)	Belgium	Huy
27 April	Tour de Romandie, Stage 4	UCI World Tour	Simon Špilak (SLO)	Switzerland	Les Diablerets
28 April	Tour of Turkey, Sprints classification	UCI Europe Tour	Mikhail Ignatiev (RUS)	Turkey	
1 May	Eschborn–Frankfurt City Loop	UCI Europe Tour	Simon Špilak (SLO)	Germany	Frankfurt
6 May	Giro d'Italia, Stage 3	UCI World Tour	Luca Paolini (ITA)	Italy	Marina di Ascea
12 May	Giro d'Italia, Stage 9	UCI World Tour	Maxim Belkov (RUS)	Italy	Firenze
15 May	Glava Tour of Norway, Stage 1	UCI Europe Tour	Alexander Kristoff (NOR)	Norway	Sarpsborg
16 May	Glava Tour of Norway, Stage 2	UCI Europe Tour	Alexander Kristoff (NOR)	Norway	Skien
19 May	Glava Tour of Norway, Stage 5	UCI Europe Tour	Alexander Kristoff (NOR)	Norway	Hønefoss
26 May	Tour of Belgium, Mountains classification	UCI Europe Tour	Mikhail Ignatiev (RUS)	Belgium	
12 June	Tour de Suisse, Stage 5	UCI World Tour	Alexander Kristoff (NOR)	Switzerland	Leuggern
13 June	Tour de Luxembourg, Stage 1	UCI Europe Tour	Alexander Porsev (RUS)	Luxembourg	Hautcharage
7 July	Tour of Austria, Young rider classification	UCI Europe Tour	Sergey Chernetskiy (RUS)	Austria	
20 July	Tour de Wallonie, Stage 1	UCI Europe Tour	Alexandr Kolobnev (RUS)	Belgium	Eupen
16 August	Tour des Fjords, Stage 1	UCI Europe Tour	Sergey Chernetskiy (RUS)	Norway	Stavanger
17 August	Tour des Fjords, Stage 2	UCI Europe Tour	Alexander Kristoff (NOR)	Norway	Forsand
17 August	Tour des Fjords, Stage 3	UCI Europe Tour	Team time trial (Note: The riders on the squad were Maxim Belkov, Sergey Chernetskiy, Marco Haller, Alexander Kristoff, Timofey Kritsky, Sergey Nikolaev, Maksim Razumov, and Rüdiger Selig)	Norway	Stavanger
18 August	Tour des Fjords, Overall	UCI Europe Tour	Sergey Chernetskiy (RUS)	Norway	
18 August	Tour des Fjords, Points classification	UCI Europe Tour	Alexander Kristoff (NOR)	Norway	
18 August	Tour des Fjords, Young rider classification	UCI Europe Tour	Sergey Chernetskiy (RUS)	Norway	
18 August	Tour des Fjords, Teams classification	UCI Europe Tour		Norway	
27 August	Vuelta a España, Stage 4	UCI World Tour	Daniel Moreno (ESP)	Spain	Fisterra–Etapa Fin del Mundo
30 August	Tour du Poitou-Charentes, Teams classification	UCI Europe Tour	(Note: The riders on the squad were Maxim Belkov, Pavel Brutt, Mikhail Ignatiev, Petr Ignatenko, Timofey Kritsky, Simon Špilak, Yuri Trofimov and Eduard Vorganov)	France	
1 September	Vuelta a España, Stage 9	UCI World Tour	Daniel Moreno (ESP)	Spain	Valdepeñas de Jaén
7 September	Settimana Ciclistica Lombarda, Stage 3	UCI Europe Tour	Alexey Tsatevich (RUS)	Italy	Bergamo
13 September	Vuelta a España, Stage 19	UCI World Tour	Joaquim Rodríguez (ESP)	Spain	Oviedo–Alto Naranco
6 October	Giro di Lombardia	UCI World Tour	Joaquim Rodríguez (ESP)	Italy	Lecco
15 October	UCI World Tour, Overall classification	UCI World Tour	Joaquim Rodríguez (ESP)		

=== 2014 ===
Date	Race	Competition	Rider	Country	Location
19 February	Tour of Oman, Stage 2	UCI Asia Tour	Alexander Kristoff (NOR)	Oman	Quriyat
23 March	Milan–San Remo	UCI World Tour	Alexander Kristoff (NOR)	Italy	Sanremo
26 March	Volta a Catalunya, Stage 3	UCI World Tour	Joaquim Rodríguez (ESP)	Spain	La Molina
30 March	Volta a Catalunya, Overall	UCI World Tour	Joaquim Rodríguez (ESP)	Spain	
1 May	Eschborn–Frankfurt – Rund um den Finanzplatz	UCI Europe Tour	Alexander Kristoff (NOR)	Germany	Frankfurt
2 May	Tour de Romandie, Stage 3	UCI World Tour	Simon Špilak (SLO)	Switzerland	Aigle
21 May	Tour of Norway, Stage 1	UCI Europe Tour	Alexander Kristoff (NOR)	Norway	Larvik
25 May	Tour of Norway, Stage 5	UCI Europe Tour	Alexander Kristoff (NOR)	Norway	Hønefoss
25 May	Tour of Norway, Points classification	UCI Europe Tour	Alexander Kristoff (NOR)	Norway	
29 May	Tour des Fjords, Stage 2	UCI Europe Tour	Alexander Kristoff (NOR)	Norway	Haugesund
31 May	Tour des Fjords, Stage 4	UCI Europe Tour	Alexander Kristoff (NOR)	Norway	Stavanger
1 June	Tour des Fjords, Stage 5	UCI Europe Tour	Alexander Kristoff (NOR)	Norway	Stavanger
1 June	Tour des Fjords, Overall	UCI Europe Tour	Alexander Kristoff (NOR)	Norway	
1 June	Tour des Fjords, Points classification	UCI Europe Tour	Alexander Kristoff (NOR)	Norway	
11 June	Critérium du Dauphiné, Stage 4	UCI World Tour	Yuri Trofimov (RUS)	France	Gap
12 June	Critérium du Dauphiné, Stage 5	UCI World Tour	Simon Špilak (SLO)	France	La Mure
13 July	Tour of Austria, Stage 8	UCI Europe Tour	Marco Haller (AUT)	Austria	Vienna
13 July	Tour of Austria, Mountains classification	UCI Europe Tour	Maxim Belkov (RUS)	Austria	
17 July	Tour de France, Stage 12	UCI World Tour	Alexander Kristoff (NOR)	France	Saint-Étienne
20 July	Tour de France, Stage 15	UCI World Tour	Alexander Kristoff (NOR)	France	Nîmes
15 August	Arctic Race of Norway, Stage 2	UCI Europe Tour	Alexander Kristoff (NOR)	Norway	Alta
16 August	Arctic Race of Norway, Stage 3	UCI Europe Tour	Simon Špilak (SLO)	Norway	Kvænangsfjellet
17 August	Vuelta a Burgos, Points classification	UCI Europe Tour	Daniel Moreno (ESP)	Spain	
17 August	Arctic Race of Norway, Stage 4	UCI Europe Tour	Alexander Kristoff (NOR)	Norway	Tromsø
17 August	Arctic Race of Norway, Points classification	UCI Europe Tour	Alexander Kristoff (NOR)	Norway	
24 August	Vattenfall Cyclassics	UCI World Tour	Alexander Kristoff (NOR)	Germany	Hamburg
14 September	Vuelta a España, Teams classification	UCI World Tour	(Note: The riders on the squad were Joaquim Rodríguez, Giampaolo Caruso, Sergey Chernetskiy, Alexandr Kolobnev, Dmitry Kozonchuk, Alberto Losada, Daniel Moreno, Yuri Trofimov and Eduard Vorganov)	Spain	
1 October	Milano–Torino	UCI Europe Tour	Giampaolo Caruso (ITA)	Italy	Turin

=== 2015 ===
Date	Race	Competition	Rider	Country	Location
9 February	Tour of Qatar, Stage 2	UCI Asia Tour	Alexander Kristoff (NOR)	Qatar	Al Khor Corniche
11 February	Tour of Qatar, Stage 4	UCI Asia Tour	Alexander Kristoff (NOR)	Qatar	Mesaieed
12 February	Tour of Qatar, Stage 5	UCI Asia Tour	Alexander Kristoff (NOR)	Qatar	Madinat ash Shamal
13 February	Tour of Qatar, Points classification	UCI Asia Tour	Alexander Kristoff (NOR)	Qatar	
19 February	Tour of Oman, Stage 3	UCI Asia Tour	Alexander Kristoff (NOR)	Oman	Al-Musannah Sports City
22 February	Volta ao Algarve, Portuguese rider classification	UCI Europe Tour	Tiago Machado (POR)	Portugal	
22 February	Volta ao Algarve, Teams classification	UCI Europe Tour	(Note: The riders on the squad were Sergey Chernetskiy, Yuri Trofimov, Rüdiger Selig, Alberto Losada, Tiago Machado, Alexander Porsev, Anton Vorobyev and Alexandr Kolobnev)	Portugal	
6 March	Driedaagse van West-Vlaanderen, Prologue	UCI Europe Tour	Anton Vorobyev (RUS)	Belgium	Middelkerke
9 March	Paris–Nice, Stage 1	UCI World Tour	Alexander Kristoff (NOR)	France	Contres
28 March	Volta a Catalunya, Stage 6	UCI World Tour	Sergey Chernetskiy (RUS)	Spain	PortAventura
29 March	Gent–Wevelgem	UCI World Tour	Luca Paolini (ITA)	Belgium	Wevelgem
31 March	Three Days of De Panne, Stage 1	UCI Europe Tour	Alexander Kristoff (NOR)	Belgium	Zottegem
1 April	Three Days of De Panne, Stage 2	UCI Europe Tour	Alexander Kristoff (NOR)	Belgium	Koksijde
2 April	Three Days of De Panne, Stage 3a	UCI Europe Tour	Alexander Kristoff (NOR)	Belgium	De Panne
2 April	Three Days of De Panne, Overall	UCI Europe Tour	Alexander Kristoff (NOR)	Belgium	
2 April	Three Days of De Panne, Points classification	UCI Europe Tour	Alexander Kristoff (NOR)	Belgium	
4 April	GP Miguel Induráin	UCI Europe Tour	Ángel Vicioso (ESP)	Spain	Estella
5 April	Tour of Flanders	UCI World Tour	Alexander Kristoff (NOR)	Belgium	Oudenaarde
8 April	Scheldeprijs	UCI Europe Tour	Alexander Kristoff (NOR)	Belgium	Schoten
8 April	Tour of the Basque Country, Stage 3	UCI World Tour	Joaquim Rodríguez (ESP)	Spain	Zumarraga
9 April	Tour of the Basque Country, Stage 4	UCI World Tour	Joaquim Rodríguez (ESP)	Spain	Arrate
10 April	Circuit de la Sarthe, Young rider classification	UCI Europe Tour	Sven Erik Bystrøm (NOR)	France	
11 April	Tour of the Basque Country, Overall	UCI World Tour	Joaquim Rodríguez (ESP)	Spain	
11 April	Tour of the Basque Country, Points classification	UCI World Tour	Joaquim Rodríguez (ESP)	Spain	
11 April	Tour of the Basque Country, Teams classification	UCI World Tour	(Note: The riders on the squad were Joaquim Rodríguez, Simon Špilak, Daniel Moreno, Alexandr Kolobnev, Maxim Belkov, Sergey Lagutin, Ángel Vicioso and Ilnur Zakarin)	Spain	
3 May	Tour de Romandie, Overall	UCI World Tour	Ilnur Zakarin (RUS)	Switzerland	
3 May	Tour de Romandie, Mountains classification	UCI World Tour	Maxim Belkov (RUS)	Switzerland	
3 May	Tour de Romandie, Sprints classification	UCI World Tour	Maxim Belkov (RUS)	Switzerland	
3 May	Tour de Romandie, Teams classification	UCI World Tour	(Note: The riders on the squad were Simon Špilak, Maxim Belkov, Sergey Chernetskiy, Pavel Kochetkov, Egor Silin, Yuri Trofimov, Anton Vorobyev and Ilnur Zakarin)	Switzerland	
20 May	Giro d'Italia, Stage 11	UCI World Tour	Ilnur Zakarin (RUS)	Italy	Imola Circuit
20 May	Tour of Norway, Stage 1	UCI Europe Tour	Alexander Kristoff (NOR)	Norway	Sarpsborg
21 May	Tour of Norway, Stage 2	UCI Europe Tour	Alexander Kristoff (NOR)	Norway	Langesund
24 May	Tour of Norway, Points classification	UCI Europe Tour	Alexander Kristoff (NOR)	Norway	
27 May	Tour des Fjords, Stage 1	UCI Europe Tour	Alexander Kristoff (NOR)	Norway	Norheimsund
28 May	Tour des Fjords, Stage 2	UCI Europe Tour	Alexander Kristoff (NOR)	Norway	Haugesund
29 May	Tour des Fjords, Stage 3	UCI Europe Tour	Alexander Kristoff (NOR)	Norway	Sauda
31 May	Tour des Fjords, Overall	UCI Europe Tour	Marco Haller (AUT)	Norway	
31 May	Tour des Fjords, Points classification	UCI Europe Tour	Alexander Kristoff (NOR)	Norway	
31 May	Tour des Fjords, Young rider classification	UCI Europe Tour	Marco Haller (AUT)	Norway	
11 June	Grand Prix of Aargau Canton	UCI Europe Tour	Alexander Kristoff (NOR)	Switzerland	Gippingen
19 June	Tour de Suisse, Stage 7	UCI World Tour	Alexander Kristoff (NOR)	Switzerland	Düdingen
21 June	Tour de Suisse, Overall	UCI World Tour	Simon Špilak (SLO)	Switzerland	
4 July	Tour of Austria, Stage 1	UCI Europe Tour	Team time trial (Note: The riders on the squad were Sven Erik Bystrøm, Vladimir Isaichev, Daniel Moreno, Rüdiger Selig, Egor Silin, Gatis Smukulis, Ángel Vicioso and Eduard Vorganov)	Austria	Vienna
6 July	Tour de France, Stage 3	UCI World Tour	Joaquim Rodríguez (ESP)	Belgium	Mur de Huy
16 July	Tour de France, Stage 12	UCI World Tour	Joaquim Rodríguez (ESP)	France	Plateau de Beille
13 August	Arctic Race of Norway, Stage 1	UCI Europe Tour	Alexander Kristoff (NOR)	Norway	Harstad

=== 2016 ===
Date	Race	Competition	Rider	Country	Location
9 February	Tour of Qatar, Stage 2	UCI Asia Tour	Alexander Kristoff (NOR)	Qatar	Doha
11 February	Tour of Qatar, Stage 4	UCI Asia Tour	Alexander Kristoff (NOR)	Qatar	Madinat ash Shamal
12 February	Tour of Qatar, Stage 5	UCI Asia Tour	Alexander Kristoff (NOR)	Qatar	Doha Corniche
12 February	Tour of Qatar, Points classification	UCI Asia Tour	Alexander Kristoff (NOR)	Qatar	
18 February	Tour of Oman, Stage 3	UCI Asia Tour	Alexander Kristoff (NOR)	Oman	
21 February	Tour of Oman, Stage 6	UCI Asia Tour	Alexander Kristoff (NOR)	Oman	
21 February	Volta ao Algarve, Teams classification	UCI Europe Tour		Portugal	
12 March	Paris–Nice, Stage 6	UCI World Tour	Ilnur Zakarin (RUS)	France	La Madone d'Utelle
27 March	Volta a Catalunya, Stage 7	UCI World Tour	Alexey Tsatevich (RUS)	Spain	Barcelona
29 March	Three Days of De Panne, Stage 1	UCI Europe Tour	Alexander Kristoff (NOR)	Belgium	Zottegem
31 March	Three Days of De Panne, Points classification	UCI Europe Tour	Alexander Kristoff (NOR)	Belgium	
6 April	Circuit de la Sarthe, Stage 2b	UCI Europe Tour	Anton Vorobyev (RUS)	France	
7 April	Circuit de la Sarthe, Stage 3	UCI Europe Tour	Anton Vorobyev (RUS)	France	
28 May	Giro d'Italia, Stage 20	UCI World Tour	Rein Taaramäe (EST)	Italy	

=== 2017 ===
Date	Race	Competition	Rider	Country	Location
22 January	Tour Down Under, Youth classification	UCI World Tour	Jhonatan Restrepo (COL)	Australia	
2 February	Volta a la Comunitat Valenciana, Stage 2	UCI Europe Tour	Tony Martin (GER)	Spain	Dénia
2 February	Étoile de Bessèges, Stage 2	UCI Europe Tour	Alexander Kristoff (NOR)	France	Rodilhan
5 February	Étoile de Bessèges, Points classification	UCI Europe Tour	Alexander Kristoff (NOR)	France	
5 February	Étoile de Bessèges, Youth classification	UCI Europe Tour	Mads Würtz Schmidt (DEN)	France	
14 February	Tour of Oman, Stage 1	UCI Asia Tour	Alexander Kristoff (NOR)	Oman	Naseem Park
17 February	Tour of Oman, Stage 4	UCI Asia Tour	Alexander Kristoff (NOR)	Oman	Ministry of Tourism
19 February	Tour of Oman, Stage 6	UCI Asia Tour	Alexander Kristoff (NOR)	Oman	Matrah Corniche
19 February	Tour of Oman, Points classification	UCI Asia Tour	Alexander Kristoff (NOR)	Oman	
29 March	Three Days of De Panne, Stage 2	UCI Europe Tour	Alexander Kristoff (NOR)	Belgium	Koksijde
29 March	Three Days of De Panne, Points classification	UCI Europe Tour	Alexander Kristoff (NOR)	Belgium	
1 May	Eschborn–Frankfurt – Rund um den Finanzplatz	UCI World Tour	Alexander Kristoff (NOR)	Germany	Frankfurt
27 May	Tour of Belgium, Stage 4	UCI Europe Tour	Maurits Lammertink (NED)	Belgium	Ans
16 June	Tour de Suisse, Stage 7	UCI World Tour	Simon Špilak (SLO)	Austria	Sölden
17 June	Ster ZLM Toer, Stage 3	UCI Europe Tour	José Gonçalves (POR)	Belgium	La Gileppe–Jalhay
18 June	Ster ZLM Toer, Overall	UCI Europe Tour	José Gonçalves (POR)	Netherlands	
30 July	RideLondon–Surrey Classic	UCI World Tour	Alexander Kristoff (NOR)	United Kingdom	London
11 August	Arctic Race of Norway, Stage 2	UCI Europe Tour	Alexander Kristoff (NOR)	Norway	Bardufoss

== Classics ==
Race	Location	Winner
2009 Down Under Classic	Australia	(Australia) Robbie McEwen
2009 E3 Prijs Vlaanderen	Belgium	(Italy) Filippo Pozzato
2009 Amstel Gold Race	Netherlands	(Russia) Sergei Ivanov
2009 Giro del Veneto	Italy	(Italy) Filippo Pozzato
2009 Memorial Cimurri	Italy	(Italy) Filippo Pozzato
2009 Tour de Vendée	France	(Russia) Pavel Brutt
2010 GP Miguel Induráin	Spain	(Spain) Joaquim Rodríguez
2011 Classica Sarda	Italy	(Russia) Pavel Brutt
2011 Paris–Brussels	France/Belgium	(Russia) Denis Galimzyanov
2011 Giro del Piemonte	Italy	(Spain) Daniel Moreno
2012 GP Miguel Induráin	Spain	(Spain) Daniel Moreno
2012 La Flèche Wallonne	Belgium	(Spain) Joaquim Rodríguez
2012 Giro di Lombardia	Italy	(Spain) Joaquim Rodríguez
2013 Omloop Het Nieuwsblad	Belgium	(Italy) Luca Paolini
2013 La Flèche Wallonne	Belgium	(Spain) Daniel Moreno
2013 Giro di Lombardia	Italy	(Spain) Joaquim Rodríguez
2014 Milan – San Remo	Italy	(Norway) Alexander Kristoff
2015 Gent–Wevelgem	Belgium	(Italy) Luca Paolini
2015 Tour of Flanders	Belgium	(Norway) Alexander Kristoff

== Grand Tours ==
=== Stage wins ===
==== Stage wins in the Tour de France ====
Year	Stage	Rider
2009	Stage 14	Sergei Ivanov (RUS)
2010	Stage 12	Joaquim Rodríguez (ESP)
2014	Stage 12	Alexander Kristoff (NOR)
2014	Stage 15	Alexander Kristoff (NOR)
2015	Stage 3	Joaquim Rodríguez (ESP)
2015	Stage 12	Joaquim Rodríguez (ESP)

==== Stage wins in the Giro d'Italia ====
Year	Stage	Rider
2010	Stage 11	Evgeni Petrov (RUS)
2010	Stage 12	Filippo Pozzato (ITA)
2012	Stage 10	Joaquim Rodríguez (ESP)
2012	Stage 17	Joaquim Rodríguez (ESP)
2013	Stage 3	Luca Paolini (ITA)
2013	Stage 9	Maxim Belkov (RUS)
2015	Stage 11	Ilnur Zakarin (RUS)
2016	Stage 20	Rein Taaramäe (EST)

==== Stage wins in the Vuelta a España ====
Year	Stage	Rider
2010	Stage 14	Joaquim Rodríguez (ESP)
2011	Stage 4	Daniel Moreno (ESP)
2011	Stage 5	Joaquim Rodríguez (ESP)
2011	Stage 8	Joaquim Rodríguez (ESP)
2012	Stage 6	Joaquim Rodríguez (ESP)
2012	Stage 12	Joaquim Rodríguez (ESP)
2012	Stage 14	Joaquim Rodríguez (ESP)
2012	Stage 20	Denis Menchov (RUS)
2013	Stage 4	Daniel Moreno (ESP)
2013	Stage 9	Daniel Moreno (ESP)
2013	Stage 19	Joaquim Rodríguez (ESP)
2015	Stage 15	Joaquim Rodríguez (ESP)

=== Classifications ===
==== Team classification ====
Year	Event
2010	Vuelta a España
2014	Vuelta a España
