= 2010 Team Sky season =

Team Sky
- 2010 season
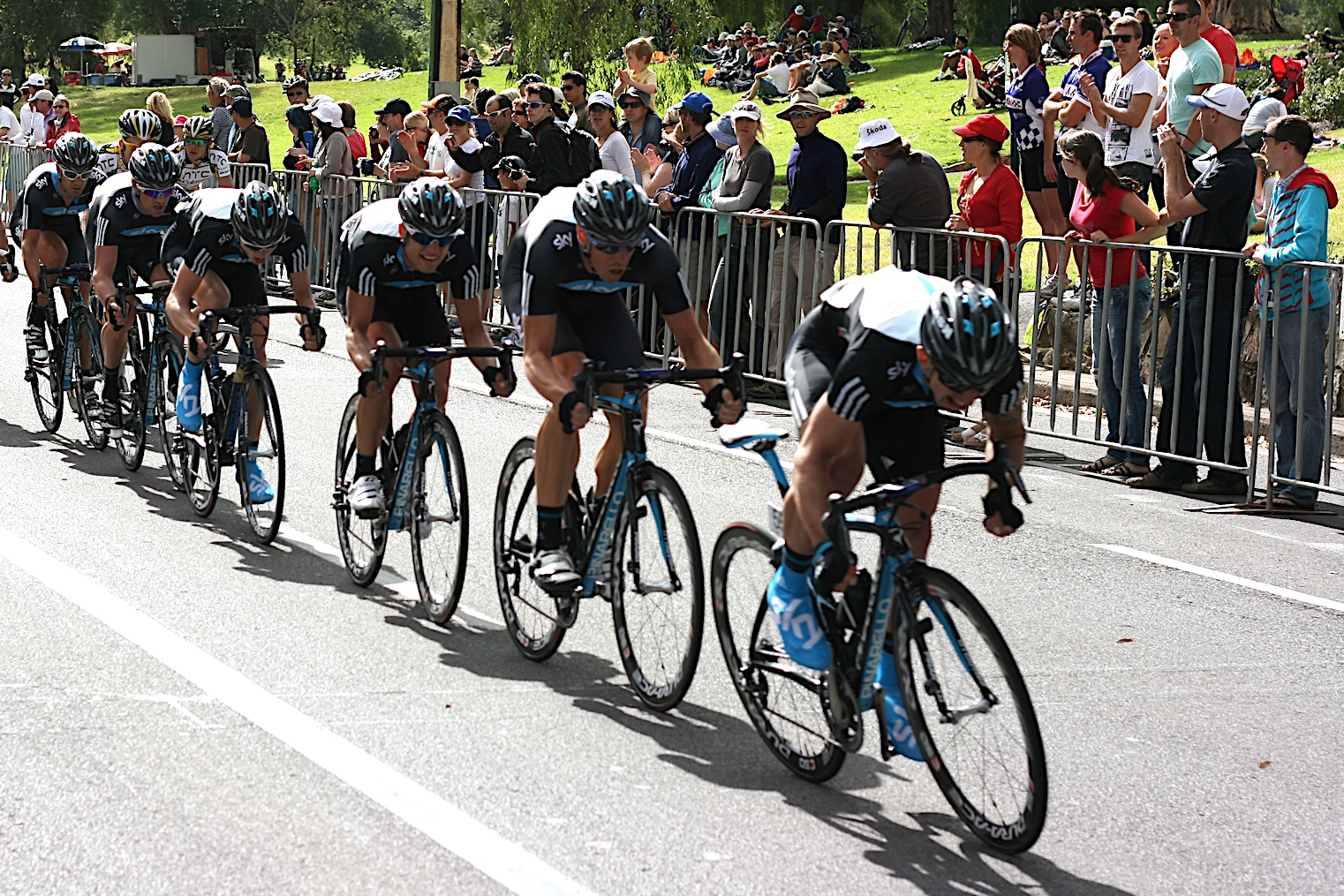
- The team at the 2010 Cancer Council Helpline Classic
- UCI code: SKY
- Status: UCI ProTeam
- World Ranking: 15th (435 points)
- Manager: Dave Brailsford
- Main sponsor(s): BSkyB
- Based: United Kingdom
- Bicycles: Pinarello
- Groupset: Shimano

Season victories
- One-day races: 3
- Stage race overall: 2
- Stage race stages: 15
- National Championships: 3
- Most wins: Greg Henderson (5 wins)
- Best ranked rider: Edvald Boasson Hagen (17th)

The 2010 season for Team Sky, its first, began in January with the Tour Down Under. As a UCI ProTour team, they were automatically invited and obliged to attend every event in the ProTour. The team formed for the 2010 season as part of an initiative by British Cycling to produce the first ever British Tour de France winner within five years. Much of the team's ridership is British, most of it is anglophone, and the team competes under a British licence. Its manager is Dave Brailsford, the former Performance Director of British Cycling. Senior Director Sportif was Australian ex-professional road cyclist Scott Sunderland. Team Sky's other Sports Directors were former professional cyclists Marcus Ljungqvist from Sweden, the Briton Sean Yates, and Steven de Jongh from the Netherlands.

== 2010 roster ==
Ages as of 1 January 2010.

Rider	Date of birth
Kurt Asle Arvesen (NOR)	9 February 1976 (aged 33)
John-Lee Augustyn (RSA)	10 August 1986 (aged 23)
Michael Barry (CAN)	18 December 1975 (aged 34)
Edvald Boasson Hagen (NOR)	17 May 1987 (aged 22)
Sylvain Calzati (FRA)	26 December 1979 (aged 30)
Kjell Carlström (FIN)	18 October 1976 (aged 33)
Dario Cioni (ITA)	2 December 1974 (aged 35)
Steve Cummings (GBR)	19 March 1981 (aged 28)
Russell Downing (GBR)	23 August 1978 (aged 31)
Juan Antonio Flecha (ESP)	17 September 1977 (aged 32)
Chris Froome (GBR)	20 May 1985 (aged 24)
Simon Gerrans (AUS)	16 May 1980 (aged 29)
Mathew Hayman (AUS)	20 April 1978 (aged 31)

Rider	Date of birth
Greg Henderson (NZL)	9 October 1976 (aged 33)
Peter Kennaugh (GBR)	15 June 1989 (aged 20)
Thomas Lövkvist (SWE)	4 April 1984 (aged 25)
Lars Petter Nordhaug (NOR)	14 May 1984 (aged 25)
Serge Pauwels (BEL)	21 November 1983 (aged 26)
Nicolas Portal (FRA)	23 April 1979 (aged 30)
Morris Possoni (ITA)	1 July 1984 (aged 25)
Ian Stannard (GBR)	25 May 1987 (aged 22)
Christopher Sutton (AUS)	10 September 1984 (aged 25)
Ben Swift (GBR)	5 November 1987 (aged 22)
Geraint Thomas (GBR)	25 May 1986 (aged 23)
Davide Viganò (ITA)	12 June 1984 (aged 25)
Bradley Wiggins (GBR)	28 April 1980 (aged 29)

Riders' 2009 teams

Rider	2009 team
Kurt Asle Arvesen	Team Saxo Bank
John-Lee Augustyn	Barloworld
Michael Barry	Team Columbia–HTC
Edvald Boasson Hagen	Team Columbia–HTC
Sylvain Calzati	Agritubel
Kjell Carlström	Liquigas–Doimo
Dario Cioni	ISD–NERI
Steve Cummings	Barloworld
Russell Downing	CandiTV-Marshalls Pasta
Juan Antonio Flecha	Rabobank
Chris Froome	Barloworld
Simon Gerrans	Cervélo TestTeam
Mathew Hayman	Rabobank

Rider	2009 team
Greg Henderson	Team Columbia–HTC
Peter Kennaugh	neo-pro
Thomas Lövkvist	Team Columbia–HTC
Lars Petter Nordhaug	Joker–Bianchi
Serge Pauwels	Cervélo TestTeam
Nicolas Portal	Caisse d'Epargne
Morris Possoni	Team Columbia–HTC
Ian Stannard	ISD–NERI
Christopher Sutton	Garmin–Slipstream
Ben Swift	Team Katusha
Geraint Thomas	Barloworld
Davide Viganò	Fuji–Servetto
Bradley Wiggins	Garmin–Slipstream

== One-day races ==
Before the spring season began, the team took a victory in its first-ever race. Henderson was the team's captain for the Cancer Council Helpline Classic, a 51 km (32 mi) criterium run two days before the Tour Down Under with the same peloton, but not counting toward its standings. Team Sky was largely responsible for bringing back a breakaway that included Lance Armstrong and Óscar Pereiro, with Downing and Sutton leading Henderson out to the sprint win. Sutton finished the race in second place just behind Henderson.

=== National championships ===
At the British National Road Race Championships Team Sky controlled the men's race ending with riders in the top three positions. Geraint Thomas won the race, Peter Kennaugh came second and Ian Stannard came third. In the British National Time Trial Championships again claimed the top three with Bradley Wiggins retaining his title. In Norway Edvald Boasson Hagen won his National Time Trial Championships for the fourth time.

== Stage races ==
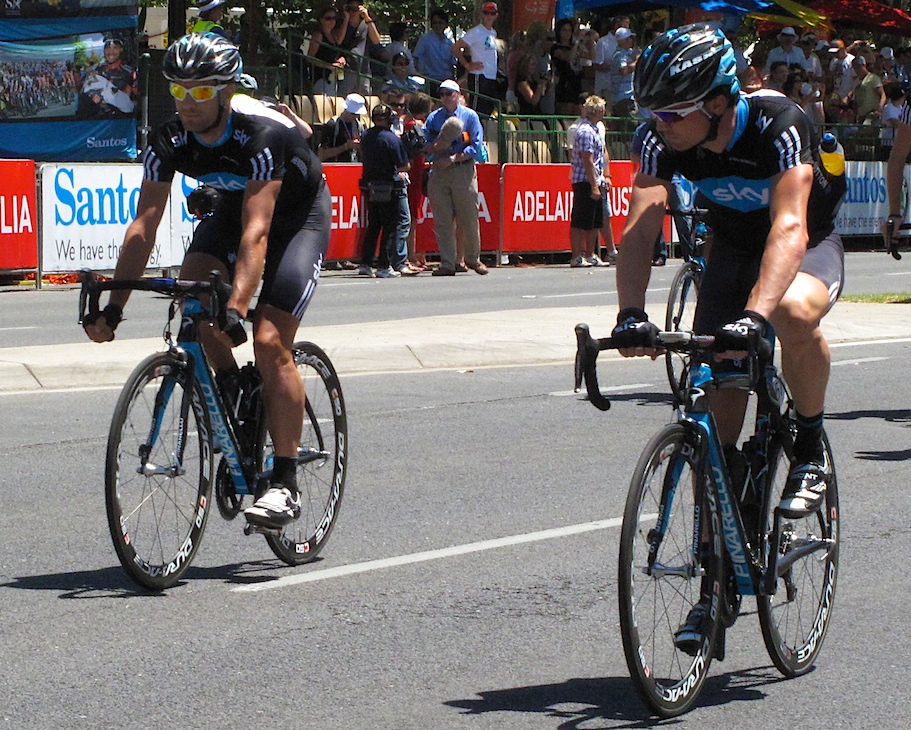
Greg Henderson and Chris Sutton warm up prior to the start of Stage 6 of the Tour Down Under

Henderson finished third overall in the Tour Down Under, after taking second place on stages 2 and 6 of the six-stage race. His teammate Sutton was the rider to beat him on the final stage. The team won the team time trial stage which opened the Tour of Qatar, giving Boasson Hagen the race lead. He lost it the next day, when attacks from Quick-Step and Cervélo TestTeam caught the team unaware and then, when the team had almost paced him back into the leading group, he suffered a puncture.

Later in February, at the inaugural Tour of Oman, Boasson Hagen again took race leadership, with third in a sprint to finish the race's second stage. He extended his lead with a victory in stage 3, but lost it the next day in a controversial stage 4. After Team Sky, who were pacing the peloton as the team of the race leader, let a morning breakaway get over seven minutes on a flat course, emotions ran high when no team seemed willing to help them bring the group back. Sky riders responded by pulling the peloton quickly through the stage's feed zone, something which is normally not done. Later, Cervélo TestTeam attacked 56 km (35 mi) from the end of the stage, while Boasson Hagen had stopped to urinate at the side of the road, also something which is normally not done. Boasson Hagen lost a minute and five seconds on the stage, and the race leader's red jersey. Boasson Hagen went on to win the stage 6 time trial to close the event, winning the points and youth classifications in the race and finishing second overall.

== Grand Tours ==
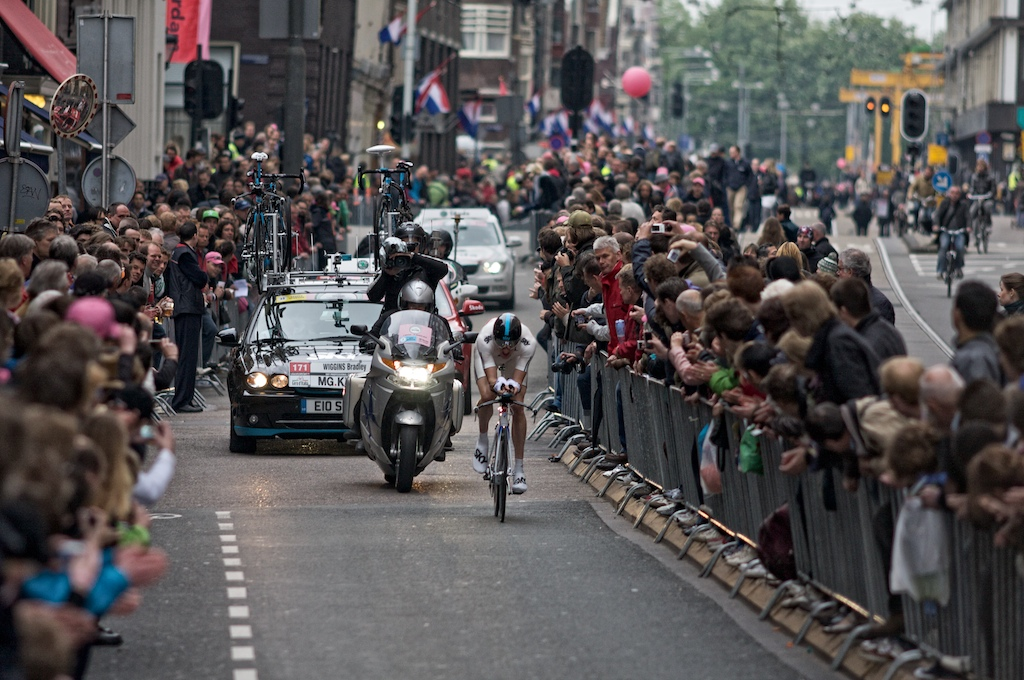
Bradley Wiggins riding to victory on Stage 1 of the 2010 Giro d'Italia

=== Giro d'Italia ===
The first Grand Tour for Team Sky started out nicely with Bradley Wiggins winning the first stage. This put him into the Maglia Rosa, he would only wear it for one stage.
Chris Froome was disqualified during stage 19 for holding onto a police motorbike. The team had a few near misses with stage wins; Coming second in the team time trial by only 13 seconds to Liquigas–Doimo and Greg Henderson's second-place finish in Stage 13.

=== Tour de France ===
The team were awarded a wild-card entry for the 2010 Tour de France. In stage 2 of the tour Geraint Thomas finished second on the stage putting him into the lead of the youth classification, he would retain this jersey until stage 7 where he lost 3 minutes on the overall leader.

=== Vuelta a España ===
Team Sky received an invite to participate in the 2010 Vuelta a España.

During the race, many of the team's riders and staff contracted an unknown virus. John Lee Augustyn, Juan Antonio Flecha, and Ben Swift were forced to retire from the race due to illness. Soigneur Txema Gonzalez died five days after being admitted to hospital due to an unrelated bacterial infection, with the team withdrawing from the race before the start of stage eight.

== Season victories ==
Date	Race	Competition	Rider	Country	Location
January 17	Cancer Council Helpline Classic	None	Greg Henderson (NZL)	Australia	Rymill Park, Adelaide
January 24	Tour Down Under, Stage 6	UCI ProTour	Chris Sutton (AUS)	Australia	Adelaide
February 7	Tour of Qatar, Stage 1	UCI Asia Tour	Team time trial (Note: The riders on the squad were Kurt Asle Arvesen, Edvald Boasson Hagen, Russell Downing, Juan Antonio Flecha, Lars Petter Nordhaug, Ian Stannard, Geraint Thomas and Bradley Wiggins)	Qatar	West Bay Lagoon
February 16	Tour of Oman, Stage 3	UCI Asia Tour	Edvald Boasson Hagen (NOR)	Oman	Qurayyat
February 19	Tour of Oman, Stage 6	UCI Asia Tour	Edvald Boasson Hagen (NOR)	Oman	Muscat
February 19	Tour of Oman, Points classification	UCI Asia Tour	Edvald Boasson Hagen (NOR)	Oman	
February 19	Tour of Oman, Young rider classification	UCI Asia Tour	Edvald Boasson Hagen (NOR)	Oman	
February 27	Omloop Het Nieuwsblad	UCI Europe Tour	Juan Antonio Flecha (ESP)	Belgium	Ghent
March 8	Paris–Nice, Stage 1	UCI World Ranking	Greg Henderson (NZL)	France	Contres
March 16	Tirreno–Adriatico, Stage 7	UCI World Ranking	Edvald Boasson Hagen (NOR)	Italy	San Benedetto del Tronto
March 28	Critérium International, Stage 2	UCI Europe Tour	Russell Downing (GBR)	France	Porto-Vecchio
May 8	Giro d'Italia, Stage 1	UCI World Ranking	Bradley Wiggins (GBR)	Netherlands	Amsterdam
May 15	Tour de Picardie, Stage 2	UCI Europe Tour	Ben Swift (GBR)	France	Cires-lès-Mello
May 16	Tour de Picardie, General classification	UCI Europe Tour	Ben Swift (GBR)	France	
May 16	Tour de Picardie, Points classification	UCI Europe Tour	Ben Swift (GBR)	France	
May 16	Tour de Picardie, Teams classification	UCI Europe Tour	(Note: The riders on the squad were Ben Swift, Russell Downing, Davide Viganò, Juan Antonio Flecha, Lars Petter Nordhaug, Peter Kennaugh, Nicolas Portal and Geraint Thomas)	France	
May 16	Tour de Picardie, Young rider classification	UCI Europe Tour	Ben Swift (GBR)	France	
June 13	Critérium du Dauphiné, Stage 7	UCI ProTour	Edvald Boasson Hagen (NOR)	France	Sallanches
June 18	Ster Elektrotoer, Stage 3	UCI Europe Tour	Greg Henderson (NZL)	Netherlands	Schimmert
June 24	Norwegian National Time Trial Championships	National Championship	Edvald Boasson Hagen (NOR)	Norway	Orkanger
June 27	British National Road Race Championships	National Championship	Geraint Thomas (GBR)	United Kingdom	Pendle
July 23	Brixia Tour, Stage 3	UCI Europe Tour	Chris Sutton (AUS)	Italy	Pisogne
July 28	Tour de Wallonie, Stage 5	UCI Europe Tour	Russell Downing (GBR)	Belgium	Welkenraedt
July 28	Tour de Wallonie, General classification	UCI Europe Tour	Russell Downing (GBR)	Belgium	
August 13	Dutch Food Valley Classic	UCI Europe Tour	Edvald Boasson Hagen (NOR)	Netherlands	Veenendaal
August 21	Eneco Tour, Stage 4	UCI ProTour	Greg Henderson (NZL)	Netherlands	Roermond
August 24	Eneco Tour, Points classification	UCI ProTour	Edvald Boasson Hagen (NOR)	Belgium/Netherlands	
September 5	British National Time Trial Championships	National Championship	Bradley Wiggins (GBR)	United Kingdom	Llandeilo
September 12	Tour of Britain, Stage 2	UCI Europe Tour	Greg Henderson (NZL)	United Kingdom	Stoke-on-Trent
September 18	Tour of Britain, Points classification	UCI Europe Tour	Greg Henderson (NZL)	Great Britain	
