= 2026 UCI Africa Tour =

22nd season of the UCI Africa Tour

- Twenty-second edition of the UCI Africa Tour

Details
- Dates: 22 February – 20 September
- Location: Africa
- Races: 12

The 2026 UCI Africa Tour is the 22nd season of the UCI Africa Tour. The season will begin on 22 February with the Tour du Rwanda and will end in 9 October 2026 with Classique La Capitale. There are returning races such as Tour de Maurice, and new races such as Classique de Mauritius. There are also races in 2025 not returning to the 2026 season, like Grand Prix Sonatrach.

The points leader, based on the cumulative results of previous races, wears the UCI Africa Tour cycling jersey.

Throughout the season, points are awarded to the top finishers of stages within stage races and the final general classification standings of each of the stages races and one-day events. The quality and complexity of a race also determine how many points were awarded to the top finishers: the higher the UCI rating of a race, the more points are awarded. The UCI ratings from highest to lowest are as follows:

- Multi-day events: 2.1 and 2.2
- One-day events: 1.1 and 1.2

== Events ==
Races in the 2026 UCI Africa Tour
Race	Rating	Date	Winner	Team	Ref
Tour du Rwanda	2.1	22 February – 1 March 2026	Moritz Kretschy (GER)	NSN Development Team	
(Algeria) Tour d'Algérie	2.2	17–26 April 2026	Dimas Nur Fadhil Rizqi (INA)	Jakarta Pro Cycling Team	
(Benin) Tour du Bénin	2.2	27 April – 2 May 2026	Kristiāns Belohvoščiks (LVA)	Bike Aid	
(Algeria) Grand Prix de la Ville d'Alger	1.2	28 April 2026	Yacine Hamza (ALG)	Madar Pro Cycling Team	
(Benin) Grand Prix de Cotonou	1.2	3 May 2026	Oscar Schempp (GER)	Bike Aid	
(Mauritius) Tour de Maurice	2.2	2–5 June 2026	Anatolii Budiak (UKR)	Madar Pro Cycling Team	
(Cameroon) Tour du Cameroun	2.2	3–14 June 2026	Rodrigue Nounawe (CMR)	SNH Vélo Club	
Classique of Mauritius	1.2	7 June 2026	Nur Aiman Mohd Zariff (MAS)	Terengganu Cycling Team	
(Cameroon) Grand Prix d'Ongola	1.2	1 September 2026	Yacine Hamza (ALG)	Algeria (national team)	
(Cameroon) Grand Prix Chantal Biya	2.2	2–6 September 2026	Hamza Amari (ALG)	Algeria (national team)	
(Morocco) Tour du Maroc	2.2	11–20 September 2026	Cancelled		
(Algeria) Classique Djamaa El Kbir	1.2S	3 October 2026	Timothy Dupont (BEL)	Tarteletto–Isorex	
(Algeria) Grand Prix El Djazaïr	2.2	6–8 October 2026	Iker Mintegi (ESP)	Euskaltel–Euskadi	
(Algeria) Classique La Capitale	1.2	9 October 2026	Jonah Killy (USA)	Tarteletto–Isorex	
