= Dealton Nur Arif Prayogo =

Indonesian cyclist

Personal information
- Full name: Dealton Nur Arif Prayogo
- Born: 27 November 1992 (age 33) Indonesia

Cycling career
- Sport: Cycling
- Current team: Kelapa Gading Bikers
- Disciplines: Road; Track
- Role: Rider

Amateur teams
- 2011: PSN Gillas Hi-Tech Mall Cycling Team Surabaya
- 2016: SAKB Cycling Team
- 2016–2017: BRCC Cycling Team
- 2018: United Bike Kencana
- 2018–2020: KGB Jakarta
- 2022: Kelapa Gading Bikers

Professional teams
- 2013: Polygon Sweet Nice
- 2023–: Kelapa Gading Bikers

Major wins
- One-day races and Classics National Time Trial Championships (2018)

Dealton Nur Arif Prayogo (born 27 November 1992) is an Indonesian cyclist, who currently rides for UCI Continental team Kelapa Gading Bikers. Prayogo won the Indonesian National time trial championships in 2018.

== Career ==
Prayogo rode his first UCI race in 2011 the Tour de East Java where he finished in 42nd while riding for amateur team PSN Gillas Hi-Tech Mall Cycling Team Surabaya. His first top 10 result occurred in 2012 where he came fourth in Stage 4 of the Tour de East Java in a mass sprint.

In 2013 he signed for Polygon Sweet Nice which was now a UCI Continental team. However, the team failed to get its paperwork in order for the 2014 season so Prayogo had to find another team.

It wasn't until 2018 that Prayogo made his UCI break-through. Starting the season at the Tour de Lombok he finished 18th Overall with consistent placings over the three stages. He then rode the Singapore National time trial championships finishing in second. Two weeks later he rode the Time trial championships for Indonesia where he won by a slim margin of 7 seconds. Later in the year at the Nation event Badung Cup-2, Prayogo finished second in the opening time trial and recorded two top 10 results in the following stages. Because of his win at the national championships Prayogo was selected to represent Indonesia at the 2018 UCI Road World Championships in the Elite Time trial. He finished the race over 17 minutes down in 57th.

At the 2019 National championships Prayogo unsuccessfully defended his title coming second by 53 seconds.

In 2022 at the 2021 Southeast Asian Games Prayogo rode in the Time trial completing the course in 50' 49" to finish seventh.

At the 2023 UCI Track Cycling Nations Cup event in Jakarta Prayogo raced the team pursuit but did not qualify for the second round after posting a time of 4' 10" which was the second slowest time. However, this time set the new National record beating the old one by five seconds.

== Major results ==
2018
1st Time trial, National Road Championships
2nd Time trial, Singapore National Road Championships
2019
2nd Time trial, National Road Championships
4th Time trial, Thai National Road Championships
2022
7th Time trial, Southeast Asian Games
