= 2026 UCI America Tour =

Bicycle racing competition

2025–26 UCI America Tour
- Twenty-second edition of the UCI America Tour

Details
- Dates: 18 October 2025 – 18 October 2026
- Location: North America and South America
- Races: 34

The 2026 UCI America Tour is the 22nd season of the UCI America Tour. The season began on 18 October 2025 with the cycling competitions at the 2025 Central American Games and will end in 18 October 2026 with Clásica Provincia de Chiriquí.

Throughout the season, points were awarded to the top finishers of stages within stage races and the final general classification standings of each of the stages races and one-day events. The quality and complexity of a race also determined how many points were awarded to the top finishers, the higher the UCI rating of a race, the more points were awarded.

The UCI ratings from highest to lowest were as follows:

- Multi-day events: 2.1 and 2.2
- One-day events: 1.1 and 1.2

== Events ==
Races in the 2026 UCI America Tour
Race	Rating	Date	Winner	Team	Ref
(Guatemala) 2025 Central American Games (ITT)	1.2	18 October 2025	Franklin Archibold (PAN)	Panama (national team)	
(Guatemala) 2025 Central American Games (RR)	1.2	19 October 2025	Sergio Chumil (GUA)	Guatemala (national team)	
Vuelta a Guatemala	2.2	24 October – 2 November 2025	Santiago Garzón (COL)	GW Erco SportFitness	
(Peru) 2025 Bolivarian Games (ITT)	1.2	27 November 2025	Walter Vargas (COL)	Colombia (national team)	
(Peru) 2025 Bolivarian Games (RR)	1.2	5 December 2025	Leangel Linarez (VEN)	Venezuela (national team)	
Vuelta Ciclista a Costa Rica	2.2	12–21 December 2025	Luis Daniel Oses (CRC)	7C Economy Lacoinex	
(Venezuela) Vuelta al Táchira en Bicicleta	2.2	9–18 January 2026	Jorge Abreu (VEN)	Fina Arroz CES Multimarcas Bancamiga	
Tour Colombia	2.1	3–8 February 2026	Cancelled		
Jamaica International Cycling Classic	2.2	27–29 March 2026	Cancelled		
(Costa Rica) 2026 Central American Championships (ITT)	1.2	9 April 2026	Franklin Archibold (PAN)	Panama (national team)	
(Costa Rica) 2026 Central American Championships (RR)	1.2	12 April 2026	Carlos Samudio (PAN)	Panama (national team)	
(United States) Tour of the Gila	2.2	29 April – 3 May 2026	Henrique Avancini (BRA)	Localiza Meoo / Swift Pro Cycling	
(Guatemala) Vuelta Bantrab	2.2	29 April – 3 May 2026	César David Guavita (COL)	Best PC Ecuador	
(Brazil) Volta Ciclística Internacional do Estado de Sao Paulo	2.2	4–8 May 2026	Wilmar Paredes (COL)	Team Medellín–EPM	
(Brazil) Desafio das Américas de Ciclismo	1.2	10 May 2026	Tomás Quiroz (CHI)	Plus Performance–ZEO Sport	
(United States) Gran Premio New York City	1.2	17 May 2026	Sebastian Brenes (CRC)	Canel's–Java	
(Canada) Tour de Beauce	2.2	10–14 June 2026	Wilmar Paredes (COL)	Team Medellín–EPM	
(Dominican Republic) 2026 Central American and Caribbean Games (ITT)	1.2	25 July 2026	Walter Vargas (COL)	Colombia (national team)	
(Brazil) Tour do Rio	2.2	29 July – 2 August 2026	Cancelled		
(Dominican Republic) 2026 Central American and Caribbean Games (RR)	1.2	2 August 2026	Nicolás David Gómez (COL)	Colombia (national team)	
Vuelta a Colombia	2.2	8–16 August 2026 (Note: The Vuelta a Colombia has been cancelled and the final classification awarded after only 5 stages completed, due to the impact of the earthquake on 10 August.)	Diego Camargo (COL)	Team Medellín–EPM	
(Panama) Gran Prix Panamá	1.2	23 August 2026	Nicolás David Gómez (COL)	GW Erco SportFitness	
(Panama) Gran Prix Chitre	1.2	27 August 2026	Wilmar Paredes (COL)	Team Medellín–EPM	
(Panama) Clásica Azuero	2.2	29–30 August 2026	Wilmar Paredes (COL)	Team Medellín–EPM	
(United States) Philadelphia Cycling Classic p/b AmeriGas	1.1	30 August 2026	Tim Torn Teutenberg (GER)	Lidl–Trek	
(Brazil) Volta Ciclística de Santa Catarina	2.2	2–6 September 2026	Javier Jamaica (COL)	Nu Colombia	
Vuelta al Ecuador	2.2	7–13 September 2026	Héctor Renán Álvarez (ECU)	Best PC Ecuador	
(Argentina) 2026 South American Games (ITT)	1.2	15 September 2026	Mateo Kalejman (ARG)	Argentina (national team)	
(Argentina) 2026 South American Games (RR)	1.2	18 September 2026	Guillermo Thomas Silva (URU)	Uruguay (national team)	
Vuelta Ciclista a Venezuela	2.2	4-11 October 2026 (Note: The Vuelta Ciclista a Venezuela has originally been scheduled for 12–19 July 2026 before being cancelled.)	Brandon Rojas (COL)	GW Erco SportFitness	
(Dominican Republic) Caribbean Elite Road Cycling Championships (ITT)	1.2	10 October 2026	Kaden Hopkins (BER)	Bermuda (national team)	
(Dominican Republic) Caribbean Elite Road Cycling Championships (RR)	1.2	11 October 2026	Christopher Morales (PUR)	Puerto Rico (national team)	
(Panama) Gran Prix Chiriquí	1.2	16 October 2026	Xabier Berasategi (ESP)	Euskaltel–Euskadi	
(Panama) Clásica Provincia de Chiriquí	2.2	17–18 October 2026	Gotzon Martín (ESP)	Euskaltel–Euskadi	
