= 2009–10 UCI Europe Tour =

Road bicycle race series

- Sixth edition of the UCI Europe Tour

Details
- Dates: 18 October 2009 – 17 October 2010
- Location: Europe
- Races: About 300+

Champions
- Individual champion: Giovanni Visconti (ITA) (ISD–NERI)
- Teams' champion: Vacansoleil
- Nations' champion: Italy

The 2009–10 UCI Europe Tour was the sixth season of the UCI Europe Tour. The season began on 18 October 2009 with the Chrono des Nations and ended on 17 October 2010 with the Chrono des Nations.

The points leader, based on the cumulative results of previous races, wears the UCI Europe Tour cycling jersey. Giovanni Visconti of Italy was the defending champion of the 2008–09 UCI Europe Tour and was crowned as the 2009–10 UCI Europe Tour.

Throughout the season, points are awarded to the top finishers of stages within stage races and the final general classification standings of each of the stages races and one-day events. The quality and complexity of a race also determines how many points are awarded to the top finishers, the higher the UCI rating of a race, the more points are awarded.

The UCI ratings from highest to lowest are as follows:

- Multi-day events: 2.HC, 2.1 and 2.2
- One-day events: 1.HC, 1.1 and 1.2

== Events ==
=== 2009 ===
Date	Race name	Location	UCI Rating	Winner	Team
18 October	Chrono des Nations	France	1.1	Alexander Vinokourov (KAZ)	Astana

=== 2010 ===
Date	Race name	Location	UCI Rating	Winner	Team
30 January–2 February	Giro della Provincia di Reggio Calabria	Italy	2.1	Matteo Montaguti (ITA)	De Rosa–Stac Plastic
31 January	Grand Prix Cycliste la Marseillaise	France	1.1	Jonathan Hivert (FRA)	Saur–Sojasun
3–7 February	Étoile de Bessèges	France	2.1	Samuel Dumoulin (FRA)	Cofidis
6 February	Gran Premio della Costa Etruschi	Italy	1.1	Alessandro Petacchi (ITA)	Lampre–Farnese Vini
7 February	Trofeo Mallorca	Spain	1.1	Robbie McEwen (AUS)	Team Katusha
8 February	Trofeo Cala Millor	Spain	1.1	Óscar Freire (ESP)	Rabobank
9 February	Trofeo Inca	Spain	1.1	Linus Gerdemann (GER)	Team Milram
10 February	Trofeo Deia	Spain	1.1	Rui Costa (POR)	Caisse d'Epargne
10–14 February	Tour Méditerranéen	France	2.1	Rinaldo Nocentini (ITA)	Ag2r–La Mondiale
11 February	Trofeo Magaluf-Palmanova	Spain	1.1	André Greipel (GER)	Team HTC–Columbia
17–21 February	Volta ao Algarve	Portugal	2.1	Alberto Contador (ESP)	Astana
20 February	Trofeo Laigueglia	Italy	1.1	Francesco Ginanni (ITA)	Androni Giocattoli
20–21 February	Tour du Haut Var	France	2.1	Christophe Le Mével (FRA)	Française des Jeux
21–25 February	Vuelta a Andalucía	Spain	2.1	Michael Rogers (AUS)	Team HTC–Columbia
23–27 February	Giro di Sardegna	Italy	2.1	Roman Kreuziger (CZE)	Liquigas–Doimo
27 February	Gran Premio dell'Insubria-Lugano	Switzerland	1.1	Samuel Dumoulin (FRA)	Cofidis
27 February	Beverbeek Classic	Belgium	1.2	Yannick Eijssen (BEL)	PWS Eijssen
27 February	Omloop Het Nieuwsblad	Belgium	1.HC	Juan Antonio Flecha (ESP)	Team Sky
28 February	Classica Sarda Olbia-Pantogia	Italy	1.1	Giovanni Visconti (ITA)	ISD–NERI
28 February	Clásica de Almería	Spain	1.1	Theo Bos (NED)	Cervélo TestTeam
28 February	Kuurne–Brussels–Kuurne	Belgium	1.1	Bobbie Traksel (NED)	Vacansoleil
28 February	Gran Premio di Lugano	Switzerland	1.1	Roberto Ferrari (ITA)	De Rosa–Stac Plastic
28 February	Les Boucles du Sud Ardèche	France	1.1	Christophe Riblon (FRA)	Ag2r–La Mondiale
3 March	Giro del Friuli	Italy	1.1	Roberto Ferrari (ITA)	De Rosa–Stac Plastic
3 March	Le Samyn	Belgium	1.1	Jens Keukeleire (BEL)	Cofidis
3–7 March	Vuelta a Murcia	Spain	2.1	František Raboň (CZE)	Team HTC–Columbia
5–7 March	Driedaagse van West-Vlaanderen	Belgium	2.1	Jens Keukeleire (BEL)	Cofidis
6 March	Strade Bianche	Italy	1.1	Maxim Iglinsky (KAZ)	Astana
6 March	De Vlaamse Pijl	Belgium	1.2	Clinton Avery (NZL)	PWS Eijssen
7 March	Trofeo Zsšdi	Italy	1.2	Marko Kump (SLO)	Adria Mobil
7 March	Grand Prix de la Ville de Lillers	France	1.2	Benoît Daeninck (FRA)	Roubaix–Lille Métropole
14 March	Paris–Troyes	France	1.2	Cédric Pineau (FRA)	Roubaix–Lille Métropole
14 March	Poreč Trophy	Croatia	1.2	Matej Gnezda (SLO)	Adria Mobil
14 March	Omloop van het Waasland	Belgium	1.2	Denis Flahaut (FRA)	ISD Continental Team
14 March	Trofeo Franco Balestra	Italy	1.2	Alexander Mironov (RUS)	Itera–Katusha
17 March	Nokere Koerse	Belgium	1.1	Jens Keukeleire (BEL)	Cofidis
18–21 March	Istrian Spring Trophy	Croatia	2.2	Robert Vrečer (SLO)	Perutnina Ptuj
20 March	Classic Loire Atlantique	France	1.2	Laurent Mangel (FRA)	Saur–Sojasun
21 March	Cholet-Pays de la Loire	France	1.1	Leonardo Duque (COL)	Cofidis
21 March	Ronde van het Groene Hart	Netherlands	1.1	Jens Mouris (NED)	Vacansoleil
21 March	Gran Premio San Giuseppe	Italy	1.2	Enrico Battaglin (ITA)	Zalf Désirée Fior
21 March	La Roue Tourangelle	France	1.2	Yann Guyot (FRA)	Sojasun AC Noval
22–28 March	Tour de Normandie	France	2.2	Ronan van Zandbeek (NED)	Van Vliet EBH Elshof
23–27 March	Settimana Internazionale di Coppi e Bartali	Italy	2.1	Ivan Santaromita (ITA)	Liquigas–Doimo
24 March	Dwars door Vlaanderen	Belgium	1.1	Matti Breschel (DEN)	Team Saxo Bank
26–28 March	Grand Prix du Portugal	Portugal	2.Ncup	Tom Dumoulin (NED)	Netherlands (national team)
27 March	E3 Prijs Vlaanderen – Harelbeke	Belgium	1.HC	Fabian Cancellara (SUI)	Team Saxo Bank
27–28 March	Critérium International	France	2.HC	Pierrick Fédrigo (FRA)	Bbox Bouygues Telecom
30 March–1 April	Three Days of De Panne	Belgium	2.HC	David Millar (GBR)	Garmin–Transitions
31 March–5 April	Settimana Ciclistica Lombarda	Italy	2.1	Michele Scarponi (ITA)	Androni Giocattoli
2 April	Route Adélie de Vitré	France	1.1	Cyril Gautier (FRA)	Bbox Bouygues Telecom
2–4 April	Le Triptyque des Monts et Châteaux	Belgium	2.2	Jetse Bol (NED)	Rabobank Continental Team
3 April	Hel van het Mergelland	Netherlands	1.1	Yann Huguet (FRA)	Skil–Shimano
3 April	GP Miguel Induráin	Spain	1.HC	Joaquim Rodríguez (ESP)	Team Katusha
4 April	GP de la Ville de Nogent-sur-Oise	France	1.2	Vytautas Kaupas (LTU)	Continental Team Differdange
4 April	Trofeo Piva	Italy	1.2U	Andrea Pasqualon (ITA)	Zalf Désirée Fior
5 April	Rund um Köln	Germany	1.1	Juan José Haedo (ARG)	Team Saxo Bank
5 April	Giro del Belvedere	Italy	1.2U	Siarhei Papok (BLR)	San Marco Concrete Imet Caneva
6 April	GP Palio del Recioto	Italy	1.2U	Blaz Furdi (SLO)	Slovenia (national team)
6–9 April	Circuit de la Sarthe	France	2.1	Luis León Sánchez (ESP)	Caisse d'Epargne
7 April	Scheldeprijs	Belgium	1.HC	Tyler Farrar (USA)	Garmin–Transitions
8 April	Grand Prix Pino Cerami	Belgium	1.1	Jure Kocjan (SLO)	Carmiooro NGC
8–11 April	Cinturón a Mallorca	Spain	2.2	Sergio Mantecón (ESP)	Hosteleria de Cañete-Nagares
9–11 April	Circuit des Ardennes	France	2.2	Mikhail Antonov (RUS)	Itera–Katusha
10 April	Trofeo Edil C	Italy	1.2	Massimo Graziato (ITA)	U.C. Trevigiani–Dynamon–Bottoli
10 April	Tour des Flandres Espoirs	Belgium	1.Ncup	Marko Kump (SLO)	Slovenia (national team)
10 April	Ronde van Drenthe	Netherlands	1.1	Alberto Ongarato (ITA)	Vacansoleil
11 April	Dwars door Drenthe	Netherlands	1.1	Enrico Rossi (ITA)	Ceramica Flaminia
11 April	Klasika Primavera	Spain	1.1	Samuel Sánchez (ESP)	Euskaltel–Euskadi
11–18 April	Presidential Cycling Tour of Turkey	Turkey	2.HC	Giovanni Visconti (ITA)	ISD–NERI
13 April	Paris–Camembert	France	1.1	Sébastien Minard (FRA)	Cofidis
14 April	Brabantse Pijl	Belgium	1.1	Sébastien Rosseler (BEL)	Team RadioShack
14 April	La Côte Picarde	France	1.Ncup	Vyatcheslav Kuznetsov (RUS)	Russia (national team)
14–18 April	Vuelta a Castilla y León	Spain	2.1	Alberto Contador (ESP)	Astana
14–18 April	Tour du Loir-et-Cher	France	2.2	Mikhail Antonov (RUS)	Itera–Katusha
15 April	Grand Prix de Denain	France	1.1	Denis Flahaut (FRA)	ISD Continental Team
17 April	Tour du Finistère	France	1.1	Florian Vachon (FRA)	Bretagne–Schuller
17 April	Liège–Bastogne–Liège Espoirs	Belgium	1.2U	Ramūnas Navardauskas (LTU)	Vélo-Club La Pomme Marseille
17 April	ZLM Tour	Netherlands	1.Ncup	Arman Kamyshev (KAZ)	Kazakhstan (national team)
18 April	Tro-Bro Léon	France	1.1	Jérémy Roy (FRA)	Française des Jeux
18 April	Zellik–Galmaarden	Belgium	1.2	Coen Vermeltfoort (NED)	Rabobank Continental Team
18 April	Grand Prix of Donetsk	Ukraine	1.2	Vitaliy Popkov (UKR)	ISD Continental Team
18 April	Rund um Düren	Germany	1.2	Sven Krauss (GER)	Halanke.de-Öschelbronn
20–23 April	Giro del Trentino	Italy	2.1	Alexander Vinokourov (KAZ)	Astana
21–25 April	GP of Adygeya	Russia	2.2	Vitaliy Popkov (UKR)	ISD Continental Team
23 April	Banja Luka-Belgrade I	Bosnia and Herzegovina	1.2	Jure Zrimsek (SLO)	Sava
24 April	GP Llodio	Spain	1.1	Ángel Vicioso (ESP)	Andalucía–Cajasur
24 April	Arno Wallaard Memorial	Netherlands	1.2	Stefan van Dijk (NED)	Verandas Willems
25 April	Vuelta a La Rioja	Spain	1.1	Ángel Vicioso (ESP)	Andalucía–Cajasur
25 April	Giro dell'Appennino	Italy	1.1	Robert Kišerlovski (CRO)	Liquigas–Doimo
25 April	Paris–Mantes-en-Yvelines	France	1.2	Yoann Bagot (FRA)	Vélo-Club La Pomme Marseille
25 April	East Midlands Cicle Classic	United Kingdom	1.2	Michael Berling (DEN)	Glud & Marstrand–LRØ Radgivning
25 April	Ronde van Noord-Holland	Netherlands	1.2	Robert Wagner (GER)	Skil–Shimano
25 April	Gran Premio della Liberazione	Italy	1.2U	Jan Tratnik (SLO)	Slovenia (national team)
25 April–1 May	Tour de Bretagne	France	2.2	Franck Bouyer (FRA)	Bbox Bouygues Telecom
26–27 April	Giro delle Regioni	Italy	2.Ncup	Enrico Battaglin (ITA)	Italy (national team)
27 April	Subida al Naranco	Spain	1.1	Santiago Pérez (ESP)	Centro Ciclismo de Loulé-Louletano
28 April–2 May	Vuelta a Asturias	Spain	2.1	Constantino Zaballa (ESP)	Centro Ciclismo de Loulé-Louletano
29–30 April	The Paths of King Nikola	Montenegro	2.2	Vladimir Koev (BUL)	Hemus 1896–Vivelo
1 May	Grand Prix Herning	Denmark	1.1	Alex Rasmussen (DEN)	Team Saxo Bank
1 May	GP Industria & Artigianato di Larciano	Italy	1.1	Daniele Ratto (ITA)	Carmiooro NGC
1 May	Rund um den Finanzplatz Eschborn–Frankfurt	Germany	1.HC	Fabian Wegmann (GER)	Team Milram
1 May	Rund um den Finanzplatz Eschborn–Frankfurt U23	Germany	1.2U	Tino Thömel (GER)	Ked-Bianchi Team Berlin
1 May	Memoriał Andrzeja Trochanowskiego	Poland	1.2	André Schulze (GER)	PSK Whirlpool–Author
1 May	Mayor Cup	Russia	1.2	Zsolt Dér (SRB)	Partizan Srbija
1 May	Ronde van Overijssel	Netherlands	1.2	Job Vissers (NED)	Skil–Shimano
1 May	Grote 1-MeiPrijs	Belgium	1.2	Jan Kuyckx (BEL)	Qin Cycling Team
2 May	Circuito del Porto	Italy	1.2	Marco Amicabile (ITA)	Team Delio Gallina–S. Inox
2 May	Memorial Oleg Dyachenko	Russia	1.2	Alexander Mironov (RUS)	Itera–Katusha
3 May	GP of Moscow	Russia	1.2	Esad Hasanović (SRB)	Partizan Srbija
5–9 May	Four Days of Dunkirk	France	2.HC	Martin Elmiger (SUI)	Ag2r–La Mondiale
6–10 May	Five Rings of Moscow	Russia	2.2	Sergey Firsanov (RUS)	Team Designa Køkken–Blue Water
7–9 May	Szlakiem Grodów Piastowskich	Poland	2.1	Marek Rutkiewicz (POL)	Mróz–Active Jet
8 May	Scandinavian Race Uppsala	Sweden	1.2	Philip Nielsen (DEN)	Team Concordia Forsikring–Himmerland
9 May	GP Industrie del Marmo	Italy	1.2	Tomas Alberio (ITA)	U.C. Trevigiani–Dynamon–Bottoli
9 May	Omloop der Kempen	Netherlands	1.2	Stefan van Dijk (NED)	Verandas Willems
12 May	Batavus Prorace	Netherlands	1.1	Markus Eichler (GER)	Team Milram
12–16 May	Flèche du Sud	Luxembourg	2.2	Lasse Bochman Larsen (DEN)	Glud & Marstrand–LRØ Radgivning
13–16 May	Rhône-Alpes Isère Tour	France	2.2	Jérôme Coppel (FRA)	Saur–Sojasun
14–16 May	Tour de Picardie	France	2.1	Ben Swift (GBR)	Team Sky
17–22 May	Olympia's Tour	Netherlands	2.2	Taylor Phinney (USA)	Trek–Livestrong
19–23 May	Circuit de Lorraine	France	2.1	Fabio Felline (ITA)	Footon–Servetto–Fuji
20–23 May	Ronde de l'Isard	France	2.2U	Yannick Eijssen (BEL)	PWS Eijssen
21–24 May	Tour de Berlin	Germany	2.2U	Marc Goos (NED)	Cycling Team Jo Piels
23 May	Neuseen Classics	Germany	1.1	Roger Kluge (GER)	Team Milram
23–30 May	FBD Ras	Ireland	2.2	Alexander Wetterhall (SWE)	Team Sprocket
26–30 May	Tour of Belgium	Belgium	2.HC	Stijn Devolder (BEL)	Quick-Step
26–30 May	Bayern Rundfahrt	Germany	2.HC	Maxime Monfort (BEL)	Team HTC–Columbia
28 May	Tallinn–Tartu GP	Estonia	1.1	Denis Flahaut (FRA)	ISD Continental Team
28–30 May	Tour de Gironde	France	2.2	Julien Belgy (FRA)	Vendée U
28–31 May	Tour of Trakya	Turkey	2.2	Stefan Hristov (BUL)	Brisaspor
29 May	GP Kranj	Slovenia	1.1	Matej Gnezda (SLO)	Adria Mobil
29 May	Tartu GP	Estonia	1.1	Tanel Kangert (EST)	Estonia (national team)
29 May	Grand Prix de Plumelec-Morbihan	France	1.1	Wesley Sulzberger (AUS)	Française des Jeux
29 May	GP Hydraulika Mikolasek	Slovakia	1.2	Alois Kaňkovský (CZE)	ASC Dukla Praha
30 May	Rogaland GP	Norway	1.2	Vitaliy Popkov (UKR)	ISD Continental Team
30 May	Boucles de l'Aulne	France	1.1	Jean-Luc Delpech (FRA)	Bretagne–Schuller
30 May	Trofeo Città di San Vendemiano	Italy	1.2U	Stefano Agostini (ITA)	Zalf Désirée Fior
30 May	Paris–Roubaix Espoirs	France	1.2U	Taylor Phinney (USA)	Trek–Livestrong
2 June	Trofeo Alcide Degasperi	Italy	1.2	Sonny Colbrelli (ITA)	Zalf Désirée Fior
2–6 June	Ringerike GP	Norway	2.2	Christer Rake (NOR)	Joker–Bianchi
2–6 June	Tour de Luxembourg	Luxembourg	2.HC	Matteo Carrara (ITA)	Vacansoleil
5–12 June	Tour of Romania	Romania	2.2	Vladimir Koev (BUL)	Hemus 1896–Vivelo
6 June	Memorial Van Coningsloo	Belgium	1.2	Dries Hollanders (BEL)	PWS Eijssen
6 June	Coppa della Pace	Italy	1.2	Fabio Piscopiello (ITA)	Vega Prefabbricati Montappone
6 June	Grand Prix of Aargau Canton	Switzerland	1.HC	Kristof Vandewalle (BEL)	Topsport Vlaanderen–Mercator
8–15 June	Circuito Montañés	Spain	2.2	Fabio Duarte (COL)	Café de Colombia–Colombia es Pasión
10–13 June	Volta ao Alentejo	Portugal	2.2	David Blanco (ESP)	Palmeiras–Resort–Prio
10–13 June	Ronde de l'Oise	France	2.2	Steven Tronet (FRA)	Roubaix Lille Metropole
11–13 June	Delta Tour Zeeland	Netherlands	2.1	Tyler Farrar (USA)	Garmin–Transitions
11–13 June	Carpathia Couriers Path	Poland	2.2U	Adrian Honkisz (POL)	Poland (national team)
11–13 June	Oberösterreichrundfahrt	Austria	2.2	Leopold König (CZE)	PSK Whirlpool–Author
11–20 June	Giro Bio	Italy	2.2	Carlos Betancur (COL)	Colombia (national team)
13 June	Val d'Ille U Classic 35	France	1.2	Jimmy Casper (FRA)	Saur–Sojasun
14–19 June	Tour de Serbie	Serbia	2.2	Luca Ascani (ITA)	CDC–Cavaliere
15–20 June	Thüringen Rundfahrt U23	Germany	2.2U	John Degenkolb (GER)	Thüringer Energie Team
16–20 June	Ster Elektrotoer	Netherlands	2.1	Adam Hansen (AUS)	Team HTC–Columbia
17–19 June	Tour of Małopolska	Poland	2.2	Jacek Morajko (POL)	Mróz–Active Jet
17–20 June	Tour of Slovenia	Slovenia	2.1	Vincenzo Nibali (ITA)	Liquigas–Doimo
17–20 June	Route du Sud	France	2.1	David Moncoutié (FRA)	Cofidis
17–20 June	Boucles de la Mayenne	France	2.2	Jérémie Galland (FRA)	Saur–Sojasun
17–20 June	Tour des Pays de Savoie	France	2.2	Nicolas Schnyder (SUI)	Price-Custom Bikes
18–20 June	Mainfranken-Tour	Germany	2.2U	Marc Goos (NED)	Cycling Team Jo Piels
19 June	Gran Premio Nobili Rubinetterie – Coppa Papà Carlo	Italy	1.1	Gianluca Brambilla (ITA)	Colnago–CSF Inox
20 June	Gran Premio Nobili Rubinetterie – Coppa Città di Stresa	Italy	1.1	Oscar Gatto (ITA)	ISD–NERI
20 June	GP Judendorf-Strassengel	Austria	1.2	Matthias Brändle (AUT)	Austria (national team)
20 June	Flèche Ardennaise	Belgium	1.2	Thomas Degand (BEL)	Verandas Willems
23 June	Halle–Ingooigem	Belgium	1.1	Jurgen Van De Walle (BEL)	Quick-Step
30 June	I.W.T. Jong Maar Moedig	Belgium	1.2	Sven Jodts (BEL)	Beveren 2000
30 June–4 July	Course de la Solidarité Olympique	Poland	2.1	Jacek Morajko (POL)	Mróz–Active Jet
3 July	Omloop Het Nieuwsblad U23	Belgium	1.2	Jarl Salomein (BEL)	Beveren 2000
4 July	Dwars door het Hageland	Belgium	1.2	Frédéric Amorison (BEL)	Landbouwkrediet
4 July	Giro delle Valli Aretine	Italy	1.2	Henry Frusto (ITA)	Scap Prefabbricati Foresi
4–11 July	Tour of Austria	Austria	2.HC	Riccardo Riccò (ITA)	Ceramica Flaminia
6 July	Trofeo Città di Brescia	Italy	1.2	Manuele Boaro (ITA)	U.C. Trevigiani–Dynamon–Bottoli
7–11 July	GP Torres Vedras	Portugal	2.2	Cândido Barbosa (POR)	Palmeiras–Resort–Prio
11 July	Giro del Medio Brenta	Italy	1.2	Luigi Miletta (ITA)	Gragnano Sporting Club
11 July	La Ronde Pévèloise	France	1.2	Frank Dressler (GER)	Continental Team Differdange
11 July	GP Stad Geel	Belgium	1.2	Timothy Dupont (BEL)	Jong Vlaanderen–Bauknecht
16 July	European Road Championships (U23) – Time Trial	Turkey	CC	Alex Dowsett (GBR)	Great Britain (national team)
17–18 July	Vuelta a la Comunidad de Madrid	Spain	2.1	Sergio Pardilla (ESP)	Carmiooro NGC
18 July	Giro del Casentino	Italy	1.2	Andrea Pasqualon (ITA)	Zalf Désirée Fior
18 July	European Road Championships (U23) – Road Race	Turkey	CC	Piotr Gawronski (POL)	Poland (national team)
21–25 July	Brixia Tour	Italy	2.1	Domenico Pozzovivo (ITA)	Colnago–CSF Inox
22 July	Gyomaendröd GP	Hungary	1.2	Alois Kaňkovský (CZE)	ASC Dukla Praha
22–25 July	Tour of Szeklerland	Romania	2.2	Evgeni Gerganov (BUL)	Hemus 1896–Vivelo
23–25 July	Pomerania Tour	Poland	2.2	Dirk Müller (GER)	Team Nutrixxion Sparkasse
24–26 July	Kreiz Breizh Elites	France	2.2	Johan Le Bon (FRA)	Bretagne–Schuller
24–28 July	Tour de Wallonie	Belgium	2.HC	Russell Downing (GBR)	Team Sky
25 July	Prueba Villafranca de Ordizia	Spain	1.1	Gorka Izagirre (ESP)	Euskaltel–Euskadi
25 July	GP de Pérenchies	France	1.2	Arnaud Démare (FRA)	CC Nogent-sur-Oise
27–31 July	Dookoła Mazowsza	Poland	2.2	Sebastian Forke (GER)	Team Nutrixxion Sparkasse
28 July–1 Aug	Tour Alsace	France	2.2	Wilco Kelderman (NED)	Rabobank Continental Team
1 August	Trofeo Matteotti	Italy	1.1	Riccardo Chiarini (ITA)	De Rosa–Stac Plastic
1 August	Circuito de Getxo	Spain	1.1	Francisco Pacheco (ESP)	Xacobeo–Galicia
1 August	La Poly Normande	France	1.1	Andy Cappelle (BEL)	Verandas Willems
3–7 August	Vuelta a León	Spain	2.2	Ángel Vallejo (ESP)	Supermercados Froiz
4–5 August	Paris–Corrèze	France	2.1	Mickaël Buffaz (FRA)	Cofidis
4–8 August	Tour des Pyrénées	France	2.2	Florent Barle (FRA)	AVC Aix-en-Provence
4–8 August	Danmark Rundt	Denmark	2.HC	Jakob Fuglsang (DEN)	Team Saxo Bank
4–8 August	Vuelta a Burgos	Spain	2.HC	Samuel Sánchez (ESP)	Euskaltel–Euskadi
4–15 August	Volta a Portugal	Portugal	2.1	David Blanco (ESP)	Palmeiras–Resort–Prio
5 August	Gran Premio Industria e Commercio Artigianato Carnaghese	Italy	1.1	Ivan Basso (ITA)	Liquigas–Doimo
5 August	GP Folignano	Italy	1.2	Julián Arredondo (COL)	Scap Prefabbricati Foresi
7 August	Gran Premio Città di Camaiore	Italy	1.1	Kristijan Koren (SLO)	Liquigas–Doimo
8 August	Sparkassen Giro	Germany	1.1	Niki Terpstra (NED)	Team Milram
8 August	Dwars door de Antwerpse Kempen	Belgium	1.2	Aidis Kruopis (LTU)	Palmans–Cras
8 August	Trofeo Bastianelli	Italy	1.2	Carmelo Pantò (ITA)	Gragnano Sporting Club
10–14 August	Tour de l'Ain	France	2.1	Haimar Zubeldia (ESP)	Team RadioShack
12–15 August	Mi-Août Bretonne	France	2.2	Jean-Luc Delpech (FRA)	Bretagne–Schuller
13 August	Dutch Food Valley Classic	Netherlands	1.HC	Edvald Boasson Hagen (NOR)	Team Sky
14 August	Memoriał Henryka Łasaka	Poland	1.2	Mariusz Witecki (POL)	Mróz Active Jet
14 August	GP Betonexpressz 2000	Hungary	1.2	Hrvoje Miholjević (CRO)	Loborika
15 August	Antwerpse Havenpijl	Belgium	1.2	Rob Goris (BEL)	Palmans–Cras
15 August	Puchar Uzdrowisk Karpackich	Poland	1.2	Marek Rutkiewicz (POL)	Mróz Active Jet
16 August	GP Capodarco	Italy	1.2	Enrico Battaglin (ITA)	Zalf Désirée Fior
17 August	Grote Prijs Stad Zottegem	Belgium	1.1	Stefan van Dijk (NED)	Verandas Willems
17 August	Gara Milionaria Montappone	Italy	1.2	Ilya Gorodnichev (RUS)	Gragnano Sporting Club
17 August	Tre Valli Varesine	Italy	1.HC	Dan Martin (IRL)	Garmin–Transitions
17–20 August	Tour du Limousin	France	2.1	Gustav Larsson (SWE)	Team Saxo Bank
18 August	Coppa Ugo Agostoni	Italy	1.1	Francesco Gavazzi (ITA)	Lampre–Farnese Vini
19 August	Coppa Bernocchi	Italy	1.1	Manuel Belletti (ITA)	Colnago–CSF Inox
20–22 August	Festningsrittet	Norway	2.2	Jesse Anthony (USA)	Kelly Benefit Strategies
21 August	Trofeo Melinda	Italy	1.1	Vincenzo Nibali (ITA)	Liquigas–Doimo
21 August	Puchar Ministra Obrony Narodowej	Poland	1.2	Bartłomiej Matysiak (POL)	CCC–Polsat–Polkowice
24 August	GP des Marbriers	France	1.2	Kevin Lacombe (CAN)	SpiderTech–Planet Energy
24–27 August	Tour du Poitou Charentes et de la Vienne	France	2.1	Jimmy Engoulvent (FRA)	Saur–Sojasun
24–29 August	Giro della Valle d'Aosta	Italy	2.2	Petr Ignatenko (RUS)	Itera–Katusha
25 August	Druivenkoers Overijse	Belgium	1.1	Björn Leukemans (BEL)	Vacansoleil
26–30 August	Tour of Victory	Turkey	2.2	Mert Mutlu (TUR)	Brisaspor
28 August	Giro del Veneto	Italy	1.1	Daniel Oss (ITA)	Liquigas–Doimo
28–29 August	Szlakiem walk Majora Hubala	Poland	2.2	Tomasz Kiendyś (POL)	CCC–Polsat–Polkowice
29 August	Châteauroux Classic	France	1.1	Anthony Ravard (FRA)	Ag2r–La Mondiale
29 August	Schaal Sels	Belgium	1.1	Aidis Kruopis (LTU)	Palmans–Cras
29 August	Ronde van Midden-Nederland	Netherlands	1.2	Wesley Kreder (NED)	Rabobank Continental Team
29 August	Zagreb–Ljubljana	Slovenia	1.2	Matej Mugerli (SLO)	Perutnina Ptuj
31 August–7 September	Tour de Slovaquie	Slovakia	2.2	Robert Vrečer (SLO)	Perutnina Ptuj
5 September	Giro della Romagna	Italy	1.1	Patrik Sinkewitz (GER)	ISD–NERI
5 September	Tour du Doubs	France	1.1	Jérôme Coppel (FRA)	Saur–Sojasun
5 September	Grote Prijs Jef Scherens	Belgium	1.1	Lars Boom (NED)	Rabobank
5 September	Memorial Davide Fardelli	Italy	1.2	Luke Durbridge (AUS)	Team Jayco–Skins
5 September	Kernen Omloop Echt-Susteren	Netherlands	1.2	Peter Schulting (NED)	Cycling Team Jo Piels
5–12 September	Tour de l'Avenir	France	2.Ncup	Nairo Quintana (COL)	Colombia (national team)
8 September	Memorial Rik Van Steenbergen	Belgium	1.1	Michael Van Staeyen (BEL)	Topsport Vlaanderen–Mercator
8–11 September	Giro del Friuli-Venezia Giulia	Italy	2.2	Vegard Laengen (NOR)	Norway (national team)
11 September	Paris–Brussels	Belgium	1.HC	Francisco Ventoso (ESP)	Carmiooro NGC
11–18 September	Tour of Britain	United Kingdom	2.1	Michael Albasini (SUI)	Team HTC–Columbia
12 September	Chrono Champenois	France	1.2	Rasmus Quaade (DEN)	Team Designa Køkken–Blue Water
12 September	Grand Prix de Fourmies	France	1.HC	Romain Feillu (FRA)	Vacansoleil
12–19 September	Tour of Bulgaria	Bulgaria	2.2	Krassimir Vassiliev (BUL)	SK Dobrich
15 September	Grand Prix de Wallonie	Belgium	1.1	Paul Martens (GER)	Rabobank
17 September	GP de la Somme	France	1.1	Martin Elmiger (SUI)	Ag2r–La Mondiale
17 September	Kampioenschap van Vlaanderen	Belgium	1.1	Leigh Howard (AUS)	Team HTC–Columbia
18 September	GP Città di Modena	Italy	1.1	Francesco Chicchi (ITA)	Liquigas–Doimo
19 September	Grand Prix d'Isbergues	France	1.1	Aleksejs Saramotins (LAT)	Team HTC–Columbia
19 September	Gran Premio Industria e Commercio di Prato	Italy	1.1	Diego Ulissi (ITA)	Lampre–Farnese Vini
19 September	Trofeo Gianfranco Bianchin	Italy	1.2	Robert Vrečer (SLO)	Perutnina Ptuj
19 September	Duo Normand	France	1.2	Artem Ovechkin (RUS); Alexandre Pliușchin (MDA)	Team Katusha
22 September	Omloop van het Houtland Lichtervelde	Belgium	1.1	Stefan van Dijk (NED)	Verandas Willems
24–26 September	Tour du Gévaudan Languedoc-Roussillon	France	2.2	Jérôme Coppel (FRA)	Saur–Sojasun
25 September	Memorial Marco Pantani	Italy	1.1	Elia Viviani (ITA)	Liquigas–Doimo
25 September	Praha-Karlovy Vary-Praha	Czech Republic	1.2	Andreas Schillinger (GER)	Team NetApp
26 September	Tour de Vendée	France	1.HC	Koldo Fernández (ESP)	Euskaltel–Euskadi
26 September	Giro di Toscana	Italy	1.1	Daniele Bennati (ITA)	Liquigas–Doimo
26 September–5 October	Tour of Civilizations	Turkey	2.2		
28 September	Ruota d'Oro	Italy	1.2	Francesco Bongiorno (ITA)	Team Futura-Matricardi
30 September–3 October	Circuit Franco-Belge	Belgium	2.1	Adam Blythe (GBR)	Omega Pharma–Lotto
1–3 October	Cinturó de l'Empordà	Spain	2.2	José Herrada (ESP)	Caja Rural
2 October	Piccolo Giro di Lombardia	Italy	1.2	Alexandre Serebryakov (RUS)	A.C.S. Lupi-San Marino
3 October	Münsterland Giro	Germany	1.1	Joost van Leijen (NED)	Vacansoleil
5 October	Binche–Tournai–Binche	Belgium	1.1	Elia Viviani (ITA)	Liquigas–Doimo
7 October	Paris–Bourges	France	1.1	Anthony Ravard (FRA)	Ag2r–La Mondiale
7 October	Coppa Sabatini	Italy	1.1	Riccardo Riccò (ITA)	Vacansoleil
9 October	Giro dell'Emilia	Italy	1.HC	Robert Gesink (NED)	Rabobank
10 October	Gran Premio Bruno Beghelli	Italy	1.1	Dario Cataldo (ITA)	Quick-Step
10 October	Paris–Tours Espoirs	France	1.2U	Jelle Wallays (BEL)	Beveren 2000
10 October	Paris–Tours	France	1.HC	Óscar Freire (ESP)	Rabobank
12 October	Nationale Sluitingsprijs	Belgium	1.1	Adam Blythe (GBR)	Omega Pharma–Lotto
14 October	Giro del Piemonte	Italy	1.HC	Philippe Gilbert (BEL)	Omega Pharma–Lotto
17 October	Chrono des Nations	France	1.1	David Millar (GBR)	Garmin–Transitions

== Final ranking ==
There is a competition for the rider, team and country with the most points gained from winning or achieving a high place in the above races.

=== Individual classification ===
Rank	Name	Points
1	Giovanni Visconti (ITA)	787
2	Stefan van Dijk (NED)	653
3	Riccardo Riccò (ITA)	569
4	Domenico Pozzovivo (ITA)	493
5	Romain Feillu (FRA)	482
6	Marco Marcato (ITA)	457
7	Jens Keukeleire (BEL)	378
8	Sergio Pardilla (ESP)	363
9	Francisco Ventoso (ESP)	361
10	Enrico Rossi (ITA)	360

=== Team classification ===
Rank	Team	Points
1	Vacansoleil	2624.4
2	Saur–Sojasun	1564
3	ISD–NERI	1503.2
4	Cofidis	1481
5	Carmiooro NGC	1456
6	Androni Giocattoli	1184
7	Colnago–CSF Inox	1158
8	Topsport Vlaanderen–Mercator	1141
9	Verandas Willems	1089
10	Skil–Shimano	1072

=== Nation classification ===
Rank	Nation	Points
1	Italy	4166.6
2	France	3000.4
3	Spain	2426.8
4	Netherlands	2267.2
5	Belgium	1989
6	Germany	1720.2
7	Slovenia	1551
8	Poland	1390
9	Russia	1278
10	Portugal	775

=== Nation under-23 classification ===
Rank	Nation under-23	Points
1	Belgium	1299
2	Netherlands	1140
3	Italy	1018
4	France	834
5	Germany	638
6	Slovenia	585
7	Poland	362
8	Lithuania	235
9	Russia	223
10	Belarus	213
