= 2025 UCI Oceania Tour =

21st season of the UCI Oceania Tour

- Twenty-first edition of the UCI Oceania Tour

Details
- Dates: 30 January
- Location: Australia
- Races: 1

The 2025 UCI Oceania Tour was the 21st season of the UCI Oceania Tour. It only consisted of a single race, the Surf Coast Classic, on 30 January 2025.

The UCI ratings from highest to lowest were are as follows:

- Multi-day events: 2.1 and 2.2
- One-day events: 1.1 and 1.2

== Events ==
Races in the 2025 UCI Oceania Tour
Race	Rating	Date	Winner	Team	Ref
(Australia) Surf Coast Classic	1.1	30 January	Tobias Lund Andresen (DEN)	Team Picnic–PostNL	
(New Zealand) Gravel and Tar Classic	1.2	Cancelled			
