= AVC Aix Provence Dole =

French road cycling team

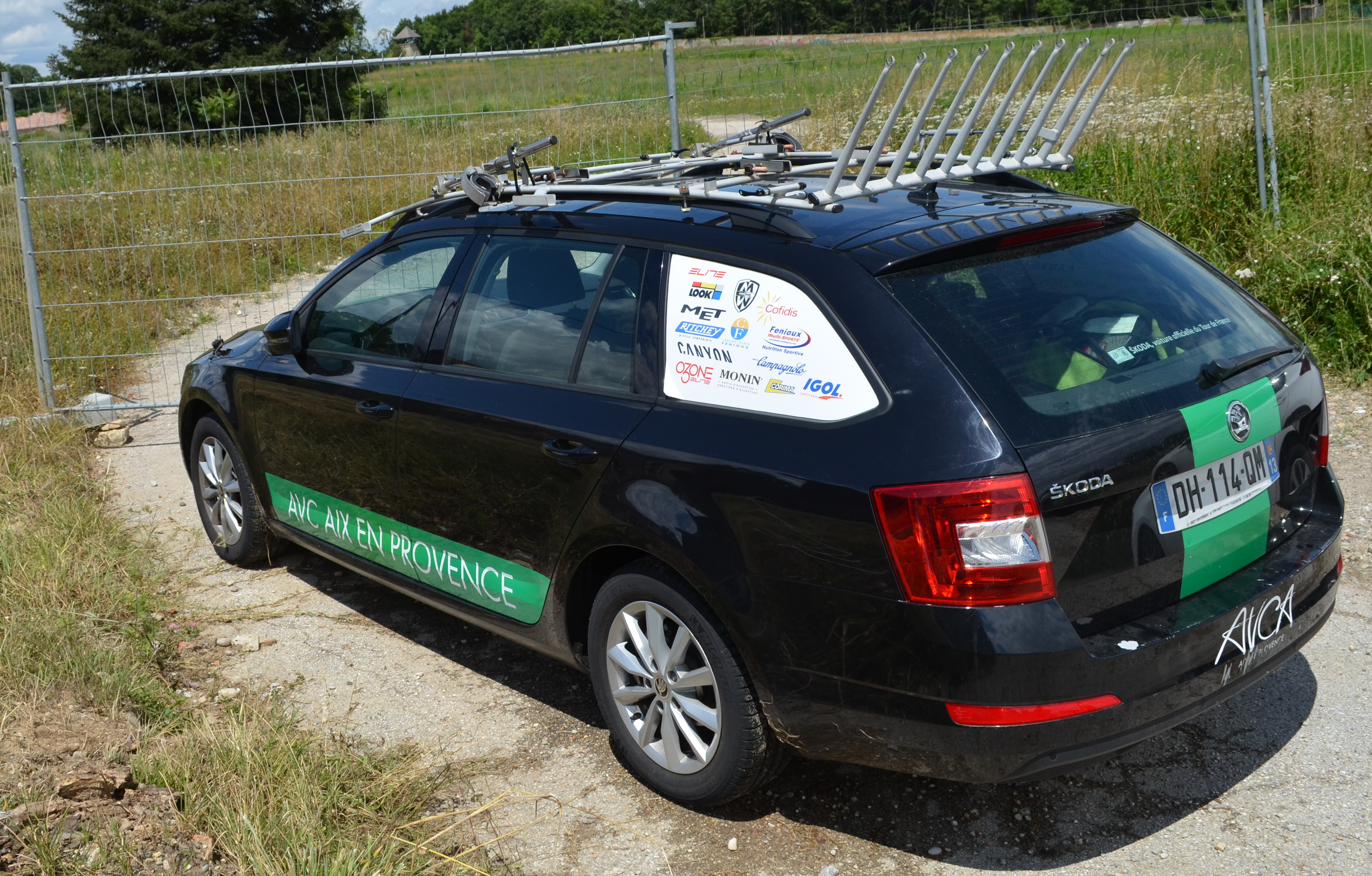
- A team car in 2016

Team information
- UCI code: AIX
- Registered: France
- Founded: 1925
- Discipline: Road
- Status: DN1 (–2024); UCI Continental (2025–)

Key personnel
- General manager: Jean-Michel Bourgouin
- Team managers: Sébastien Cottier; Jean-François Rodriguez; Olivier Presse; Tristan Delacroix

Team name history
- 1925–2024 2025–: AVC Aix-en-Provence; AVC Aix Provence Dole

AVC Aix Provence Dole is a French UCI Continental road cycling team established in 1925. Until 2025, it was a national first-division (DN1) club team.

The team still maintains a club status team in addition to the Continental squad.
