= Kelapa Gading Bikers =

Indonesian cycling team

Team information
- UCI code: KGB
- Registered: Indonesia
- Founded: 2018
- Discipline: Road
- Status: Amateur (2018–2022); UCI Continental (2023–)

Team name history
- 2018–2022; 2022–: KGB Jakarta; Kelapa Gading Bikers

Kelapa Gading Bikers is an Indonesian UCI Continental cycling team focusing on road bicycle racing. The team is an extension of the cycling club by the same name which was established in 1993.

== Team roster ==
As of 4 March 2023

Rider	Date of birth
Jefri Irawan (INA)	26 January 1994 (age 32)
Terry Yudha Kusuma (INA)	14 March 1999 (age 27)
Kevin Maulana (INA)	28 June 2000 (age 26)
Yosandy Darmawan Oetomo (INA)	26 April 2000 (age 26)
Jaya Sedana Putra Pande Made (INA)	5 November 2003 (age 22)

Rider	Date of birth
Dealton Nur Arif Prayogo (INA)	27 November 1993 (age 32)
Daniel Purwanto (INA)	8 March 2001 (age 25)
Muhammad Reihan (INA)	21 March 1995 (age 31)
Qaris Maxu Irwandi Setra (INA)	10 September 2000 (age 25)
Fajar Wijaya (INA)	17 January 1998 (age 28)

== Major wins ==
2018
Indonesia National Time Trial Championships M35–39, Roy Aldrie Widhijanto
2023
Stage 3 Tour of Thailand, Terry Yudha Kusuma

== National champions ==
2018
Indonesian M35–39 National Time Trial Championships, Roy Aldrie Widhijanto
