= 2019 UCI Europe Tour =

Fifteenth season of the UCI Europe Tour

- Fifteenth edition of the UCI Europe Tour

Details
- Dates: 31 January – 20 October
- Location: Europe
- Races: +200

The 2019 UCI Europe Tour was the fifteenth season of the UCI Europe Tour. The 2019 season began on 31 January 2019 with the Trofeo Porreres, Felanitx, Ses Salines, Campos and ended on 20 October 2019.

Throughout the season, points are awarded to the top finishers of stages within stage races and the final general classification standings of each of the stages races and one-day events. The quality and complexity of a race also determines how many points are awarded to the top finishers, the higher the UCI rating of a race, the more points are awarded.

The UCI ratings from highest to lowest are as follows:

- Multi-day events: 2.HC, 2.1 and 2.2
- One-day events: 1.HC, 1.1 and 1.2

== Events ==
=== January ===
Date	Race name	Location	UCI Rating	Winner	Team	Ref
31 January	Trofeo Porreres, Felanitx, Ses Salines, Campos	Spain	1.1	Jesús Herrada (ESP)	Cofidis	

=== February ===
Date	Race name	Location	UCI Rating	Winner	Team	Ref
1 February	Trofeo Andratx Lloseta	Spain	1.1	Emanuel Buchmann (GER)	Bora–Hansgrohe	
2 February	Trofeo de Tramuntana	Spain	1.1	Tim Wellens (BEL)	Lotto–Soudal	
3 February	Grand Prix La Marseillaise	France	1.1	Anthony Turgis (FRA)	Total Direct Énergie	
3 February	Trofeo Palma	Spain	1.1	Marcel Kittel (GER)	Team Katusha–Alpecin	
9 February	Grand Prix Gazipaşa	Turkey	1.2	Branislau Samoilau (BLR)	Minsk Cycling Club	
6–10 February	Volta a la Comunitat Valenciana	Spain	2.1	Ion Izagirre (ESP)	Astana	
6–10 February	Étoile de Bessèges	France	2.1	Christophe Laporte (FRA)	Cofidis	
10 February	Grand Prix Alanya	Turkey	1.2	Lucas Carstensen (GER)	Bike Aid	
16 February	Vuelta a Murcia	Spain	1.1	Luis León Sánchez (ESP)	Astana	
14–17 February	Tour de la Provence	France	2.1	Gorka Izagirre (ESP)	Astana	
17 February	Trofeo Laigueglia	Italy	1.HC	Simone Velasco (ITA)	Neri Sottoli–Selle Italia–KTM	
17 February	Clásica de Almería	Spain	1.HC	Pascal Ackermann (GER)	Bora–Hansgrohe	
20–24 February	Vuelta a Andalucía	Spain	2.HC	Jakob Fuglsang (DEN)	Astana	
20–24 February	Volta ao Algarve	Portugal	2.HC	Tadej Pogačar (SLO)	UAE Team Emirates	
21–24 February	Tour of Antalya	Turkey	2.2	Szymon Rekita (POL)	Leopard Pro Cycling	
22–24 February	Tour du Haut Var	France	2.1	Thibaut Pinot (FRA)	Groupama–FDJ	
24 February	GP Izola	Slovenia	1.2	Marko Kump (SLO)	Adria Mobil	

=== March ===
Date	Race name	Location	UCI Rating	Winner	Team	Ref
2 March	Classic de l'Ardèche Rhône Crussol	France	1.1	Lilian Calmejane (FRA)	Total Direct Énergie	
3 March	International Rhodes Grand Prix	Greece	1.2	Dušan Rajović (SRB)	Adria Mobil	
3 March	Royal Bernard Drôme Classic	France	1.1	Alexis Vuillermoz (FRA)	AG2R La Mondiale	
3 March	Kuurne–Brussels–Kuurne	Belgium	1.HC	Bob Jungels (LUX)	Deceuninck–Quick-Step	
5 March	Le Samyn	Belgium	1.1	Florian Sénéchal (FRA)	Deceuninck–Quick-Step	
6 March	Trofej Umag	Croatia	1.2	Alois Kaňkovský (CZE)	Elkov–Author	
9 March	Grand Prix Velo Alanya	Turkey	1.2	Nikolai Shumov (BLR)	Minsk Cycling Club	
9 March	Poreč Trophy	Croatia	1.2	Fabian Lienhard (SUI)	IAM–Excelsior	
8–10 March	International Tour of Rhodes	Greece	2.2	Martijn Budding (NED)	BEAT Cycling Club	
10 March	GP Industria & Artigianato di Larciano	Italy	1.HC	Maximilian Schachmann (GER)	Bora–Hansgrohe	
10 March	Dorpenomloop Rucphen	Netherlands	1.2	Canceled due to stormy weather conditions		
10 March	Grote Prijs Jean-Pierre Monseré	Belgium	1.1	Canceled due to stormy weather conditions		
10 March	Grand Prix Justiniano Hotels	Turkey	1.2	Onur Balkan (TUR)	Salcano–Sakarya BB Team	
10 March	Grand Prix de la Ville de Lillers	France	1.2	Canceled due to stormy weather conditions		
14–17 March	Istrian Spring Trophy	Croatia	2.2	Felix Gall (AUT)	Development Team Sunweb	
17 March	Ronde van Drenthe	Netherlands	1.HC	Pim Ligthart (NED)	Total Direct Énergie	
17 March	Clássica da Arrábida	Portugal	1.2	Jonathan Lastra (ESP)	Caja Rural–Seguros RGA	
17 March	Paris–Troyes	France	1.2	Jérémy Cabot (FRA)	SCO Dijon	
17 March	La Popolarissima	Italy	1.2	Nicola Venchiarutti (ITA)	Cycling Team Friuli	
20 March	Nokere Koerse	Belgium	1.HC	Cees Bol (NED)	Team Sunweb	
20–24 March	Volta ao Alentejo	Portugal	2.2	João Rodrigues (POR)	W52 / FC Porto	
22 March	Bredene Koksijde Classic	Belgium	1.HC	Pascal Ackermann (GER)	Bora–Hansgrohe	
22 March	Youngster Coast Challenge	Belgium	1.2U	Niklas Märkl (GER)	Development Team Sunweb	
24 March	Grand Prix de Denain	France	1.HC	Mathieu van der Poel (NED)	Corendon–Circus	
25–31 March	Tour de Normandie	France	2.2	Ole Forfang (NOR)	Joker Fuel of Norway	
27–31 March	Settimana Internazionale di Coppi e Bartali	Italy	2.1	Lucas Hamilton (AUS)	Mitchelton–Scott	
30 March	Classic Loire Atlantique	France	1.1	Rudy Barbier (FRA)	Israel Cycling Academy	
31 March	Gent–Wevelgem/Kattekoers–Ieper	Belgium	1.Ncup	Jonas Rutsch (GER)	Team Lotto–Kern Haus	
31 March	Cholet-Pays de la Loire	France	1.1	Marc Sarreau (FRA)	Groupama–FDJ	

=== April ===
Date	Race name	Location	UCI Rating	Winner	Team	Ref
3–6 April	Giro di Sicilia	Italy	2.1	Brandon McNulty (USA)	Rally UHC Cycling	
5 April	Route Adélie	France	1.1	Marc Sarreau (FRA)	Groupama–FDJ	
5–7 April	Le Triptyque des Monts et Châteaux	Belgium	2.2	Mikkel Bjerg (DEN)	Hagens Berman Axeon	
6 April	GP Miguel Induráin	Spain	1.1	Jonathan Hivert (FRA)	Total Direct Énergie	
6 April	Volta Limburg Classic	Netherlands	1.1	Patrick Müller (SUI)	Vital Concept–B&B Hotels	
7 April	GP Adria Mobil	Slovenia	1.2	Marko Kump (SVN)	Adria Mobil	
7 April	La Roue Tourangelle	France	1.1	Lionel Taminiaux (BEL)	Wallonie Bruxelles	
7 April	Vuelta a La Rioja	Spain	1.1	Canceled		
7 April	Trofeo Banca Popolare di Vicenza	Italy	1.2U	Georg Zimmermann (GER)	Tirol KTM Cycling Team	
9–12 April	Circuit de la Sarthe	France	2.1	Alexis Gougeard (FRA)	AG2R La Mondiale	
10 April	Scheldeprijs	Belgium	1.HC	Fabio Jakobsen (NED)	Deceuninck–Quick-Step	
12–14 April	Circuit des Ardennes	France	2.2	Alexander Kamp (DEN)	Riwal Readynez	
12–14 April	GP Beiras e Serra da Estrela	Portugal	2.1	Edwin Ávila (COL)	Israel Cycling Academy	
13 April	Ronde van Vlaanderen U23	Belgium	1.Ncup	Andreas Stokbro (DEN)	Riwal Readynez	
13 April	Trofeo Edil C	Italy	1.2U	Giovanni Aleotti (ITA)	Cycling Team Friuli	
14 April	Klasika Primavera	Spain	1.1	Carlos Betancur (COL)	Movistar Team	
16 April	Paris–Camembert	France	1.1	Benoît Cosnefroy (FRA)	AG2R La Mondiale	
17 April	Brabantse Pijl	Belgium	1.HC	Mathieu van der Poel (NED)	Corendon–Circus	
17–21 April	Tour du Loir-et-Cher	France	2.2	Jan Bárta (CZE)	Elkov–Author	
18–21 April	Belgrade–Banja Luka	Serbia; Bosnia and Herzegovina	2.1	Paweł Franczak (POL)	Voster ATS Team	
20 April	Tour du Finistère	France	1.1	Julien Simon (FRA)	Cofidis	
20 April	Liège–Bastogne–Liège U23	Belgium	1.2U	Kevin Vermaerke (USA)	Hagens Berman Axeon	
20 April	Arno Wallaard Memorial	Netherlands	1.2	Alexander Richardson (GBR)	Canyon dhb p/b Bloor Homes	
21 April	Trofeo Città di San Vendemiano; GP Industria e Commercio di Prato	Italy	1.2U	Andrea Bagioli (ITA)	Team Colpack	
22 April	Tro-Bro Léon	France	1.1	Andrea Vendrame (ITA)	Androni Giocattoli–Sidermec	
22 April	Giro del Belvedere	Italy	1.2U	Samuele Battistella (ITA)	Team Dimension Data	
22–26 April	Tour of the Alps	Italy	2.HC	Pavel Sivakov (RUS)	Team Sky	
23 April	Gran Premio Palio del Recioto; Trofeo C&F Resinatura Blocchi	Italy	1.2U	Matteo Sobrero (ITA)	Team Dimension Data	
25 April	Gran Premio della Liberazione	Italy	1.2U	Canceled		
25–28 April	Tour of Mersin	Turkey	2.2	Peter Koning (NED)	Bike Aid	
25 April–1 May	Tour de Bretagne	France	2.2	Lorrenzo Manzin (FRA)	Vital Concept–B&B Hotels	
25–27 April	Vuelta a Castilla y León	Spain	2.1	Davide Cimolai (ITA)	Israel Cycling Academy	
27–28 April	Tour du Jura	France	2.1	Kobe Goossens (BEL)	Lotto–Soudal	
28 April	Visegrad 4 Bicycle Race	Poland	1.2	Alois Kaňkovský (CZE)	Elkov–Author	
28 April	Giro dell'Appennino	Italy	1.1	Mattia Cattaneo (ITA)	Androni Giocattoli–Sidermec	
28 April	Rutland–Melton International CiCLE Classic	United Kingdom	1.2	Colin Joyce (USA)	Rally UHC Cycling	
30 April–5 May	Carpathian Couriers Race	Poland	2.2U	Marijn van den Berg (NED)	Metec–TKH	

=== May ===
Date	Race name	Location	UCI Rating	Winner	Team	Ref
1 May	Memoriał Andrzeja Trochanowskiego	Poland	1.2	Alois Kaňkovský (CZE)	Elkov–Author	
1 May	Eschborn–Frankfurt Under-23	Germany	1.2U	Frederik Madsen (DEN)	Team ColoQuick	
1–5 May	Five Rings of Moscow	Russia	2.2	Yauhen Sobal (BLR)	Minsk Cycling Club	
2 May	Memoriał Romana Siemińskiego	Poland	1.2	Alois Kaňkovský (CZE)	Elkov–Author	
2–5 May	Tour of Mesopotamia	Turkey	2.2	Branislau Samoilau (BLR)	Minsk Cycling Club	
2–5 May	Tour de Yorkshire	United Kingdom	2.HC	Chris Lawless (GBR)	Team Ineos	
3–5 May	Vuelta a Asturias	Spain	2.1	Richard Carapaz (ECU)	Movistar Team	
4 May	GP Himmerland Rundt	Denmark	1.2	Niklas Larsen (DEN)	Team ColoQuick	
4 May	Ronde van Overijssel	Netherlands	1.2	Nils Eekhoff (NED)	Development Team Sunweb	
4 May	Étoile d'or	France	1.Ncup	Alexander Konychev (ITA)	Dimension Data for Qhubeka	
5 May	Skive–Løbet	Denmark	1.2	Frederik Madsen (DEN)	Team ColoQuick	
5 May	Circuito del Porto	Italy	1.2	Luca Mozzato (ITA)	Dimension Data for Qhubeka	
5 May	Entre Brenne et Montmorillonnais	France	1.2	Alberto Dainese (ITA)	SEG Racing Academy	
9–12 May	Rhône-Alpes Isère Tour	France	2.2	Matthias Krizek (AUT)	Team Felbermayr–Simplon Wels	
10–12 May	Szlakiem Grodów Piastowskich	Poland	2.2	Kamil Małecki (POL)	CCC Development Team	
10–12 May	Vuelta a la Comunidad de Madrid	Spain	2.1	Clément Russo (FRA)	Arkéa–Samsic	
11 May	Scandinavian Race Uppsala	Sweden	1.2	Rasmus Wallin (DEN)	Riwal Readynez	
11 May	Minsk Cup	Belarus	1.2	Yauheni Karaliok (BLR)	Minsk Cycling Club	
11 May	Sundvolden GP	Norway	1.2	Trond Trondsen (NOR)	Team Coop	
11 May	Visegrad 4 Bicycle Race	Hungary	1.2	Paweł Franczak (POL)	CCC Development Team	
11 May	PWZ Zuidenveld Tour	Netherlands	1.2	Luuc Bugter (NED)	BEAT Cycling Club	
12 May	Grand Prix Minsk	Belarus	1.2	Norman Vahtra (EST)	Klubi Cycling Tartu	
12 May	Visegrad 4 Bicycle Race	Slovakia	1.2	Alois Kaňkovský (CZE)	Elkov–Author	
12 May	Ringerike GP	Norway	1.2	Kristoffer Skjerping (NOR)	Uno-X Norwegian Development Team	
12 May	Gran Premio Industrie del Marmo	Italy	1.2U	Patrick Gamper (AUT)	Tirol KTM Cycling Team	
12 May	Grand Prix de la Somme	France	1.2	Lorrenzo Manzin (FRA)	Vital Concept–B&B Hotels	
12 May	Flèche Ardennaise	Belgium	1.2	Simon Pellaud (SWI)	IAM–Excelsior	
14–19 May	Four Days of Dunkirk	France	2.HC	Mike Teunissen (NED)	Team Jumbo–Visma	
17–19 May	Vuelta a Aragón	Spain	2.1	Eduard Prades (ESP)	Movistar Team	
17–19 May	Tour of Black Sea	Turkey	2.2	Onur Balkan (TUR)	Salcano–Sakarya BB Team	
17–19 May	Tour d'Eure-et-Loir	France	2.2	Gerben Thijssen (BEL)	Lotto–Soudal U23	
19 May	Grand Prix Criquielion	Belgium	1.2	Arne Marit (BEL)	Lotto–Soudal U23	
20–24 May	Tour of Albania	Albania	2.2	Filippo Fiorelli (ITA)	Gragnano Sporting Club	
22–26 May	Bałtyk–Karkonosze Tour	Poland	2.2	Kamil Małecki (POL)	CCC Development Team	
23 May	Chabany Race	Ukraine	1.2	Andriy Vasylyuk (UKR)	Kyiv Capital Racing	
23–25 May	Tour of Estonia	Estonia	2.1	Mihkel Räim (EST)	Israel Cycling Academy	
23–26 May	Ronde de l'Isard	France	2.2U	Andrea Bagioli (ITA)	Team Colpack	
24 May	Race Horizon Park for Peace	Ukraine	1.2	Yauhen Sobal (BLR)	Minsk Cycling Club	
24–26 May	Paris-Arras Tour	France	2.2	Ethan Hayter (GBR)	VC Londres	
24–26 May	Tour de l'Ain	France	2.1	Thibaut Pinot (FRA)	Groupama–FDJ	
24–26 May	Hammer Stavanger	Norway	2.1		Team Jumbo–Visma	
25 May	Race Horizon Park Maidan	Ukraine	1.2	Uladzislai Tsimoshyk (BLR)	RCOP Belarus	
26 May	Grote Prijs Marcel Kint	Belgium	1.1	Bryan Coquard (FRA)	Vital Concept–B&B Hotels	
26 May	Race Horizon Park Classic	Ukraine	1.2	Andriy Vasylyuk (UKR)	Kyiv Capital Racing	
28 May – 2 June	Tour of Norway	Norway	2.HC	Alexander Kristoff (NOR)	UAE Team Emirates	
29 May – 2 June	Flèche du Sud	Luxembourg	2.1	Quinten Hermans (BEL)	Telenet–Fidea Lions	
30 May	Circuit de Wallonie	Belgium	1.1	Thomas Boudat (FRA)	Total Direct Énergie	
30 May – 2 June	Szlakiem Walk Majora Hubala	Poland	2.1	Maciej Paterski (POL)	Wibatech Merx 7R	
31 May – 2 June	Tour de la Mirabelle	France	2.2	Simon Pellaud (SUI)	IAM–Excelsior	

=== June ===
Date	Race name	Location	UCI Rating	Winner	Team	Ref
1 June	Grand Prix de Plumelec-Morbihan	France	1.1	Benoît Cosnefroy (FRA)	AG2R La Mondiale	
1 June	Tour de Ribas	Ukraine	1.2	Onur Balkan (TUR)	Salcano–Sakarya BB Team	
1–2 June	Orlen Nations Grand Prix	Poland	2.Ncup	Nicolas Prodhomme (FRA)	AG2R La Mondiale	
2 June	Trofeo Alcide Degasperi	Italy	1.2	Ben Hill (AUS)	Ljubljana Gusto Santic	
2 June	Boucles de l'Aulne	France	1.1	Alexis Gougeard (FRA)	AG2R La Mondiale	
2 June	Odessa Grand Prix	Ukraine	1.2	Matvey Nikitin (KAZ)	Vino–Astana Motors	
2 June	Rund um Köln	Germany	1.1	Baptiste Planckaert (BEL)	Wallonie Bruxelles	
2 June	Paris–Roubaix Espoirs	France	1.2U	Tom Pidcock (GBR)	Team Wiggins Le Col	
5–9 June	Tour de Serbie	Serbia	2.2	Enrico Salvador (ITA)	Northwave Cofiloc	
5–9 June	Tour de Luxembourg	Luxembourg	2.HC	Jesús Herrada (ESP)	Cofidis	
6–9 June	Grand Prix Priessnitz spa	Czech Republic	2.Ncup	Andreas Leknessund (NOR)	Uno-X Norwegian Development Team	
6–9 June	Boucles de la Mayenne	France	2.1	Thibault Ferasse (FRA)	Natura4Ever–Roubaix–Lille Métropole	
6–9 June	Tour of Bihor	Romania	2.1	Daniel Muñoz (COL)	Androni Giocattoli–Sidermec	
7–9 June	Hammer Limburg	Netherlands	2.1		Deceuninck–Quick-Step	
9 June	Memorial Van Coningsloo	Belgium	1.2	Gerben Thijssen (BEL)	Lotto–Soudal U23	
9 June	Gran Premio di Lugano	Switzerland	1.1	Diego Ulissi (ITA)	UAE Team Emirates	
9 June	Coppa della Pace–Trofeo Fratelli Anelli	Italy	1.2U	Matteo Sobrero (ITA)	Dimension Data for Qhubeka	
10 June	Ronde van Limburg	Belgium	1.1	Eduard-Michael Grosu (ROU)	Delko–Marseille Provence	
11 June	Bursa Orhangazi Race	Turkey	1.2	Onur Balkan (TUR)	Salcano–Sakarya BB Team	
11–16 June	Tour de Hongrie	Hungary	2.1	Krists Neilands (LVA)	Israel Cycling Academy	
12 June	Bursa Yıldırım Bayezıt Race	Turkey	1.2	Mustafa Sayar (TUR)	Salcano–Sakarya BB Team	
12–16 June	Tour of Belgium	Belgium	2.HC	Remco Evenepoel (BEL)	Deceuninck–Quick-Step	
13 June	Grand Prix of Aargau Canton	Switzerland	1.HC	Alexander Kristoff (NOR)	UAE Team Emirates	
13–16 June	Ronde de l'Oise	France	2.2	Anthony Maldonado (FRA)	St. Michel–Auber93	
13–16 June	Oberösterreich Rundfahrt	Austria	2.2	Jannik Steimle (GER)	Team Vorarlberg Santic	
13–23 June	Girobio	Italy	2.2U	Andrés Ardila (COL)	Team Manzana Postobón	
14–16 June	Tour of Małopolska	Poland	2.2	Adam Stachowiak (POL)	Voster ATS Team	
16 June	Midden–Brabant Poort Omloop	Netherlands	1.2	Arvid de Kleijn (NED)	Alecto Cycling Team	
17 June	Mont Ventoux Dénivelé Challenge	France	1.1	Jesús Herrada (ESP)	Cofidis	
19–23 June	Tour of Slovenia	Slovenia	2.HC	Diego Ulissi (ITA)	UAE Team Emirates	
19–23 June	ZLM Tour	Netherlands	2.1	Mike Teunissen (NED)	Team Jumbo–Visma	
20–23 June	Route d'Occitanie-La Dépêche du Midi	France	2.1	Alejandro Valverde (ESP)	Movistar Team	
20–23 June	Tour de Savoie Mont-Blanc	France	2.2	Chris Harper (AUS)	Team BridgeLane	
21 June	Dwars door het Hageland	Belgium	1.1	Kenneth Vanbilsen (BEL)	Cofidis	
22 June	Heistse Pijl	Belgium	1.1	Álvaro Hodeg (COL)	Deceuninck–Quick-Step	
22 June	Grand Prix Doliny Baryczy Żmigród; Memorial Grundmanna I Wizowskiego	Poland	1.2	Sylwester Janiszewski (POL)	Wibatech Merx 7R	
23 June	Elfstedenronde	Belgium	1.1	Tim Merlier (BEL)	Corendon–Circus	
23 June	Korona Kocich Gór	Poland	1.2	Patryk Stosz (POL)	CCC Development Team	
26 June	Internationale Wielertrofee Jong Maar Moedig	Belgium	1.2	Julien Van Den Brande (BEL)	Tarteletto–Isorex	
26 June	Halle–Ingooigem	Belgium	1.1	Dries De Bondt (BEL)	Corendon–Circus	

=== July ===
Date	Race name	Location	UCI Rating	Winner	Team	Ref
2 July	Trofeo Città di Brescia	Italy	1.2	Daniel Smarzaro (ITA)	General Store Bottoli Zardini	
2–6 July	Course de la Solidarité Olympique	Poland	2.2	Norman Vahtra (EST)	Klubi Cycling Tartu	
3–7 July	Sibiu Cycling Tour	Romania	2.1	Kevin Rivera (CRC)	Androni Giocattoli–Sidermec	
6–7 July	In The Steps of Romans	Bulgaria	2.2	Polychronis Tzortzakis (GRE)	Tarteletto–Isorex	
6–12 July	Tour of Austria	Austria	2.1	Ben Hermans (BEL)	Israel Cycling Academy	
11–14 July	Grande Prémio Internacional de Torres Vedras; Troféu Joaquim Agostinho	Portugal	2.2	Henrique Casimiro (POR)	Efapel	
14 July	Giro del Medio Brenta	Italy	1.2	Simone Ravanelli (ITA)	Biesse–Carrera	
16–21 July	Giro della Valle d'Aosta	Italy	2.2U	Mauri Vansevenant (BEL)	EFC-LR-Vulsteke	
20 July	V4 Special Series Vasarosnameny – Nyiregyhaza	Hungary	1.2	Daniel Auer (AUT)	Maloja Pushbikers	
21 July	V4 Special Series Vasarosnameny – Ibrany	Hungary	1.2	János Pelikán (HUN)	Pannon Cycling Team	
24–27 July	Dookoła Mazowsza	Poland	1.2	Stanislaw Aniolkowski (POL)	CCC Development Team	
24–28 July	Adriatica Ionica Race	Italy	2.1	Mark Padun (UKR)	Bahrain–Merida	
25 July	Prueba Villafranca de Ordizia	Spain	1.1	Rafael Valls (ESP)	Movistar Team	
25 July	Grand Prix Pino Cerami	Belgium	1.1	Bryan Coquard (FRA)	Vital Concept–B&B Hotels	
26 July	Grand Prix Cycliste de Gemenc I	Hungary	1.2	Attila Valter (HUN)	CCC Team	
26–28 July	Tour of Kosovo	Kosovo	2.2	Charalampos Kastrantas (GRE)	Brunei Continental Cycling Team	
27 July	Grand Prix Cycliste de Gemenc II	Hungary	1.2	János Pelikán (HUN)	Pannon Cycling Team	
27–31 July	Tour de Wallonie	Belgium	2.HC	Loïc Vliegen (BEL)	Wanty–Gobert	
28 July	Grand Prix de la ville de Pérenchies	France	1.2	Jens Reynders (BEL)	Wallonie–Bruxelles Development Team	
30 July–2 August	Tour de Serbie	Serbia	2.2	Enrico Salvador (ITA)	Northwave Cofiloc	
31 July	Circuito de Getxo	Spain	1.1	Jon Aberasturi (ESP)	Caja Rural–Seguros RGA	
31 July–4 August	Tour Alsace	France	2.2	Tom Pidcock (GBR)	Team Wiggins Le Col	
31 July–11 August	Volta a Portugal	Portugal	2.1	João Rodrigues (POR)	W52 / FC Porto	

=== August ===
Date	Race name	Location	UCI Rating	Winner	Team	Ref
2–5 August	Kreiz Breizh Elites	France	2.2	Mathijs Paasschens (NED)	Wallonie Bruxelles	
3 August	Kalmar Grand Prix	Sweden	1.2	Norman Vahtra (EST)	Klubi Cycling Tartu	
4 August	GP Kranj	Slovenia	1.2	Marko Kump (SVN)	Adria Mobil	
6–10 August	Tour of Szeklerland	Romania	2.2	Jonas Rapp (GER)	Hrinkow Advarics Cycleang	
11 August	Antwerpse Havenpijl	Belgium	1.2	Tibo Nevens (BEL)	Home Solution-Soenens	
11 August	Gran Premio di Poggiana; Trofeo Bonin Costruzioni	Italy	1.2U	Fabio Mazzucco (ITA)	Sangemini–Trevigiani–MG.K Vis	
11 August	Slag om Norg	Netherlands	1.1	Coen Vermeltfoort (NED)	Alecto Cycling Team	
13–17 August	Vuelta a Burgos	Spain	2.HC	Iván Sosa (COL)	Team Ineos	
15 August	Puchar MON	Poland	1.2	Norman Vahtra (EST)	Klubi Cycling Tartu	
15–18 August	Czech Cycling Tour	Czech Republic	2.1	Daryl Impey (RSA)	Mitchelton–Scott	
15–25 August	Tour de l'Avenir	France	2.Ncup	Tobias Foss (NOR)	Norway (national team)	
15–18 August	Arctic Race of Norway	Norway	2.HC	Alexey Lutsenko (KAZ)	Astana	
16 August	Gran Premio Capodarco	Italy	1.2U	Filippo Zana (ITA)	Sangemini–Trevigiani–MG.K Vis	
17 August	Memoriał Henryka Łasaka	Poland	1.2	Norman Vahtra (EST)	Klubi Cycling Tartu	
18 August	Fyen Rundt	Denmark	1.2	Rasmus Quaade (DEN)	Riwal Readynez	
18 August	Polynormande	France	1.1	Benoît Cosnefroy (FRA)	AG2R La Mondiale	
18 August	Coupe des Carpathes	Poland	1.2	John Mandrysch (GER)	P&S Metalltechnik	
20 August	Grote Prijs Stad Zottegem	Belgium	1.1	Piotr Havik (NED)	BEAT Cycling Club	
20 August	Grand Prix des Marbriers	France	1.2	Damien Clayton (GBR)	Ribble Pro Cycling	
21–25 August	Danmark Rundt	Denmark	2.HC	Niklas Larsen (DEN)	Team Waoo	
21–24 August	Tour du Limousin	France	2.1	Benoît Cosnefroy (FRA)	AG2R La Mondiale	
21 August	Veenendaal–Veenendaal Classic	Netherlands	1.1	Zak Dempster (AUS)	Israel Cycling Academy	
25 August	Schaal Sels	Belgium	1.1	Attilio Viviani (ITA)	Cofidis	
27–30 August	Tour Poitou-Charentes en Nouvelle-Aquitaine	France	2.1	Christophe Laporte (FRA)	Cofidis	
28 August	Druivenkoers Overijse	Belgium	1.1	Arvid de Kleijn (NED)	Metec–TKH	
29 August – 1 September	Deutschland Tour	Germany	2.HC	Jasper Stuyven (BEL)	Trek–Segafredo	
31 August	Omloop Mandel-Leie-Schelde	Belgium	1.1	Niccolò Bonifazio (ITA)	Total Direct Énergie	

=== September ===
Date	Race name	Location	UCI Rating	Winner	Team	Ref
1 September	Grand Prix de la ville de Nogent-sur-Oise	France	1.2	Emiel Vermeulen (BEL)	Natura4Ever–Roubaix–Lille Métropole	
1 September	Grote Prijs Jef Scherens	Belgium	1.1	Niccolò Bonifazio (ITA)	Total Direct Énergie	
1 September	Croatia–Slovenia	Slovenia	1.2	Marko Kump (SLO)	Adria Mobil	
4–7 September	Giro del Friuli-Venezia Giulia	Italy	2.2	Clément Champoussin (FRA)	AG2R La Mondiale	
6 September	Hafjell GP	Norway	1.2	Mikkel Bjerg (DEN)	Hagens Berman Axeon	
6 September	Grand Prix Velo Erciyes	Turkey	1.2	Onur Balkan (TUR)	Salcano–Sakarya BB Team	
7 September	Lillehammer GP	Norway	1.2	Niklas Larsen (DEN)	Team Waoo	
7 September	Brussels Cycling Classic	Belgium	1.HC	Caleb Ewan (AUS)	Lotto–Soudal	
7–8 September	Tour of Central Anatolia	Turkey	2.2	Ahmet Örken (TUR)	Salcano–Sakarya BB Team	
7–14 September	Tour of Britain	United Kingdom	2.HC	Mathieu van der Poel (NED)	Corendon–Circus	
8 September	Gylne Gutuer	Norway	1.2	Kristoffer Skjerping (NOR)	Uno-X Norwegian Development Team	
8 September	Antwerp Port Epic	Belgium	1.1	Aimé De Gendt (BEL)	Wanty–Gobert	
8 September	Grand Prix de Fourmies	France	1.HC	Pascal Ackermann (GER)	Bora–Hansgrohe	
8 September	Chrono Champenois	France	1.2	Mikkel Bjerg (DEN)	Hagens Berman Axeon	
11–15 September	Tour of Romania	Romania	2.1	Alex Molenaar (NED)	Monkey Town–à Bloc	
14 September	De Kustpijl	Belgium	1.2	Bas van der Kooij (NED)	Monkey Town–à Bloc	
14 September	Coppa Ugo Agostoni	Italy	1.1	Alexandr Riabushenko (BLR)	UAE Team Emirates	
15 September	Raiffeisen Grand Prix	Austria	1.2	Maciej Paterski (POL)	Wibatech Merx 7R	
15 September	Duo Normand	France	1.1	Rasmus Quaade (DEN); Mathias Norsgaard (DEN)	Riwal Readynez	
15 September	Tour du Doubs	France	1.1	Stefan Küng (SUI)	Groupama–FDJ	
15 September	Coppa Bernocchi	Italy	1.1	Phil Bauhaus (GER)	Bahrain–Merida	
18 September	Grand Prix de Wallonie	Belgium	1.1	Krists Neilands (LVA)	Israel Cycling Academy	
18 September	Giro di Toscana	Italy	1.1	Giovanni Visconti (ITA)	Neri Sottoli–Selle Italia–KTM	
18–21 September	Okolo Slovenska	Slovakia	2.1	Yves Lampaert (BEL)	Deceuninck–Quick-Step	
19 September	Coppa Sabatini	Italy	1.1	Alexey Lutsenko (KAZ)	Astana	
20 September	Kampioenschap van Vlaanderen	Belgium	1.1	Jannik Steimle (GER)	Deceuninck–Quick-Step	
20 September	Grand Prix Erciyes	Turkey	1.2	Nikolai Shumov (BLR)	Minsk Cycling Club	
21 September	Memorial Marco Pantani	Italy	1.1	Alexey Lutsenko (KAZ)	Astana	
21 September	Grand Prix Impanis-Van Petegem	Belgium	1.HC	Edward Theuns (BEL)	Trek–Segafredo	
21–22 September	Tour of Kayseri	Turkey	2.2	Onur Balkan (TUR)	Salcano–Sakarya BB Team	
22 September	Trofeo Matteotti	Italy	1.1	Matteo Trentin (ITA)	Mitchelton–Scott	
22 September	Gooikse Pijl	Belgium	1.1	Pascal Ackermann (GER)	Bora–Hansgrohe	
22 September	Grand Prix d'Isbergues	France	1.1	Mads Pedersen (DEN)	Trek–Segafredo	
24 September	Ruota d'Oro	Italy	1.2U	Nicola Venchiarutti (ITA)	Cycling Team Friuli	
25 September	Omloop van het Houtland	Belgium	1.1	Max Walscheid (GER)	Team Sunweb	
27–29 September	Konya Tour of Mevlana	Turkey	2.2	Batuhan Özgür (TUR)	Team Sapura Cycling	
29 September	Paris–Chauny	France	1.1	Anthony Turgis (FRA)	Total Direct Énergie	

=== October ===
Date	Race name	Location	UCI Rating	Winner	Team	Ref
1–6 October	CRO Race	Croatia	2.1	Adam Yates (GBR)	Mitchelton–Scott	
3 October	Sparkassen Münsterland Giro	Germany	1.HC	Álvaro Hodeg (COL)	Deceuninck–Quick-Step	
5 October	Tour de l'Eurométropole	Belgium	1.HC	Piet Allegaert (BEL)	Sport Vlaanderen–Baloise	
5 October	Giro dell'Emilia	Italy	1.HC	Primož Roglič (SVN)	Team Jumbo–Visma	
6 October	Tour de Vendée	France	1.1	Marc Sarreau (FRA)	Groupama–FDJ	
6 October	Piccolo Giro di Lombardia	Italy	1.2U	Andrea Bagioli (ITA)	Team Colpack	
6 October	Famenne Ardenne Classic	Belgium	1.1	Dimitri Claeys (BEL)	Cofidis	
6 October	Gran Premio Bruno Beghelli	Italy	1.HC	Sonny Colbrelli (ITA)	Bahrain–Merida	
8 October	Binche–Chimay–Binche	Belgium	1.1	Tom Van Asbroeck (BEL)	Israel Cycling Academy	
8 October	Tre Valli Varesine	Italy	1.HC	Primož Roglič (SLO)	Team Jumbo–Visma	
9 October	Milano–Torino	Italy	1.HC	Michael Woods (CAN)	EF Education First	
10 October	Giro del Piemonte	Italy	1.HC	Egan Bernal (COL)	Team Ineos	
10 October	Paris–Bourges	France	1.1	Marc Sarreau (FRA)	Groupama–FDJ	
12 October	Fatih Sultan Mehmet Edirne Race	Turkey	1.2	Onur Balkan (TUR)	Salcano–Sakarya BB Team	
12 October	Tacx Pro Classic	Netherlands	1.1	Dylan Groenewegen (NED)	Team Jumbo–Visma	
13 October	Paris–Tours	France	1.HC	Jelle Wallays (BEL)	Lotto–Soudal	
13 October	Fatih Sultan Mehmet Kirklareli Race	Turkey	1.2	Ahmet Örken (TUR)	Salcano–Sakarya BB Team	
13 October	Memorial Rik Van Steenbergen	Belgium	1.1	Dries De Bondt (BEL)	Corendon–Circus	
13 October	Paris–Tours Espoirs	France	1.2U	Alexys Brunel (FRA)	Équipe Continentale Groupama–FDJ	
20 October	Chrono des Nations Espoirs	France	1.2U	Jasper De Plus (BEL)	Home Solution-Soenens Cycling Team	
20 October	Chrono des Nations	France	1.1	Jos van Emden (NED)	Team Jumbo–Visma	
