= Uladzimir Harakhavik =

Belarusian bicycle racer

Personal information
- Full name: Uladzimir Harakhavik; Belarusian: Уладзімір Гарахавік
- Born: 21 January 1995 (age 31) Minsk, Belarus

Cycling career
- Sport: Cycling
- Current team: Vivarovar
- Discipline: Road
- Role: Rider

Amateur teams
- 2016: RCOP–Belarus
- 2016–2017: Overall
- 2018–2019: CC Villeneuve Saint-Germain
- 2021: Vivarovar
- 2022: Velobakyi Cycling Team
- 2022: Minsk Cycling Club
- 2022–: Vivarovar

Professional teams
- 2015: Minsk
- 2020: Minsk Cycling Club
- 2021: Minsk Cycling Club

Uladzimir Harakhavik (Belarusian: Уладзімір Гарахавік; born 21 January 1995) is a Belarusian cyclist, who currently rides for Belarusian amateur team Vivarovar.

== Major results ==
2014
1st Mountains classification Baltic Chain Tour
2015
1st Sochi Cup
5th Grand Prix Minsk
8th Maykop–Ulyap–Maykop
10th Grand Prix Sarajevo
2016
9th Grand Prix Minsk
2017
9th Grand Prix Minsk
2018
8th Race Horizon Park Maidan
2019
4th Minsk Cup
6th Grand Prix Minsk
9th Entre Brenne et Montmorillonnais
