= Siarhei Papok =

Belarusian racing cyclist

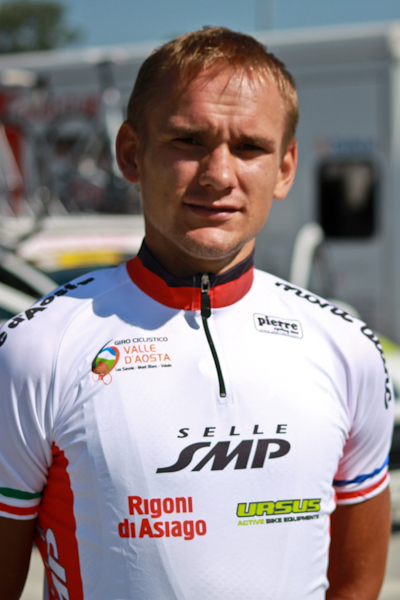
- Papok at the 2011 Giro della Valle d'Aosta.

Personal information
- Full name: Siarhei Papok
- Born: 6 January 1988 (age 38) Minsk, Soviet Union
- Height: 1.77 m (5 ft 10 in)
- Weight: 76 kg (168 lb)

Cycling career
- Sport: Cycling
- Disciplines: Road; Track
- Role: Rider

Amateur teams
- 2007: GS Mastromarco
- 2008: G.S. Seano Vangi
- 2009–2010: San Marco Concrete
- 2011–2012: Hoppla–Trucks Italia–Wega
- 2022: Minsk Cycling Club

Professional teams
- 2014: Rietumu–Delfin
- 2015–2022: Minsk

Siarhei Papok (born 6 January 1988) is a Belarusian road bicycle racer, who most recently rode for Belarusian amateur team Minsk Cycling Club.

== Major results ==
2005
1st Stage 3 Trophée Centre Morbihan
2nd Trofeo Città di Ivrea
3rd Time trial, UCI Junior World Championships
2006
1st Moldova President's Cup
1st Stage 2a Giro della Lunigiana
3rd Overall Cup of Grudziadz Town President
5th Road race, UCI Junior World Championships
2007
1st Moldova President's Cup
2nd Road race, National Under-23 Road Championships
2nd Coppa Città di Asti
2008
National Under-23 Road Championships

1st Road race
1st Time trial

2nd Overall Tour of Sochi
2009
1st Coppa Ciuffenna
1st GP Città di Sona
3rd Riolo Terme
8th ZLM Tour
2010
1st Giro del Belvedere
3rd GP Folignano
4th Overall Giro delle Regioni
5th Trofeo Banca Popolare di Vicenza
5th Trofeo Città di San Vendemiano
9th Overall Giro della Regione Friuli Venezia Giulia
2011
1st La Popolarissima
1st Circuito Silvanese
1st Stage 4 Giro della Valle d'Aosta
1st Stage 5 Giro della Cuneesi
2nd Memorial Glulio Bresci
5th Trofeo Edil C
2012
1st GP Città di Empoli
1st Coppa Ciuffenna
1st Coppa Colli Briantei Internazionale
2nd Road race, National Road Championships
2nd La Bolghera
3rd Pistoia–Fiorano
2013
1st Central European Tour Miskolc GP
Dookoła Mazowsza

1st Points classification
1st Stages 2 & 3

2nd Road race, National Road Championships
3rd Central European Tour Budapest GP
10th Race Horizon Park 2
2014
2nd Time trial, National Road Championships
4th ProRace Berlin
9th Overall Five Rings of Moscow
2015
1st Grand Prix of Moscow
1st Grand Prix Minsk
Five Rings of Moscow

1st Points classification
1st Stage 1

2nd Race Horizon Park Maidan
3rd Moscow Cup
5th Overall Tour of China I

1st Stage 6

7th Overall Tour of China II
2016
1st Grand Prix of Vinnytsia
1st Grand Prix Minsk
1st UAE Cup
Tour of Ukraine

1st Points classification
1st Stages 2b & 3

Sharjah International Cycling Tour

1st Stages 2 & 4

4th Minsk Cup
6th Overall Tour of Estonia
7th Overall Tour of Mersin
9th Belgrade Banjaluka II
2017
1st Stage 2 Tour of Mersin
3rd Overall Tour of China I
4th Grand Prix Minsk
4th Memoriał Henryka Łasaka
9th Tour de Ribas
2018
National Road Championships

2nd Road race
4th Time trial

3rd Overall Tour of Estonia
4th Overall Tour of Mediterrennean
4th Grand Prix Minsk
4th Memoriał Andrzeja Trochanowskiego
10th Memoriał Romana Siemińskiego
2019
1st Stage 9 Tour of Qinghai Lake
2nd Grand Prix Justiniano Hotels
5th Road race, National Road Championships
8th Horizon Park Race Maidan
8th Grand Prix Alanya
9th Odessa Grand Prix
9th Tour de Ribas
2020
7th Grand Prix Gazipaşa
