= Anton Ivashkin =

Belarusian cyclist

Personal information
- Full name: Anton Ivashkin
- Born: 14 April 1996 (age 30) Minsk, Belarus

Cycling career
- Sport: Cycling
- Discipline: Road
- Role: Rider

Professional team
- 2015–2020: Minsk

Anton Ivashkin (born 14 April 1996 in Minsk) is a Belarusian cyclist, who most recently rode for UCI Continental team Minsk Cycling Club.

== Major results ==
2014
1st Stage 2 Coupe du Président de la Ville de Grudziądz
2016
3rd Minsk Cup
8th Grand Prix Minsk
2017
2nd Road race, National Road Championships
3rd Overall Tour de Serbie

1st Young rider classification

10th Minsk Cup
2018
5th Road race, National Road Championships
2019
2nd Road race, National Road Championships
4th Puchar MON
