= Kanstantsin Klimiankou =

Belarusian cyclist

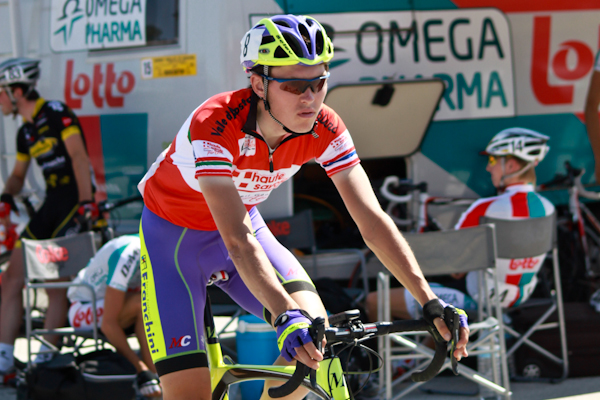

Personal information
- Full name: Kanstantsin Klimiankou
- Born: 3 August 1989 (age 37): Minsk, Byelorussian SSR, Soviet Union; (now Belarus)

Cycling career
- Sport: Cycling
- Discipline: Road
- Role: Rider

Professional teams
- 2012: Continental Team Astana
- 2013: Atlas Personal–Jakroo
- 2014: Amore & Vita–Selle SMP
- 2015–2018: Minsk
- 2019–2021: Ferei Pro Cycling
Medal record
Representing Belarus
Men's road bicycle racing
European Championships
Bronze medal – third place	2011 Offida	Under-23 road race

Kanstantin Klimiankou (born 3 August 1989) is a Belarusian cyclist, who most recently for UCI Continental team Ferei–CCN.

== Major results ==
2009
2nd Puchar Ministra Obrony Narodowej
2010
3rd Road race, National Road Championships
6th Trofeo Internazionale Bastianelli
10th Giro del Belvedere
2011
1st Stage 4 Toscana-Terra di Ciclismo
3rd Road race, UEC European Under-23 Road Championships
3rd Piccolo Giro di Lombardia
10th Trofeo Gianfranco Bianchin
2012
10th Overall La Tropicale Amissa Bongo
2014
6th Coupe des Carpathes
8th Race Horizon Park 1
2015
7th Race Horizon Park Maidan
9th Grand Prix of Vinnytsia
2016
1st Stage 4 Tour de Serbie
6th Overall Tour of Mersin
8th Odessa Grand Prix
2017
4th Overall Tour de Serbie
4th Overall Tour of Bulgaria South
10th Overall Tour of Bulgaria North
2018
8th Horizon Park Race for Peace
2019
5th Tour de Ribas
