= Aleksandr Kuschynski =

Belarusian road racing cyclist

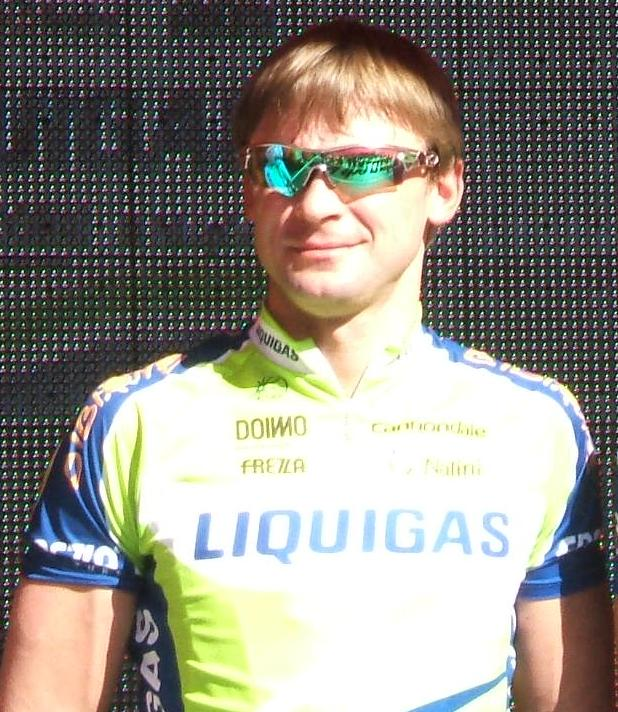

Personal information
- Full name: Aleksandr Kuschynski
- Nickname: Kuchy
- Born: October 27, 1979 (age 46) Orsha, USSR
- Height: 1.82 m (6 ft 0 in)
- Weight: 75 kg (165 lb)

Cycling career
- Sport: Cycling
- Current team: Minsk Cycling Club (men); Minsk Cycling Club (women)
- Discipline: Road
- Role: Rider (retired); Directeur sportif
- Rider type: One-day races

Amateur team
- 2001–2003: Grassi–Mapei

Professional teams
- 2004–2005: Amore & Vita–Beretta
- 2006: Ceramica Flaminia–Bossini Docce
- 2007–2010: Liquigas
- 2011–2014: Team Katusha
- 2015: Minsk

Managerial teams
- 2016: Gazprom–RusVelo
- 2017–: Minsk Cycling Club (men)
- 2020–: Minsk Cycling Club (women)

Aleksandr Kuschynski (born October 27, 1979) is a Belarusian former professional road bicycle racer, who rode professionally between 2004 and 2015 for the Amore & Vita–Beretta, Ceramica Flaminia–Bossini Docce, Liquigas–Doimo, Team Katusha and Minsk teams. Kuschynski was a three-time winner of the Belarusian National Road Race Championships. Kuschynski now works as a directeur sportif for both the men's and women's Minsk Cycling Club teams.

== Major results ==
1997
1st Overall La Coupe du Président de la Ville de Grudziądz
2000
2nd Road race, National Road Championships
5th Gran Premio della Liberazione
2001
3rd Time trial, National Road Championships
8th Gran Premio della Liberazione
9th Giro del Belvedere
2002
3rd Time trial, National Road Championships
2003
1st Gran Premio San Giuseppe
2004
1st Châteauroux Classic
1st Giro d'Abruzzo
2nd Overall Tour of Slovenia

1st Stage 1

4th Tour du Finistère
6th Trofeo Città di Castelfidardo
7th Giro d'Oro
2005
1st Road race, National Road Championships
1st Overall Boucles de la Mayenne
4th Gran Premio Industria e Commercio Artigianato Carnaghese
9th Overall Settimana Ciclistica Lombarda
10th E.O.S. Tallinn GP
2006
1st Memorial Oleg Dyachenko
National Road Championships

2nd Road race
2nd Time trial

2nd Overall Settimana Ciclistica Lombarda
3rd Overall Five Rings of Moscow
3rd Gran Premio di Lugano
6th Grand Prix of Aargau Canton
2007
1st Overall Five Rings of Moscow

1st Stages 1, 2 & 4

2nd Road race, National Road Championships
5th Mayor Cup
7th Tour du Haut Var
10th Memorial Oleg Dyachenko
2008
National Road Championships

2nd Road race
3rd Time trial

5th Omloop Het Volk
2009
2nd Road race, National Road Championships
2nd Gent–Wevelgem
2010
1st Road race, National Road Championships
5th Overall Giro della Provincia di Reggio Calabria
2011
1st Road race, National Road Championships
2012
3rd Road race, National Road Championships
2013
9th Rund um Köln
2014
8th Tour of Almaty
2015
3rd Road race, National Road Championships
Race Horizon Park

3rd Classic
5th Race for Peace

4th Sochi Cup
4th Grand Prix of ISD
5th Krasnodar–Anapa
5th Grand Prix of Vinnytsia
6th Overall Tour of Szeklerland

1st Points classification
1st Stage 1

9th Grand Prix of Sochi Mayor
10th Overall Five Rings of Moscow

=== Grand Tour general classification results timeline ===
Grand Tour	2007	2008	2009	2010	2011	2012	2013
Giro d'Italia	—	—	—	—	90	118	—
Tour de France	89	128	92	86	—	145	141
Vuelta a España	—	—	—	—	143	—	—

Legend
—	Did not compete
DNF	Did not finish
