= Stanislau Bazhkou =

Belarusian cyclist

Personal information
- Full name: Stanislau Alexandrovich Bazhkou; Belarusian: Станіслаў Аляксандравіч Бажкоў
- Born: 4 November 1991 (age 34) Orsha, Belarus

Cycling career
- Sport: Cycling
- Current team: Minsk Cycling Club
- Discipline: Road
- Role: Rider

Amateur team
- 2022–: Minsk Cycling Club

Professional team
- 2015–2022: Minsk

Stanislau Alexandrovich Bazhkou (Belarusian: Станіслаў Аляксандравіч Бажкоў; born 4 November 1991 in Orsha) is a Belarusian cyclist, who currently rides for Belarusian amateur team Minsk Cycling Club.

== Major results ==
2009
1st Overall Coupe du Président de la Ville de Grudziądz
2010
4th Overall Carpathia Couriers Paths
5th ZLM Tour
2011
4th Time trial, National Road Championships
2012
2nd Trofeo Banca Popolare di Vicenza
3rd Time trial, National Road Championships
3rd Giro del Belvedere
3rd GP Capodarco
5th Trofeo Alcide Degasperi
5th Coppa della Pace
7th Gran Premio Palio del Recioto
7th Giro del Medio Brenta
2013
7th Giro del Belvedere
2014
4th Time trial, National Road Championships
2015
1st Mountains classification Tour of Kuban
1st Mountains classification Grand Prix of Adygeya
3rd Overall Tour of China I

1st Mountains classification

4th Odessa Grand Prix I
5th Overall Tour of Szeklerland
7th Maykop–Ulyap–Maykop
8th Odessa Grand Prix II
9th Grand Prix of ISD
2016
1st Mountains classification Tour of China II
3rd Overall Sharjah International Cycling Tour

1st Points classification
1st Stage 3

5th Overall Tour of China I
7th Overall Tour of Ukraine
8th Overall Tour of Szeklerland
8th Overall Tour of Bulgaria

1st Mountains classification

9th Overall Tour of Fuzhou

1st Mountains classification

2017
1st Time trial, National Road Championships
1st Overall Tour of Mersin

1st Points classification
1st Stage 1

La Tropicale Amissa Bongo

1st Points classification
1st Stage 3

1st Stage 3 Tour of Qinghai Lake
2nd Overall Tour of Bulgaria – South

1st Mountains classification

3rd Overall Tour of Fuzhou

1st Mountains classification

3rd GP Adria Mobil
5th Overall Tour of Bulgaria – North
6th Overall Tour of Ankara
6th Overall Tour of Ukraine
7th GP Laguna
2018
1st Road race, National Road Championships
1st Stage 2 Five Rings of Moscow
3rd Overall Tour of Fatih Sultan Mehmet

1st Mountains classification

4th Race Horizon Park Race for Peace
8th Overall Tour of Mersin
2019
2nd Race Horizon Park Classic
3rd Race Horizon Park Maidan
3rd Odessa Grand Prix
3rd Grand Prix Velo Erciyes
6th Tour de Ribas
8th Chabany Race
2021
National Road Championships

1st Road race
2nd Time trial

8th Grand Prix Velo Erciyes
