= Yauheni Hutarovich =

Belarusian road bicycle racer

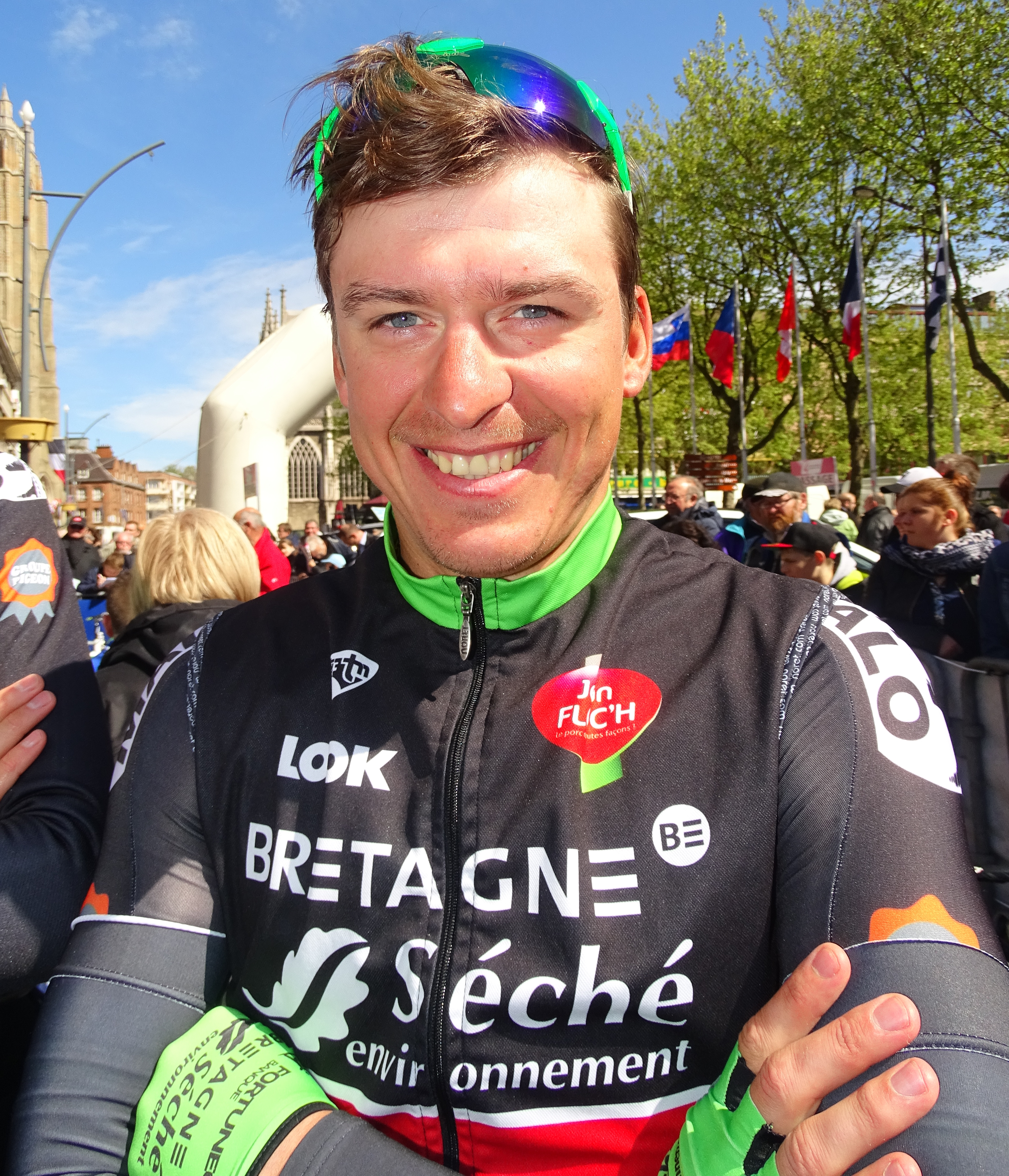
- Hutarovich in 2015

Personal information
- Full name: Yauheni Hutarovich
- Born: 29 November 1983 (age 42) Minsk, Byelorussian SSR, Soviet Union (now Belarus)
- Height: 1.78 m (5 ft 10 in)
- Weight: 78 kg (172 lb)

Cycling career
- Sport: Cycling
- Current team: Minsk Cycling Club
- Discipline: Road
- Role: Rider (retired); Directeur sportif
- Rider type: Sprinter

Professional teams
- 2007: Roubaix–Lille Métropole
- 2008–2012: Française des Jeux
- 2013–2014: Ag2r–La Mondiale
- 2015–2016: Bretagne–Séché Environnement

Managerial team
- 2018–: Minsk Cycling Club

Major wins
- Grand Tours Vuelta a España 1 individual stage (2010) One-day races and Classics National Road Race Championships (2008, 2009, 2012, 2014)

Yauheni Hutarovich (born 29 November 1983) is a Belarusian former road racing cyclist, who competed professionally between 2007 and 2016 for the Roubaix–Lille Métropole, FDJ–BigMat, Ag2r–La Mondiale and Fortuneo–Vital Concept teams. He currently works as a directeur sportif for UCI Continental team Minsk Cycling Club.

== Career ==
In the 2009 Tour de France, Hutarovich was the lanterne rouge, or the last placed overall rider in the general classification (GC). On stage 2 of the 2010 Vuelta a España, Hutarovich surprised everyone as he jumped from the wheel of Mark Cavendish to claim his first Grand Tour stage win, besting other top sprinters such as Tyler Farrar and Alessandro Petacchi.

Hutarovich left FDJ–BigMat at the end of the 2012 season, and joined Ag2r–La Mondiale on a two-year contract from the 2013 season onwards. In September 2014 Bretagne–Séché Environnement announced that they had signed Hutarovich on a one-year deal for 2015. He remained with the team in 2016, before retiring at the end of the season.

== Major results ==
2003
3rd Road race, National Road Championships
2006
Circuit des Ardennes

1st Stages 3 & 4

1st Stage 1a Tour Alsace
3rd Overall Tour de la Manche

1st Stages 1 & 4

5th Road race, National Road Championships
5th Paris–Mantes-en-Yvelines
2007
1st Stage 2 Tour du Poitou-Charentes
2nd Grand Prix de la ville de Pérenchies
3rd Road race, National Road Championships
4th Tour de Vendée
5th Boucles de l'Aulne
2008
1st Road race, National Road Championships
1st Stage 2 Driedaagse van West-Vlaanderen
Vuelta a Burgos

1st Stages 2 & 4

4th Châteauroux Classic
6th Nokere Koerse
10th Tro-Bro Léon
10th Dutch Food Valley Classic
2009
1st Road race, National Road Championships
1st Grand Prix de la Somme
Tour Méditerranéen

1st Stages 1 & 5

1st Stage 6 La Tropicale Amissa Bongo
1st Stage 2 Circuit de Lorraine
3rd Grand Prix de Fourmies
6th Dwars door Vlaanderen
10th Overall Circuit Franco-Belge
10th Paris–Tours
2010
1st Stage 2 Vuelta a España
Tour Méditerranéen

1st Stages 1 & 3

1st Stage 1 Circuit de Lorraine
1st Stage 3 Tour de Pologne
4th Le Samyn
7th Grand Prix de Denain
2011
1st Coppa Bernocchi
1st Nationale Sluitingsprijs
1st Stage 1 Étoile de Bessèges
1st Stage 2 Tour du Poitou-Charentes
2nd Kuurne–Brussels–Kuurne
2nd Ronde Pévéloise
2nd Châteauroux Classic
2nd Paris–Brussels
3rd Scheldeprijs
5th Road race, National Road Championships
5th Le Samyn
5th Nokere Koerse
5th Kampioenschap van Vlaanderen
6th Memorial Rik Van Steenbergen
6th Grand Prix de Fourmies
2012
1st Road race, National Road Championships
Tour de l'Ain

1st Stages 1 & 2a

2nd Kuurne–Brussels–Kuurne
2nd Châteauroux Classic
2013
2nd Classic Loire Atlantique
2nd Route Adélie
3rd Val d'Ille Classic
3rd La Roue Tourangelle
7th Road race, National Road Championships
8th Grand Prix de Fourmies
10th Down Under Classic
2014
1st Road race, National Road Championships
1st Grand Prix de la Somme
Tour de Pologne

1st Points classification
1st Stage 1

2nd La Roue Tourangelle
2nd Grand Prix d'Isbergues
2nd Paris–Bourges
5th Grand Prix de Denain
8th Gent–Wevelgem
8th Tour de Vendée
10th Dwars door Vlaanderen
2015
La Tropicale Amissa Bongo

1st Stages 5, 7 & 8

2nd Arnhem–Veenendaal Classic
2nd Tour de Vendée
3rd Overall World Ports Classic
3rd Scheldeprijs
9th Classica Corsica
9th Kampioenschap van Vlaanderen
10th Road race, National Road Championships
2016
1st Stage 7 La Tropicale Amissa Bongo
2nd Minsk Cup
3rd Grand Prix Minsk
5th Nokere Koerse
5th Arnhem–Veenendaal Classic
7th Road race, National Road Championships

=== Grand Tour general classification results timeline ===
Grand Tour	2008	2009	2010	2011	2012	2013	2014
Giro d'Italia	DNF	—	—	—	—	—	—
Tour de France	—	156	—	—	DNF	—	—
Vuelta a España	—	—	135	—	—	—	134

Legend
—	Did not compete
DNF	Did not finish
