= Oleksandr Golovash =

Ukrainian cyclist (born 1991)

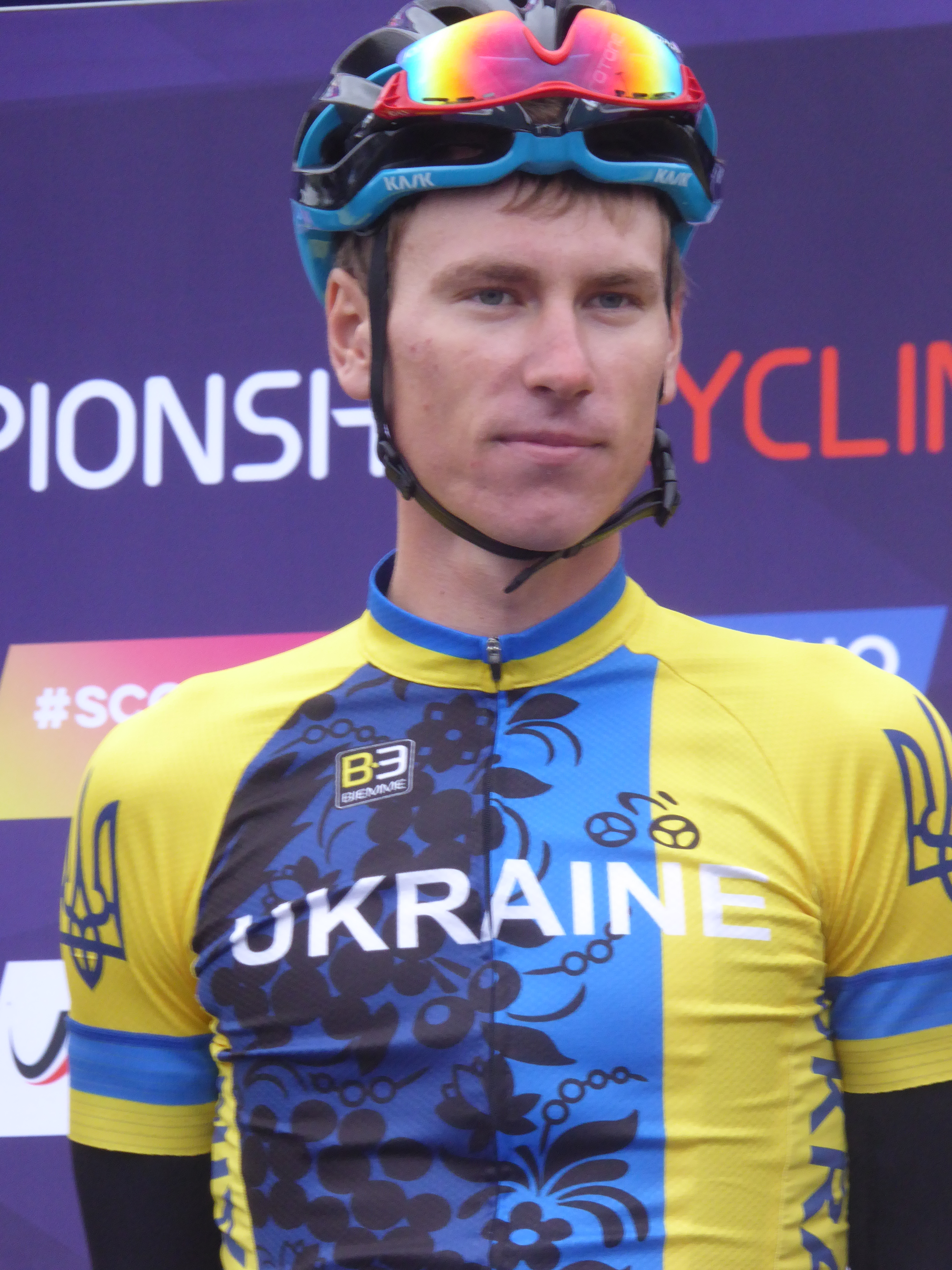
- Golovash at the 2018 European Road Cycling Championships

Personal information
- Full name: Oleksandr Golovash
- Born: 21 September 1991 (age 35) Sumy, Ukraine

Cycling career
- Sport: Cycling
- Current team: Retired
- Discipline: Road
- Role: Rider

Professional teams
- 2013–2016: Kolss Cycling Team
- 2016–2017: Minsk Cycling Club
- 2018: Sharjah Team
- 2019: Kyiv Capital Team
- 2020–2021: Yunnan Lvshan Landscape

Major wins
- One-day races and Classics National Under-23 Road Race Championships (2012) National Under-23 Time Trial Championships (2012)

Oleksandr Golovash (born 21 September 1991) is a Ukrainian former racing cyclist, who competed between 2013 and 2021 for five different teams. During his career, Golovash took two professional victories – stage wins at the 2016 Tour of Taihu Lake and the 2017 La Tropicale Amissa Bongo.

== Major results ==
2012
National Under-23 Road Championships

1st Road race
1st Time trial

3rd Time trial, UEC European Under-23 Road Championships
2013
1st Time trial, National Under-23 Road Championships
2nd Time trial, UEC European Under-23 Road Championships
2014
1st Stage 1 Tour of Szeklerland
2015
1st Minsk Cup
1st Stage 3b Tour of Szeklerland
6th Overall Tour of China II
2016
1st Prologue Tour of Taihu Lake
3rd Odessa Grand Prix
4th Tour de Ribas
6th Overall Sharjah International Cycling Tour
9th Overall Tour of Ukraine

1st Stage 2a (TTT)

10th Overall Tour of Szeklerland
2017
1st Stage 6 La Tropicale Amissa Bongo
5th Overall Tour of Ukraine
6th Tour de Ribas
7th Minsk Cup
10th Odessa Grand Prix
2018
1st Stage 2 Tour International de la Wilaya d'Oran
3rd Time trial, National Road Championships
4th Race Horizon Park Maidan
2019
1st Tour of Poyang Lake
3rd Time trial, National Road Championships
3rd Chabany Race
4th Tour de Ribas
6th Odessa Grand Prix
9th Overall Tour of Małopolska

1st Stage 2
