= Belarusian National Road Race Championships =

National road cycling championship in Belarus

The champion's jersey

The Belarusian National Road Race Championships is a cycling race where the Belarusian cyclists decide who will become the champion for the year to come.

== Multiple winners ==
Men

Wins	Name	Years
7	Yauhen Sobal	2001, 2003, 2004, 2019, 2020, 2023, 2024
4	Yauheni Hutarovich	2008, 2009, 2012, 2014
3	Aleksandr Kuschynski	2005, 2010, 2011
2	Kanstantsin Sivtsov	2006, 2016
2	Andrei Krasilnikau	2013, 2015
2	Stanislau Bazhkou	2018, 2021

Women

Wins	Name	Years
10	Tatsiana Sharakova	2005, 2007, 2008, 2009, 2012, 2016, 2017, 2019, 2020, 2021
5	Alena Amialiusik	2011, 2013, 2014, 2015, 2018
3	Tatsiana Makeyeva	1999, 2000, 2001
3	Volha Hayeva	2002, 2003, 2004

== Men ==
=== Elite ===
Belarusian National Road Race Championships – Men's elite race
Race details
- Region: Belarus
- Discipline: Road bicycle racing
- Type: One-day

History
- First edition: 1926
- First winner: Viatcheslav Guerman
- Most wins: Yauhen Sobal (7 wins)
- Most recent: Yauhen Sobal

Year	Gold	Silver	Bronze
1996	Viatcheslav Guerman	Oleg Bondarik	Pavel Kavetzky
1997	Sergej Borodoulin	Alexander Charapov	Andrej Borodoulin
1998	Alexander Charapov	Alexandre Usov	Alexander Kozlov
1999	Yauheni Seniushkin	Evgeni Golovanov	Sergei Borodoulin
2000	Alexandre Kozlov	Aleksandr Kuschynski	Dimitri Aulasenko
2001	Yauhen Sobal	Aleksei Levdanski	Alexandre Kozlov
2002	Alexandre Usov	Alexandre Kozlov	Kanstantsin Sivtsov
2003	Yauhen Sobal	Kanstantsin Sivtsov	Yauheni Hutarovich
2004	Yauhen Sobal	Uladzimir Autka	Vasil Kiryenka
2005	Aleksandr Kuschynski	Anatole Chaburka	Vladimir Autko
2006	Kanstantsin Sivtsov	Aleksandr Kuschynski	Anatole Chaburka
2007	Branislau Samoilau	Aleksandr Kuschynski	Yauheni Hutarovich
2008	Yauheni Hutarovich	Aleksandr Kuschynski	Alexandre Usov
2009	Yauheni Hutarovich	Aleksandr Kuschynski	Aliaksandr Sinelnikau
2010	Aleksandr Kuschynski	Yauhen Sobal	Kanstantsin Klimiankou
2011	Aleksandr Kuschynski	Kanstantsin Sivtsov	Branislau Samoilau
2012	Yauheni Hutarovich	Siarhei Papok	Aleksandr Kuschynski
2013	Andrei Krasilnikau	Siarhei Papok	Ihar Mytsko
2014	Yauheni Hutarovich	Kolya Shumov	Nikita Zharoven
2015	Andrei Krasilnikau	Dzmitry Zhyhunou	Aleksandr Kuschynski
2016	Kanstantsin Sivtsov	Nikolai Shumov	Branislau Samoilau
2017	Nikolai Shumov	Anton Ivashkin	Aleksandr Riabushenko
2018	Stanislau Bazhkou	Siarhei Papok	Branislau Samoilau
2019	Yauhen Sobal	Anton Ivashkin	Vasili Strokau
2020	Yauhen Sobal	Aleksandr Riabushenko	Yauheni Karaliok
2021	Stanislau Bazhkou	Mark Grinkevich	Yauhen Sobal
2022	Aliaksandr Piasetski	Yauheni Karaliok	Yauhen Sobal
2023	Yauhen Sobal	Yauheni Karaliok	Ilya Baydikov
2024	Yauhen Sobal	Nikita Shulchenko	Vasili Strokau

=== U23 ===
Year	Gold	Silver	Bronze
2005	Sergei Dovbniuk	Andrei Kunitski	Yauheni Hutarovich
2007	Sergey Sakavets	Sergey Popok	Aliaksandr Sinelnikov
2008	Siarhei Papok	Maxim Kumilevski	Sergey Sakavets
2011	Siarhei Novikau		
2014	Nikolai Shumov	Nikita Zharoven	Aleh Ahiyevich
2015	Dzmitry Zhyhunou	Aleksandr Riabushenko	Nikolai Shumov
2016	Nikolai Shumov	Aleksandr Riabushenko	Vasili Strokau
2017	Anton Ivashkin	Aleksandr Riabushenko	Vasili Strokau
2018	Anton Ivashkin	Ilya Volkau	Yauheni Karaliok
2019	Yahor Shpakouski	Dzianis Marchuk	Siarhei Shauchenka
2020	Siarhei Shauchenka	Kanstantsin Bialiauski	Artsiom Harbach
2021	Mark Grinkevich	Dzianis Marchuk	Pavel Turchanka
2022	Dzianis Marchuk	Artur Kiryievich	Aliaksandr Sychuhou

== Women ==
Belarusian National Road Race Championships – Women's elite race
Race details
- Region: Belarus
- Discipline: Road bicycle racing
- Type: One-day

History
- First edition: 1999
- First winner: Tatsiana Makeyeva
- Most wins: Tatsiana Sharakova (10 wins)
- Most recent: Hanna Tserakh

Year	Gold	Silver	Bronze
1999	Tatsiana Makeyeva	Veronika Sheremetieva	Oksana Zviagintseva
2000	Tatsiana Makeyeva	Volha Koushniarevich	Valiantsina Vaulchok
2001	Tatsiana Makeyeva	Volha Hayeva	Volha Kushnerevitch
2002	Volha Hayeva	Veronika Sheremetieva	Yulia Cherepan
2003	Volha Hayeva	Tatsiana Sharakova	Tatiana Makeyeva
2004	Volha Hayeva	Tatsiana Sharakova	Mariya Halan
2005	Tatsiana Sharakova	Ialena Hetsman	Veranika Vyrastka
2006	Ialena Hetsman	Veronika Sharametsyeva	Hanna Subota
2007	Tatsiana Sharakova	Aksana Papko	Alena Amialiusik
2008	Tatsiana Sharakova	Zinaida Stahurskaya	Iryna Asavets
2009	Tatsiana Sharakova	Zinaida Stahurskaya	Elena Azarkevich
2010	Aksana Papko	Alena Amialiusik	Iryna Kryuchkova
2011	Alena Amialiusik	Tatsiana Sharakova	Alena Sitsko
2012	Tatsiana Sharakova	Svetlana Stahurskaia	Alena Amialiusik
2013	Alena Amialiusik	Marina Shmayankova	Ksenyia Tuhai
2014	Alena Amialiusik	Alena Sitsko	Ksenyia Tuhai
2015	Alena Amialiusik	Tatsiana Sharakova	Ina Savenka
2016	Tatsiana Sharakova	Ksenyia Tuhai	Palina Pivavarava
2017	Tatsiana Sharakova	Hanna Tserakh	Ina Savenka
2018	Alena Amialiusik	Taisa Naskovich	Hanna Tserakh
2019	Tatsiana Sharakova	Hanna Tserakh	Alena Amialiusik
2020	Tatsiana Sharakova	Maryna Zueva	Palina Pivavarava
2021	Tatsiana Sharakova	Hanna Tserakh	Alina Abramenko
2022	Hanna Tserakh	Nastassia Kiptsikava	Taisa Naskovich
2023	Hanna Tserakh	Karalina Savenka	Taisa Naskovich

== See also ==
- Belarusian National Time Trial Championships
- National road cycling championships
