= Nikolai Shumov =

Russian-born Belarusian cyclist

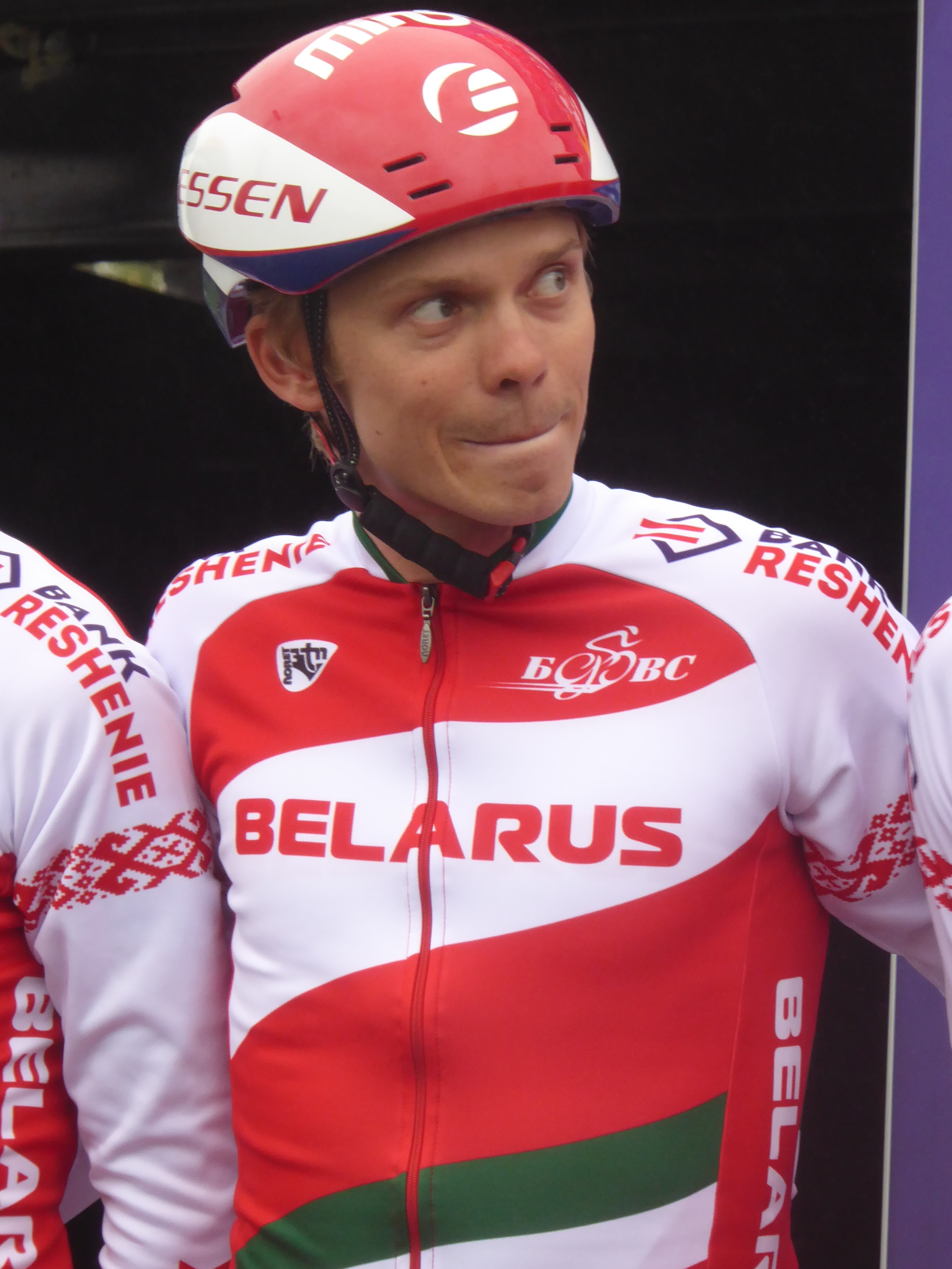
- Shumov at the 2018 European Road Cycling Championships

Personal information
- Full name: Nikolai Shumov
- Born: 16 February 1994 (age 32) Moscow, Russia

Cycling career
- Sport: Cycling
- Discipline: Road
- Role: Rider

Amateur teams
- 2013: AC Bisontine
- 2014–2016: General Store Bottoli Zardini
- 2017: Delio Gallina Colosio Eurofeed
- 2021: Vivarovar

Professional teams
- 2018–2020: Minsk Cycling Club
- 2021: Minsk Cycling Club

Nikolai Shumov (born 16 February 1994) is a Russian-born Belarusian former cyclist, who competed for UCI Continental team Minsk Cycling Club between 2018 and 2021. He took one professional victory during his career, when he won the 2017 Belarusian National Road Race Championships.

In 2018 Shumov was involved in a suspected race-fixing incident in the Grand Prix of Minsk.

== Major results ==
2011
4th Overall Giro di Basilicata

1st Stage 2

2014
National Road Championships

1st Under-23 road race
2nd Road race

2015
3rd Road race, National Under-23 Road Championships
4th Overall Tour de Serbie

1st Young rider classification

4th Grand Prix Sarajevo
6th Gran Premio della Liberazione
2016
National Road Championships

1st Under-23 road race
2nd Road race

8th Puchar Ministra Obrony Narodowej
2017
1st Road race, National Road Championships
1st Trofeo Città di Brescia
2018
1st Grand Prix Minsk
1st Stage 3 Tour of Cartier
5th Minsk Cup
6th Grand Prix Side
2019
1st Grand Prix Velo Alanya
1st Stage 1 Five Rings of Moscow
4th Grand Prix Minsk
6th Horizon Park Race Classic
6th Memoriał Henryka Łasaka
10th Grand Prix Justiniano Hotels
