= Norman Vahtra =

Estonian cyclist (born 1996)

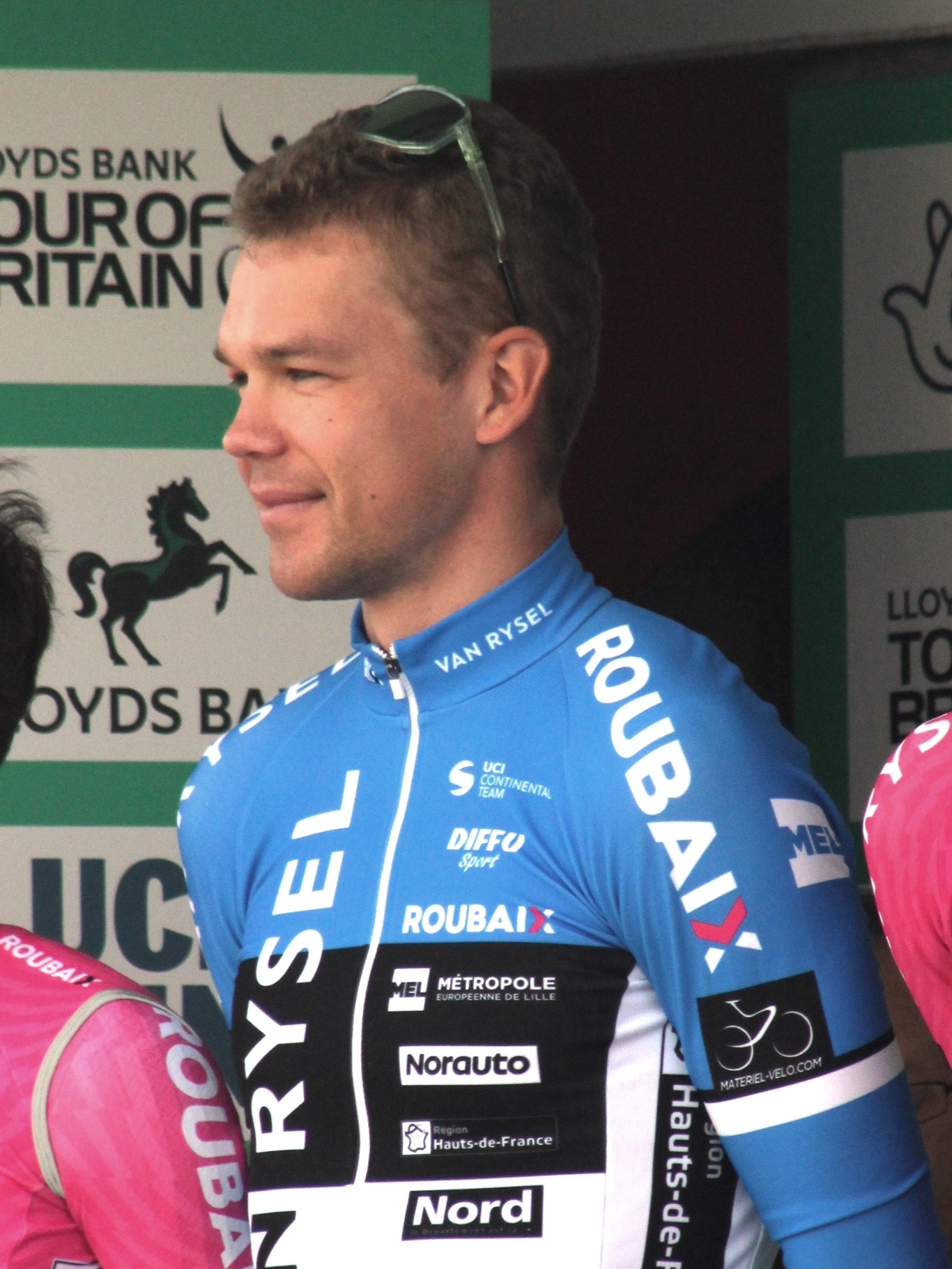
- Vahtra wearing the Estonian jersey in 2024

Personal information
- Born: 23 November 1996 (age 29) Tartu, Estonia
- Height: 1.92 m (6 ft 4 in)
- Weight: 83 kg (183 lb)

Cycling career
- Sport: Cycling
- Current team: China Anta–Mentech Cycling Team
- Discipline: Road
- Role: Rider

Amateur teams
- 2016–2017: CC Villeneuve Saint-Germain
- 2017: AGO–Aqua Service (stagiaire)
- 2018–2019: Klubi Cycling Tartu

Professional teams
- 2020–2021: Israel Start-Up Nation
- 2022–2024: Go Sport–Roubaix–Lille Métropole
- 2025–: China Anta–Mentech Cycling Team

Major wins
- Single-day races and Classics National Road Race Championships (2020, 2024)

Norman Vahtra (born 23 November 1996) is an Estonian cyclist, who currently rides for UCI Continental team China Anta–Mentech Cycling Team. He competed in the road race at the 2018 UCI Road World Championships. In 2019, Vahtra won 8 UCI races for Cycling Tartu, an under-23 development team led by ex-pro Rene Mandri.

== Major results ==
2014
2nd Time trial, National Junior Road Championships
2016
7th Grand Prix Minsk
2017
2nd Grand Prix Minsk
2nd Time trial, National Under-23 Road Championships
3rd Time trial, National Road Championships
9th Overall Tour of Estonia
2018
National Under-23 Road Championships

1st Time trial
2nd Road race

3rd Minsk Cup
National Road Championships

3rd Time trial
4th Road race

7th Overall Tour of Mediterrennean
8th Kalmar Grand Prix
9th Overall Baltic Chain Tour

1st Young rider classification

2019
1st Overall Course de Solidarność et des Champions Olympiques

1st Points classification
1st Stages 2, 3 & 5

1st Grand Prix Minsk
1st Kalmar Grand Prix
1st Puchar Ministra Obrony Narodowej
1st Memoriał Henryka Łasaka
7th Grand Prix Velo Alanya
7th Overall Dookoła Mazowsza
8th Overall Tour of Xingtai
2020 (1 pro win)
1st Road race, National Road Championships
2021
2nd Time trial, National Road Championships
6th Overall Tour of Estonia
2022 (1)
2nd Overall Tour of Estonia

1st Stage 2

3rd Time trial, National Road Championships
2023
2nd Grand Prix de la Ville de Lillers
2nd SD WORX BW Classic
3rd Time trial, National Road Championships
3rd Overall Tour of Estonia
9th Grand Prix de la ville de Pérenchies
2024 (2)
National Road Championships

1st Road race
2nd Time trial

1st Stage 1 Tour of Estonia
