= Yauhen Sobal =

Belarusian cyclist

Personal information
- Full name: Yauhen Sobal
- Born: 7 April 1981 (age 45)

Cycling career
- Sport: Cycling
- Current team: Minsk Cycling Club
- Discipline: Road
- Role: Rider

Amateur team
- 2005: Centro Convenienza Esse

Professional teams
- 2004: Grupa PSB
- 2007: Cinelli–OPD–Endeka
- 2008: Tinkoff Credit Systems
- 2009: Centri della Calzatura
- 2010: Partizan Srbija
- 2016–2023: Minsk Cycling Club
- 2024–: Chengdu Cycling Team

Yauhen Sobal (born 7 April 1981) is a Belarusian cyclist, who currently rides for UCI Continental team Minsk Cycling Club. He competed in the points race at the 2004 Summer Olympics.

== Major results ==
2001
1st Road race, National Road Championships
2003
National Road Championships

1st Road race
1st Time trial

2004
National Road Championships

1st

Tour of Turkey

1st Stages 1 & 2

2005
2nd Les Boucles du Sud Ardèche
10th GP Capodarco
2006
1st Stage 1 Giro della Valle d'Aosta
2007
6th Giro dell'Appennino
6th Coppa Agostoni
9th GP Nobili Rubinetterie
9th Overall Giro del Trentino
2008
1st Stage 1 Settimana Ciclistica Lombarda
5th Overall Tour de Langkawi
2009
1st Stage 2 Tour de Serbie
3rd GP Kranj
2010
2nd Road race, National Road Championships
7th Overall Tour de Serbie
10th Overall Five Rings of Moscow
2016
1st Overall Course de la Solidarité Olympique

1st Stage 5

6th Overall Tour of Ukraine
10th Tour de Ribas
2017
3rd Time trial, National Road Championships
3rd Minsk Cup
8th Overall Tour of Quanzhou Bay
10th Horizon Park Race for Peace
2018
2nd Overall Tour de Serbie
7th Grand Prix Side
7th Grand Prix Alanya
2019
National Road Championships

1st Road race
1st Time trial

1st Overall Five Rings of Moscow
1st Horizon Park Race for Peace
3rd Overall Tour of China I
2020
National Road Championships

1st Road race
4th Time trial

2021
10th Grand Prix Alanya

2023
National Road Championships

1st

2024
National Road Championships

1st
