= Moldova President's Cup =

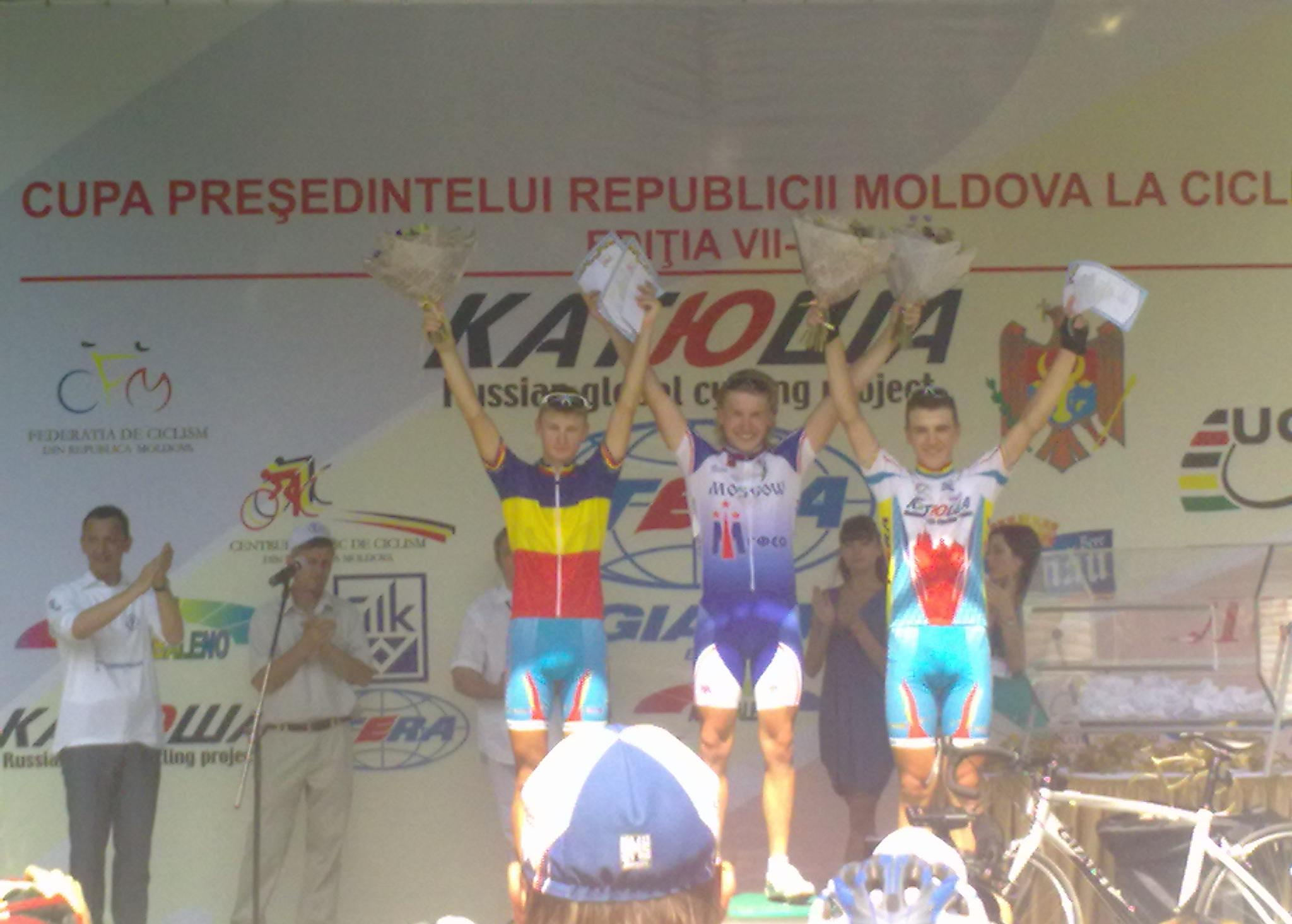

Race details
- Date: June
- Region: Chişinău, Moldova
- English name: Moldova President's Cup
- Local name(s): Cupa Preşedintelui la ciclism (in Romanian)
- Discipline: Road race
- Type: Criterium
- Organiser: Moldavian Cycling Federation

History
- First edition: 2003
- Editions: 7
- Final edition: 2010
- First winner: Unknown
- Most wins: Alexandru Mocan (MDA)
- Final winner: Kiril Yatsevich (RUS)

Moldova President's Cup was an international road bicycle racing tournament in Chişinău (Moldova), that was existed between 2003 and 2010.

== Winners ==
Year	Winner	Second	Third
2004	(Moldova) Victor Mironov	(Moldova) Sergiu Cioban	
2005	(Moldova) Alexandru Mocan		
2006	(Belarus) Siarhei Papok	(Lithuania) Egidius Iodvaldis	(Ukraine) Artiom Zaitev
2007	(Moldova) Alexandru Mocan	(Ukraine) Artiom Zaitev	(Ukraine) Igor Krot
2008	(Belarus) Artur Malinovsky	(Spain) Eric Pederosa Romal	(Belarus) Artur Surganov
2009	(Belarus) Yauheni Patenka	(Poland) Pavel Petrovici	(Ukraine) Nazar Perebinos
2010	(Russia) Kiril Yatsevich	(Moldova) Eugeniu Cozonac	(Moldova) Dumitru Pruteanu
