= Belarusian National Time Trial Championships =

National road cycling championship in Belarus

The champion's jersey

The Belarusian National Time Trial Championships is a cycling race where the Belarusian cyclists decide who will become the champion for the year to come.

== Multiple winners ==
Riders that won the race more than once.

Men

Wins	Rider	Years
5	Kanstantsin Sivtsov	2004, 2011, 2013, 2014, 2016
5	Vasil Kiryienka	2002, 2005, 2006, 2015, 2018
5	Yauheni Karaliok	2020, 2021, 2022, 2023, 2024
3	Viktor Rapinski	1999, 2000, 2001
3	Branislau Samoilau	2009, 2010, 2012
2	Alexandre Choupikov	1997, 1998
2	Yauhen Sobal	2003, 2019
2	Andrei Kunitski	2007, 2008

Women

Wins	Name	Years
9	Tatsiana Sharakova	2005, 2007, 2008, 2009, 2016, 2017, 2019, 2020, 2021
6	Alena Amialiusik	2011, 2012, 2013, 2014, 2015, 2018
3	Tatsiana Makeyeva	1999, 2000, 2001

== Men ==
=== Elite ===
Belarusian National Time Trial Championships – Men's elite
Race details
- Region: Belarus
- Discipline: Road bicycle racing
- Type: One-day

History
- First edition: 1997
- First winner: Alexandre Choupikov
- Most wins: Kanstantsin Sivtsov; Vasil Kiryienka; Yauheni Karaliok; (5 wins)
- Most recent: Yauheni Karaliok

Year	Gold	Silver	Bronze
1997	Alexandre Choupikov	Pavel Kavetzky	Yauheni Seniushkin
1998	Alexandre Choupikov	Igor Grimkov	Alexander Kozlov
1999	Viktor Rapinski	Andrej Voinau	Vasil Kiryienka
2000	Viktor Rapinski	Vasil Kiryienka	Dimitri Aulasenko
2001	Viktor Rapinski	Vasil Kiryienka	Aleksandr Kuschynski
2002	Vasil Kiryienka	Kanstantsin Sivtsov	Aleksandr Kuschynski
2003	Yauhen Sobal	Dzmitry Aulasenka	Kanstantsin Sivtsov
2004	Kanstantsin Sivtsov	Vasil Kiryienka	Yauhen Sobal
2005	Vasil Kiryienka	Viktor Rapinski	Vladimir Autko
2006	Vasil Kiryienka	Aleksandr Kuschynski	Anatole Chaburka
2007	Andrei Kunitski	Branislau Samoilau	Vasil Kiryienka
2008	Andrei Kunitski	Vasil Kiryienka	Aleksandr Kuschynski
2009	Branislau Samoilau	Andrei Krasilnikau	Siarhei Novikau
2010	Branislau Samoilau	Andrei Krasilnikau	Siarhei Novikau
2011	Kanstantsin Sivtsov	Ilia Koshevoy	Andrei Holubeu
2012	Branislau Samoilau	Andrei Krasilnikau	Stanislau Bazhkou
2013	Kanstantsin Sivtsov	Andrei Krasilnikau	Branislau Samoilau
2014	Kanstantsin Sivtsov	Siarhei Papok	Branislau Samoilau
2015	Vasil Kiryienka	Branislau Samoilau	Aleh Ahiyevich
2016	Kanstantsin Sivtsov	Branislau Samoilau	Aleh Ahiyevich
2017	Stanislau Bazhkou	Anton Muzychkin	Yauhen Sobal
2018	Vasil Kiryienka	Branislau Samoilau	Kanstantsin Sivtsov
2019	Yauhen Sobal	Branislau Samoilau	Yauheni Karaliok
2020	Yauheni Karaliok	Branislau Samoilau	Mikhail Shemetau
2021	Yauheni Karaliok	Stanislau Bazhkou	Yauhen Sobal
2022	Yauheni Karaliok	Raman Ramanau	Stanislau Bazhkou
2023	Yauheni Karaliok	Dzianis Mazur	Raman Ramanau
2024	Yauheni Karaliok	Mark Grinkevich	Yahor Shpakouski

=== U23 ===
Year	Gold	Silver	Bronze
2005	Branislau Samoilau	Andrei Kunitski	Aliaksandr Lisouski
2006	Aliaksei Polushkin	Bronislau Samoilau	Andrei Kunitski
2007	Siarhei Papok	Igor Govor	Dmitri Azarkevich
2008	Siarhei Papok	Andrei Krasilnikau	Konstantin Shvedov
2014	Raman Tsishkou	Andrei Sakalou	Aleksandr Riabushenko
2015	Aleh Ahiyevich	Raman Tsishkou	Anton Muzychkin
2017	Yauheni Karaliok	Yauheni Akhramenka	Hardzei Tsishchanka
2018	Alexei Piashkun	Kanstantsin Bialiauski	Ilya Volkau
2019	Ilya Volkau	Siarhei Shauchenka	Yahor Shpakovski
2020	Dzianis Mazur	Siarhei Shauchenka	Kanstantsin Bialiauski
2021	Dzianis Mazur	Mark Grinkevich	Tsikhan Shchamialiou
2022	Mark Grinkevich	Kiryl Kavaliou	Aliaksandr Sychuhou

== Women ==
Belarusian National Time Trial Championships – Women's elite
Race details
- Region: Belarus
- Discipline: Road bicycle racing
- Type: One-day

History
- First edition: 1999
- First winner: Tatsiana Makeyeva
- Most wins: Tatsiana Sharakova (9 wins)
- Most recent: Hanna Tserakh

Year	Gold	Silver	Bronze
1999	Tatsiana Makeyeva	Svetlana Sytchova	Veronika Sheremetieva
2000	Tatsiana Makeyeva	Alena Hetsman	Valiantsina Vaulchok
2001	Tatsiana Makeyeva	Volha Kushnerevitch	Elena Hezman
2003	Ialena Hetsman		
2004	Mariya Halan		
2005	Tatsiana Sharakova	Ialena Hetsman	
2006	Alena Sitsko	Alesya Belaichuk	
2007	Tatsiana Sharakova	Elena Dylko	Alena Amialiusik
2008	Tatsiana Sharakova	Aksana Papko	Hanna Talkanitsa
2009	Tatsiana Sharakova	Anna Tolkanitsa	Zinaida Stahurskaya
2010	Aksana Papko	Alena Sitsko	Tatiana Panina
2011	Alena Amialiusik	Tatsiana Sharakova	Aksana Papko
2012	Alena Amialiusik	Elena Dylko	Alena Sitsko
2013	Alena Amialiusik	Alena Sitsko	Volha Masiukovich
2014	Alena Amialiusik	Alena Sitsko	Svetlana Stahurskaia
2015	Alena Amialiusik	Tatsiana Sharakova	Elena Dylko
2016	Tatsiana Sharakova	Alena Amialiusik	Katsiaryna Piatrouskaya
2017	Tatsiana Sharakova	Ina Savenka	Palina Pivovarova
2018	Alena Amialiusik	Ina Savenka	Katsiaryna Piatrouskaya
2019	Tatsiana Sharakova	Alena Amialiusik	Anastasia Kolesova
2020	Tatsiana Sharakova	Ina Savenka	Palina Pivovarova
2021	Tatsiana Sharakova	Hanna Tserakh	Nastassia Kiptsikava
2022	Hanna Tserakh	Nastassia Kiptsikava	Taisa Naskovich
2023	Hanna Tserakh	Karalina Savenka	Nastassia Kiptsikava

== See also ==
- Belarusian National Road Race Championships
- National road cycling championships
