= 2019 Coppa Ugo Agostoni =

2019 UCI Europe Tour

Race details
- Dates: 14 September 2019
- Stages: 1
- Distance: 199.9 km (124.2 mi)
- Winning time: 4h 46' 18"

Results
	Winner	Alexandr Riabushenko (BLR)	(UAE Team Emirates)
	Second	Alexey Lutsenko (KAZ)	(Astana)
	Third	Nikolay Cherkasov (RUS)	(Gazprom–RusVelo)

The 2019 Coppa Ugo Agostoni was the 73rd edition of the Coppa Ugo Agostoni road cycling one day race. It was held on 14 September 2019 as part of the UCI Europe Tour as a 1.1-ranked event.

== Teams ==
Twenty-five teams, which consisted of three UCI WorldTour teams, thirteen UCI Professional Continental teams, eight UCI Continental teams, and one national team, participated in the race. Each team could enter up to seven riders; however, Bahrain–Merida, Meridiana–Kamen, UAE Team Emirates, Wanty–Gobert entered only six riders, and Giotti Victoria–Palomar entered only five. Of the 175 riders that started the race, only 57 riders finished.

UCI WorldTeams

- Astana
- Bahrain–Merida
- UAE Team Emirates

UCI Professional Continental Teams

- Androni Giocattoli–Sidermec
- Arkéa–Samsic
- Bardiani–CSF
- Caja Rural–Seguros RGA
- Delko–Marseille Provence
- Euskadi–Murias
- Gazprom–RusVelo
- Israel Cycling Academy
- Neri Sottoli–Selle Italia–KTM
- Nippo–Vini Fantini–Faizanè
- Total Direct Énergie
- Vital Concept–B&B Hotels
- Wanty–Gobert

UCI Continental Teams

- Biesse–Carrera
- D'Amico–UM Tools
- Dimension Data for Qhubeka
- Giotti Victoria–Palomar
- Meridiana–Kamen
- Sangemini–MG.K Vis
- Team Beltrami TSA–Hopplà–Petroli Firenze
- Team Colpack

National Teams

- Italy

== Result ==
Result
Rank	Rider	Team	Time
1	Alexandr Riabushenko (BLR)	UAE Team Emirates	4h 46' 18"
2	Alexey Lutsenko (KAZ)	Astana	+ 0"
3	Nikolay Cherkasov (RUS)	Gazprom–RusVelo	+ 31"
4	Lorenzo Rota (ITA)	Bardiani–CSF	+ 1' 20"
5	Giovanni Visconti (ITA)	Neri Sottoli–Selle Italia–KTM	+ 1' 20"
6	Warren Barguil (FRA)	Arkéa–Samsic	+ 1' 20"
7	Giulio Ciccone (ITA)	Italy	+ 1' 20"
8	Fausto Masnada (ITA)	Androni Giocattoli–Sidermec	+ 1' 20"
9	Alexander Vlasov (RUS)	Gazprom–RusVelo	+ 1' 20"
10	Andrea Garosio (ITA)	Bahrain–Merida	+ 1' 20"
