= Yauheni Seniushkin =

Belarusian cyclist

Personal information
- Born: 18 April 1977 (age 49) Mazyr, Belarus

Cycling career
- Sport: Cycling
- Discipline: Road
- Role: Rider

Amateur team
- 1998–1999: Casini–Vellutex

Professional teams
- 2000–2002: Ceramica Panaria–Gaerne
- 2003: Health Net–Maxxis

Yauheni Seniushkin (born 18 April 1977, in Mazyr) is a Belarusian former road cyclist. A professional from 2000 to 2003, he notably won the Trofeo Matteotti in 2000 and the Belarusian National Road Race Championships in 1999. He also rode in the 2000 Giro d'Italia, 2002 Giro d'Italia and the 2001 Vuelta a España.

== Major results ==
1997
3rd Time trial, National Road Championships
1998
1st Florence-Empoli
1999
1st Road race, National Road Championships
1st Giro del Canavese
1st Stage 1 Giro della Toscana Under-23
2000
1st Trofeo Matteotti
2001
2nd Giro del Lago Maggiore
