= Vasili Strokau =

Belarusian bicycle racer

Personal information
- Full name: Vasili Strokau
- Born: 9 October 1995 (age 31) Minsk, Belarus

Cycling career
- Sport: Cycling
- Current team: Minsk Cycling Club
- Discipline: Road
- Role: Rider

Professional team
- 2017–: Minsk Cycling Club

Vasili Strokau (born 9 October 1995 in Minsk) is a Belarusian cyclist, who currently rides for UCI Continental team Minsk Cycling Club.

== Major results ==
2013
7th Overall La Coupe du Président de la Ville de Grudziądz

1st Stage 3

2015
7th Memoriał Henryka Łasaka
2016
6th Grand Prix of ISD
9th Horizon Park Classic
2017
1st Stage 5 Tour de l'Avenir
9th Overall Dookoła Mazowsza
2018
1st Stage 3 Five Rings of Moscow
2019
1st Stage 2 Tour of Xingtai
2022
10th Grand Prix Alanya
