= Branislau Samoilau =

Belarusian road bicycle racer

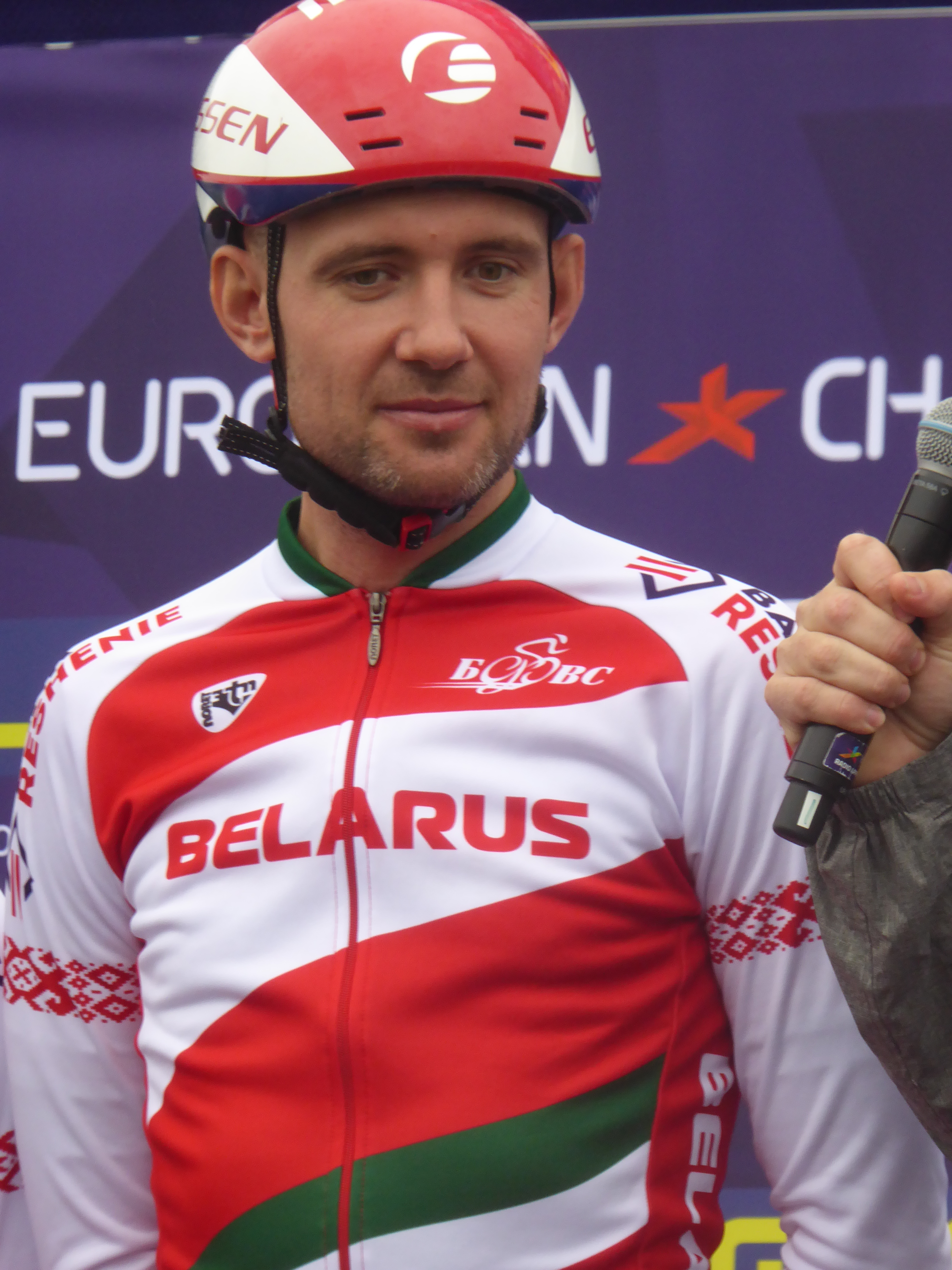
- Samoilau at the 2018 European Road Cycling Championships

Personal information
- Full name: Branislau Samoilau; Belarusian: Браніслаў Самойлаў
- Born: 25 May 1985 (age 41): Vitebsk, Belorussian SSR, Soviet Union; (now Belarus)

Cycling career
- Sport: Cycling
- Current team: Retired
- Discipline: Road
- Role: Rider
- Rider type: Time-trialist

Amateur teams
- 2004–2006: Palazzago–Vellutex
- 2006: Acqua & Sapone (stagiaire)
- 2013: RCOP–Belarus
- 2022: Minsk Cycling Club

Professional teams
- 2007–2008: Acqua & Sapone–Caffè Mokambo
- 2009: Amica Chips–Knauf
- 2009–2010: Quick-Step
- 2011–2012: Movistar Team
- 2014–2017: CCC–Polsat–Polkowice
- 2018–2022: Minsk Cycling Club

Major wins
- One-day races and Classics National Time Trial Championships (2009, 2010, 2012) National Road Race Championships (2007)

Branislau Samoilau (Belarusian: Браніслаў Самойлаў; born 25 May 1985) is a Belarusian former road bicycle racer, who rode professionally between 2007 and 2022 for six different professional teams. He took six professional victories during his career, four of which came in National Championship races – three Belarusian National Time Trial Championships wins in 2009, 2010 and 2012, and the Belarusian National Road Race Championships in 2007.

== Career ==
Born in Vitebsk, Samoilau competed professionally for Acqua & Sapone–Caffè Mokambo between 2007 and 2008, a brief stint for Amica Chips–Knauf in 2009, for Quick-Step in 2009 and 2010, the Movistar Team in 2011 and 2012 and CCC–Polsat–Polkowice between 2014 and 2017. Samoilau won the Belarusian National Road Race Championships in 2007. He was national time trial champion of Belarus in 2009, 2010 and 2012.

Samoilau did not compete in the professional peloton in 2013, but joined CCC–Polsat–Polkowice for the 2014 season.

During the 2015 Tour of Austria, Samoilau was fined a month's salary by his team for having said "fucking nigger" to Natnael Berhane, a black rider from Eritrea.

== Major results ==
2004
1st Liège–Bastogne–Liège U23
1st Chieti–Casalincontrado–Blockhaus
3rd GP Capodarco
4th Overall Volta a Lleida

1st Mountains classification

7th Overall Giro delle Regioni

1st Stage 5

2005
1st Time trial, National Under-23 Road Championships
1st Overall Volta a Lleida

1st Stages 1, 2a (ITT) & 5

1st Trofeo Franco Balestra
1st Ruota d'Oro
9th Time trial, UEC European Under-23 Road Championships
10th Gran Premio Palio del Recioto
2006
1st Time trial, National Under-23 Road Championships
2007
National Road Championships

1st Road race
2nd Time trial

3rd Giro del Lazio
6th Time trial, UEC European Under-23 Road Championships
9th Time trial, UCI Under-23 Road World Championships
10th Gran Premio Città di Camaiore
2008
1st Stage 5 Settimana Ciclistica Lombarda
5th Overall Vuelta a Murcia
2009
1st Time trial, National Road Championships
3rd Overall Tour of Austria
10th Subida al Naranco
2010
1st Time trial, National Road Championships
2011
3rd Road race, National Road Championships
2012
1st Time trial, National Road Championships
2013
2nd Race Horizon Park II
3rd Time trial, National Road Championships
4th Overall Tour of Małopolska

1st Stage 3

9th Overall Baltic Chain Tour
2014
3rd Time trial, National Road Championships
4th Overall Cycling Tour of Sibiu

1st Stages 2 & 3a (TTT)

4th Coupe des Carpathes
2015
2nd Time trial, National Road Championships
6th Overall Tour of Croatia
2016
National Road Championships

2nd Time trial
3rd Road race

2017
1st Stage 1b (TTT) Settimana Internazionale di Coppi e Bartali
2018
1st Race Horizon Park Maidan
1st Race Horizon Park Classic
1st Stage 2 Tour of Mersin
National Road Championships

2nd Time trial
3rd Road race

2nd Minsk Cup
3rd Grand Prix Side
4th Overall Tour de Serbie

1st Stage 3

9th Overall Tour of Almaty
10th Grand Prix Alanya
2019
1st Overall Tour of Mesopotamia

1st Stage 1

1st Grand Prix Gazipaşa
2nd Time trial, National Road Championships
2nd Overall Tour of Mersin

1st Stage 1

8th Overall Tour of China I
10th Overall Tour of Qinghai Lake
10th Overall Tour of Xingtai
2020
1st GP Manavgat
2nd Time trial, National Road Championships

=== Grand Tour general classification results timeline ===
Grand Tour	2007	2008	2009	2010	2011	2012	2013	2014	2015	2016	2017
Giro d'Italia	22	—	—	39	45	43	—	—	48	—	112
Tour de France	Has not contested during his career										
Vuelta a España	—	—	—	DNF	—	—	—	—	—	—	—

Legend
—	Did not compete
DNF	Did not finish
