= Tour of Mesopotamia =

Annual road cycling race in Turkey

Race details
- Date: May
- Region: Turkey
- Discipline: Road
- Competition: UCI Europe Tour
- Type: Stage race
- Web site: www.tourofmesopotamia.com

History
- First edition: 2018
- Editions: 2 (as of 2019)
- First winner: Nazim Bakırcı (TUR)
- Most wins: No repeat winners
- Most recent: Branislau Samoilau (BLR)

Tour of Mesopotamia is a multi-day road cycling race held annually in Turkey since 2018. It is part of UCI Europe Tour in category 2.2.

== Winners ==
| Year | Country | Rider | Team |
|---|---|---|---|
| 2018 | Turkey | Nazim Bakırcı | Torku Şekerspor |
| 2019 | Belarus | Branislau Samoilau | Minsk Cycling Club |
