= Kirill Yatsevich =

Russian cyclist

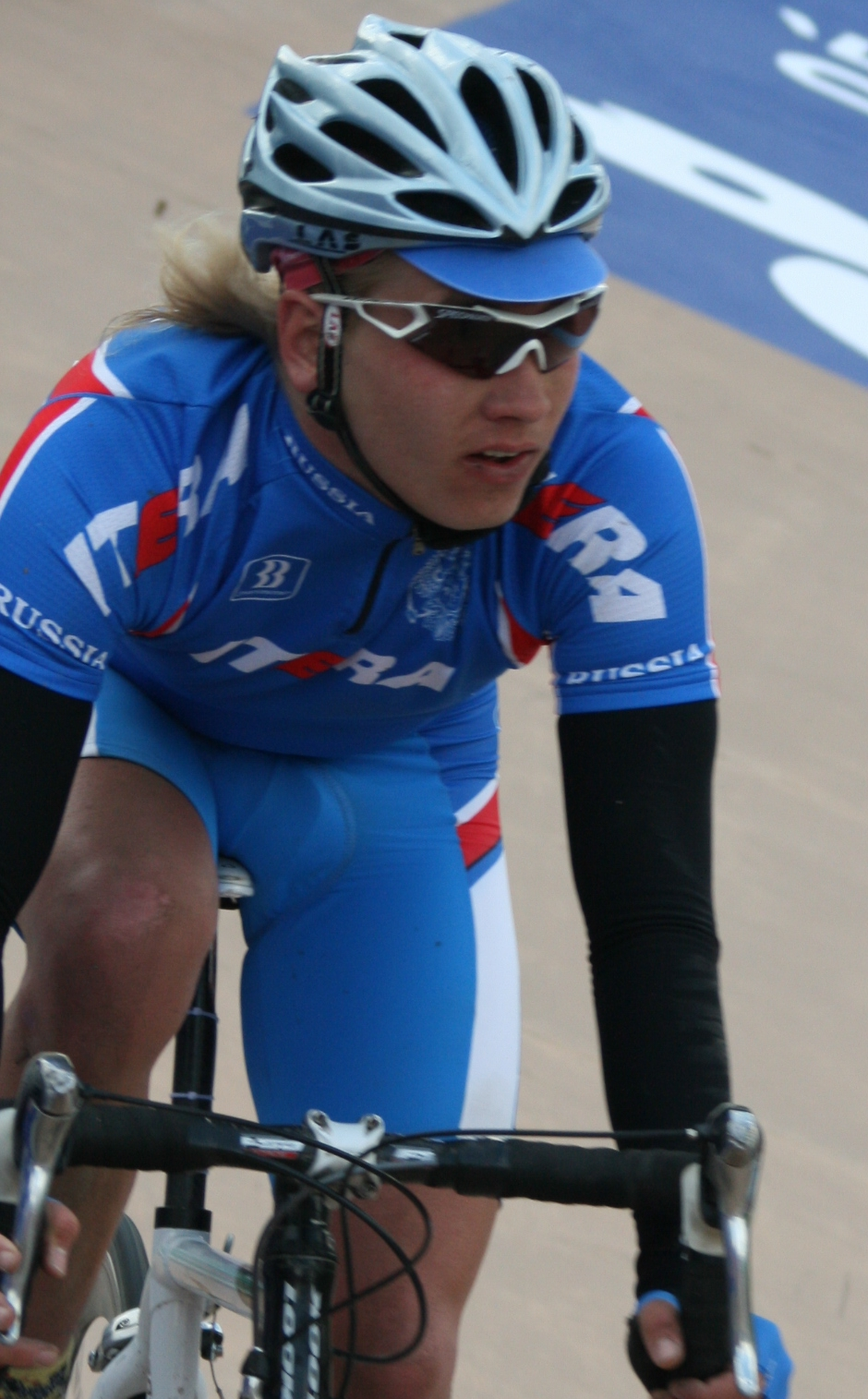
- A Russian male track cyclist

Personal information
- Born: 9 January 1992 (age 34)

Cycling career
- Sport: Cycling
- Disciplines: Road, track
- Role: Rider
- Rider type: Endurance (track)

Amateur team
- 2011–2012: Itera–Katusha

Professional teams
- 2013: Russian Helicopters
- 2014: Itera–Katusha

Kirill Yatsevich (born 9 January 1992) is a Russian male track cyclist, riding for the national team. As a junior he became world champion in the junior road race at the 2010 European Road Championships. He competed in the madison event at the 2011 UCI Track Cycling World Championships.

== Major results ==
2010
1st Time trial, UEC European Junior Road Championships
4th Paris–Roubaix Juniors
2012
2nd Overall Tour d'Azerbaïdjan

1st Stage 1 (TTT)

9th Trofeo Internazionale Bastianelli
2013
3rd ZLM Tour
2014
3rd Time trial, National Under-23 Road Championships
