= Sochi Cup =

Russian one-day road cycling race

Race details
- Date: March
- Region: Sochi, Russia
- Discipline: Road
- Competition: UCI Europe Tour
- Type: One day race

History
- First edition: 2015
- Editions: 1 (as of 2015)
- First winner: Uladzimir Harakhavik (BLR)
- Most wins: No repeat winners
- Most recent: Uladzimir Harakhavik (BLR)

Sochi Cup is a men's one-day cycle race which takes place in Sochi, Russia and was rated by the UCI as 1.2 and forms part of the UCI Europe Tour.

== Winners ==
Year	Country	Rider	Team
2015	Belarus	Uladzimir Harakhavik	Belarus National team
