= Volha Hayeva =

Belarusian cyclist

Personal information
- Born: 2 November 1982 (age 43) Belarus

Cycling career
- Sport: Cycling
- Discipline: Road cycling

Professional teams
- 2002: Raschiani-Alfa Lum R.S.M.
- 2003: Velodames-Colnago
- 2004: Aliverti-Bianchi-Kookai
- 2005: P.M.B. Fenixs
- 2006: Bianchi Alverti Kookai
- 2007: Cmax Dila-Guerciotti-Cogeas

Volha Hayeva (born 2 November 1982) is a road cyclist from Belarus. In 2004, she became national champion in the road race and represented her nation at the 2004 Summer Olympics. She also rode at the 2004 and 2005 UCI Road World Championships.
