= Aleksandr Riabushenko =

Belarusian cyclist

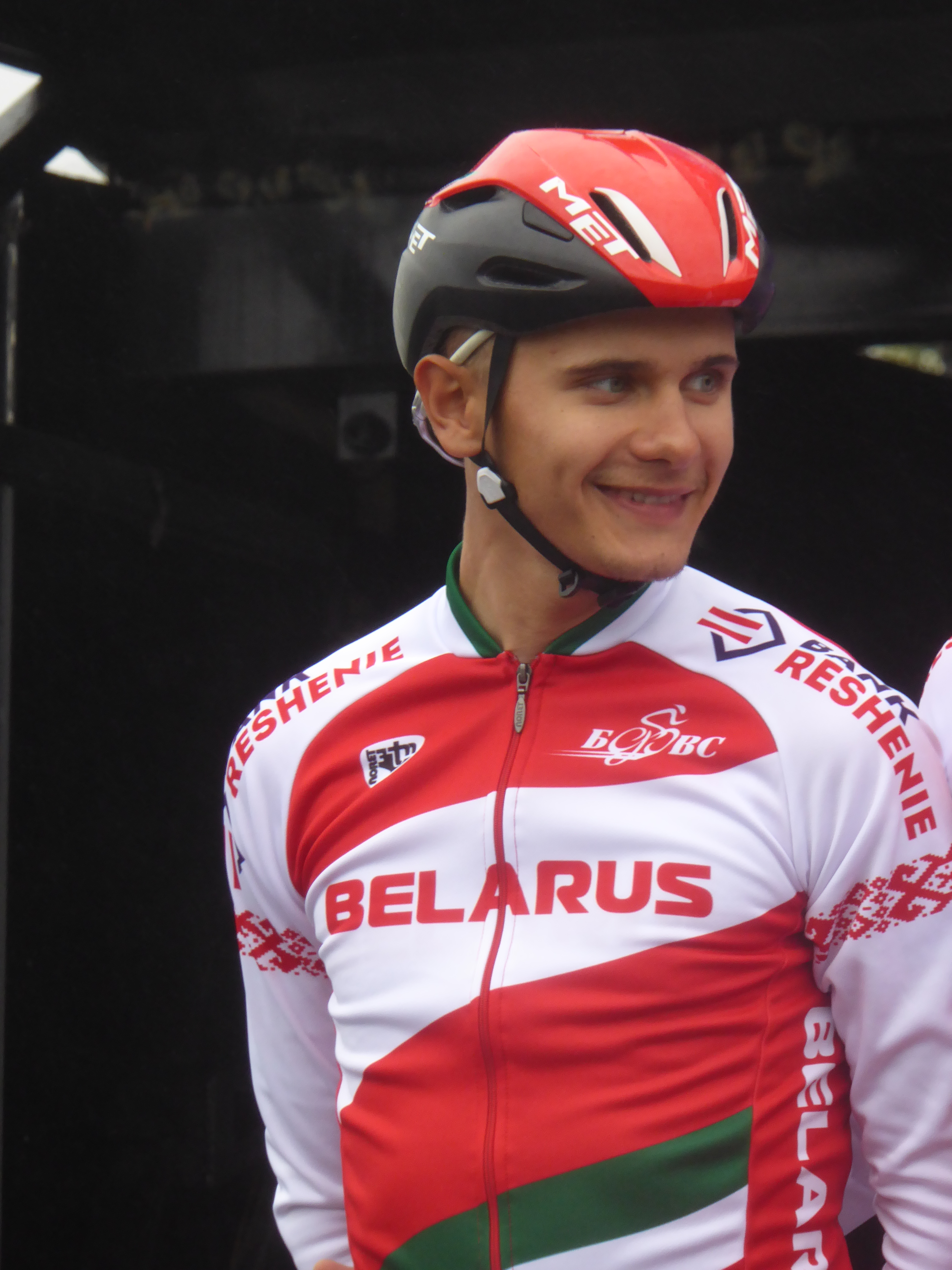
- Riabushenko at the 2018 European Road Cycling Championships

Personal information
- Full name: Aleksandr Svyatoslavovich Riabushenko
- Born: 12 October 1995 (age 31) Minsk, Belarus
- Height: 1.78 m (5 ft 10 in)
- Weight: 61 kg (134 lb)

Cycling career
- Sport: Cycling
- Current team: Retired
- Discipline: Road
- Role: Rider

Amateur teams
- 2016–2017: Team Pala Fenice
- 2017: UAE Team Emirates (stagiaire)

Professional teams
- 2018–2021: UAE Team Emirates
- 2022–2023: Astana Qazaqstan Team
Medal record
Representing Belarus
Men's road bicycle racing
European Championships
Gold medal – first place	2016 Plumelec	Under-23 road race

Aleksandr Svyatoslavovich Riabushenko (Belarusian: Аляксандр Святаслававіч Рабушэнка; born 12 October 1995) is a Belarusian former cyclist, who competed as a professional from 2018 to 2023. In October 2020, he was named in the startlist for the 2020 Vuelta a España.

== Personal life ==
His father, Svyatoslav Ryabushenko, also competed professionally as a cyclist.

== Major results ==
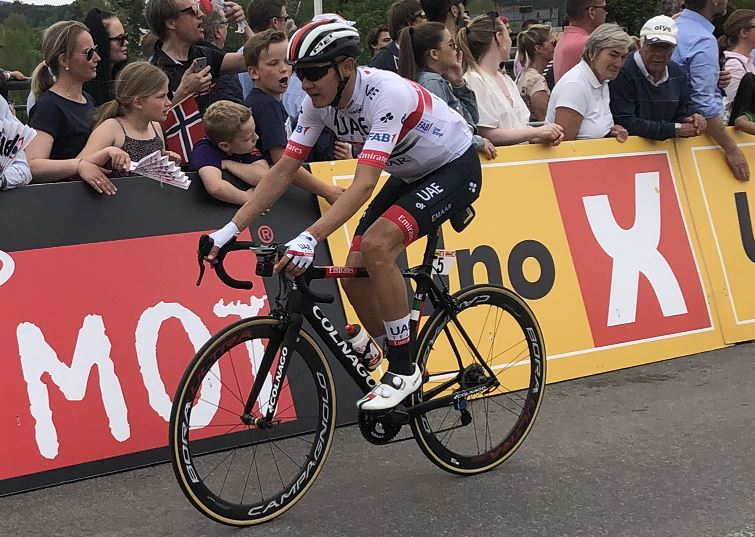
Riabushenko at the 2019 Tour of Norway

2013
1st Stage 3 Giro di Basilicata
2nd Overall Trophée Centre Morbihan

1st Mountains classification

2nd Trofeo Buffoni
7th Road race, UEC European Junior Road Championships
2014
3rd Time trial, National Under-23 Road Championships
7th Trofeo Città di San Vendemiano
9th Moscow Cup
2015
2nd Road race, National Under-23 Road Championships
10th Gran Premio della Liberazione
2016
1st Road race, UEC European Under-23 Road Championships
1st Coppa Collecchio
3rd GP Capodarco
4th Road race, National Road Championships
4th Gran Premio di Poggiana
7th Ruota d'Oro
2017
1st Giro del Belvedere
1st Piccolo Giro di Lombardia
1st Stage 2 Giro Ciclistico d'Italia
2nd Trofeo Alcide De Gasperi
3rd Road race, National Road Championships
3rd Trofeo Banca Popolare di Vicenza
3rd Trofeo Edil C
3rd Gran Premio della Liberazione
8th Overall Toscana-Terra di Ciclismo

1st Points classification
1st Stage 1b

10th Gran Premio di Poggiana
2019
1st Coppa Ugo Agostoni
2nd Gran Premio di Lugano
4th Road race, European Games
10th Overall Okolo Slovenska
2020
2nd Road race, National Road Championships
3rd Memorial Marco Pantani
3rd Coppa Sabatini

=== Grand Tour general classification results timeline ===
Grand Tour	2020	2021	2022
Giro d'Italia	—	—	—
Tour de France	—	—	97
Vuelta a España	90	—	—

Legend
—	Did not compete
DNF	Did not finish
