= Grand Prix of Vinnytsia =

Ukrainian one-day road cycling race

Race details
- Date: June
- Region: Vinnytsia Oblast
- Discipline: Road
- Competition: UCI Europe Tour
- Type: One-day race

History
- First edition: 2015
- Editions: 2
- Final edition: 2016
- First winner: Vitaliy Buts (UKR)
- Most wins: No repeat winners
- Final winner: Siarhei Papok (BLR)

The Grand Prix of Vinnytsia was a one-day road cycling race held in Ukraine in 2015 and 2016. It was part of the UCI Europe Tour, as a category 1.2 race.

== Winners ==
Year	Country	Rider	Team
2015	Ukraine	Vitaliy Buts	Kolss BDC Team
2016	Belarus	Siarhei Papok	Minsk Cycling Club
