= Grand Prix Velo Alanya (men's race) =

Men's cycling race

Race details
- Date: March
- Discipline: Road
- Competition: UCI Europe Tour
- Type: One-day race
- Web site: gp.veloalanya.com

History
- First edition: 2019
- Editions: 4 (as of 2022)
- First winner: Nikolai Shumov (BLR)
- Most wins: No repeat winners
- Most recent: Igor Chzhan (KAZ)

The Grand Prix Velo Alanya is a cycling race held in Turkey. It is part of UCI Europe Tour in category 1.2.

== Winners ==
Year	Country	Rider	Team
2019	Belarus	Nikolai Shumov	Minsk Cycling Club
2020	Kazakhstan	Daniil Pronskiy	Vino–Astana Motors
2021	Colombia	Carlos Quintero	Terengganu Cycling Team
2022	Kazakhstan	Igor Chzhan	Almaty Cycling Team
