= Grand Prix Gazipaşa (men's race) =

Race details
- Date: February
- Discipline: Road
- Competition: UCI Europe Tour
- Type: One-day race
- Web site: gpgazipasa.veloalanya.com

History
- First edition: 2019
- Editions: 4 (as of 2022)
- First winner: Branislau Samoilau (BLR)
- Most wins: No repeat winners
- Most recent: Onur Balkan (TUR)

The Grand Prix Gazipaşa is a one-day road cycling race held in Turkey. It is part of UCI Europe Tour in category 1.2.

== Winners ==
Year	Country	Rider	Team
2019	Belarus	Branislau Samoilau	Minsk Cycling Club
2020	Russia	Mamyr Stash	Russia
2021	Belarus	Raman Tsishkou	BelAZ
2022	Turkey	Onur Balkan	Sakarya BB Pro Team
