= Minsk Cycling Club (men's team) =

Belarusian cycling team

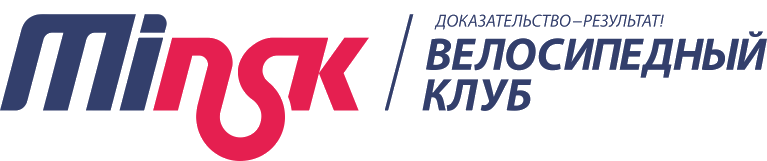

Team information
- UCI code: MCC
- Registered: Belarus
- Founded: 2014
- Discipline: Road
- Status: National (2014); UCI Continental (2015– )
- Bicycles: Aist

Key personnel
- General manager: Aleksei Ivanov
- Team managers: Aleksandr Kuschynski; Dzmitryi Azarkevich; Yauheni Hutarovich

Team name history
- 2014 2015–: Team Minsk; Minsk Cycling Club
Minsk Cycling Club jersey
Jersey

Minsk Cycling Club is a Belarusian UCI Continental team founded in 2014, that competes on the road and track.

After the 2022 Russian invasion of Ukraine, the UCI said that Belarusian teams are forbidden from competing in international events.

== Team roster ==
As of 15 February 2022.

Rider	Date of birth
Stanislau Bazhkou (BLR)	4 November 1991 (age 34)
Vasili Bialiauski (BLR)	21 December 1995 (age 30)
Ivan Charniauski (BLR)	15 October 1999 (age 26)
Yauheni Karaliok (BLR)	9 June 1996 (age 30)
Dzianis Mazur (BLR)	19 April 2000 (age 26)
Siarhei Papok (BLR)	6 January 1988 (age 38)

Rider	Date of birth
Aliaksandr Piasetski (BLR)	15 May 1993 (age 33)
Branislau Samoilau (BLR)	25 May 1985 (age 41)
Siarhei Shauchenka (BLR)	1 April 1998 (age 28)
Aliaksei Shnyrko (BLR)	12 May 1994 (age 32)
Yauhen Sobal (BLR)	7 April 1981 (age 45)
Vasili Strokau (BLR)	9 October 1995 (age 30)

== Major wins ==
2015

Grand Prix of Moscow, Siarhei Papok
Stage 1 Five Rings of Moscow, Siarhei Papok
Grand Prix Minsk, Siarhei Papok
Stage 6 Tour of China I, Siarhei Papok
2016
Stages 2b & 3 Tour of Ukraine, Siarhei Papok
Grand Prix of Vinnytsia, Siarhei Papok
Stage 4 Tour de Serbie, Kanstantsin Klimiankou
Overall Course de Solidarność et des Champions Olympiques, Yauhen Sobal

Stage 5, Yauhen Sobal

Grand Prix Minsk, Siarhei Papok
Prologue Tour of Taihu Lake, Oleksandr Golovash
2017
Stage 3 La Tropicale Amissa Bongo, Stanislau Bazhkou
Stage 6 La Tropicale Amissa Bongo, Oleksandr Golovash
Overall Tour of Mersin, Stanislau Bazhkou

Stage 1, Stanislau Bazhkou
Stage 2, Siarhei Papok

Belarus National Time Trial Championships, Stanislau Bazhkou
Grand Prix Minsk, Yauheni Karaliok
Stage 3 Tour of Qinghai Lake, Stanislau Bazhkou
2018
Stage 3 Tour of Cartier, Nikolai Shumov
Overall Tour of Mersin, Eduard Vorganov

Stage 2, Branislau Samoilau
Stage 3, Eduard Vorganov
Stage 4, Yauheni Karaliok

Stage 2 Five Rings of Moscow, Stanislau Bazhkou
Stage 3 Five Rings of Moscow, Vasili Strokau
Stage 1 Tour of Estonia, Yauheni Karaliok
Horizon Park Race Maidan, Branislau Samoilau
Horizon Park Race Classic, Branislau Samoilau
Stage 3 Tour de Serbie, Branislau Samoilau
Belarus National Road Race Championships, Branislau Samoilau
Grand Prix Minsk, Nikolai Shumov
2019
Grand Prix Gazipasa, Branislau Samoilau
Grand Prix Velo Alanya, Nikolai Shumov
Stage 1 Tour of Mersin, Branislau Samoilau
Overall Tour of Mesopotamia, Branislau Samoilau

Stage 1, Branislau Samoilau

Overall Five Rings of Moscow, Yauhen Sobal

Stage 1 Nikolai Shumov

Horizon Park Race for Peace, Yauhen Sobal
Belarus National Time Trial Championships, Yauhen Sobal
Stage 9 Tour of Qinghai Lake, Siarhei Papok
Stage 2 Tour of Xingtai, Vasili Strokau
Grand Prix Erciyes, Nikolai Shumov
Stage 1 Tour of Kayseri, Stanislau Bazhkou
2020
GP Manavgat, Branislau Samoilau
Belarus National Road Race Championships, Yauhen Sobal
Belarus National Time Trial Championships, Yauheni Karaliok
2021
Stage 2 Tour of Mevlana, Siarhei Shauchenka
Belarus National Time Trial Championships, Yauheni Karaliok
Belarus National Road Race Championships, Stanislau Bazhkou
2022
Grand Prix Justiniano Hotels, Yauheni Karaliok

== National champions ==
2017
Belarus Time Trial, Stanislau Bazhkou
Belarus U23 Time Trial, Yauheni Karaliok

2018
Belarus Time Trial, Branislau Samoilau

2019
Belarus Time Trial, Yauhen Sobal

2020
Belarus Road Race, Yauhen Sobal
Belarus Time Trial, Yauheni Karaliok

2021
Belarus Time Trial, Yauheni Karaliok
Belarus Road Race, Stanislau Bazhkou
