= Grand Prix Minsk =

Belarusian one-day road cycling race

Race details
- Date: July (2015–2017); August (2018); May (2019)
- Region: Minsk
- Discipline: Road
- Competition: UCI Europe Tour
- Type: One day race

History
- First edition: 2015
- Editions: 5 (as of 2019)
- First winner: Siarhei Papok (BLR)
- Most wins: Siarhei Papok (BLR) (2 wins)
- Most recent: Norman Vahtra (EST)

The Grand Prix Minsk is a one-day cycling race held in Minsk, Belarus. From 2015 to 2019, it was part of the UCI Europe Tour in category 1.2.

== Winners ==
Year	Country	Rider	Team
2015	Belarus	Siarhei Papok	Minsk
2016	Belarus	Siarhei Papok	Minsk Cycling Club
2017	Belarus	Yauheni Karaliok	Minsk Cycling Club
2018	Belarus	Nikolai Shumov	Minsk Cycling Club
2019	Estonia	Norman Vahtra	Estonia (national team)
2020– 2021	No race due to the COVID-19 pandemic in Belarus		
