= Tour de Ribas =

Road cycling race in Ukraine

Race details
- Date: August
- Region: Ukraine
- Discipline: Road
- Competition: UCI Europe Tour
- Type: One-day race

History
- First edition: 2016
- Editions: 4 (as of 2019)
- First winner: Andriy Vasylyuk (UKR)
- Most wins: No repeat winners
- Most recent: Onur Balkan (TUR)

The Tour de Ribas is a one-day road cycling race held annually in Ukraine. It is part of UCI Europe Tour in category 1.2.

== Winners ==
| Year | Country | Rider | Team |
|---|---|---|---|
| 2016 | Ukraine | Andriy Vasylyuk | Kolss BDC Team |
| 2017 | Ukraine | Sergiy Lagkuti | Kolss Cycling Team |
| 2018 | Ukraine | Andriy Gladkyy | |
| 2019 | Turkey | Onur Balkan | Salcano–Sakarya |
