= Minsk Cup =

Race details
- Date: May
- Region: Minsk
- Discipline: Road
- Competition: UCI Europe Tour
- Type: One day race

History
- First edition: 2015
- Editions: 5 (as of 2021)
- First winner: Oleksandr Golovash (UKR)
- Most wins: No repeat winners
- Most recent: Yauheni Karaliok (BLR)

The Minsk Cup is a one-day cycling race held annually in Minsk, Belarus. It is part of UCI Europe Tour in category 1.2.

== Winners ==
Year	Country	Rider	Team
2015	Ukraine	Oleksandr Golovash	Kolss BDC Team
2016	Russia	Alexandr Kulikovskiy	Russia (national team)
2017	Ukraine	Yegor Dementyev	ISD–Jorbi
2018	Poland	Maciej Paterski	Wibatech Merx 7R
2019	Belarus	Yauheni Karaliok	
2020	No race due to COVID-19 pandemic		
2021	No race due to COVID-19 pandemic		
