= Race Horizon Park =

Ukrainian one-day road cycling races

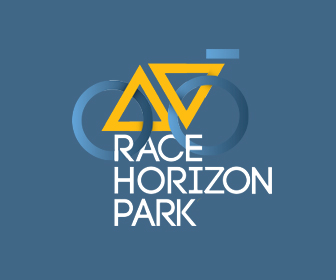

Race details
- Date: last weekend of May, the Day of Kyiv
- Region: Ukraine
- Discipline: Road
- Competition: Europe Tour
- Type: Several one-day races
- Organiser: Alexander Bashenko
- Race director: Sergey Kotenko
- Web site: www.racehorizonpark.com

Race Horizon Park is an international cycling road race (category UCI (Union Cycliste Internationale) 1.2, within the Europe Tour calendar), held annually in the capital of Ukraine, during the celebration of the Day of Kyiv. As a part of the bicycle race, a traditional parade of amateur cyclists is held as well – Bicycle Day.

== History ==
Kyiv cycle race has more than a 60-year history. Even during the USSR time cycling on Khreschatyk Street in the Day of Kyiv was one of the main attributes and traditions of the holiday, performed with great resonance and mass audience. Many people remember the fatal Peace Race held in 1986 on Khreshchatyk immediately after the accident at the Chernobyl nuclear power plant, when the authorities didn’t report about the Chernobyl tragedy.

For a long period of time, there had been no cycle races on Khreshchatyk. But in 2008, the capital cycling was revived and acquired a new name - Race Horizon Park, and greatly expanded the number and level of activities. Since that time, Race Horizon Park cycling is a few bright racing on the highway, passing in a closed ring of the city and collecting a large number of spectators

In 2011, Ukrainian cycling Race Horizon Park was recognized by the international experts. Having received the status of a categorical race (1.2), it was registered in the calendar of the Union Cycliste Internationale (UCI). In addition to the image and prestige, this status greatly expanded the number of participants, the length of the route, the level of judges and the professionalism of riders.

In 2012, the first cycling of the new international status was held at the highest level by confirmation of the chief judge, the UCI International Commissioner Vladimiros Petsas.

In 2013, instead of one-day international race, the organizers decided to hold two one-day cycling Race Horizon Park of full status and categorization. One of which was held in Holosiyivo district, and the second one - traditionally in Solomyanskyi district of Kyiv.

In 2014, the UCI confirmed the holding of the three-day international cycling Race Horizon Park in Kyiv. The traditional Saturday Criterium on Khreshchatyk, that in 2014 has already taken place in the international status on Velyka Vasylkivska street. The rerouting was associated with an overlap of the main street - Khreshchatyk and Maidan Nezalezhnosti after the revolutionary events on Euromaidan. One of the new route’s sections laid on the pavement, that made the race even more spectacular and difficult.

In 2012–2014, famous personalities such as Alexander Vinokourov, Dzhamolidin Abduzhaparov, Geoffrey R. Pyatt, Sergey Bubka, Dmytro Bulatov were the guests of the event under the name Race Horizon Park.

Routes in 2014

The first day, May 30. Race Horizon Park-1 (road race) was held in a circle: Holosiivskyi Ave., Holosiivska str., Sciences Ave., Blakitnogo str., Heroiv Oborony str.

The second day, May 31. Race Horizon Park-2 (road race) was held in a circle: Velyka Vasylkivska str., Kovpak str., Gorky str., Lubchenco str., Velyka Vasylkivska str., Tolstoy str., Velyka Vasylkivska str.

The third day, June 1. Race Horizon Park-3 (road race) takes place in a circle: Mykola Grinchenko str, Kirovogradska str., Chervonozіrkovy Ave., Andryi Golovko str., Solomyanska str., Protasiv Yar str.

=== 2016 ===
Race Horizon Park celebrated its fifth anniversary as the international road race. To commemorate the memorable date, organizers prepared many surprises for all cycling fans.

For the first time Friday`s cycling route of the Horizon Park Race for Peace was held not in the city, but near Kyiv (to avoid traffic jams). Specifically for this event legendary track- the so-called "Olympic Ring" built in 1980 - was renovated.

Unfortunately, the weather affected the traditional Saturday race of the Horizon Park Race Maidan. By the decision of the international commissioner the race was stopped due to heavy rainfall, which began almost immediately after the start of the race and led to a drop of more than 70 athletes, more than ten got different types of trauma.

Also for the first time the international professional road race for women – Horizon Park Women Challenge (on the road) and VR Women ITT Race (trial) - was held. It allowed the Ukrainian athletes, who had won the races, to take two licenses for the Olympic Games in Rio de Janeiro. In honor of the holiday the «Ukrposhta» released a special commemorative stamp – the 5 years Race Horizon Park.

=== 2017 ===
A series of traditional international race days Race Horizon Park took place in Kyiv for the 6th time. 32 teams (165 riders) from 10 countries took part in the competitions. The total length of the routes of all 5 races (3 male, 2 female) was 476.9 kilometers.

The main judge of the Race Horizon Park in 2017 was the famous UCI Commissioner Jakob Knudsen (Denmark). The Horizon Park Race Maidan race ran along an altered 19-kilometer ring, the longest circle in the history of the Race Horizon Park. The route was changed to make the race bigger and more accessible to viewers from more remote areas of Kyiv.

Another feature of Horizon Park Race Maidan was a special interim award from Andrei Grivko, the best rider of Ukraine, representing the colors of Kazakhstan team Astana. After a series of international starts, the head of the organizing committee Race Horizon Park and the president of the Cycling Federation of Ukraine, Alexander Bashenko decided in 2018 to raise the category of Race Horizon Park to 1.1.

== Race name ==
The race title is formed from the name of the business centers - Horizon Park Business Cente, the owner of which is the organizer of cycling Alexander Borysovych Bashenko. For A. Bashenko the revival of cycle racing in Kyiv is a tribute to his father Borys Arsenievych Bashenko’s memory, who had been a president of the Cycling Federation of Ukraine and the General Secretary of the National Olympic Committee. Today Alexander Bashenko is also a president of Cycling Federation of Ukraine.

== Race rules ==
The participants of the one-day road bicycle race Race Horizon Park 1, 2 and 3 (category UCI 1.2, within the Europe Tour calendar) in accordance with item 2.1.006 of the UCI Regulations can be the athletes of Men category up to 23 years. The length of each route is about 160 km. In accordance with item 2.1.005 of the UCI Regulations the UCI continental team, national teams, regional and club teams can participate in the competition. In accordance with article 2.2.003 of the UCI Regulations, the teams must consist of at least four (4) and a maximum of six (6) riders. The first 20 riders crossed the finish line, following the UCI Regulations, receive cash rewards. The total sum of prize is 10,818 euros. In accordance with the UCI Regulations, the points in the UCI individual rating are awarded to the first eight riders in accordance with the following table:

Place	Points
1	40
2	30
3	16
4	12
5	10
6	8
7	6
8	3

== Men's races ==
=== Kyiv Green Race ===
The race was known as Race Horizon Park in 2012, Race Horizon Park 1 in 2013 and 2014, and the Horizon Park Race for Peace between 2015 and 2019.

Year	Country	Rider	Team
2012	Ukraine	Vitaly Popkov	ISD–Lampre Continental
2013	Ukraine	Denys Kostyuk	Kolss Cycling Team
2014	Ukraine	Vitaliy Buts	Kolss Cycling Team
2015	Ukraine	Sergiy Lagkuti	Kolss BDC Team
2016	Ukraine	Vitaliy Buts	Kolss BDC Team
2017	Ukraine	Mykhaylo Kononenko	Kolss Cycling Team
2018	Denmark	Frederik Muff	Team Aura Energy–CK Aarhus
2019	Belarus	Yauhen Sobal	Minsk Cycling Club
2020– 2021	No race due to the COVID-19 pandemic in Ukraine		
2022	No race due to the Russian invasion of Ukraine		

=== Kyiv Cup ===
The race was known as Race Horizon Park 2 in 2013 and 2014, and the Horizon Park Race Maidan between 2015 and 2019.

Year	Country	Rider	Team
2013	Ukraine	Mykhaylo Kononenko	Kolss Cycling Team
2014	Ukraine	Mykhaylo Kononenko	Kolss Cycling Team
2015	Ukraine	Oleksandr Polivoda	Kolss BDC Team
2016	No race due to bad weather		
2017	Denmark	Rasmus Esmann Ginnerup	Team Aura Energy–CK Aarhus
2018	Belarus	Branislau Samoilau	Minsk Cycling Club
2019	Belarus	Uladzislau Tsimoshyk	Belarus U23 (national team)
2020– 2021	No race due to the COVID-19 pandemic in Ukraine		
2022	No race due to the Russian invasion of Ukraine		

=== Kyiv Speed Challenge ===
The race was known as Race Horizon Park 3 in 2014, and the Horizon Park Classic between 2015 and 2019.

Year	Country	Rider	Team
2014	Ukraine	Denys Kostyuk	Kolss Cycling Team
2015	Ukraine	Mykhaylo Kononenko	Kolss BDC Team
2016	Ukraine	Mykhaylo Kononenko	Kolss BDC Team
2017	Ukraine	Oleksandr Prevar	Kolss Cycling Team
2018	Belarus	Branislau Samoilau	Minsk Cycling Club
2019	Ukraine	Andriy Vasylyuk	Kyiv Capital Team
2020– 2021	No race due to the COVID-19 pandemic in Ukraine		
2022	No race due to the Russian invasion of Ukraine		

=== Chabany Race ===
Year	Country	Rider	Team
2019	Ukraine	Andriy Vasylyuk	Kyiv Capital Team
2020– 2021	No race due to the COVID-19 pandemic in Ukraine		

== Women's races ==
=== Kyiv Green Race ===
The race was known as the Horizon Park Women Challenge between 2016 and 2018 and the Kyiv Olimpic Ring Women Race in 2019.

Year	Country	Rider	Team
2016	Ukraine	Tetyana Ryabchenko	Ukraine (national team)
2017	Slovakia	Alžbeta Pavlendová	Slovakia (national team)
2018	Ukraine	Yevheniya Vysotska	Ukraine (national team)
2019	Belarus	Hanna Tserakh	Minsk Cycling Club
2020– 2021	No race due to the COVID-19 pandemic in Ukraine		
2022	No race due to the Russian invasion of Ukraine		

=== VR Women ITT ===
Year	Country	Rider	Team
2016	Ukraine	Valeriya Kononenko	Ukraine (national team)
2017	Ukraine	Hanna Solovey	Parkhotel Valkenburg–Destil
2018	Cyprus	Antri Christoforou	Cogeas–Mettler Pro Cycling Team
2019	Ukraine	Valeriya Kononenko	Lviv Cycling Team
2020– 2021	No race due to the COVID-19 pandemic in Ukraine		

=== Chabany Race ===
Year	Country	Rider	Team
2019	Ukraine	Olga Shekel	Ukraine (national team)
2020– 2021	No race due to the COVID-19 pandemic in Ukraine		

=== Kyiv Cup ===
The race was known as the Kyivska Sotka Women Challenge in 2019.

Year	Country	Rider	Team
2019	Poland	Katarzyna Wilkos	MAT ATOM
2020– 2021	No race due to the COVID-19 pandemic in Ukraine		
2022	No race due to the Russian invasion of Ukraine		
