= 2011 Lampre–ISD season =

2011 Lampre–ISD season
Manager	Giuseppe Saronni (Note: Saronni left the post on April 30 amid the Mantova doping investigation); Roberto Damiani (Note: Damiani assumed the role on April 30, from Saronni)
One-day victories	3
Stage race overall victories	3
Stage race stage victories	16
Previous season • Next season

The 2011 season for Lampre–ISD began in January at the Tour Down Under and ended in October at the Japan Cup. As a UCI ProTeam, they were automatically invited and obligated to send a squad to every event in the UCI World Tour.

== 2011 roster ==
Ages as of January 1, 2011.

Rider	Date of birth
Alfredo Balloni (ITA)	September 20, 1989 (aged 21)
Leonardo Bertagnolli (ITA)	January 8, 1978 (aged 32)
Grega Bole (SLO)	August 13, 1985 (aged 25)
Matteo Bono (ITA)	November 11, 1983 (aged 27)
Vitaliy Buts (UKR)	October 24, 1986 (aged 24)
Damiano Cunego (ITA)	September 19, 1981 (aged 29)
Francesco Gavazzi (ITA)	August 1, 1984 (aged 26)
Massimo Graziato (Note: Rider joined the team on August 1 as a stagiaire.) (ITA)	September 25, 1988 (aged 22)
Danilo Hondo (GER)	January 4, 1974 (aged 36)
Andrey Kashechkin (Note: Kashechkin left the team on August 1.) (KAZ)	March 21, 1980 (aged 30)
Vitaly Kondrut (UKR)	August 15, 1984 (aged 26)
Denys Kostyuk (UKR)	March 13, 1982 (aged 28)
Dmytro Krivtsov (UKR)	April 3, 1985 (aged 25)
Oleksandr Kvachuk (UKR)	July 23, 1983 (aged 27)
David Loosli (SUI)	May 8, 1980 (aged 30)

Rider	Date of birth
Enrico Magazzini (ITA)	April 27, 1988 (aged 22)
Adriano Malori (ITA)	January 28, 1988 (aged 22)
Marco Marzano (ITA)	June 10, 1980 (aged 30)
Manuele Mori (ITA)	August 9, 1980 (aged 30)
Przemysław Niemiec (POL)	April 11, 1980 (aged 30)
Aitor Pérez (ESP)	July 24, 1977 (aged 33)
Alessandro Petacchi (ITA)	January 3, 1974 (aged 36)
Daniele Pietropolli (ITA)	July 11, 1980 (aged 30)
Daniele Righi (ITA)	March 28, 1976 (aged 34)
Michele Scarponi (ITA)	September 25, 1979 (aged 31)
Alessandro Spezialetti (ITA)	January 14, 1975 (aged 35)
Simon Špilak (SLO)	June 23, 1986 (aged 24)
Bálint Szeghalmi (HUN)	September 16, 1980 (aged 30)
Mirko Tedeschi (ITA)	December 17, 1987 (aged 23)
Thomas Tiozzo (ITA)	June 19, 1987 (aged 23)
Diego Ulissi (ITA)	July 15, 1989 (aged 21)

Riders who joined the team for the 2011 season

Rider	2010 team
Leonardo Bertagnolli	Androni Giocattoli
Andrey Kashechkin	ex-pro (Astana, 2007)
Vitaly Kondrut	ISD–NERI
Denys Kostyuk	ISD–NERI
Dmytro Krivtsov	ISD–NERI
Alexander Kvachuk	ISD–NERI
Przemysław Niemiec	Miche–Silver Cross
Aitor Pérez	Footon–Servetto–Fuji
Michele Scarponi	Androni Giocattoli
Balint Szeghalmi	Tușnad Cycling Team

Riders who left the team during or after the 2010 season

Rider	2011 team
Lorenzo Bernucci	Suspended
Emanuele Bindi	Meridiana Kamen
Mauro Da Dalto	Liquigas–Cannondale
Angelo Furlan	Christina Watches
Andrea Grendene	Team Type 1–Sanofi Aventis
Mirco Lorenzetto	Astana
Massimiliano Mori	Retired
Simone Ponzi	Liquigas–Cannondale
Marcin Sapa	BDC Team
Gilberto Simoni	Retired

== One-day races ==
For the first time since 2004, Petacchi did not win the Gran Premio della Costa Etruschi, as the six-time reigning champion did not ride the event. The squad's highest finisher was Gavazzi, who was eighth in the mass sprint finish. Later in February, Pietropolli won the Trofeo Laigueglia after making a late-forming ten-rider selection, and winning the sprint. He noted after the race that he had, in his career, finished in every position from second through tenth in the Trofeo Laigueglia, and could now finally add first.

=== Spring classics ===
At the first monument race of the season, Milan–San Remo, the team had to alter their plans based on how the race played out. A crash occurred on the Le Manie climb 90 km (56 mi) from the finish of the race, and the group that was left behind never fully caught up to those who avoided the crash. Petacchi, who had won the event in 2005, made the split, but Scarponi did not. While Petacchi would ostensibly be a strong favorite for a sprint finish from a depleted front group, Scarponi put in an intensive effort on the Cipressa, the day's penultimate climb, to bridge from the second group up to the first. He later said he did this with Petacchi's blessing. Once in the front group, Scarponi easily made the next selection, taking place on the Poggio, which led to eight riders finishing together at the front of the race. The pace of this split was too hard for Petacchi, and he finished 12th, 27 seconds back. Scarponi hit out early from the leading group of eight to try for victory, but he was easily overhauled by most of the group, finishing sixth on the day. On the same day as the monument classic Paris–Roubaix, Cunego won the Giro dell'Appennino race, outsprinting Emanuele Sella at the front of a seven-rider leading group. Lampre-ISD was the only UCI ProTeam in the race.

The team also sent squads to the Gran Premio dell'Insubria-Lugano, the Gran Premio di Lugano, E3 Prijs Vlaanderen – Harelbeke, Gent–Wevelgem, the Tour of Flanders, the Scheldeprijs, Paris–Roubaix, the Amstel Gold Race, La Flèche Wallonne, Liège–Bastogne–Liège and the Giro di Toscana, but placed no higher than 12th in any of these races.

=== Fall races ===
The team also sent squads to the Gran Premio Nobili Rubinetterie, the Clásica de San Sebastián, Tre Valli Varesine, the Gran Premio Industria e Commercio Artigianato Carnaghese, the Giro della Romagna, the Grand Prix Cycliste de Québec, the Memorial Marco Pantani, the Coppa Sabatini, the Gran Premio Bruno Beghelli and Paris–Tours, but placed no higher than 11th in any of these races.

== Stage races ==
The team got their first win of the season at the Giro della Provincia di Reggio Calabria, the first race of the year held in Italy. Pietropolli made a late selection on the uphill finish to stage 1 and won the sprint ahead of six others at the front of the race. The two succeeding stages also featured small sprint finishes, and Pietropolli made all the selections both days, ensuring his overall win. It was the second time he had won the race, having previously done so in 2008 while riding for LPR Brakes–Ballan. Both of the team's leaders took wins at the Giro di Sardegna in late February. Cunego won stage 2, finishing best of a small group that had also included Scarponi, who revealed after the stage that the plan was to work for Cunego should this scenario play out. It was Cunego's first victory in over a year, since a stage of the 2009 Vuelta a España. Scarponi won the race's last stage three days later with a solo attack on the uphill finale. The team had tried to make the race difficult for leader Peter Sagan, in the hopes of having Cunego surpass him in the standings. However, the young Slovak's fourth place on the day gave him the race overall, with Cunego finishing third. Scarponi and Cunego both entered Tirreno–Adriatico in March. After the stage 1 team time trial put them 37 seconds off the race lead, Scarponi took back much of that time in stage 4. For the second year in a row, he won the stage into Chieti and moved up to fourth by so doing. Cunego rode the stage's finale in the team's best interests, marking Philippe Gilbert and Cadel Evans' separate attempts to bridge up to Scarponi in first position, but not helping either. Should either have caught Scarponi, Cunego would have been in excellent position to take victory himself. When it became clear that Scarponi would win, Cunego accelerated past Evans for second, giving the team the top two places on the day. Scarponi ended the race in third overall, and won the points classification. Cunego was eighth.

The Settimana Internazionale di Coppi e Bartali stage race was largely dominated by Androni Giocattoli and Emanuele Sella. Lampre-ISD did obtain two noteworthy results in the race, though. Malori won the stage 4 time trial in Crevalcore, with teammate Ulissi sixth. Sella was a minute back on the stage, but the Italian climber still had time in hand to win the race overall by 30 seconds over Ulissi in second. Ulissi won the youth classification with this performance. Petacchi took a sprint win, his first of the season, at the partly concurrent Volta a Catalunya. Stage 2 was one of the few in that race set to be decided by the sprinters, and the team brought back both the morning breakaway and a late two-man escape to set Petacchi up for the win. He had been the first across the line from the main field the day before as well, but it was only for second place behind solo winner Gatis Smukulis. In April, Scarponi won the Giro del Trentino, a race traditionally seen as one of the last tune-ups before the Giro d'Italia, without winning a stage. He limited his losses in the stage 1 individual time trial, coming home 12th at 27 seconds down on the winner Andreas Klöden. The next day, he finished 25 seconds clear of the main field, with stage winner Thomas Voeckler. He finished sufficiently near the front of the race in stages 3 and 4 to claim victory by 7 seconds over Team RadioShack's Tiago Machado.

Petacchi had a somewhat peculiar Presidential Cycling Tour of Turkey. The race is predominantly flat, with several stages meant to end in group sprints, though also with at least one stage hilly enough to ensure that a sprinter is not the overall winner. He had the best position near the front of the peloton in stage 1, which was setting up for a field sprint. He was unable to hold his position, coming across the line eighth, but he was subsequently given a one-minute penalty for hitting FDJ's Nacer Bouhanni which put him dead last in the overall classification. He stayed at the front of the race for the sprint finish to stage 2, but lost to Astana's Valentin Iglinsky, a relatively unheralded rider. He was also defeated in the stage 3 sprint, by three riders from UCI Professional Continental teams. Stage 4 was the Tour's queen stage, and most hilly. Petacchi managed to stay with the front group over the tall climb early in the race, and stayed with the main peloton the rest of the stage. Just as they had been for the first three stages, the Lampre-ISD team was most responsible for chasing down the breakaway. Petacchi at one time actually told Pérez and Kostyuk to stop the chase, but they pressed on and caught the escapees. Petacchi and new race leader Bartosz Huzarski put in such a fast sprint for the finish line that they took a 1-second time gap over the rest of the 32-strong leading group, and Petacchi won the stage he was perhaps least likely to win. His time gap to Huzarski was 50 seconds, meaning he would have been race leader if not for the stage 1 penalty. Petacchi took the points lead with the victory, and retained it through to the conclusion of the race. At the concurrent Tour de Romandie, Cunego won the undulating second stage with a late attack on the final ascent, finishing two seconds clear of the rest of the 23-strong leading group who had only just caught a four-man breakaway.

The team also won lesser classifications at Tirreno–Adriatico, the Settimana internazionale di Coppi e Bartali, the Tour of Turkey, the Tour of Slovenia, and the Brixia Tour. The team also sent squads to the Tour Down Under, the Tour of Qatar, the Tour of Oman, Paris–Nice, the Three Days of De Panne, the Bayern-Rundfahrt, the Critérium du Dauphiné, the Tour de Pologne, the Giro di Padania and the Tour of Beijing, but did not achieve a stage win, classification win, or podium finish in any of them.

== Season victories ==
Date	Race	Competition	Rider	Country	Location
January 28	Giro della Provincia di Reggio Calabria, Stage 1	UCI Europe Tour	Daniele Pietropolli (ITA)	Italy	Catanzaro
January 30	Giro della Provincia di Reggio Calabria, Overall	UCI Europe Tour	Daniele Pietropolli (ITA)	Italy	
February 19	Trofeo Laigueglia	UCI Europe Tour	Daniele Pietropolli (ITA)	Italy	Laigueglia
February 23	Giro di Sardegna, Stage 2	UCI Europe Tour	Damiano Cunego (ITA)	Italy	Nuoro
February 26	Giro di Sardegna, Stage 5	UCI Europe Tour	Michele Scarponi (ITA)	Italy	Gesturi
March 12	Tirreno–Adriatico, Stage 4	UCI World Tour	Michele Scarponi (ITA)	Italy	Chieti
March 15	Tirreno–Adriatico, Points classification	UCI World Tour	Michele Scarponi (ITA)	Italy	
March 22	Volta a Catalunya, Stage 2	UCI World Tour	Alessandro Petacchi (ITA)	Spain	Banyoles
March 25	Settimana internazionale di Coppi e Bartali, Stage 4	UCI Europe Tour	Adriano Malori (ITA)	Italy	Crevalcore
March 26	Settimana internazionale di Coppi e Bartali, Young rider classification	UCI Europe Tour	Diego Ulissi (ITA)	Italy	
April 8	Tour of the Basque Country, Stage 5	UCI World Tour	Francesco Gavazzi (ITA)	Spain	Zalla
April 10	Giro dell'Appennino	UCI Europe Tour	Damiano Cunego (ITA)	Italy	Genoa
April 22	Giro del Trentino, Overall	UCI Europe Tour	Michele Scarponi (ITA)	Italy	
April 27	Tour of Turkey, Stage 4	UCI Europe Tour	Alessandro Petacchi (ITA)	Turkey	Pamukkale
April 28	Tour de Romandie, Stage 2	UCI World Tour	Damiano Cunego (ITA)	Switzerland	Romont
May 1	Tour of Turkey, Points classification	UCI Europe Tour	Alessandro Petacchi (ITA)	Turkey	
May 8	Giro d'Italia, Stage 2	UCI World Tour	Alessandro Petacchi (ITA)	Italy	Parma
May 25	Giro d'Italia, Stage 17	UCI World Tour	Diego Ulissi (ITA)	Italy	Tirano
May 29	Giro d'Italia, Trofeo Super Team	UCI World Tour	(Note: The riders on the squad were Michele Scarponi, Alessandro Petacchi, Marco Marzano, Diego Ulissi, Danilo Hondo, Przemysław Niemiec, Manuele Mori, Daniele Righi, and Simon Špilak)	Italy	
June 18	Tour of Slovenia, Stage 2	UCI Europe Tour	Diego Ulissi (ITA)	Slovenia	Golte
June 19	Tour of Slovenia, Overall	UCI Europe Tour	Diego Ulissi (ITA)	Slovenia	
June 19	Tour of Slovenia, Mountains classification	UCI Europe Tour	Diego Ulissi (ITA)	Slovenia	
June 19	Tour of Slovenia, Under-23 classification	UCI Europe Tour	Diego Ulissi (ITA)	Slovenia	
August 11	Volta a Portugal, Stage 6	UCI Europe Tour	Francesco Gavazzi (ITA)	Portugal	Castelo Branco
August 13	Eneco Tour, Stage 5	UCI World Tour	Matteo Bono (ITA)	Belgium	Genk
August 15	Volta a Portugal, Stage 10	UCI Europe Tour	Francesco Gavazzi (ITA)	Portugal	Lisbon
August 28	GP Ouest-France	UCI World Tour	Grega Bole (SLO)	France	Plouay
September 8	Vuelta a España, Stage 18	UCI World Tour	Francesco Gavazzi (ITA)	Spain	Noja
