= 2013 Lampre–Merida season =

2013 Lampre–Merida season
Manager	Giuseppe Saronni
One-day victories	8
Stage race overall victories	2
Stage race stage victories	6
Previous season • Next season

The 2013 season for Lampre–Merida began in January at the Tour Down Under. As a UCI ProTeam, they were automatically invited and obligated to send a squad to every event in the UCI World Tour.

For the 2013 season the team changed from using Wilier bikes to Merida bikes. Although Wilier had been contracted through to the end of the 2013 season, they cited that Lampre broke the terms and conditions of the contract, and terminated their technical sponsorship.

== 2013 roster ==
As of 2 August 2013.

Rider	Date of birth
Winner Anacona (COL)	11 August 1988 (aged 24)
Niccolò Bonifazio (Note: Bonifazio joined the team on 1 August as a stagiaire, from the G.S.C. Viris Vigevano team.) (ITA)	29 October 1993 (aged 19)
Matteo Bono (ITA)	11 November 1983 (aged 29)
Enea Cambianica (Note: Cambianica joined the team on 1 August as a stagiaire, from the Maca Loca Team.) (SUI)	21 November 1989 (aged 23)
Mattia Cattaneo (ITA)	25 October 1990 (aged 22)
Davide Cimolai (ITA)	13 August 1989 (aged 23)
Valerio Conti (Note: Conti joined the team on 1 August as a stagiaire, from the Mastromarco squad.) (ITA)	30 March 1993 (aged 19)
Damiano Cunego (ITA)	19 September 1981 (aged 31)
Luca Dodi (ITA)	26 May 1987 (aged 25)
Kristijan Đurasek (CRO)	26 July 1987 (aged 25)
Elia Favilli (ITA)	31 January 1989 (aged 23)
Roberto Ferrari (ITA)	9 March 1983 (aged 29)
Massimo Graziato (ITA)	25 September 1988 (aged 24)
Matthew Lloyd (AUS)	24 May 1983 (aged 29)
Adriano Malori (ITA)	28 January 1988 (aged 24)

Rider	Date of birth
Manuele Mori (ITA)	9 August 1980 (aged 32)
Przemysław Niemiec (POL)	11 April 1980 (aged 32)
Andrea Palini (ITA)	16 June 1989 (aged 23)
Alessandro Petacchi (Note: Petacchi retired from professional cycling on 23 April.) (ITA)	3 January 1974 (aged 38)
Daniele Pietropolli (ITA)	11 July 1980 (aged 32)
Jan Polanc (Note: Polanc joined the team on 1 August, from the Radenska squad.) (SLO)	6 May 1992 (aged 20)
Filippo Pozzato (ITA)	10 September 1981 (aged 31)
Maximiliano Richeze (ARG)	7 March 1983 (aged 29)
Michele Scarponi (ITA)	25 September 1979 (aged 33)
José Serpa (COL)	17 April 1979 (aged 33)
Simone Stortoni (ITA)	7 July 1985 (aged 27)
Miguel Ubeto (Note: Ubeto was provisionally suspended for an adverse finding of GW501516. He was later banned for two years.) (VEN)	2 September 1976 (aged 36)
Diego Ulissi (ITA)	15 July 1989 (aged 23)
Davide Viganò (ITA)	12 June 1984 (aged 28)
Luca Wackermann (ITA)	13 March 1992 (aged 20)

Riders who joined the team for the 2013 season

Rider	2012 team
Mattia Cattaneo	neo-pro (stagiaire, Lampre–ISD)
Luca Dodi	Team Idea
Kristijan Đurasek	Adria Mobil
Elia Favilli	Farnese Vini–Selle Italia
Roberto Ferrari	Androni Giocattoli–Venezuela
Andrea Palini	Team Idea
Filippo Pozzato	Farnese Vini–Selle Italia
Maximiliano Richeze	Team Nippo
José Serpa	Androni Giocattoli–Venezuela
Miguel Ubeto	Androni Giocattoli–Venezuela
Luca Wackermann	neo-pro (stagiaire, Lampre–ISD)

Riders who left the team during or after the 2012 season

Rider	2013 team
Leonardo Bertagnolli	Retired
Grega Bole	Vacansoleil–DCM
Vitaliy Buts	Kolss Cycling Team
Danilo Hondo	RadioShack–Leopard
Denys Kostyuk	Kolss Cycling Team
Dmytro Krivtsov	ISD Continental Team
Yuriy Krivtsov	
Oleksandr Kvachuk	
Marco Marzano	Retired
Morris Possoni	
Daniele Righi	Retired
Oleksandr Sheydyk	ISD Continental Team
Alessandro Spezialetti	Retired

== Season victories ==
Date	Race	Competition	Rider	Country	Location
15 January	La Tropicale Amissa Bongo, Stage 2	UCI Africa Tour	Andrea Palini (ITA)	Cameroon	Yaoundé
16 February	Trofeo Laigueglia	UCI Europe Tour	Filippo Pozzato (ITA)	Italy	Laigueglia
12 March	Tirreno–Adriatico, Mountains classification	UCI World Tour	Damiano Cunego (ITA)	Italy	
21 March	Settimana Internazionale di Coppi e Bartali, Stage 2	UCI Europe Tour	Diego Ulissi (ITA)	Italy	Sogliano al Rubicone
22 March	Settimana Internazionale di Coppi e Bartali, Stage 3	UCI Europe Tour	Damiano Cunego (ITA)	Italy	Piane di Mocogno
23 March	Settimana Internazionale di Coppi e Bartali, Stage 4	UCI Europe Tour	Adriano Malori (ITA)	Italy	Crevalcore
24 March	Settimana Internazionale di Coppi e Bartali, Overall	UCI Europe Tour	Diego Ulissi (ITA)	Italy	
24 March	Settimana Internazionale di Coppi e Bartali, Points classification	UCI Europe Tour	Damiano Cunego (ITA)	Italy	
25 May	Bayern-Rundfahrt, Stage 4	UCI Europe Tour	Adriano Malori (ITA)	Germany	Schierling
26 May	Tour of Japan, Mountains classification	UCI Asia Tour	Davide Viganò (ITA)	Japan	
26 May	Bayern-Rundfahrt, Overall	UCI Europe Tour	Adriano Malori (ITA)	Germany	
26 May	Bayern-Rundfahrt, Young rider classification	UCI Europe Tour	Diego Ulissi (ITA)	Germany	
27 July	Tour de Pologne, Stage 1	UCI World Tour	Diego Ulissi (ITA)	Italy	Madonna di Campiglio
21 August	Coppa Ugo Agostoni	UCI Europe Tour	Filippo Pozzato (ITA)	Italy	Lissone
23 August	Tre Valli Varesine	UCI Europe Tour	Kristijan Đurasek (CRO)	Italy	Varese
1 September	GP Ouest-France	UCI World Tour	Filippo Pozzato (ITA)	France	Plouay
21 September	Gran Premio della Costa Etruschi	UCI Europe Tour	Michele Scarponi (ITA)	Italy	Donoratico
2 October	Milano–Torino	UCI Europe Tour	Diego Ulissi (ITA)	Italy	Turin
10 October	Coppa Sabatini	UCI Europe Tour	Diego Ulissi (ITA)	Italy	Peccioli
12 October	Giro dell'Emilia	UCI Europe Tour	Diego Ulissi (ITA)	Italy	San Luca
