= 2010 Lampre–Farnese Vini season =

2010 Lampre–Farnese Vini season
Manager	Giuseppe Saronni
One-day victories	3
Stage race overall victories	1
Stage race stage victories	16
Previous season • Next season

The 2010 season for the Lampre–Farnese Vini cycling team began in January with the Giro della Provincia di Reggio Calabria and ended in October at the Giro di Lombardia. Though the team holds a valid UCI ProTour license, they were denied ProTour registration in November 2009. The matter remained unresolved at the time of the Tour Down Under, meaning the team missed the first major race of the season, but during January the UCI issued a temporary licence as a member of the ProTour until the end of March. Full license rights were restored at the end of March.

The team's most noteworthy acquisition for the 2010 season is sprinter Alessandro Petacchi, who departed the dissolved LPR Brakes–Farnese Vini after two seasons. Three other riders from the LPR team also join Lampre in 2010, as does Petacchi's new leadout man Danilo Hondo. The team also sees the departure of some notable riders from the 2009 team, perhaps chief among them 2008 world champion Alessandro Ballan. After a lengthy search for a team, former Giro d'Italia winner and former Lampre team member Gilberto Simoni joined the team on January 13, with the understanding that the 2010 Giro would be his final race.

== 2010 roster ==
Ages as of January 1, 2010.

Rider	Date of birth
Alfredo Balloni (ITA)	September 20, 1989 (aged 20)
Lorenzo Bernucci (ITA)	September 15, 1979 (aged 30)
Emanuele Bindi (ITA)	October 7, 1981 (aged 28)
Grega Bole (SLO)	August 13, 1985 (aged 24)
Matteo Bono (ITA)	November 11, 1983 (aged 26)
Vitaliy Buts (UKR)	October 24, 1986 (aged 23)
Damiano Cunego (ITA)	September 19, 1981 (aged 28)
Mauro Da Dalto (ITA)	April 8, 1981 (aged 28)
Angelo Furlan (ITA)	June 21, 1977 (aged 32)
Francesco Gavazzi (ITA)	August 1, 1984 (aged 25)
Andrea Grendene (ITA)	April 7, 1986 (aged 23)
Danilo Hondo (GER)	January 4, 1974 (aged 35)
Andrey Kashechkin (Note: Kashechkin joined the team on July 8) (KAZ)	March 21, 1980 (aged 29)
David Loosli (SUI)	May 8, 1980 (aged 29)
Mirco Lorenzetto (ITA)	July 13, 1981 (aged 28)

Rider	Date of birth
Enrico Magazzini (ITA)	April 27, 1988 (aged 21)
Adriano Malori (ITA)	January 28, 1988 (aged 21)
Marco Marzano (ITA)	June 10, 1980 (aged 29)
Manuele Mori (ITA)	August 9, 1980 (aged 29)
Massimiliano Mori (ITA)	January 8, 1974 (aged 35)
Alessandro Petacchi (ITA)	January 3, 1974 (aged 35)
Daniele Pietropolli (ITA)	July 11, 1980 (aged 29)
Simone Ponzi (ITA)	January 17, 1987 (aged 22)
Daniele Righi (ITA)	March 28, 1976 (aged 33)
Marcin Sapa (POL)	February 10, 1976 (aged 33)
Gilberto Simoni (ITA)	August 25, 1971 (aged 38)
Alessandro Spezialetti (ITA)	January 14, 1975 (aged 34)
Simon Špilak (SLO)	June 23, 1986 (aged 23)
Diego Ulissi (ITA)	July 15, 1989 (aged 20)

Riders who joined the team for the 2010 season

Rider	2009 team
Alfredo Balloni	neo-pro
Lorenzo Bernucci	LPR Brakes–Farnese Vini
Grega Bole	Amica Chips–Knauf
Danilo Hondo	PSK Whirlpool–Author
Andrey Kashechkin	ex-pro (Astana, 2007)
Enrico Magazzini	stagiaire (Lampre–NGC)
Adriano Malori	stagiaire (Lampre–NGC)
Alessandro Petacchi	LPR Brakes–Farnese Vini
Daniele Pietropolli	LPR Brakes–Farnese Vini
Gilberto Simoni	Diquigiovanni–Androni
Alessandro Spezialetti	LPR Brakes–Farnese Vini
Diego Ulissi	neo-pro

Riders who left the team during or after the 2009 season

Rider	2010 team
Alessandro Ballan	BMC Racing Team
Marco Bandiera	Team Katusha
Marzio Bruseghin	Caisse d'Epargne
Pietro Caucchioli	Free agent
Enrico Gasparotto	Astana
Mauro Santambrogio	BMC Racing Team
Paolo Tiralongo	Astana
Volodymyr Zagorodniy	Miche

== One-day races ==
=== Spring classics ===
For the sixth consecutive season, Petacchi won the traditional one-day opener to the Italian season, the Gran Premio della Costa Etruschi. Performing his signature long, early sprint, Petacchi was delivered to the line by his leadout train just ahead of fellow Italians Alberto Loddo and Fabio Sabatini.

== Stage races ==
After missing the Tour Down Under, the team's season began with the Giro della Provincia di Reggio Calabria. Petacchi won the mass sprint finish to stage 2, getting a leadout from new teammate Hondo which delivered him to the line ahead of the rest of the peloton. He followed this up with a similar win in the race-concluding stage 4 two days later. The team was prolific in the Giro di Sardegna, winning three stages. Gavazzi won a 42-rider sprint in the first stage. The course was too selective for the team's top sprinter Petacchi, who was 16 minutes back. Petacchi won a classic field sprint in stage 3, but the team's win in stage 4 was not as typical. With another field sprint being set up, a spectator reached over a guardrail to take a picture and his arm struck Petacchi, who crashed. This happened near the front of the peloton, so most of the riders in the race went down right behind him. Hondo, who had been leading out the sprint and was just ahead of Petacchi when the crash happened, kept riding and was first across the line to win the stage. Petacchi lay on the road for over 18 minutes before getting up and finishing the stage. He was taken to the hospital for examination, but was not seriously hurt. He was able to enter the race's final stage the next day and emerge as the winner of the points classification, despite being defeated by Alberto Loddo in the sprint.

== Grand Tours ==
=== Giro d'Italia ===
Lampre entered the Giro with a squad led by Cunego. Offseason negotiations with Simoni had culminated in his signing coming with the understanding that this Giro would be the final race of his career. After a subpar Giro del Trentino, Simoni was considering pulling out of the Giro d'Italia, but he took the start in the Netherlands all the same. While Cunego again had overall victory in mind, pre-race analyses suggested he, as well as Simoni, was better off going for stage wins. Petacchi was also on the squad, aiming for wins in the flat stages.

In the Giro's first road race stage, Petacchi made a late split in the leading peloton to contest a 14-man sprint for the win, but leadout man Hondo was left behind and Petacchi managed just fifth. In stage 3, Petacchi missed an early selection and finished the stage eight minutes back. Hondo was with the leaders for another depleted sprint finish, taking fourth. Hondo was the squad's best-placed rider in the overall standings before the transfer to Italy, in 21st place. Cunego was 50th, and Simoni was 135th, already nine minutes off the pace. The squad was 13th in the stage 4 team time trial, 1'43" back of their Italian rivals Liquigas–Doimo. The next day, Petacchi was one of several sprinters upset by a three-man breakaway who stayed away to the finish line. He was third in the field sprint, but this made him only sixth on the stage. In stage 6, a solo winner took the victory more than a minute ahead of the peloton and a former breakaway companion. Hondo led the peloton across the finish line, for third on the day.

Stage 7 was a long and difficult one. The course incorporated unpaved roads toward the finish, and the day on which the stage was run happened to have heavy rainfall. This made the course very muddy and treacherous. Cunego stayed with the race's overall favorites for all of the stage. When race leader Vincenzo Nibali crashed and needed a bike change, Alexander Vinokourov, Cadel Evans, Cunego, and others broke away and left him behind. The three quickly distinguished themselves as the winning move. Cunego was the first to try to sprint for the stage win, after a hairpin left-hand turn, but Evans timed his sprint better and won, putting Cunego second on the stage. Cunego rode the Giro's first mountain stage the next day with the race's elite behind a winning breakaway. Cunego climbed Monte Terminillo with Evans, Vinokourov, Ivan Basso, and Stefano Garzelli to sixth place. Petacchi quit the race before this stage began, claiming difficulties with bronchitis and that he was unable to recover sufficiently from one day's racing to the next. Stage 10 into Bitonto featured perhaps the race's first true field sprint finish. Lacking Petacchi, Hondo rode the sprint for himself and finished eighth.

Righi nearly came to blows with Evans after stage 12. On what had seemed a straightforward sprint stage, a ten-rider breakaway including most of the Giro's overall contenders slipped away in the final kilometers and finished 10 seconds ahead of the peloton. Evans was the notable absence from the group, and had tried to pull the peloton fast enough to catch them. Righi, for his part, tried to obstructively ride a slower pace and allow Cunego, who had made the split, a better chance at the stage win. Cunego was only ninth in the sprint, and Righi and Evans were both fined after the stage by the UCI. Cunego was dropped by the race's favorites on the ascent of Monte Grappa in stage 14, and finished eighth, ceding two minutes to them. At this point, he was 15th in the standings, over 11 minutes back. Cunego was fifth on Monte Zoncolan the next day, losing a further two minutes to stage winner Basso. Cunego managed only 14th in the climbing time trial to Plan de Corones in stage 16, but managed to move into tenth overall with that result.

A big breakaway got away in stage 17. Lampre had Hondo and Marzano in this group; only the small Colnago–CSF Inox squad also had two riders make the break. The race's elite were content to let this breakaway stay away since no overall threat was represented. After a flurry of attacks and counter-attacks on the stage-concluding climb to Pejo Terme, Hondo approached the finish in the leading group with Steven Kruijswijk and Damien Monier. Monier then soloed to victory ahead of them, but Hondo beat Kruijswijk to the line for second. Cunego moved up to ninth after this stage. Stage 18 was the Giro's last straightforward sprint stage. Hondo again rode for himself in the finish, coming home fifth. Cunego had a bad day on stage 19, losing eight minutes on the Passo del Mortirolo and falling back out of the top ten. In stage 20, Simoni broke away with Bbox Bouygues Telecom's Johan Tschopp and approached the summit of the Passo di Gavia, the race's highest climb with him. Tschopp, however, easily outkicked the veteran Italian to claim the Cima Coppi. Cunego again lost time in this stage, but Righi finished the stage just seconds behind the race's elite and was ninth. Cunego finished the race the next day in 11th place overall, 17 minutes back of Giro champion Basso. The squad was 12th in the Trofeo Fast Team standings and fourth in the Trofeo Super Team. Despite several top-ten finishes, Lampre left the Giro without any victories.

=== Tour de France ===
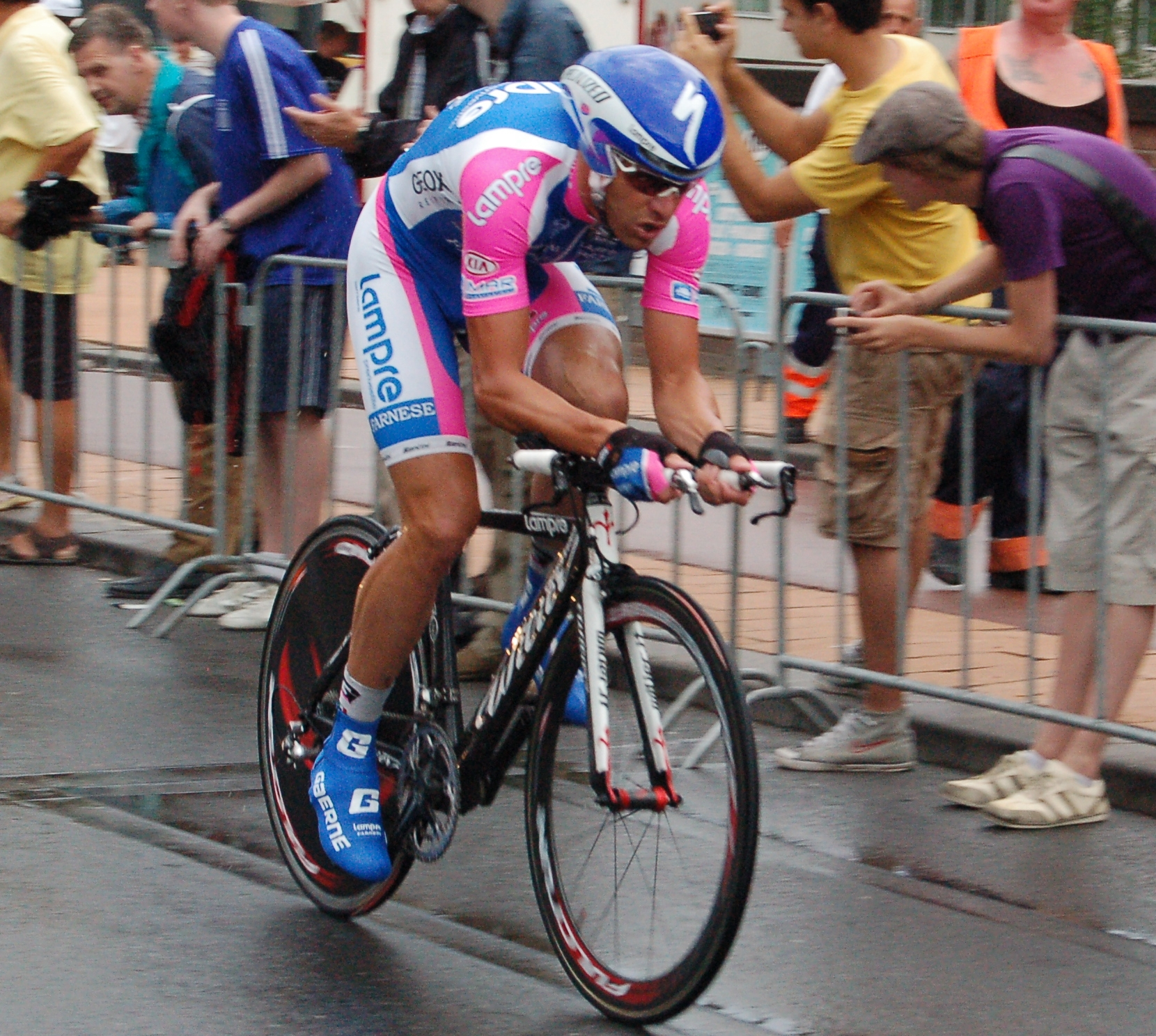
Alessandro Petacchi won the points classification in the Tour de France, by way of two stage wins and consistent high placings in other stages.

Cunego and Petacchi were again the team's squad leaders for the Tour de France. During the race, the team rode with a slightly modified name, dropping "Vini" off their jerseys to compete as "Lampre-Farnese" instead.

In the first road race stage, several crashes took place in the final kilometers, which limited the number of riders present to sprint for the stage win. Petacchi was one of only five riders who avoided being caught up in the crashes, and won the stage ahead of Mark Renshaw, Thor Hushovd, Robbie McEwen, and Mathieu Ladagnous. In stage 2, Gavazzi indirectly caused the great multitude of crashes that happened that day. A member of the morning breakaway, Gavazzi slipped on the Col du Stockeu in Spa, and as a camera bike swerved to avoid hitting him, it too crashed, causing motor oil to spill on the roadway. The oil trickled well downhill, and by the time the peloton came through about five minutes later, it was all over the road, leading to the crashes of some 60 riders from nearly every team in the race. Petacchi was again the victor in the much simpler and much safer flat stage 4. He figured into the sprint finishes to stages 5 and 6, but lost out to Mark Cavendish in both. In stage 9, Cunego, already 45 minutes down in the overall standings, made a winning breakaway. He, Sandy Casar, and Luis León Sánchez sought the stage win with Christophe Moreau, Anthony Charteau, and bridging overall favorites Alberto Contador and Andy Schleck just behind them. Casar appeared to be more familiar with the course, as he took an aggressive line on the course's final left-hand turn, with the finish line located just around that corner. He took the win, with Cunego third.

Petacchi and Hushovd spent the majority of the second half of the Tour disputing the points classification green jersey. Hushovd held it from stages three through ten, but when Petacchi finished five places higher in the stage 11 field sprint, he took it back. The next day, in a stage concluding with a climb, Hushovd made the morning breakaway and won the stage's second intermediate sprint, taking the jersey back from Petacchi. Again the next day, Petacchi finished higher in the field sprint at the finish, and again took the jersey back from Hushovd. He held it for three days, but lost it to Hushovd yet again after stage 16. Hushovd had led the peloton across the finish line for tenth on the day, while Petacchi did not cross the finish line until 28 minutes later. Neither scored points in stage 17. In stage 18, Petacchi was third and Hushovd a distant 14th, giving Petacchi the jersey once more, with a lead of 10 points with one road race stage remaining. As long as Petacchi did not finish lower than third, he was assured to win the classification. While Cavendish won the stage, Petacchi finished second to Hushovd's seventh, meaning Petacchi had won the classification and the green jersey. He became the fourth rider in history to win the points classification in all three Grand Tours for his career. The squad's highest-placed rider in the final overall standings was Cunego in 29th, at a deficit of 56 minutes and 53 seconds to Tour champion Contador. The squad was 21st in the teams classification, better only than Team Milram.

== Season victories ==
Date	Race	Competition	Rider	Country	Location
January 31	Giro della Provincia di Reggio Calabria, Stage 2	UCI Europe Tour	Alessandro Petacchi (ITA)	Italy	Crotone
February 2	Giro della Provincia di Reggio Calabria, Stage 4	UCI Europe Tour	Alessandro Petacchi (ITA)	Italy	Reggio di Calabria
February 6	Gran Premio della Costa Etruschi	UCI Europe Tour	Alessandro Petacchi (ITA)	Italy	Donoratico
February 23	Giro di Sardegna, Stage 1	UCI Europe Tour	Francesco Gavazzi (ITA)	Italy	Bornova
February 25	Giro di Sardegna, Stage 3	UCI Europe Tour	Alessandro Petacchi (ITA)	Italy	Oristano
February 25	Giro di Sardegna, Stage 4	UCI Europe Tour	Danilo Hondo (GER)	Italy	Iglesias
February 27	Giro di Sardegna, Points classification	UCI Europe Tour	Alessandro Petacchi (ITA)	Italy	
March 16	Tirreno–Adriatico, Teams classification	UCI World Ranking	(Note: The riders on the squad were Manuele Mori, Daniele Pietropolli, Simon Špilak, Lorenzo Bernucci, Mauro Da Dalto, Danilo Hondo, Alessandro Petacchi, and Francesco Gavazzi)	Italy	
April 7	Tour of the Basque Country, Stage 3	UCI ProTour	Francesco Gavazzi (ITA)	Spain	Amurrio
May 1	Tour de Romandie, Stage 4	UCI ProTour	Simon Špilak (SLO)	Switzerland	Châtel-Saint-Denis
May 2	Tour de Romandie, Overall	UCI ProTour	Simon Špilak (SLO) (Note: Špilak was originally second to Alejandro Valverde, but was upgraded to winner when all of Valverde's results from 2010 were vacated due to his suspension.)	Switzerland	
May 2	Tour de Romandie, Youth classification	UCI ProTour	Simon Špilak (SLO)	Switzerland	
May 30	Bayern-Rundfahrt, Stage 5	UCI Europe Tour	Marcin Sapa (POL)	Germany	Fürstenfeldbruck
May 30	Bayern-Rundfahrt, Youth classification	UCI Europe Tour	Adriano Malori (ITA)	Germany	
June 7	Critérium du Dauphiné, Stage 1	UCI World Ranking	Grega Bole (SLO)	France	Saint-Laurent-du-Pont
June 15	Tour de Suisse, Stage 4	UCI World Ranking	Alessandro Petacchi (ITA)	Switzerland	Wettingen
June 17	Tour of Slovenia, Stage 1	UCI Europe Tour	Grega Bole (SLO)	Slovenia	Medvode
June 18	Tour of Slovenia, Stage 2	UCI Europe Tour	Grega Bole (SLO)	Slovenia	Beljak Villach
June 20	Tour of Slovenia, Points classification	UCI Europe Tour	Grega Bole (SLO)	Slovenia	
July 4	Tour de France, Stage 1	UCI World Ranking	Alessandro Petacchi (ITA)	Belgium	Brussels
July 7	Tour de France, Stage 4	UCI World Ranking	Alessandro Petacchi (ITA)	France	Reims
July 25	Tour de France, Points classification	UCI World Ranking	Alessandro Petacchi (ITA)	France	
August 4	Tour de Pologne, Stage 4	UCI ProTour	Mirco Lorenzetto (ITA)	Poland	Cieszyn
August 18	Coppa Ugo Agostoni	UCI Europe Tour	Francesco Gavazzi (ITA)	Italy	Lissone
September 3	Vuelta a España, Stage 7	UCI World Ranking	Alessandro Petacchi (ITA)	Spain	Orihuela
September 19	Gran Premio Industria e Commercio di Prato	UCI Europe Tour	Diego Ulissi (ITA)	Italy	Prato
