= 2012 Lampre–ISD season =

2012 Lampre–ISD season
Manager	Roberto Damiani
One-day victories	1
Stage race overall victories	–
Stage race stage victories	6
Previous season • Next season

The 2012 season for Lampre–ISD began in January at the Tour Down Under. As a UCI ProTeam, they were automatically invited and obligated to send a squad to every event in the UCI World Tour.

== 2012 roster ==
Ages as of 1 January 2012.

Rider	Date of birth
Winner Anacona (COL)	11 August 1988 (aged 23)
Leonardo Bertagnolli (Note: Bertagnolli retired from the sport on 24 June, after competing in the Italian National Championships.) (ITA)	8 January 1978 (aged 33)
Grega Bole (SLO)	13 August 1985 (aged 26)
Matteo Bono (ITA)	11 November 1983 (aged 28)
Vitaliy Buts (UKR)	24 October 1986 (aged 25)
Mattia Cattaneo (Note: Cattaneo joined the team on 1 August, as a stagiaire, from U.C. Trevigiani–Dynamon–Bottoli.) (ITA)	25 October 1990 (aged 21)
Davide Cimolai (ITA)	13 August 1989 (aged 22)
Damiano Cunego (ITA)	19 September 1981 (aged 30)
Massimo Graziato (ITA)	25 September 1988 (aged 23)
Danilo Hondo (GER)	4 January 1974 (aged 37)
Denys Kostyuk (UKR)	13 March 1982 (aged 29)
Dmytro Krivtsov (UKR)	3 April 1985 (aged 26)
Yuriy Krivtsov (FRA)	7 February 1979 (aged 32)
Oleksandr Kvachuk (UKR)	23 July 1983 (aged 28)
Matthew Lloyd (AUS)	24 May 1983 (aged 28)

Rider	Date of birth
Adriano Malori (ITA)	28 January 1988 (aged 23)
Marco Marzano (ITA)	10 June 1980 (aged 31)
Manuele Mori (ITA)	9 August 1980 (aged 31)
Przemysław Niemiec (POL)	11 April 1980 (aged 31)
Alessandro Petacchi (ITA)	3 January 1974 (aged 37)
Daniele Pietropolli (ITA)	11 July 1980 (aged 31)
Morris Possoni (ITA)	1 July 1984 (aged 27)
Daniele Righi (ITA)	28 March 1976 (aged 35)
Michele Scarponi (ITA)	25 September 1979 (aged 32)
Oleksandr Sheydyk (UKR)	13 September 1980 (aged 31)
Alessandro Spezialetti (ITA)	14 January 1975 (aged 36)
Simone Stortoni (ITA)	7 July 1985 (aged 26)
Diego Ulissi (ITA)	15 July 1989 (aged 22)
Davide Viganò (ITA)	12 June 1984 (aged 27)
Michele Viola (Note: Viola joined the team on 1 August, as a stagiaire, from Farnese Vini-D'Angelo & Antenucci-MCipollini.) (ITA)	24 March 1992 (aged 19)
Luca Wackermann (Note: Wackermann joined the team on 1 August, as a stagiaire, from Mastromarco.) (ITA)	13 March 1992 (aged 19)

Riders who joined the team for the 2012 season

Rider	2011 team
Simone Stortoni	Colnago–CSF Inox
Davide Viganò	Leopard Trek
Morris Possoni	Team Sky
Massimo Graziato	stagiaire (Lampre–ISD)
Winner Anacona	neo-pro (Caparrini Le Village Vibert)
Matthew Lloyd	Omega Pharma–Lotto
Davide Cimolai	Liquigas–Cannondale
Yuriy Krivtsov	Ag2r–La Mondiale
Oleksandr Sheydyk	ISD Continental

Riders who left the team during or after the 2011 season

Rider	2012 team
Andrey Kashechkin	Astana
Francesco Gavazzi	Astana
Aitor Pérez	None
Simon Špilak	Team Katusha
Alfredo Balloni	Farnese Vini–Selle Italia
Vitaly Kondrut	Kolss Cycling Team
David Loosli	Retired
Enrico Magazzini	None
Bálint Szeghalmi	None

== Season victories ==
Date	Race	Competition	Rider	Country	Location
22 March	Settimana internazionale di Coppi e Bartali, Stage 3	UCI Europe Tour	Diego Ulissi (ITA)	Italy	Levizzano
23 March	Settimana internazionale di Coppi e Bartali, Stage 4	UCI Europe Tour	Diego Ulissi (ITA)	Italy	Pavullo
24 March	Settimana internazionale di Coppi e Bartali, Points classification	UCI Europe Tour	Diego Ulissi (ITA)	Italy	
24 March	Settimana internazionale di Coppi e Bartali, Young rider classification	UCI Europe Tour	Diego Ulissi (ITA)	Italy	
18 April	Giro del Trentino, Stage 2	UCI Europe Tour	Damiano Cunego (ITA)	Italy	Sant'Orsola Terme
23 May	Bayern-Rundfahrt, Stage 1	UCI Europe Tour	Alessandro Petacchi (ITA)	Germany	Penzberg
25 May	Bayern-Rundfahrt, Stage 3	UCI Europe Tour	Alessandro Petacchi (ITA)	Germany	Treuchtlingen
27 May	Giro d'Italia, Trofeo Fast Team	UCI World Tour	(Note: The riders on the squad were Michele Scarponi, Damiano Cunego, Diego Ulissi, Matteo Bono, Adriano Malori, Przemysław Niemiec, Daniele Pietropolli, Daniele Righi and Alessandro Spezialetti)	Italy	
27 May	Bayern-Rundfahrt, Stage 5	UCI Europe Tour	Alessandro Petacchi (ITA)	Germany	Bamberg
27 May	Bayern-Rundfahrt, Sprints classification	UCI Europe Tour	Alessandro Petacchi (ITA)	Germany	
23 August	Gran Premio Industria e Commercio Artigianato Carnaghese	UCI Europe Tour	Diego Ulissi (ITA)	Italy	Carnago
