= List of teams and cyclists in the 2012 Giro d'Italia =

All 18 UCI ProTeams are invited automatically and obligated to attend, with nine cyclists per team. Four UCI Professional Continental teams were also invited - Androni Giocattoli–Venezuela, Colnago–CSF Bardiani, Farnese Vini–Selle Italia and Team NetApp.

The cyclists will wear numbers from 1 to 219; the first team is to have numbers 1 to 9, the second team 11 to 19, etc. The exception to this rule will be the Orica–GreenEDGE team, who will use numbers 100 to 107 and 109. 108 has been withdrawn by the organisers in memory of Wouter Weylandt who was wearing 108 when he suffered a fatal accident in the 2011 race.

== By rider ==
Legend
No.	Starting number worn by the rider during the Giro
Pos.	Position in the general classification
†	Denotes riders born on or after 1 January 1987 eligible for the Young rider classification
A pink jersey	Denotes the winner of the General classification
A red jersey	Denotes the winner of the Points classification
A blue jersey	Denotes the winner of the Mountains classification
A white jersey	Denotes the winner of the Young rider classification (eligibility indicated by †)
DNS	Denotes a rider who did not start, followed by the stage before which he withdrew
DNF	Denotes a rider who did not finish, followed by the stage in which he withdrew
HD	Denotes a rider who failed to finish within the time limit, followed by the stage in which this occurred
DSQ	Denotes a rider who was disqualified from the race, followed by the stage during which this occurred
Age correct as of 5 May 2012, the date on which the Giro began

No.	Name	Nationality	Team	Age	Position
1	Michele Scarponi	Italy	Lampre–ISD	32	4
2	Damiano Cunego	Italy	Lampre–ISD	30	6
3	Diego Ulissi †	Italy	Lampre–ISD	22	21
4	Matteo Bono	Italy	Lampre–ISD	28	99
5	Adriano Malori †	Italy	Lampre–ISD	24	68
6	Przemysław Niemiec	Poland	Lampre–ISD	32	39
7	Daniele Pietropolli	Italy	Lampre–ISD	31	91
8	Daniele Righi	Italy	Lampre–ISD	36	101
9	Alessandro Spezialetti	Italy	Lampre–ISD	37	77
11	John Gadret	France	Ag2r–La Mondiale	33	11
12	Manuel Belletti	Italy	Ag2r–La Mondiale	26	DNF-15
13	Julien Bérard †	France	Ag2r–La Mondiale	24	110
14	Guillaume Bonnafond †	France	Ag2r–La Mondiale	24	90
15	Hubert Dupont	France	Ag2r–La Mondiale	31	16
16	Ben Gastauer †	Luxembourg	Ag2r–La Mondiale	24	67
17	Gregor Gazvoda	Slovenia	Ag2r–La Mondiale	30	134
18	Matteo Montaguti	Italy	Ag2r–La Mondiale	28	81
19	Mathieu Perget	France	Ag2r–La Mondiale	27	53
21	José Rujano	Venezuela	Androni Giocattoli–Venezuela	30	DNF-19
22	José Serpa	Colombia	Androni Giocattoli–Venezuela	33	87
23	Emanuele Sella	Italy	Androni Giocattoli–Venezuela	31	45
24	Roberto Ferrari	Italy	Androni Giocattoli–Venezuela	29	147
25	Fabio Felline †	Italy	Androni Giocattoli–Venezuela	22	50
26	Alessandro De Marchi	Italy	Androni Giocattoli–Venezuela	25	98
27	Miguel Ángel Rubiano	Colombia	Androni Giocattoli–Venezuela	27	62
28	Carlos José Ochoa	Venezuela	Androni Giocattoli–Venezuela	31	DNS-18
29	Jackson Rodríguez	Venezuela	Androni Giocattoli–Venezuela	27	49
31	Roman Kreuziger	Czech Republic	Astana	25	15
32	Enrico Gasparotto	Italy	Astana	30	66
33	Paolo Tiralongo	Italy	Astana	34	23
34	Simone Ponzi	Italy	Astana	25	88
35	Alexsandr Dyachenko	Kazakhstan	Astana	28	119
36	Andrey Zeits	Kazakhstan	Astana	25	85
37	Kevin Seeldraeyers	Belgium	Astana	25	33
38	Evgeni Petrov	Russia	Astana	33	61
39	Tanel Kangert †	Estonia	Astana	25	26
41	Thor Hushovd	Norway	BMC Racing Team	34	DNF-6
42	Alessandro Ballan	Italy	BMC Racing Team	32	103
43	Mathias Frank	Switzerland	BMC Racing Team	25	83
44	Taylor Phinney †	United States	BMC Racing Team	21	155
45	Marco Pinotti	Italy	BMC Racing Team	36	41
46	Mauro Santambrogio	Italy	BMC Racing Team	27	86
47	Ivan Santaromita	Italy	BMC Racing Team	28	52
48	Johann Tschopp	Switzerland	BMC Racing Team	29	14
49	Danilo Wyss	Switzerland	BMC Racing Team	26	82
51	Domenico Pozzovivo	Italy	Colnago–CSF Bardiani	29	8
52	Sacha Modolo †	Italy	Colnago–CSF Bardiani	24	138
53	Enrico Battaglin †	Italy	Colnago–CSF Bardiani	22	74
54	Gianluca Brambilla †	Italy	Colnago–CSF Bardiani	24	13
55	Stefano Pirazzi †	Italy	Colnago–CSF Bardiani	25	46
56	Sonny Colbrelli †	Italy	Colnago–CSF Bardiani	21	100
57	Stefano Locatelli †	Italy	Colnago–CSF Bardiani	23	DNS-16
58	Angelo Pagani †	Italy	Colnago–CSF Bardiani	23	97
59	Marco Coledan †	Italy	Colnago–CSF Bardiani	23	153
61	Mikel Nieve	Spain	Euskaltel–Euskadi	27	10
62	Adrián Sáez	Spain	Euskaltel–Euskadi	26	156
63	Jon Izagirre †	Spain	Euskaltel–Euskadi	23	48
64	Miguel Mínguez †	Spain	Euskaltel–Euskadi	23	157
65	Pierre Cazaux	France	Euskaltel–Euskadi	27	123
66	Víctor Cabedo †	Spain	Euskaltel–Euskadi	22	129
67	Iván Velasco	Spain	Euskaltel–Euskadi	32	DSQ-20
68	Amets Txurruka	Spain	Euskaltel–Euskadi	29	42
69	Juan José Oroz	Spain	Euskaltel–Euskadi	31	51
71	Filippo Pozzato	Italy	Farnese Vini–Selle Italia	30	DNS-10
72	Oscar Gatto	Italy	Farnese Vini–Selle Italia	27	113
73	Francesco Failli	Italy	Farnese Vini–Selle Italia	28	58
74	Matteo Rabottini †	Italy	Farnese Vini–Selle Italia	24	60
75	Andrea Guardini †	Italy	Farnese Vini–Selle Italia	22	DSQ-20
76	Elia Favilli †	Italy	Farnese Vini–Selle Italia	23	DNS-19
77	Pierpaolo De Negri	Italy	Farnese Vini–Selle Italia	25	120
78	Luca Mazzanti	Italy	Farnese Vini–Selle Italia	38	116
79	Alfredo Balloni†	Italy	Farnese Vini–Selle Italia	22	DNS-19
81	Sandy Casar	France	FDJ–BigMat	33	25
82	Mickaël Delage	France	FDJ–BigMat	26	144
83	Arnaud Démare †	France	FDJ–BigMat	20	DNF-14
84	William Bonnet	France	FDJ–BigMat	29	DNS-12
85	Francis Mourey	France	FDJ–BigMat	31	78
86	Geoffrey Soupe †	France	FDJ–BigMat	24	76
87	Gabriel Rasch	Norway	FDJ–BigMat	36	151
88	Dominique Rollin	Canada	FDJ–BigMat	29	DSQ-20
89	Jussi Veikkanen	Finland	FDJ–BigMat	31	146
91	Tyler Farrar	United States	Garmin–Barracuda	27	DNF-6
92	Sébastien Rosseler	Belgium	Garmin–Barracuda	30	125
93	Jack Bauer	New Zealand	Garmin–Barracuda	27	114
94	Ramūnas Navardauskas †	Lithuania	Garmin–Barracuda	24	137
95	Ryder Hesjedal	Canada	Garmin–Barracuda	31	1
96	Robert Hunter	South Africa	Garmin–Barracuda	35	DSQ-20
97	Alex Rasmussen	Denmark	Garmin–Barracuda	27	150
98	Peter Stetina †	United States	Garmin–Barracuda	24	27
99	Christian Vande Velde	United States	Garmin–Barracuda	35	22
100	Matthew Goss	Australia	Orica–GreenEDGE	25	DNS-14
101	Fumiyuki Beppu	Japan	Orica–GreenEDGE	29	121
102	Jack Bobridge †	Australia	Orica–GreenEDGE	22	DNF-20
103	Daryl Impey	South Africa	Orica–GreenEDGE	27	DNS-17
104	Jens Keukeleire †	Belgium	Orica–GreenEDGE	23	127
105	Brett Lancaster	Australia	Orica–GreenEDGE	32	DNS-14
106	Christian Meier	Canada	Orica–GreenEDGE	26	135
107	Svein Tuft	Canada	Orica–GreenEDGE	34	148
109	Tomas Vaitkus	Lithuania	Orica–GreenEDGE	30	DNF-17
111	Joaquim Rodríguez	Spain	Team Katusha	32	2
112	Pavel Brutt	Russia	Team Katusha	30	95
113	Mikhail Ignatiev	Russia	Team Katusha	26	143
114	Alexander Kristoff †	Norway	Team Katusha	24	149
115	Aleksandr Kuschynski	Belarus	Team Katusha	32	118
116	Alberto Losada	Spain	Team Katusha	30	54
117	Daniel Moreno	Spain	Team Katusha	30	20
118	Gatis Smukulis †	Latvia	Team Katusha	25	84
119	Ángel Vicioso	Spain	Team Katusha	35	69
121	Ivan Basso	Italy	Liquigas–Cannondale	34	5
122	Valerio Agnoli	Italy	Liquigas–Cannondale	27	57
123	Maciej Bodnar	Poland	Liquigas–Cannondale	27	117
124	Eros Capecchi	Italy	Liquigas–Cannondale	25	37
125	Damiano Caruso †	Italy	Liquigas–Cannondale	24	24
126	Paolo Longo Borghini	Italy	Liquigas–Cannondale	31	108
127	Cristiano Salerno	Italy	Liquigas–Cannondale	27	105
128	Sylwester Szmyd	Poland	Liquigas–Cannondale	34	28
129	Fabio Sabatini	Italy	Liquigas–Cannondale	27	79
131	Bart De Clercq	Belgium	Lotto–Belisol	25	40
132	Brian Bulgac †	Netherlands	Lotto–Belisol	24	102
133	Francis De Greef	Belgium	Lotto–Belisol	27	19
134	Lars Bak	Denmark	Lotto–Belisol	31	72
135	Gaetan Bille †	Belgium	Lotto–Belisol	23	DNF-17
136	Adam Hansen	Australia	Lotto–Belisol	30	94
137	Olivier Kaisen	Belgium	Lotto–Belisol	29	142
138	Gianni Meersman	Belgium	Lotto–Belisol	26	DNF-7
139	Dennis Vanendert †	Belgium	Lotto–Belisol	23	133
141	Giovanni Visconti	Italy	Movistar Team	29	DNF-15
142	Marzio Bruseghin	Italy	Movistar Team	37	17
143	José Herrada	Spain	Movistar Team	26	44
144	Beñat Intxausti	Spain	Movistar Team	26	38
145	Pablo Lastras	Spain	Movistar Team	36	DNF-6
146	Andrey Amador	Costa Rica	Movistar Team	25	29
147	Sergio Pardilla	Spain	Movistar Team	28	18
148	Branislau Samoilau	Belarus	Movistar Team	26	43
149	Francisco Ventoso	Spain	Movistar Team	29	92
151	Dario Cataldo	Italy	Omega Pharma–Quick-Step	27	12
152	Marco Bandiera	Italy	Omega Pharma–Quick-Step	27	140
153	Francesco Chicchi	Italy	Omega Pharma–Quick-Step	31	DNF-19
154	Michał Gołaś	Poland	Omega Pharma–Quick-Step	28	93
155	Nikolas Maes	Belgium	Omega Pharma–Quick-Step	26	106
156	Serge Pauwels	Belgium	Omega Pharma–Quick-Step	28	47
157	Michał Kwiatkowski †	Poland	Omega Pharma–Quick-Step	21	136
158	Martin Velits	Slovakia	Omega Pharma–Quick-Step	27	DNS-18
159	Julien Vermote †	Belgium	Omega Pharma–Quick-Step	22	89
161	Mark Renshaw	Australia	Rabobank	29	DNS-14
162	Juan Manuel Gárate	Spain	Rabobank	36	59
163	Theo Bos	Netherlands	Rabobank	28	DNS-17
164	Tom Leezer	Netherlands	Rabobank	26	DNF-11
165	Stef Clement	Netherlands	Rabobank	29	71
166	Grischa Niermann	Germany	Rabobank	36	55
167	Tom-Jelte Slagter †	Netherlands	Rabobank	22	30
168	Graeme Brown	Australia	Rabobank	33	DNF-15
169	Dennis van Winden †	Netherlands	Rabobank	24	DNF-8
171	Fränk Schleck	Luxembourg	RadioShack–Nissan	32	DNF-15
172	Jan Bakelants	Belgium	RadioShack–Nissan	26	34
173	Daniele Bennati	Italy	RadioShack–Nissan	31	DNS-8
174	Ben Hermans	Belgium	RadioShack–Nissan	25	73
175	Giacomo Nizzolo †	Italy	RadioShack–Nissan	23	130
176	Nelson Oliveira †	Portugal	RadioShack–Nissan	23	64
177	Thomas Rohregger	Austria	RadioShack–Nissan	29	31
178	Jesse Sergent †	New Zealand	RadioShack–Nissan	23	139
179	Oliver Zaugg	Switzerland	RadioShack–Nissan	30	56
181	Mark Cavendish	Great Britain	Team Sky	26	145
182	Bernhard Eisel	Austria	Team Sky	31	152
183	Juan Antonio Flecha	Spain	Team Sky	34	36
184	Sergio Henao †	Colombia	Team Sky	24	9
185	Peter Kennaugh †	Great Britain	Team Sky	22	DNF-17
186	Ian Stannard †	Great Britain	Team Sky	24	132
187	Jeremy Hunt	Great Britain	Team Sky	38	DNS-15
188	Geraint Thomas	Great Britain	Team Sky	25	80
189	Rigoberto Urán †	Colombia	Team Sky	25	7
191	Cesare Benedetti †	Italy	Team NetApp	24	107
192	Jan Bárta	Czech Republic	Team NetApp	27	65
193	Timon Seubert †	Germany	Team NetApp	25	DNF-20
194	Andreas Schillinger	Germany	Team NetApp	28	154
195	Bartosz Huzarski	Poland	Team NetApp	31	70
196	Reto Hollenstein	Switzerland	Team NetApp	26	DNF-13
197	Andreas Dietziker	Switzerland	Team NetApp	29	109
198	Matthias Brändle †	Austria	Team NetApp	22	111
199	Daniel Schorn †	Austria	Team NetApp	23	124
201	Matteo Tosatto	Italy	Team Saxo Bank	37	104
202	Anders Lund	Denmark	Team Saxo Bank	27	112
203	Volodymir Gustov	Ukraine	Team Saxo Bank	35	63
204	Jonas Aaen Jørgensen	Denmark	Team Saxo Bank	26	141
205	Juan José Haedo	Argentina	Team Saxo Bank	31	DNS-14
206	Luke Roberts	Australia	Team Saxo Bank	35	115
207	Mads Christensen	Denmark	Team Saxo Bank	28	DNF-12
208	Manuele Boaro †	Italy	Team Saxo Bank	24	131
209	Lucas Sebastián Haedo	Argentina	Team Saxo Bank	29	128
211	Matteo Carrara	Italy	Vacansoleil–DCM	33	96
212	Thomas De Gendt	Belgium	Vacansoleil–DCM	25	3
213	Romain Feillu	France	Vacansoleil–DCM	28	DNF-6
214	Sergey Lagutin	Uzbekistan	Vacansoleil–DCM	31	32
215	Gustav Larsson	Sweden	Vacansoleil–DCM	31	35
216	Tomasz Marczyński	Poland	Vacansoleil–DCM	28	HD-12
217	Martijn Keizer †	Netherlands	Vacansoleil–DCM	24	126
218	Stefan Denifl †	Austria	Vacansoleil–DCM	24	75
219	Mirko Selvaggi	Italy	Vacansoleil–DCM	27	122

== By nationality ==
Country	No. of riders	Finishers	Stage wins
Argentina	2	1	
Australia	7	2	1 (Matthew Goss)
Austria	5	5	
Belarus	2	2	
Belgium	15	13	1 (Thomas De Gendt)
Canada	4	3	
Colombia	4	4	1 (Miguel Ángel Rubiano)
Costa Rica	1	1	1 (Andrey Amador)
Czech Republic	2	2	1 (Roman Kreuziger)
Denmark	5	4	1 (Lars Bak)
Estonia	1	1	
Finland	1	1	
France	13	10	
Germany	3	2	
Italy	58	49	6 (Paolo Tiralongo, Domenico Pozzovivo, Roberto Ferrari, Matteo Rabottini, Andrea Guardini, Marco Pinotti)
Japan	1	1	
Kazakhstan	2	2	
Latvia	1	1	
Lithuania	2	1	
Luxembourg	2	1	
Netherlands	7	4	
New Zealand	2	2	
Norway	3	2	
Poland	7	6	
Portugal	1	1	
Russia	3	3	
Slovakia	1	0	
Slovenia	1	1	
South Africa	2	0	
Spain	19	17	4 (Francisco Ventoso, Joaquim Rodríguez x2, Jon Izagirre)
Sweden	1	1	
Switzerland	6	5	
Ukraine	1	1	
Great Britain	5	3	3 (Mark Cavendish x3)
United States	4	3	1 (Taylor Phinney)
Uzbekistan	1	1	
Venezuela	3	1	
TOTAL	198	157	20
