= Seubert =

Seubert (German: East Franconian variant of Seibert) is a surname. Notable people with the surname include:

- Anneliese Seubert (born 1973), Australian model
- Moritz August Seubert (1818–1878), German botanist
- Rich Seubert (born 1979), American football player
- Timon Seubert (born 1987), German cyclist
