= Mantova doping investigation =

Investigation for doping in cycling

The Mantova doping investigation was an investigation for doping in cycling, centered on the Lampre cycling team, named after the Italian town Mariana Mantovana. In total, 32 persons were accused of trafficking, prescription, administration and use of prohibited substances; the trial concluded in 2015, when all involved cyclists were cleared of any wrongdoing or not found guilty, and only one pharmacist and one local rider were found guilty.

== History ==
In 2010, Italian newspaper La Gazzetta dello Sport reported that the Italian police were investigating doping cases that involved 54 persons in the 2008 and 2009 seasons. Following that news, Italian cyclists Alessandro Ballan and Mauro Santambrogio, who had left the Lampre team and were riding for BMC Racing Team, were temporarily pulled from racing by their teams because of this investigation.

In April 2011, a list of 32 persons that the prosecution was planning to charge was revealed. After this, Ballan and Santambrogio were again temporarily stopped from racing by their team BMC Racing Team, missing the 2011 Giro d'Italia. The Lampre–ISD team also decided to keep all riders and staff mentioned in the Mantova doping investigation out of the 2011 Giro. In May 2011, La Gazzetta Dello Sport published details from the Mantova case, including extracts of phone call transcripts where doping was discussed between riders and staff.

In July 2013, a preliminary court hearing decided that the case should proceed, with a date set for December 2013; it was then also decided that 27 persons, of which 18 riders, would be on trial.

The Italian committee CONI received documents from the prosecutor, and based on that they demanded a two year doping ban for Alessandro Ballan.

== Resulting bans ==
- Cyclist Emanuele Bindi pleaded guilty, and received a one-year ban on the preliminary hearing.
- In January 2014, CONI handed Alessandro Ballan a two-year suspension, based on the information revealed in the Mantova investigation.

== In court ==
The court case started in December 2013; it was decided that the phone taps were admissible evidence. In 2015, prosecutor dropped several charges, and accepted that there was no evidence to prove a system of organized doping within the Lampre team. The judge decided to clear all involved cyclists from the Lampre team, including Ballan whose suspension was cleared.
