= Luca Dodi =

Italian cyclist

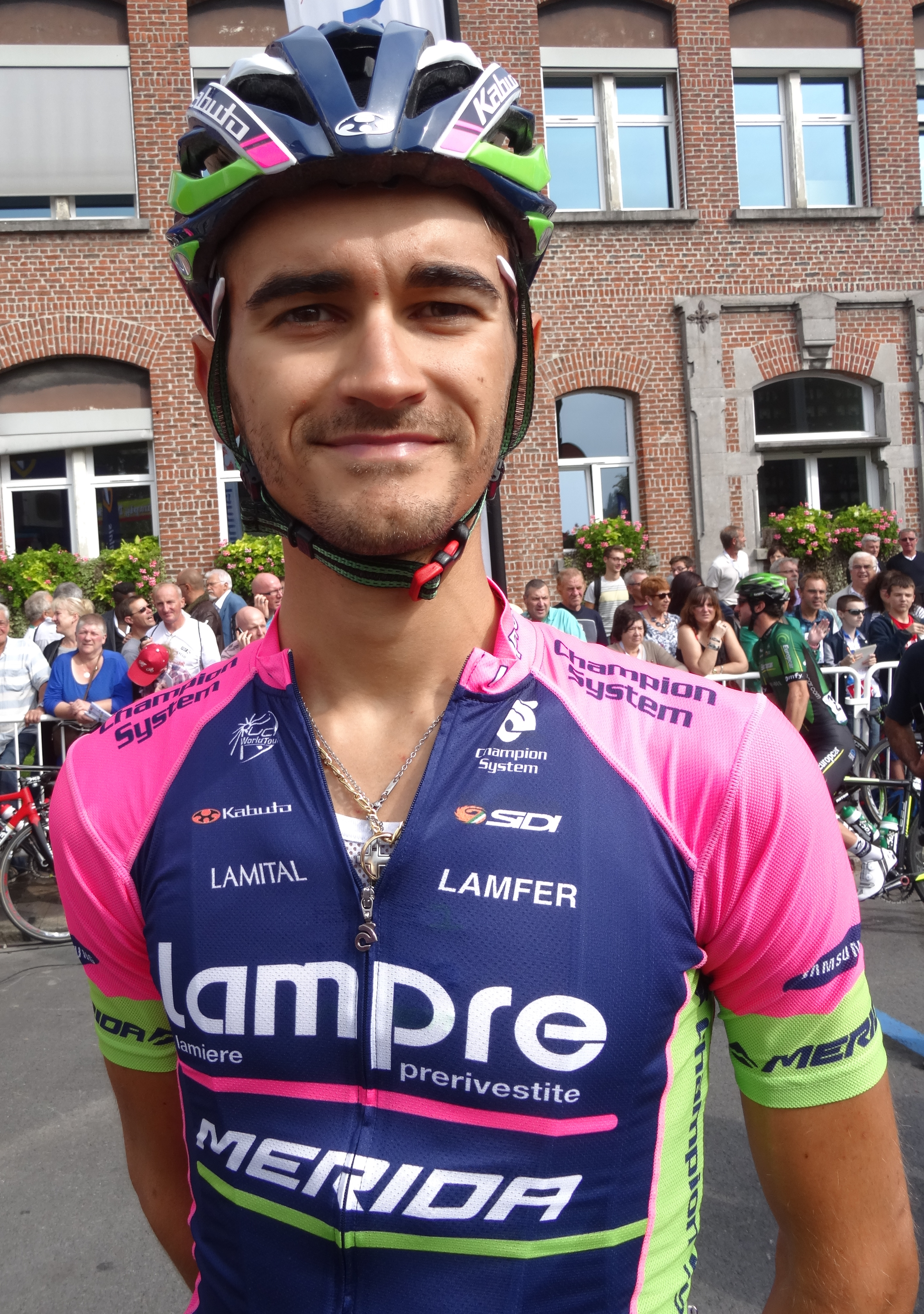

Personal information
- Born: 26 May 1987 (age 39) Parma

Cycling career
- Sport: Cycling
- Discipline: Road
- Role: Rider

Amateur teams
- 2005: V.C. Strucchi
- 2006: G.S. Podenzano
- 2007: Podenzano Italfine
- 2008: Tecninox
- 2008: Amica Chips-Knauf (trainee)
- 2009: Podenzano Tecninox
- 2010: Juvenes Steriltom
- 2011: Podenzano Tecninox

Professional teams
- 2012: Team Idea
- 2013–2014: Lampre–Merida

Luca Dodi (born 26 May 1987 in Parma, Emilia-Romagna, Italy) is an Italian former cyclist. He rode in the 2013 Vuelta a España and finished 129th overall.

== Major results ==
2007
1st Overall Giro di Romagna Ciclistico Pesche nettarine
1st Memorial Davide Fardelli
2009
1st Caduti di Soprazocco
2012
9th Coppa Placci
