= 2013 Tour Down Under =

2013 UCI World Tour, race 1 of 28

Race details
- Dates: 22–27 January 2013
- Stages: 6
- Distance: 758.5 km (471.3 mi)
- Winning time: 18h 28' 32"

Results
Jersey awarded to the overall winner	Winner	Tom-Jelte Slagter (Netherlands)	(Blanco Pro Cycling)
	Second	Javier Moreno (Spain)	(Movistar Team)
	Third	Geraint Thomas (Great Britain)	(Team Sky)
Jersey awarded to the mountains classification winner	Mountains	Javier Moreno (Spain)	(Movistar Team)
Jersey awarded to the young rider classification winner	Young rider	Tom-Jelte Slagter (Netherlands)	(Blanco Pro Cycling)
Jersey awarded to the sprints classification winner	Sprints	Geraint Thomas (Great Britain)	(Team Sky)
	Team	RadioShack–Leopard	

The 2013 Santos Tour Down Under was the 15th edition of the Tour Down Under stage race. It took place from 22 to 27 January in and around Adelaide, South Australia, and was the first race of the 2013 UCI World Tour.

The race was won by Dutch rider Tom-Jelte Slagter of the Blanco Pro Cycling team, after taking the lead on the penultimate stage of the race and holding the race leader's ochre jersey to the finish, the next day, in Adelaide. Slagter also won the third stage of the race, taking the first victories of his professional career at the race. Slagter's winning margin over runner-up Javier Moreno of the Movistar Team was 17 seconds, and Team Sky's Geraint Thomas completed the podium, 8 seconds behind Moreno and 25 seconds in arrears of Slagter. Like Slagter, Thomas won a stage of the race, winning the second stage and held the race lead for three days.

In the race's other classifications, Slagter's overall victory ensured that he also won the black jersey for the highest placed rider under the age of 26, while Thomas won the blue jersey for the sprints classification on the final day – taking points at the intermediate sprints and the finish to displace Slagter of the jersey – to hold off Lotto–Belisol's André Greipel; Greipel won three stages during the race to surpass Robbie McEwen's previous record of most stage wins, and also picked up his 100th career victory with his final stage win. Moreno won the mountains classification, while RadioShack–Leopard won the teams classification.

== Participating teams ==
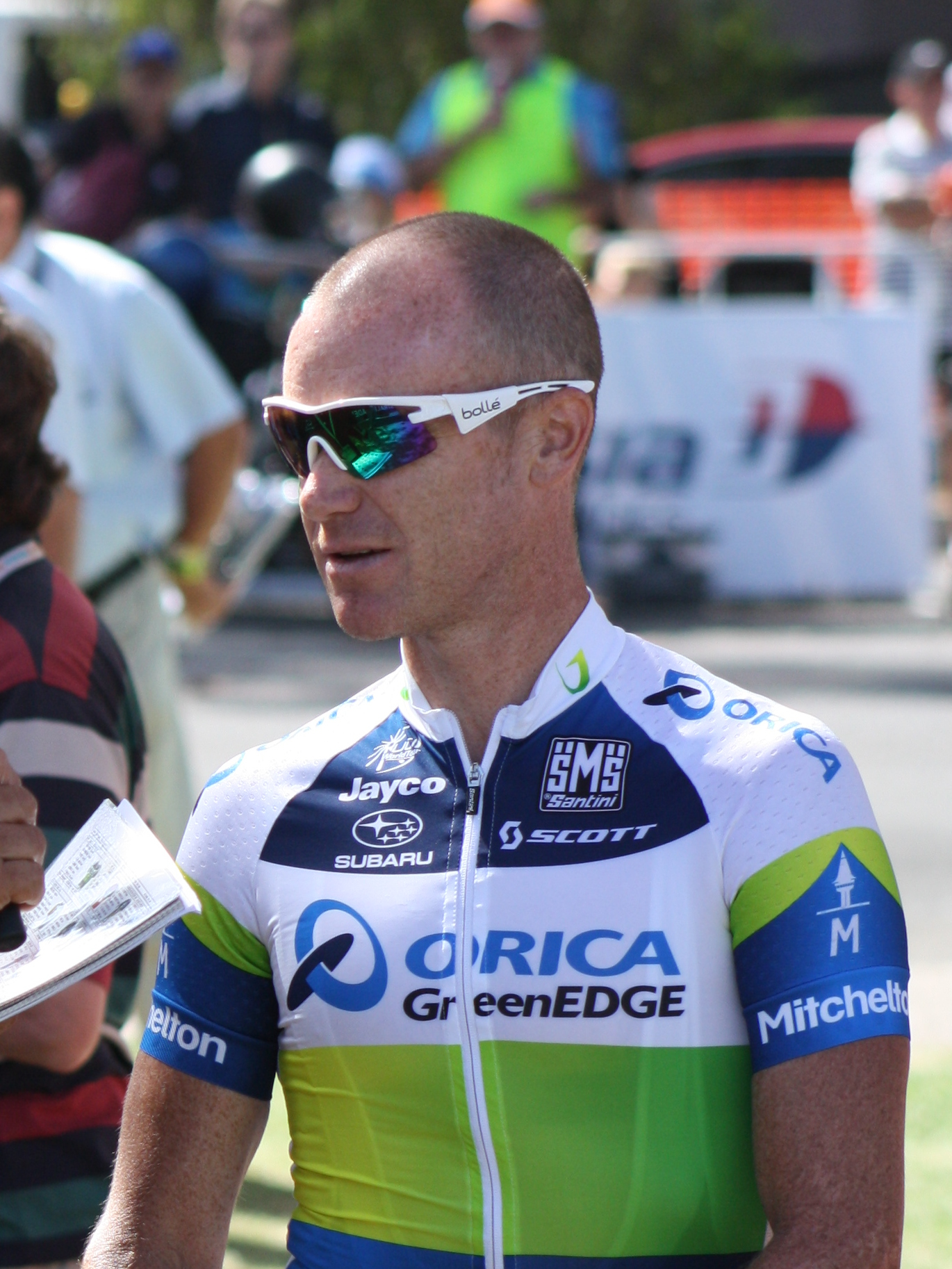
Orica–GreenEDGE rider Stuart O'Grady, winner of the race in 1999 and 2001, was one of four former Tour Down Under overall winners to compete in the 2013 edition.

As the Tour Down Under was a UCI World Tour event, all 18 UCI ProTeams at the time of the race were invited automatically and obligated to send a squad. Team Katusha was not invited, as the legal proceedings concerning their ProTour status were not resolved yet. Together with a selection of Australian riders forming the UniSA-Australia squad, this formed the event's 19-team peloton.

The 19 teams invited to the race were:

- Ag2r–La Mondiale
- Argos–Shimano
- Astana
- Blanco Pro Cycling
- BMC Racing Team
- Cannondale
- Euskaltel–Euskadi
- FDJ
- Garmin–Sharp
- Lampre–Merida
- Lotto–Belisol
- Movistar Team
- Omega Pharma–Quick-Step
- Orica–GreenEDGE
- RadioShack–Leopard
- Saxo–Tinkoff
- Team Sky
- UniSA-Australia
- Vacansoleil–DCM

Among the 133-rider start list were four previous winners of the race. Stuart O'Grady (1999 and 2001) and Simon Gerrans (2006 and 2012) were both part of the Orica–GreenEDGE line-up, 2003 winner Mikel Astarloza was part of the Euskaltel–Euskadi squad for the race, while André Greipel – another two-time winner, in 2008 and 2010 respectively – was the main sprinter for the Lotto–Belisol squad.

== Stages ==
=== Stage 1 ===
22 January 2013 — Prospect to Lobethal, 135 km (83.9 mi)

For the second successive year, the Tour Down Under started with a stage beginning in Prospect; on this occasion, an undulating 135 km (83.9 mi) parcours was scheduled for the riders, including one categorised climb – a steep, second-category ascent of Checker Hill – around a third into the stage. Three intermediate sprint points were also scheduled, as the riders completed nearly three laps of a finishing circuit around Lobethal, with the sprints each taking place in the town of Charleston. The final sprint came with around 16.5 km (10.3 mi) remaining of the stage, before leading to the uphill finish in Lobethal; where it was likely to result in a sprint finish.

On his World Tour début, the Australian under-23 champion Jordan Kerby launched a solo attack for the UniSA-Australia representative team in the early moments of the stage; he held a maximum lead of around seven minutes at one point during the stage, but was eventually caught during the second of the finishing laps around Lobethal by Omega Pharma–Quick-Step rider Jérôme Pineau. Pineau dropped Kerby not long after catching him, and accumulated a lead of 1' 15" as he started the final lap. His move was ended in Charleston, as BMC Racing Team's Philippe Gilbert moved out of the peloton to gain the three bonus seconds on offer for the first rider across the sprint line. After several late attacks were caught, the sprint trains of the Lotto–Belisol and Blanco Pro Cycling teams moved toward the front of the field. With a lead-out from Lotto–Belisol team-mates Jürgen Roelandts and Greg Henderson, André Greipel achieved a record-equalling twelfth Tour Down Under stage victory, comfortably winning the sprint ahead of Arnaud Démare (FDJ) and Blanco Pro Cycling's Mark Renshaw. As a result, Greipel picked up the ochre and blue jerseys for being the first leader of the points and general classifications.

Stage 1 Result

	Rider	Team	Time
1	André Greipel (GER)	Lotto–Belisol	3h 35' 24"
2	Arnaud Démare (FRA)	FDJ	s.t.
3	Mark Renshaw (AUS)	Blanco Pro Cycling	s.t.
4	Simone Ponzi (ITA)	Astana	s.t.
5	Steele Von Hoff (AUS)	Garmin–Sharp	s.t.
6	Roberto Ferrari (ITA)	Lampre–Merida	s.t.
7	Daniele Pietropolli (ITA)	Lampre–Merida	s.t.
8	Edvald Boasson Hagen (NOR)	Team Sky	s.t.
9	José Joaquín Rojas (ESP)	Movistar Team	s.t.
10	Zak Dempster (AUS)	UniSA-Australia	s.t.

General Classification after Stage 1

	Rider	Team	Time
1	André Greipel (GER)	Lotto–Belisol	3h 35' 14"
2	Arnaud Démare (FRA)	FDJ	+ 4"
3	Mark Renshaw (AUS)	Blanco Pro Cycling	+ 6"
4	Simon Gerrans (AUS)	Orica–GreenEDGE	+ 7"
5	Philippe Gilbert (BEL)	BMC Racing Team	+ 7"
6	Jérôme Pineau (FRA)	Omega Pharma–Quick-Step	+ 8"
7	Thomas De Gendt (BEL)	Vacansoleil–DCM	+ 8"
8	Simone Ponzi (ITA)	Astana	+ 9"
9	José Joaquín Rojas (ESP)	Movistar Team	+ 9"
10	Steele Von Hoff (AUS)	Garmin–Sharp	+ 10"

=== Stage 2 ===
23 January 2013 — Mount Barker to Rostrevor, 116.5 km (72.4 mi)

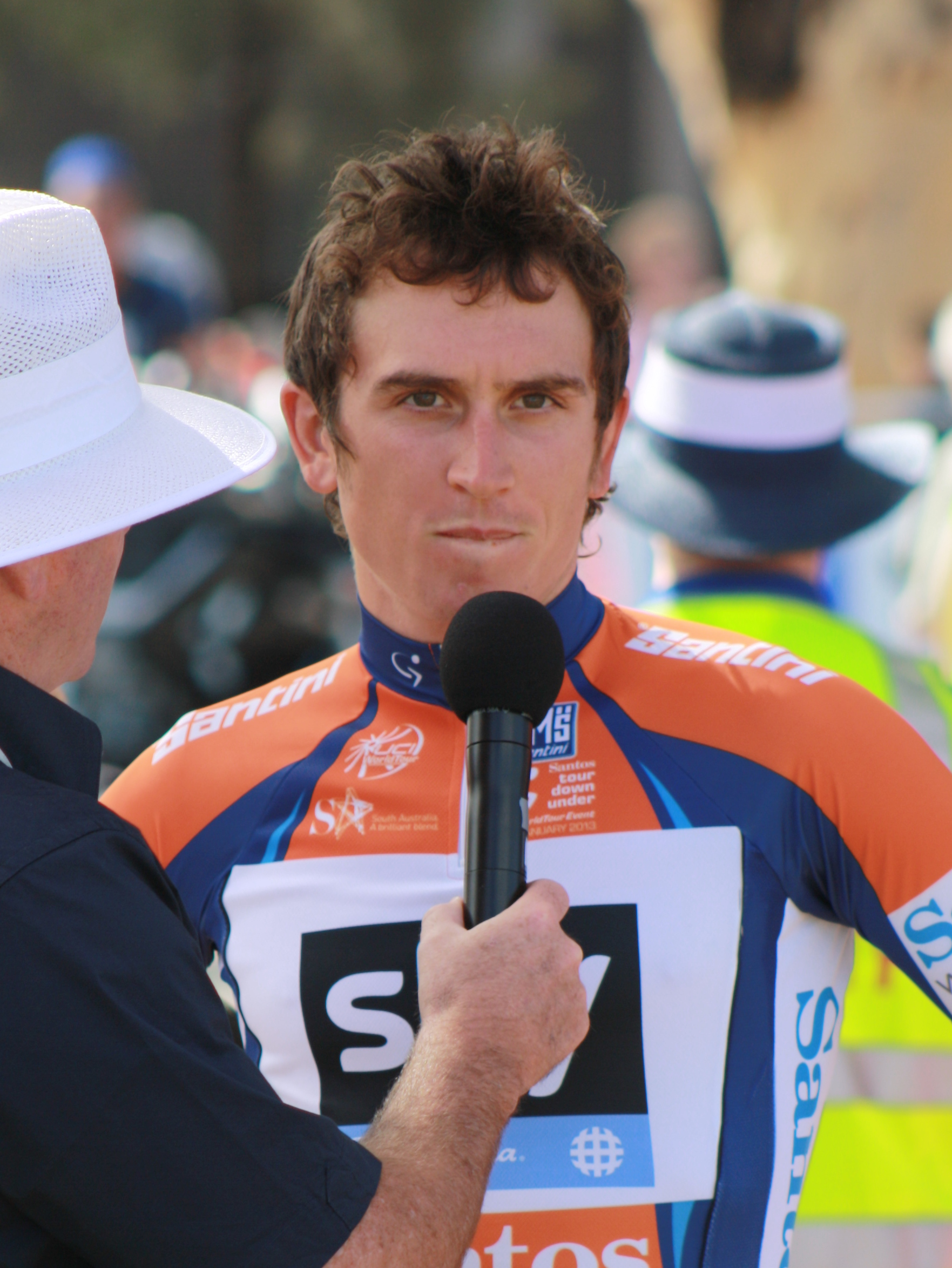
Team Sky rider Geraint Thomas (pictured before the fourth stage) fared best in the final sprint, to win the stage and assume the leader's ochre jersey.

Although relatively short at 116.5 km (72.4 mi) in length, the second stage of the Tour was undulating from the start in Mount Barker. After passing through the first sprint point in the town of Echunga, the riders had to negotiate a short loop around the Adelaide Hills, passing Hahndorf and Littlehampton on the route, before a second intermediate sprint at Oakbank. The run-in towards the finish at Rostrevor was punctuated by the day's only categorised climb, the first-category Corkscrew ascent, which made its début in the race. With parts of the climb reaching a gradient of around 17%, it was expected to significantly reduce the numbers in the peloton before the descent into Rostrevor, with sprinters not expecting to feature by the end.

A quartet of riders – UniSA-Australia's Calvin Watson, Argos–Shimano rider Will Clarke, Guillaume Bonnafond of Ag2r–La Mondiale and Saxo–Tinkoff's Christopher Juul-Jensen – made the early breakaway from the field, but were not allowed to attain a substantial advantage due to the Corkscrew and its potential to split the race apart. Clarke won both of the intermediate sprints on the route, beating Watson at the first of them and Bonnafond at the latter sprint. In the peloton, BMC Racing Team was keeping station at the front as Swiss champion Martin Kohler, who led the race overall at one point in 2012, was protecting their leader Philippe Gilbert, who had been in the top ten overall overnight after his bonus seconds gained on the opening stage. Gilbert would ultimately be one of twenty riders to crash on the descent from the Corkscrew, and rode to the finish with a broken derailleur, losing nearly three minutes.

The breakaway was gradually brought back, with Clarke remaining off the front of the main field until the foot of the Corkscrew. Several mini-attacks occurred as soon as the gradient rose, but it was not until the pre-stage favourite George Bennett (RadioShack–Leopard) made his move on the climb that an attack gained ground from the main field. Team Sky's Geraint Thomas joined him for a point on the climb, before moving further up the road, to take maximum points for the climb and the classification lead. Bennett caught up to Thomas on the descent, with his team-mate Ben Hermans and Javier Moreno of the Movistar Team also joining the duo. As the most proficient sprinter of the group, Thomas waited the longest to launch his sprint and soon sped past his rivals to take the stage victory, achieving a one-second gap in the process and the ochre jersey. Moreno and Hermans also stayed ahead of a closing eleven-rider group, while Bennett finished the stage tenth.

Stage 2 Result

	Rider	Team	Time
1	Geraint Thomas (GBR)	Team Sky	2h 44' 18"
2	Javier Moreno (ESP)	Movistar Team	+ 1"
3	Ben Hermans (BEL)	RadioShack–Leopard	+ 1"
4	Tom-Jelte Slagter (NED)	Blanco Pro Cycling	+ 4"
5	Tim Wellens (BEL)	Lotto–Belisol	+ 4"
6	Daniele Pietropolli (ITA)	Lampre–Merida	+ 4"
7	Jack Bauer (NZL)	Garmin–Sharp	+ 4"
8	Wilco Kelderman (NED)	Blanco Pro Cycling	+ 4"
9	Jon Izagirre (ESP)	Euskaltel–Euskadi	+ 4"
10	George Bennett (NZL)	RadioShack–Leopard	+ 4"

General Classification after Stage 2

	Rider	Team	Time
1	Geraint Thomas (GBR)	Team Sky	6h 19' 32"
2	Javier Moreno (ESP)	Movistar Team	+ 5"
3	Ben Hermans (BEL)	RadioShack–Leopard	+ 7"
4	Daniele Pietropolli (ITA)	Lampre–Merida	+ 14"
5	Tom-Jelte Slagter (NED)	Blanco Pro Cycling	+ 14"
6	Jon Izagirre (ESP)	Euskaltel–Euskadi	+ 14"
7	Gorka Izagirre (ESP)	Euskaltel–Euskadi	+ 14"
8	Tim Wellens (BEL)	Lotto–Belisol	+ 14"
9	Jack Bauer (NZL)	Garmin–Sharp	+ 14"
10	Tiago Machado (POR)	RadioShack–Leopard	+ 14"

=== Stage 3 ===
24 January 2013 — Unley to Stirling, 139 km (86.4 mi)

The third stage of the race was predominantly a circuit race around Stirling; just over 30 km (18.6 mi) from the start in Unley – via a second-category climb in the early kilometres of the stage, at Eagle On The Hill – the riders reached the finishing town of Stirling. From there, five laps of a 21.4 km (13.3 mi) circuit were completed – two more than the equivalent circuit around the town during the second stage of the 2012 Tour – with intermediate sprints to be contested in Heathfield on each of the first two laps. A hilly circuit was projected to reduce the numbers in any potential final sprint, although not as prominently as the previous stage. After several mini-breaks were initiated before Eagle On The Hill, leading to a 23-rider lead group for a short period, the day's breakaway was formed by a pair of riders.

Orica–GreenEDGE rider Simon Clarke was joined at the head of the race by Will Clarke – the winner in Stirling in 2012 after a stage-long breakaway – who featured in the lead for the second day running, for Argos–Shimano. The Clarkes built up a maximum lead of around three-and-a-half minutes, with Team Sky leading the peloton and protecting race leader Geraint Thomas. Thomas gained a second at the first intermediate sprint, to extend his overall lead by one second, as the Clarkes took maximum points on offer at each sprint. They were joined by six other riders, who had been a part of a 12-rider move that had broken clear of the peloton on the third lap of the circuit. The move broke down on the final lap, and after Cannondale's Cameron Wurf was caught inside the final kilometre, it ultimately set up a reduced sprint of around thirty riders. With only David Tanner as a lead-out, Blanco Pro Cycling's Tom-Jelte Slagter – the young rider classification leader – moved to the front of the line, launched his sprint early, and held off the rest of the group to take his first professional victory by a bike length, ahead of Matthew Goss (Orica–GreenEDGE) and BMC Racing Team's Philippe Gilbert. He moved into second place overall, five seconds behind Thomas, who retained the ochre jersey.

Stage 3 Result

	Rider	Team	Time
1	Tom-Jelte Slagter (NED)	Blanco Pro Cycling	3h 36' 46"
2	Matthew Goss (AUS)	Orica–GreenEDGE	s.t.
3	Philippe Gilbert (BEL)	BMC Racing Team	s.t.
4	Geraint Thomas (GBR)	Team Sky	s.t.
5	Giovanni Visconti (ITA)	Movistar Team	s.t.
6	Javier Moreno (ESP)	Movistar Team	s.t.
7	Simone Ponzi (ITA)	Astana	s.t.
8	Daniele Pietropolli (ITA)	Lampre–Merida	s.t.
9	Ivan Santaromita (ITA)	BMC Racing Team	s.t.
10	Gorka Izagirre (ESP)	Euskaltel–Euskadi	s.t.

General Classification after Stage 3

	Rider	Team	Time
1	Geraint Thomas (GBR)	Team Sky	9h 56' 17"
2	Tom-Jelte Slagter (NED)	Blanco Pro Cycling	+ 5"
3	Javier Moreno (ESP)	Movistar Team	+ 6"
4	Ben Hermans (BEL)	RadioShack–Leopard	+ 8"
5	Daniele Pietropolli (ITA)	Lampre–Merida	+ 15"
6	Jon Izagirre (ESP)	Euskaltel–Euskadi	+ 15"
7	Gorka Izagirre (ESP)	Euskaltel–Euskadi	+ 15"
8	George Bennett (NZL)	RadioShack–Leopard	+ 15"
9	Jack Bauer (NZL)	Garmin–Sharp	+ 15"
10	Wilco Kelderman (NED)	Blanco Pro Cycling	+ 15"

=== Stage 4 ===
25 January 2013 — Modbury to Tanunda, 126.5 km (78.6 mi)

The fourth stage saw the remaining riders head north-west from the start in Modbury to the eventual finish in the Barossa Valley and the town of Tanunda, for its third stage finish of the Tour in four years; on the two previous occasions, sprinters had fared best as André Greipel won the opening stage in 2010, while Óscar Freire was the victor in 2012, winning stage four. The 126.5 km (78.6 mi) itinerary, consisting of one categorised climb – a second category climb in Humbug Scrub – and two intermediate sprints once again, was exponentially suited to the sprinters and a bunch sprint was to be expected in Tanunda. Not long after the start, another two-rider breakaway of the day was formed, consisting of the reigning World Champion Philippe Gilbert of the BMC Racing Team, and Damien Howson of the UniSA-Australia representative team.

The pair built up a lead of over three minutes during the stage, but once again, the peloton did not allow for it to climb any further, to minimise the threats to the general classification. Howson took maximum points at Humbug Scrub, with Gilbert taking the honours at both intermediate sprint points in Mount Pleasant and Springton respectively. The duo remained off the front until inside the final 10 km (6.2 mi), when the sprint trains of the sprinters' teams began to move towards the front of the main field. Inside the final kilometre, six riders – including three members of the Orica–GreenEDGE squad – crashed, but all riders were able to remount and finish the stage. Lotto–Belisol led out from the front, with Greg Henderson the final man for Greipel to launch his sprint off of. Greipel ultimately won by a bike length, ahead of Lampre–Merida's Roberto Ferrari and Jonathan Cantwell of Saxo–Tinkoff, to achieve a record-breaking thirteenth stage win at the race, surpassing Robbie McEwen's previous record of twelve. None of the top ten overall were involved in the late-stage incidents, allowing Geraint Thomas (Team Sky) to maintain his overall lead.

Stage 4 Result

	Rider	Team	Time
1	André Greipel (GER)	Lotto–Belisol	3h 02' 52"
2	Roberto Ferrari (ITA)	Lampre–Merida	s.t.
3	Jonathan Cantwell (AUS)	Saxo–Tinkoff	s.t.
4	Andrew Fenn (GBR)	Omega Pharma–Quick-Step	s.t.
5	Barry Markus (NED)	Vacansoleil–DCM	s.t.
6	Marcel Kittel (GER)	Argos–Shimano	s.t.
7	Mark Renshaw (AUS)	Blanco Pro Cycling	s.t.
8	Kenny van Hummel (NED)	Vacansoleil–DCM	s.t.
9	Arnaud Démare (FRA)	FDJ	s.t.
10	Klaas Lodewyck (BEL)	BMC Racing Team	s.t.

General Classification after Stage 4

	Rider	Team	Time
1	Geraint Thomas (GBR)	Team Sky	12h 59' 09"
2	Tom-Jelte Slagter (NED)	Blanco Pro Cycling	+ 5"
3	Javier Moreno (ESP)	Movistar Team	+ 6"
4	Ben Hermans (BEL)	RadioShack–Leopard	+ 8"
5	Gorka Izagirre (ESP)	Euskaltel–Euskadi	+ 15"
6	Jon Izagirre (ESP)	Euskaltel–Euskadi	+ 15"
7	Jack Bauer (NZL)	Garmin–Sharp	+ 15"
8	Tiago Machado (POR)	RadioShack–Leopard	+ 15"
9	Adam Hansen (AUS)	Lotto–Belisol	+ 15"
10	George Bennett (NZL)	RadioShack–Leopard	+ 15"

=== Stage 5 ===
26 January 2013 — McLaren Vale to Old Willunga Hill, 151.5 km (94.1 mi)

The race's queen stage was unaltered from its 2012 iteration, for the 2013 event. From the start in McLaren Vale, the peloton covered several kilometres before reaching Willunga, and from there, riders completed three laps of a coast-side loop around Aldinga Beach and Snapper Point; both of the intermediate sprint points were held in the latter suburb, coming on the second and third laps. Upon reaching Willunga for the fourth time, the race headed in the opposite direction, and the first of two ascents of Old Willunga Hill – a 3 km (1.9 mi) long, first-category climb at an average gradient of 7.6% – on another short loop, before the summit finish. It was expected that the finish would be contested between a small group, and that the climb would crown the overall winner of the race, ahead of the final stage criterium in Adelaide.

After two earlier foiled attacks, the stage saw an eventual breakaway of seven riders, as they quickly went clear of the main field; home rider Calvin Watson (UniSA-Australia) was part of the group on Australia Day, where he was joined by Vacansoleil–DCM pairing Thomas De Gendt and Tomasz Marczyński, Jens Mouris of Orica–GreenEDGE, Argos–Shimano's Koen de Kort, Manuele Boaro (Saxo–Tinkoff) and BMC Racing Team rider Klaas Lodewyck. With de Kort being 2' 52" behind the overall leader Geraint Thomas (Team Sky), the peloton did not allow for a substantial lead to be accumulated, as the maximum time gap that the breakaway established was around four-and-a-half minutes at the midway point of the stage. Blanco Pro Cycling were prominent on the front of the group in the hope of trying to move Tom-Jelte Slagter, the young rider classification leader and second to Thomas overall, into the ochre jersey ahead of the final stage. The upped pace in the peloton spelled the end of the breakaway just as they reached Old Willunga Hill for the first time. On the climb, the Movistar Team sent two of the riders off the front in the intention of helping Javier Moreno into ochre; Eros Capecchi and José Herrada were later joined by Ag2r–La Mondiale's Guillaume Bonnafond and Lotto–Belisol rider Jürgen Roelandts.

They reached the summit of the climb with a gap of around fifteen seconds. At this point, the peloton slowed slightly to allow the lead group to extend their advantage to around forty seconds. However, they were caught on the climb to the finish, which sparked several counter-moves in the peloton; Edvald Boasson Hagen was setting the pace for Thomas, with Slagter just behind, as Moreno attacked with 1.7 km (1.1 mi) remaining. He held clear into the final kilometre, as defending overall winner Simon Gerrans (Orica–GreenEDGE) moved forward in the pack, soon breaking clear to join Moreno. Slagter made his move not long after, and Thomas could not follow, cracking with 600 metres (2,000 ft) left. Slagter and Gerrans ultimately contested a two-man sprint for the line which Gerrans narrowly won – avenging a narrow defeat to Alejandro Valverde in 2012 – while Slagter's second-place finish allowed him to take the ochre jersey ahead of Moreno, who finished the stage third, and claimed the mountains classification lead. Thomas fell to fifth overall, as RadioShack–Leopard's Ben Hermans and Jon Izagirre of Euskaltel–Euskadi moved into third and fourth respectively.

Stage 5 Result

	Rider	Team	Time
1	Simon Gerrans (AUS)	Orica–GreenEDGE	3h 36' 25"
2	Tom-Jelte Slagter (NED)	Blanco Pro Cycling	s.t.
3	Javier Moreno (ESP)	Movistar Team	+ 10"
4	Jon Izagirre (ESP)	Euskaltel–Euskadi	+ 12"
5	Tiago Machado (POR)	RadioShack–Leopard	+ 13"
6	Wilco Kelderman (NED)	Blanco Pro Cycling	+ 16"
7	Gorka Izagirre (ESP)	Euskaltel–Euskadi	+ 16"
8	Rafael Valls (ESP)	Vacansoleil–DCM	+ 16"
9	Daniele Pietropolli (ITA)	Lampre–Merida	+ 16"
10	Ben Hermans (BEL)	RadioShack–Leopard	+ 16"

General Classification after Stage 5

	Rider	Team	Time
1	Tom-Jelte Slagter (NED)	Blanco Pro Cycling	16h 35' 33"
2	Javier Moreno (ESP)	Movistar Team	+ 13"
3	Ben Hermans (BEL)	RadioShack–Leopard	+ 25"
4	Jon Izagirre (ESP)	Euskaltel–Euskadi	+ 28"
5	Geraint Thomas (GBR)	Team Sky	+ 29"
6	Tiago Machado (POR)	RadioShack–Leopard	+ 29"
7	Gorka Izagirre (ESP)	Euskaltel–Euskadi	+ 32"
8	Daniele Pietropolli (ITA)	Lampre–Merida	+ 32"
9	Wilco Kelderman (NED)	Blanco Pro Cycling	+ 32"
10	Jussi Veikkanen (FIN)	FDJ	+ 37"

=== Stage 6 ===
27 January 2013 — Adelaide (criterium), 90 km (55.9 mi)

The race finished with its now-customary criterium race around the streets of Adelaide; for the 90 km (55.9 mi) distance, a circuit of 4.5 km (2.8 mi) was completed twenty times, with several passages through the finish line counting towards the sub-classifications for sprints and the mountains. With Team Sky looking to move Geraint Thomas back onto the final overall podium, any attempts at a breakaway were quickly shut down and no move garnered more than thirty seconds of a time gap. Thus, at the first intermediate sprint point at the end of the eighth lap, Thomas sprinted for bonus seconds and after help from Edvald Boasson Hagen, he won the sprint to accumulate three seconds back. Thomas took a further second at the second sprint, won by Boasson Hagen, to move nearer the top placings.

Ultimately, the race came down to the final sprint where André Greipel (Lotto–Belisol) took his third win of the race, and the 100th victory of his professional career. He was followed across the line by Mark Renshaw of the Blanco Pro Cycling team and Boasson Hagen completed a strong day for himself with third place. A sixth-place finish for Thomas, combined with points achieved at the earlier intermediate sprints, allowed him to take the sprints classification ahead of Greipel; his stage performance was also rewarded with the most combative rider of the day honours. A small time gap also allowed him to finish third overall, with Euskaltel–Euskadi's Jon Izagirre also moving ahead of RadioShack–Leopard rider Ben Hermans in the final standings. Renshaw's team-mate Tom-Jelte Slagter finished in the same time as Greipel, to achieve his first overall victory as a professional – becoming the first Dutchman to win the race – extending his winning margin over Javier Moreno (Movistar Team) to 17 seconds, after Moreno finished four seconds behind.

Stage 6 Result

	Rider	Team	Time
1	André Greipel (GER)	Lotto–Belisol	1h 52' 59"
2	Mark Renshaw (AUS)	Blanco Pro Cycling	s.t.
3	Edvald Boasson Hagen (NOR)	Team Sky	s.t.
4	Matthew Goss (AUS)	Orica–GreenEDGE	s.t.
5	Tyler Farrar (USA)	Garmin–Sharp	s.t.
6	Geraint Thomas (GBR)	Team Sky	s.t.
7	Klaas Lodewyck (BEL)	BMC Racing Team	s.t.
8	Barry Markus (NED)	Vacansoleil–DCM	s.t.
9	Yauheni Hutarovich (BLR)	Ag2r–La Mondiale	s.t.
10	Kenny van Hummel (NED)	Vacansoleil–DCM	s.t.

Final General Classification

	Rider	Team	Time
1	Tom-Jelte Slagter (NED)	Blanco Pro Cycling	18h 28' 32"
2	Javier Moreno (ESP)	Movistar Team	+ 17"
3	Geraint Thomas (GBR)	Team Sky	+ 25"
4	Jon Izagirre (ESP)	Euskaltel–Euskadi	+ 32"
5	Ben Hermans (BEL)	RadioShack–Leopard	+ 34"
6	Wilco Kelderman (NED)	Blanco Pro Cycling	+ 34"
7	Gorka Izagirre (ESP)	Euskaltel–Euskadi	+ 36"
8	Daniele Pietropolli (ITA)	Lampre–Merida	+ 36"
9	Tiago Machado (POR)	RadioShack–Leopard	+ 38"
10	Jussi Veikkanen (FIN)	FDJ	+ 41"

== Classification leadership table ==
In the 2013 Tour Down Under, four different jerseys were awarded. For the general classification, calculated by adding each cyclist's finishing times on each stage, the leader received an ochre jersey. This classification was considered the most important of the 2013 Tour Down Under, and the winner of the classification was considered the winner of the race.

Additionally, there was a sprints classification, which awarded a blue jersey. In the sprints classification, cyclists received points for finishing in the top 15 in a stage. For winning a stage, a rider earned 15 points, with one point fewer per place down to a single point for 15th place. Points towards the classification could also be accrued at intermediate sprint points during each stage; these intermediate sprints also offered bonus seconds towards the general classification. There was also a mountains classification, the leadership of which was marked by a white jersey. In the mountains classification, points were won by reaching the top of a climb before other cyclists, with more points available for the higher-categorised climbs.

The fourth jersey represented the young rider classification, marked by a black jersey. This was decided in the same way as the general classification, but only riders born after 1 January 1987 were eligible to be ranked in the classification. There was also a classification for teams, in which the times of the best three cyclists per team on each stage were added together; the leading team at the end of the race was the team with the lowest total time, and each member of the winning team received a red jersey on the final podium. Additionally, a green jersey was awarded on the podium each day, for the most aggressive rider, or riders, of that day's stage.

Stage	Winner	General Classification	Mountains Classification	Sprint Classification	Young Rider Classification	Team Classification	Aggressive Rider
1	André Greipel	André Greipel	Jordan Kerby	André Greipel	Arnaud Démare	Lampre–Merida	Jordan Kerby
2	Geraint Thomas	Geraint Thomas	Geraint Thomas	Daniele Pietropolli	Tom-Jelte Slagter	RadioShack–Leopard	Christopher Juul-Jensen
3	Tom-Jelte Slagter	Geraint Thomas	Geraint Thomas	Geraint Thomas	Tom-Jelte Slagter	RadioShack–Leopard	Simon Clarke
4	André Greipel	Geraint Thomas	Jack Bobridge	André Greipel	Tom-Jelte Slagter	RadioShack–Leopard	Philippe Gilbert; Damien Howson
5	Simon Gerrans	Tom-Jelte Slagter	Javier Moreno	Tom-Jelte Slagter	Tom-Jelte Slagter	RadioShack–Leopard	Thomas De Gendt
6	André Greipel	Tom-Jelte Slagter	Javier Moreno	Geraint Thomas	Tom-Jelte Slagter	RadioShack–Leopard	Geraint Thomas
Final		Tom-Jelte Slagter	Javier Moreno	Geraint Thomas	Tom-Jelte Slagter	RadioShack–Leopard	–
