= Timon Seubert =

German cyclist

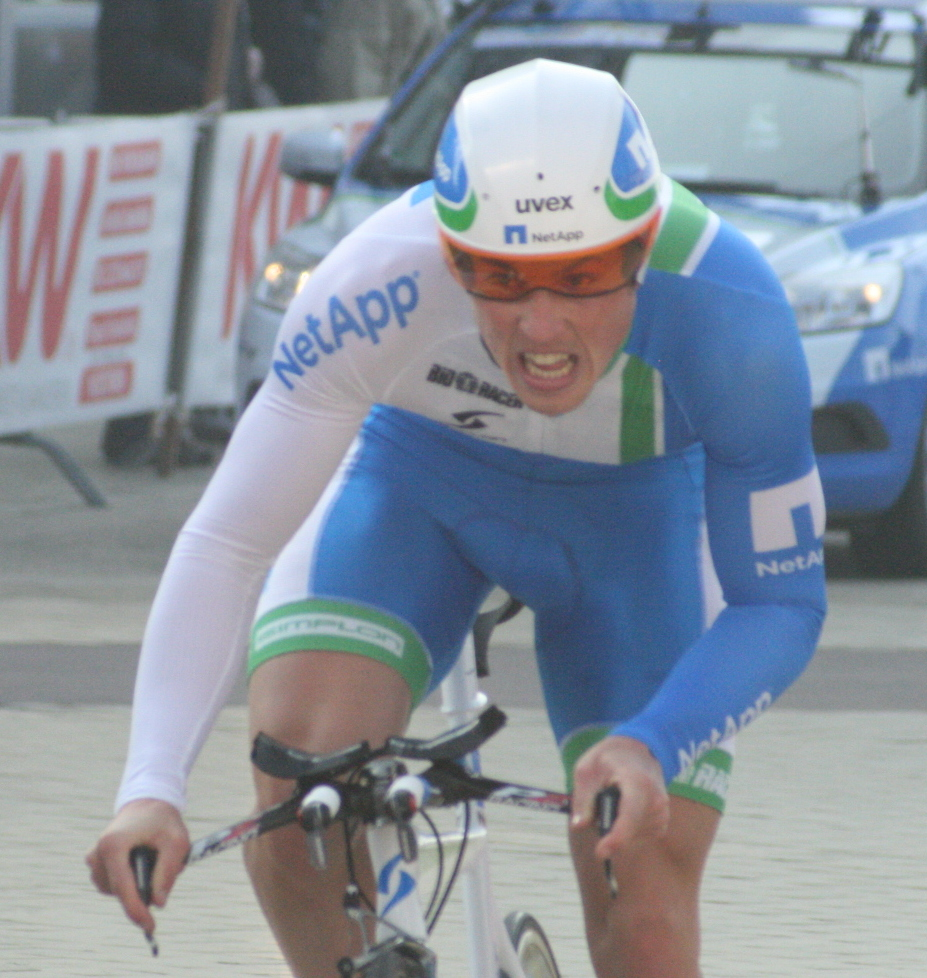

Personal information
- Born: 23 April 1987 (age 39) Hamburg, Germany

Cycling career
- Sport: Cycling
- Current team: Retired
- Discipline: Road
- Role: Rider

Professional team
- 2010–2012: Team NetApp

Timon Seubert (born 23 April 1987, in Hamburg) is a German cyclist. He rode in the 2012 Giro d'Italia.

== Palmares ==
2010
2nd Okolo Slovenska
