= Andrea Grendene =

Italian cyclist

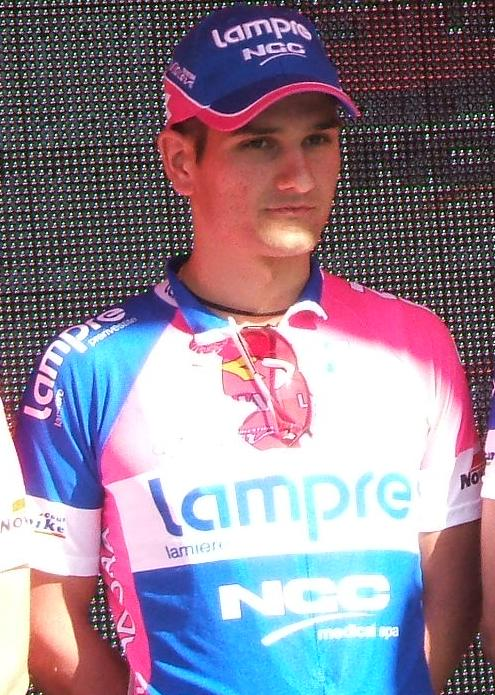

Personal information
- Full name: Andrea Grendene
- Born: 4 July 1986 (age 40) Thiene, Italy
- Height: 1.75 m (5 ft 9 in)
- Weight: 70 kg (154 lb)

Cycling career
- Sport: Cycling
- Discipline: Road
- Role: Rider

Professional teams
- 2009–2010: Lampre–NGC
- 2011: Team Type 1–Sanofi Aventis

Andrea Grendene (born 4 July 1986) is an Italian former professional road bicycle racer, who rode as a professional between 2009 and 2011.

== Biography ==
Born in Thiene, Italy, Grendene currently lives in Montecchio Precalcino, near Vicenza. He was a member of the Under 23 Italian National Team in the Tour of Flanders U23 and the Ville de Saguenay races in 2008. He gained 9 wins, including the GP Liberazione di Roma and turned professional with Lampre. His debut race was the Eneco Tour on 20 August 2008.
