= Emanuele Bindi =

Italian road bicycle racer

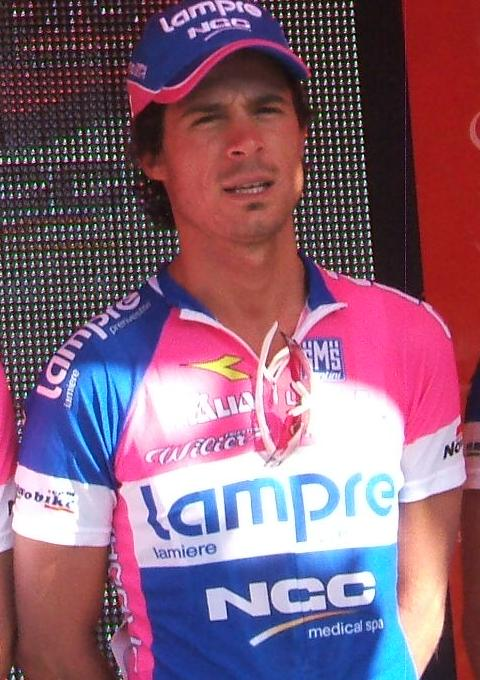

Personal information
- Full name: Emanuele Bindi
- Born: 7 October 1981 (age 45) Pistoia, Italy

Cycling career
- Sport: Cycling
- Discipline: Road
- Role: Rider

Professional teams
- 2006: OTC Doors–Lauretana
- 2007: Universal Caffe'
- 2008–2010: Lampre
- 2011: Meridiana–Kamen

Emanuele Bindi (born 7 October 1981 in Pistoia) is an Italian former professional road bicycle racer.

In 2013, Bindi pleaded guilty for involvement in the Mantova doping investigation, and received a one-year ban on the preliminary hearing.

== Major results ==
2003
1st Stage 5 Ruban Granitier Breton
2007
3rd Giro del Mendrisiotto
2011
8th Overall Tour de Serbie
