= Enrico Magazzini =

Italian cyclist (born 1988)

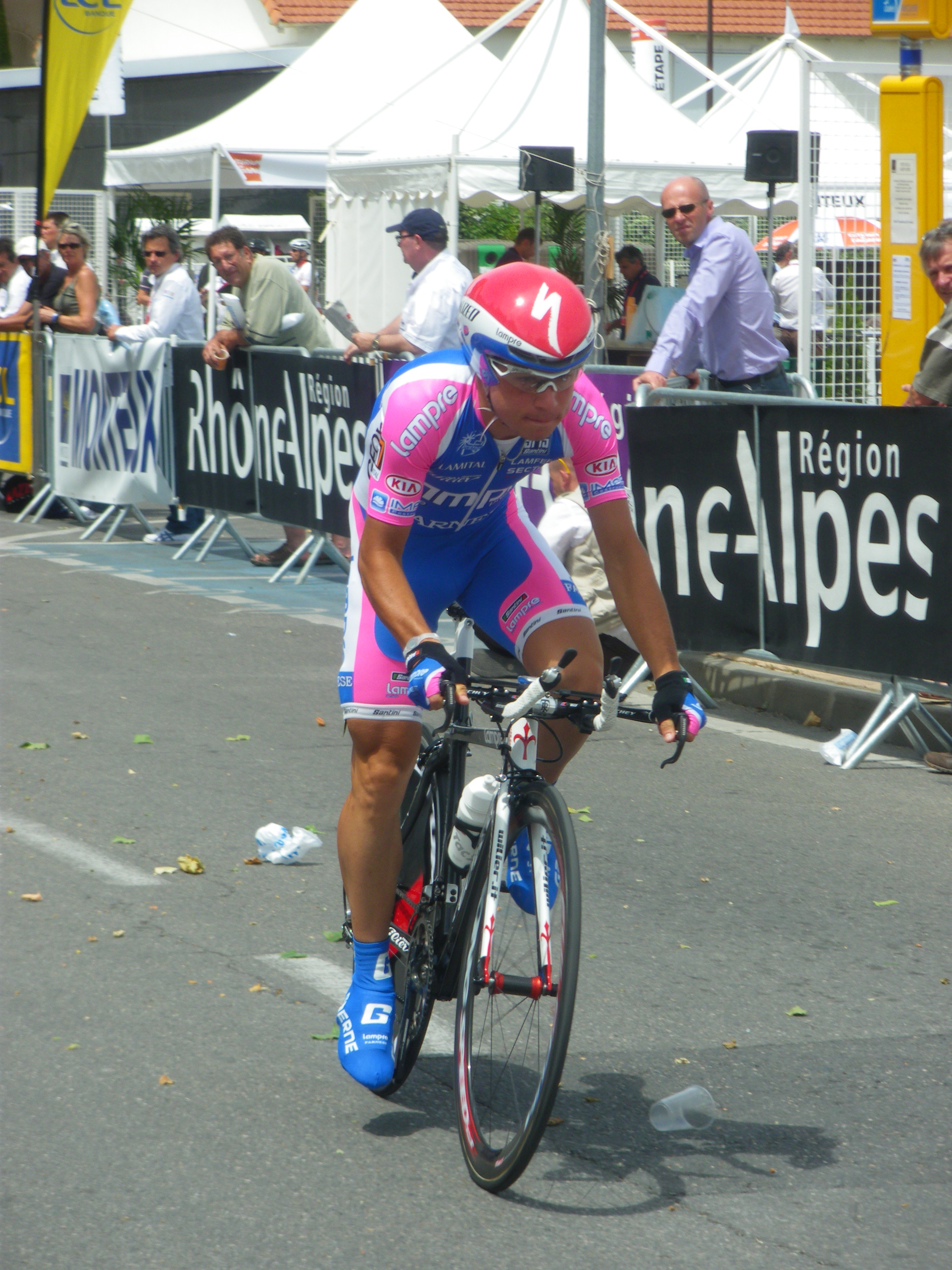

Personal information
- Born: 27 April 1988 (age 38) Empoli, Italy

Cycling career
- Sport: Cycling
- Current team: Retired
- Discipline: Road
- Role: Rider

Professional team
- 2009–2011: Lampre–ISD (from 1/7)

Enrico Magazzini (born 27 April 1988) is a former Italian cyclist.

== Palmares ==
2005
1st stage 4 Giro della Lunigiana
2006
2nd Trofeo Dorigo Porte
3rd Tre Ciclistica Bresciana
2009
2nd Gran Premio Industrie del Marmo
3rd Trofeo Matteotti U23
