= Massimo Graziato =

Italian road cyclist

Personal information
- Full name: Massimo Graziato
- Born: 25 September 1988 (age 38) Este, Veneto, Italy
- Height: 1.81 m (5 ft 11 1/2 in)
- Weight: 73 kg (161 lb)

Cycling career
- Sport: Cycling
- Discipline: Road
- Role: Rider

Amateur teams
- 2007–2011: Filmop Ramonda Parolin
- 2008: Tinkoff Credit Systems (stagiaire)
- 2011: Lampre–ISD (stagiaire)

Professional teams
- 2012–2013: Lampre–ISD
- 2015: African Wildlife Safaris Cycling Team
- 2015–2016: Parkhotel Valkenburg Continental Team

Massimo Graziato (born 25 September 1988) is an Italian former professional road cyclist, who rode professionally between 2012 and 2016 for the Lampre–Merida, African Wildlife Safaris Cycling Team and Parkhotel Valkenburg Continental Team squads.

== Major results ==
2006
1st Prologue Tre Cicilista Bresciana
3rd Trofeo Buffoni
3rd Overall Kroz Istru
2009
1st Stage 2 Vuelta a Tenerife
4th Trofeo Edil C
4th Paris–Roubaix Espoirs
8th Coppa San Geo
2010
1st Trofeo Edil C
1st GP Città di Valeggio
2011
1st Stage 2 Giro del Friuli-Venezia Giulia
4th Trofeo Franco Balestra
2012
6th Rogaland GP

=== Grand Tour general classification results timeline ===
Grand Tour	2013
Giro d'Italia	—
Tour de France	—
Vuelta a España	144

Legend
—	Did not compete
DNF	Did not finish
