= Dmytro Krivtsov =

Ukrainian racing cyclist

Personal information
- Full name: Dmytro Krivtsov
- Born: 3 April 1985 (age 41) Pervomaisk, Mykolaiv Oblast, Ukrainian SSR, Soviet Union
- Height: 1.83 m (6 ft 0 in)
- Weight: 72 kg (159 lb)

Cycling career
- Sport: Cycling
- Current team: Eurocar GS Cycling Team
- Discipline: Road
- Role: Rider (retired); Directeur sportif

Professional teams
- 2007–2008: ISD Sport Donetsk
- 2009–2010: ISD–NERI
- 2011–2012: Lampre–ISD
- 2013: ISD Continental Team
- 2014: Kolss Cycling Team
- 2015–2016: ISD–Jorbi

Managerial team
- 2021–: Eurocar–Grawe

Dmytro Krivtsov (Ukrainian: Дмитро Іванович Кривцов; born 3 April 1985) is a Ukrainian former professional road bicycle racer, who rode professionally between 2007 and 2016. He currently works as a directeur sportif for UCI Continental team Eurocar GS Cycling Team.

Dmytro's older brother Yuriy Krivtsov was a part of the Lampre–ISD squad. Krivtsov was part of the Lampre–ISD team in the 2012 Tour de France, his Grand Tour début.

== Major results ==
2006
3rd Road race, National Under-23 Road Championships
2007
3rd La Roue Tourangelle
4th Mayor Cup
7th Road race, UEC European Under-23 Road Championships
10th Overall Ronde de l'Oise
2008
Tour de Ribas

1st Stages 1 & 3

3rd Overall Grand Prix of Donetsk

1st Stage 2

3rd Overall Five Rings of Moscow
4th Mayor Cup
6th La Roue Tourangelle
7th Memorial Oleg Dyachenko
2012
2nd Road race, National Road Championships
2013
8th Overall Tour of China II
8th Central European Tour Košice–Miskolc
8th Tour of Almaty
2014
3rd Road race, National Road Championships
5th Grand Prix of Moscow
5th Race Horizon Park 3
6th Memorial Oleg Dyachenko
7th Mayor Cup
2015
9th Krasnodar–Anapa
9th Maykop–Ulyap–Maykop
10th Overall Grand Prix of Adygeya
2016
8th Minsk Cup
10th Race Horizon Park Classic
