= Marco Marzano =

Italian cyclist (born 1980)

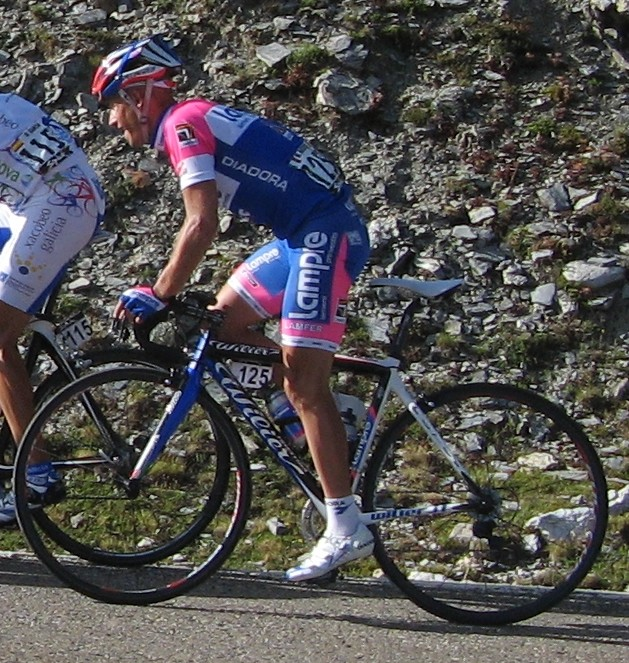
- Marzano at the 2008 Vuelta a España.

Personal information
- Full name: Marco Marzano
- Nickname: Marza
- Born: 10 June 1980 (age 46) Cuggiono, Italy
- Height: 1.71 m (5 ft 7 in)
- Weight: 58 kg (128 lb)

Cycling career
- Sport: Cycling
- Current team: UAE Team Emirates XRG
- Discipline: Road
- Role: Rider (retired); Technical assistant

Professional teams
- 2004: → Lampre (stagiaire)
- 2005–2012: Lampre–Caffita

Managerial team
- 2013–: Lampre–Merida

Marco Marzano (born 10 June 1980 in Cuggiono, Milan) is an Italian former professional road bicycle racer, who competed as a professional between 2005 and 2012.

== Major results ==
- Baby Giro – 1 stage & Overall (2004)
- 3rd, National Amateur Road Race Championship (2004)
- Giro della Valle d'Aosta – 1 stage & Overall (2003)
