= Alfredo Balloni =

Italian cyclist

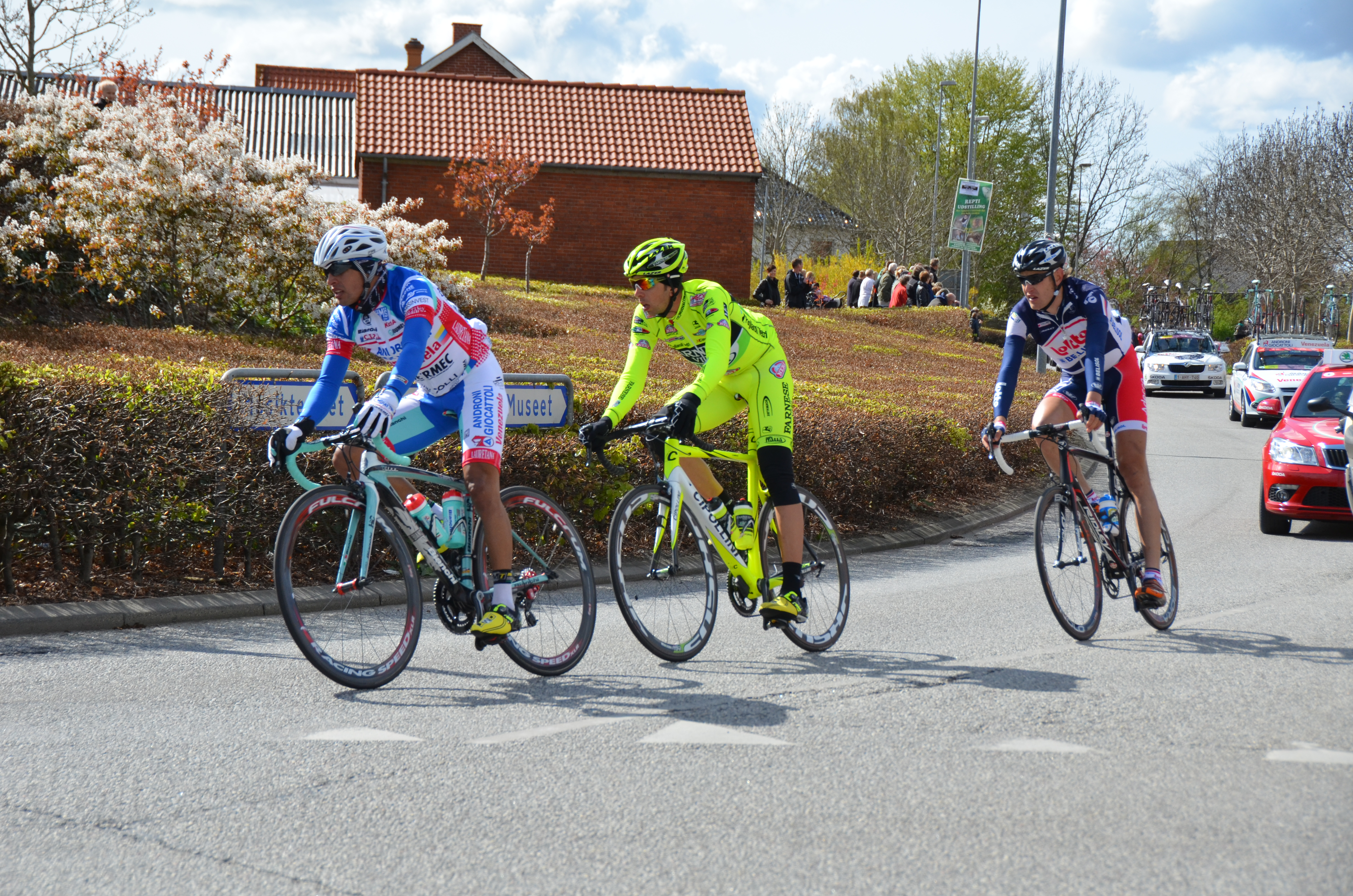
- Balloni (in the middle) during the Giro d'Italia in 2012

Personal information
- Full name: Alfredo Balloni
- Born: 20 September 1989 (age 37) Rome, Italy
- Height: 1.86 m (6 ft 1 in)
- Weight: 72 kg (159 lb; 11.3 st)

Cycling career
- Sport: Cycling
- Current team: Retired
- Discipline: Road
- Role: Rider
- Rider type: Rouleur

Amateur teams
- 2007: Arianna Rimor (junior)
- 2008: AGI Neri Lucchini Sprint (amateur)
- 2009: Promociclo Neri Sottoli (amateur)

Professional teams
- 2010–2011: Lampre–Farnese Vini
- 2012: Farnese Vini–Selle Italia
- 2013–2014: Ceramica Flaminia–Fondriest

Alfredo Balloni (born 20 September 1989) is an Italian former professional road bicycle racer, who last rode for UCI Continental Team Nankang–Fondriest.

== Career ==
Born in Rome, Balloni has competed as a professional since 2010, competing for the Lampre–Farnese Vini squad for two seasons before joining the Farnese Vini–Selle Italia team for the 2012 season. On his Grand Tour début at the 2012 Giro d'Italia, Balloni held the lead of the mountains classification during the race's first leg in Denmark.

== Major results ==
2005
1st Road race, National Novice Road Championships
2006
National Junior Road Championships

1st Road race
3rd Time trial

2007
1st Time trial, National Junior Road Championships
1st Memorial Maresciallo Sorvillo
1st Coppa Ocria
2nd Overall Giro della Toscana
2008
3rd Overall Coupe des Nations Ville de Saguenay

1st Stage 3

2009
National Under-23 Road Championships

1st Time trial
2nd Road race

1st Trofeo Matteotti Under-23
2nd GP Città di Felino
2nd Ruota d'Oro
2012
Giro d'Italia

Held after Stages 2–5

2013
5th Tour du Jura
8th Giro del Medio Brenta
