= Alessandro Spezialetti =

Italian cyclist

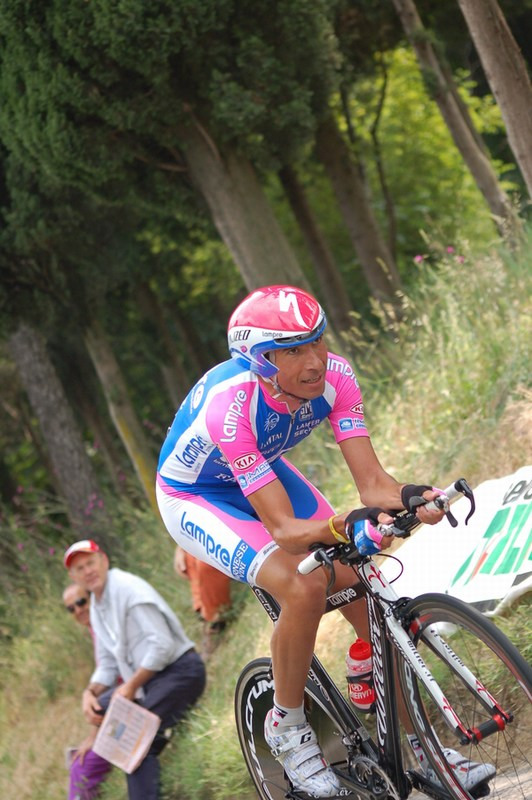
- Spezialetti at the 2010 Giro d'Italia.

Personal information
- Full name: Alessandro Spezialetti
- Nickname: Spezia
- Born: 14 January 1975 (age 51) Lachen, Switzerland
- Height: 1.79 m (5 ft 10 in)
- Weight: 69 kg (152 lb)

Cycling career
- Sport: Cycling
- Discipline: Road
- Role: Rider; Directeur sportif
- Rider type: Domestique

Amateur teams
- 1995: Calzaturieri Montegranaro
- 1996: Euromop Giomo Cucine Caneva

Professional teams
- 1997: Batik–Del Monte
- 1998: Riso Scotti–MG Maglificio
- 1999: Mobilvetta Design–Northwave
- 2000: Liquigas–Pata
- 2001: Cantina Tollo–Acqua & Sapone
- 2002–2004: Saeco–Longoni Sport
- 2005: Lampre–Caffita
- 2006–2007: Liquigas
- 2008–2009: LPR Brakes–Ballan
- 2010–2012: Lampre–Farnese Vini

Managerial teams
- 2014: Vini Fantini–Nippo
- 2015: GM Cycling Team
- 2016: Team Roth
- 2017–2022: Androni Giocattoli–Sidermec

Major wins
- Grand Tours Giro d'Italia 1 TTT stage (2007)

Alessandro Spezialetti (born 14 January 1975 in Lachen, Switzerland) is an Italian former professional road bicycle racer, who competed professionally between 1997 and 2012. He was known as a lieutenant, or top domestique in Grand Tours.

== Major results ==
1996
2nd Overall Giro delle Regioni

1st Prologue & Stage 3b

2nd Trofeo Zsšdi
2nd Piccola Sanremo
3rd La Popolarissima
3rd Coppa della Pace
1998
6th Subida a Urkiola
1999
3rd Giro di Toscana
4th GP Industria & Artigianato di Larciano
6th Overall Tirreno–Adriatico
2000
9th GP Miguel Induráin
2001
1st Stage 2 Giro d'Abruzzo
9th Trofeo Matteotti
2003
2nd Trofeo Matteotti
9th Japan Cup
2007
1st Stage 1 (TTT) Giro d'Italia

=== Grand Tour general classification results timeline ===
Grand Tour	1997	1998	1999	2000	2001	2002	2003	2004	2005	2006	2007	2008	2009	2010	2011	2012
Giro d'Italia	DNF	—	37	DNF	64	48	46	65	—	93	63	41	74	118	107	77
Tour de France	—	DNF	—	—	—	—	—	—	DNF	—	—	—	—	—	—	—
Vuelta a España	—	—	—	DNF	—	DNF	—	116	—	100	—	—	—	—	DNF	—

Legend
DSQ	Disqualified
DNF	Did not finish
