= Daniele Righi =

Italian cyclist

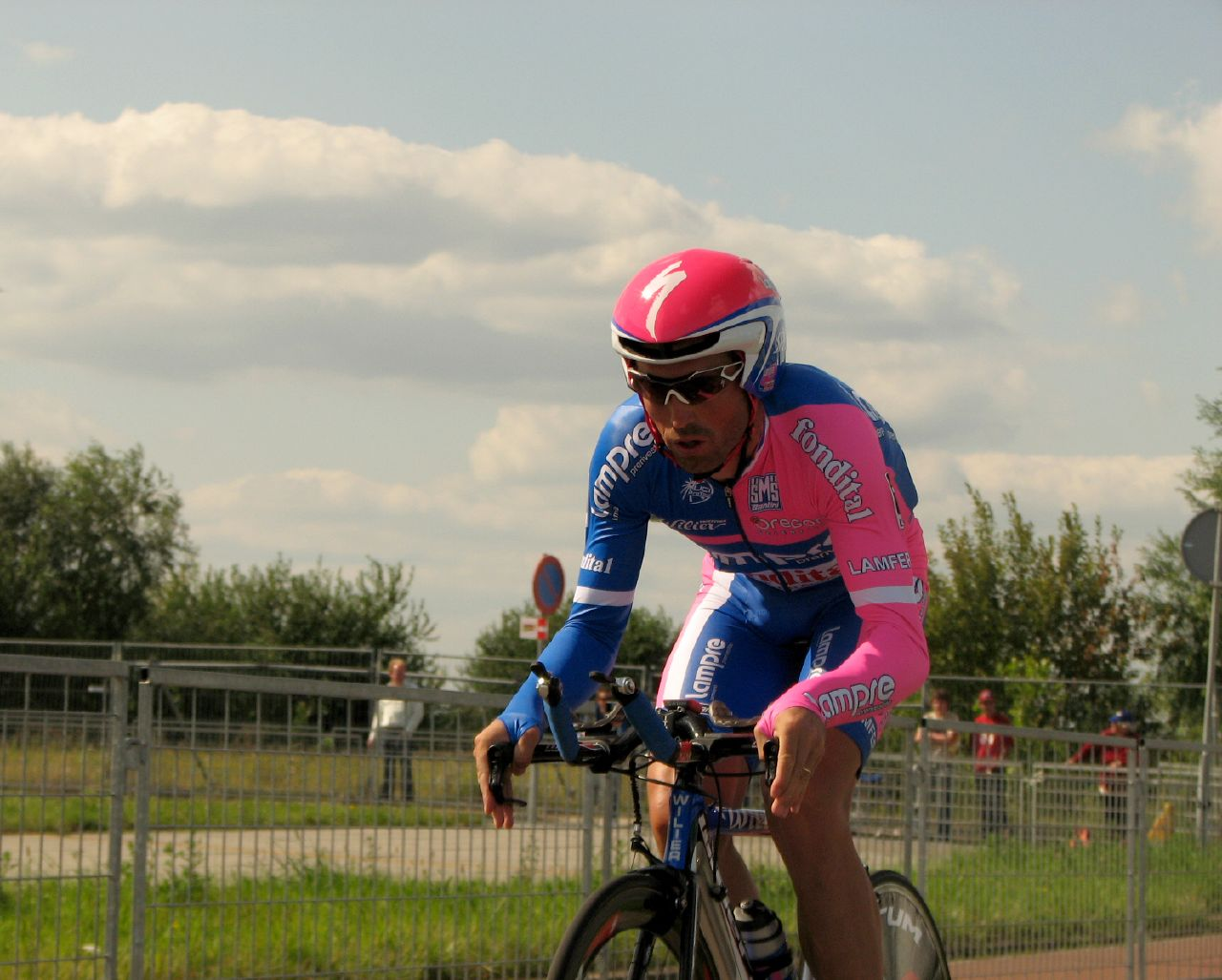
- Righi at the 2007 Eneco Tour

Personal information
- Full name: Daniele Righi
- Born: 28 March 1976 (age 50) Colle Val d'Elsa, Italy
- Height: 1.80 m (5 ft 11 in)
- Weight: 70 kg (154 lb)

Cycling career
- Sport: Cycling
- Current team: UAE Team Emirates XRG
- Discipline: Road
- Role: Rider (retired); Team liaison

Professional teams
- 2000–2001: Alexia
- 2002: Index-Alexia
- 2003–2012: Lampre

Managerial teams
- 2014–2016: Lampre–Merida
- 2017–2018: UAE Team Emirates XRG

Daniele Righi (born 28 March 1976, in Colle Val d'Elsa) is an Italian former professional road bicycle racer, who competed as a professional between 2000 and 2012.

== Career ==
Daniele started competitive biking at the age of 8, then in 1995 he rose out of youth competition. In 2002 he helped Paolo Savoldelli win the Giro d'Italia as a wingman, before moving to Lampre. Between 2005 and 2009 he also participated in the Tour de France, for a total of 5 years.

== Coaching ==
After retiring from competition in 2012, Daniele has coached at both Lampre and UAE Team Emirates.
