= Daniele Pietropolli =

Italian cyclist

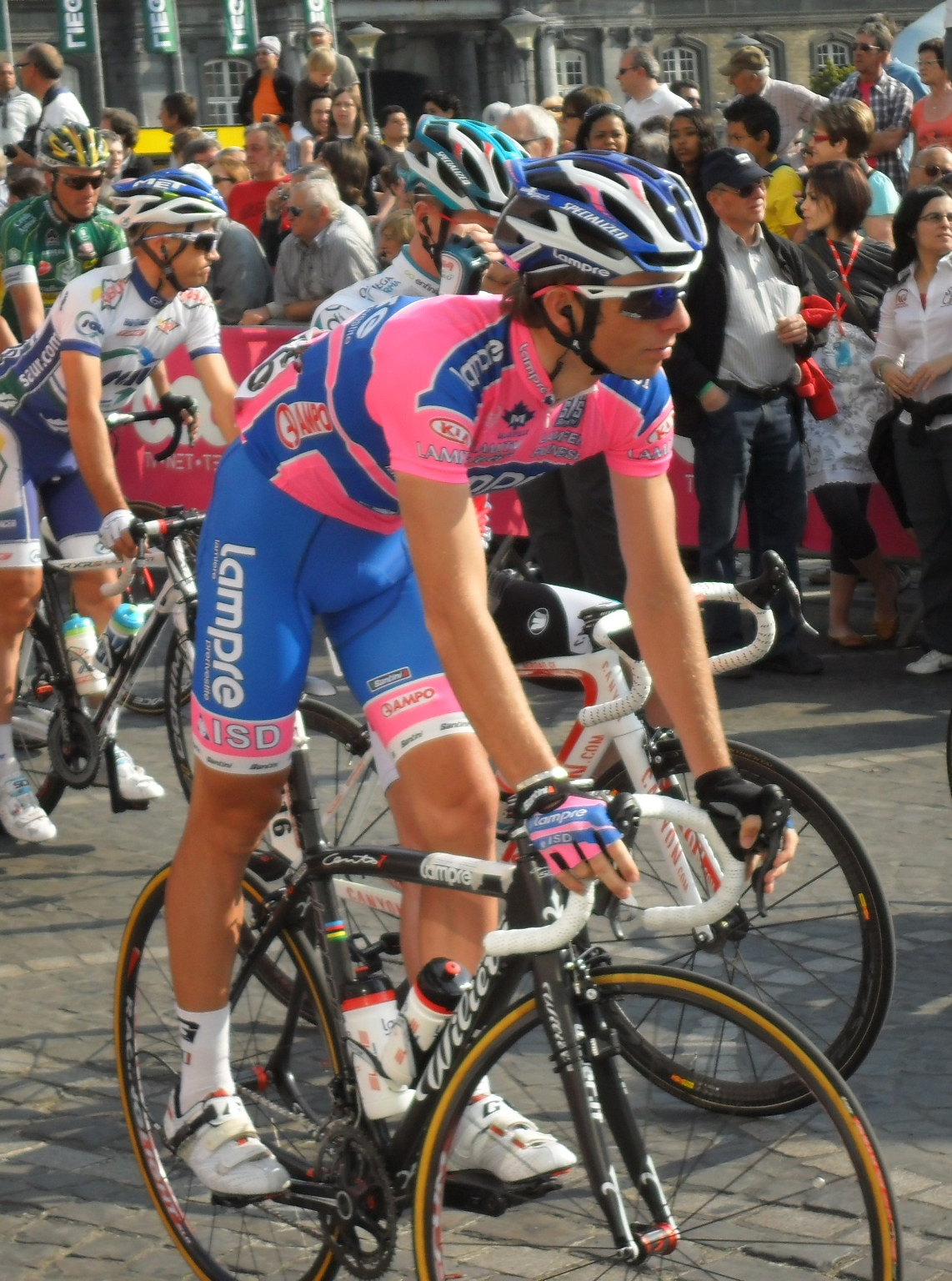
- Pietropolli at the 2011 Liège–Bastogne–Liège.

Personal information
- Full name: Daniele Pietropolli
- Born: 11 July 1980 (age 46) Bussolengo, Italy
- Height: 1.74 m (5 ft 9 in)
- Weight: 61 kg (134 lb)

Cycling career
- Sport: Cycling
- Discipline: Road
- Role: Rider

Professional teams
- 2003–2007: Tenax
- 2008–2009: LPR Brakes–Ballan
- 2010–2013: Lampre–Farnese Vini

Daniele Pietropolli (born 11 July 1980, in Bussolengo, Veneto) is an Italian former professional road bicycle racer, who last rode for Lampre–Merida.

== Major results ==
2008
1st Overall Giro della Provincia di Reggio Calabria

1st Stage 3

2009
1st Overall Giro della Provincia di Grosseto

1st Stage 3

1st Overall Settimana Ciclista Lombarda

1st Stage 1 (TTT)

2011
1st Overall Giro della Provincia di Reggio Calabria

1st Stage 1

1st Trofeo Laigueglia
2013
8th Overall Tour Down Under

=== Grand Tour general classification results timeline ===
Grand Tour	2003	2004	2005	2006	2007	2008	2009	2010	2011	2012	2013
Giro d'Italia	67	80	—	—	—	57	94	—	—	91	80
Tour de France	—	—	—	—	—	—	—	—	—	—	—
Vuelta a España	—	—	—	—	—	—	—	61	—	—	—

Legend
—	Did not compete
DNF	Did not finish
