= Matteo Bono =

Italian former road bicycle racer

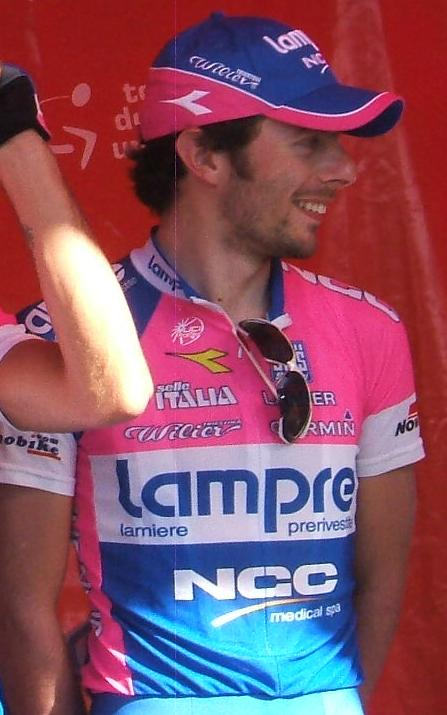
- Bono at the 2009 Tour Down Under.

Personal information
- Full name: Matteo Bono
- Born: 11 November 1983 (age 42) Iseo, Italy
- Height: 1.74 m (5 ft 8 1/2 in)
- Weight: 60 kg (132 lb)

Cycling career
- Sport: Cycling
- Current team: Retired
- Discipline: Road
- Role: Rider
- Rider type: Domestique

Amateur teams
- 2002–2005: Colibri–Unidelta
- 2005: Lampre–Caffita (stagiaire)

Professional team
- 2006–2018: Lampre–Fondital

Matteo Bono (born 11 November 1983) is an Italian former road bicycle racer, who competed professionally for UAE Team Emirates through various team iterations between 2006 and 2018. During his career, he took three professional victories – stage wins at the 2007 Tirreno–Adriatico, the 2007 Tour de Romandie and the 2011 Eneco Tour.

== Career ==
Born in Iseo, Bono turned professional in 2006 with Lampre–Fondital. He took his first professional wins in 2007, winning stage six at Tirreno–Adriatico – soloing away from his breakaway companions Enrico Gasparotto and Giovanni Visconti with 4 kilometres (2.5 miles) remaining – and stage three of the Tour de Romandie, having been in a breakaway with Fumiyuki Beppu and Marco Pinotti before outsprinting Beppu on the line. Between those victories, Bono also finished third at the Klasika Primavera, behind Caisse d'Epargne teammates Joaquim Rodríguez and Alejandro Valverde.

Bono did not win another race for another four years, until he won the penultimate stage of the Eneco Tour from a three-man breakaway in August 2011, holding off the main field by six seconds. Throughout the remainder of his career, Bono largely worked as a domestique, before retiring at the end of the 2018 season.

== Major results ==
2004
4th Gran Premio della Liberazione
8th Ruota d'Oro
2005
1st Trofeo Città di Brescia
4th Trofeo Banca Popolare di Vicenza
7th Trofeo Franco Balestra
2007
1st Stage 6 Tirreno–Adriatico
1st Stage 3 Tour de Romandie
1st Stage 1 (TTT) Tour de Pologne
3rd Klasika Primavera
2011
1st Stage 5 Eneco Tour

=== Grand Tour general classification results timeline ===
Grand Tour	2007	2008	2009	2010	2011	2012	2013	2014	2015	2016	2017
Giro d'Italia	139	—	123	86	—	99	—	77	—	—	—
Tour de France	—	117	—	—	93	—	DNF	—	118	136	111
Vuelta a España	—	—	—	—	—	—	143	—	—	—	—

Legend
—	Did not compete
DNF	Did not finish
