= Andriy Vasylyuk =

Ukrainian cyclist (born 1987)

Personal information
- Full name: Andriy Vasylyuk
- Born: 29 August 1987 (age 39): Nizhyn, Ukrainian SSR, Soviet Union; (now Ukraine)
- Height: 1.78 m (5 ft 10 in)
- Weight: 65 kg (143 lb)

Cycling career
- Sport: Cycling
- Discipline: Road
- Role: Rider

Professional teams
- 2007–2008: Ukraine-Neri Sottoli Team
- 2010–2017: Kolss Cycling Team
- 2018: Team Hurom
- 2019: Kyiv Capital Team
- 2020: Yunnan Lvshan Landscape

Major wins
- One-day races and Classics National Time Trial Championships (2013, 2014, 2016)

Andriy Vasylyuk (born 29 August 1987) is a Ukrainian racing cyclist, who most recently rode for UCI Continental team Yunnan Lvshan Landscape. He rode at the 2014 UCI Road World Championships.

== Major results ==
2005
9th Time trial, UCI Juniors World Championships
2010
3rd Time trial, National Road Championships
2011
4th Overall Okolo Slovenska
7th Overall Grand Prix of Sochi
10th Overall Five Rings of Moscow
2012
9th Overall Five Rings of Moscow
10th Grand Prix of Donetsk
10th Memorial Oleg Dyachenko
10th Grand Prix of Moscow
2013
1st Time trial, National Road Championships
1st Prologue Five Rings of Moscow
5th Overall Grand Prix of Sochi
6th Overall Tour of Romania

1st Prologue (TTT)

10th Overall Grand Prix of Adygeya
10th Overall Baltic Chain Tour
2014
1st Time trial, National Road Championships
6th Overall Grand Prix of Adygeya
8th Overall Tour of Szeklerland
10th Overall Baltic Chain Tour
2015
1st Overall Podlasie Tour
3rd Time trial, National Road Championships
7th Overall Tour of Qinghai Lake
7th Horizon Park Race for Peace
9th Overall Tour of Mersin
2016
1st Time trial, National Road Championships
1st Tour de Ribas
2nd Overall Baltic Chain Tour
5th Overall Tour of Qinghai Lake

1st Stage 12 (ITT)

5th Odessa Grand Prix
8th Belgrade–Banja Luka I
10th Overall Tour of Ukraine

1st Stage 2a (TTT)

2017
1st Mountains classification Czech Cycling Tour
National Road Championships

2nd Time trial
4th Road race

2nd Overall Tour of Ukraine

1st Stage 2 (TTT)

2nd Tour de Ribas
3rd Overall Tour of Bulgaria South
4th Odessa Grand Prix
5th Overall Tour of Taihu Lake
5th Overall Tour d'Azerbaïdjan
7th Overall Tour of Fuzhou
8th Overall Tour of Bulgaria North
8th Overall Tour of Xingtai
8th Overall Okolo Slovenska
8th Overall Szlakiem Walk Majora Hubala
2018
6th GP Czech Republic
8th Overall Baltic Chain Tour
2019
1st Chabany Race
1st Race Horizon Park Classic
2nd Time trial, National Road Championships
4th Horizon Park Race for Peace
5th Odessa Grand Prix
2020
3rd Time trial, National Road Championships
3rd Grand Prix Develi
3rd Grand Prix World's Best High Altitude
5th Grand Prix Velo Erciyes
6th Grand Prix Mount Erciyes
6th Grand Prix Central Anatolia
