= Sergey Kolesnikov (cyclist) =

Russian cyclist

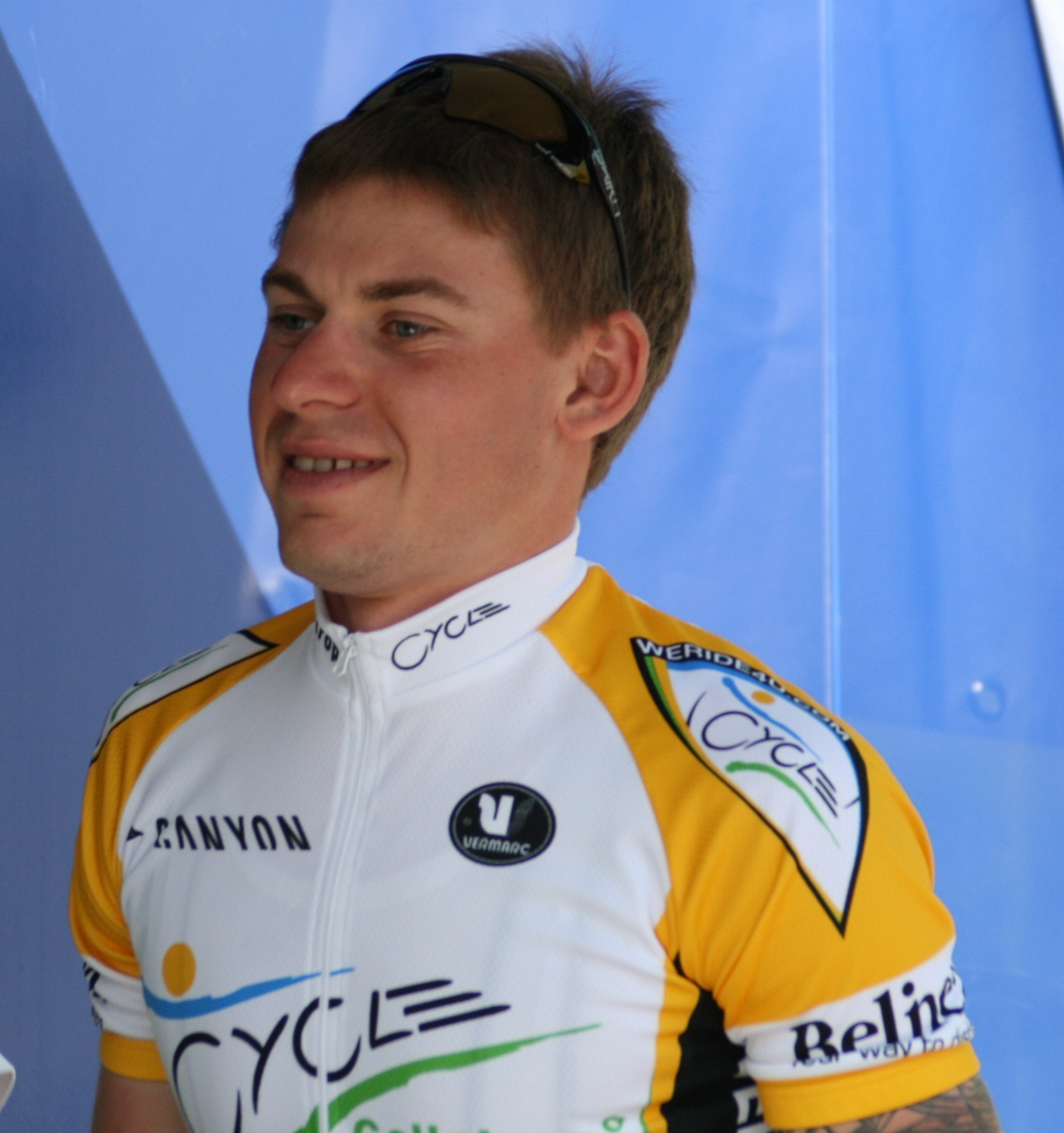

Personal information
- Full name: Sergey Alexandrovich Kolesnikov
- Born: 3 September 1986 (age 40)
- Height: 1.79 m (5 ft 10 in)

Cycling career
- Sport: Cycling
- Current team: Retired
- Disciplines: Road; Track
- Role: Rider

Amateur teams
- 2005–2006: Omnibike Dynamo Moscow
- 2009–2010: Moscow

Professional teams
- 2007–2008: Unibet.com
- 2011: Amore & Vita

Sergey Alexandrovich Kolesnikov (Серге́й Александрович Колесников; born 3 September 1986) is a Russian former professional track and road bicycle racer.

== Major results ==
=== Road ===
2005
2nd Overall Grand Prix of Sochi
3rd Grand Prix of Moscow
2006
1st Tour du Finistère
1st Overall Circuit des Ardennes

1st Stage 2

1st Overall Tour of Hainan
1st Overall GP Sochi

1st Stage 4

1st Classic Loire Atlantique
1st Riga GP
1st La Roue Tourangelle
1st Ruota d'Oro
2nd Grand Prix de Beuvry-la-Forêt
3rd Grand Prix of Moscow
4th Overall Tour of South China Sea
6th Overall Tour de Serbie
6th Tartu GP
8th Road race, UCI Under-23 Road World Championships
8th Tallinn–Tartu GP
2007
2nd Road race, National Road Championships
4th Halle–Ingooigem
10th Grote Prijs Jef Scherens
2009
1st Overall Bałtyk–Karkonosze Tour
1st Stage 3 Vuelta a Costa Rica
2nd Grand Prix of Donetsk
2nd Gran Premio San Giuseppe
2nd Poreč Trophy
3rd Overall Paths of King Nikola
10th Overall Five Rings of Moscow

=== Track ===
2004
2nd Team pursuit, European Junior Championships
3rd Team pursuit, UCI Junior World Championships
2005
1st Team pursuit, European Under-23 Championships
2006
2nd Team pursuit, European Under-23 Championships
2007
3rd Points race, Los Angeles, UCI World Cup Classics
2008
3rd Madison (with Ivan Kovalev), European Championships
3rd Madison, Manchester (with Ivan Kovalev), UCI World Cup Classics
2009
2nd Madison (with Alexey Shmidt), European Championships
3rd Madison, Manchester (with Alexey Shmidt), UCI World Cup Classics
