= Sergiy Lagkuti =

Ukrainian cyclist

Personal information
- Born: 24 April 1985 (age 41) Simferopol, Ukraine
- Height: 1.76 m (5 ft 9 in)
- Weight: 68 kg (150 lb)

Cycling career
- Sport: Cycling
- Current team: Retired
- Disciplines: Road; Track
- Role: Rider

Professional teams
- 2007: ISD Sport Donetsk
- 2013–2017: Kolss Cycling Team

Sergiy Lagkuti (born 24 April 1985) is a Ukrainian former racing cyclist. He rode at the 2014 UCI Road World Championships.

== Major results ==
2008
3rd Team pursuit, 2008–09 UCI Track Cycling World Cup Classics, Melbourne
2009
1st Stage 6 Tour of Bulgaria
2009–10 UCI Track Cycling World Cup Classics

3rd Scratch, Manchester
3rd Madison, Melbourne

2010
1st Stage 5 Bałtyk–Karkonosze Tour
3rd Madison, UEC European Track Championships
2012
1st Stage 4 Tour of Bulgaria
3rd Points race, UEC European Track Championships
3rd Time trial, National Road Championships
4th Overall Dookoła Mazowsza
10th Race Horizon Park
2013
2nd Madison, 2012–13 UCI Track Cycling World Cup, Aguascalientes
4th Time trial, National Road Championships
2014
1st Stage 8 Tour of Qinghai Lake
4th Race Horizon Park 2
5th Time trial, National Road Championships
5th Overall Tour d'Azerbaïdjan
10th Overall Grand Prix of Adygeya
10th Race Horizon Park 3
2015
1st Time trial, National Road Championships
1st Moscow Cup
1st Race Horizon Park for Peace
4th Grand Prix of Vinnytsia
5th Grand Prix of ISD
7th Overall Five Rings of Moscow
2016
1st Overall Tour of Ukraine

1st Stages 1 & 2a (TTT)

1st Overall Tour of Qinghai Lake

1st Stage 6

3rd Tour de Ribas
6th Belgrade–Banja Luka I
2017
1st Overall Tour of Bulgaria North

1st Mountains classification
1st Stage 1

1st Tour de Ribas
3rd Overall Tour of Ukraine

1st Stage 2 (TTT)

3rd Race Horizon Park Classic
5th Time trial, National Road Championships
5th Odessa Grand Prix
6th Overall Tour of Bulgaria South
8th Overall Tour of Qinghai Lake
