= Konstantin Ponomarev =

Russian cyclist

Personal information
- Full name: Konstantin Viktorovich Ponomarev
- Born: 1 January 1981 (age 45)

Cycling career
- Sport: Cycling
- Disciplines: Road, track
- Role: Rider

Professional teams
- 2006: Omnibike Dynamo Moscow
- 2007: Moscow Stars

Konstantin Viktorovich Ponomarev (Russian: Константин Викторович Пономарёв; born 1 January 1981) is a Russian professional racing cyclist.

== Palmarès ==
2003
1st, Stage 1, Volta a Lleida, Els Alamus
2006
2006–2007 Track Cycling World Cup

2nd, Madison, Moscow (with Alexey Shmidt)

2007
2006–2007 Track Cycling World Cup

3rd, Team Pursuit, Los Angeles (with Vasily Khatuntsev, Alexey Shmidt and Valery Valynin)
3rd, Madison, Los Angeles (with Alexey Shmidt)
