= 2006–07 UCI Track Cycling World Cup Classics =

International track cycling competition

The 2006–2007 UCI Track Cycling World Cup Classics is a multi race tournament over a season of track cycling. The season began on 17 November 2006 and completed on 25 February 2007. The World Cup is organised by the UCI.

== Calendar ==
=== Men ===
Event	Winner	Second	Third
Australia, Sydney — November 17–19, 2006
Keirin	Theo Bos (NED)	Ryan Bayley (AUS)	René Wolff (GER)
1 km time trial	Chris Hoy (GBR)	Jason Queally (GBR)	Tim Veldt (NED)
Scratch	Vasil Kiryienka (BLR)	Giuseppe Atzeni (SUI)	Wim Stroetinga (NED)
Individual pursuit	Alexander Serov (RUS)	Robert Bengsch (GER)	Phillip Thuaux (AUS)
Team pursuit	Russia; Mikhail Ignatiev; Ivan Rovny; Alexander Serov; Nikolai Trusov	Denmark; Michael Mørkøv; Casper Jørgensen; Jens-Erik Madsen; Alex Rasmussen	Ukraine; Roman Kononenko; Lyubomyr Polatayko; Maksym Polischuk; Vitaliy Shchedov
Sprint	Craig MacLean (GBR)	Ross Edgar (GBR)	Teun Mulder (NED)
Points race	Mikhail Ignatiev (RUS)	Gregory Henderson (NZL)	Vasil Kiryienka (BLR)
Team sprint	Great Britain; Ross Edgar; Chris Hoy; Craig MacLean	Netherlands; Theo Bos; Teun Mulder; Tim Veldt	Great Britain; Matthew Crampton; Jason Queally; Jamie Staff
Madison	Russia; Mikhail Ignatiev; Nikolai Trusov	Denmark; Michael Mørkøv; Alex Rasmussen	Argentina; Sebastian Donadio; Jorge Pi
Russia, Moscow — December 15–17, 2006
1 km time trial	Michael Seidenbecher (GER)	Kévin Sireau (FRA)	Yevgen Bolibrukh (UKR)
Individual pursuit	Robert Bartko (GER)	Robert Hayles (GBR)	Paul Manning (GBR)
Keirin	Andrei Vynokurov (UKR)	Teun Mulder (NED)	Mickaël Bourgain (FRA)
Scratch	Ivan Kovalev (RUS)	Mitchell Docker (AUS)	Martin Bláha (CZE)
Sprint	Theo Bos (NED)	Stefan Nimke (GER)	Craig MacLean (GBR)
Team pursuit	Great Britain; Ed Clancy; Geraint Thomas; Paul Manning; Chris Newton	Russia; Ivan Kovalev; Alexander Serov; Nikolai Trusov; Ivan Rovny	Germany; Robert Bartko; Robert Bengsch; Guido Fulst; Leif Lampater
Points race	Mikhail Ignatiev (RUS)	Vasil Kiryienka (BLR)	Oleksandr Polivoda (UKR)
Team sprint	Great Britain; Matthew Crampton; Jason Kenny; Craig MacLean	Netherlands; Theo Bos; Teun Mulder; Tim Veldt	France; Grégory Baugé; Mickaël Bourgain; Kévin Sireau
Madison	Netherlands; Jens Mouris; Danny Stam	Russia; Konstantin Ponomarev; Alexey Shmidt	Denmark; Michael Mørkøv; Alex Rasmussen
United States, Los Angeles — January 19–21, 2007
1 km time trial	François Pervis (FRA)	Carsten Bergemann (GER)	Yusho Oikawa (JPN)
Individual pursuit	Vitaliy Popkov (UKR)	Fabien Sanchez (FRA)	Sergio Escobar Roure (ESP)
Keirin	Chris Hoy (GBR)	Ross Edgar (GBR)	Shane Perkins (AUS)
Scratch	Russel Hampton (GBR)	Wim Stroetinga (NED)	Walter Fernando Pérez (ARG)
Sprint	Grégory Baugé (FRA)	Roberto Chiappa (ITA)	Ross Edgar (GBR)
Team pursuit	Ukraine; Lyubomyr Polatayko; Vitaliy Popkov; Vitaliy Shchedov; Maksym Polischuk	Denmark; Casper Jørgensen; Jens-Erik Madsen; Michael Mørkøv; Alex Rasmussen	Russia; Vasily Khatuntsev; Konstantin Ponomarev; Alexei Shmidt; Valery Valynin
Points race	Cameron Meyer (AUS)	Chris Newton (GBR)	Sergey Kolesnikov (RUS)
Team sprint	Great Britain; Chris Hoy; Jamie Staff; Matthew Crampton	France; Grégory Baugé; François Pervis; Kévin Sireau	Great Britain; Ross Edgar; Jason Kenny; Jason Queally
Madison	Denmark; Michael Mørkøv; Alex Rasmussen	Belgium; Kenny De Ketele; Steve Schets	Russia; Konstantin Ponomarev; Alexey Shmidt
United Kingdom, Manchester — February 23–25, 2007
1 km time trial	Chris Hoy (GBR)	François Pervis (FRA)	Tim Veldt (NED)
Individual pursuit	Bradley Wiggins (GBR)	Alexander Serov (RUS)	Bradley McGee (AUS)
Keirin	Shane Perkins (AUS)	Qi Tang (CHN)	Hodei Mazquiarán Uría (ESP)
Scratch	Rafał Ratajczyk (POL)	Roger Kluge (GER)	Charles Bradley Huff (USA)
Sprint	Arnaud Tournant (FRA)	Chris Hoy (GBR)	Mickaël Bourgain (FRA)
Team pursuit	Great Britain; Paul Manning; Robert Hayles; Bradley Wiggins; Ed Clancy	Russia; Alexei Bauer; Evgeny Kovalev; Ivan Kovalev; Nikolay Trusov	Great Britain; Jonathan Bellis; Steven Burke; Ben Swift; Andrew Tennant
Points race	Serguei Klimov (RUS)	Ioannis Tamouridis (GRE)	Juan Esteban Curuchet (ARG)
Team sprint	Great Britain; Chris Hoy; Craig MacLean; Ross Edgar	Germany; Robert Förstemann; Matthias John; Michael Seidenbecher	Australia; Ryan Bayley; Shane Perkins; Scott Sunderland
Madison	Netherlands; Jens Mouris; Peter Schep	Great Britain; Geraint Thomas; Robert Hayles	Russia; Serguei Klimov; Nikolay Trusov

=== Women ===
Event	Winner	Second	Third
Australia, Sydney — November 17–19, 2006
Sprint	Natallia Tsylinskaya (BLR)	Victoria Pendleton (GBR)	Clara Sanchez (FRA)
Points race	Katherine Bates (AUS)	Giorgia Bronzini (ITA)	Li Yan (CHN)
Individual pursuit	Katie Mactier (AUS)	Wendy Houvenaghel (GBR)	Vilija Sereikaitė (LTU)
Team sprint	Australia; Anna Meares; Kerrie Meares	Germany; Jane Gerisch; Dana Gloss	France; Virginie Cueff; Clara Sanchez
500 m time trial	Anna Meares (AUS)	Simona Krupeckaitė (LTU)	Yvonne Hijgenaar (NED)
Scratch	Vera Koedooder (NED)	Charlotte Becker (GER)	Alena Prudnikova (RUS)
Keirin	Guo Shuang (CHN)	Jennie Reed (USA)	Dana Gloss (GER)
Russia, Moscow — December 15–17, 2006
Sprint	Natallia Tsylinskaya (BLR)	Lizandra Guerra (CUB)	Simona Krupeckaitė (LTU)
Points race	Giorgia Bronzini (ITA)	Yoanka González Pérez (CUB)	Yulia Arustamova (RUS)
500 m time trial	Lizandra Guerra (CUB)	Natallia Tsylinskaya (BLR)	Simona Krupeckaitė (LTU)
Individual pursuit	Wendy Houvenaghel (GBR)	Rebecca Romero (GBR)	Larissa Kleinmann (GER)
Team sprint	Netherlands; Yvonne Hijgenaar; Willy Kanis	Germany; Dana Gloss; Christin Muche	France; Sandie Clair; Virginie Cueff
Keirin	Victoria Pendleton (GBR)	Christin Muche (GER)	Dana Gloss (GER)
Scratch	Annalisa Cucinotta (ITA)	Lesya Kalytovska (UKR)	Yoanka González Pérez (CUB)
United States, Los Angeles — January 19–21, 2007
Sprint	Anna Meares (AUS)	Clara Sanchez (FRA)	Jane Gerisch (GER)
Points race	Sarah Hammer (USA)	Yoanka González Pérez (CUB)	Leire Olaberria Dorronsoro (ESP)
500 m time trial	Lisandra Guerra Rodriguez (CUB)	Willy Kanis (NED)	Guo Shuang (CHN)
Individual pursuit	Sarah Hammer (USA)	Verena Joos (GER)	María Luisa Calle (COL)
Team sprint	Netherlands; Yvonne Hijgenaar; Willy Kanis	Australia; Kaarle McCulloch; Anna Meares	Cuba; Yumari González; Lisandra Guerra Rodriguez
Keirin	Daniela Larreal (VEN)	Guo Shuang (CHN)	Jennie Reed (USA)
Scratch	Sarah Hammer (USA)	Rebecca Quinn (USA)	Adrie Visser (NED)
United Kingdom, Manchester — February 23–25, 2007
Sprint	Victoria Pendleton (GBR)	Guo Shuang (CHN)	Anna Meares (AUS)
Points race	Yoanka González Pérez (CUB)	Belinda Goss (AUS)	Mie Bekker Lacota (DEN)
500 m time trial	Victoria Pendleton (GBR)	Yvonne Hijgenaar (NED)	Anna Blyth (GBR)
Individual pursuit	Wendy Houvenaghel (GBR)	Rebecca Romero (GBR)	Alison Shanks (NZL)
Team sprint	Netherlands; Yvonne Hijgenaar; Willy Kanis	Great Britain; Anna Blyth; Shanaze Reade	Australia; Kristine Bayley; Anna Meares
Keirin	Victoria Pendleton (GBR)	Oksana Grishina (RUS)	Guo Shuang (CHN)
Scratch	Jianling Wang (CHN)	Belinda Goss (AUS)	Yumari González (CUB)

== Men's overall results ==
=== 1 km time trial ===
Pos.	Cyclist	Syd	Mos	LA	Man	Points
1.	Chris Hoy (GBR)	12			12	24
2.	François Pervis (FRA)			12	10	22
3.	Tim Veldt (NED)	8			8	16
4.	Yevgen Bolibrukh (UKR)	2	8		6	16
5.	Carsten Bergemann (GER)	4		10		14
6.	Michael Seidenbecher (GER)		12			12
7.	Marco Brossa (ITA)		6	6		12
8.	Kévin Sireau (FRA)		10			10
9.	(United Kingdom) Jason Queally(SIS)	10				10
10.	Azizulhasni Awang (MAS)		3	5	2	10

=== individual pursuit ===
Pos.	Cyclist	Syd	Mos	LA	Man	Points
1.	Alexander Serov (RUS)	12	7		10	29
2.	Jens Mouris (NED)	7	6		7	20
3.	Fabien Sanchez (FRA)	2		10	2	14
4.	Sergi Escobar Roure (ESP)			7	6	13
5.	Bradley Wiggins (GBR)				12	12
6.	Vitaliy Popkov (UKR)			12		12
7.	Robert Bartko (GER)		12			12
8.	David O'Loughlin (IRL)		3	6	3	12
10.	Robert Hayles (GBR)		10			10
10.	Robert Bengsch (GER)	10				10

=== keirin ===
Pos.	Cyclist	Syd	Mos	LA	Man	Points
1.	Shane Perkins (AUS)			8	12	20
2.	Ross Edgar (GBR)	4	10			14
3.	Andrei Vynokurov (UKR)		12		1	13
4.	Chris Hoy (GBR)			12		12
3.	René Wolff (GER)	8				8
5.	Theo Bos (NED)	12				12
6.	Teun Mulder (NED)		10		2	12
7.	Roberto Chiappa (ITA)	7		4		11
8.	Mark French (AUS)	5	6			11
9.	Qi Tang (CHN)				10	10
10.	(Australia) Ryan Bayley(AIS)	10				10

=== madison ===
Pos.	Cyclist	Syd	Mos	LA	Man	Points
1.	Netherlands (NED)	7	12	4	12	35
2.	Denmark (DEN)	10	8	12	4	34
3.	Russia (RUS)	12	3	8	8	31
4.	Argentina (ARG)	8		7	5	20
6.	Great Britain (GBR)		7		10	17
7.	Belgium (BEL)		6	10		16
7.	Italy (ITA)	6	4	5		15
8.	Moscow		10	3		13
9.	Czech Republic (CZE)		1	1	6	8
10.	Team100%Me				7	7

=== points race ===
Pos.	Cyclist	Syd	Mos	LA	Man	Points
1.	Mikhail Ignatiev (RUS)	12	12			24
2.	Vasil Kiryienka (BLR)	8	10			18
3.	Ioannis Tamouridis (GRE)	5			10	15
4.	Serguei Klimov (RUS)				12	12
5.	Cameron Meyer (AUS)			12		12
6.	Chris Newton (GBR)			10		10
7.	Gregory Henderson (NZL)	10				10
8.	Juan Esteban Curuchet (ARG)				8	8
9.	Sergey Kolesnikov (RUS)			8		8
10.	(Ukraine) Oleksandr Polivoda(ISD)		8			8

=== scratch ===
Pos.	Cyclist	Syd	Mos	LA	Man	Points
1.	Rafat Ratajczvk (POL)			6	12	18
2.	Vasil Kiryienka (BLR)	12	6			18
3.	Wim Stroetinga (NED)	8		10		18
4.	(United Kingdom) Russel Hampton(HPM)			12	1	13
5.	Ivan Kovalev (RUS)		12			12
6.	Walter Pérez (ARG)			8	4	12
7.	(Germany) Roger Kluge(NZL)				10	10
8.	Mitchell Docker (AUS)		10			10
9.	Giuseppe Atzeni (SUI)	10				10
10.	(United States) Charles Bradley Huff(TIA)			2	8	10

=== sprint ===
Pos.	Cyclist	Syd	Mos	LA	Man	Points
1.	Craig MacLean (GBR)	12	8			20
2.	Ross Edgar (GBR)	10		8		18
3.	Grégory Baugé (FRA)		4	12		16
4.	Chris Hoy (GBR)			6	10	16
5.	Mark French (AUS)	7	6		3	16
6.	Arnaud Tournant (FRA)	2			12	14
7.	Mickaël Bourgain (FRA)		5		8	13
8.	Theo Bos (NED)		12			12
9.	Roberto Chiappa (ITA)			10		10
10.	Stefan Nimke (GER)		10			10

=== team pursuit ===
Pos.	Cyclist	Syd	Mos	LA	Man	Points
1.	Russia (RUS)	12	10	8	10	40
2.	Ukraine (UKR)	8	7	12		27
3.	Great Britain (GBR)		6	7	12	25
4.	Denmark (DEN)	10	2	10	1	23
5.	New Zealand (NZL)	5	3	6	6	20
6.	Spain (ESP)	3	5	4	7	19
7.	Netherlands (NED)	7		3	4	14
8.	Recycling.co.uk(RCY)		12			12
9.	Germany (GER)	1	8	2		11
10.	Australia (AUS)	6			5	11

=== team sprint ===
Pos.	Cyclist	Syd	Mos	LA	Man	Points
1.	Great Britain (GBR)	12	12	12	12	48
2.	Germany (GER)	6	7	7	10	30
3.	France (FRA)	5	8	10		23
4.	Netherlands (NED)	10	10			20
5.	Japan (JPN)	1	6	4	6	17
6.	Science in Sport(SIS)	8		8		16
7.	Australia (AUS)	3		6	7	16
8.	Poland (POL)	4	3	5	1	13
9.	China (CHN)	2	5	3		10
10.	Southaustralia.com–AIS				8	8

== Women's overall results ==
=== 500m time trial ===
Pos.	Cyclist	Syd	Mos	LA	Man	Points
1.	Anna Meares (AUS)	12				12
2.	Simona Krupeckaitė (LTU)	10				10
3.	Yvonne Hijgenaar (NED)	8				8
4.	Natallia Tsylinskaya (BLR)	7				7
5.	Guo Shuang (CHN)	6				6
6.	Lyubov Shulika (UKR)	5				5
7.	Dana Gloss (GER)	4				4
8.	Tamilla Abassova (RUS)	3				3
9.	Virginie Cueff (FRA)	2				2
10.	Hsiao Mei-yu (TPE)	1				1

=== individual pursuit ===
Pos.	Cyclist	Syd	Mos	LA	Man	Points
1.	Katie Mactier (AUS)	12				12
2.	Wendy Houvenaghel (GBR)	10				10
3.	Vilija Sereikaitė (LTU)	8				8
4.	Alison Shanks (NZL)	7				7
5.	Lee Min-Hye (KOR)	6				6
6.	Yelyzaveta Bochkaryova (UKR)	5				5
7.	Lesya Kalytovska (UKR)	4				4
8.	Lada Kozlíková (CZE)	3				3
9.	Yulia Arustamova (RUS)	2				2
10.	Vera Koedooder (NED)	1				1

=== keirin ===
Pos.	Cyclist	Syd	Mos	LA	Man	Points
1.	Guo Shuang (CHN)	12				12
2.	Jennie Reed (USA)	10				10
3.	Dana Gloss (GER)	8				8
4.	Oksana Grishina (RUS)	7				7
5.	Anna Meares (AUS)	6				6
6.	Elisa Frisoni (ITA)	5				5
7.	Natallia Tsylinskaya (BLR)	4				4
8.	Clara Sanchez (FRA)	3				3
9.	Jane Gerisch (GER)	2				2
10.	Lyubov Shulika (UKR)	1				1

=== points race ===
Pos.	Cyclist	Syd	Mos	LA	Man	Points
1.	Katherine Bates (AUS)	12				12
2.	Giorgia Bronzini (ITA)	10				10
3.	Li Yan (CHN)	8				8
4.	Yulia Arustamova (RUS)	7				7
5.	Charlotte Becker (GER)	6				6
6.	Rochelle Gilmore (AUS)	5				5
7.	Catherine Cheatley (NZL)	4				4
8.	Lada Kozlíková (CZE)	3				3
9.	Alena Prudnikova (RUS)	2				2
10.	Wang Jianling (CHN)	1				1

=== scratch ===
Pos.	Cyclist	Syd	Mos	LA	Man	Points
1.	Vera Koedooder (NED)	12				12
2.	Charlotte Becker (GER)	10				10
3.	Alena Prudnikova (RUS)	8				8
4.	Yulia Arustamova (RUS)	7				7
5.	Rochelle Gilmore (AUS)	6				6
6.	Theresa Cliff-Ryan (USA)	5				5
7.	Leire Olaberria Dorronsoro (ESP)	4				4
8.	Pascale Jeuland (FRA)	3				3
9.	Wong Wan-yiu (HKG)	2				2
10.	Lada Kozlíková (CZE)	1				1

=== sprint ===
Pos.	Cyclist	Syd	Mos	LA	Man	Points
1.	Natallia Tsylinskaya (BLR)	12				12
2.	Victoria Pendleton (GBR)	10				10
3.	Clara Sanchez (FRA)	8				8
4.	Yvonne Hijgenaar (NED)	7				7
5.	Anna Meares (AUS)	6				6
6.	Guo Shuang (CHN)	5				5
7.	Simona Krupeckaitė (LTU)	4				4
8.	Jennie Reed (USA)	3				3
9.	Jane Gerisch (GER)	2				2
10.	Lyubov Shulika (UKR)	1				1

=== team sprint ===
Pos.	Cyclist	Syd	Mos	LA	Man	Points
1.	Australia (AUS)	12				12
2.	Germany (GER)	10				10
3.	France (FRA)	8				8
4.	Italy (ITA)	7				7
5.	Russia (RUS)	6				6
6.	South Korea (KOR)	5				5

== See also ==
- 2007 in track cycling
