= Artem Topchanyuk =

Ukrainian bicycle racer

Personal information
- Full name: Artem Topchanyuk
- Born: 27 January 1989 (age 37)

Cycling career
- Sport: Cycling
- Discipline: Road
- Role: Rider

Professional teams
- 2009–2011: ISD Sport Donetsk
- 2012: SP Tableware
- 2013–2014: Amore & Vita
- 2015: Tuşnad Cycling Team
- 2019: Ferei Pro Cycling

Artem Topchanyuk (Ukrainian: Артем Топчанюк; born 27 January 1989) is a Ukrainian road racing cyclist, who last rode for UCI Continental team Ferei Pro Cycling.

== Major results ==
2010
National Road Championships

1st Hill climb
1st Under-23 road race

7th Overall Tour of Szeklerland
2011
3rd Memorial Oleg Dyachenko
3rd Golan II
4th Road race, UEC European Under-23 Road Championships
5th Overall Cycling Tour of Sibiu
8th Golan I
2012
3rd Overall Cycling Tour of Sibiu
4th Overall Five Rings of Moscow
6th Circuit d'Alger
2014
2nd Overall Tour of Arad
2015
3rd Overall Tour de Serbie
3rd Odessa Grand Prix 1
