= Andriy Kulyk =

Ukrainian cyclist (born 1989)

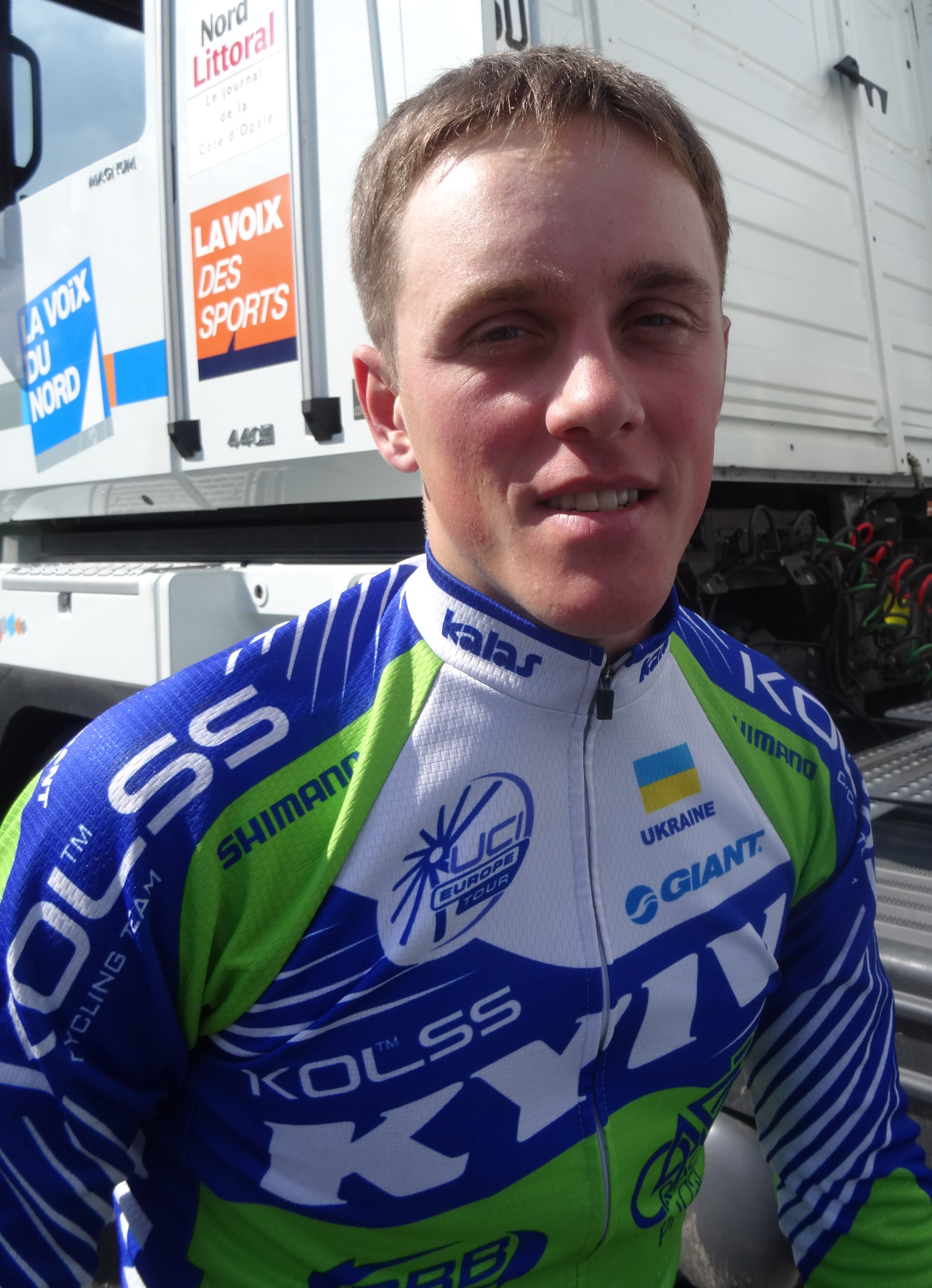
- Kulyk in 2014

Personal information
- Full name: Andriy Kulyk
- Born: 30 August 1989 (age 37): Sumy, Ukrainian SSR, Soviet Union; (now Ukraine)

Cycling career
- Sport: Cycling
- Discipline: Road
- Role: Rider

Amateur team
- 2020: Antalya Gençlik Spor Kulübü

Professional teams
- 2008: Danieli
- 2012–2017: Kolss Cycling Team
- 2018–2019: Beijing XDS–Innova Cycling Team
- 2020: Yunnan Lvshan Landscape

Andriy Kulyk (born 30 August 1989) is a Ukrainian cyclist, who most recently rode for UCI Continental team Yunnan Lvshan Landscape.

== Personal life ==
Kulyk was born in Sumy. His father, Oleksandr Kulyk, was the former manager of the Ukrainian national cycling team; he was killed in March 2022 during the Russian invasion of Ukraine.

== Major results ==
2010
1st Stage 6 Bałtyk–Karkonosze Tour
2011
8th Central European Tour Budapest GP
2012
Tour of Romania

1st Stages 2, 4 & 6

6th Central European Tour Budapest GP
9th Central European Tour Miskolc GP
2013
4th Central European Tour Budapest GP
8th Overall Baltic Chain Tour
2014
1st Stage 5 Okolo Slovenska
2nd Grand Prix of Moscow
7th Overall Tour of China II
7th Race Horizon Park 2
2015
1st Overall Baltic Chain Tour

1st Stage 2

1st Stage 1 Szlakiem Grodów Piastowskich
7th Korona Kocich Gór
8th Overall Tour of China II
8th Memoriał Romana Siemińskiego
9th Memorial Grundmanna I Wizowskiego
10th Sochi Cup
2016
1st GP Slovakia
1st Stage 2a (TTT) Tour of Ukraine
2017
1st Stage 2 Bałtyk–Karkonosze Tour
Visegrad 4 Bicycle Race

4th GP Slovakia
9th GP Czech Republic

5th Memoriał Henryka Łasaka
2019
1st Road race, National Road Championships
3rd Grand Prix Velo Alanya
5th Minsk Cup
2020
5th Grand Prix Side
7th Grand Prix Mount Erciyes
10th GP Antalya
2021
3rd Road race, National Road Championships
3rd GP Manavgat
10th Grand Prix Gazipaşa
