= Ukrainian National Road Race Championships =

National road cycling championship in Ukraine

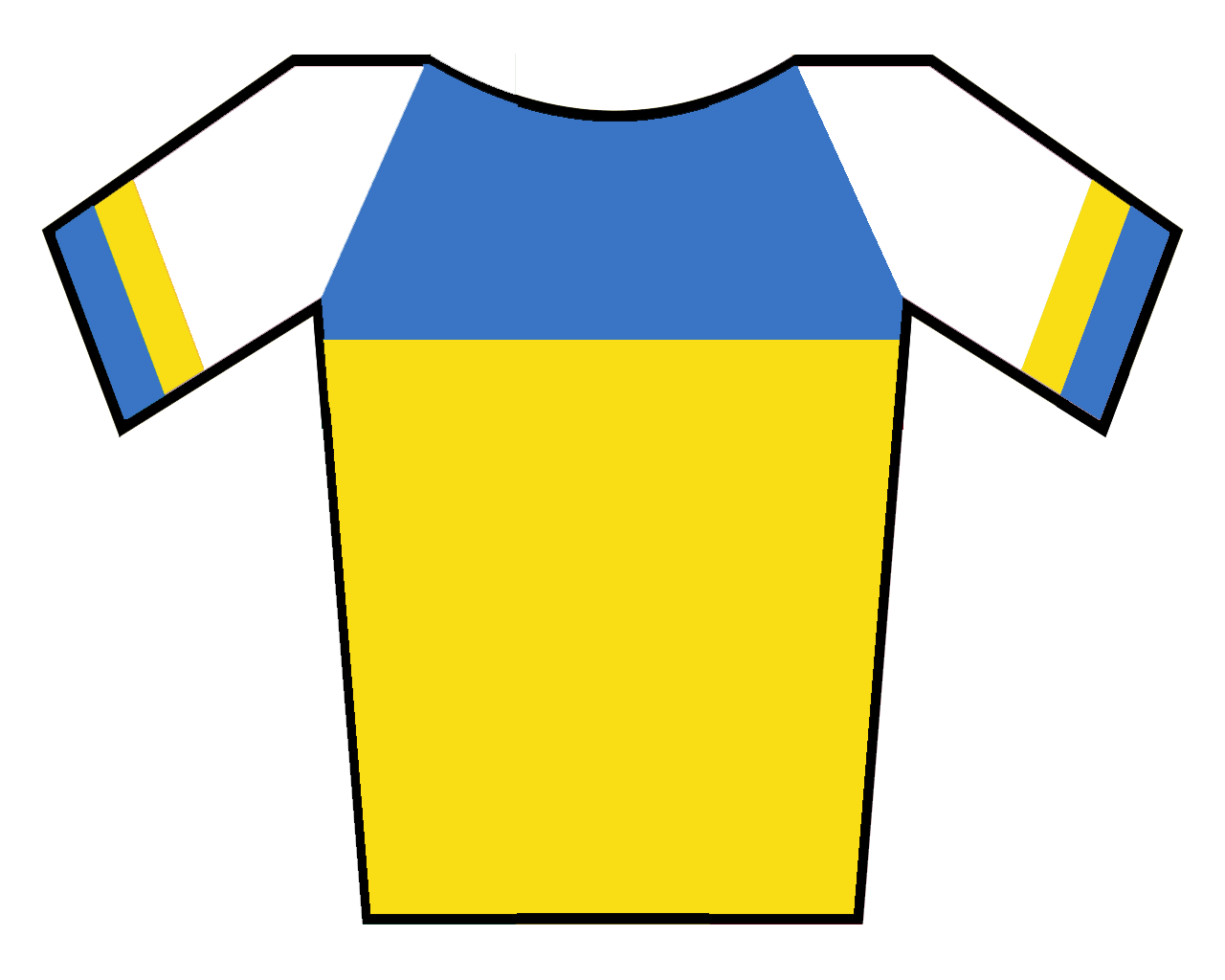
- The champion's jersey

Race details
- Date: June
- Discipline: Road
- Type: One-day race
- Organiser: Ukrainian Cycling Federation

History
- First edition: 1992

The Ukrainian National Road Race Championships have been held since 1992.

== Men ==
=== Elite ===
Year	Gold	Silver	Bronze
1992	Vladimir Poulnikov	Evgueni Zagrebelny	Oleg Petrovich Chuzhda
1996	Oleg Pankov	Mikhaylo Khalilov	Alexandre Markovnitchenko
1997	Yuri Prokopenko	Andreï Korolev	Serguei Bodatchiov
1998	Vladimir Duma	Vasiliy Zaika	Dimitri Schipak
1999	Oleksandr Fedenko	Oleg Pankov	Ruslan Pidhornyy
2000	Vladimir Duma	Volodymir Gustov	Valeriy Kobzarenko
2001	Kyrylo Pospyeyev	Sergiej Sawieliew	Serguei Avdeev
2002	Oleksandr Klymenko	Ruslan Pidhornyy	Alexis Nakazniy
2003	Serhiy Honchar	Sergiy Matveyev	Maksym Rudenko
2004	Oleg Ruban	Vladimir Duma	Denys Kostyuk
2005	Mikhaylo Khalilov	Roman Luhovyy	Oleksandr Kvachuk
2006	Vladimir Zagorodniy	Volodymyr Starchyk	Denys Kostyuk
2007	Vladimir Zagorodniy	Ruslan Pidhornyy	Mikhaylo Khalilov
2008	Ruslan Pidhornyy	Denys Kostyuk	Vladimir Zagorodniy
2009	Volodymyr Starchyk	Oleksandr Kvachuk	Ruslan Pidhornyy
2010	Vitaly Popkov	Ruslan Pidhornyy	Oleksandr Sheydyk
2011	Oleksandr Kvachuk	Anatoliy Pakhtusov	Oleksandr Polivoda
2012	Andriy Hrivko	Dmytro Krivtsov	Oleksandr Polivoda
2013	Denys Kostyuk	Vitaliy Buts	Vladimir Zagorodniy
2014	Vitaliy Buts	Denys Kostyuk	Dmytro Krivtsov
2015	Mykhaylo Kononenko	Denys Kostyuk	Oleksandr Polivoda
2016	Oleksandr Polivoda	Vitaliy Buts	Denys Kostyuk
2017	Vitaliy Buts	Andrii Bratashchuk	Oleksandr Polivoda
2018	Oleksandr Polivoda	Andrii Bratashchuk	Maksym Vasilyev
2019	Andriy Kulyk	Oleksandr Polivoda	Mykhaylo Kononenko
2020	Mykhaylo Kononenko	Anatoliy Budyak	Oleksandr Golovash
2021	Andrii Ponomar	Anatoliy Budyak	Andriy Kulyk
2022	Not held due to the 2022 Russian invasion of Ukraine		
2023	Maksym Bilyi	Anatoliy Budyak	Sergiy Sydor
2024	Serhii Sydor	Anatoliy Budyak	Daniil Yakovlev
2025	Heorhii Antonenko	Mykola Hovorun	Bogdan Hovorun

=== U23 ===
Year	Gold	Silver	Bronze
2006	Vitali Kondrut	Andriy Buchko	Dmitroy Krivtsov
2009	Igor Dementev	Dimitri Chuzhda	Artem Topchanyuk
2010	Artem Topchanyuk	Maksym Vasilyev	Artem Tesler
2011	Evgen Filin	Anatoly Sosnitsky	Oleksandr Prevar
2012	Oleksandr Golovash	Maksym Vasilyev	Marlen Zmorka
2013	Mykhailo Polykarpov	Vladislav Bakumenko	Roman Buzile
2014	Valerii Taradai	Roman Buzile	Mykhailo Polykarpov
2015	Sergiy Kozachenko	Ilya Klepikov	Timur Maleev
2016	Timur Maleev	Valerii Taradai	Rinat Udod
2017	Vladyslav Soltasiuk	Anatoliy Budyak	Timur Maleev
2018	Oleksandr Shevchenko	Daniil Nikulin	Vladyslav Soltasiuk
2019	Vladyslav Soltasiuk	Vitaliy Novakovskyi	Bogdan Musiyenko
2020	Kirilo Tsarenko	Maksim Bilyi	Oleksandr Shchypak
2021	Maksim Bilyi	Daniil Nikulin	Oleksandr Shevchenko
2022	Not held due to the 2022 Russian invasion of Ukraine		
2023	Maksym Bilyi	Sergiy Sydor	Denys Khotulov
2024	Serhii Sydor	Mykhailo Basaraba	Andriy Zozulia
2025	Not held		

== Women ==
Year	Gold	Silver	Bronze
1992	Natalja Yuganiuk	Elena Ogui	Natalja Kistchuk
1995	Natalja Kistchuk	Yulia Murenkaia	Elena Ogui
1996	Tamara Polyakova	Valentyna Karpenko	Natalja Kistchuk
1997	Yevheniya Vysotska	Yulia Murenkaia	Natalja Kistchuk
1998	Tamara Polyakova	Natalja Kistchuk	Olga Svirtchuk
1999	Ganna Bogoluzkaya	Tamara Polyakova	Natalja Kistchuk
2000	Oksana Saprykina	Valentyna Karpenko	Iryna Chuzhynova-Denisiuk
2001	Tetyana Styazhkina	Tatiana Andriutchenko	Natalja Kistchuk
2002	Valentyna Karpenko	Tetyana Styazhkina	Natalja Kachalka
2003	Natalja Kachalka	Valentyna Karpenko	Iryna Chuzhynova-Denisiuk
2005	Valentyna Karpenko	Svitlana Semchuk	Nina Ovcharenco
2006	Yelizaveta Bochkaryova	Nadya Savkina	Iryna Shpylyova
2007	Yelizaveta Bochkaryova	Oksana Kashchyshyna	Iryna Shpylyova
2008	Tetyana Styazhkina	Oksana Kashchyshyna	Yevheniya Vysotska
2009	Yevheniya Vysotska	Nina Ovcharenco	Oksana Kashchyshyna
2010	Nina Ovcharenco	Svitlana Halyuk	Lesya Kalytovska
2011	Tetyana Ryabchenko	Yelizaveta Bochkaryova	Yevheniya Vysotska
2012	Alyona Andruk	Nina Ovcharenco	Ivana Borovichenko
2013	Elizaveta Oshurkova	Yevheniya Vysotska	Anna Nahirna
2014	Tetyana Ryabchenko	Valeriya Kononenko	Maryna Ivaniuk
2015	Tetyana Ryabchenko	Olena Demydova	Hanna Solovey
2016	Yevheniya Vysotska	Tetyana Ryabchenko	Hanna Solovey
2017	Yevheniya Vysotska	Tetyana Ryabchenko	Olga Shekel
2018	Olga Shekel	Iryna Semenova	Valeriya Kononenko
2019	Olga Shekel	Valeriya Kononenko	Olena Sharha
2020	Anna Nahirna	Olga Shekel	Olena Sharha
2021			
2022	Not held due to the 2022 Russian invasion of Ukraine		
2023	Maryna Altukhova	Yuliia Biriukova	Olha Kulynych
2024	Olga Shekel	Maryna Altukhova	Valeriya Kononenko
2025	Yuliia Biriukova	Olga Shekel	Maryna Altukhova

== See also ==
- Ukrainian National Time Trial Championships
- National road cycling championships
