= Oleksandr Kvachuk =

Ukrainian racing cyclist

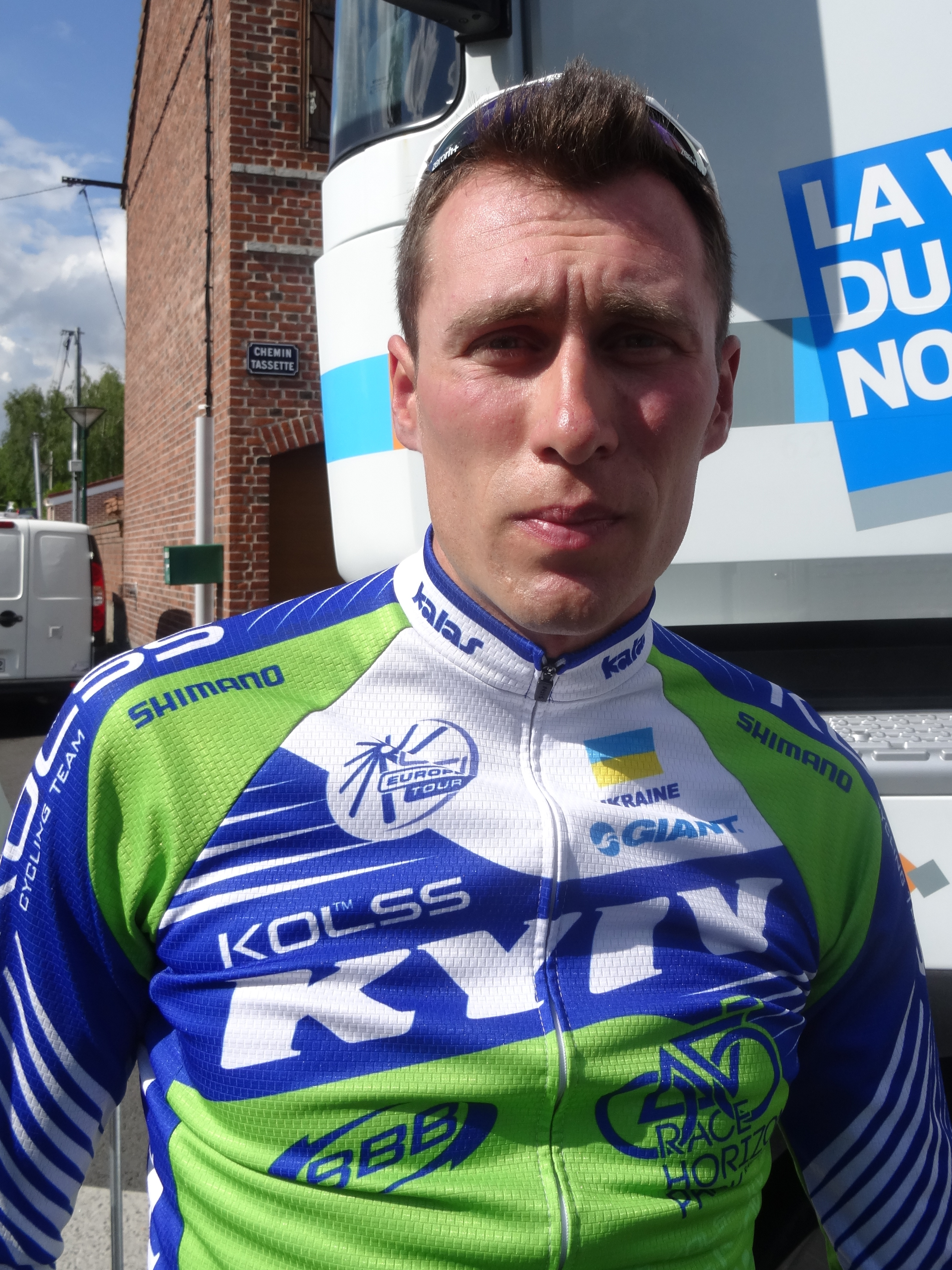
- Kvachuk during the Paris-Arras Tour 2014.

Personal information
- Full name: Oleksandr Kvachuk
- Born: 23 July 1983 (age 43): Oleksandriia, Ukrainian SSR, Soviet Union; (now Ukraine)

Cycling career
- Sport: Cycling
- Current team: Retired
- Discipline: Road
- Role: Rider
- Rider type: Puncheur; Time-trialist

Professional teams
- 2004–2005: Lampre
- 2006–2008: Selle Italia–Diquigiovanni
- 2009–2010: ISD
- 2011–2012: Lampre–ISD
- 2013–2014: Kolss Cycling Team

Major wins
- One-Day Races and Classics National Road Race Championships (2011) National Time Trial Championships (2011)

Oleksandr Kvachuk (Ukrainian: Олександр Квачук; born 23 July 1983) is a Ukrainian former racing cyclist, who rode professionally between 2004 and 2014 for the Diquigiovanni–Androni, ISD–NERI, Lampre–ISD and Kolss Cycling Team squads.

== Major results ==
2001
UCI Junior Road World Championships

1st Road race
2nd Time trial

1st Overall Giro della Lunigiana
2002
9th Time trial, UEC European Under-23 Road Championships
2005
3rd Road race, National Road Championships
5th Firenze–Pistoia
2006
7th Overall Tour de l'Avenir
2007
1st Mountains classification Vuelta a Navarra
3rd Overall The Paths of King Nikola
4th Overall Vuelta a Cuba
6th Firenze–Pistoia
8th Overall Tour of Qinghai Lake
2008
10th Overall Ronde de l'Oise
2009
National Road Championships

2nd Road race
3rd Time trial

2011
National Road Championships

1st Road race
1st Time trial

2013
1st Prologue (TTT) Tour of Romania
2014
3rd Race Horizon Park 2
8th Overall Tour of Iran
9th Overall Tour of Szeklerland
