= Alexander Khatuntsev =

Russian cyclist

Personal information
- Full name: Alexander Khatuntsev
- Born: 11 February 1985 (age 41) Voronezh, Soviet Union

Cycling career
- Sport: Cycling
- Disciplines: Road; Track
- Role: Rider

Professional teams
- 2004: Moscow City Sports
- 2005–2006: Omnibike Dynamo Moscow
- 2007: Unibet.com
- 2008: Tinkoff Credit Systems
- 2009–2010: Moscow
- 2012: RusVelo

Major wins
- Russia Road Race Championship (2006)

Alexander Khatuntsev (born 11 February 1985) is a Russian former professional road bicycle racer. For his final season as a professional in 2012, he rode for UCI Professional Continental Team RusVelo. Khatuntsev has also rode for Unibet.com and Tinkoff Credit Systems.

== Major results ==
2002
1st Team pursuit, UCI Junior Track World Championships (with Mikhail Ignatiev, Serguei Ulakov & Ilya Krestianinov)
2003
1st Individual pursuit, UCI Junior Track World Championships
1st Individual pursuit, UEC European Junior Track Championships
2nd Team pursuit, UEC European Under-23 Track Championships
2004
1st Overall Tour of South China Sea

1st Stages 1 & 6

1st Mountains classification, Tour Nord-Isère
3rd Team pursuit, UEC European Under-23 Track Championships
2005
1st Team pursuit, UEC European Under-23 Track Championships
1st Overall GP Sochi

1st Stages 1, 4 & 5

1st Boucles de la Soule
2nd Grand Prix of Moscow
8th Overall Tour de Serbie
2006
1st Road race, National Road Championships
1st Overall Tour of South China Sea

1st Young rider classification
1st Stages 3 & 6

1st Overall Five Rings of Moscow

1st Stage 4

1st Grand Prix of Moscow
1st Boucle de l'Artois
1st Stage 1 Tour of Hainan
2nd Team pursuit, UEC European Under-23 Track Championships
2nd Overall GP Sochi

1st Stages 1, 2 & 5

2nd Overall Tour de Normandie
3rd Road race, UCI World Under-23 Road Championships
3rd Overall Tour de Serbie

1st Stage 5

3rd Memorial Cimurri
3rd E.O.S. Tallinn GP
2007
3nd Route Adélie
6th Circuito de Getxo
2009
1st Grand Prix of Moscow
4th Overall Five Rings of Moscow

1st Stage 4

7th Grand Prix of Donetsk
