= Vitaliy Buts =

Ukrainian cyclist (born 1986)

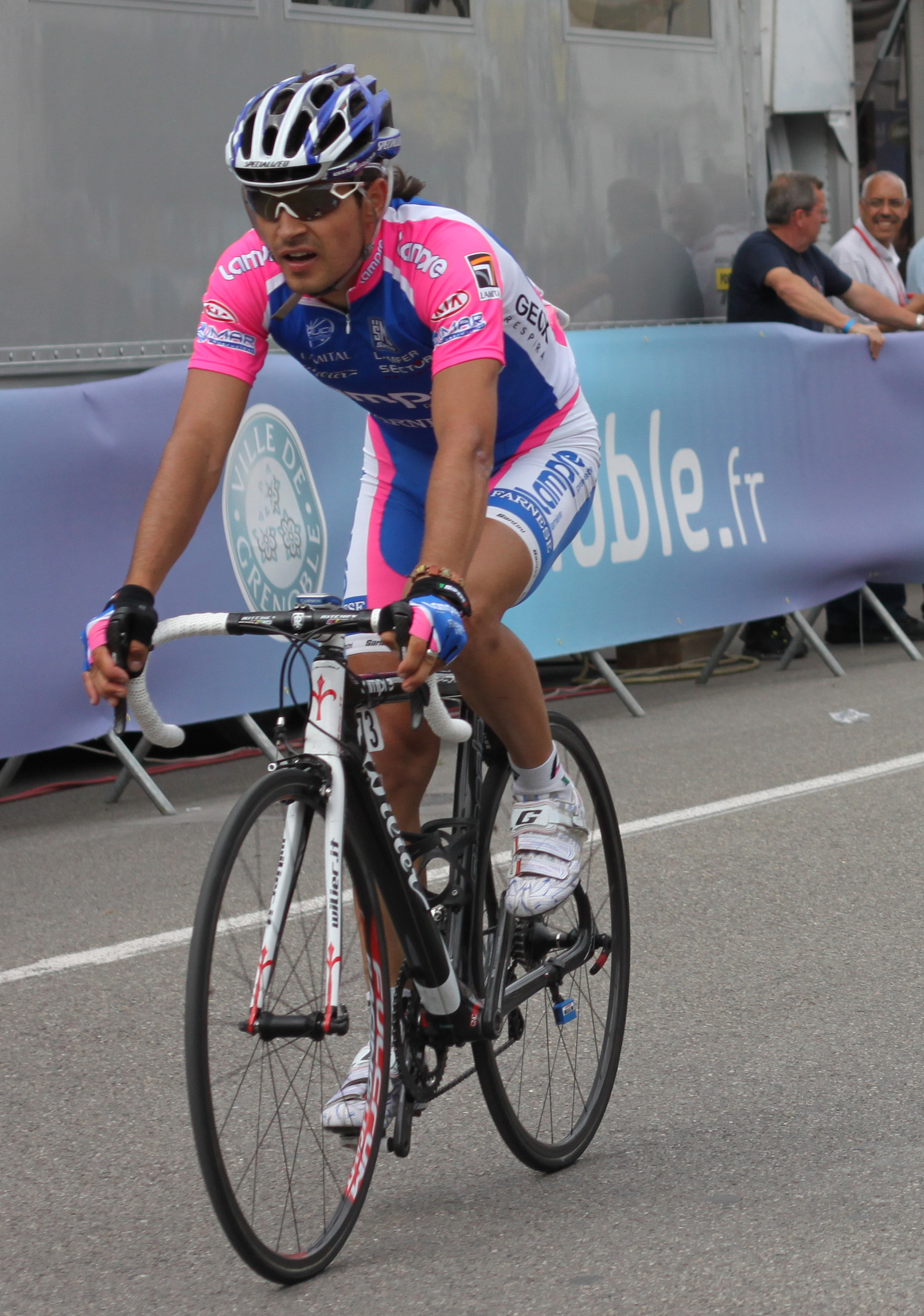
- Buts at the 2010 Critérium du Dauphiné

Personal information
- Full name: Vitaliy Nikolayevich Buts; Russian: Виталий Николаевич Буц
- Born: 24 October 1986 (age 39) Mykolaiv, Ukrainian SSR (now Ukraine)
- Height: 1.77 m (5 ft 10 in)
- Weight: 68 kg (150 lb; 10.7 st)

Cycling career
- Sport: Cycling
- Current team: UAE Development Team
- Discipline: Road
- Role: Rider (retired); Mechanic

Professional teams
- 2009–2012: Lampre–NGC
- 2013–2017: Kolss Cycling Team
- 2018: Team Hurom
- 2019: Kyiv Capital Team
- 2020: Shenzhen Xidesheng Cycling Team
- 2021–2022: Salcano–Sakarya BB Team

Managerial team
- 2023–: UAE Development Team

Major wins
- One-day races and Classics National Road Race Championships (2014, 2017)

Vitaliy Nikolayevich Buts (born 24 November 1986) is a Ukrainian former road bicycle racer, who rode professionally between 2009 and 2022 for five professional teams. During his career, Buts took five professional victories including two wins at the Ukrainian National Road Race Championships.

Following his retirement, Buts works as a mechanic for UCI Women's Continental team UAE Development Team.

== Major results ==
2006
1st Trofeo Lampre Bernareggio
3rd Coppa Città di Lonigo
3rd Palazzolo Milanese
3rd Gran Premio Sannazzaro
2007
1st Circuito Guazzorese
1st Stage 1 Giro Ciclistico Pesche Nettarine di Romagna
2nd Coppa Comune di Piubega
2nd Legnano Coppa Olivetti
2nd Trofeo Torino-Biella
2nd Trofeo Sportivi Magnaghesi
3rd Trofeo Antonietto Rancilio
3rd Gran Premio Sannazzaro
9th Road race, UCI Under-23 Road World Championships
2008
1st Overall Giro delle Regioni

1st Stage 6

1st Boucles de la Soule
1st Coppa Comune di Piubega
1st Palazzolo Milanese
1st Ronde du Pays Basque
2nd Milano-Busseto
2nd Castello Brianza
2nd Memorial Angelo Fumagalli
2nd Medaglia d'Oro Consorzio Marmisti Valpantena
2nd Trofeo Broglia Marzé Quintino Soprana Baltigati
3rd Circuit de la Nive
3rd Trofeo Giacomo Larghi
3rd Trofeo S.C. Marcallo Casone
5th Trofeo Franco Balestra
7th Gran Premio Palio del Recioto
8th Coppa San Geo
9th Gran Premio della Liberazione
2009
3rd Overall Tour of Hainan

1st Stage 1

2013
1st Overall Tour of Romania

1st Stages 1 (TTT) & 5

1st Overall Grand Prix of Sochi

1st Stage 4

1st Mayor Cup
Five Rings of Moscow

1st Points classification
1st Stage 1

2nd Road race, National Road Championships
4th Race Horizon Park 2
5th Overall Tour of Taihu Lake
5th Grand Prix of Donetsk
6th Overall Grand Prix of Adygeya

1st Stage 3

7th Overall Tour of Szeklerland

1st Points classification
1st Stage 1

8th Overall Tour of Bulgaria

1st Stage 1b

2014
1st Road race, National Road Championships
1st Race Horizon Park 1
2nd Overall Tour d'Azerbaïdjan

1st Points classification

2nd Overall Tour of China I

1st Stage 4

2nd Central European Tour Ibrány GP
4th Race Horizon Park 3
4th Central European Tour Budapest GP
5th Overall Grand Prix of Adygeya
6th Overall Grand Prix of Sochi

1st Stage 5

6th Central European Tour Košice–Miskolc
10th Overall Tour of China II

1st Mountains classification

2015
1st Overall Black Sea Cycling Tour

1st Points classification
1st Stages 1 & 2

1st Odessa Grand Prix 2
1st Grand Prix of Vinnytsia
2nd Overall Tour of Mersin

1st Points classification
1st Stage 4

2nd Overall Tour of Małopolska
2nd Race Horizon Park Classic
2nd Memoriał Henryka Łasaka
3rd Overall Course de Solidarność et des Champions Olympiques
3rd Krasnodar–Anapa
3rd Memorial Oleg Dyachenko
4th Overall Tour of Yancheng Coastal Wetlands
4th Coupe des Carpathes
5th Overall Tour of Taihu Lake
5th Moscow Cup
5th Race Horizon Park Maidan
5th Puchar Ministra Obrony Narodowej
6th Odessa Grand Prix 1
2016
1st Belgrade Banjaluka I
1st Race Horizon Park for Peace
1st Stage 6 Tour of Bulgaria
2nd Road race, National Road Championships
2nd Overall Tour of Ukraine

1st Stage 2a (TTT)

2nd Overall Okolo Slovenska
2nd Belgrade Banjaluka II
2nd Odessa Grand Prix
3rd Overall Tour of Qinghai Lake

1st Stage 4

4th Race Horizon Park Classic
5th Tour de Ribas
7th Memoriał Romana Siemińskiego
2017
1st Road race, National Road Championships
1st Overall Tour of Ukraine

1st Points classification
1st Stages 1 & 2 (TTT)

1st Overall Tour of Bulgaria South

1st Stages 1, 2 & 3

2nd Odessa Grand Prix
4th Overall Tour of Taihu Lake
4th Race Horizon Park Maidan
5th Race Horizon Park Classic
6th Overall Tour of Bulgaria North
8th Race Horizon Park for Peace
9th Overall Tour d'Azerbaïdjan
10th Visegrad 4 Bicycle Race – GP Polski
2018
1st Stage 2 Tour of Małopolska
5th Grand Prix Doliny Baryczy Milicz
6th Memoriał Romana Siemińskiego
7th Overall Course de Solidarność et des Champions Olympiques
7th Memoriał Andrzeja Trochanowskiego
8th Memorial Grundmanna I Wizowskiego
2019
2nd Tour de Ribas
2nd Horizon Park Race Maidan
3rd Overall Tour of Black Sea
4th Overall Tour of Małopolska
4th Chabany Race
4th Grand Prix Velo Alanya
5th Road race, European Games
6th Horizon Park Race for Peace
6th Grand Prix Justiniano Hotels
7th Horizon Park Race Classic
8th Odessa Grand Prix
2020
1st Grand Prix Velo Erciyes
2nd Grand Prix Central Anatolia
3rd Grand Prix Cappadocia
5th Grand Prix Develi
6th GP Manavgat
7th GP Antalya
8th Grand Prix Gazipaşa
8th Grand Prix World's Best High Altitude
2021
1st Mountains classification, Presidential Tour of Turkey
4th Road race, National Road Championships
4th Grand Prix Erciyes
5th Overall Tour of Mevlana
6th Grand Prix Velo Erciyes
10th Grand Prix Gündoğmuş
2022
2nd Grand Prix Develi
6th Grand Prix Tomarza
8th Overall Tour of Sakarya

1st Points classification
