= Anatoliy Pakhtusov =

Ukrainian cyclist

Personal information
- Born: 17 April 1985 (age 41) Myrne, Donetsk Oblast, Soviet Union (now Ukraine)

Cycling career
- Sport: Cycling
- Current team: Retired
- Discipline: Road
- Role: Rider

Professional team
- 2009–2016: ISD Sport Donetsk

Anatoliy Pakhtusov (born 17 April 1985 in Mirnoye) is a Ukrainian former professional cyclist, who rode professionally between 2009 and 2016, entirely for the ISD–Jorbi team.

== Major results ==
2006
8th Memorial Oleg Dyachenko
2007
9th Gran Premio Industrie del Marmo
2008
3rd Overall Giro della Valle d'Aosta

1st Stage 1

6th Trofeo Città di Castelfidardo
9th Piccolo Giro di Lombardia
2009
5th Coupe des Carpathes
7th Tartu GP
8th Memorial Oleg Dyachenko
9th Grand Prix of Donetsk
2011
2nd Road race, National Road Championships
2nd Overall An Post Rás
4th Mayor Cup
6th Memorial Oleg Dyachenko
8th Overall Tour of Szeklerland
2012
2nd Overall Tour of Szeklerland

1st Stage 2

2nd Puchar Ministra Obrony Narodowej
3rd Overall Grand Prix of Sochi

1st Stage 1

4th Memorial Oleg Dyachenko
9th Race Horizon Park
2013
1st Grand Prix of Donetsk
5th Race Horizon Park 2
6th Overall Grand Prix of Sochi
6th Overall Baltic Chain Tour
7th Overall Tour d'Azerbaïdjan
7th Race Horizon Park 1
8th Central European Tour Miskolc GP
10th Overall Sibiu Cycling Tour
2014
6th Overall Five Rings of Moscow
7th Memorial Oleg Dyachenko
7th Memoriał Henryka Łasaka
9th Overall Course de la Solidarité Olympique
9th Race Horizon Park 3
10th Race Horizon Park 2
2015
2nd Grand Prix of Vinnytsia
3rd Horizon Park Race for Peace
4th Overall Okolo Slovenska
7th Horizon Park Classic
