= Vitaly Popkov (cyclist) =

Ukrainian cyclist

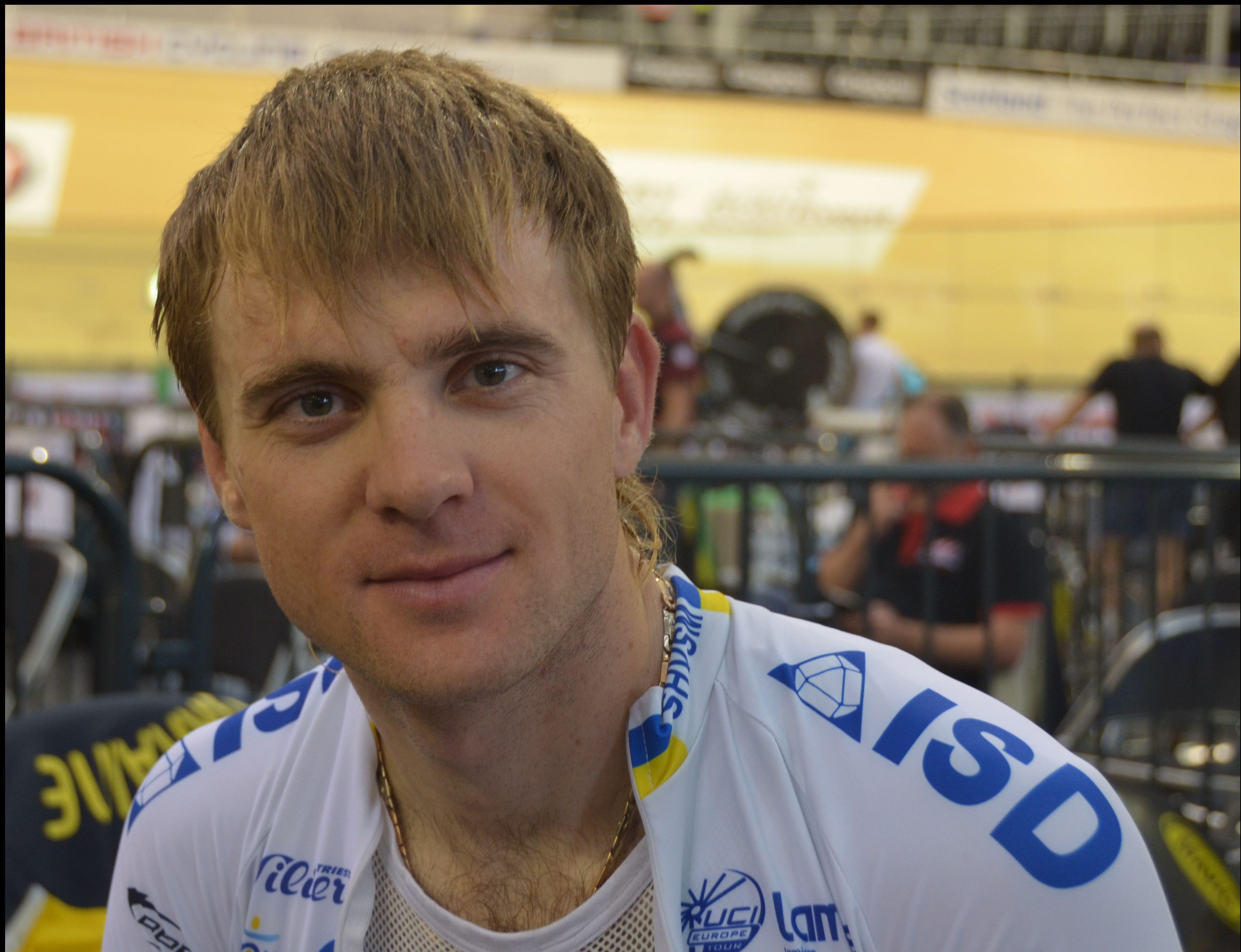

Personal information
- Full name: Vitaly Popkov; Ukrainian: Віталій Попков
- Born: 16 June 1983 (age 43): Novoselytsia Raion, Ukrainian SSR, Soviet Union; (now Ukraine)

Cycling career
- Sport: Cycling
- Disciplines: Road; Track
- Role: Rider

Amateur team
- 2018–2019: Crimea Region

Professional teams
- 2007–2014: ISD Sport Donetsk
- 2016–2017: Team Lvshan Landscape
Medal record
Representing Ukraine
Men's track cycling
World Championships
Silver medal – second place	2007 Palma de Mallorca	Team pursuit

Vitaly Popkov (Ukrainian: Віталій Попков; born 16 June 1983) is a former Ukrainian-born Russian racing cyclist, who last rode for Russian amateur team Crimea Region.

== Major results ==
=== Track ===
2002
1st Team pursuit, UEC European Under-23 Championships
2nd Team pursuit, UCI World Cup Classics, Moscow
2003
1st Team pursuit, UEC European Under-23 Championships
1st Team pursuit, UCI World Cup Classics, Cape Town
2004
1st Team pursuit, UEC European Under-23 Championships
1st Team pursuit, 2004–05 UCI Track Cycling World Cup Classics, Moscow
2nd Team pursuit, 2004 UCI Track Cycling World Cup Classics, Moscow
2005
2nd Team pursuit, UEC European Under-23 Championships
3rd Team pursuit, 2005–06 UCI Track Cycling World Cup Classics, Moscow
2006
2nd Team pursuit, 2005–06 UCI Track Cycling World Cup Classics, Sydney
2007
2006–07 UCI Track Cycling World Cup Classics, Los Angeles

1st Individual pursuit
1st Team pursuit

2nd Team pursuit, UCI World Championships
2008
3rd Team pursuit, 2007–08 UCI Track Cycling World Cup Classics, Los Angeles
2009
1st Individual pursuit, 2009–10 UCI Track Cycling World Cup Classics, Cali

=== Road ===
2003
1st Stage 2 Tour de Hongrie
2008
1st Stage 2 Tour de Ribas
2nd Kirschblütenrennen
2009
1st Overall Tour of Szeklerland

1st Stage 1

2nd Memorial Oleg Dyachenko
4th Grand Prix of Donetsk
4th Mayor Cup
4th GP E.O.S. Tallinn
2010
National Road Championships

1st Time trial
1st Road race

1st Overall Grand Prix of Adygeya

1st Prologue & Stage 3

1st Grand Prix of Donetsk
1st Rogaland GP
1st Grand Prix Jasnej Góry-Czestochowa
1st Grand Prix of Sochi
1st Stage 1 Tour of Szeklerland
3rd Overall Five Rings of Moscow

1st Stage 3

4th Mayor Cup
8th Route Adélie
9th Overall Course de la Solidarité Olympique
2011
5th Overall Tour of Szeklerland
2012
1st Overall Tour of Szeklerland
1st Grand Prix of Moscow
1st Race Horizon Park
1st Stage 6 Course de la Solidarité Olympique
1st Stage 4 (ITT) Dookoła Mazowsza
2013
1st Overall Course de la Solidarité Olympique

1st Points classification
1st Stage 1

1st Stage 3 Azerbaijan International Cycling Tour
2nd Overall Grand Prix of Adygeya

1st Stage 2

2nd Overall Tour of Szeklerland

1st Stage 3 (ITT)

3rd Overall Grand Prix of Sochi

1st Stage 1

3rd Košice–Miskolc
7th Grand Prix of Donetsk
2014
9th Memorial Oleg Dyachenko
