= Black Sea Cycling Tour =

Cycling race held in Bulgaria

Race details
- Region: Bulgaria
- Discipline: Road
- Competition: UCI Europe Tour 2.2
- Type: Stage race

History
- First edition: 2015
- Editions: 1
- First winner: Vitaly Buts (UKR)
- Most wins: No repeat winners
- Most recent: Vitaly Buts (UKR)

The Black Sea Cycling Tour is a cycling race held in Bulgaria. It is part of UCI Europe Tour in category 2.2.

== Winners ==
Year	Country	Rider	Team
2015	Ukraine	Vitaly Buts	Kolss BDC Team
