= Valery Valynin =

Russian cyclist

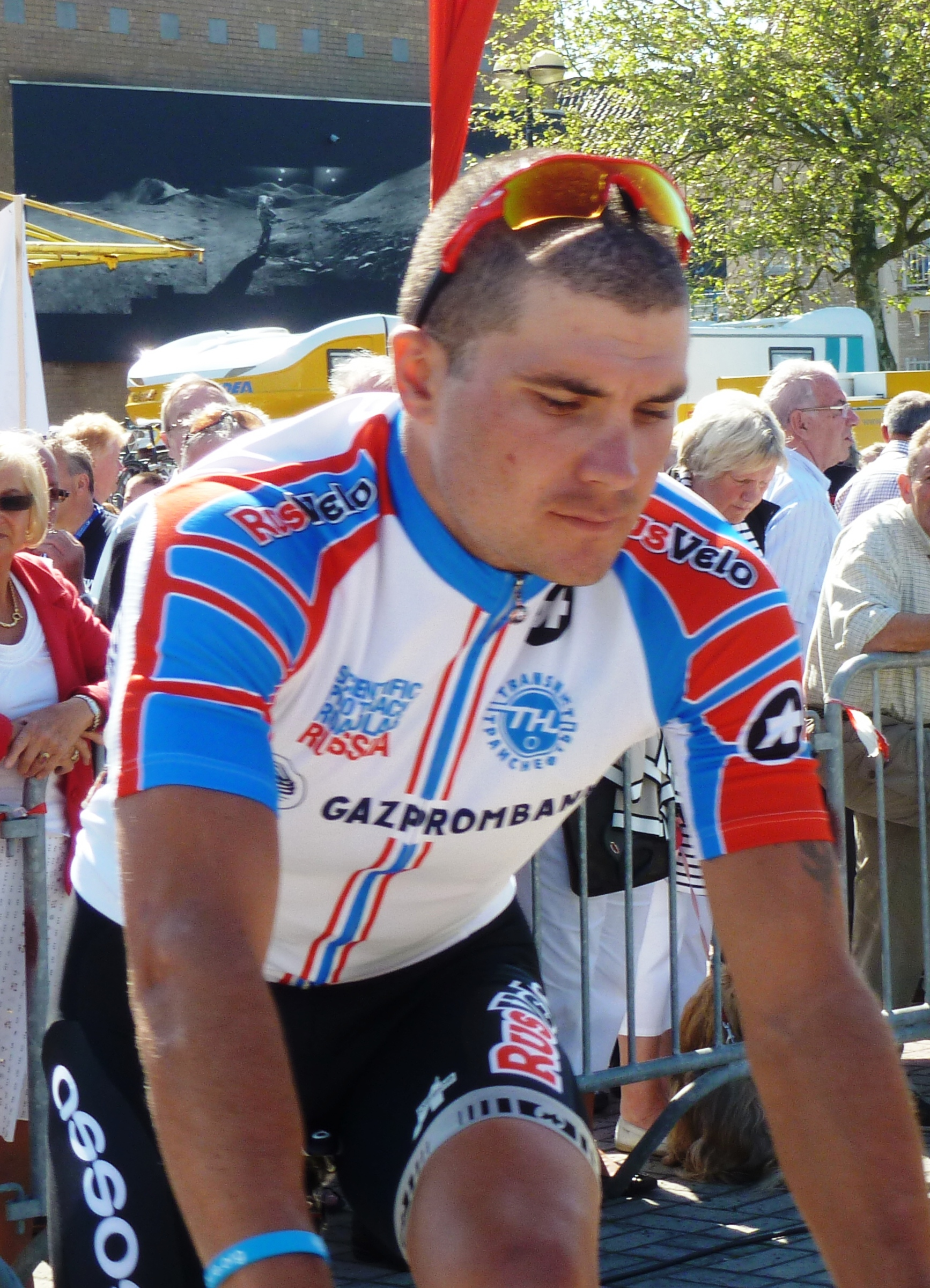

Personal information
- Born: 10 December 1986 (age 39) Krasnodar, Russia

Cycling career
- Sport: Cycling
- Discipline: Road
- Role: Rider

Professional teams
- 2006–2007: Omnibike Dynamo Moscow
- 2008: Katyusha
- 2009–2010: Moscow
- 2012: RusVelo

Valery Valynin (born 10 December 1986 in Krasnodar) is a Russian cyclist.

== Palmares ==
2006
2nd Tallinn-Tartu GP
2007
1st Stage 3 Five Rings of Moscow
2009
2nd Mayor Cup
2010
2nd Grand Prix of Moscow
3rd Overall Grand Prix of Adygea
