= Oleg Pankov =

Ukrainian cyclist

Personal information
- Born: 2 August 1967 (age 59) Melitopol, Soviet Union

Cycling career
- Sport: Cycling
- Current team: Retired
- Discipline: Road
- Role: Rider

Professional teams
- 1996: Tönissteiner–Saxon
- 1997: RDM–Asfra
- 1998–1999: Ipso–Euroclean
- 2000–2001: Collstrop–De Federale Verzekeringen

Oleg Pankov (born 2 August 1967) is a Ukrainian former professional road cyclist. He finished 43rd in the road race at the 1996 Summer Olympics. He also won the Ukrainian National Road Race Championships in 1996.

== Major results ==
1993
3rd Overall Tour du Maroc
1996
1st Road race, National Road Championships
1st Stage 8 Rheinland-Pfalz Rundfahrt
1997
2nd Leeuwse Pijl
10th Grote Prijs Jef Scherens
1998
10th Brussels–Ingooigem
1999
2nd Road race, National Road Championships
2000
4th Rund um Düren
8th Omloop van het Waasland
10th Omloop van de Vlaamse Scheldeboorden
2001
5th Grand Prix Pino Cerami
