= Oleksandr Kulyk =

Ukrainian cycling coach (1957–2022)

Oleksandr Vasylovich Kulyk (Ukrainian: Олександр Васильович Кулик; 24 May 1957 – 1 March 2022) was a Ukrainian cycling coach and a 1988 Honored Coach of Ukraine. He died in battle on March 1, 2022, during the Russian invasion of Ukraine. Kulyk was born in 1957 in the village Seredyna-Buda in Sumy Oblast. In 1979, he graduated from the Kyiv State Institute of Physical Education. He is the father of Ukrainian cycling champion Andriy Kulyk.

While he was working in Sumy, he trained Oleksandr Kyrychenko, the Olympic champion of the 1988 Seoul Summer Olympics in the 1000-meter free standing as part of the USSR national team, as well as the silver medalist of the 2000 Sydney Olympic Games, Oleksandr Fedenko.

He worked as the director of the children's and youth sports school "Ukraine" of the organization "Sumbud" OJSC.

He died on March 1, 2022, in the battle near Nyzy in Sumy Oblast during the Russian invasion of Ukraine.

== See also ==
- List of Ukrainian sports figures killed during the Russo-Ukrainian war
