= Ruslan Pidhornyy =

Ukrainian cyclist

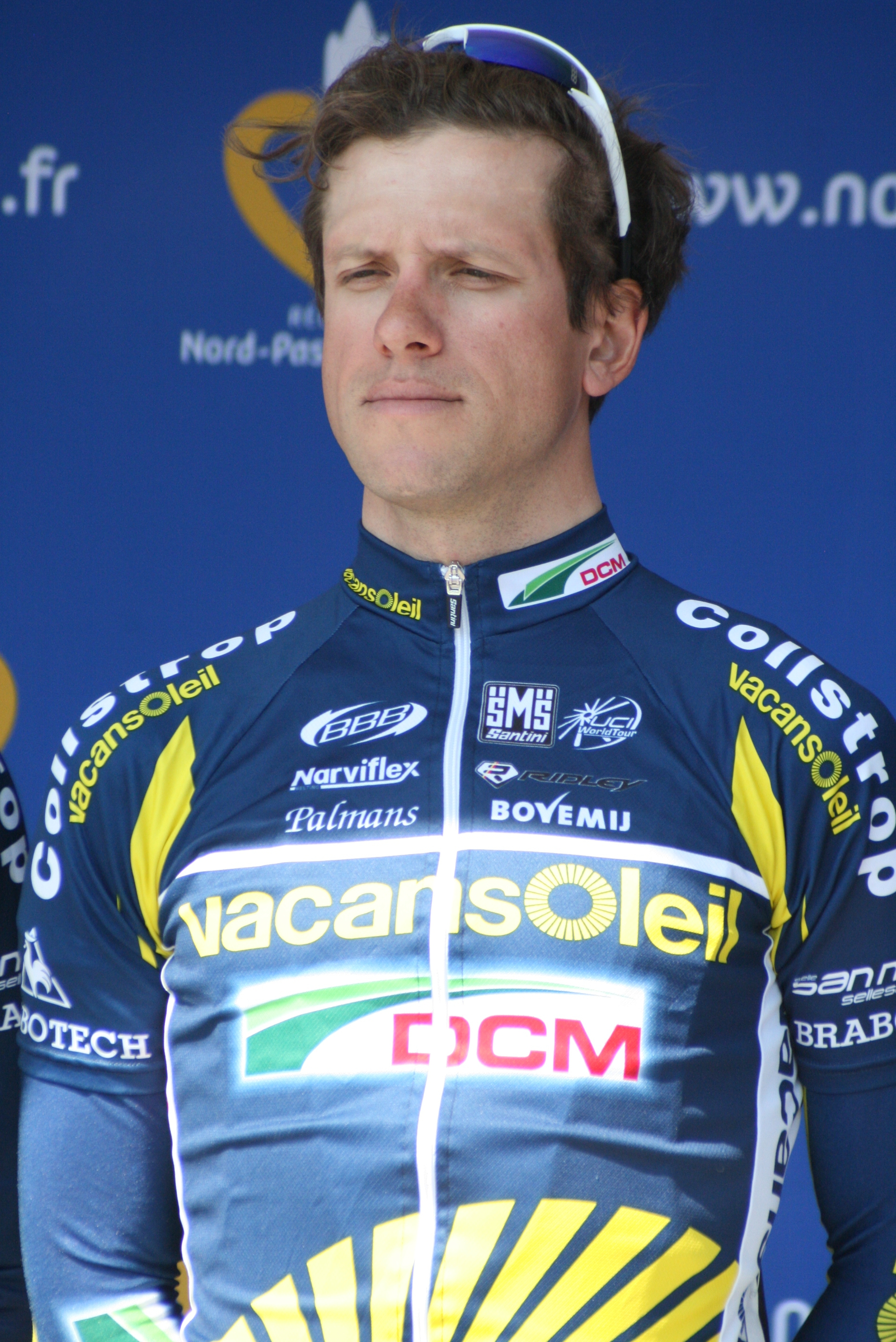

Personal information
- Full name: Ruslan Pidhornyy; Руслан Підгорний
- Born: 25 July 1977 (age 49) Vinnytsia, Ukrainian SSR, Soviet Union

Cycling career
- Sport: Cycling
- Discipline: Road
- Role: Rider

Professional teams
- 2002: De Nardi–Pasta Montegrappa
- 2004: LPR–Piacenza
- 2005–2007: Tenax–Nobili Rubinetterie
- 2008: LPR Brakes–Ballan
- 2009–2010: ISD
- 2011: Vacansoleil–DCM

Ruslan Pidhornyy (Ukrainian: Руслан Підгорний; born 25 July 1977) is a Ukrainian former professional road bicycle racer. He was born in Vinnytsia.

In 2004, Pidhornyy, along with Juriy Ivanov, was released from LPR–Piacenza due to his involvement in an investigation of assaulting and robbing a prostitute.

In 2008, he was the Ukrainian Road Race champion.

== Major results ==
1997
2nd Time trial, National Road Championships
1999
3rd Road race, National Road Championships
2000
9th Overall Giro Ciclistico d'Italia
2001
1st Overall Giro del Friuli Venezia Giulia
1st La Popolarissima
2002
2nd Road race, National Road Championships
2003
1st Overall Giro del Friuli Venezia Giulia

1st Stage 1 (TTT)

2nd Coppa Colli Briantei
3rd Circuito del Porto
3rd Gran Premio Inda
2004
1st Giro del Medio Brenta
1st Giro del Casentino
1st Gran Premio Industria del Cuoio e delle Pelli
2nd Trofeo Internazionale Bastianelli
2nd Freccia dei Vini
2nd Gara Ciclistica Montappone
3rd Cronoscalata Internazionale Gardone
4th Overall Giro del Friuli Venezia Giulia
9th GP Industria Artigianato e Commercio Carnaghese
2005
2nd GP Nobili Rubinetterie
5th GP Industria & Artigianato di Larciano
8th Overall Brixia Tour
10th Overall Bayern–Rundfahrt
2006
1st Trofeo Matteotti
2nd Overall Tour of Austria
2nd GP Città di Camaiore
3rd Overall Brixia Tour
3rd GP Nobili Rubinetterie
3rd Memorial Marco Pantani
10th GP Fred Mengoni
2007
2nd Road race, National Road Championships
3rd Giro dell'Appennino
4th Overall Brixia Tour

1st Stage 3

5th Overall Tour of Austria
6th Giro del Lazio
7th GP Industria Artigianato e Commercio Carnaghese
9th Trofeo Melinda
2008
1st Road race, National Road Championships
3rd Overall Tour of Austria

1st Stage 3

3rd Memorial Marco Pantani
6th Overall Circuit de Lorraine
8th Trofeo Matteotti
10th Overall Brixia Tour
10th Overall Tour de Slovénie
2009
2nd Overall Tour of Austria
3rd Road race, National Road Championships
2010
1st Stage 3 Tour of Austria
National Road Championships

2nd Road race
4th Time trial

8th Overall Brixia Tour

1st Stage 1 (TTT)
