= Oleksandr Sheydyk =

Ukrainian cyclist (born 1980)

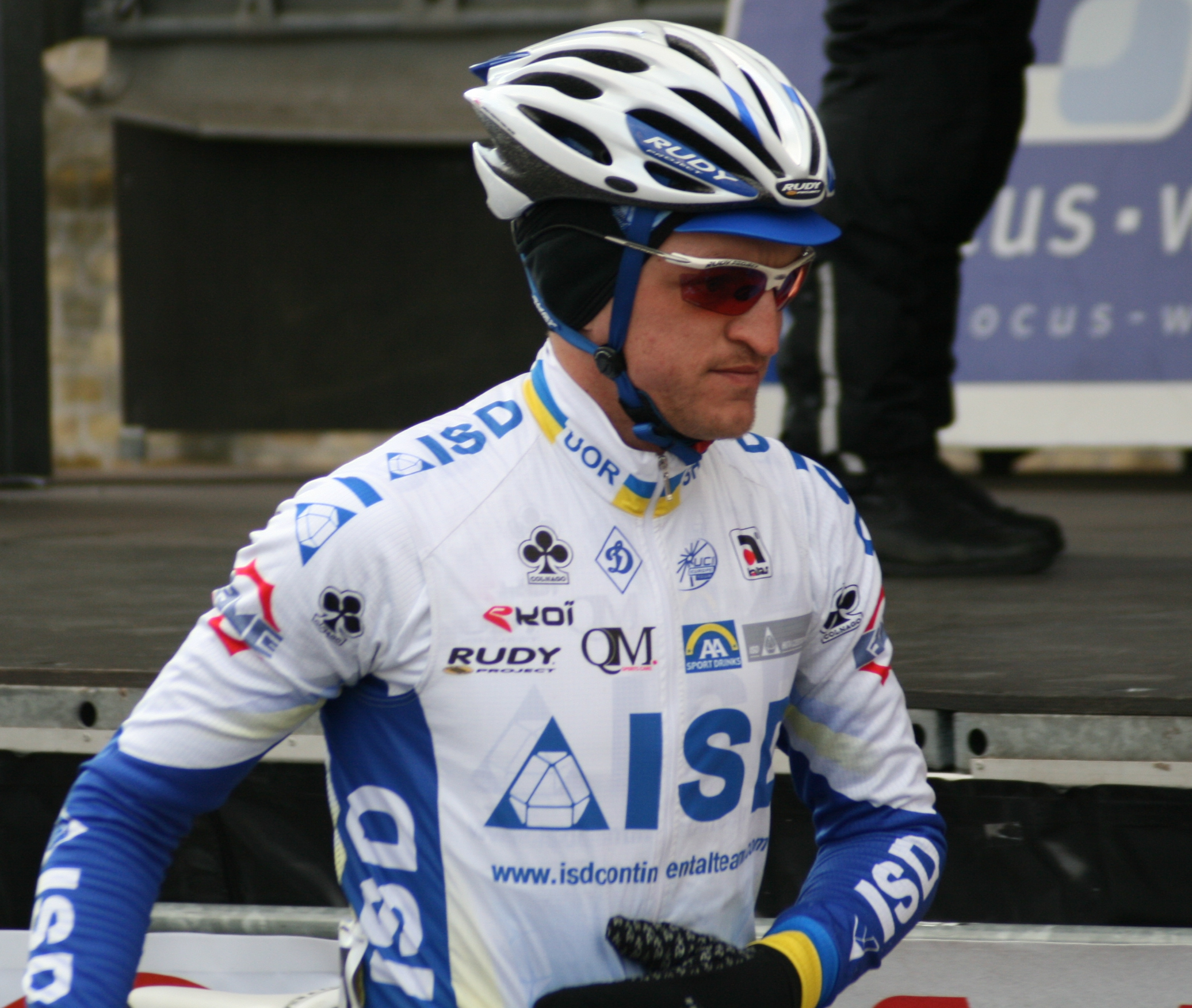
- Sheydyk in 2010.

Personal information
- Born: 13 September 1980 (age 46) Rivne, Ukraine

Cycling career
- Sport: Cycling
- Current team: Retired
- Discipline: Road
- Role: Rider

Amateur team
- 2015–2018: PC Manzanillo

Professional teams
- 2008–2011: ISD Sport Donetsk
- 2012: Lampre–ISD
- 2013–2014: ISD Continental Team

Oleksandr Volodymyrovych Sheydyk (Ukrainian: Олександр Володимирович Шейдик; born 13 September 1980) is a Ukrainian former professional cyclist.

== Palmares ==
2007
1st stage 3 Tour de Serbie
2009
2nd Grand Prix Kooperativa
3rd Coupe des Carpathes
2010
1st stages 1 and 3 Tour of Szeklerland
1st stage 3 Tour des Pyrénées
3rd Ukrainian National Road Race Championships
2011
2nd Grand Prix of Sochi
2nd Course de la Solidarité Olympique
3rd An Post Rás
3rd Sibiu Cycling Tour
2013
2nd Race Horizon Park I
