= Oleksandr Polivoda =

Ukrainian cyclist (born 1987)

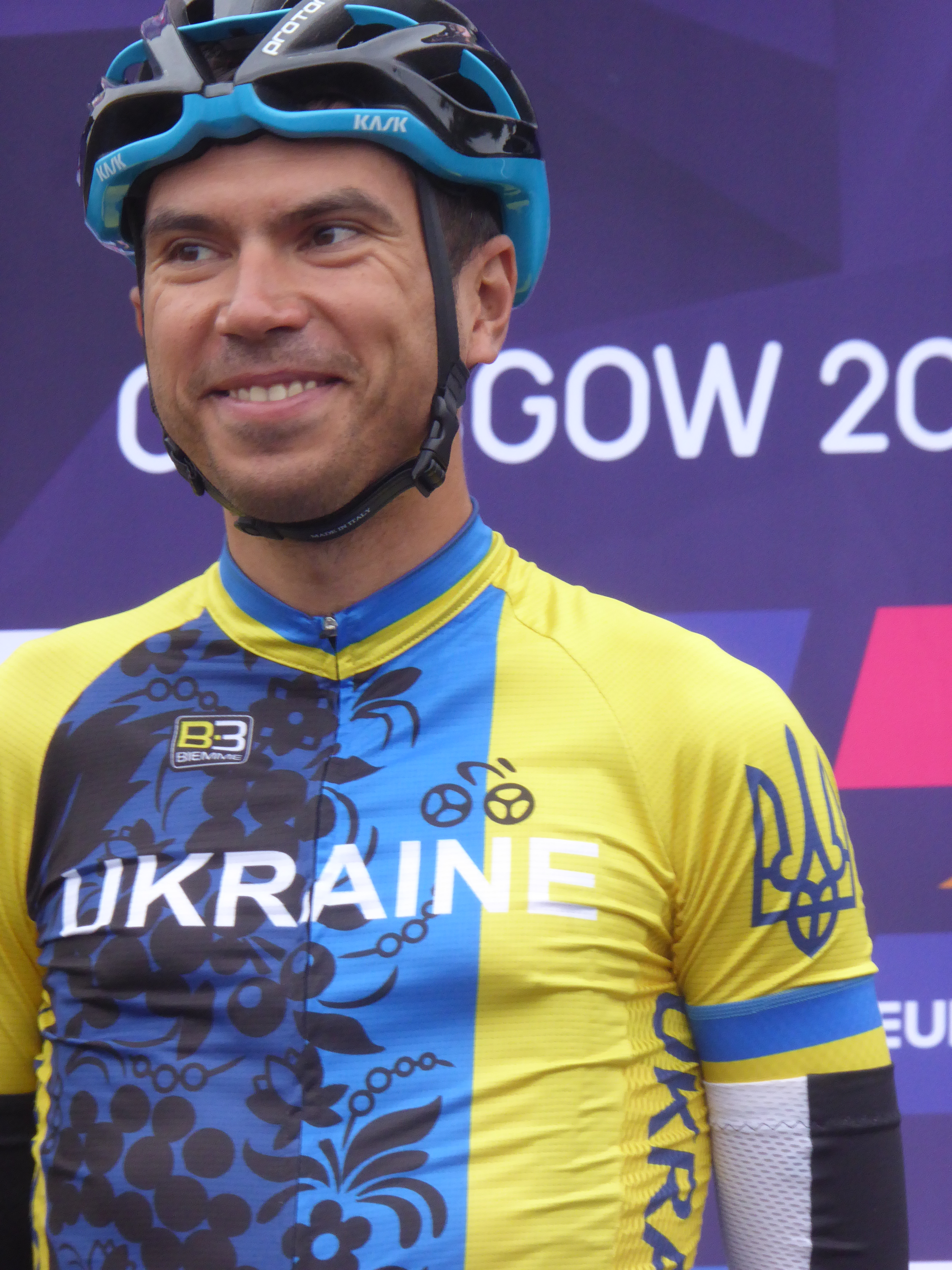
- Polivoda at the 2018 European Road Cycling Championships

Personal information
- Full name: Oleksandr Mikhailovich Polivoda; Ukrainian: Олександр Михайлович Поливода
- Born: 31 March 1987 (age 39): Kharkiv, Ukrainian SSR, Soviet Union; (now Ukraine)

Cycling career
- Sport: Cycling
- Discipline: Road
- Role: Rider

Professional teams
- 2013: Atlas Personal–Jakroo
- 2014–2017: Kolss Cycling Team
- 2018: Synergy Baku
- 2018–2019: Ningxia Sports Lottery–Livall Cycling Team
- 2020: SSOIS Miogee Cycling Team

Major wins
- One-day races and Classics National Road Race Championships (2016, 2018) National Time Trial Championships (2017)

Oleksandr Mikhailovich Polivoda (Ukrainian: Олександр Михайлович Поливода; born 31 March 1987) is a Ukrainian racing cyclist, who most recently rode for UCI Continental team SSOIS Miogee Cycling Team. He rode at the 2014 UCI Road World Championships.

== Major results ==
2007
1st Points classification, Mainfranken-Tour
2009
8th Gran Premio Inda
2011
National Road Championships

3rd Road race
4th Time trial

9th Giro del Medio Brenta
2012
2nd Coppa Collecchio
3rd Road race, National Road Championships
4th Giro del Medio Brenta
5th Trofeo Gianfranco Bianchin
8th Overall Tour of Hainan
2013
1st Stage 5 Tour of Qinghai Lake
National Road Championships

6th Road race
10th Time trial

10th Overall Paris–Arras Tour
2014
1st Overall Okolo Slovenska

1st Stage 2

1st Mountains classification, Paris–Arras Tour
3rd Overall Tour of Qinghai Lake

1st Stage 1

3rd Overall Five Rings of Moscow
3rd Memorial Oleg Dyachenko
3rd Race Horizon Park 3
4th Race Horizon Park 1
National Road Championships

7th Road race
10th Time trial

7th Overall Tour of China I
9th Tour of Almaty
2015
1st Overall Tour of Mersin

1st Stage 1

1st Overall Five Rings of Moscow

1st Stage 3

Race Horizon Park

1st Maidan
6th Classic

1st Odessa Grand Prix 1
2nd Overall Tour of China I
2nd Grand Prix of ISD
2nd Memorial Oleg Dyachenko
3rd Road race, National Road Championships
Visegrad 4 Bicycle Race

3rd GP Czech Republic
9th GP Polski

5th Overall Tour of Qinghai Lake

1st Stage 3

6th Grand Prix of Vinnytsia
8th Overall Okolo Slovenska
9th Overall Tour of China II
2016
National Road Championships

1st Road race
5th Time trial

1st Overall CCC Tour Grody Piastowskie

1st Stage 1

2nd Overall Tour de Hongrie
Visegrad 4 Bicycle Race

3rd Kerékpárverseny
10th GP Polski

6th Overall Tour of China I
6th Tour de Ribas
7th Overall Tour of China II
7th Overall Tour of Bulgaria

1st Stage 4

10th Odessa Grand Prix
2017
National Road Championships

1st Time trial
3rd Road race

Tour of Qinghai Lake

1st Stages 8 & 9

1st Stage 2 Tour of Xingtai
2nd Overall Tour d'Azerbaïdjan

1st Stage 2

3rd Odessa Grand Prix
7th Overall Tour of Ukraine

1st Stage 2 (TTT)

2018
National Road Championships

1st Road race
5th Time trial

Tour de Singkarak

1st Points classification
1st Mountains classification
1st Stage 2

3rd Overall Tour of Cartier
4th Grand Prix Alanya
5th Overall Tour of Xingtai
5th Grand Prix Side
6th Overall Tour of Qinghai Lake
Race Horizon Park

6th Race for Peace
10th Maidan

2019
National Road Championships

2nd Road race
7th Time trial

3rd Overall Tour of Quanzhou Bay
6th Overall Tour of Xingtai
6th Grand Prix Gazipaşa
7th Overall Tour of Taiyuan
9th Overall Tour of Qinghai Lake
