= Yuriy Aharkov =

Ukrainian bicycle racer (born 1987)

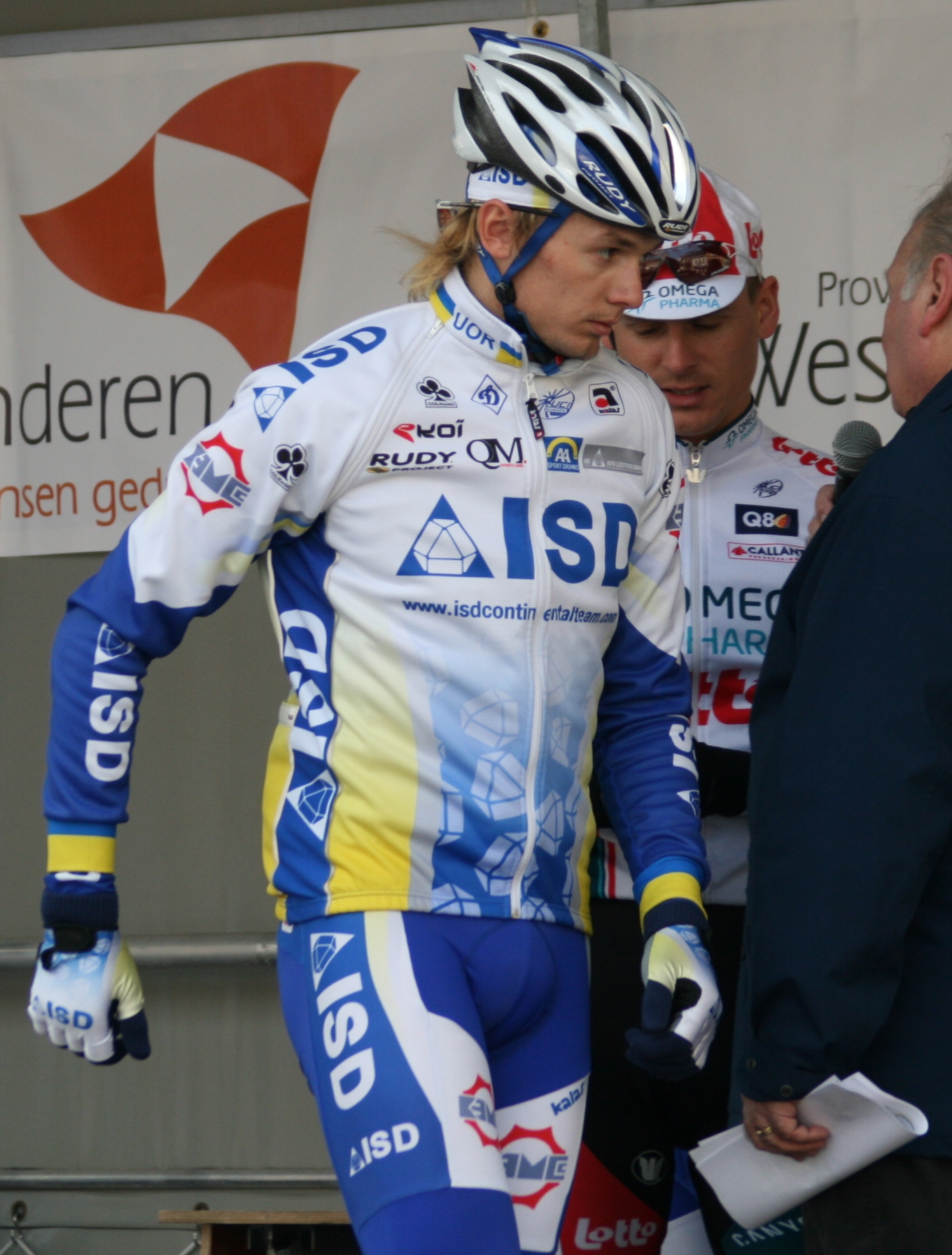

Personal information
- Full name: Yuriy Pavlovych Aharkov
- Born: 8 January 1987 (age 39) Kreminna, Soviet Union (now Ukraine)

Cycling career
- Sport: Cycling
- Current team: Retired
- Discipline: Road
- Role: Rider

Professional teams
- 2009–2014: ISD Sport Donetsk
- 2015: Team Lvshan Landscape
- 2016: Hainan Jilun Shakeland Cycling Team

Yuriy Pavlovych Aharkov (Ukrainian: Юрій Павлович Агарков; born 8 January 1987) is a Ukrainian former professional cyclist.

== Major results ==
2008
1st Time trial, National Under-23 Road Championships
5th Overall Le Triptyque des Monts et Châteaux

1st Stage 3

2009
2nd La Côte Picarde
4th Memorial Oleg Dyachenko
2010
1st Stage 4b Tour of Szeklerland
2011
1st Grand Prix of Donetsk
9th Overall Five Rings of Moscow
2012
8th Grand Prix of Donetsk
2013
3rd Mayor Cup
2014
9th Central European Tour Košice–Miskolc
10th Race Horizon Park 1
