= Kolss Cycling Team =

Ukrainian cycling team

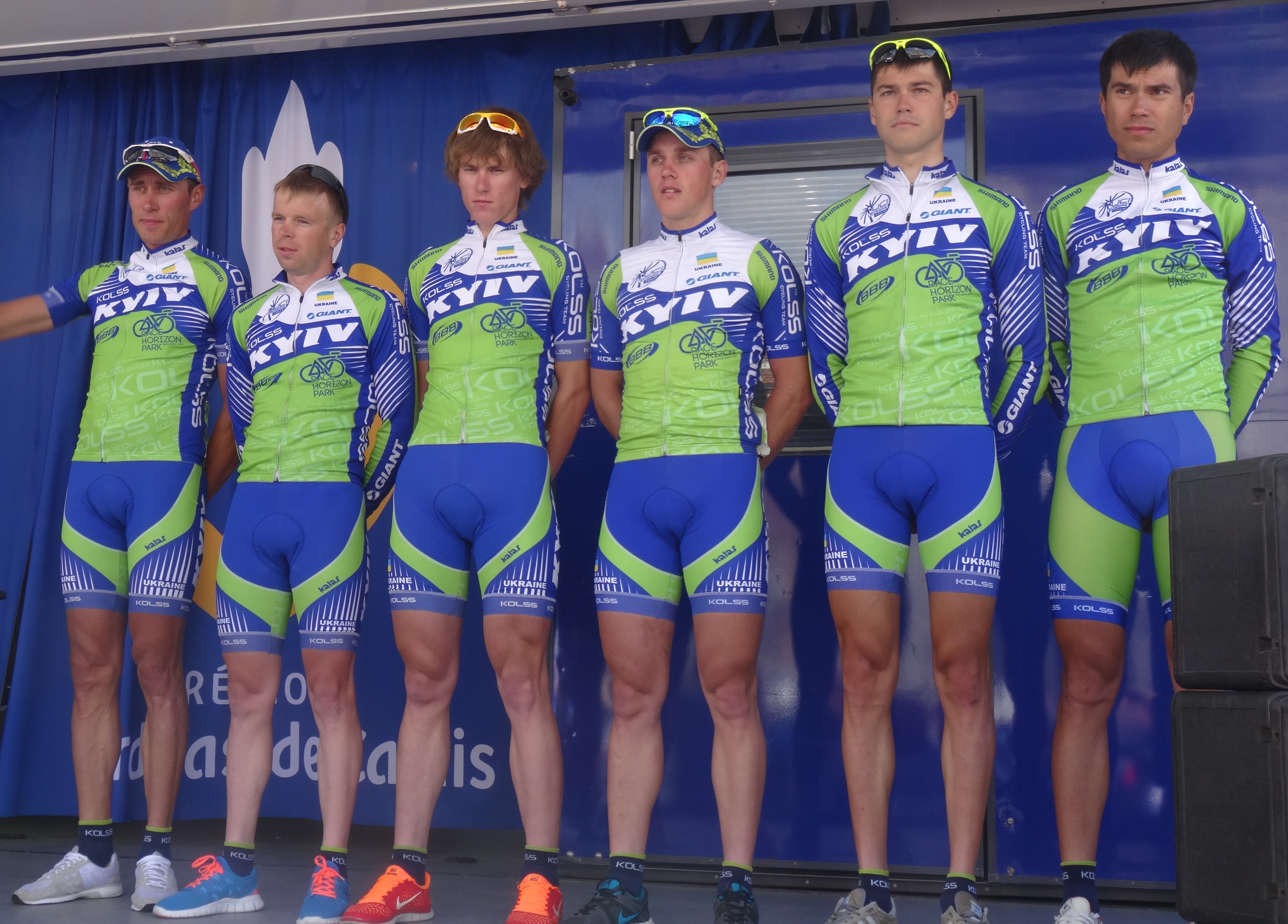

Team information
- UCI code: KLS
- Registered: Ukraine
- Founded: 2010
- Disbanded: 2017
- Discipline: Road
- Status: UCI Continental

Key personnel
- General manager: Mykola Skorenko
- Team manager: Vladimir Poulnikov

Team name history
- 2010–2014 2015–2016 2017: Kolss Cycling Team; Kolss BDC Team; Kolss Cycling Team

The Kolss Cycling Team (UCI team code: KLS) were a Ukrainian UCI Continental cycling team. It took part in the UCI Europe Tour before disbanding at the end of 2017.

== 2017 team roster ==
As at 31 December 2017

Rider	Date of birth
Norbert Banaszek (POL)	18 June 1997 (aged 20)
Adrian Banaszek (POL)	21 October 1993 (aged 24)
Pavlo Bondarenko (UKR)	10 September 1996 (aged 21)
Andrii Bratashchuk (UKR)	8 April 1992 (aged 25)
Vitaliy Buts (UKR)	24 October 1986 (aged 31)
Volodymyr Kogut (UKR)	28 July 1984 (aged 33)
Mykhaylo Kononenko (UKR)	30 October 1987 (aged 30)
Andriy Kulyk (UKR)	30 August 1989 (aged 28)

Rider	Date of birth
Sergiy Lagkuti (UKR)	24 April 1985 (aged 32)
Vasyl Malynivskyi (UKR)	21 November 1992 (aged 25)
Oleksandr Polivoda (UKR)	31 March 1987 (aged 30)
Oleksandr Prevar (UKR)	28 June 1990 (aged 27)
Llibert Sendros (ESP)	26 August 1991 (aged 26)
Mykyta Skorenko (UKR)	28 June 1993 (aged 24)
Vladyslav Soltasiuk (UKR)	23 September 1997 (aged 20)
Andriy Vasylyuk (UKR)	29 August 1987 (aged 30)

== Major wins ==
2011
Stage 5 Okolo Slovenska, Mykhaylo Kononenko
Stage 4 Tour of Szeklerland, Anatoliy Sosnitskiy

2012
Stage 4 Grand Prix of Sochi, Mykhaylo Kononenko
Stages 2, 4 & 6 Romanian Cycling Tour, Andriy Kulyk

2013
Overall Grand Prix of Sochi, Vitaliy Buts

Stage 4, Vitaliy Buts

Overall Grand Prix of Adygeya, Andriy Khripta

Stage 3, Vitaliy Buts

Mayor Cup, Vitaliy Buts
Prologue (ITT) Five Rings of Moscow, Andriy Vasylyuk
Stage 1 Five Rings of Moscow, Vitaliy Buts
Race Horizon Park 1, Denys Kostyuk
Race Horizon Park 2, Mykhaylo Kononenko
Ukraine National Under-23 Time Trial Championships, Oleksandr Golovash
Ukraine National Time Trial Championships, Andriy Vasylyuk
Ukraine National Road Race Championships, Denys Kostyuk
Overall Romanian Cycling Tour, Vitaliy Buts

Prologue, Team time trial
Stage 4, Vitaliy Buts

Stage 1 Tour of Szeklerland, Vitaliy Buts
Stage 1b Tour of Bulgaria, Vitaliy Buts

2014
Race Horizon Park 1, Vitaliy Buts
Race Horizon Park 2, Mykhaylo Kononenko
Race Horizon Park 3, Denys Kostyuk
Overall Okolo Slovenska, Oleksandr Polivoda

Stage 2, Oleksandr Polivoda
Stage 5, Andriy Kulyk

Ukraine National Time Trial Championships, Andriy Vasylyuk
Ukraine National Road Race Championships, Vitaliy Buts
Overall Tour of Qinghai Lake, Mykhaylo Kononenko

Stage 1, Oleksandr Polivoda
Stage 3, Mykhaylo Kononenko
Stage 8, Sergiy Lagkuti

Stage 1 Tour of Szeklerland, Oleksandr Golovash
Stages 1 & 3 Baltic Chain Tour, Mykhaylo Kononenko
Stage 4 Tour of China I, Vitaliy Buts

2015
Overall Tour of Mersin, Oleksandr Polivoda

Stage 1, Oleksandr Polivoda
Stage 3, Mykhaylo Kononenko
Stage 4, Vitaliy Buts

Moscow Cup, Sergiy Lagkuti
Memorial Oleg Dyachenko, Mykhaylo Kononenko
Stage 1 Szlakiem Grodów Piastowskich, Andriy Kulyk
Overall Five Rings of Moscow, Oleksandr Polivoda

Stage 2, Mykhaylo Kononenko
Stage 3, Oleksandr Polivoda

Grand Prix of Vinnytsia, Vitaliy Buts
Horizon Park Race for Peace, Sergiy Lagkuti
Horizon Park Race Maidan, Oleksandr Polivoda
Horizon Park Classic, Mykhaylo Kononenko
Memorial Grundmanna I Wizowskiego, Adam Stachowiak
Ukraine National Time Trial Championships, Sergiy Lagkuti
Ukraine National Road Race Championships, Mykhaylo Kononenko
Minsk Cup, Oleksandr Golovash
Stage 3 Tour of Qinghai Lake, Oleksandr Polivoda
Overall Podlasie Tour, Andriy Vasylyuk
Prologue (ITT) Mazovia Tour, Konrad Tomasiak
Odessa Grand Prix 1, Oleksandr Polivoda
Odessa Grand Prix 2, Vitaliy Buts
Stage 3b Tour of Szeklerland, Oleksandr Golovash
Overall Baltic Chain Tour, Andriy Kulyk

Stage 2, Andriy Kulyk

Overall Black Sea Cycling Tour, Vitaliy Buts

Stages 1 & 2, Vitaliy Buts

2016
Belgrade–Banja Luka I, Vitaliy Buts
GP Slovakia, Andriy Kulyk
Memoriał Romana Siemińskiego, Mykhaylo Kononenko
Overall Szlakiem Grodów Piastowskich, Oleksandr Polivoda

Stage 1, Oleksandr Polivoda

Horizon Park Race for Peace, Vitaliy Buts
Horizon Park Classic, Mykhaylo Kononenko
Overall Tour of Ukraine, Sergiy Lagkuti

Stage 1, Sergiy Lagkuti
Stage 2a (TTT)

Ukraine National Time Trial Championships, Andriy Vasylyuk
Ukraine National Road Race Championships, Oleksandr Polivoda

2017
Overall Tour of Ukraine, Vitaliy Buts

Stage 1, Vitaliy Buts
Stage 2 (TTT)

Horizon Park Race for Peace, Mykhaylo Kononenko
Ukraine National Time Trial Championships, Oleksandr Polivoda
Ukraine National Road Race Championships, Vitaliy Buts
Stage 7 Tour of Qinghai Lake, Mykhaylo Kononenko
Stages 8 & 9 Tour of Qinghai Lake, Oleksandr Polivoda
Prologue Dookoła Mazowsza, Adrian Banaszek
Tour de Ribas, Sergiy Lagkuti

== National champions ==
2013
Ukrainian U23 Road Race, Oleksandr Golovash
Ukrainian Road Race, Denys Kostyuk
Ukrainian Time Trial, Andriy Vasylyuk

2014
Ukrainian Time Trial, Andriy Vasylyuk
Ukrainian Road Race, Vitaliy Buts

2015
Ukrainian Road Race, Mykhaylo Kononenko
Ukrainian Time Trial, Sergiy Lagkuti

2016
Ukrainian Road Race, Oleksandr Polivoda
Ukrainian Time Trial, Andriy Vasylyuk

2017
Ukrainian Time Trial, Oleksandr Polivoda
Ukrainian U23 Road Race, Vladyslav Soltasiuk

== See also ==
- ISD–Jorbi
- Amore & Vita
