= Denys Kostyuk =

Ukrainian cyclist

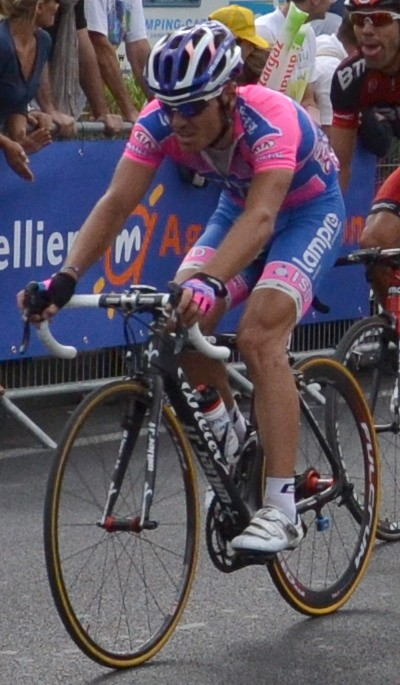
- Kostyuk at the 2011 Tour de France

Personal information
- Full name: Denys Kostyuk
- Born: 13 March 1982 (age 44) Pervomaisk, Mykolaiv Oblast, Ukrainian SSR, Soviet Union (now Ukraine)
- Height: 1.76 m (5 ft 9 in)
- Weight: 66 kg (146 lb)

Cycling career
- Sport: Cycling
- Current team: Retired
- Discipline: Road
- Role: Rider

Professional teams
- 2004: Vlaanderen–T Interim
- 2005: Jartazi Granville Team
- 2006–2007: Intel–Action
- 2008: ISD Sport Donetsk
- 2009–2010: ISD
- 2011–2012: Lampre–ISD
- 2013–2016: Kolss Cycling Team
- 2016: ISD–Jorbi

Major wins
- One-day races and Classics National Road Race Championships (2013)

Denys Valentynovych Kostyuk (Ukrainian: Денис Валентинович Костюк; born 13 March 1982) is a Ukrainian former professional road bicycle racer, who rode professionally between 2004 and 2016. During his career, Kostyuk rode for UCI ProTeam Lampre–ISD in 2011 and 2012, and competed in the 2011 Tour de France where he finished in 153rd place.

== Personal life ==
He is married to triple jumper Olha Saladukha.

== Major results ==
2002
4th Gran Premio Industrie del Marmo
2003
1st Gran Premio Palio del Recioto
2nd Overall Giro delle Regioni

1st Stages 4 & 5 (ITT)

2nd Gran Premio Industrie del Marmo
2nd Giro del Belvedere
2nd Gran Premio della Liberazione
3rd Trofeo Banca Popolare di Vicenza
3rd Trofeo Alcide Degasperi
4th Giro del Mendrisiotto
2004
3rd Road race, National Road Championships
8th Druivenkoers Overijse
2005
5th Overall Tour de l'Avenir
9th Overall Tour of Belgium
2006
1st Stage 3 Tour of Qinghai Lake
2nd Overall Five Rings of Moscow
3rd Road race, National Road Championships
7th Overall Grand Prix of Sochi
10th Overall Bałtyk–Karkonosze Tour

1st Stage 5

10th Mayor Cup
2007
7th Overall Tour of Qinghai Lake
2008
National Road Championships

2nd Road race
3rd Time trial

2nd Overall Course de Solidarność et des Champions Olympiques
3rd Overall Flèche du Sud

1st Stage 3

5th Sparkassen Giro Bochum
6th Overall Grand Prix of Sochi
6th Neuseen Classics
8th La Roue Tourangelle
2009
4th Tro-Bro Léon
9th Overall Tour of Ireland
10th Overall Volta ao Alentejo
2010
7th Grand Prix de Fourmies
2013
1st Road race, National Road Championships
1st Race Horizon Park 1
2nd Overall Five Rings of Moscow
7th Memorial Oleg Dyachenko
2014
1st Race Horizon Park 3
2nd Road race, National Road Championships
2015
2nd Road race, National Road Championships
2nd Moscow Cup
2nd Race Horizon Park Race for Peace
5th Overall Tour of Mersin
6th Grand Prix of ISD
6th Odessa Grand Prix 2
2016
3rd Road race, National Road Championships
