= Oleksandr Martynenko (cyclist) =

Ukrainian cyclist (born 1989)

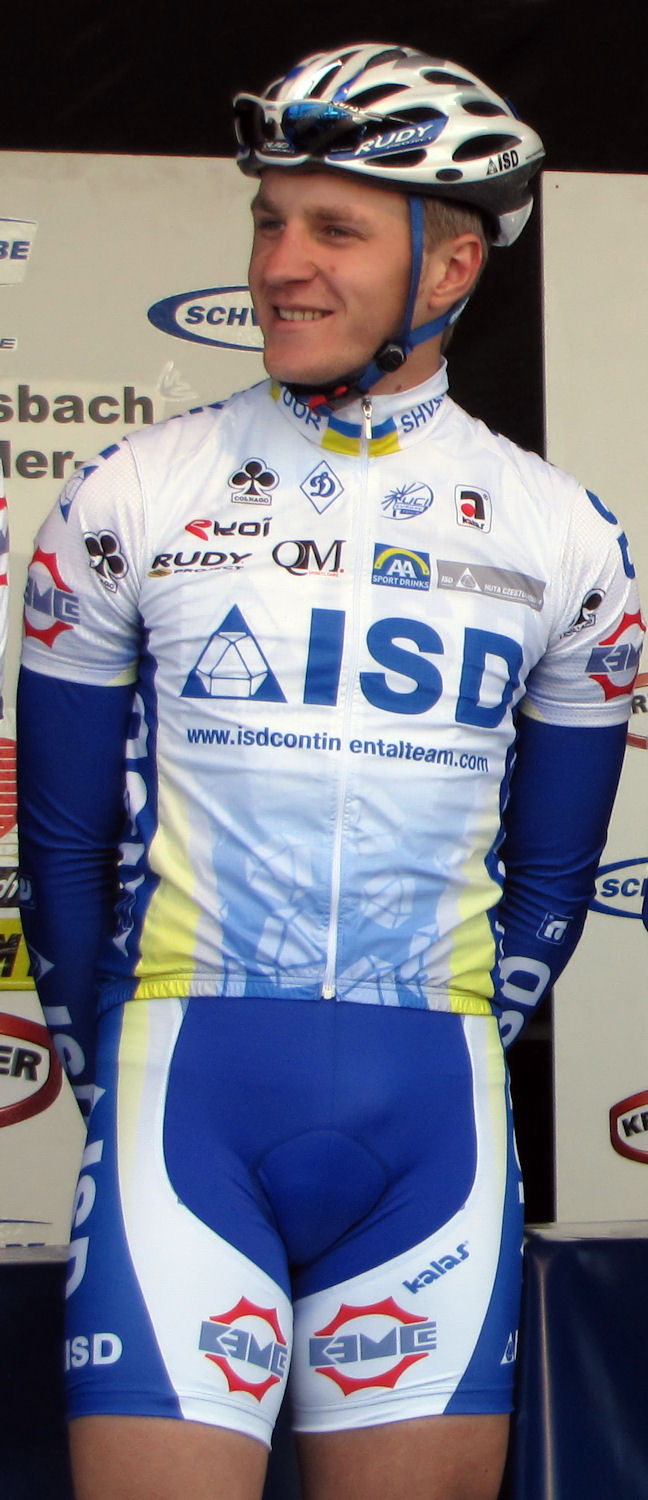

Personal information
- Born: 22 July 1989 (age 37) Donetsk, Ukraine

Cycling career
- Sport: Cycling
- Disciplines: Road, track
- Role: Rider

Professional team
- 2008–2013: ISD Sport Donetsk

Oleksandr Martynenko (born 22 July 1989 in Donetsk) is a Ukrainian cyclist.

== Palmares ==
2006
World Junior Points Race Champion
2nd European Junior Points Race Championships
2011
1st Stages 2 & 5 Grand Prix of Adygea
1st Grand Prix of Moscow
2012
2nd Race Horizon Park
2013
3rd Grand Prix of Moscow
