= Nina Ovcharenco =

Personal information
- Born: 7 August 1984 (age 42) Ukraine

Cycling career
- Sport: Cycling
- Discipline: Road cycling

Professional teams
- 2005-2006: A.S. Team FRW
- 2010-2011: S.C. Michela Fanini Rox

Nina Ovcharenco (born 7 August 1984) is a road cyclist from Ukraine. She represented her nation at the 2005 UCI Road World Championships, 2009 UCI Road World Championships and 2010 UCI Road World Championships.
