= Oksana Kashchyshyna =

Ukrainian cyclist (born 1978)

Personal information
- Full name: Oksana Mykhailivna Kashchyshyna
- Born: 15 February 1978 (age 48) Dnipropetrovsk, Ukrainian SSR, Soviet Union
- Height: 1.65 m (5 ft 5 in)
- Weight: 53 kg (117 lb)

Cycling career
- Sport: Cycling
- Current team: Retired
- Discipline: Road
- Role: Rider

Amateur team
- Ukraïna Dnipropetrovsk

Professional team
- 2011: S.C. Michela Fanini Rox

Oksana Mykhailivna Kashchyshyna (Ukrainian: Оксана Михайлівна Кащишина; born 15 February 1978 in Dnipropetrovsk) is a retired Ukrainian professional road cyclist. She represented her nation Ukraine at the 2008 Summer Olympics, and later joined with Italy's SC Michela Fanini (Record Rox) pro cycling team for the 2011 season under an annual contract.

Kashchyshyna qualified for the Ukrainian squad in the women's road race at the 2008 Summer Olympics in Beijing by receiving one of the nation's three berths from the UCI World Cup, along with her fellow riders Tetyana Styazhkina and Yevheniya Vysotska. She successfully completed a grueling race with a forty-second-place finish through a vast field of sixty-six cyclists in 3:34:13, trailing behind Germany's Judith Arndt by a 22-second gap.

== Career highlights ==
2007
2nd Ukrainian Championships (Road)
2008
2nd Ukrainian Championships (Road)
42nd Olympic Games, Beijing (CHN)
2009
2nd Stage 1, Tour de Bretagne Féminin, France
