= Valentyna Karpenko =

Ukrainian cyclist

Personal information
- Born: 9 December 1972 (age 53) Ukrainian SSR, Soviet Union

Cycling career
- Sport: Cycling
- Discipline: Road cycling

Professional teams
- 1999: Primavera Oliveiro
- 2001: Ciegi
- 2002: Pragma-Deia-Colnago
- 2003: Velodames-Colnago

Valentyna Karpenko (born 9 December 1972) is a road cyclist from Ukraine. She represented her nation at the 2000 Summer Olympics and 2004 Summer Olympics She also rode at the 1995, 1999 and 2004 UCI Road World Championships.
