= Alexey Shmidt =

Russian cyclist

Personal information
- Born: 17 April 1983 (age 43) Khimki, Russia

Cycling career
- Sport: Cycling
- Current team: Retired
- Disciplines: Road; Track
- Role: Rider

Professional teams
- 2005–2006: Omnibike Dynamo Moscow
- 2007: Moscow Stars
- 2008: Katyusha
- 2009: Moscow
- 2010–2012: Team Type 1
Medal record
Men's track cycling
Representing Russia
European Championships
Gold medal – first place	2005 Dalmine	Derny
Bronze medal – third place	2005 Dalmine	Madison
World Junior Championships
Bronze medal – third place	2001 Trexlertown	Team pursuit
European U23 Championships
Silver medal – second place	2001 Brno	Madison
Silver medal – second place	2002 Büttgen	Scratch
Silver medal – second place	2003 Moscow	Madison
Silver medal – second place	2003 Moscow	Team pursuit
Bronze medal – third place	2004 Valencia	Team pursuit
European Junior Championships
Gold medal – first place	2001 Fiorenzuola	Points race
Silver medal – second place	2001 Fiorenzuola	Team pursuit

Alexey Shmidt (born 17 April 1983) is a Russian former professional road and track cyclist. He competed in the madison event at the 2004 Summer Olympics. He also competed in the madison event at the 2010 UCI Track Cycling World Championships.

He tested positive for EPO in September 2015 from a retested sample taken in November 2011.

== Major results ==
=== Track ===
2001
European Junior Championships

1st Points race
2nd Team pursuit

2nd Madison, European Under-23 Championships
3rd Team pursuit, UCI Junior World Championships
2002
2nd Scratch, European Under-23 Championships
2003
European Under-23 Championships

2nd Madison
2nd Team pursuit

2004
3rd Team pursuit, European Under-23 Championships
3rd Team pursuit, Moscow, UCI World Cup Classics
2005
European Championships

1st Derny
3rd Madison

2006
UCI World Cup Classics

2nd Madison, Moscow
3rd Madison, Los Angeles
3rd Team pursuit, Los Angeles

2009
3rd Madison, Manchester, UCI World Cup Classics

=== Road ===
2005
1st Grand Prix of Moscow
1st Stage 1b Five Rings of Moscow
3rd Overall Grand Prix of Sochi

1st Stages 2 & 3

2006
1st Stage 3 Tour of Hainan
5th Overall Tour of South China Sea
5th Boucle de l'Artois
10th Paris–Troyes
2007
1st Overall Grand Prix of Sochi

1st Stage 2

1st Stage 1a Tour de Serbie
10th Overall Five Rings of Moscow

1st Stage 1a (ITT)

2009
5th Overall Five Rings of Moscow
5th Memorial Oleg Dyachenko
2010
1st Tour de Ribas
2011
5th Univest Grand Prix
2012
2nd Overall Tour of America's Dairyland

1st Stage 8

2nd Clarendon Cup
