= Moscow (cycling team) =

Team information
- UCI code: MOW
- Registered: Russia
- Founded: 2009
- Disbanded: 2010
- Discipline: Road
- Status: UCI Continental
- Bicycles: Colnago

Key personnel
- General manager: Renat Khamidouline

Team name history
- 2009–2010: Moscow

Moscow was a Russian UCI Continental cycling team.

== Major wins ==
2009
Grand Prix of Moscow, Alexander Khatuntsev
Overall Bałtyk–Karkonosze Tour, Sergey Kolesnikov
