= Grand Prix of Donetsk =

Race details
- Date: April
- Region: Donetsk Oblast
- Discipline: Road
- Competition: UCI Europe Tour
- Type: One-day race
- Web site: www.grandprix.dn.ua

History
- First edition: 2008
- Editions: 6
- Final edition: 2013
- First winner: Denys Kostyuk (UKR)
- Most wins: No repeat winners
- Final winner: Anatoliy Pakhtusov (UKR)

The Grand Prix of Donetsk was a one-day road cycling race held annually in Ukraine. It was part of UCI Europe Tour in category 1.2.

== Winners ==
Year	Country	Rider	Team
2008	Ukraine	Denys Kostyuk	ISD Sport Donetsk
2009	Estonia	Mart Ojavee	Cycling Club Bourgas
2010	Ukraine	Vitaliy Popkov	ISD Continental Team
2011	Ukraine	Yuriy Agarkov	ISD–Lampre Continental
2012	Russia	Ilnur Zakarin	Itera–Katusha
2013	Ukraine	Anatoliy Pakhtusov	ISD Continental Team
