= Tour of Ukraine =

Road cycling race

Race details
- Date: May–June
- Region: Ukraine
- Discipline: Road
- Competition: UCI Europe Tour
- Type: Stage race
- Web site: tourofukraine.org

History
- First edition: 2016
- Editions: 2 (as of 2017)
- First winner: Sergiy Lagkuti (UKR)
- Most wins: No repeat winners
- Most recent: Vitaliy Buts (UKR)

The Tour of Ukraine is a stage road cycling race held annually since 2016. It is part of UCI Europe Tour in category 2.2.

== Winners ==
Year	Country	Rider	Team
2016	Ukraine	Sergiy Lagkuti	Kolss BDC Team
2017	Ukraine	Vitaliy Buts	Kolss Cycling Team
