= ISD–Jorbi =

ISD–Jorbi Continental Team
Team information
- UCI code: ISD
- Registered: Ukraine
- Founded: 2006
- Disbanded: 2017
- Discipline: Road
- Status: UCI Continental
- Bicycles: Jorbi

Key personnel
- Team manager: Mykola Myrza

Team name history
- 2006–2009 2010 2011–2013 2013–2015 2016–2017: ISD Sport Donetsk; ISD Continental Team; ISD-Lampre Continental; ISD Continental Team; ISD–Jorbi Continental Team

The ISD–Jorbi Continental Team (UCI team code: ISD) were a Ukrainian UCI Continental cycling team. The team rode in senior professional events in Europe, other than the Grand Tours and UCI World Tour races.

The team disbanded at the end of the 2017 season.

== Doping ==
In August 2015, Ukrainian Anatoliy Budyak tested positive for Mesocarb.

== 2017 team roster ==
Rider	Date of birth
Yegor Dementyev (UKR)	12 March 1987 (aged 30)
Volodymyr Dzhus (UKR)	23 June 1993 (aged 24)
Ilya Klepikov (UKR)	2 February 1994 (aged 23)
Vladyslav Kreminskyi (UKR)	2 March 1995 (aged 22)

Rider	Date of birth
Oleksii Shcherbakov (UKR)	14 February 1997 (aged 20)
Iurii Shumilov (UKR)	26 September 1995 (aged 22)
Rinat Udod (UKR)	8 February 1996 (aged 21)
Rotyslav Zhukovskyi (UKR)	25 June 1990 (aged 27)

== Major wins ==
2008
La Roue Tourangelle, Vitaliy Kondrut
Stage 4 Le Triptyque des Monts et Châteaux, Yuriy Aharkov
Stage 2 Flèche du Sud, Denys Kostyuk
2009
Overall Tour of Szeklerland, Vitaliy Popkov

Stage 1, Vitaliy Popkov

2010
Ukraine Road Race Championships, Vitaliy Popkov
Ukraine Time Trial Championships, Vitaliy Popkov
Omloop van het Waasland, Denis Flahaut
Grand Prix de Denain, Denis Flahaut
GP Donetsk, Vitaliy Popkov
Overall GP Adygeya, Vitaliy Popkov

Prologue & Stage 3, Vitaliy Popkov
Stage 1, Oleksandr Sheydyk

Stage 3 Five Rings of Moscow, Vitaliy Popkov
Tallinn-Tartu GP, Denis Flahaut
Rogaland GP, Vitaliy Popkov
Stage 1 Tour of Szeklerland, Vitaliy Popkov
Stages 3 & 4a Tour of Szeklerland, Oleksandr Sheydyk
Stage 4b Tour of Szeklerland, Yuriy Aharkov
Stage 3 Tour des Pyrénées, Oleksandr Sheydyk
2011
GP Donetsk, Yuriy Aharkov
Stages 2 & 5 GP of Adygeya, Oleksandr Martynenko
GP of Moscow, Oleksandr Martynenko
Stage 2 Sibiu Cycling Tour, Maksym Vasylyev
2012
Stage 1 GP of Sochi, Anatoliy Pakhtusov
Grand Prix of Moscow, Vitaliy Popkov
Race Horizon Park, Vitaliy Popkov
Stage 3 Tour of Romania, Maksym Vasylyev
Stage 6 Course de la Solidarité Olympique, Vitaliy Popkov
Stage 4 (ITT) Dookoła Mazowsza, Vitaliy Popkov
Overall Tour of Szeklerland, Vitaliy Popkov

Stage 2, Anatoliy Pakhtusov

2013
Stage 1 Grand Prix of Sochi, Vitaliy Popkov
Grand Prix of Donetsk, Anatoliy Pakhtusov
Stage 2 Grand Prix of Adygeya, Vitaliy Popkov
Stage 3 Azerbaijan International Cycling Tour, Vitaliy Popkov
Overall Course de la Solidarité Olympique, Vitaliy Popkov

Stage 1, Vitaliy Popkov

Stage 3 (ITT) Tour of Szeklerland, Vitaliy Popkov
2014
Stage 6 Grand Prix of Sochi, Maksym Vasylyev
2017
Minsk Cup, Yehor Dementyev
