= Grand Prix of Moscow =

Russian one-day road cycling race

Race details
- Date: Early May
- Region: Moscow, Russia
- Discipline: Road race
- Competition: UCI Europe Tour
- Type: One-day race

History
- First edition: 2004
- Editions: 12
- Final edition: 2015
- First winner: Roman Paramonov (RUS)
- Most wins: Alexander Khatuntsev (RUS) (2 wins)
- Final winner: Siarhei Papok (BLR)

The Grand Prix of Moscow was a one-day road cycling race held annually in Moscow, Russia between 2004 and 2015. From 2005 to 2015, it was held as part of the UCI Europe Tour as a 1.2 category race. The most successful rider was Alexander Khatuntsev, who has two victories.

== Past winners ==
Year	Country	Rider	Team
2004	Russia	Roman Paramonov	
2005	Russia	Alexey Shmidt	Omnibike Dynamo Moscow
2006	Russia	Alexander Khatuntsev	Omnibike Dynamo Moscow
2007	Russia	Roman Klimov	Premier
2008	Latvia	Oļegs Meļehs	Dynatek–Latvia
2009	Russia	Alexander Khatuntsev	Moscow
2010	Serbia	Esad Hasanović	Partizan Srbija
2011	Ukraine	Oleksandr Martynenko	ISD–Lampre Continental
2012	Ukraine	Vitaly Popkov	ISD–Lampre Continental
2013	Russia	Ivan Kovalev	RusVelo
2014	Russia	Leonid Krasnov	RusVelo
2015	Belarus	Siarhei Papok	Minsk
