= Odesa Grand Prix =

Road cycling race in Ukraine

Odessa Grand Prix
Race details
- Date: August
- Region: Odesa Oblast
- Discipline: Road
- Competition: UCI Europe Tour
- Type: One-day race

History
- First edition: 2015
- Editions: 5 (as of 2019)
- First winner: Oleksandr Polivoda (UKR)
- Most wins: No repeat winners
- Most recent: Matvey Nikitin (KAZ)

The Odesa Grand Prix is a road cycling race held annually since 2015. In 2015 the race consisted of two one day races, but in 2016 it was a single race. It is part of UCI Europe Tour in category 1.2.

== Winners ==
=== Odessa Grand Prix ===
Year	Country	Rider	Team
2015 (1)	Ukraine	Oleksandr Polivoda	Kolss BDC Team
2015 (2)	Ukraine	Vitaliy Buts	Kolss BDC Team
2016	Ukraine	Oleksandr Prevar	Kolss BDC Team
2017	Ukraine	Mykhaylo Kononenko	Kolss Cycling Team
2019	Kazakhstan	Matvey Nikitin	Vino–Astana Motors
