= Wesley Sulzberger =

Australian cyclist

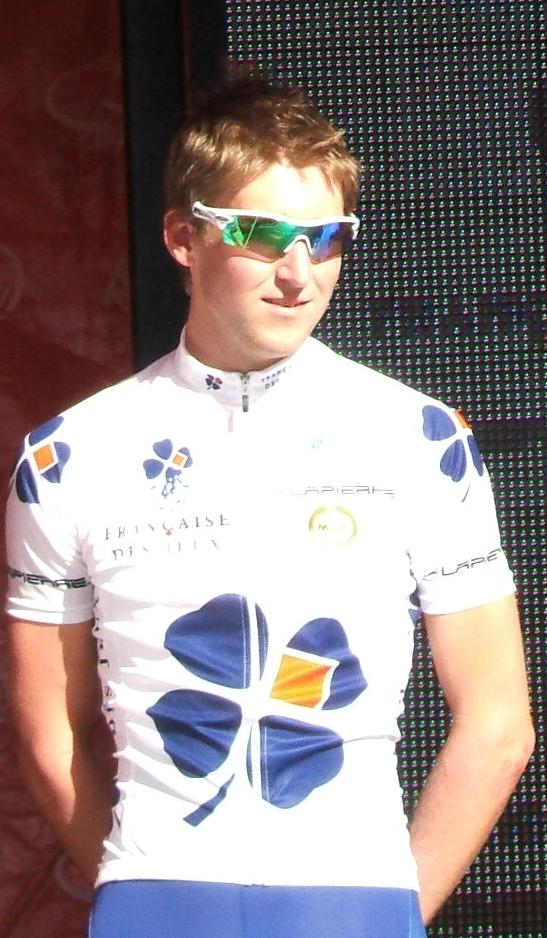
- Sulzberger at the 2009 Tour Down Under.

Personal information
- Full name: Wesley Sulzberger
- Nickname: Wes
- Born: 20 October 1986 (age 39) Launceston, Tasmania, Australia
- Height: 1.79 m (5 ft 10 in)
- Weight: 67 kg (148 lb)

Cycling career
- Sport: Cycling
- Discipline: Road
- Role: Rider

Amateur team
- 2006–2008: Southaustralia.com–AIS

Professional teams
- 2009–2011: Française des Jeux
- 2012–2013: GreenEDGE
- 2014: Drapac Professional Cycling
- 2015: Navitas Satalyst Racing team
- 2016: Kinan Cycling Team

Major wins
- National Under-23 Road Race Championships (2007)
Medal record
Representing Australia
Men's road bicycle racing
World Championships
Silver medal – second place	2007 Stuttgart	Under-23 Men's Road Race

Wesley Sulzberger (born 20 October 1986) is an Australian former professional cyclist, who rode professionally from 2009 to 2016.

== Career ==
Born in Beaconsfield, Tasmania, Sulzberger started cycling with the West Tamar Cycling Club. He began his professional career with the Australian Continental Team Southaustralia.com–AIS and later joined Française des Jeux. After three years with the team, Sulzberger moved to the GreenEDGE team for the 2012 season.[1] He remained with the team until the end of the 2013 season, before joining Drapac Professional Cycling for the 2014 season, where he rode alongside his brother, Bernard Sulzberger. During his professional cycling career, Sulzberger lived in several European cycling hubs including Varese, Italy; Beausoleil, France; Monaco; and Andorra, which served as training bases for many professional riders competing on the international circuit. Since 2017, Sulzberger has worked as Senior Country Manager for Australia and New Zealand at Zwift, a global fitness technology company. In 2022, he began studying part-time for a Master of Business Administration (MBA) at the University of Queensland, graduating at the end of 2023. In 2023, Sulzberger joined Healthy Workplaces as a Non-Executive Board Member, supporting the organisation's mission to help executives become more active through initiatives such as Step Forward and Tour de Office. Wes is passionate about supporting high-performing executives to optimise their health, fitness, and long-term performance.

== Major results ==
2005
2nd Australian National Road Race Championships, Men's & Under-23
2006
1st Overall Tour of Gippsland

1st Stage 7

Tour of Tasmania

1st Stages 6, 10 & 11

1st Stage 1 Tour de Hokkaido
2007
1st Road race, National Under-23 Road Championships
1st Stage 2 Herald Sun Tour
2nd Road race, UCI Under-23 Road World Championships
2008
1st Stage 2 Tour of Japan
1st Stage 2 Tour of Japan
1st GP di Poggiana (NAT) ITALY
1st Stage 3 - San Giovanni Teatino › Chieti ITALY
2nd Grand Prix d'Isbergues - Pas de Calais (1.1) FRANCE (Stagiaire FDJ)
4th Stage 3 Circuito Montañes (2.2) SPAIN
10th General classification Tour of Japan
10th General classification Giro delle Regioni (2.Ncup) ITALY
2009
1st Stage 2 Paris–Corrèze
5th Overall Tour Down Under
2010
1st Grand Prix de Plumelec-Morbihan
2011
8th Overall Tour of Turkey
8th Overall Bayern Rundfahrt
2013
4th Prueba Villafranca de Ordizia
2014
10th Overall Tour de Taiwan
2016
1st Stage 3 Le Tour de Filipinas
1st Points classification Le Tour de Filipinas
1st Mountains classification Tour de Kumano

=== Grand Tour general classification results timeline ===
Grand Tour	2009	2010	2011	2012	2013
Giro d'Italia	—	—	—	—	—
Tour de France	—	151	—	—	—
Vuelta a España	117	—	—	145	DNF

Legend
—	Did not compete
DNF	Did not finish
