= 2015 Tour de France =

2015 UCI World Tour, race 18 of 28
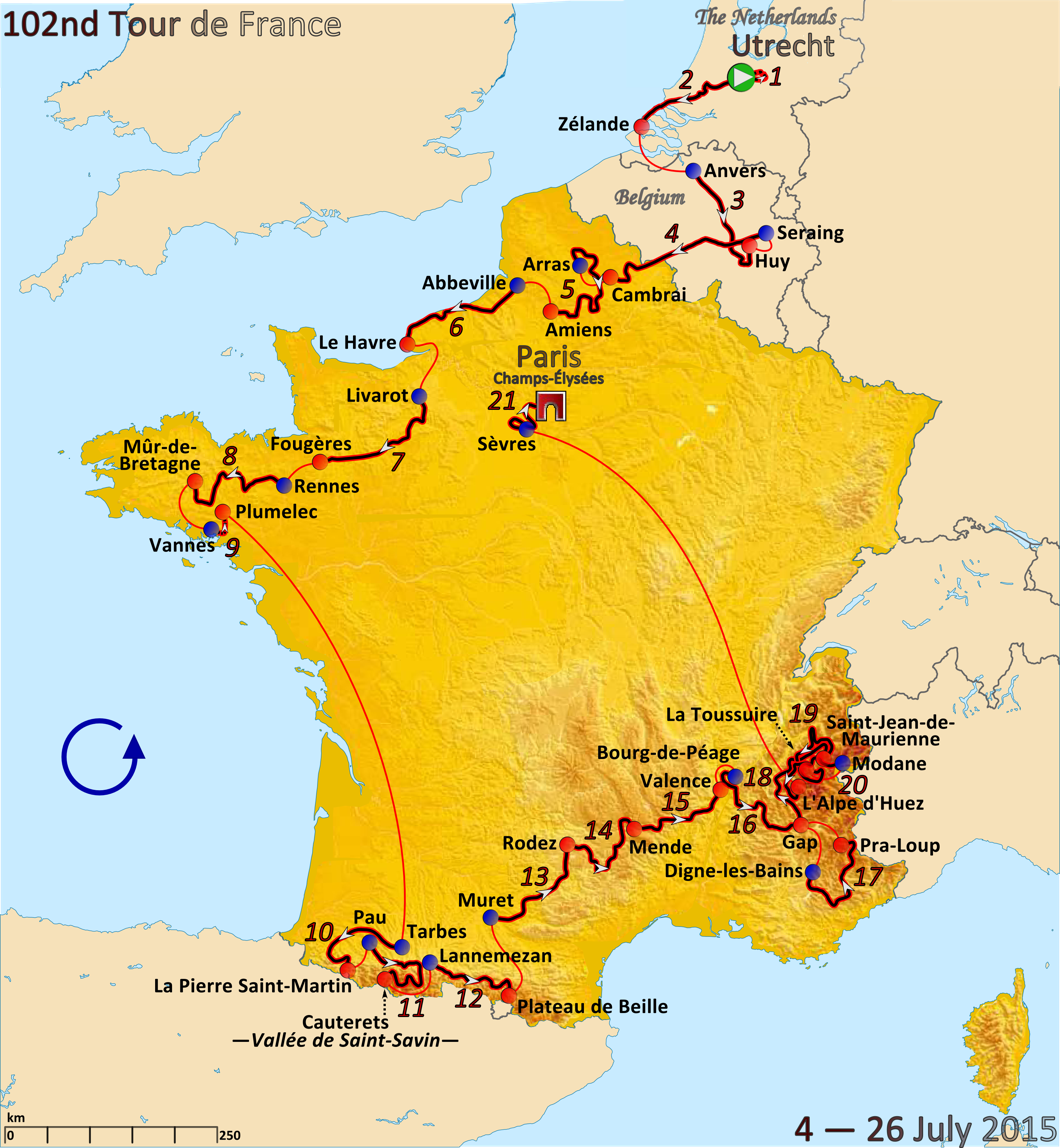
- Route of the 2015 Tour de France

Race details
- Dates: 4–26 July 2015
- Stages: 21
- Distance: 3,360.3 km (2,088.0 mi)
- Winning time: 84h 46' 14"

Results
Jersey awarded to the overall winner	Winner	Chris Froome (GBR)	(Team Sky)
	Second	Nairo Quintana (COL)	(Movistar Team)
	Third	Alejandro Valverde (ESP)	(Movistar Team)
Jersey awarded to the points classification winner	Points	Peter Sagan (SVK)	(Tinkoff–Saxo)
Jersey awarded to the mountains classification winner	Mountains	Chris Froome (GBR)	(Team Sky)
Jersey awarded to the young rider classification winner	Young rider	Nairo Quintana (COL)	(Movistar Team)
Jersey awarded to the combativity classification winner	Combativity	Romain Bardet (FRA)	(AG2R La Mondiale)
Jersey awarded to the team classification winner	Team	(Spain) Movistar Team	

The 2015 Tour de France was the 102nd edition of the Tour de France, one of cycling's Grand Tours. The 3,360.3 km (2,088 mi)-long race consisted of 21 stages, starting on 4 July in Utrecht, the Netherlands, and concluding on 26 July with the Champs-Élysées stage in Paris. A total of 198 riders from 22 teams entered the race. The overall general classification was won by Chris Froome of Team Sky, with the second and third places taken by Movistar Team riders Nairo Quintana and Alejandro Valverde, respectively.

BMC Racing Team's Rohan Dennis won the first stage to take the general classification leader's yellow jersey. Trek Factory Racing rider Fabian Cancellara claimed it on the second, only to lose it after crashing out on the following stage. This put Froome in the lead, after the Tour's first uphill finish. He lost the position to Etixx–Quick-Step's Tony Martin at the end of the fourth stage, but Martin's withdrawal from the race after a crash at the end of the sixth stage put Froome back into the lead. He extended this lead during the stages in the Pyrenees and defended it successfully against attacks from Quintana during the final stages that took place in the Alps.

Froome became the first British rider to win the Tour twice, after his 2013 victory. Peter Sagan of Tinkoff–Saxo won the points classification. Froome also won the mountains classification. The best young rider was Quintana, with his team, Movistar, the winners of the team classification. Romain Bardet of AG2R La Mondiale was given the award for the most combative rider. André Greipel (Lotto–Soudal) won the most stages, with four.

== Teams ==
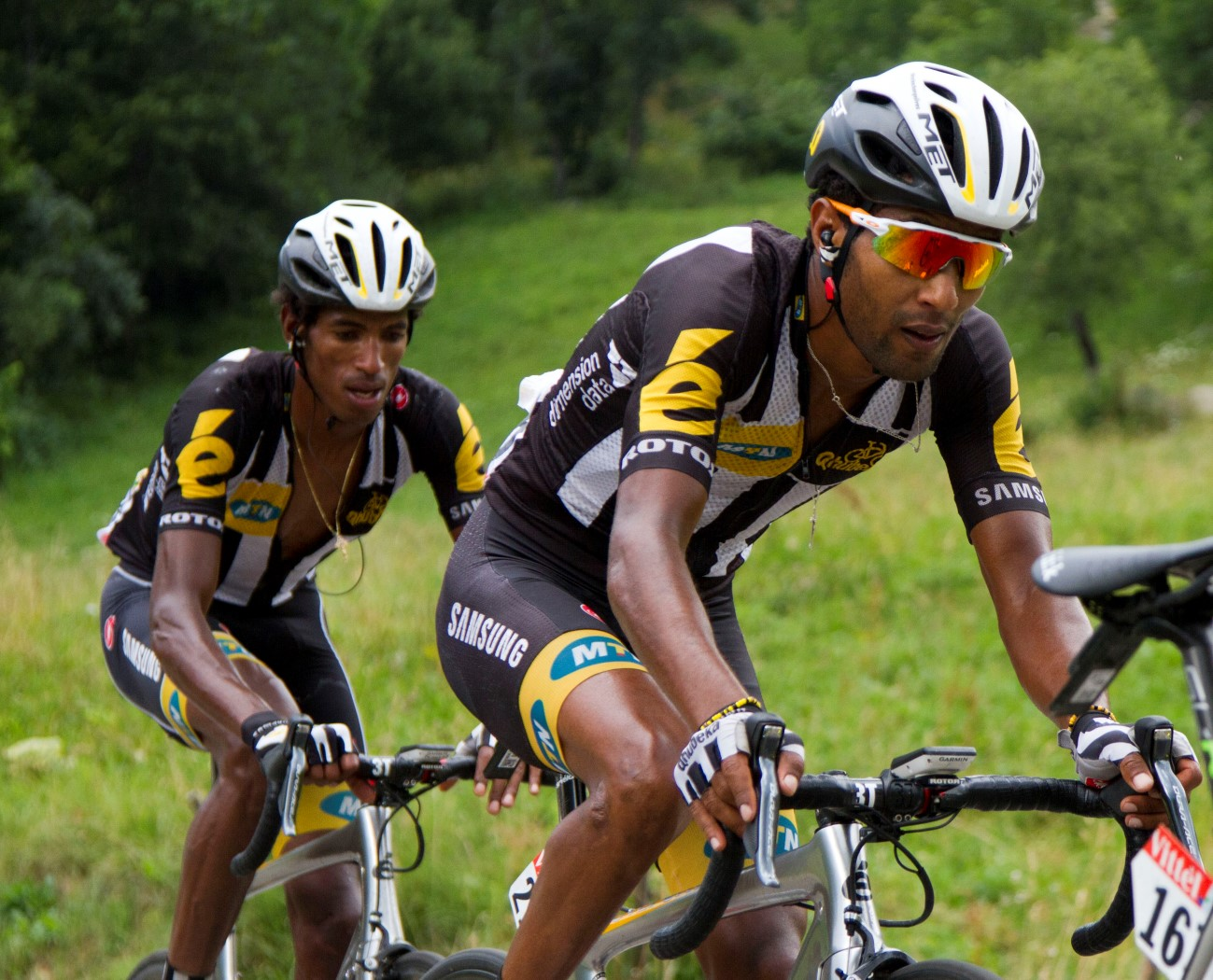
MTN–Qhubeka's Eritrean riders Daniel Teklehaimanot and Merhawi Kudus, seen here on stage nineteen, became the first black Africans to compete in the Tour de France.

Twenty-two teams participated in the 2015 edition of the Tour de France. The race was the 18th of the 28 events in the UCI World Tour, and all of its seventeen UCI WorldTeams were automatically invited, and obliged, to attend the race. On 14 January 2015, the organiser of the Tour, Amaury Sport Organisation (ASO), announced the five second-tier UCI Professional Continental teams given wildcard invitations, one of which, MTN–Qhubeka, was to become the first African-registered trade team to participate in the race's history. (Note: An Algerian-Moroccan squad participated in the 1950 Tour de France when only national and regional teams were allowed to enter.) The team presentation – where the members of each team's roster are introduced in front of the media and local dignitaries – took place at Lepelenburg Park in Utrecht, the Netherlands, on 2 July, two days before the opening stage held in the city. Each team arrived in small boats along the Oudegracht canal.

Each squad was allowed a maximum of nine riders, therefore the start list contained a total of 198 riders. Of these, 45 were riding the Tour de France for the first time. The riders came from 32 countries; France, the Netherlands, Italy, Spain, Belgium, Australia, Germany, Great Britain and Switzerland all had 10 or more riders in the race. Eritrean riders Daniel Teklehaimanot and Merhawi Kudus, both of MTN–Qhubeka, became the first black Africans to compete in the Tour de France. Riders from nine countries won stages during the race; German riders won the largest number of stages, with six. The average age of riders in the race was 29.67 years, ranging from the 21-year-old Kudus to 41-year-old Matteo Tosatto (Tinkoff–Saxo). Of the total average ages, Cofidis was the youngest team and Trek Factory Racing the oldest.

The teams entering the race were:

UCI WorldTeams

- Astana
- AG2R La Mondiale
- BMC Racing Team
- Cannondale–Garmin
- Etixx–Quick-Step
- FDJ
- Team Giant–Alpecin
- IAM Cycling
- Team Katusha
- Lampre–Merida
- Lotto–Soudal
- LottoNL–Jumbo
- Movistar Team
- Orica–GreenEDGE
- Team Sky
- Tinkoff–Saxo
- Trek Factory Racing

UCI Professional Continental teams

- Bora–Argon 18
- Bretagne–Séché Environnement
- Cofidis
- Team Europcar
- MTN–Qhubeka

== Pre-race favourites ==
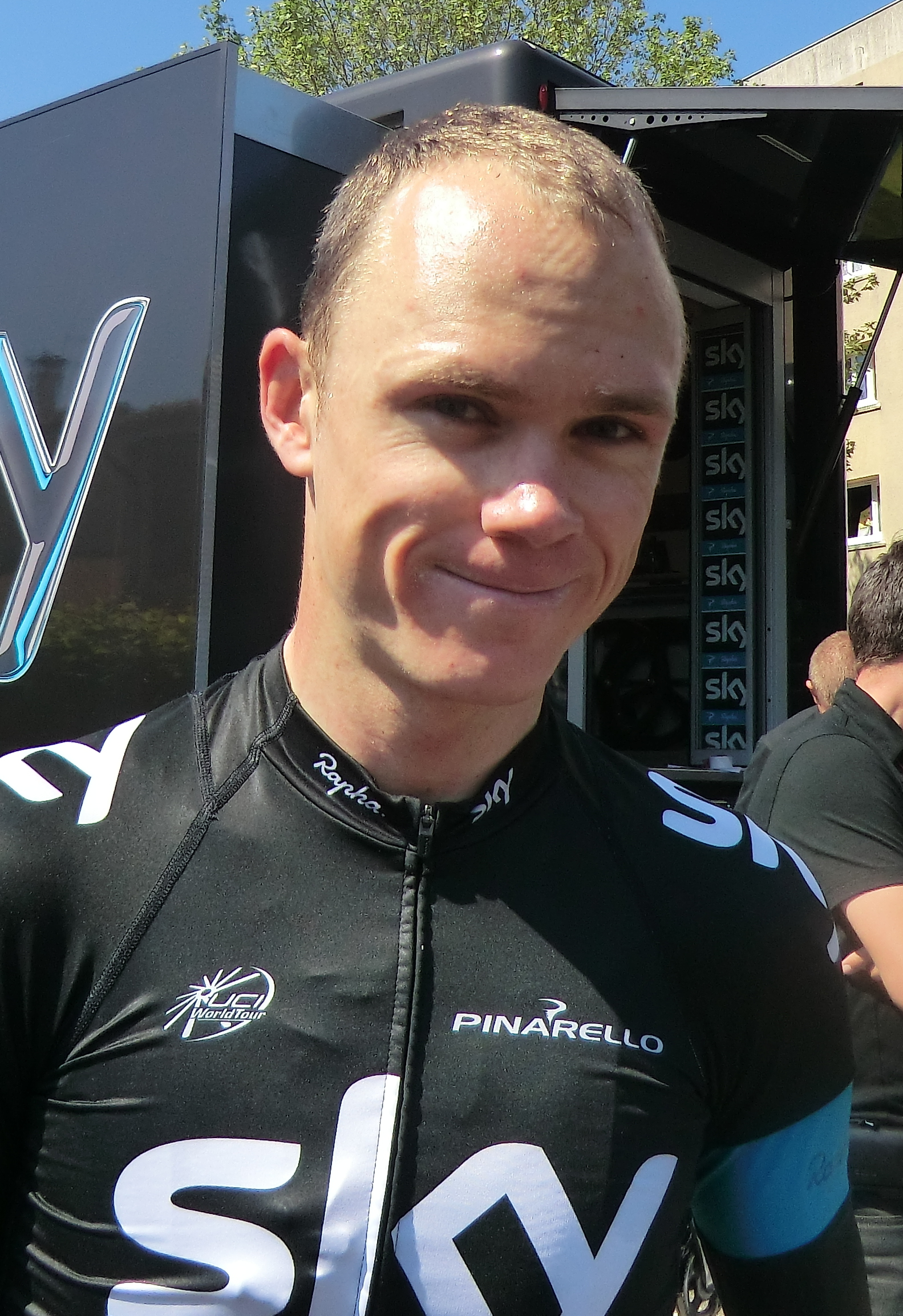
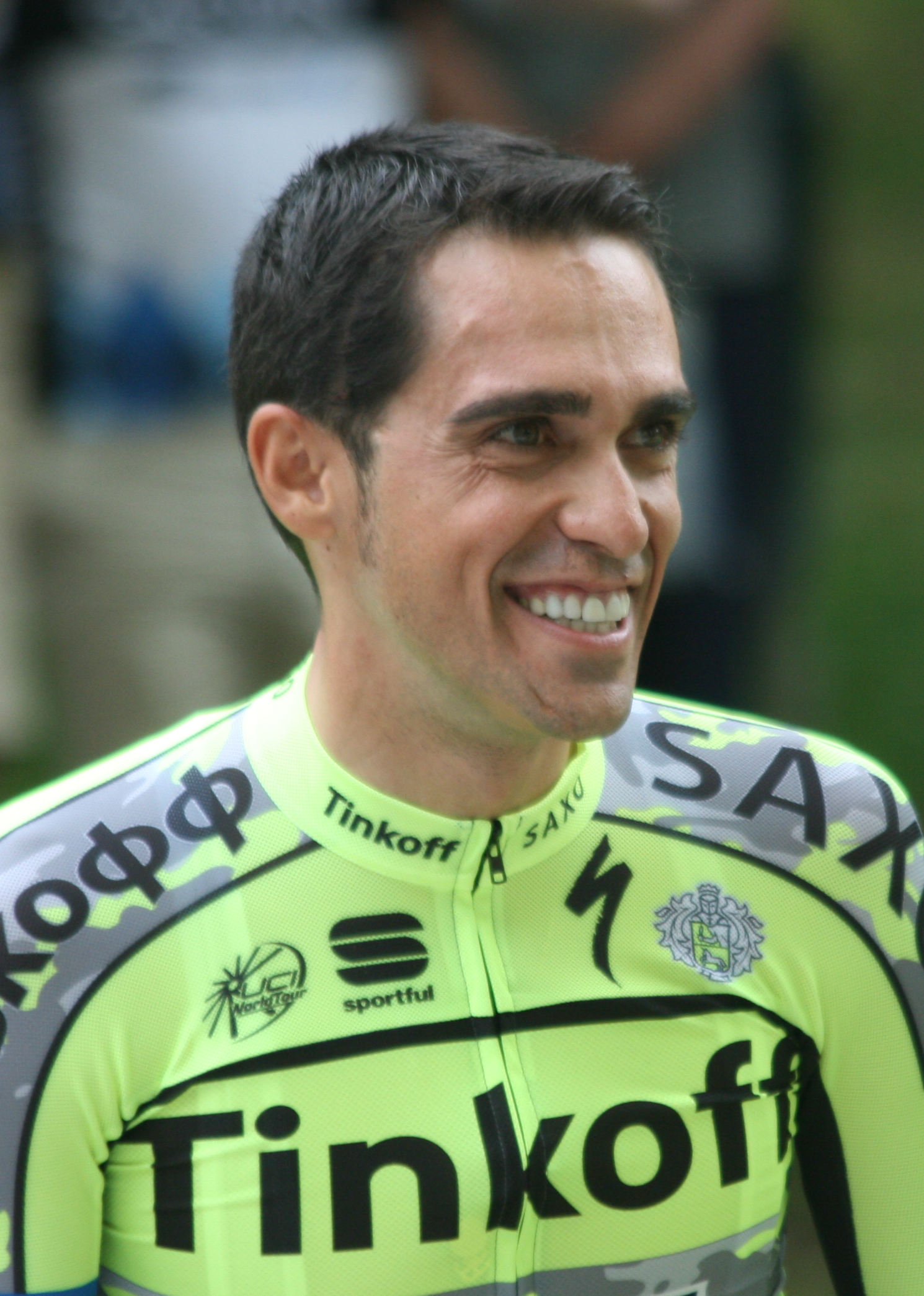
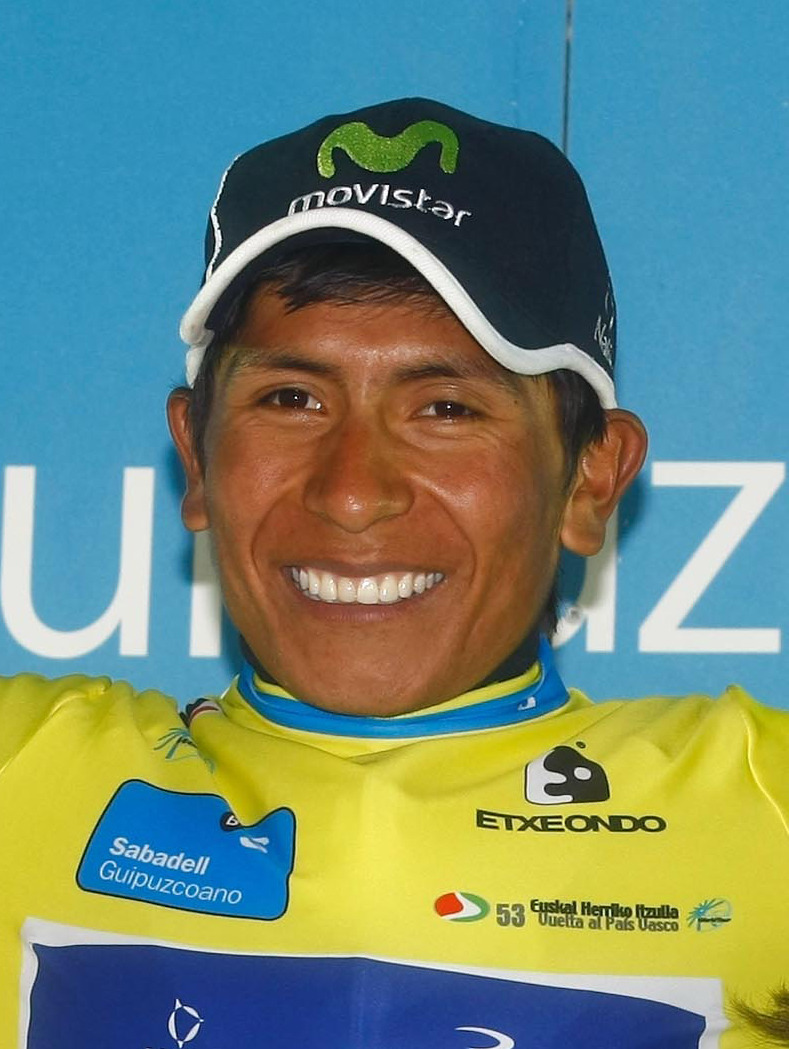
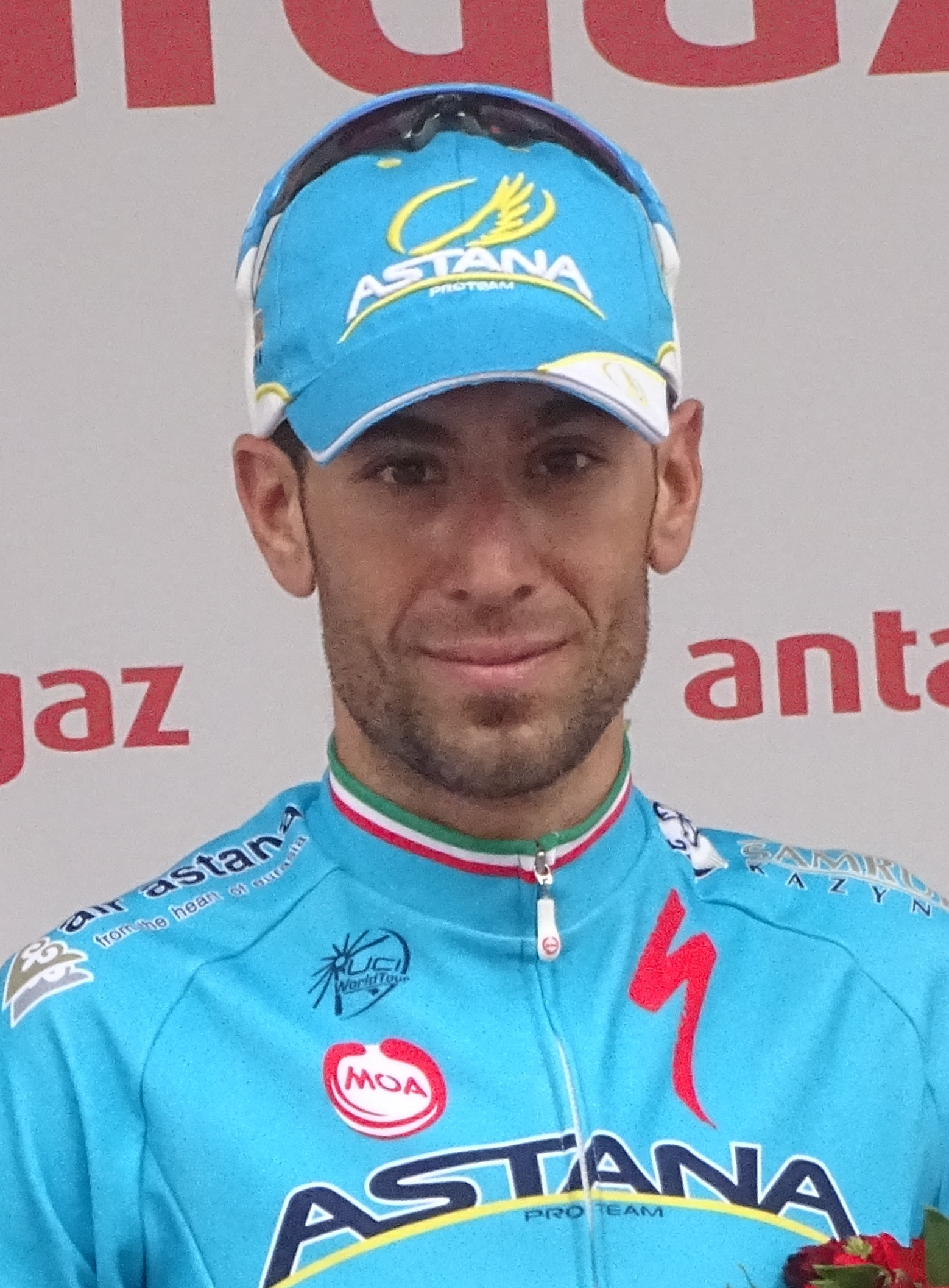
The 'big four' general classification favourites. Left-to-right from upper left: Chris Froome, Alberto Contador, Nairo Quintana and Vincenzo Nibali.

In the lead up to the Tour, the main contenders for the general classification, known in the media as the 'big four', were Chris Froome (Team Sky), Alberto Contador (Tinkoff–Saxo), Nairo Quintana (Movistar Team) and Vincenzo Nibali (Astana). All had won at least one Grand Tour, amassing a total of twenty Grand Tour podiums. Former Tour de France winners Froome (2013) and Contador (2007 and 2009) returned to the race having crashed out of the 2014 edition. The other riders considered contenders were Tejay van Garderen (BMC Racing Team), Thibaut Pinot (FDJ), Joaquim Rodríguez (Team Katusha), followed by AG2R La Mondiale's Jean-Christophe Péraud and Romain Bardet.

Froome had shown his form during the season with overall victories at the Vuelta a Andalucía and the Critérium du Dauphiné, a race considered to be the warm-up for the Tour. Contador had earlier in the season won the Giro d'Italia and was aiming to become the first rider since Marco Pantani in 1998 to achieve the Giro-Tour double. He was also aiming to hold all three Grand Tour titles simultaneously, having won the 2014 Vuelta a España. Thirteen days before the start of the Tour, Contador won the Route du Sud, defeating Quintana by seventeen seconds. Quintana placed second in the 2013 Tour, winning the mountains and young rider classifications. He was absent in 2014 as he concentrated on the Giro d'Italia, which he won. His major victory of the 2015 season was the Tirreno–Adriatico. The defending champion Nibali was considered a contender, although his best result of the season was tenth in the Tour de Romandie, and placed thirteenth at the Dauphiné.

The sprinters considered favourites for the points classification and wins on the flat or hilly bunch sprint finishes were Alexander Kristoff (Team Katusha), Mark Cavendish (Etixx–Quick-Step), André Greipel (Lotto–Soudal), Peter Sagan (Tinkoff–Saxo) and John Degenkolb (Team Giant–Alpecin). Kristoff and Cavendish both showed their form during the season coming into the Tour, with eighteen and twelve wins, respectively. Greipel was also a contender, spearheaded by his sprint train, much like Cavendish. Three-time consecutive winner of the points classification Sagan was expected to have a hard time repeating as winner due to the changes in the classification's point structure and also due to the fact he had to ride in support of Contador. Degenkolb, who won the one-day classic races Milan–San Remo and Paris–Roubaix in the season, would take the lead of the Team Giant–Alpecin team due to the absence of the 2014 Tour's four-stage winner Marcel Kittel, who was not selected due to lack of fitness.

== Route and stages ==
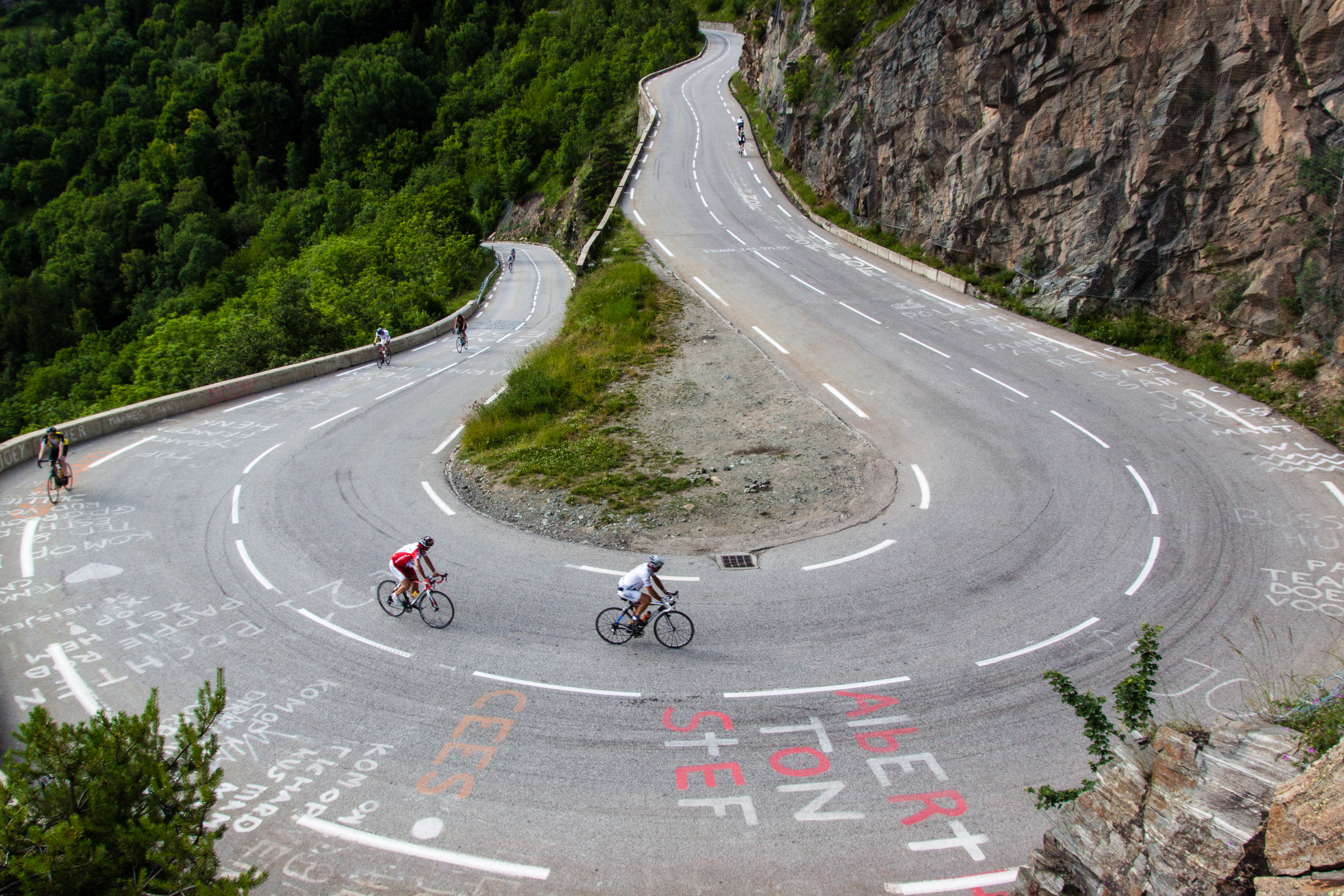
Stage twenty, the penultimate stage, concluded with the 13.8 km (8.6 mi) ascent of the Alpe d'Huez; it has an average gradient of 7.9% and features twenty-one hairpin turns.

On 8 November 2013, the ASO announced Utrecht would host the 2015 edition's opening stages (known as the Grand Départ). It was the sixth time the Tour had started in the Netherlands, a record for a country outside France. The previous five were: 1954, in Amsterdam; 1973, in Scheveningen; 1978, in Leiden; 1996, in 's-Hertogenbosch; and 2010, in Rotterdam. Utrecht paid the ASO a reported €4m to host the Grand Départ. The full route of the Tour was unveiled on 22 October 2014 at the Palais des Congrès in Paris. At the event, the race director Christian Prudhomme described it as "atypique" (English: "atypical"), adding "If you do not climb, you will not win the Tour in 2015." The most noticeable differences were the lack of time trial kilometres and the mountainous terrain.

After the first stage in Utrecht, the second stage left the city to finish in the region of Zeeland in the south of the Netherlands. The third began in Antwerp, Belgium, and concluded at the Mur de Huy, a steep climb known for its inclusion in the one-day classic race La Flèche Wallonne. Stage four started in Seraing, before ending in Cambrai, France; it featured seven cobbled sectors with a combined distance of 13 km (8.1 mi). Stages five to nine crossed northern France westwards, beginning in the region of Nord-Pas-de-Calais and ending in Brittany. A long transfer took the race to the south of the country for next three stages through the Pyrenees, which include the Tour's most climbed mountain, the Col du Tourmalet, on stage eleven. Stages 13 to 16 formed a continuous four-stage journey that navigated eastwards to the Alps; four stages took place in and around the mountain range. A second long transfer took the Tour back to the north-east to finish with the Champs-Élysées stage in Paris.

There were 21 stages in the race, covering a total distance of 3,360.3 km (2,088 mi), 298.7 km (185.6 mi) shorter than the 2014 Tour. The longest mass-start stage was the fourth at 223.5 km (139 mi), and stage 21 was the shortest at 110.5 km (69 mi). The opening individual time trial was 13.8 km (8.6 mi) – although it was too long to be classified a prologue – and the team time trial on stage 9 was 28 km (17.4 mi). Of the remaining stages, seven were officially classified as flat, five as medium mountain and seven as high mountain. Stages 3 and 8, although classified as flat, finished at the 204 m (669 ft)-high Mur de Huy and 293 m (961 ft)-high Mûr-de-Bretagne respectively. There were six summit finishes: stage 10, to La Pierre Saint-Martin; stage 11, to Cauterets; stage 12, to Plateau de Beille; stage 17, to Pra-Loup; stage 19, to La Toussuire to Les Sybelles; and stage 20, to Alpe d'Huez. On 25 June, it was announced that due to a landslide, the route of stage twenty would be changed, bypassing the Col du Galibier and instead climbing the Col de la Croix de Fer. The stage distance, however, remained intact. The highest point of elevation in the race was the 2,250 m (7,380 ft)-high Col d'Allos mountain pass on stage seventeen. There were seven hors catégorie (English: beyond category) rated climbs in the race. The Tour included six new start or finish locations. The rest days were after stage 9, in Pau, and after 16, in Gap.

Stage characteristics and winners
Stage	Date	Course	Distance	Type	Winner
1	4 July	Utrecht (Netherlands)	13.8 km (8.6 mi)	Individual time trial	Rohan Dennis (AUS)
2	5 July	Utrecht (Netherlands) to Zeeland (Note: Stage two's finish line was on the artificial island of Neeltje Jans although it was officially named as the wider region of Zeeland.) (Netherlands)	166 km (103 mi)	Flat stage	André Greipel (GER)
3	6 July	Antwerp (Belgium) to Huy (Belgium)	159.5 km (99 mi)	Medium mountain stage	Joaquim Rodríguez (ESP)
4	7 July	Seraing (Belgium) to Cambrai	223.5 km (139 mi)	Medium mountain stage	Tony Martin (GER)
5	8 July	Arras to Amiens	189.5 km (118 mi)	Flat stage	André Greipel (GER)
6	9 July	Abbeville to Le Havre	191.5 km (119 mi)	Flat stage	Zdeněk Štybar (CZE)
7	10 July	Livarot to Fougères	190.5 km (118 mi)	Flat stage	Mark Cavendish (GBR)
8	11 July	Rennes to Mûr-de-Bretagne	181.5 km (113 mi)	Medium mountain stage	Alexis Vuillermoz (FRA)
9	12 July	Vannes to Plumelec	28 km (17 mi)	Team time trial	BMC Racing Team
	13 July	Pau		Rest day	
10	14 July	Tarbes to La Pierre Saint-Martin	167 km (104 mi)	Medium mountain stage	Chris Froome (GBR)
11	15 July	Pau to Cauterets	188 km (117 mi)	High mountain stage	Rafał Majka (POL)
12	16 July	Lannemezan to Plateau de Beille	195 km (121 mi)	High mountain stage	Joaquim Rodríguez (ESP)
13	17 July	Muret to Rodez	198.5 km (123 mi)	Medium mountain stage	Greg Van Avermaet (BEL)
14	18 July	Rodez to Mende	178.5 km (111 mi)	Medium mountain stage	Steve Cummings (GBR)
15	19 July	Mende to Valence	183 km (114 mi)	Flat stage	André Greipel (GER)
16	20 July	Bourg-de-Péage to Gap	201 km (125 mi)	Medium mountain stage	Rubén Plaza Molina (ESP)
	21 July	Gap		Rest day	
17	22 July	Digne-les-Bains to Pra-Loup	161 km (100 mi)	High mountain stage	Simon Geschke (GER)
18	23 July	Gap to Saint-Jean-de-Maurienne	186.5 km (116 mi)	High mountain stage	Romain Bardet (FRA)
19	24 July	Saint-Jean-de-Maurienne to La Toussuire – Les Sybelles	138 km (86 mi)	High mountain stage	Vincenzo Nibali (ITA)
20	25 July	Modane to Alpe d'Huez	110.5 km (69 mi)	High mountain stage	Thibaut Pinot (FRA)
21	26 July	Sèvres to Paris (Champs-Élysées)	109.5 km (68 mi)	Flat stage	André Greipel (GER)
	Total		3,360.3 km (2,088 mi)		

== Race overview ==
=== Grand Départ and journey west ===
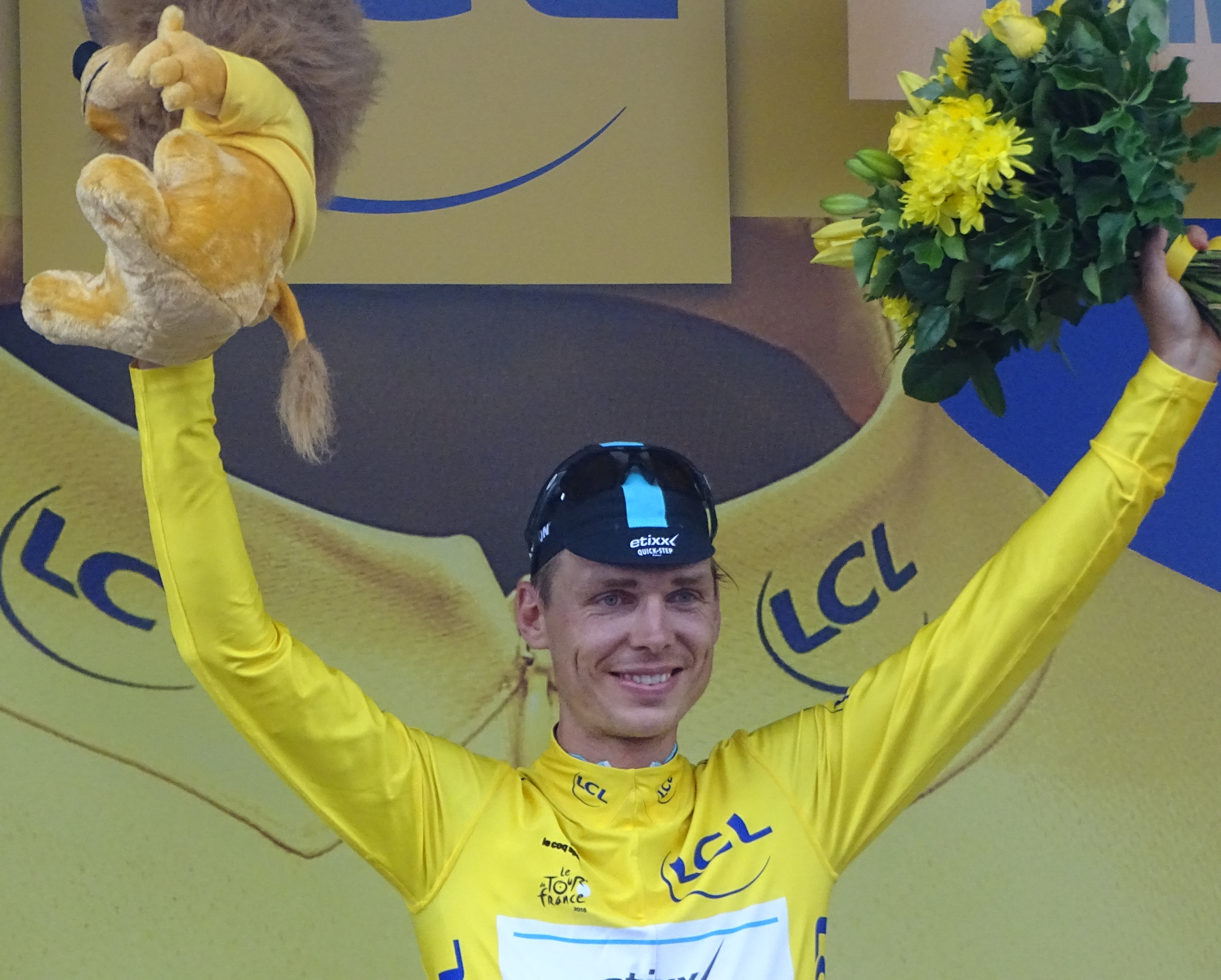
Tony Martin (Etixx–Quick-Step) waited until stage four to wear the race leader's yellow jersey after he placed second overall after each of the opening three stages. He crashed out of the Tour on stage six.

The race's opening individual time trial stage in Utrecht was won by Rohan Dennis of BMC Racing Team by a margin of five seconds over Etixx–Quick-Step's Tony Martin, with Trek Factory Racing's Fabian Cancellara a further second down. Dennis set the record for the fastest average speed in a time trial at the Tour, with 55.446 km/h (34.5 mph). His win put him in the race leader's yellow jersey. On stage two, crosswinds along the coastal route to the finish in Zeeland caused the peloton (the main group) to split into echelons, resulting in time gaps between riders. The stage ended in a bunch sprint, won by André Greipel, putting him in the green jersey as the leader of the points classification. Dennis was in a group that finished one minute twenty-eight seconds in arrears. Cancellara finished third placed in the stage and took the race lead, profiting from a time bonus missed by Martin, who came in ninth. The general classification favourites that gained time from being in the leading group of twenty-six were Chris Froome, Alberto Contador and Tejay van Garderen; the other favourites finished in the same group as Dennis. On the third stage, the race was neutralised following a major crash 58 km (36 mi) from the finish which put six of riders out of the race, including Cancellara. The peloton continued to the final climb, the Mur de Huy, where Joaquim Rodríguez held off Froome to take the stage by one second. Rodríguez was awarded the first the polka dot jersey as the leader of the mountains classification and Froome took the yellow, while also gaining time over the other general classification favourites. It was the third day in succession Martin ended in second place overall, and to three different riders. The partially cobbled fourth stage saw Martin take the victory and the yellow jersey with an attack on the lead group 3 km (1.9 mi) from the finish in Cambrai.

On the fifth stage, a bunch sprint occurred and Greipel got the better of it by beating Peter Sagan and Mark Cavendish, respectively. In the sixth stage, Zdeněk Štybar of Etixx–Quick-Step won after escaping on the concluding small ascent in the port city of Le Havre. A crash in the final kilometre forced Martin to abandon the Tour with a broken collarbone, the second yellow jersey wearer to surrender after Cancellara. A record was set after the stage, with Daniel Teklehaimanot becoming the first black African to lead the mountains classification. Although Froome now led the race, no rider wore the yellow jersey on stage seven as Martin had finished the stage and earned the right to wear it. Cavendish won the seventh from a bunch sprint in Fougères, Brittany. Froome was awarded the yellow jersey after the stage. Stage eight, finishing atop the Mûr-de-Bretagne, saw the first French victory of the Tour, with AG2R La Mondiale rider Alexis Vuillermoz launching an attack inside the final kilometre to take the victory. The general classification favourites finished together except Vincenzo Nibali who lost ten seconds. Sagan moved into the green jersey. BMC Racing Team won stage nine's team time trial by one second over Team Sky. The squad of Nairo Quintana, Movistar Team, came in third, four seconds in arrears. Alberto Contador's Tinkoff–Saxo in fourth, twenty-eight seconds down, and Nibali's Astana following, a further seven seconds behind. The first rest day took place the following day in Pau.

=== Pyrenees and Massif Central ===
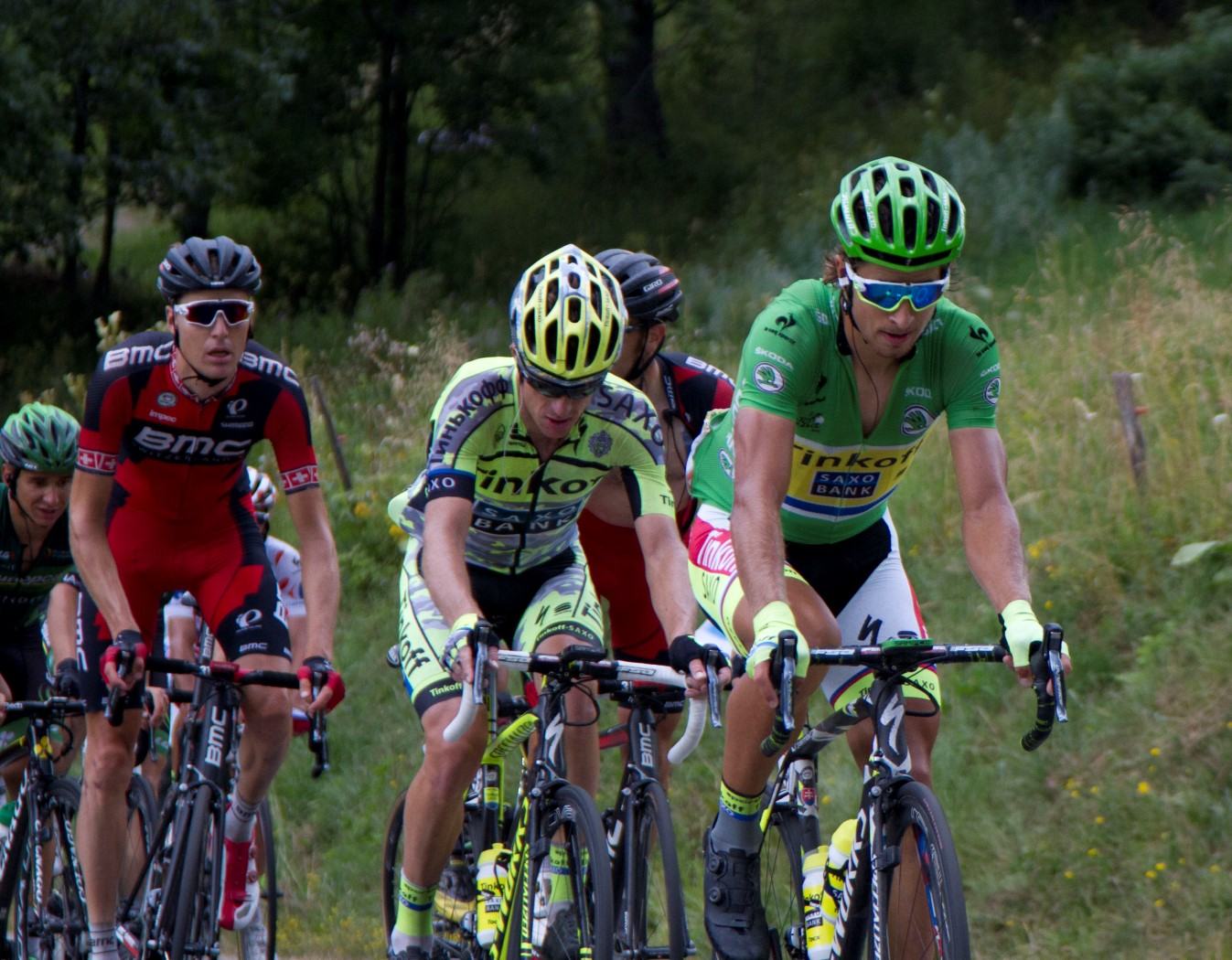
Tinkoff–Saxo's Peter Sagan (pictured in stage nineteen) held the green jersey from the end of stage eleven to the end of the Tour, claiming his fourth consecutive points classification title.

Stage ten was the race's first arrival at altitude with the finish at La Pierre Saint-Martin in the Pyrenees. The day's breakaway was caught and passed on the final climb by a select group. Froome attacked with 6.4 km (4 mi) remaining to take the win, with teammate Richie Porte and Quintana a minute in arrears. The stage saw time gaps open up across the general classification leaders. The biggest loser was Nibali, who came in twenty-first, over four minutes behind Froome, who increased his lead to second placed Tejay van Garderen to two minutes and fifty-two seconds. Froome took the polka dot jersey and Greipel the green. Stage eleven was another mountainous stage; it was won by Rafał Majka (Tinkoff–Saxo), who was part of the early breakaway and attacked on the slopes of the Col du Tourmalet. He soloed across the line in Cauterets one minute ahead of second-placed Dan Martin (Cannondale–Garmin). The green jersey returned to Sagan. Rodríguez gained his second victory of the race on stage twelve; he was part of an early twenty-two rider breakaway that reached the final climb to Plateau de Beille. Froome kept his lead intact.

Stage thirteen saw the escapees being brought inside the one kilometre to go marker (known as the flamme rouge). Greg Van Avermaet of BMC Racing Team took the uphill victory ahead of the chasing Sagan. On stage fourteen, a twenty-four rider breakaway reached the final climb, the Côte de la Croix Neuve. After the breakaway had fractured, Thibaut Pinot and Romain Bardet led over the summit, before Steve Cummings of MTN–Qhubeka overtook them to take the victory at Brenoux Airport on the plateau above Mende. Sagan was part of the breakaway, amassing maximum points at the intermediate sprint. Over four minutes after Cummings had finished, Froome outsprinted Quintana while the other general classification favourites were slightly distanced. Quintana moved into second place overall, displacing Van Garderen. Stage fifteen had for principal difficulty the Col de l'Escrinet climb, which saw most of the sprinters succeeding at passing the climb in the lead group, with the notable exception of Cavendish. Greipel won his third stage of the Tour, followed by John Degenkolb and Alexander Kristoff, respectively. On the next stage, featuring the Col de Manse as the final climb, Rubén Plaza (Lampre–Merida) escaped the leading group of breakaway riders on the ascent. Sagan chased him down the descent, but to no avail as Plaza soloed to victory in Gap. The next day was the second rest day, spent in Gap.

=== Alps and finale ===
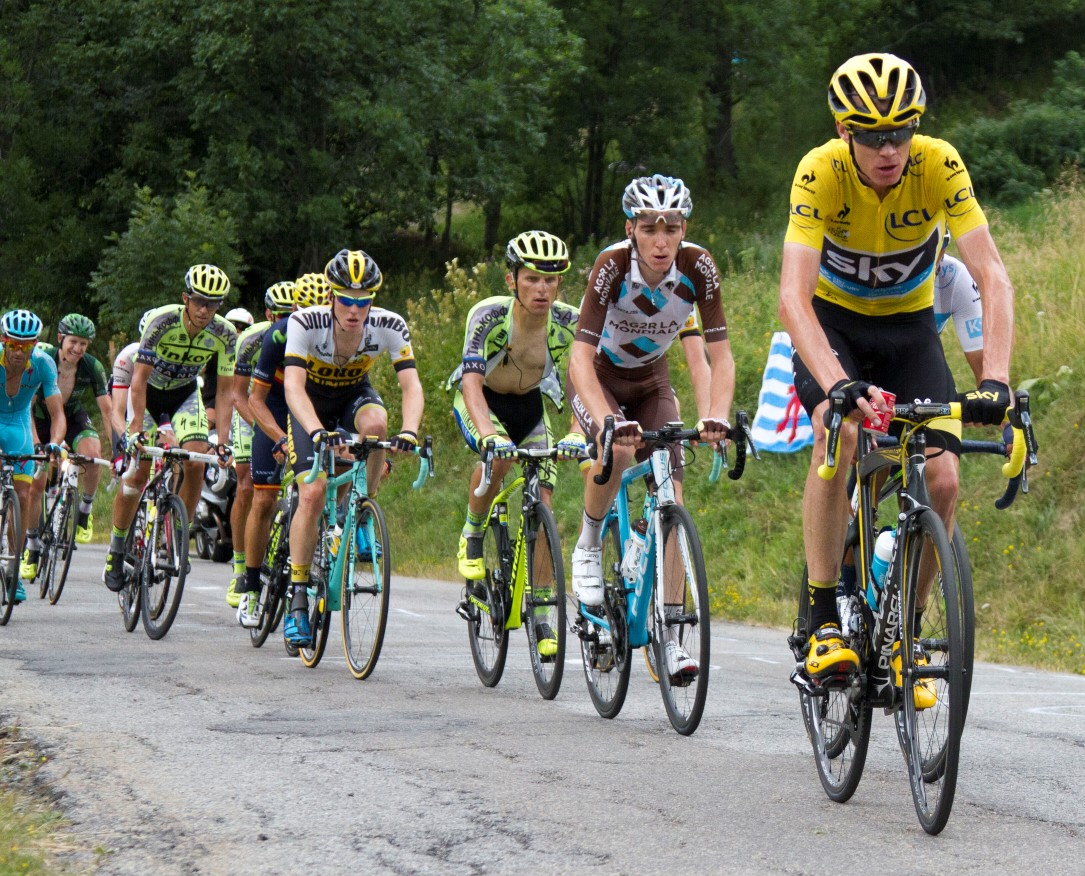
Team Sky's Chris Froome (pictured in stage nineteen) held the yellow jersey from the end of the seventh stage to the final stage, claiming his second Tour de France victory.

Stage seventeen, the first of four Alpine stages, saw third placed overall Van Garderen withdraw from the race with illness. The stage was won by Team Giant–Alpecin's Simon Geschke, who escaped from the breakaway with under 50 km (31 mi) remaining to win in Pra-Loup. Fifth placed overall Contador crashed on the descent of the Col d'Allos, losing over two minutes to race leader Froome. On stage eighteen, Bardet attacked the breakaway close to the summit of the Col du Glandon and opened a gap on descent before riding solo to victory in Saint-Jean-de-Maurienne. Bardet moved up to tenth overall and became joint first with Rodríguez in the mountains classification, displacing Froome. In the Tour's queen stage, nineteenth, Nibali broke away from the general classification group close to the summit of the Col de la Croix de Fer to bridge and pass the breakaway group and win at La Toussuire - Les Sybelles. Quintana came in second, forty-four seconds later, with Froome coming in a further thirty. In the Tour's penultimate stage, a select group of riders attacked on the Col de la Croix de Fer and made it to the finish on Alpe d'Huez, where they met the disintegrate early breakaway. Pinot attacked passed the breakaways to take the victory ahead of the encroaching Quintana, who came in second after attacking the chasing general classification group on the Alpe. Quintana gained a margin of eighty seconds over Froome, but it was not enough and had to settle for second place overall.

The final stage in Paris was won by Greipel, his fourth victory of this year's Tour. Froome finished the race to claim his second Tour de France, becoming the first British rider to win the race on two occasions. He beat second-placed Quintana by seventy-two seconds, with his Movistar Team teammate Alejandro Valverde third. Froome also claimed the mountains classification, the first time a rider had won both since Eddy Merckx in 1970. Although he failed to win any stages during the race, Sagan won his fourth consecutive points classification with a total of 432, 66 ahead of Greipel in second. The best young rider was Quintana, followed by Bardet and Team Giant–Alpecin's Warren Barguil, respectively. Movistar Team finished as the winners of the team classification, over fifty-seven minutes ahead of second-placed Team Sky. Of the 198 starters, 160 reached the finish of the last stage in Paris.

== Classification leadership and minor prizes ==
There were four main individual classifications contested in the 2015 Tour de France, as well as a team competition. The most important was the general classification, which was calculated by adding each rider's finishing times on each stage. Time bonuses (time subtracted) returned to the Tour for the first time since the 2008 edition. For all stage finishes, excluding the two time trial stages, the three first finishers of stages earned bonuses of 10, 6 and 4 seconds respectively. Of the reintroduction, race director Christian Prudhomme said: "We want to open up the race, we want the race to be decided on any day of the Tour." If a crash had happened within the final 3 km (1.9 mi) of a stage, not including time trials and summit finishes, the riders involved would have received the same time as the group they were in when the crash occurred. The rider with the lowest cumulative time was the winner of the general classification and was considered the overall winner of the Tour. The rider leading the classification wore a yellow jersey. Rain on the final stage forced the final times of the general classification to be taken on the first crossing of the finish line before the ten laps of the cobbled Champs-Élysées. Riders were required to cross the finish line on the final lap to receive their times.

Points classification points for the top 15 positions by type
Type	1	2	3	4	5	6	7	8	9	10	11	12	13	14	15
Flat stage	50	30	20	18	16	14	12	10	8	7	6	5	4	3	2
Medium mountain stage	30	25	22	19	17	15	13	11	9	7	6	5	4	3	2
High mountain stage	20	17	15	13	11	10	9	8	7	6	5	4	3	2	1
Individual time trial	20	17	15	13	11	10	9	8	7	6	5	4	3	2	1
Intermediate sprint	20	17	15	13	11	10	9	8	7	6	5	4	3	2	1

The second classification was the points classification. Riders received points for finishing among the highest placed in a stage finish, or in intermediate sprints during the stage. The points system was also changed. A stage win was worth 50 points instead of 45, second place awarded 30 instead of 35 and third 20 instead of 30. The sprint points rule change aimed to make a stage win more valuable. The points available for each stage finish were determined by the stage's type. The new system was in effect only on the Tour's six stages classified as flat (stages 2, 5, 6, 7, 15 and 21). On seven stages (the cobble stage and six hillier stages, namely stages 3, 4, 8, 10, 13, 14 and 16) the rider who won received 30 points, 25 for the second rider, and so on. For the mountain stages (stages 11, 12, 17, 18, 19, 20) and the individual time trial (stage 1), the winner received 20 points. No points were awarded for the team time trial on stage nine. The leader was identified by a green jersey.

The third classification was the mountains classification. Points were awarded to the riders that reached the summit of the most difficult climbs first. The climbs were categorised as fourth-, third-, second-, first-category and hors catégorie, with the more difficult climbs rated lower. Double points were awarded on the summit finishes on stages 10, 12, 17, 19 and 20. The leader wore a white jersey with red polka dots.

The final individual classification was the young rider classification. This was calculated the same way as the general classification, but the classification was restricted to riders who were born on or after 1 January 1990. The leader wore a white jersey.

The final classification was a team classification. This was calculated using the finishing times of the best three riders per team on each stage, excluding the team time trial; the leading team was the team with the lowest cumulative time. The number of stage victories and placings per team determined the outcome of a tie. The riders in the team that lead this classification were identified with yellow number bibs on the back of their jerseys and yellow helmets.

In addition, there was a combativity award given after each stage to the rider considered, by a jury, to have "made the greatest effort and who has demonstrated the best qualities of sportsmanship". No combativity awards were given for the time trials and the final stage. The winner wore a red number bib the following stage. At the conclusion of the Tour, Romain Bardet won the overall super-combativity award, again, decided by a jury.

A total of €2,030,150 was awarded in cash prizes in the race. The overall winner of the general classification received €450,000, with the second and third placed riders got €200,000 and €100,000 respectively. All finishers of the race were awarded with money. The holders of the classifications benefited on each stage they led; the final winners of the points and mountains were given €25,000, while the best young rider and most combative rider got €20,000. Team prizes were available, with €10,000 for the winner of team time trial and €50,000 for the winners of the team classification. €8,000 was given to the winners of each stage of the race. There were also two special awards each with a prize of €5000, the Souvenir Jacques Goddet, given to the first rider to pass Goddet's memorial at the summit of the Col du Tourmalet in stage eleven, and the Souvenir Henri Desgrange, given in honour of Tour founder Henri Desgrange to the first rider to pass the summit of the Col du Galibier in stage twenty. Due to a route change the Souvenir Henri Desgrange was replaced with the Col d'Allos in stage seventeen. Rafał Majka won the Jacques Goddet and Simon Geschke won the Henri Desgrange.

Classification leadership by stage
Stage	Winner	General classification	Points classification	Mountains classification	Young rider classification	Team classification	Combativity award
1	Rohan Dennis	Rohan Dennis	Rohan Dennis	no award	Rohan Dennis	LottoNL–Jumbo	no award
2	André Greipel	Fabian Cancellara	André Greipel	no award	Tom Dumoulin	BMC Racing Team	Michał Kwiatkowski
3	Joaquim Rodríguez	Chris Froome	André Greipel	Joaquim Rodríguez	Peter Sagan	BMC Racing Team	Jan Bárta
4	Tony Martin	Tony Martin	André Greipel	Joaquim Rodríguez	Peter Sagan	BMC Racing Team	Vincenzo Nibali
5	André Greipel	Tony Martin	André Greipel	Joaquim Rodríguez	Peter Sagan	BMC Racing Team	Michael Matthews
6	Zdeněk Štybar	Tony Martin	André Greipel	Daniel Teklehaimanot	Peter Sagan	BMC Racing Team	Perrig Quéméneur
7	Mark Cavendish	Chris Froome	André Greipel	Daniel Teklehaimanot	Peter Sagan	BMC Racing Team	Anthony Delaplace
8	Alexis Vuillermoz	Chris Froome	Peter Sagan	Daniel Teklehaimanot	Peter Sagan	BMC Racing Team	Bartosz Huzarski
9	BMC Racing Team	Chris Froome	Peter Sagan	Daniel Teklehaimanot	Peter Sagan	BMC Racing Team	no award
10	Chris Froome	Chris Froome	André Greipel	Chris Froome	Nairo Quintana	Team Sky	Kenneth Vanbilsen
11	Rafał Majka	Chris Froome	Peter Sagan	Chris Froome	Nairo Quintana	Team Sky	Dan Martin
12	Joaquim Rodríguez	Chris Froome	Peter Sagan	Chris Froome	Nairo Quintana	Movistar Team	Michał Kwiatkowski
13	Greg Van Avermaet	Chris Froome	Peter Sagan	Chris Froome	Nairo Quintana	Movistar Team	Thomas De Gendt
14	Steve Cummings	Chris Froome	Peter Sagan	Chris Froome	Nairo Quintana	Movistar Team	Pierre-Luc Périchon
15	André Greipel	Chris Froome	Peter Sagan	Chris Froome	Nairo Quintana	Movistar Team	Peter Sagan
16	Rubén Plaza	Chris Froome	Peter Sagan	Chris Froome	Nairo Quintana	Movistar Team	Peter Sagan
17	Simon Geschke	Chris Froome	Peter Sagan	Chris Froome	Nairo Quintana	Movistar Team	Simon Geschke
18	Romain Bardet	Chris Froome	Peter Sagan	Joaquim Rodríguez	Nairo Quintana	Movistar Team	Romain Bardet
19	Vincenzo Nibali	Chris Froome	Peter Sagan	Romain Bardet	Nairo Quintana	Movistar Team	Pierre Rolland
20	Thibaut Pinot	Chris Froome	Peter Sagan	Chris Froome	Nairo Quintana	Movistar Team	Alexandre Geniez
21	André Greipel	Chris Froome	Peter Sagan	Chris Froome	Nairo Quintana	Movistar Team	no award
Final		Chris Froome	Peter Sagan	Chris Froome	Nairo Quintana	Movistar Team	Romain Bardet

- In stage two, Tony Martin, who was second in the points classification, wore the green jersey, because first placed Rohan Dennis wore the yellow jersey as leader of the general classification. Additionally, Tom Dumoulin, who was second in the young rider classification, wore the white jersey for the same reason.
- In stage seven, no rider wore the yellow jersey after Tony Martin, who was first in the general classification, withdrew from the race due to injury.
- In stage nine, Warren Barguil, who was second in the young rider classification, wore the white jersey, because Peter Sagan wore the green jersey as leader of the points classification.
- In stage ten, Nairo Quintana, who was second in the young rider classification, wore the white jersey, because Peter Sagan wore the green jersey as leader of the points classification. Additionally, Bartosz Huzarski, awarded in stage eight, wore the red number bib as no combativity award was awarded after stage nine.
- In stages eleven and twelve, Richie Porte, who was second in the mountains classification, wore the polka dot jersey, because Chris Froome wore the yellow jersey as leader of the general classification.
- In stages thirteen to eighteen, Joaquim Rodríguez, who was second in the mountains classification, wore the polka dot jersey, because Chris Froome wore the yellow jersey as leader of the general classification.
- In stage twenty one, Romain Bardet, who was third in the mountains classification, wore the polka dot jersey, because Chris Froome wore the yellow jersey as leader of the general classification and Nairo Quintana, who was second wore the white jersey as leader of the young rider classification.

== Final standings ==
Legend
A yellow jersey.	Denotes the winner of the general classification	A green jersey.	Denotes the winner of the points classification
A white jersey with red polka dots.	Denotes the winner of the mountains classification	A white jersey.	Denotes the winner of the young rider classification
A white jersey with a yellow number bib.	Denotes the winner of the team classification	A white jersey with a red number bib.	Denotes the winner of the super-combativity award

=== General classification ===
Final general classification (1–10)
Rank	Rider	Team	Time
1	Chris Froome (GBR)	Team Sky	84h 46' 14"
2	Nairo Quintana (COL)	Movistar Team	+ 1' 12"
3	Alejandro Valverde (ESP)	Movistar Team	+ 5' 25"
4	Vincenzo Nibali (ITA)	Astana	+ 8' 36"
5	Alberto Contador (ESP)	Tinkoff–Saxo	+ 9' 48"
6	Robert Gesink (NED)	LottoNL–Jumbo	+ 10' 47"
7	Bauke Mollema (NED)	Trek Factory Racing	+ 15' 14"
8	Mathias Frank (SUI)	IAM Cycling	+ 15' 39"
9	Romain Bardet (FRA)	AG2R La Mondiale	+ 16' 00"
10	Pierre Rolland (FRA)	Team Europcar	+ 17' 30"

Final general classification (11–160)
Rank	Rider	Team	Time
11	Andrew Talansky (USA)	Cannondale–Garmin	+ 22' 06"
12	Samuel Sánchez (ESP)	BMC Racing Team	+ 22' 50"
13	Serge Pauwels (BEL)	MTN–Qhubeka	+ 31' 03"
14	Warren Barguil (FRA)	Team Giant–Alpecin	+ 31' 15"
15	Geraint Thomas (GBR)	Team Sky	+ 31' 39"
16	Thibaut Pinot (FRA)	FDJ	+ 38' 52"
17	Roman Kreuziger (CZE)	Tinkoff–Saxo	+ 1h 02' 51"
18	Mikaël Cherel (FRA)	AG2R La Mondiale	+ 1h 05' 00"
19	Jarlinson Pantano (COL)	IAM Cycling	+ 1h 09' 08"
20	Jan Bakelants (BEL)	AG2R La Mondiale	+ 1h 16' 36"
21	Steven Kruijswijk (NED)	LottoNL–Jumbo	+ 1h 21' 27"
22	Tanel Kangert (EST)	Astana	+ 1h 24' 58"
23	Jakob Fuglsang (DEN)	Astana	+ 1h 25' 23"
24	Jonathan Castroviejo (ESP)	Movistar Team	+ 1h 26' 05"
25	Jan Bárta (CZE)	Bora–Argon 18	+ 1h 26' 56"
26	Alexis Vuillermoz (FRA)	AG2R La Mondiale	+ 1h 28' 29"
27	Bob Jungels (LUX)	Trek Factory Racing	+ 1h 33' 21"
28	Rafał Majka (POL)	Tinkoff–Saxo	+ 1h 35' 06"
29	Joaquim Rodríguez (ESP)	Team Katusha	+ 1h 36' 07"
30	Rubén Plaza (ESP)	Lampre–Merida	+ 1h 38' 22"
31	Tony Gallopin (FRA)	Lotto–Soudal	+ 1h 40' 44"
32	Gorka Izagirre (ESP)	Movistar Team	+ 1h 41' 34"
33	Romain Sicard (FRA)	Team Europcar	+ 1h 51' 32"
34	Cyril Gautier (FRA)	Team Europcar	+ 1h 51' 51"
35	Nicolas Roche (IRE)	Team Sky	+ 1h 54' 08"
36	Michael Rogers (AUS)	Tinkoff–Saxo	+ 1h 56' 13"
37	Lars Bak (DEN)	Lotto–Soudal	+ 1h 56' 57"
38	Simon Geschke (GER)	Team Giant–Alpecin	+ 1h 58' 14"
39	Dan Martin (IRL)	Cannondale–Garmin	+ 2h 03' 37"
40	Ryder Hesjedal (CAN)	Cannondale–Garmin	+ 2h 04' 37"
41	Michele Scarponi (ITA)	Astana	+ 2h 05' 03"
42	Rigoberto Urán (COL)	Etixx–Quick-Step	+ 2h 08' 20"
43	Luis Ángel Maté (ESP)	Cofidis	+ 2h 10' 12"
44	Wout Poels (NED)	Team Sky	+ 2h 12' 44"
45	Thomas Voeckler (FRA)	Team Europcar	+ 2h 14' 08"
46	Peter Sagan (SVK)	Tinkoff–Saxo	+ 2h 14' 55"
47	Nelson Oliveira (POR)	Lampre–Merida	+ 2h 15' 32"
48	Richie Porte (AUS)	Team Sky	+ 2h 16' 05"
49	Daniel Teklehaimanot (ERI)	MTN–Qhubeka	+ 2h 16' 15"
50	Adam Yates (GBR)	Orica–GreenEDGE	+ 2h 16' 36"
51	Jacques Janse van Rensburg (RSA)	MTN–Qhubeka	+ 2h 18' 16"
52	Pierrick Fédrigo (FRA)	Bretagne–Séché Environnement	+ 2h 22' 54"
53	Damiano Caruso (ITA)	BMC Racing Team	+ 2h 26' 32"
54	Sylvain Chavanel (FRA)	IAM Cycling	+ 2h 29' 28"
55	Bram Tankink (NED)	LottoNL–Jumbo	+ 2h 30' 12"
56	Michael Schär (SWI)	BMC Racing Team	+ 2h 31' 13"
57	Winner Anacona (COL)	Movistar Team	+ 2h 31' 14"
58	Alberto Losada (ESP)	Team Katusha	+ 2h 32' 30"
59	Stef Clement (NED)	IAM Cycling	+ 2h 33' 42"
60	Marcel Wyss (SWI)	IAM Cycling	+ 2h 34' 38"
61	Jean-Christophe Péraud (FRA)	AG2R La Mondiale	+ 2h 35' 10"
62	Haimar Zubeldia (ESP)	Trek Factory Racing	+ 2h 36' 50"
63	Danilo Wyss (SWI)	BMC Racing Team	+ 2h 37' 17"
64	Andriy Hryvko (UKR)	Astana	+ 2h 38' 06"
65	José Herrada (ESP)	Movistar Team	+ 2h 40' 06"
66	Daniel Navarro (ESP)	Cofidis	+ 2h 43' 34"
67	Thomas De Gendt (BEL)	Lotto–Soudal	+ 2h 48' 02"
68	Christophe Riblon (FRA)	AG2R La Mondiale	+ 2h 48' 19"
69	Kristijan Koren (SLO)	Cannondale–Garmin	+ 2h 51' 44"
70	Leopold König (CZE)	Team Sky	+ 2h 53' 09"
71	Mathieu Ladagnous (FRA)	FDJ	+ 2h 53' 22"
72	Tiago Machado (POR)	Team Katusha	+ 2h 54' 31"
73	Koen de Kort (NED)	Team Giant–Alpecin	+ 2h 57' 05"
74	Perrig Quéméneur (FRA)	Team Europcar	+ 2h 57' 19"
75	Reto Hollenstein (SWI)	IAM Cycling	+ 2h 58' 30"
76	Kristijan Đurasek (CRO)	Lampre–Merida	+ 3h 02' 14"
77	Lieuwe Westra (NED)	Astana	+ 3h 03' 09"
78	Rafael Valls (ESP)	Lampre–Merida	+ 3h 03' 11"
79	Wilco Kelderman (NED)	LottoNL–Jumbo	+ 3h 04' 07"
80	Paul Martens (GER)	LottoNL–Jumbo	+ 3h 04' 52"
81	Pierre-Luc Périchon (FRA)	Bretagne–Séché Environnement	+ 3h 05' 48"
82	Edvald Boasson Hagen (NOR)	MTN–Qhubeka	+ 3h 08' 02"
83	Emanuel Buchmann (GER)	Bora–Argon 18	+ 3h 08' 47"
84	Merhawi Kudus (ERI)	MTN–Qhubeka	+ 3h 10' 36"
85	Anthony Delaplace (FRA)	Bretagne–Séché Environnement	+ 3h 11' 28"
86	Steve Cummings (GBR)	MTN–Qhubeka	+ 3h 12' 23"
87	Georg Preidler (AUT)	Team Giant–Alpecin	+ 3h 14' 14"
88	Florian Vachon (FRA)	Bretagne–Séché Environnement	+ 3h 15' 01"
89	Simon Yates (GBR)	Orica–GreenEDGE	+ 3h 16' 04"
90	Giampaolo Caruso (ITA)	Team Katusha	+ 3h 17' 03"
91	Angelo Tulik (FRA)	Team Europcar	+ 3h 18' 24"
92	Laurens ten Dam (NED)	LottoNL–Jumbo	+ 3h 18' 43"
93	Markel Irizar (ESP)	Trek Factory Racing	+ 3h 19' 44"
94	Julien Simon (FRA)	Cofidis	+ 3h 19' 53"
95	Michał Gołaś (POL)	Etixx–Quick-Step	+ 3h 21' 17"
96	Reinardt Janse van Rensburg (RSA)	MTN–Qhubeka	+ 3h 21' 30"
97	Daniel Oss (ITA)	BMC Racing Team	+ 3h 22' 14"
98	Brice Feillu (FRA)	Bretagne–Séché Environnement	+ 3h 23' 11"
99	Paul Voss (GER)	Bora–Argon 18	+ 3h 24' 53"
100	Martin Elmiger (SWI)	IAM Cycling	+ 3h 26' 47"
101	Rohan Dennis (AUS)	BMC Racing Team	+ 3h 27' 34"
102	Grégory Rast (SWI)	Trek Factory Racing	+ 3h 29' 00"
103	Zdeněk Štybar (CZE)	Etixx–Quick-Step	+ 3h 30' 13"
104	Sep Vanmarcke (BEL)	LottoNL–Jumbo	+ 3h 31' 15"
105	Jérémy Roy (FRA)	FDJ	+ 3h 32' 12"
106	Roy Curvers (NED)	Team Giant–Alpecin	+ 3h 35' 40"
107	Adriano Malori (ITA)	Movistar Team	+ 3h 37' 28"
108	Bartosz Huzarski (POL)	Bora–Argon 18	+ 3h 38' 06"
109	John Degenkolb (GER)	Team Giant–Alpecin	+ 3h 39' 43"
110	Bryan Coquard (FRA)	Team Europcar	+ 3h 42' 36"
111	Nicolas Edet (FRA)	Cofidis	+ 3h 42' 42"
112	Alexandre Geniez (FRA)	FDJ	+ 3h 42' 57"
113	Benoît Vaugrenard (FRA)	FDJ	+ 3h 43' 08"
114	Adam Hansen (AUS)	Lotto–Soudal	+ 3h 45' 18"
115	Imanol Erviti (ESP)	Movistar Team	+ 3h 47' 14"
116	Julien Vermote (BEL)	Etixx–Quick-Step	+ 3h 50' 32"
117	Matteo Trentin (ITA)	Etixx–Quick-Step	+ 3h 50' 59"
118	Matteo Bono (ITA)	Lampre–Merida	+ 3h 52' 17"
119	Armindo Fonseca (FRA)	Bretagne–Séché Environnement	+ 3h 53' 13"
120	Manuel Quinziato (ITA)	BMC Racing Team	+ 3h 53' 21"
121	Jos van Emden (NED)	LottoNL–Jumbo	+ 3h 54' 19"
122	José Serpa (COL)	Lampre–Merida	+ 3h 54' 25"
123	Geoffrey Soupe (FRA)	Cofidis	+ 3h 55' 35"
124	Julián Arredondo (COL)	Trek Factory Racing	+ 3h 56' 49"
125	Filippo Pozzato (ITA)	Lampre–Merida	+ 3h 58' 20"
126	Marco Haller (AUT)	Team Katusha	+ 3h 59' 04"
127	Christophe Laporte (FRA)	Cofidis	+ 3h 59' 10"
128	Ian Stannard (GBR)	Team Sky	+ 3h 59' 37"
129	Tim Wellens (BEL)	Lotto–Soudal	+ 3h 59' 39"
130	Alexander Kristoff (NOR)	Team Katusha	+ 4h 01' 06"
131	Dmitriy Gruzdev (KAZ)	Astana	+ 4h 01' 12"
132	Matteo Tosatto (ITA)	Tinkoff–Saxo	+ 4h 01' 15"
133	Arnaud Gérard (FRA)	Bretagne–Séché Environnement	+ 4h 02' 06"
134	André Greipel (GER)	Lotto–Soudal	+ 4h 03' 28"
135	Florian Sénéchal (FRA)	Cofidis	+ 4h 04' 06"
136	Luke Rowe (GBR)	Team Sky	+ 4h 04' 45"
137	Yohann Gène (FRA)	Team Europcar	+ 4h 04' 56"
138	Arnaud Démare (FRA)	FDJ	+ 4h 05' 28"
139	Albert Timmer (NED)	Team Giant–Alpecin	+ 4h 05' 30"
140	José Mendes (POR)	Bora–Argon 18	+ 4h 07' 47"
141	Frédéric Brun (FRA)	Bretagne–Séché Environnement	+ 4h 10' 32"
142	Mark Cavendish (GBR)	Etixx–Quick-Step	+ 4h 12' 05"
143	Ramūnas Navardauskas (LTU)	Cannondale–Garmin	+ 4h 14' 40"
144	Pieter Weening (NED)	Orica–GreenEDGE	+ 4h 15' 20"
145	Jens Debusschere (BEL)	Lotto–Soudal	+ 4h 16' 06"
146	Damien Gaudin (FRA)	AG2R La Mondiale	+ 4h 16' 13"
147	Dylan van Baarle (NED)	Cannondale–Garmin	+ 4h 18' 40"
148	Stijn Devolder (BEL)	Trek Factory Racing	+ 4h 21' 31"
149	Jacopo Guarnieri (ITA)	Team Katusha	+ 4h 22' 20"
150	Marcel Sieberg (GER)	Lotto–Soudal	+ 4h 24' 52"
151	Luke Durbridge (AUS)	Orica–GreenEDGE	+ 4h 25' 03"
152	Michael Matthews (AUS)	Orica–GreenEDGE	+ 4h 26' 33"
153	Tom Leezer (NED)	LottoNL–Jumbo	+ 4h 26' 47"
154	Tyler Farrar (USA)	MTN–Qhubeka	+ 4h 32' 32"
155	Davide Cimolai (ITA)	Lampre–Merida	+ 4h 33' 21"
156	Matthias Brändle (AUT)	IAM Cycling	+ 4h 37' 36"
157	Bryan Nauleau (FRA)	Team Europcar	+ 4h 40' 12"
158	Kenneth Vanbilsen (BEL)	Cofidis	+ 4h 41' 27"
159	Svein Tuft (CAN)	Orica–GreenEDGE	+ 4h 48' 08"
160	Sébastien Chavanel (FRA)	FDJ	+ 4h 56' 59"

=== Points classification ===
Final points classification (1–10)
Rank	Rider	Team	Points
1	Peter Sagan (SVK)	Tinkoff–Saxo	432
2	André Greipel (GER)	Lotto–Soudal	366
3	John Degenkolb (GER)	Team Giant–Alpecin	298
4	Mark Cavendish (GBR)	Etixx–Quick-Step	206
5	Bryan Coquard (FRA)	Team Europcar	152
6	Chris Froome (GBR)	Team Sky	139
7	Thibaut Pinot (FRA)	FDJ	113
8	Alejandro Valverde (ESP)	Movistar Team	103
9	Thomas de Gendt (BEL)	Lotto–Soudal	90
10	Alexander Kristoff (NOR)	Team Katusha	90

=== Mountains classification ===
Final mountains classification (1–10)
Rank	Rider	Team	Points
1	Chris Froome (GBR)	Team Sky	119
2	Nairo Quintana (COL)	Movistar Team	108
3	Romain Bardet (FRA)	AG2R La Mondiale	90
4	Thibaut Pinot (FRA)	FDJ	82
5	Joaquim Rodríguez (ESP)	Team Katusha	78
6	Pierre Rolland (FRA)	Team Europcar	74
7	Alejandro Valverde (SPA)	Movistar Team	72
8	Jakob Fuglsang (DEN)	Astana	64
9	Richie Porte (AUS)	Team Sky	58
10	Serge Pauwels (BEL)	MTN–Qhubeka	55

=== Young rider classification ===
Final young rider classification (1–10)
Rank	Rider	Team	Time
1	Nairo Quintana (COL)	Movistar Team	84h 47' 26"
2	Romain Bardet (FRA)	AG2R La Mondiale	+ 14' 48"
3	Warren Barguil (FRA)	Team Giant–Alpecin	+ 30' 03"
4	Thibaut Pinot (FRA)	FDJ	+ 37' 40"
5	Bob Jungels (LUX)	Trek Factory Racing	+ 1h 32' 09"
6	Peter Sagan (SVK)	Tinkoff–Saxo	+ 2h 13' 43"
7	Adam Yates (GBR)	Orica–GreenEDGE	+ 2h 15' 24"
8	Wilco Kelderman (NED)	LottoNL–Jumbo	+ 3h 02' 55"
9	Emanuel Buchmann (GER)	Bora–Argon 18	+ 3h 07' 35"
10	Merhawi Kudus (ERI)	MTN–Qhubeka	+ 3h 09' 24"

=== Team classification ===
Final team classification (1–10)
Rank	Team	Time
1	(Spain) Movistar Team	255h 24' 24"
2	(United Kingdom) Team Sky	+ 57' 23"
3	Tinkoff–Saxo	+ 1h 00' 12"
4	(Kazakhstan) Astana	+ 1h 12' 09"
5	(South Africa) MTN–Qhubeka	+ 1h 14' 32"
6	(France) AG2R La Mondiale	+ 1h 24' 22"
7	(France) Team Europcar	+ 1h 48' 51"
8	(United States) BMC Racing Team	+ 2h 41' 46"
9	(Switzerland) IAM Cycling	+ 2h 42' 16"
10	(Netherlands) LottoNL–Jumbo	+ 2h 46' 59"

== UCI World Tour rankings ==
Riders from the WorldTeams competing individually, as well as for their teams and nations, for points that contributed towards the World Tour rankings. Points were awarded to the top twenty finishers in the general classification and to the top five finishers in each stage. The 238 points accrued by Chris Froome moved him up to second in the individual ranking, behind Alejandro Valverde. Despite Movistar Team's strong showing, Team Sky took over the lead of the team ranking due to Froome's points. With three riders in the top ten, Spain remained the leaders of the nation ranking.

UCI World Tour individual ranking on 26 July 2015 (1–10)
Rank	Prev.	Name	Team	Points
1	1	Alejandro Valverde (ESP)	Movistar Team	482
2	16	Chris Froome (GBR)	Team Sky	422
3	2	Alberto Contador (ESP)	Tinkoff–Saxo	407
4	15	Nairo Quintana (COL)	Movistar Team	365
5	3	Richie Porte (AUS)	Team Sky	314
6	7	Joaquim Rodríguez (ESP)	Team Katusha	292
7	6	Geraint Thomas (GBR)	Team Sky	283
8	4	Rui Costa (POR)	Lampre–Merida	275
9	5	Simon Špilak (SLO)	Team Katusha	269
10	9	John Degenkolb (GER)	Team Giant–Alpecin	265

== See also ==
- 2015 in men's road cycling
- 2015 in sports
- 2015 La Course by Le Tour de France

== Bibliography ==
- Liggett, Phil; Raia, James; Lewis, Sammarye (2005). Tour de France for Dummies. For Dummies. Indianapolis: John Wiley & Sons. ISBN 978-0-7645-8449-7.
- Race regulations (PDF). Paris: Amaury Sport Organisation. 2015. Archived from the original (PDF) on 24 June 2015.
- UCI cycling regulations (PDF). Part 2, road races. Aigle, Switzerland: Union Cycliste Internationale. 19 June 2015. Archived from the original (PDF) on 2 July 2015.
