= Cameron Wurf =

Australian rower, road cyclist, and triathlete

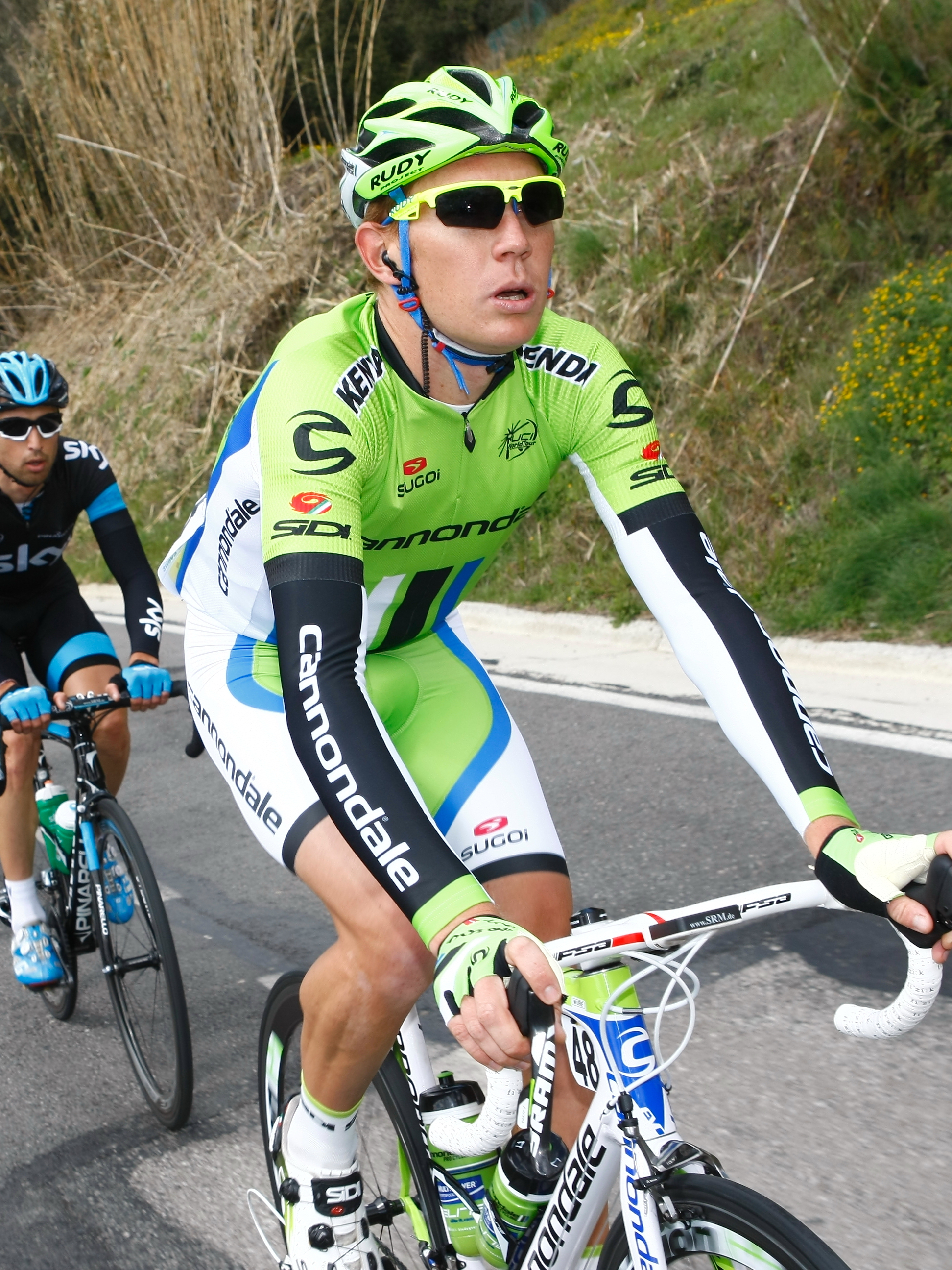
- Wurf at the 2013 Giro d'Italia

Personal information
- Full name: Cameron Wurf
- Born: 3 August 1983 (age 43) Sandy Bay, Tasmania, Australia
- Height: 1.71 m (5 ft 7 1/2 in)
- Weight: 71 kg (157 lb)

Cycling career
- Sport: Cycling
- Discipline: Road
- Role: Rider

Amateur teams
- 2007: Priority Health–Bissell
- 2008: Cinelli–OPD

Professional teams
- 2008: Team Volksbank
- 2009: Fuji–Servetto
- 2010: Androni Giocattoli
- 2011: Liquigas–Cannondale
- 2012: Champion System
- 2013–2014: Cannondale
- 2017: Cylance Pro Cycling
- 2020–2024: Team INEOS
Medal record
Men's rowing
Representing Australia
World Rowing U23 Championships
Gold medal – first place	2003 Belgrade	LM4-

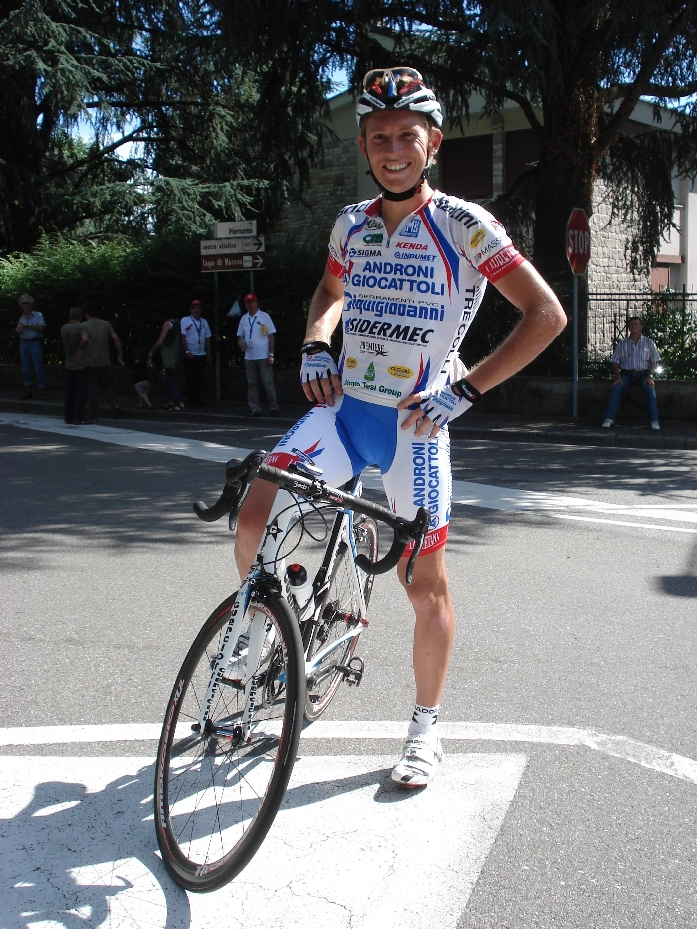
Cameron Wurf at the 2010 Tre Valli Varesine

Cameron Wurf (born 3 August 1983) is an Australian professional triathlete and road cyclist, who last rode for UCI WorldTeam INEOS Grenadiers. He was a national champion and Australian representative rower – a 2004 Olympian who won a World Rowing U23 Championships title in 2003.

== Career ==
=== Rowing ===
Born in Hobart, Wurf was educated at Hutchins School, Hobart where he took up rowing. He won the national Schoolboy Sculling title at the Australian Rowing Championships in 2001.

Aged eighteen Wurf first represented Australia in a coxless four at the 2001 Junior World Rowing Championships in Duisburg, Germany where the Australian four placed seventh. Then at the 2003 World Rowing U23 Championships in Belgrade he rowed in the lightweight coxless four to a gold medal victory.

From 2004 to 2006 Wurf was selected to represent Tasmania in the men's lightweight four contesting the Penrith Cup at the Interstate Regatta within the Australian Rowing Championships. All three of those Tasmanian crews were victorious

At the 2004 Athens Olympics Wurf contested the men's lightweight double scull and finished with a sixteenth placing. He continued to represent Australia at the highest level in rowing until 2006 competing at World Championships. At Gifu 2005 he raced the lightweight double scull to a twelfth place and at Eton Dorney 2006 he stroked a coxless pair to a fourth place in the final. It was Wurf's last representative rowing appearance.

=== Cycling ===
Wurf left the Champion System team at the end of the 2012 season – having joined the squad at the start of the season – and joined Cannondale for the 2013 season.

In February 2015, after finishing third in the time trial at the 2015 Oceania Road Championships, Wurf announced that he would take a year out from his professional cycling career, explaining that he felt he had not found his niche in the sport.

=== Triathlon ===
During his time off Wurf competed in triathlon, finishing ninth overall and winning the 30–34 age group on his Ironman debut at Whistler in July 2015.

Wurf made his professional triathlon debut at the Ironman Asia-Pacific Championships in Cairns in June 2016. In December 2016 he announced he would race for Cylance Pro Cycling in the 2017 season, combining bike racing with Ironman competitions. However, he only contested the Australian National Road Race Championships for the team.

In 2022, it was announced that Wurf would make his Super League Triathlon debut at SLT Malibu. Wurf finished 18th in the event, after being eliminated in stage 1, however has expressed interest in returning to Super League Triathlon in the future.

=== Return to cycling ===
On 31 January 2020, Wurf signed with Team INEOS to fill the vacancy left by the recently retired Vasil Kiryienka.

By 2024, he was the oldest rider on the WorldTour circuit. Because of his commitment to competing for Ineos, he competed in fewer Ironmans in 2024, but did compete in the Ironman World Championships, where he placed seventh.

== Major results ==
2007
1st Time trial, Oceania Games
1st Chrono Champenois
9th Overall Herald Sun Tour
2011
5th Overall Tour of Turkey
2012
2nd Overall Tour of Qinghai Lake
4th Overall Tour of China II
7th Overall Tour of Japan
2014
2nd Overall Herald Sun Tour
8th Overall Tour de Taiwan
2015
Oceania Road Championships

3rd Time trial
6th Road race

=== Grand Tour general classification results timeline ===
Grand Tour	2010	2011	2012	2013	2014	2015	2016	2017	2018	2019	2020
Giro d'Italia	77	—	—	128	—	—	—	—	—	—	—
Tour de France	Has not contested during his career										
Vuelta a España	—	—	—	99	—	—	—	—	—	—	95

Legend
—	Did not compete
DNF	Did not finish
