= Arturo Mora =

Spanish former road cyclist (born 1987)

Personal information
- Full name: Arturo Mora Ortiz
- Born: 24 March 1987 (age 39) Fuente el Fresno, Spain

Cycling career
- Sport: Cycling
- Current team: Retired
- Discipline: Road
- Role: Rider

Amateur teams
- 2009: Cueva El Soplao
- 2012–2013: Diputación de León–Arte en Transfer

Professional team
- 2010–2011: Caja Rural

Arturo Mora Ortiz (born 24 March 1987) is a Spanish former road cyclist, who rode professionally from 2010 to 2011 for Caja Rural.

== Major results ==
2003
1st Road race, National Novice Road Championships
2005
1st Road race, National Junior Road Championships
2007
1st Overall Vuelta a Palencia

1st Stage 3

2008
1st Overall Vuelta a Palencia

1st Stage 5

2009
1st Stage 3 Tour of Galicia
3rd Time trial, National Under-23 Road Championships
2010
1st Stage 1 Vuelta Ciclista a León
2011
1st Turkish Beauties classification, Tour of Turkey
