= 2011 Tour of Turkey =

Race details
- Dates: 24 April–1 May 2011
- Stages: 8
- Distance: 1,363.5 km (847.2 mi)
- Winning time: 33h 45' 48"

Results
Jersey awarded to the overall winner	Winner	Alexander Efimkin (RUS)	(Team Type 1–Sanofi Aventis)
	Second	Andrey Zeits (KAZ)	(Astana)
	Third	Thibaut Pinot (FRA)	(FDJ)
Jersey awarded to the points classification winner	Points	Alessandro Petacchi (ITA)	(Lampre–ISD)
Jersey awarded to the mountains classification winner	Mountains	Luis Felipe Laverde (COL)	(Colombia es Pasión–Café de Colombia)
Jersey awarded to the sprints classification winner	Sprints	Arturo Mora (ESP)	(Caja Rural)
	Team	FDJ	

The 2011 Tour of Turkey is the 47th edition of the Presidential Cycling Tour of Turkey cycling stage race. It is being held from 24 April–1 May 2011, and is rated as a 2.HC event on the UCI Europe Tour. The last edition was won by ISD–NERI's rider Giovanni Visconti. Also Turkish 2 cycling teams, Manisaspor and Konya Şekerspor debuted in this race.

== Teams and cyclists ==
There were 22 teams in the 2011 Tour of Turkey. Among them were 6 UCI ProTeams, 14 UCI Professional Continental teams, and 2 Continental teams. Each team was allowed eight riders on their squad, giving the event a peloton of 176 cyclists at its outset. The biggest names which compete here are Tyler Farrar, André Greipel, Alessandro Petacchi and Sandy Casar.

== Stages ==
=== Stage 1 ===
24 April 2011 – Istanbul, 114.1 km (70.9 mi)

Stage 1 Results
	Cyclist	Team	Time
1	Andrea Guardini (ITA)	Farnese Vini–Neri Sottoli	2h 35' 54"
2	Tyler Farrar (USA)	Garmin–Cervélo	+ 0"
3	Kenny van Hummel (NED)	Skil–Shimano	+ 0"
4	Manuel Belletti (ITA)	Colnago–CSF Inox	+ 0"
5	Roberto Ferrari (ITA)	Androni Giocattoli	+ 0"
6	Stefan van Dijk (NED)	Veranda's Willems–Accent	+ 0"
7	Nacer Bouhanni (FRA)	FDJ	+ 0"
8	Alessandro Petacchi (ITA)	Lampre–ISD	+ 0"
9	Juan José Lobato (ESP)	Andalucía–Caja Granada	+ 0"
10	Diego Milán (ESP)	Caja Rural	+ 0"

General Classification after Stage 1
	Cyclist	Team	Time
1	Andrea Guardini (ITA)	Farnese Vini–Neri Sottoli	2h 35' 54"
2	Tyler Farrar (USA)	Garmin–Cervélo	+ 4"
3	Kenny van Hummel (NED)	Skil–Shimano	+ 6"
4	Manuel Belletti (ITA)	Colnago–CSF Inox	+ 10"
5	Roberto Ferrari (ITA)	Androni Giocattoli	+ 10"
6	Stefan van Dijk (NED)	Veranda's Willems–Accent	+ 10"
7	Nacer Bouhanni (FRA)	FDJ	+ 10"
8	Alessandro Petacchi (ITA)	Lampre–ISD	+ 10"
9	Juan José Lobato (ESP)	Andalucía–Caja Granada	+ 10"
10	Diego Milán (ESP)	Caja Rural	+ 10"

=== Stage 2 ===
25 April 2011 – Kuşadası to Turgutreis, 178 km (110.6 mi)

Stage 2 results
	Cyclist	Team	Time
1	Valentin Iglinskiy (KAZ)	Astana	4h 23' 38"
2	Alessandro Petacchi (ITA)	Lampre–ISD	+ 0"
3	Elia Favilli (ITA)	Farnese Vini–Neri Sottoli	+ 0"
4	Juan Pablo Forero (COL)	Colombia es Pasión–Café de Colombia	+ 0"
5	Stefan van Dijk (NED)	Veranda's Willems–Accent	+ 0"
6	Tyler Farrar (USA)	Garmin–Cervélo	+ 0"
7	Jarosław Marycz (POL)	Saxo Bank–SunGard	+ 0"
8	Miraç Kal (TUR)	Konya–Şekerspor–Torku–Vivelo	+ 0"
9	Giorgio Brambilla (ITA)	De Rosa–Ceramica Flaminia	+ 0"
10	Andrea Grendene (ITA)	Team Type 1–Sanofi Aventis	+ 0"

General Classification after Stage 2
	Cyclist	Team	Time
1	Valentin Iglinskiy (KAZ)	Astana	6h 59' 12"
2	Tyler Farrar (USA)	Garmin–Cervélo	+ 4"
3	Kenny van Hummel (NED)	Skil–Shimano	+ 6"
4	Elia Favilli (ITA)	Farnese Vini–Neri Sottoli	+ 6"
5	Stefan van Dijk (NED)	Veranda's Willems–Accent	+ 10"
6	Manuel Belletti (ITA)	Colnago–CSF Inox	+ 10"
7	Mirac Kal (TUR)	Konya–Şekerspor–Torku–Vivelo	+ 10"
8	Diego Milán (ESP)	Caja Rural	+ 10"
9	Andrea Grendene (ITA)	Team Type 1–Sanofi Aventis	+ 10"
10	Jacopo Guarnieri (ITA)	Liquigas–Cannondale	+ 10"

=== Stage 3 ===
26 April 2011 – Bodrum to Marmaris, 166 km (103.1 mi)

Stage 3 results
	Cyclist	Team	Time
1	Manuel Belletti (ITA)	Colnago–CSF Inox	4h 22' 24"
2	Roberto Ferrari (ITA)	Androni Giocattoli	+ 0"
3	Wesley Sulzberger (AUS)	FDJ	+ 0"
4	Alessandro Petacchi (ITA)	Lampre–ISD	+ 0"
5	Ramūnas Navardauskas (LIT)	Garmin–Cervélo	+ 0"
6	Stefan van Dijk (NED)	Veranda's Willems–Accent	+ 0"
7	Diego Milán (ESP)	Caja Rural	+ 0"
8	Daniele Callegarin (ITA)	Team Type 1–Sanofi Aventis	+ 0"
9	André Greipel (GER)	Omega Pharma–Lotto	+ 0"
10	Nacer Bouhanni (FRA)	FDJ	+ 0"

General Classification after Stage 3
	Cyclist	Team	Time
1	Manuel Belletti (ITA)	Colnago–CSF Inox	11h 21' 36"
2	Roberto Ferrari (ITA)	Androni Giocattoli	+ 4"
3	Wesley Sulzberger (AUS)	FDJ	+ 6"
4	Stefan van Dijk (NED)	Veranda's Willems–Accent	+ 10"
5	Diego Milán (ESP)	Caja Rural	+ 10"
6	Julien Fouchard (FRA)	Cofidis	+ 10"
7	Riccardo Chiarini (ITA)	Androni Giocattoli	+ 10"
8	Andi Bajc (SLO)	Manisaspor Cycling Team	+ 10"
9	Egoitz García (ESP)	Caja Rural	+ 10"
10	Daniele Callegarin (ITA)	Team Type 1–Sanofi Aventis	+ 10"

=== Stage 4 ===
27 April 2011 – Marmaris to Pamukkale, 207 km (128.6 mi)

Stage 4 results
	Cyclist	Team	Time
1	Alessandro Petacchi (ITA)	Lampre–ISD	5h 36' 26"
2	Bartosz Huzarski (POL)	Team NetApp	+ 0"
3	Alexander Efimkin (RUS)	Team Type 1–Sanofi Aventis	+ 1"
4	Ramūnas Navardauskas (LIT)	Garmin–Cervélo	+ 1"
5	Rubens Bertogliati (SWI)	Team Type 1–Sanofi Aventis	+ 1"
6	Egoitz García (ESP)	Caja Rural	+ 1"
7	Riccardo Chiarini (ITA)	Androni Giocattoli	+ 1"
8	Nicolas Edet (FRA)	Cofidis	+ 1"
9	Wesley Sulzberger (AUS)	FDJ	+ 1"
10	Adam Hansen (AUS)	Omega Pharma–Lotto	+ 1"

General Classification after Stage 4
	Cyclist	Team	Time
1	Bartosz Huzarski (POL)	Team NetApp	16h 58' 06"
2	Wesley Sulzberger (AUS)	FDJ	+ 3"
3	Riccardo Chiarini (ITA)	Androni Giocattoli	+ 7"
4	Egoitz García (ESP)	Caja Rural	+ 7"
5	Jesús Del Nero (ESP)	Team NetApp	+ 7"
6	Anthony Roux (FRA)	FDJ	+ 7"
7	Ramūnas Navardauskas (LIT)	Garmin–Cervélo	+ 7"
8	Danail Petrov (BUL)	Konya–Şekerspor–Torku–Vivelo	+ 7"
9	Romain Zingle (BEL)	Cofidis	+ 7"
10	Nicolas Edet (FRA)	Cofidis	+ 7"

=== Stage 5 ===
28 April 2011 – Denizli to Fethiye, 218.6 km (135.8 mi)

Stage 5 results
	Cyclist	Team	Time
1	Matteo Rabottini (ITA)	Farnese Vini–Neri Sottoli	5h 51' 25"
2	Alexander Efimkin (RUS)	Team Type 1–Sanofi Aventis	+ 0"
3	Enrico Magazzini (ITA)	Lampre–ISD	+ 3"
4	Tom Peterson (USA)	Garmin–Cervélo	+ 3"
5	Thibaut Pinot (FRA)	FDJ	+ 3"
6	Lucas Euser (USA)	SpiderTech–C10	+ 3"
7	Cameron Wurf (AUS)	Liquigas–Cannondale	+ 3"
8	Ronan van Zandbeek (NED)	Skil–Shimano	+ 3"
9	Andrey Zeits (KAZ)	Astana	+ 14"
10	Eloy Ruiz (ESP)	Andalucía–Caja Granada	+ 25"

General Classification after Stage 5
	Cyclist	Team	Time
1	Tom Peterson (USA)	Garmin–Cervélo	22h 49' 41"
2	Cameron Wurf (AUS)	Liquigas–Cannondale	+ 27"
3	Alexander Efimkin (RUS)	Team Type 1–Sanofi Aventis	+ 29"
4	Andrey Zeits (KAZ)	Astana	+ 1' 42"
5	Thibaut Pinot (FRA)	FDJ	+ 2' 02"
6	Bartosz Huzarski (POL)	Team NetApp	+ 11' 45"
7	Wesley Sulzberger (AUS)	FDJ	+ 11' 48"
8	Riccardo Chiarini (ITA)	Androni Giocattoli	+ 11' 52"
9	Egoitz García (ESP)	Caja Rural	+ 11' 52"
10	Jesús Del Nero (ESP)	Team NetApp	+ 11' 52"

=== Stage 6 ===
29 April 2011 – Fethiye to Finike, 184 km (114.3 mi)

Stage 6 results
	Cyclist	Team	Time
1	André Greipel (GER)	Omega Pharma–Lotto	4h 27' 02"
2	Egoitz García (ESP)	Caja Rural	+ 0"
3	Bartosz Huzarski (POL)	Team NetApp	+ 0"
4	Francis Mourey (FRA)	FDJ	+ 0"
5	Jonas Aaen Jørgensen (DEN)	Saxo Bank–SunGard	+ 0"
6	Nicolas Edet (FRA)	Cofidis	+ 0"
7	Andrea Noè (ITA)	Farnese Vini–Neri Sottoli	+ 0"
8	Leopold König (CZE)	Team NetApp	+ 0"
9	Riccardo Chiarini (ITA)	Androni Giocattoli	+ 0"
10	Alexander Efimkin (RUS)	Team Type 1–Sanofi Aventis	+ 0"

General Classification after Stage 6
	Cyclist	Team	Time
1	Alexander Efimkin (RUS)	Team Type 1–Sanofi Aventis	27h 17' 12"
2	Andrey Zeits (KAZ)	Astana	+ 1' 13"
3	Thibaut Pinot (FRA)	FDJ	+ 1' 33"
4	Tom Peterson (USA)	Garmin–Cervélo	+ 1' 50"
5	Cameron Wurf (AUS)	Liquigas–Cannondale	+ 2' 17"
6	Bartosz Huzarski (POL)	Team NetApp	+ 11' 12"
7	Egoitz García (ESP)	Caja Rural	+ 11' 17"
8	Wesley Sulzberger (AUS)	FDJ	+ 11' 19"
9	Riccardo Chiarini (ITA)	Androni Giocattoli	+ 11' 23"
10	Nicolas Edet (FRA)	Cofidis	+ 11' 23"

=== Stage 7 ===
30 April 2011 – Tekirova to Manavgat, 138 km (85.7 mi)

Stage 7 results
	Cyclist	Team	Time
1	Andrea Guardini (ITA)	Farnese Vini–Neri Sottoli	3h 05' 37"
2	Kenny van Hummel (NED)	Skil–Shimano	+ 0"
3	Tyler Farrar (USA)	Garmin–Cervélo	+ 0"
4	André Greipel (GER)	Omega Pharma–Lotto	+ 0"
5	Alessandro Petacchi (ITA)	Lampre–ISD	+ 0"
6	Lucas Sebastián Haedo (ARG)	Saxo Bank–SunGard	+ 0"
7	Stefan Van Dijck (NED)	Veranda's Willems–Accent	+ 0"
8	Nacer Bouhanni (FRA)	FDJ	+ 0"
9	Sacha Modolo (ITA)	Colnago–CSF Inox	+ 0"
10	Allan Davis (AUS)	Astana	+ 0"

General Classification after Stage 7
	Cyclist	Team	Time
1	Alexander Efimkin (RUS)	Team Type 1–Sanofi Aventis	30h 22' 49"
2	Andrey Zeits (KAZ)	Astana	+ 1' 13"
3	Thibaut Pinot (FRA)	FDJ	+ 1' 33"
4	Tom Peterson (USA)	Garmin–Cervélo	+ 1' 50"
5	Cameron Wurf (AUS)	Liquigas–Cannondale	+ 2' 17"
6	Bartosz Huzarski (POL)	Team NetApp	+ 11' 12"
7	Egoitz García (ESP)	Caja Rural	+ 11' 17"
8	Wesley Sulzberger (AUS)	FDJ	+ 11' 19"
9	Riccardo Chiarini (ITA)	Androni Giocattoli	+ 11' 23"
10	Nicolas Edet (FRA)	Cofidis	+ 11' 23"

=== Stage 8 ===
1 May 2011 – Side to Alanya, 157.8 km (98.1 mi)

Stage 8 results
	Cyclist	Team	Time
1	Kenny van Hummel (NED)	Skil–Shimano	3h 22' 59"
2	André Greipel (GER)	Omega Pharma–Lotto	+ 0"
3	Alessandro Petacchi (ITA)	Lampre–ISD	+ 0"
4	Tyler Farrar (USA)	Garmin–Cervélo	+ 0"
5	Juan Pablo Forero (COL)	Colombia es Pasión–Café de Colombia	+ 0"
6	Allan Davis (AUS)	Astana	+ 0"
7	Stefan Van Dijck (NED)	Veranda's Willems–Accent	+ 0"
8	Giorgio Brambilla (ITA)	De Rosa–Ceramica Flaminia	+ 0"
9	Tom Veelers (NED)	Skil–Shimano	+ 0"
10	Diego Milán (ESP)	Caja Rural	+ 0"

General Classification after Stage 8
	Cyclist	Team	Time
1	Alexander Efimkin (RUS)	Team Type 1–Sanofi Aventis	33h 45' 48"
2	Andrey Zeits (KAZ)	Astana	+ 1' 13"
3	Thibaut Pinot (FRA)	FDJ	+ 1' 33"
4	Tom Peterson (USA)	Garmin–Cervélo	+ 1' 50"
5	Cameron Wurf (AUS)	Liquigas–Cannondale	+ 2' 17"
6	Bartosz Huzarski (POL)	Team NetApp	+ 11' 12"
7	Egoitz García (ESP)	Caja Rural	+ 11' 17"
8	Wesley Sulzberger (AUS)	FDJ	+ 11' 19"
9	Riccardo Chiarini (ITA)	Androni Giocattoli	+ 11' 23"
10	Nicolas Edet (FRA)	Cofidis	+ 11' 23"

== Classification leadership ==
Stage	Winner	General Classification	Points Classification	Mountains Classification	Turkish Beauties Classification	Team Classification
1	Andrea Guardini	Andrea Guardini	Andrea Guardini	not awarded	Arturo Mora	De Rosa–Stac Plastic
2	Valentin Iglinskiy	Valentin Iglinskiy	Tyler Farrar	Juan Pablo Villegas	Arturo Mora	Caja Rural
3	Manuel Belletti	Manuel Belletti	Manuel Belletti	Luis Felipe Laverde	Arturo Mora	FDJ
4	Alessandro Petacchi	Bartosz Huzarski	Alessandro Petacchi	Luis Felipe Laverde	Alessandro Petacchi	FDJ
5	Matteo Rabottini	Tom Peterson	Alessandro Petacchi	Alexander Efimkin	Alessandro Petacchi	FDJ
6	André Greipel	Alexander Efimkin	Alessandro Petacchi	Luis Felipe Laverde	Arturo Mora	FDJ
7	Andrea Guardini	Alexander Efimkin	Alessandro Petacchi	Luis Felipe Laverde	Arturo Mora	FDJ
8	Kenny van Hummel	Alexander Efimkin	Alessandro Petacchi	Luis Felipe Laverde	Arturo Mora	FDJ
Final		Alexander Efimkin	Alessandro Petacchi	Luis Felipe Laverde	Arturo Mora	FDJ
