= Bartosz Huzarski =

Polish road bicycle racer

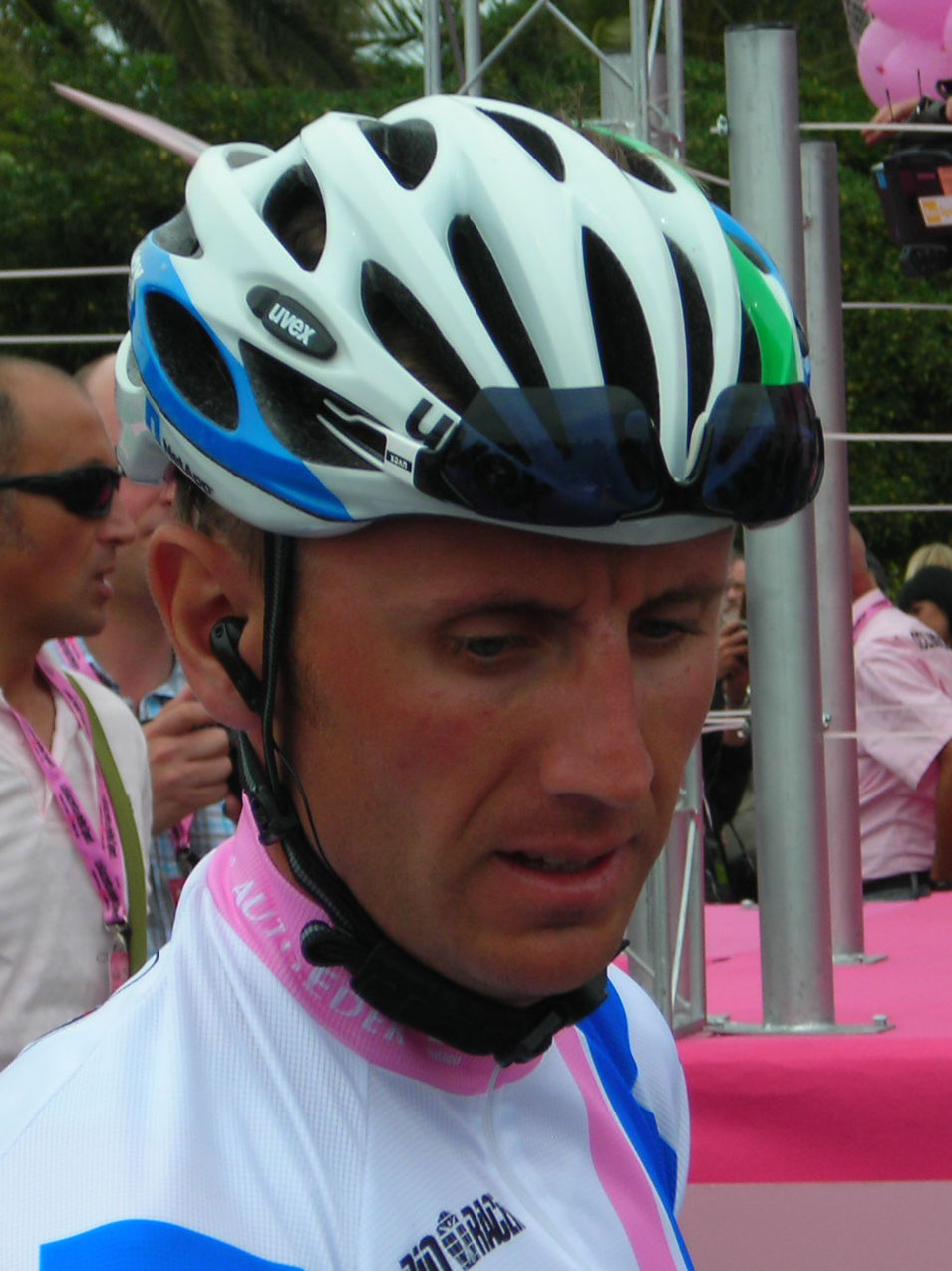
- Huzarski at the 2012 Giro d'Italia

Personal information
- Full name: Bartosz Huzarski
- Nickname: Huzar
- Born: 27 October 1980 (age 45) Świdnica, Poland
- Height: 1.83 m (6 ft 0 in)
- Weight: 69 kg (152 lb)

Cycling career
- Sport: Cycling
- Current team: Retired
- Discipline: Road
- Role: Rider
- Rider type: All-rounder

Professional teams
- 2002–2008: Mróz–Supradyn Witaminy
- 2009–2010: ISD
- 2011–2016: Team NetApp

Bartosz Huzarski (born 27 October 1980) is a Polish former professional road bicycle racer, who competed professionally between 2002 and 2016 for the Mróz–Action–UNIQA, ISD–NERI and Bora–Argon 18 teams. During his professional career, Huzarski took six victories, including the overall victory at the 2008 Szlakiem Grodów Piastowskich.

== Major results ==
2003
Peace Race

1st Young rider classification
1st Stage 7

2nd Overall Tour of Małopolska
2005
1st Mountains classification, Tour de Pologne
2nd Overall Tour of Małopolska
2nd Time trial, National Road Championships
6th Overall Bałtyk–Karkonosze Tour

1st Stage 6

8th Rund um die Hainleite
10th Overall Giro del Capo
2006
1st Mountains classification, Tour de Pologne
5th Overall Szlakiem Grodów Piastowskich
8th Szlakiem Walk Majora Hubala
2007
3rd Overall Szlakiem Grodów Piastowskich
8th Overall Tour du Poitou Charentes et de la Vienne
10th Coupe des Carpathes
2008
1st Overall Szlakiem Grodów Piastowskich

1st Stage 1

1st GP Dzierzoniowa
1st Szosami Zagłębia
2009
2nd Time trial, National Road Championships
6th Overall Course de Solidarność et des Champions Olympiques
2010
1st Stage 5 Settimana Internazionale di Coppi e Bartali
1st Stage 1 Settimana Ciclistica Lombarda
2nd Overall Szlakiem Grodów Piastowskich
5th Overall Brixia Tour

1st Stage 1 (TTT)

9th Gran Premio Nobili Rubinetterie
2011
6th Overall Tour of Turkey
7th Overall Tour de Pologne
2012
2nd Overall Settimana Internazionale di Coppi e Bartali

1st Stage 2b (TTT)

2nd Overall Course de Solidarność et des Champions Olympiques

1st Stage 5

5th Overall Tour of Britain
8th Druivenkoers Overijse
9th Overall Vuelta a Murcia
2013
1st Sprints classification, Tour de Pologne
5th Overall Szlakiem Grodów Piastowskich
2014
7th Overall USA Pro Cycling Challenge
2015
1st Stage 1 (TTT) Giro del Trentino
3rd Time trial, National Road Championships
Combativity award Stage 8 Tour de France

=== Grand Tour general classification results timeline ===
Grand Tour	2009	2010	2011	2012	2013	2014	2015	2016
Giro d'Italia	102	—	—	70	—	—	—	—
Tour de France	—	—	—	—	—	68	108	39
Vuelta a España	—	—	—	—	35	—	—	DNF

Legend
—	Did not compete
DNF	Did not finish
