= 2012 Vuelta a Murcia =

Race details
- Dates: 3–4 March 2012
- Stages: 2
- Distance: 205.1 km (127.4 mi)
- Winning time: 5h 06' 10"

Results
	Winner	Nairo Quintana (COL)
	Second	Jonathan Tiernan-Locke (GBR)
	Third	Wout Poels (NED)

The 2012 Vuelta a Murcia was the 28th edition of the Vuelta a Murcia cycle race and was held on 3 March to 4 March 2012. The race started in Archena and finished in Murcia. The race was won by Nairo Quintana.

== General classification ==
Final general classification

Rank	Rider	Time
1	Nairo Quintana (COL)	5h 06' 10"
2	Jonathan Tiernan-Locke (GBR)	+ 6"
3	Wout Poels (NED)	+ 9"
4	Sergio Pardilla (ESP)	+ 15"
5	Jonathan Castroviejo (ESP)	+ 21"
6	Samuel Sánchez (ESP)	+ 22"
7	Johnny Hoogerland (NED)	+ 25"
8	Robert Gesink (NED)	+ 33"
9	Bartosz Huzarski (POL)	+ 47"
10	Paul Voss (GER)	+ 1' 24"
