= 2014 Baltic Chain Tour =

International cycling stage race

2014 UCI Europe Tour

Race details
- Dates: 20–24 August 2014
- Stages: 5
- Distance: 851.8 km (529.3 mi)
- Winning time: 18h 36' 54"

Results
Jersey awarded to the overall winner	Winner	Mathieu van der Poel (NED)	(BKCP–Powerplus)
	Second	Clemens Fankhauser (AUT)	(Tirol Cycling Team)
	Third	Mykhaylo Kononenko (UKR)	(Kolss Cycling Team)
Jersey awarded to the mountains classification winner	Mountains	Uladzimir Harakhavik (BLR)	(Belarus (national team))
Jersey awarded to the youth classification winner	Youth	Mathieu van der Poel (NED)	(BKCP–Powerplus)
Jersey awarded to the sprints classification winner	Sprints	Mathieu van der Poel (NED)	(BKCP–Powerplus)
	Team	Kolss Cycling Team	

The 2014 Baltic Chain Tour was the fourth modern edition of the Baltic Chain Tour road cycling race. It was held over a period of five days between 20 and 24 August 2014. The race was a part of the 2014 UCI Europe Tour with a race classification of 2.2. This year the tour coincided with the 25th anniversary of the Baltic Chain, a peaceful political demonstration that occurred on 23 August 1989, with approximately two million people joining their hands to form a human chain spanning over 600 kilometres (370 mi) across the three Baltic states.

== Teams ==
A total of 20 teams raced in the 2014 Baltic Chain Tour: 12 UCI Continental teams, 5 national teams and 3 amateur tams.

- Alpha Baltic–Unitymarathons.com
- BDC Marcpol
- Belarus (national team)
- BKCP–Powerplus
- CK Banská Bystrica
- EC St Etienne-Loire
- Estonia (national team)
- Experiment 23
- Team Frøy–Bianchi
- Germany (national team)
- Itera–Katusha
- Kolss Cycling Team
- Lithuania (national team)
- Rietumu–Delfin
- Russia (national team)
- SJK Viiking
- Team Stölting
- Tirol Cycling Team
- Top Team Cycling
- Vino 4ever

== Route ==
Stage characteristics and winners
Stage	Date	Course	Distance	Winner
1	20 August	Vilnius (Lithuania) to Panevėžys (Lithuania)	184.5 km (114.6 mi)	Mykhaylo Kononenko (UKR)
2	21 August	Riga (Latvia) to Sigulda (Latvia)	157.7 km (98.0 mi)	Ivan Balykin (RUS)
3	22 August	Valmiera (Latvia) to Pärnu (Estonia)	164.5 km (102.2 mi)	Mykhaylo Kononenko (UKR)
4	23 August	Pärnu (Estonia) to Viljandi (Estonia)	165.5 km (102.8 mi)	Mathieu van der Poel (NED)
5	24 August	Viljandi (Estonia) to Tallinn (Estonia)	179.6 km (111.6 mi)	Phil Bauhaus (GER)

== Stages ==
=== Stage 1 ===
20 August 2014 — Vilnius (Lithuania) to Panevėžys (Lithuania), 184.5 km (114.6 mi)

Stage 1 Result

	Rider	Team	Time
1	Mykhaylo Kononenko (UKR)	Kolss Cycling Team	3h 50' 55"
2	Mathieu van der Poel (NED)	BKCP–Powerplus	+ 4"
3	Clemens Fankhauser (AUT)	Tirol Cycling Team	+ 4"
4	Martin Laas (EST)	SJK Viiking	+ 17"
5	Jan Oelerich (GER)	Team Stölting	+ 17"
6	Andris Vosekalns (LAT)	Rietumu–Delfin	+ 17"
7	Oleksandr Polivoda (UKR)	Kolss Cycling Team	+ 17"
8	Andriy Vasylyuk (UKR)	Kolss Cycling Team	+ 17"
9	Piotr Kirpsza (POL)	BDC Marcpol	+ 17"
10	Māris Bogdanovičs (LAT)	Alpha Baltic–Unitymarathons.com	+ 17"

General Classification after Stage 1

	Rider	Team	Time
1	Mykhaylo Kononenko (UKR)	Kolss Cycling Team	3h 50' 45"
2	Clemens Fankhauser (AUT)	Tirol Cycling Team	+ 4"
3	Mathieu van der Poel (NED)	BKCP–Powerplus	+ 7"
4	Martin Laas (EST)	SJK Viiking	+ 22"
5	Andriy Vasylyuk (UKR)	Kolss Cycling Team	+ 22"
6	Māris Bogdanovičs (LAT)	Alpha Baltic–Unitymarathons.com	+ 26"
7	Jan Oelerich (GER)	Team Stölting	+ 27"
8	Andris Vosekalns (LAT)	Rietumu–Delfin	+ 27"
9	Oleksandr Polivoda (UKR)	Kolss Cycling Team	+ 27"
10	Piotr Kirpsza (POL)	BDC Marcpol	+ 27"

=== Stage 2 ===
21 August 2014 — Riga (Latvia) to Sigulda (Latvia), 157.7 km (98.0 mi)

Stage 2 Result

	Rider	Team	Time
1	Ivan Balykin (RUS)	Russia (national team)	3h 22' 56"
2	Martin Weiss (AUT)	Tirol Cycling Team	+ 0"
3	David van der Poel (NED)	BKCP–Powerplus	+ 9"
4	Maxim Pokidov (RUS)	Itera–Katusha	+ 9"
5	Trond Trondsen (NOR)	Team Frøy–Bianchi	+ 9"
6	Adam Stachowiak (POL)	BDC Marcpol	+ 9"
7	Krists Neilands (LAT)	Rietumu–Delfin	+ 9"
8	Clemens Fankhauser (AUT)	Tirol Cycling Team	+ 9"
9	Nikita Zharoven (BLR)	Belarus (national team)	+ 9"
10	Stepan Astafyev (KAZ)	Vino 4ever	+ 9"

General Classification after Stage 2

	Rider	Team	Time
1	Clemens Fankhauser (AUT)	Tirol Cycling Team	7h 13' 54"
2	Mykhaylo Kononenko (UKR)	Kolss Cycling Team	+ 0"
3	Mathieu van der Poel (NED)	BKCP–Powerplus	+ 3"
4	Māris Bogdanovičs (LAT)	Alpha Baltic–Unitymarathons.com	+ 22"
5	Martin Laas (EST)	SJK Viiking	+ 22"
6	Žydrūnas Savickas (LTU)	Lithuania (national team)	+ 23"
7	Maxim Pokidov (RUS)	Itera–Katusha	+ 26"
8	Jan Oelerich (GER)	Team Stölting	+ 27"
9	Andris Vosekalns (LAT)	Rietumu–Delfin	+ 27"
10	Piotr Kirpsza (POL)	BDC Marcpol	+ 27"

=== Stage 3 ===
22 August 2014 — Valmiera (Latvia) to Pärnu (Estonia), 164.5 km (102.2 mi)

Stage 3 Result

	Rider	Team	Time
1	Mykhaylo Kononenko (UKR)	Kolss Cycling Team	3h 46' 50"
2	Mamyr Stash (RUS)	Itera–Katusha	+ 0"
3	Mathieu van der Poel (NED)	BKCP–Powerplus	+ 0"
4	Oskar Nisu (EST)	Estonia (national team)	+ 0"
5	Clemens Fankhauser (AUT)	Tirol Cycling Team	+ 0"
6	Aidis Kruopis (LTU)	Lithuania (national team)	+ 0"
7	Igor Boev (RUS)	Russia (national team)	+ 0"
8	Aksel Nõmmela (EST)	Estonia (national team)	+ 0"
9	Daan Hoeyberghs (BEL)	BKCP–Powerplus	+ 0"
10	Wietse Bosmans (BEL)	BKCP–Powerplus	+ 0"

General Classification after Stage 3

	Rider	Team	Time
1	Mykhaylo Kononenko (UKR)	Kolss Cycling Team	11h 00' 33"
2	Clemens Fankhauser (AUT)	Tirol Cycling Team	+ 9"
3	Mathieu van der Poel (NED)	BKCP–Powerplus	+ 10"
4	Māris Bogdanovičs (LAT)	Alpha Baltic–Unitymarathons.com	+ 33"
5	Martin Laas (EST)	SJK Viiking	+ 33"
6	Žydrūnas Savickas (LTU)	Lithuania (national team)	+ 34"
7	Maxim Pokidov (RUS)	Itera–Katusha	+ 37"
8	Andris Vosekalns (LAT)	Rietumu–Delfin	+ 38"
9	Jan Oelerich (GER)	Team Stölting	+ 38"
10	Matvey Zubov (RUS)	Russia (national team)	+ 42"

=== Stage 4 ===
23 August 2014 — Pärnu (Estonia) to Viljandi (Estonia), 165.5 km (102.8 mi)

Stage 4 Result

	Rider	Team	Time
1	Mathieu van der Poel (NED)	BKCP–Powerplus	3h 47' 51"
2	Krists Neilands (LAT)	Rietumu–Delfin	+ 10"
3	Philipp Walsleben (GER)	BKCP–Powerplus	+ 10"
4	Clemens Fankhauser (AUT)	Tirol Cycling Team	+ 10"
5	Wietse Bosmans (BEL)	BKCP–Powerplus	+ 14"
6	Martin Laas (EST)	SJK Viiking	+ 14"
7	Jan Oelerich (GER)	Team Stölting	+ 14"
8	Maxim Pokidov (RUS)	Itera–Katusha	+ 14"
9	Žydrūnas Savickas (LTU)	Lithuania (national team)	+ 14"
10	Daan Hoeyberghs (BEL)	BKCP–Powerplus	+ 22"

General Classification after Stage 4

	Rider	Team	Time
1	Mathieu van der Poel (NED)	BKCP–Powerplus	14h 48' 23"
2	Clemens Fankhauser (AUT)	Tirol Cycling Team	+ 20"
3	Mykhaylo Kononenko (UKR)	Kolss Cycling Team	+ 35"
4	Martin Laas (EST)	SJK Viiking	+ 45"
5	Žydrūnas Savickas (LTU)	Lithuania (national team)	+ 49"
6	Maxim Pokidov (RUS)	Itera–Katusha	+ 52"
7	Jan Oelerich (GER)	Team Stölting	+ 53"
8	Māris Bogdanovičs (LAT)	Alpha Baltic–Unitymarathons.com	+ 1' 17"
9	Matvey Zubov (RUS)	Russia (national team)	+ 1' 17"
10	Andris Vosekalns (LAT)	Rietumu–Delfin	+ 1' 34"

=== Stage 5 ===
24 August 2014 — Viljandi (Estonia) to Tallinn (Estonia), 179.6 km (111.6 mi)

Stage 5 Result

	Rider	Team	Time
1	Phil Bauhaus (GER)	Team Stölting	3h 48' 35"
2	Aidis Kruopis (LTU)	Lithuania (national team)	+ 0"
3	Mathieu van der Poel (NED)	BKCP–Powerplus	+ 0"
4	Ivan Balykin (RUS)	Russia (national team)	+ 0"
5	Martin Laas (EST)	SJK Viiking	+ 0"
6	Krists Neilands (LAT)	Rietumu–Delfin	+ 0"
7	Oskar Nisu (EST)	Estonia (national team)	+ 0"
8	Trond Trondsen (NOR)	Team Frøy–Bianchi	+ 0"
9	Andris Smirnovs (LAT)	Rietumu–Delfin	+ 0"
10	Clemens Fankhauser (AUT)	Tirol Cycling Team	+ 0"

Final General Classification

	Rider	Team	Time
1	Mathieu van der Poel (NED)	BKCP–Powerplus	18h 36' 54"
2	Clemens Fankhauser (AUT)	Tirol Cycling Team	+ 24"
3	Mykhaylo Kononenko (UKR)	Kolss Cycling Team	+ 39"
4	Martin Laas (EST)	SJK Viiking	+ 49"
5	Maxim Pokidov (RUS)	Itera–Katusha	+ 56"
6	Jan Oelerich (GER)	Team Stölting	+ 57"
7	Žydrūnas Savickas (LTU)	Lithuania (national team)	+ 1' 19"
8	Matvey Zubov (RUS)	Russia (national team)	+ 1' 27"
9	Piotr Kirpsza (POL)	BDC Marcpol	+ 2' 11"
10	Andriy Vasylyuk (UKR)	Kolss Cycling Team	+ 2' 34"

== Classification leadership table ==
Stage	Winner	General classification	Sprints classification	Mountains classification	Young rider classification	Teams classification
1	Mykhaylo Kononenko	Mykhaylo Kononenko	Mykhaylo Kononenko	Not awarded	Mathieu van der Poel	Kolss Cycling Team
2	Ivan Balykin	Clemens Fankhauser	Ivan Balykin	Ivan Balykin	Mathieu van der Poel	Kolss Cycling Team
3	Mykhaylo Kononenko	Mykhaylo Kononenko	Mykhaylo Kononenko	Uladzimir Harakhavik	Mathieu van der Poel	Kolss Cycling Team
4	Mathieu van der Poel	Mathieu van der Poel	Mathieu van der Poel	Uladzimir Harakhavik	Mathieu van der Poel	Kolss Cycling Team
5	Phil Bauhaus	Mathieu van der Poel	Mathieu van der Poel	Uladzimir Harakhavik	Mathieu van der Poel	Kolss Cycling Team
Final		Mathieu van der Poel	Mathieu van der Poel	Uladzimir Harakhavik	Mathieu van der Poel	Kolss Cycling Team
