= 2013 Baltic Chain Tour =

International cycling stage race

2013 UCI Europe Tour

Race details
- Dates: 19—25 August 2013
- Stages: 6
- Distance: 1,019.3 km (633.4 mi)
- Winning time: 22h 29' 29"

Results
Jersey awarded to the overall winner	Winner	Philipp Walsleben (GER)	(BKCP–Powerplus)
	Second	Ivan Savitckii (RUS)	(National Team Russia)
	Third	Žydrūnas Savickas (LTU)	(National Team Lithuania)
Jersey awarded to the mountains classification winner	Mountains	Sergiy Grechyn (UKR)	(Torku Şekerspor)
Jersey awarded to the youth classification winner	Youth	Ivan Savitckii (RUS)	(National Team Russia)
Jersey awarded to the sprints classification winner	Sprints	Maximilian Beyer (GER)	(National Team Germany)
	Team	National Team Lithuania	

The 2013 Baltic Chain Tour was the third edition of the Baltic Chain Tour road cycling race. It was held over a period of six days between 19 and 25 May 2013. The race was a part of the 2013 UCI Europe Tour with a race classification of 2.2. General classification was won by German cyclist Philipp Walsleben of BKCP–Powerplus.

== Schedule ==
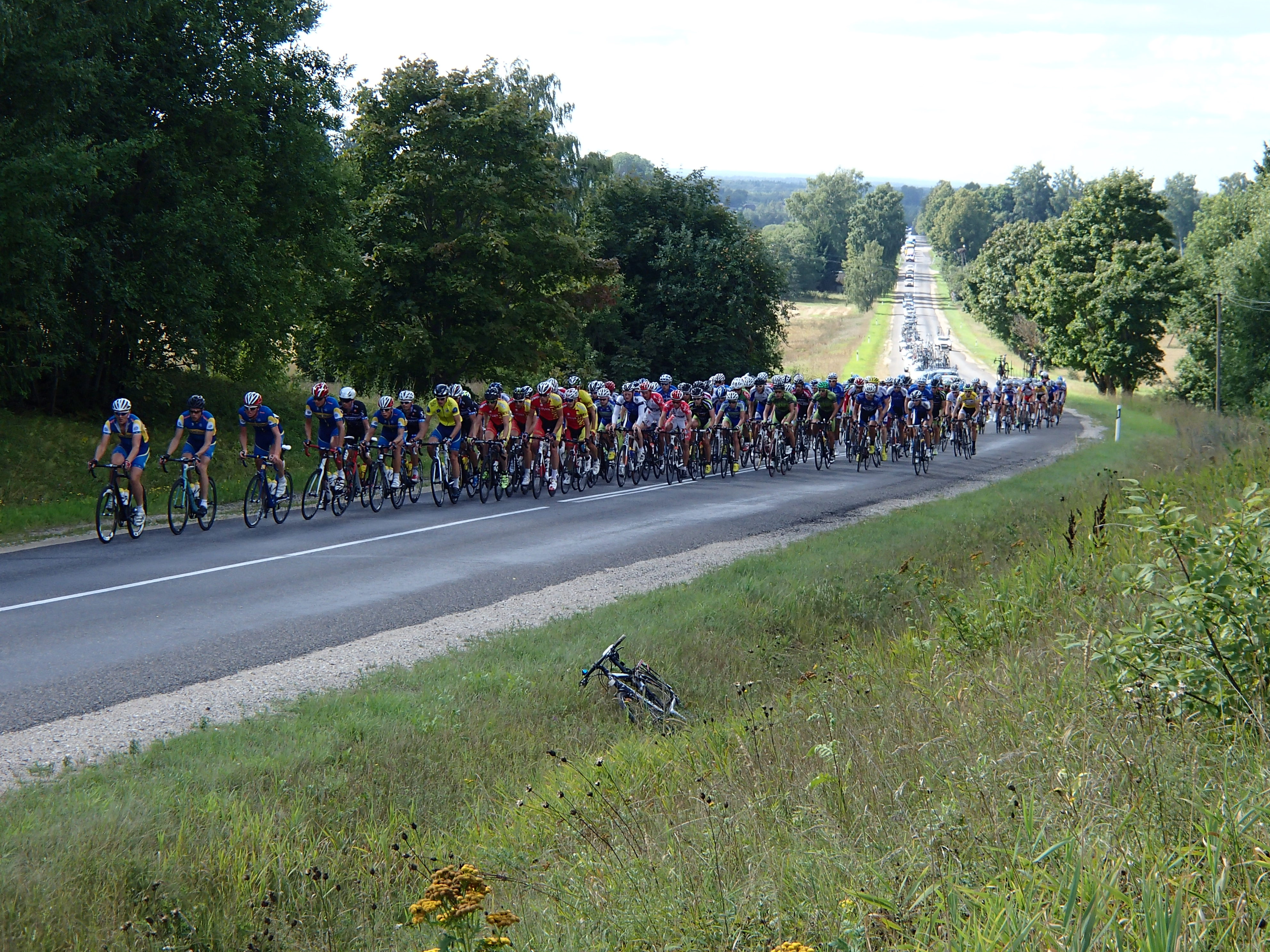
Stage 3, Viljandi-Otepää

Stage	Start	Finish	Distance	Date	Winner	Time
1	Lahti	Lahti	168.8 km	19 August	Philipp Walsleben (GER)	3h 42' 24"
2	Tallinn	Viljandi	193.9 km	20 August	Marcel Meisen (GER)	4h 22' 40"
3	Viljandi	Otepää	171.1 km	21 August	Andrey Sazanov (RUS)	3h 53' 12"
4	Smiltene	Sigulda	179.0 km	22 August	Patrik Tybor (SVK)	3h 52' 24"
5	Panevėžys	Utena	154.1 km	24 August	Mihkel Räim (EST)	3h 23' 18"
6	Utena	Vilnius	152.4 km	25 August	Andris Smirnovs (LAT)	3h 15' 10"

== Teams ==
UCI Continental Teams
- (Latvia) Alpha Baltic–Unitymarathons.com
- (Poland) BDC–Marcpol Team
- (Belgium) BKCP–Powerplus
- (Norway) Frøy-Bianchi
- (Ukraine) ISD Continental Team
- (Russia) Itera–Katusha
- (Ukraine) Kolss Cycling Team
- (Latvia) Rietumu–Delfin
- (Azerbaijan) Synergy Baku
- (Turkey) Torku Şekerspor
National Teams
- National Team Belarus
- National Team Estonia
- National Team Germany
- National Team Lithuania
- National Team Russia
- National Team Slovakia
- National Team Sweden
Elite Teams
- (Belarus) Bulbash
- (Estonia) Peloton
- (Estonia) SJK Viiking
- (Finland) TWD – Länken

== Stages ==
=== Stage 1 ===
19 August 2013 – Lahti, 168.8 km (104.9 mi)

Stage 1 Result

	Rider	Team	Time
1	Philipp Walsleben (GER)	BKCP–Powerplus	3h 42' 36"
2	Lucas Liss (GER)	National Team Germany	2"
3	Alo Jakin (EST)	Peloton	s.t.
4	Ivan Savitckii (RUS)	National Team Russia	s.t.
5	Marcus Faglum-Karlsson (SWE)	National Team Sweden	s.t.
6	Martynas Maniušis (LTU)	National Team Lithuania	s.t.
7	Damian Walczak (POL)	BDC–Marcpol Team	s.t.
8	Paavo Paajanen (FIN)	TWD – Länken	s.t.
9	Andriy Vasylyuk (UKR)	Kolss Cycling Team	s.t.
10	Žydrūnas Savickas (LTU)	National Team Lithuania	5"

General Classification after Stage 1

	Rider	Team	Time
1	Philipp Walsleben (GER)	BKCP–Powerplus	3h 42' 36"
2	Alo Jakin (EST)	Peloton	10"
3	Martynas Maniušis (LTU)	National Team Lithuania	13"
4	Andriy Vasylyuk (UKR)	Kolss Cycling Team	s.t.
5	Ivan Savitckii (RUS)	National Team Russia	14"
6	Marcus Faglum-Karlsson (SWE)	National Team Sweden	s.t.
7	Damian Walczak (POL)	BDC–Marcpol Team	s.t.
8	Paavo Paajanen (FIN)	TWD – Länken	s.t.
9	Žydrūnas Savickas (LTU)	National Team Lithuania	17"
10	Vitaliy Popkov (UKR)	ISD Continental Team	s.t.

=== Stage 2 ===
20 August 2013 – Tallinn to Viljandi, 193.9 km (120.5 mi)

Stage 2 Result

	Rider	Team	Time
1	Marcel Meisen (GER)	BKCP–Powerplus	4h 22' 40"
2	David Van Der Poel (NED)	BKCP–Powerplus	s.t.
3	Christian Bertilsson (SWE)	National Team Sweden	s.t.
4	Marcus Faglum-Karlsson (SWE)	National Team Sweden	s.t.
5	Mateusz Komar (POL)	BDC–Marcpol Team	s.t.
6	Paavo Paajanen (FIN)	TWD – Länken	s.t.
7	Marius Bernatonis (LTU)	National Team Lithuania	3"
8	Indulis Bekmanis (LAT)	Alpha Baltic–Unitymarathons.com	s.t.
9	Christoph Schweizer (GER)	Synergy Baku	s.t.
10	Martynas Maniušis (LTU)	National Team Lithuania	s.t.

General Classification after Stage 2

	Rider	Team	Time
1	Marcus Faglum-Karlsson (SWE)	National Team Sweden	8h 05' 16"
2	Paavo Paajanen (FIN)	TWD – Länken	s.t.
3	Mateusz Komar (POL)	BDC–Marcpol Team	s.t.
4	Martynas Maniušis (LTU)	National Team Lithuania	2"
5	Alo Jakin (EST)	Peloton	3"
6	Philipp Walsleben (GER)	BKCP–Powerplus	s.t.
7	Marcel Meisen (GER)	BKCP–Powerplus	5"
8	David Van Der Poel (NED)	BKCP–Powerplus	9"
9	Christian Bertilsson (SWE)	National Team Sweden	11"
10	Martin Laas (EST)	SJK Viiking	13"

=== Stage 3 ===
21 August 2013 – Viljandi to Otepää, 171.1 km (106.3 mi)

Stage 3 Result

	Rider	Team	Time
1	Andrey Sazanov (RUS)	National Team Russia	3h 53' 12"
2	Marcel Meisen (GER)	BKCP–Powerplus	s.t.
3	Martin Laas (EST)	SJK Viiking	s.t.
4	Emīls Liepiņš (LAT)	Alpha Baltic–Unitymarathons.com	s.t.
5	Philipp Walsleben (GER)	BKCP–Powerplus	s.t.
6	Siarhei Papok (BLR)	National Team Belarus	s.t.
7	Oleksandr Martynenko (UKR)	ISD Continental Team	s.t.
8	Jens Adams (BEL)	BKCP–Powerplus	s.t.
9	Maksym Vasyliev (UKR)	ISD Continental Team	s.t.
10	Christian Bertilsson (SWE)	National Team Sweden	s.t.

General Classification after Stage 3

	Rider	Team	Time
1	Marcel Meisen (GER)	BKCP–Powerplus	11h 58' 27"
2	Mateusz Komar (POL)	BDC–Marcpol Team	1"
3	Paavo Paajanen (FIN)	TWD – Länken	s.t.
4	Marcus Faglum-Karlsson (SWE)	National Team Sweden	s.t.
5	Martynas Maniušis (LTU)	National Team Lithuania	3"
6	Philipp Walsleben (GER)	BKCP–Powerplus	4"
7	Alo Jakin (EST)	Peloton	s.t.
8	David Van Der Poel (NED)	BKCP–Powerplus	10"
9	Martin Laas (EST)	SJK Viiking	s.t.
10	Christian Bertilsson (SWE)	National Team Sweden	12"

=== Stage 4 ===
22 August 2013 – Smiltene to Sigulda, 179.0 km (111.2 mi)

Stage 4 Result

	Rider	Team	Time
1	Patrik Tybor (SVK)	National Team Slovakia	3h 52' 24"
2	Ivan Savitckii (RUS)	National Team Russia	5"
3	Paavo Paajanen (FIN)	TWD – Länken	10"
4	Rene Mandri (EST)	Peloton	s.t.
5	Philipp Walsleben (GER)	BKCP–Powerplus	s.t.
6	Anatoliy Pakhtusov (UKR)	ISD Continental Team	s.t.
7	Andrey Mizurov (KAZ)	Torku Şekerspor	s.t.
8	Žydrūnas Savickas (LTU)	National Team Lithuania	s.t.
9	Sergiy Grechyn (UKR)	Torku Şekerspor	19"
10	Indulis Bekmanis (LAT)	Alpha Baltic–Unitymarathons.com	23"

General Classification after Stage 4

	Rider	Team	Time
1	Paavo Paajanen (FIN)	TWD – Länken	15h 50' 56"
2	Philipp Walsleben (GER)	BKCP–Powerplus	9"
3	Ivan Savitckii (RUS)	National Team Russia	10"
4	Patrik Tybor (SVK)	National Team Slovakia	26"
5	Žydrūnas Savickas (LTU)	National Team Lithuania	32"
6	Sergiy Grechyn (UKR)	Torku Şekerspor	33"
7	Indulis Bekmanis (LAT)	Alpha Baltic–Unitymarathons.com	37"
8	Rene Mandri (EST)	Peloton	44"
9	Anatoliy Pakhtusov (UKR)	ISD Continental Team	47"
10	Andrey Mizurov (KAZ)	Torku Şekerspor	s.t.

=== Stage 5 ===
24 August 2013 – Panevėžys to Utena, 154.1 km (95.8 mi)

Stage 5 Result

	Rider	Team	Time
1	Mihkel Räim (EST)	SJK Viiking	3h 23' 18"
2	Siarhei Papok (BLR)	National Team Belarus	s.t.
3	Maxim Pokidov (RUS)	Itera–Katusha	s.t.
4	Rene Mandri (EST)	Peloton	s.t.
5	Mateusz Komar (POL)	BDC–Marcpol Team	s.t.
6	Yuriy Metlushenko (UKR)	Torku Şekerspor	s.t.
7	Andriy Kulyk (UKR)	Kolss Cycling Team	s.t.
8	Indulis Bekmanis (LAT)	Alpha Baltic–Unitymarathons.com	s.t.
9	Philipp Walsleben (GER)	BKCP–Powerplus	s.t.
10	Maksym Vasyliev (UKR)	ISD Continental Team	s.t.

General Classification after Stage 5

	Rider	Team	Time
1	Philipp Walsleben (GER)	BKCP–Powerplus	19h 14' 22"
2	Ivan Savitckii (RUS)	National Team Russia	2"
3	Žydrūnas Savickas (LTU)	National Team Lithuania	22"
4	Indulis Bekmanis (LAT)	Alpha Baltic–Unitymarathons.com	29"
5	Rene Mandri (EST)	Peloton	36"
6	Anatoliy Pakhtusov (UKR)	ISD Continental Team	39"
7	Mateusz Komar (POL)	BDC–Marcpol Team	45"
8	Andriy Kulyk (UKR)	Kolss Cycling Team	58"
9	Branislau Samoilau (BLR)	National Team Belarus	1'01"
10	Andriy Vasylyuk (UKR)	Kolss Cycling Team	1'10"

=== Stage 6 ===
25 August 2013 – Utena to Vilnius, 152.4 km (94.7 mi)

Stage 6 Result

	Rider	Team	Time
1	Andris Smirnovs (LAT)	Rietumu–Delfin	3h 15' 10"
2	Emīls Liepiņš (LAT)	Alpha Baltic–Unitymarathons.com	s.t.
3	Yuriy Metlushenko (UKR)	Torku Şekerspor	s.t.
4	Alo Jakin (EST)	Peloton	s.t.
5	Tomas Vaitkus (LTU)	National Team Lithuania	s.t.
6	Ivan Savitckii (RUS)	National Team Russia	s.t.
7	Andriy Kulyk (UKR)	Kolss Cycling Team	s.t.
8	Erik Baška (SVK)	National Team Slovakia	s.t.
9	Maksym Vasyliev (UKR)	ISD Continental Team	s.t.
10	Christoph Schweizer (GER)	Synergy Baku	s.t.

General Classification after Stage 6

	Rider	Team	Time
1	Philipp Walsleben (GER)	BKCP–Powerplus	22h 29' 29"
2	Ivan Savitckii (RUS)	National Team Russia	2"
3	Žydrūnas Savickas (LTU)	National Team Lithuania	25"
4	Indulis Bekmanis (LAT)	Alpha Baltic–Unitymarathons.com	32"
5	Rene Mandri (EST)	Peloton	39"
6	Anatoliy Pakhtusov (UKR)	ISD Continental Team	42"
7	Mateusz Komar (POL)	BDC–Marcpol Team	48"
8	Andriy Kulyk (UKR)	Kolss Cycling Team	1'01"
9	Branislau Samoilau (BLR)	National Team Belarus	1'04"
10	Andriy Vasylyuk (UKR)	Kolss Cycling Team	1'13"

== Classification leadership table ==
Stage	Stage winner	General Classification	Sprint	King of the Mountains	Young riders classification (U26)	Team classification
1	Philipp Walsleben	Philipp Walsleben	Lucas Liss	Damian Walczak	Ivan Savitckii	BDC–Marcpol Team
2	Marcel Meisen	Marcus Faglum-Karlsson	Martin Laas	Damian Walczak	Marcus Faglum-Karlsson	BKCP–Powerplus
3	Andrey Sazanov	Marcel Meisen	Maximilian Beyer	Damian Walczak	Marcus Faglum-Karlsson	BKCP–Powerplus
4	Patrik Tybor	Paavo Paajanen	Maximilian Beyer	Sergiy Grechyn	Ivan Savitckii	BKCP–Powerplus
5	Mihkel Räim	Philipp Walsleben	Maximilian Beyer	Sergiy Grechyn	Ivan Savitckii	National Team Lithuania
6	Andris Smirnovs	Philipp Walsleben	Maximilian Beyer	Sergiy Grechyn	Ivan Savitckii	National Team Lithuania
Final		Philipp Walsleben	Maximilian Beyer	Sergiy Grechyn	Ivan Savitckii	National Team Lithuania

== Final standings ==
=== General classification ===
	Rider	Team	Time
1	Philipp Walsleben (GER)	BKCP–Powerplus	22h 29' 29"
2	Ivan Savitckii (RUS)	National Team Russia	2"
3	Žydrūnas Savickas (LTU)	National Team Lithuania	25"
4	Indulis Bekmanis (LAT)	Alpha Baltic–Unitymarathons.com	32"
5	Rene Mandri (EST)	Peloton	39"
6	Anatoliy Pakhtusov (UKR)	ISD Continental Team	42"
7	Mateusz Komar (POL)	BDC–Marcpol Team	48"
8	Andriy Kulyk (UKR)	Kolss Cycling Team	1'01"
9	Branislau Samoilau (BLR)	National Team Belarus	1'04"
10	Andriy Vasylyuk (UKR)	Kolss Cycling Team	1'13"

=== Sprint classification ===
	Rider	Team	Points
1	Maximilian Beyer (GER)	National Team Germany	11
2	Martin Laas (EST)	SJK Viiking	7
3	Philipp Walsleben (GER)	BKCP–Powerplus	6
4	Darijus Dzervus (LTU)	National Team Lithuania	6
5	Marcel Meisen (GER)	BKCP–Powerplus	3
6	Andris Smirnovs (LAT)	Rietumu–Delfin	3
7	Ivan Savitckii (RUS)	National Team Russia	3
8	Rene Mandri (EST)	Peloton	3
9	Maksym Vasyliev (UKR)	ISD Continental Team	3
10	Alexey Kurbatov (RUS)	National Team Russia	3

=== Mountains classification ===
	Rider	Team	Points
1	Sergiy Grechyn (UKR)	Torku Şekerspor	9
2	Vitaliy Popkov (UKR)	ISD Continental Team	8
3	Damian Walczak (POL)	BDC–Marcpol Team	5
4	Yuriy Metlushenko (UKR)	Torku Şekerspor	4
5	Philipp Walsleben (GER)	BKCP–Powerplus	2
6	Rene Mandri (EST)	Peloton	2
7	Mykhaylo Radionov (UKR)	Kolss Cycling Team	2
8	Mihkel Räim (EST)	SJK Viiking	2
9	Alo Jakin (EST)	Peloton	2
10	Žydrūnas Savickas (LTU)	National Team Lithuania	1

=== Young riders classification ===
	Rider	Team	Time
1	Ivan Savitckii (RUS)	National Team Russia	22h 29' 31"
2	Žydrūnas Savickas (LTU)	National Team Lithuania	23"
3	Adrian Banaszek (POL)	BDC–Marcpol Team	2'18"
4	Kirill Egorov (RUS)	Itera–Katusha	2'54"
5	Alexey Kurbatov (RUS)	National Team Russia	5'35"
6	Raman Ramanau (BLR)	Bulbash	5'50"
7	Mihkel Räim (EST)	SJK Viiking	6'04"
8	Aleksander Grigorev (RUS)	National Team Russia	7'43"
9	David Van Der Poel (NED)	BKCP–Powerplus	11'46"
10	Andris Vosekalns (LAT)	Rietumu–Delfin	11'49"

=== Team classification ===
	Team	Points
1	National Team Lithuania	67h 31' 21"
2	(Ukraine) Kolss Cycling Team	27"
3	(Ukraine) ISD Continental Team	55"
4	(Poland) BDC–Marcpol Team	4'23"
5	National Team Russia	5'10"
6	(Russia) Itera–Katusha	10'09"
7	(Belgium) BKCP–Powerplus	21'10"
8	(Turkey) Torku Şekerspor	21'27"
9	(Latvia) Alpha Baltic–Unitymarathons.com	22'07"
10	(Estonia) Peloton	23'07"
