= 2012 Baltic Chain Tour =

International cycling stage race

2012 UCI Europe Tour

Race details
- Dates: 21—25 August 2012
- Stages: 5
- Distance: 873.9 km (543.0 mi)
- Winning time: 19h 54' 25"

Results
Jersey awarded to the overall winner	Winner	Gediminas Bagdonas (LTU)	(National Team Lithuania)
	Second	Viktor Shmalko (RUS)	(Itera–Katusha)
	Third	Ian Wilkinson (GBR)	(Endura Racing)
Jersey awarded to the mountains classification winner	Mountains	Mihkel Räim (EST)	(SJK Viiking)
Jersey awarded to the youth classification winner	Youth	Viktor Shmalko (RUS)	(Itera–Katusha)
Jersey awarded to the sprints classification winner	Sprints	Gediminas Bagdonas (LTU)	(National Team Lithuania)
	Team	Endura Racing	

The 2012 Baltic Chain Tour was the second modern era edition of the Baltic Chain Tour road cycling race. It was held over a period of four days between 21 and 25 May 2013. The race was a part of the 2012 UCI Europe Tour with a race classification of 2.2. General classification was won by Lithuanian cyclist Gediminas Bagdonas.

== Schedule ==
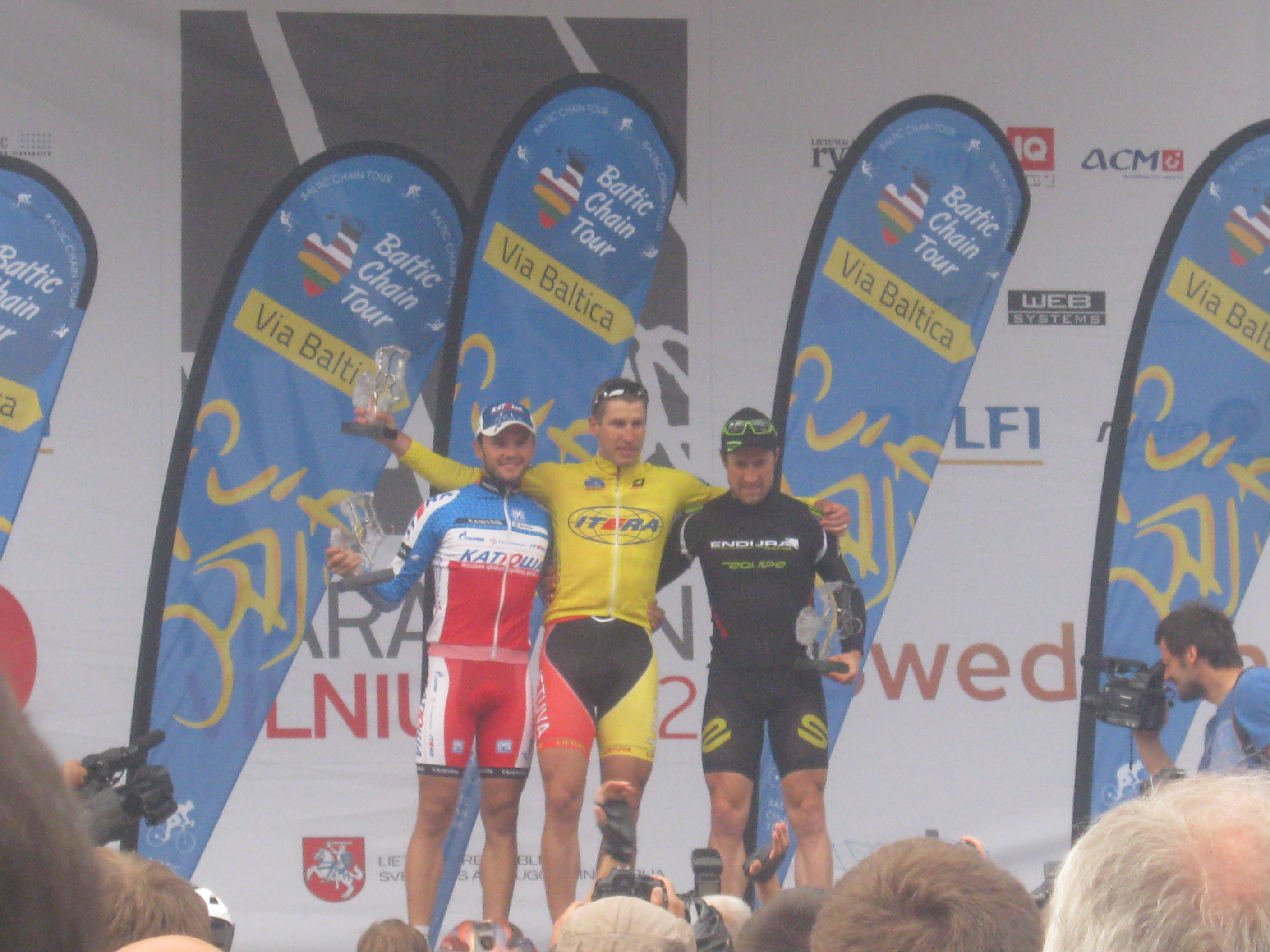
Baltic Chain Tour 2012 – top 3 overall.

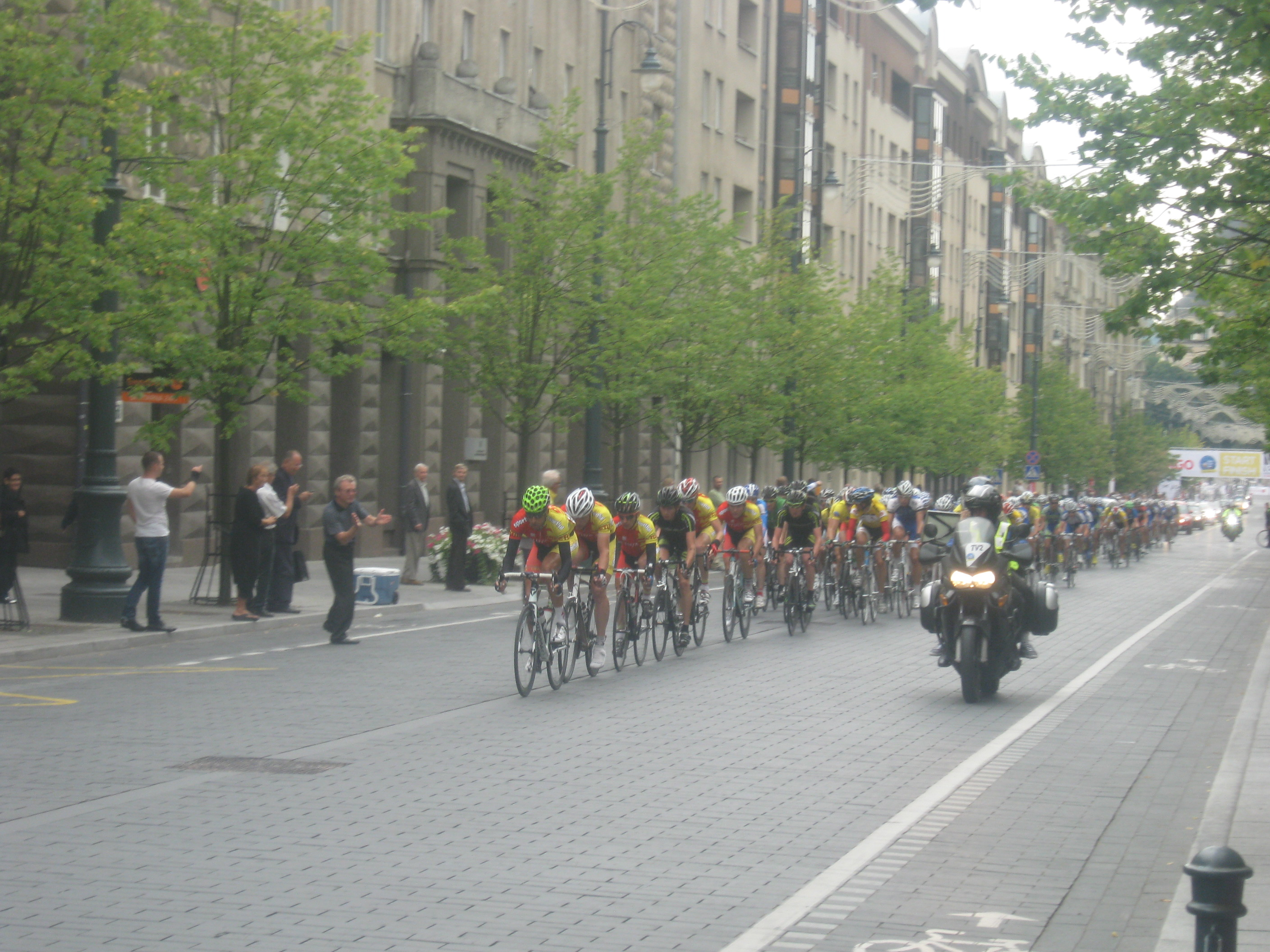
Baltic Chain Tour 2012 in Vilnius, Lithuania

Stage	Start	Finish	Distance	Date	Winner	Time
1	Tallinn	Viljandi	187.0 km	21 August	Alexander Gingsjö (SWE)	4h 36' 42"
2	Viljandi	Otepää	183.0 km	22 August	Gediminas Bagdonas (LTU)	4h 12' 12"
3	Smiltene	Rīga	180.9 km	23 August	Yuri Metlushenko (UKR)	4h 26' 04"
4	Šiauliai	Utena	180.6 km	24 August	Gediminas Bagdonas (LTU)	3h 35' 42"
5	Utena	Vilnius	142.4 km	25 August	Gediminas Bagdonas (LTU)	3h 04' 12"

== Teams ==
UCI Continental Teams
- (Latvia) Alpha Baltic–Unitymarathons.com
- (United Kingdom) Endura Racing
- (Ukraine) ISD–Lampre Continental
- (Russia) Itera–Katusha
- (Ukraine) Kolss Cycling Team
- (Turkey) Konya–Torku Şekerspor
- (Norway) Plussbank BMC
- (Latvia) Rietumu–Delfin
- (Netherlands) Cycling Team De Rijke
- (Norway) Team Ringeriks–Kraft Look
- (Germany) Thüringer Energie Team
National Teams
- National Team Belarus
- National Team Estonia
- National Team Finland
- National Team Lithuania
- National Team Slovakia
Elite Teams
- (Estonia) SJK Viiking
- Team Trek Sweden

== Stages ==
=== Stage 1 ===
21 August 2012 – Tallinn to Viljandi, 187.0 km (116.2 mi)

Stage 1 Result

	Rider	Team	Time
1	Alexander Gingsjö (SWE)	Team Trek Sweden	4h 36' 42"
2	Rick Ottema (NED)	Cycling Team De Rijke	2"
3	Jonathan McEvoy (GBR)	Endura Racing	21"
4	Gediminas Bagdonas (LTU)	National Team Lithuania	s.t.
5	Lorents Ola Aasvold (NOR)	Plussbank BMC	s.t.
6	Bas Stamsnijder (NED)	Cycling Team De Rijke	s.t.
7	Øystein Stake Laengen (NOR)	Plussbank BMC	s.t.
8	Mamyr Stash (RUS)	Itera–Katusha	s.t.
9	Indulis Bekmanis (LAT)	Rietumu–Delfin	s.t.
10	Ralf Matzka (GER)	Thüringer Energie Team	32"

General Classification after Stage 1

	Rider	Team	Time
1	Alexander Gingsjö (SWE)	Team Trek Sweden	4h 36' 32"
2	Rick Ottema (NED)	Cycling Team De Rijke	6"
3	Jonathan McEvoy (GBR)	Endura Racing	27"
4	Gediminas Bagdonas (LTU)	National Team Lithuania	28"
5	Lorents Ola Aasvold (NOR)	Plussbank BMC	31"
6	Bas Stamsnijder (NED)	Cycling Team De Rijke	s.t.
7	Øystein Stake Laengen (NOR)	Plussbank BMC	s.t.
8	Mamyr Stash (RUS)	Itera–Katusha	s.t.
9	Indulis Bekmanis (LAT)	Rietumu–Delfin	s.t.
10	Ian Wilkinson (GBR)	Endura Racing	40"

=== Stage 2 ===
22 August 2012 – Viljandi to Otepää, 183.0 km (113.7 mi)

Stage 2 Result

	Rider	Team	Time
1	Gediminas Bagdonas (LTU)	National Team Lithuania	4h 12' 12"
2	Dylan Groenewegen (NED)	Cycling Team De Rijke	s.t.
3	Indulis Bekmanis (LAT)	Rietumu–Delfin	s.t.
4	Ian Wilkinson (GBR)	Endura Racing	s.t.
5	Ralf Matzka (GER)	Thüringer Energie Team	s.t.
6	Erki Pütsep (EST)	Alpha Baltic–Unitymarathons.com	s.t.
7	Mamyr Stash (RUS)	Itera–Katusha	s.t.
8	Jonathan McEvoy (GBR)	Endura Racing	s.t.
9	Anatoliy Pakhtusov (UKR)	ISD–Lampre Continental	s.t.
10	Dean Windsor (AUS)	Endura Racing	s.t.

General Classification after Stage 2

	Rider	Team	Time
1	Alexander Gingsjö (SWE)	Team Trek Sweden	8h 48' 44"
2	Rick Ottema (NED)	Cycling Team De Rijke	6"
3	Gediminas Bagdonas (LTU)	National Team Lithuania	15"
4	Indulis Bekmanis (LAT)	Rietumu–Delfin	27"
5	Jonathan McEvoy (GBR)	Endura Racing	s.t.
6	Mamyr Stash (RUS)	Itera–Katusha	31"
7	Øystein Stake Laengen (NOR)	Plussbank BMC	s.t.
8	Lorents Ola Aasvold (NOR)	Plussbank BMC	s.t.
9	Bas Stamsnijder (NED)	Cycling Team De Rijke	s.t.
10	Dylan Groenewegen (NED)	Cycling Team De Rijke	36"

=== Stage 3 ===
23 August 2012 – Smiltene to Rīga, 280.9 km (174.5 mi)

Stage 3 Result

	Rider	Team	Time
1	Yuri Metlushenko (UKR)	Konya–Torku Şekerspor	4h 26' 04"
2	Gediminas Bagdonas (LTU)	National Team Lithuania	s.t.
3	Dylan Groenewegen (NED)	Cycling Team De Rijke	s.t.
4	Emīls Liepiņš (LAT)	Rietumu–Delfin	s.t.
5	Håkon Frengstad Berger (NOR)	Team Ringeriks–Kraft Look	s.t.
6	Jonathan McEvoy (GBR)	Endura Racing	s.t.
7	Mamyr Stash (RUS)	Itera–Katusha	s.t.
8	Mihkel Räim (EST)	SJK Viiking	s.t.
9	Ralf Matzka (GER)	Thüringer Energie Team	s.t.
10	Darijus Džervus (LTU)	National Team Lithuania	s.t.

General Classification after Stage 3

	Rider	Team	Time
1	Alexander Gingsjö (SWE)	Team Trek Sweden	13h 14' 48"
2	Gediminas Bagdonas (LTU)	National Team Lithuania	8"
3	Rick Ottema (NED)	Cycling Team De Rijke	14"
4	Jonathan McEvoy (GBR)	Endura Racing	27"
5	Indulis Bekmanis (LAT)	Rietumu–Delfin	s.t.
6	Bas Stamsnijder (NED)	Cycling Team De Rijke	28"
7	Mamyr Stash (RUS)	Itera–Katusha	31"
8	Lorents Ola Aasvold (NOR)	Plussbank BMC	s.t.
9	Øystein Stake Laengen (NOR)	Plussbank BMC	s.t.
10	Yuri Metlushenko (UKR)	Konya–Torku Şekerspor	32"

=== Stage 4 ===
24 August 2012 – Šiauliai to Utena, 180.6 km (112.2 mi)

Stage 4 Result

	Rider	Team	Time
1	Gediminas Bagdonas (LTU)	National Team Lithuania	3h 35' 42"
2	Viktor Shmalko (RUS)	Itera–Katusha	s.t.
3	Dean Windsor (AUS)	Endura Racing	s.t.
4	Mykhaylo Kononenko (UKR)	Kolss Cycling Team	s.t.
5	Ian Wilkinson (GBR)	Endura Racing	s.t.
6	Ike Groen (NED)	Cycling Team De Rijke	s.t.
7	Volodymyr Gomenuk (UKR)	Kolss Cycling Team	3"
8	Darijus Džervus (LTU)	National Team Lithuania	19"
9	Dmytro Volovod (UKR)	ISD–Lampre Continental	s.t.
10	Erki Pütsep (EST)	Alpha Baltic–Unitymarathons.com	s.t.

General Classification after Stage 4

	Rider	Team	Time
1	Gediminas Bagdonas (LTU)	National Team Lithuania	16h 50' 23"
2	Viktor Shmalko (RUS)	Itera–Katusha	41"
3	Ian Wilkinson (GBR)	Endura Racing	s.t.
4	Dean Windsor (AUS)	Endura Racing	45"
5	Mykhaylo Kononenko (UKR)	Kolss Cycling Team	49"
6	Ike Groen (NED)	Cycling Team De Rijke	s.t.
7	Volodymyr Gomenuk (UKR)	Kolss Cycling Team	52"
8	Jonathan McEvoy (GBR)	Endura Racing	53"
9	Indulis Bekmanis (LAT)	Rietumu–Delfin	s.t.
10	Mamyr Stash (RUS)	Itera–Katusha	57"

=== Stage 5 ===
25 August 2012 – Utena to Vilnius, 142.4 km (88.5 mi)

Stage 5 Result

	Rider	Team	Time
1	Gediminas Bagdonas (LTU)	National Team Lithuania	3h 04' 12"
2	Ralf Matzka (GER)	Thüringer Energie Team	s.t.
3	Emīls Liepiņš (LAT)	Rietumu–Delfin	s.t.
4	Jonathan McEvoy (GBR)	Endura Racing	s.t.
5	Dean Windsor (AUS)	Endura Racing	s.t.
6	Dylan Groenewegen (NED)	Cycling Team De Rijke	s.t.
7	Ian Wilkinson (GBR)	Endura Racing	s.t.
8	Mykhaylo Kononenko (UKR)	Kolss Cycling Team	s.t.
9	Viktor Shmalko (RUS)	Itera–Katusha	s.t.
10	Mikita Zharoven (BLR)	National Team Belarus	s.t.

General Classification after Stage 5

	Rider	Team	Time
1	Gediminas Bagdonas (LTU)	National Team Lithuania	19h 54' 25"
2	Viktor Shmalko (RUS)	Itera–Katusha	48"
3	Ian Wilkinson (GBR)	Endura Racing	49"
4	Dean Windsor (AUS)	Endura Racing	55"
5	Mykhaylo Kononenko (UKR)	Kolss Cycling Team	58"
6	Jonathan McEvoy (GBR)	Endura Racing	1'03"
7	Indulis Bekmanis (LAT)	Rietumu–Delfin	s.t.
8	Ike Groen (NED)	Cycling Team De Rijke	1'06"
9	Mamyr Stash (RUS)	Itera–Katusha	1'07"
10	Øystein Stake Laengen (NOR)	Plussbank BMC	s.t.

== Classification leadership table ==
Stage	Stage winner	General Classification	Sprint	King of the Mountains	Young riders classification (U26)	Team classification
1	Alexander Gingsjö	Alexander Gingsjö	Gediminas Bagdonas	Alexander Gingsjö	Rick Ottema	Cycling Team De Rijke
2	Gediminas Bagdonas	Alexander Gingsjö	Gediminas Bagdonas	Alexander Gingsjö	Rick Ottema	Cycling Team De Rijke
3	Yuri Metlushenko	Alexander Gingsjö	Gediminas Bagdonas	Mihkel Räim	Rick Ottema	Cycling Team De Rijke
4	Gediminas Bagdonas	Gediminas Bagdonas	Gediminas Bagdonas	Mihkel Räim	Viktor Shmalko	Endura Racing
5	Gediminas Bagdonas	Gediminas Bagdonas	Gediminas Bagdonas	Mihkel Räim	Viktor Shmalko	Endura Racing
Final		Gediminas Bagdonas	Gediminas Bagdonas	Mihkel Räim	Viktor Shmalko	Endura Racing

== Final standings ==
=== General classification ===
	Rider	Team	Time
1	Gediminas Bagdonas (LTU)	National Team Lithuania	19h 54' 25"
2	Viktor Shmalko (RUS)	Itera–Katusha	48"
3	Ian Wilkinson (GBR)	Endura Racing	49"
4	Dean Windsor (AUS)	Endura Racing	55"
5	Mykhaylo Kononenko (UKR)	Kolss Cycling Team	58"
6	Jonathan McEvoy (GBR)	Endura Racing	1'03"
7	Indulis Bekmanis (LAT)	Rietumu–Delfin	s.t.
8	Ike Groen (NED)	Cycling Team De Rijke	1'06"
9	Mamyr Stash (RUS)	Itera–Katusha	1'07"
10	Øystein Stake Laengen (NOR)	Plussbank BMC	s.t.

=== Sprint classification ===
	Rider	Team	Points
1	Gediminas Bagdonas (LTU)	National Team Lithuania	12
2	Ian Wilkinson (GBR)	Endura Racing	10
3	Viktor Shmalko (RUS)	Itera–Katusha	5
4	Andreas Erland (NOR)	Plussbank BMC	3
5	John Anderson (AUS)	Endura Racing	3
6	Bas Stamsnijder (NED)	Cycling Team De Rijke	3
7	Alexander Evtushenko (RUS)	Itera–Katusha	3
8	Marius Bernatonis (LTU)	National Team Lithuania	2
9	Darijus Džervus (LTU)	National Team Lithuania	2
10	Artur Shaymuratov (RUS)	Itera–Katusha	2

=== Mountains classification ===
	Rider	Team	Points
1	Mihkel Räim (EST)	SJK Viiking	7
2	Dean Windsor (AUS)	Endura Racing	5
3	John Anderson (AUS)	Endura Racing	3
4	Alexander Gingsjö (SWE)	Team Trek Sweden	3
5	Mykhaylo Kononenko (UKR)	Kolss Cycling Team	2
6	Andreas Erland (NOR)	Plussbank BMC	2
7	Rick Ottema (NED)	Cycling Team De Rijke	2
8	Mikita Zharoven (BLR)	National Team Belarus	2
9	Gediminas Bagdonas (LTU)	National Team Lithuania	1
10	Viktor Shmalko (RUS)	Itera–Katusha	1

=== Young riders classification ===
	Rider	Team	Time
1	Viktor Shmalko (RUS)	Itera–Katusha	19h 55' 13"
2	Ike Groen (NED)	Cycling Team De Rijke	18"
3	Mamyr Stash (RUS)	Itera–Katusha	19"
4	Dylan Groenewegen (NED)	Cycling Team De Rijke	20
5	Emīls Liepiņš (LAT)	Rietumu–Delfin	26"
6	Andreas Erland (NOR)	Plussbank BMC	27"
7	Roman Katyrin (RUS)	Itera–Katusha	30"
8	Denys Karnulin (UKR)	ISD–Lampre Continental	s.t.
9	Darijus Džervus (LTU)	National Team Lithuania	35"
10	Sindre Eid Hermansen (NOR)	Team Ringeriks–Kraft Look	37"

=== Team classification ===
	Team	Points
1	(United Kingdom) Endura Racing	59h 46' 20"
2	(Russia) Itera–Katusha	19"
3	(Ukraine) Kolss Cycling Team	21"
4	National Team Lithuania	26"
5	(Norway) Plussbank BMC	27"
6	(Latvia) Rietumu–Delfin	45"
7	(Netherlands) Cycling Team De Rijke	3'46"
8	(Ukraine) ISD–Lampre Continental	7'26"
9	(Norway) Team Ringeriks–Kraft Look	8'22"
10	(Turkey) Konya–Torku Şekerspor	s.t.
