= Team Tre Berg–PostNord =

Team information
- UCI code: TTB
- Registered: Sweden
- Founded: 2015
- Disbanded: 2017
- Discipline: Road
- Status: UCI Continental

Key personnel
- General manager: Thomas Löfkvist
- Team managers: Martin Vestby; Stefan Adamsson; John Nilsson

Team name history
- 2015–2016 2017: Team Tre Berg–Bianchi; Team Tre Berg–PostNord

Team Tre Berg–PostNord is a UCI Continental team founded in 2015 and based in Sweden. It participated in UCI Continental Circuits races until the end of the 2017 season.

== Team roster ==
Rider	Date of birth
Ludvig Bengtsson (SWE)	24 October 1993 (age 32)
Marcus Fåglum (SWE)	20 July 1994 (age 32)
Niklas Gustavsson (SWE)	28 January 1989 (age 37)
Pontus Kastemyr (SWE)	28 March 1995 (age 31)
Richard Larsén (SWE)	8 May 1990 (age 36)

Rider	Date of birth
Isac Lundgren (SWE)	30 August 1992 (age 34)
Kim Magnusson (SWE)	31 August 1992 (age 34)
Erik Sandersson (SWE)	10 December 1998 (age 27)
Alexander Wetterhall (SWE)	12 April 1986 (age 40)

== Major wins ==
2015
Sweden National Road Race Championship, Alexander Gingsjö
Stage 3 Baltic Chain Tour, Alexander Gingsjö
2016
Sweden National Road Race Championship, Richard Larsén
Sweden National Time Trial Championship, Alexander Wetterhall

== National champions ==
2015
Sweden Road Race, Alexander Gingsjö
2016
Sweden Road Race, Richard Larsén
Sweden Time Trial, Alexander Wetterhall
