= Piotr Kirpsza =

Polish cyclist

Personal information
- Full name: Piotr Kirpsza
- Born: 27 May 1989 (age 37) Poland

Cycling career
- Sport: Cycling
- Current team: Retired
- Discipline: Road
- Role: Rider

Professional teams
- 2010: Aktio Group Mostostal Puławy
- 2012–2014: BDC–Marcpol Team
- 2015: Kolss BDC Team

Piotr Kirpsza (born 27 May 1989) is a Polish former professional racing cyclist. He rode at the 2014 UCI Road World Championships.

== Major results ==
2010
7th Overall Carpathia Couriers Paths
9th Memoriał Andrzeja Trochanowskiego
2011
5th Overall Carpathia Couriers Paths
2012
6th Puchar Ministra Obrony Narodowej
2013
1st Stage 4 (TTT) Dookoła Mazowsza
2nd Overall Tour de Serbie

1st Points classification

6th Les Challenges de la Marche Verte – GP Al Massira
2014
6th Visegrad 4 Bicycle Race – GP Polski
7th Tour Bohemia
9th Overall Baltic Chain Tour
