= Žydrūnas =

Žydrūnas is a Lithuanian masculine given name and may refer to:

- Žydrūnas Ilgauskas (born 1975), Lithuanian basketball player
- Žydrūnas Karčemarskas (born 1983), Lithuanian footballer
- Žydrūnas Savickas (born 1975), Lithuanian strongman
- Žydrūnas Savickas (cyclist) (born 1991), Lithuanian cyclist
- Žydrūnas Urbonas (born 1976), Lithuanian basketball player
