= Paajanen =

Paajanen is a Finnish surname. Notable people with the surname include:

- Severi Paajanen (born 1986), Finnish footballer
- Paavo Paajanen (born 1988), Finnish racing cyclist
- Otto Paajanen (born 1992), Finnish ice hockey player
