= 2011 Baltic Chain Tour =

International cycling stage race

2011 UCI Europe Tour

Race details
- Dates: 17—20 August 2012
- Stages: 4
- Distance: 637.6 km (396.2 mi)
- Winning time: 14h 39' 16"

Results
Jersey awarded to the overall winner	Winner	Erki Pütsep (EST)	(Alpha Baltic–Unitymarathons.com)
	Second	Igor Boev (RUS)	(National Team Russia)
	Third	Ivo Suur (EST)	(Nissan Pro Shop Team)
Jersey awarded to the mountains classification winner	Mountains	Volodymyr Gomenuk (UKR)	(Kolss Cycling Team)
Jersey awarded to the youth classification winner	Youth	Igor Boev (RUS)	(National Team Russia)
Jersey awarded to the sprints classification winner	Sprints	Gediminas Bagdonas (LTU)	(National Team Lithuania)
	Team	Alpha Baltic–Unitymarathons.com	

The 2011 Baltic Chain Tour was the inaugural modern era edition of the Baltic Chain Tour road cycling race. It was held over a period of four days between 17 and 20 May 2013. The race was a part of the 2012 UCI Europe Tour with a race classification of 2.2. General classification was won by Estonian cyclist Erki Pütsep.

== Schedule ==
Stage	Start	Finish	Distance	Date	Winner	Time
P	Vilnius	Vilnius	3.0 km	16 August	Gediminas Bagdonas (LTU)	0h 3' 37"
1	Vilnius	Panevėžys	175.0 km	17 August	Gediminas Bagdonas (LTU)	4h 06' 08"
2	Panevėžys	Šiauliai	165.8 km	18 August	Indulis Bekmanis (LAT)	3h 48' 49"
3	Rīga	Sigulda	139.6 km	19 August	Raimondas Rumšas (LTU)	3h 06' 26"
4	Viljandi	Viljandi	153.0 km	20 August	Volodymyr Gomenuk (UKR)	3h 36' 03"

== Classification leadership table ==
Stage	Stage winner	General Classification	Sprint	King of the Mountains	Young riders classification (U26)	Team classification
P	Gediminas Bagdonas	Gediminas Bagdonas			Ramūnas Navardauskas	National Team Lithuania
1	Gediminas Bagdonas	Gediminas Bagdonas	Gediminas Bagdonas	Andris Smirnovs	Ramūnas Navardauskas	National Team Lithuania
2	Indulis Bekmanis	Indulis Bekmanis	Armands Bēcis	Andris Smirnovs	Indulis Bekmanis	National Team Lithuania
3	Raimundas Rumsas	Indulis Bekmanis	Armands Bēcis	Andris Smirnovs	Indulis Bekmanis	National Team Lithuania
4	Volodymyr Gomenuk	Erki Pütsep	Gediminas Bagdonas	Volodymyr Gomenuk	Igor Boev	Alpha Baltic–Unitymarathons.com
Final		Erki Pütsep	Gediminas Bagdonas	Volodymyr Gomenuk	Igor Boev	Alpha Baltic–Unitymarathons.com
