= Ian Wilkinson (cyclist) =

English racing cyclist (born 1979)

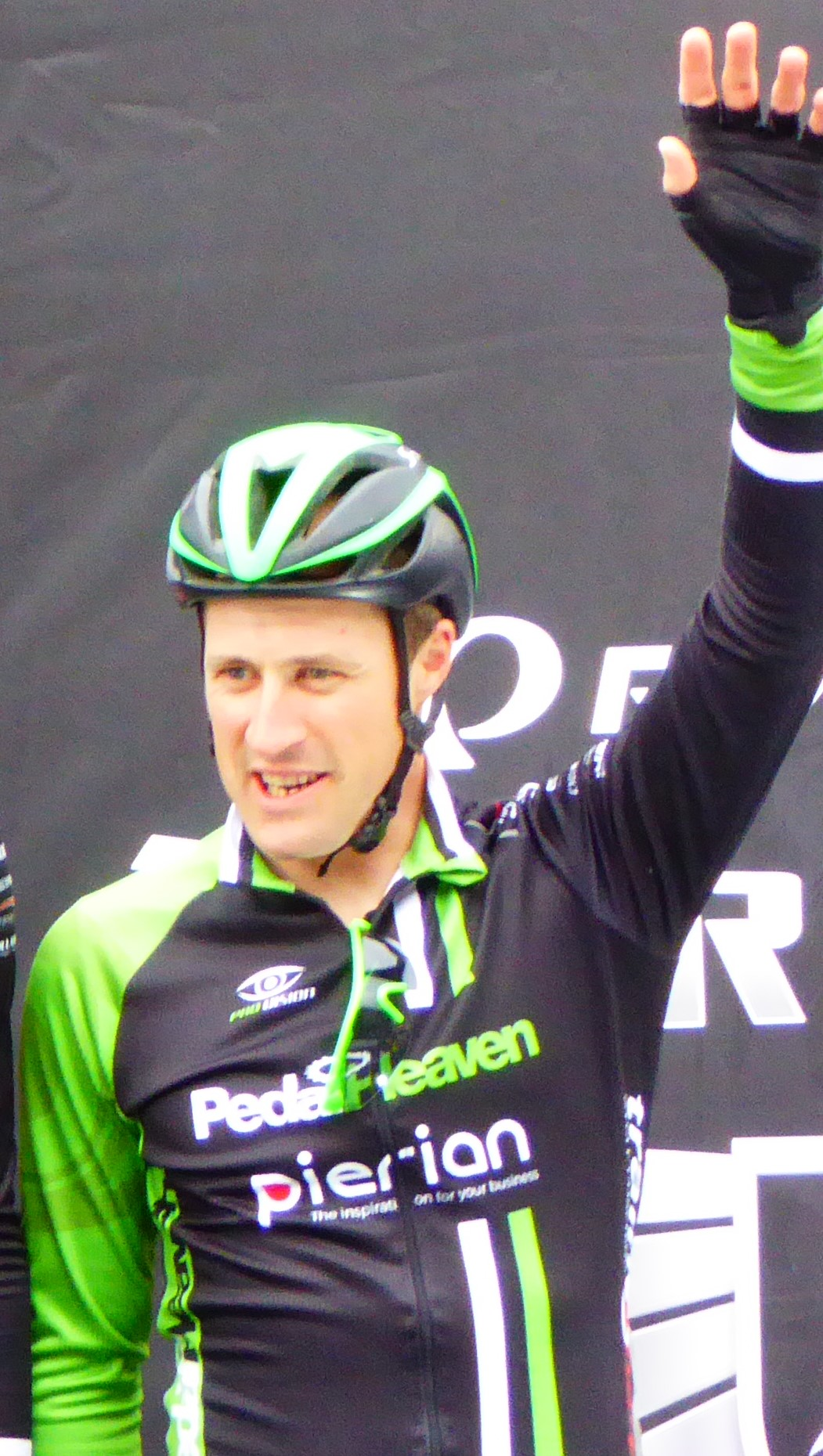
- Wilkinson in 2016

Personal information
- Full name: Ian Wilkinson
- Nickname: Superman
- Born: 14 April 1979 (age 47) Bristol, England
- Height: 1.77 m (5 ft 10 in)
- Weight: 78 kg (172 lb; 12.3 st)

Cycling career
- Sport: Cycling
- Current team: Spartans Velo Club
- Disciplines: Road; Mountain biking; Cyclo-cross
- Role: Rider
- Rider type: Criteriums (road); Cross-country (MTB); Cyclo-cross

Amateur teams
- Trek Y2K (WCPP)
- UCVA Troyes
- Scienceinsport.RT
- Giant Racing
- Science in Sport /Trek
- 2019–: Spartans Velo Club

Professional teams
- 2009: Team Halfords
- 2010–2012: Endura Racing
- 2013: Team UK Youth
- 2014–2015: Team Raleigh
- 2016: Pedal Heaven

Ian Wilkinson (born 14 April 1979) is a British racing cyclist from England, who currently rides for British amateur team Spartans Velo Club. A prolific rider, he competes at the top level in cross country and marathon mountain bike racing, cyclo-cross, circuit and road racing. He is a multiple national champion, winning championships as a junior, under 23 and senior rider. He has represented Great Britain at many international events such as World Championships and World Cups in several disciplines. Outside of cycling, Wilkinson's occupation is as a builder.

== Career ==
From Barnoldswick in Lancashire, Wilkinson was a member of British Cycling's World Class Performance Plan between 1999 and 2001. He then went to France to ride on the road for a year before returning to Great Britain to ride for ScienceinSport.com, followed by stints riding for Giant RT and Science in Sport/Trek.

For the 2009 season, Wilkinson signed up with Team Halfords. In 2010, Wilkinson joined Endura Racing, remaining with the squad for three seasons before joining Team UK Youth in 2013. He was announced as part of the Team Raleigh squad for 2014.

== Major results ==
2000
1st Cross-country, National Under-23 Mountain Bike Championships
6th Cross-country, UEC European Under-23 Mountain Bike Championships
2005
3rd Marathon, National Mountain Bike Championships
2006
1st Ellis Briggs Grand Prix
2nd Overall National Cross-country Points Series

2nd Round 1, Sherwood
2nd Round 3, Drumlanrig
3rd Round 4, Newnham Park
7th Round 2, Margam Country Park

5th Overall National Circuit Race Series

2nd Clitheroe Grand Prix
3rd Otley Grand Prix
3rd Colne Grand Prix
3rd Travelwise Warwick Town Centre Circuit Races
4th Beverley Town Centre Circuit Races
6th Rochdale Grand Prix

8th National Criterium Championships
8th Cross-country, National Mountain Bike Championships
8th Overall Premier Calendar

6th Girvan 3 Day
7th Lincoln Grand Prix

2007
1st Overall Girvan 3 Day

1st Stage 3

National Cross-Country Series

1st Sherwood
4th Margam Park

1st Roger Martin Memorial Road Race
2nd Cross-country, National Mountain Bike Championships
2nd East Midlands International CiCLE Classic
3rd Overall Bikeline 2 Day
4th Rochdale Grand Prix
5th Cheltenham, National Cyclo-cross Trophy
7th Lincoln Grand Prix
7th Blackpool Grand Prix
7th Colne Grand Prix
10th Ryedale Grand Prix
2008
National Mountain Bike Championships

1st Marathon cross-country
3rd Cross-country

1st Colne Grand Prix Elite Circuit Race
1st Salford Nocturne
1st Preston City Centre Criterium
2nd Travelwise Warwick Town Centre Circuit Races
5th National Criterium Championships
6th National Cyclo-cross Championships
7th Overall Bikeline 2 Day

1st Stages 1 & 3

8th Overall Girvan 3 Day
9th East Midlands International CiCLE Classic
2009
1st Rutland–Melton CiCLE Classic
1st Warwick Town Centre Race
1st Newcastle Leazes Criterium
2nd Chas Messenger Trophy Road Race
2nd Lincoln Grand Prix
3rd Rochdale Grand Prix Circuit Race
4th Overall Girvan 3-Day Road Race
4th Eddie Soens Memorial Road Race
4th Beaumont Trophy
5th Overall Rás Tailteann

1st Stage 2

6th Blackpool Nocturne
7th East Yorkshire Classic Circuit Race
8th Blackburn Grand Prix
2010
1st Overall National Circuit Series

1st Dumfries Bike Fest Circuit Race
2nd Colne Grand Prix

1st Newport Nocturne
2nd National Criterium Championships
2nd Tour of the Reservoir
2011
3rd East Yorkshire Classic
4th Tour de Mumbai II
4th Clayton Velo Classic
6th Tour de Mumbai I
9th Smithfield Nocturne
2012
1st Stage 3 Tour de Normandie
2nd Beverbeek Classic
2nd Newport Nocturne
3rd Overall Baltic Chain Tour
6th Grand Prix Impanis-Van Petegem
2013
1st Rutland–Melton CiCLE Classic
1st Stockton Grand Prix
3rd National Criterium Championships
5th Perfs Pedal Race
6th Colne Grand Prix
2014
1st Eddie Soens Memorial
4th Newport Nocturne
6th Leicester Castle Classic
2015
3rd Eddie Soens Memorial
5th Rutland–Melton CiCLE Classic
10th Milk Race
10th Leicester Castle Classic
2016
3rd Clayton Spring Classic
5th Jim Rogers Memorial Road Race
