= Alexander Gingsjö =

Swedish cyclist

Personal information
- Born: 23 December 1980 (age 45) Sweden

Cycling career
- Sport: Cycling
- Discipline: Road
- Role: Rider
- Rider type: Rouleur

Amateur teams
- 2009: ECI Champion
- 2010–2011: Nordic Eco–Vallentuna
- 2012: Trek Sweden Racing
- 2014: Södertälje CK
- 2017–2019: CK HVR16

Professional teams
- 2013: Team People4you–Unaas Cycling
- 2015–2016: Team Tre Berg–Bianchi

Major wins
- One-day races and Classics National Road Race Championships (2015) National Time Trial Championships (2014)

Alexander Gingsjö (born 23 December 1980) is a Swedish road cyclist. He competed at the 2014 UCI Road World Championships.

== Major results ==
2011
2nd Road race, National Road Championships
5th Scandinavian Race Uppsala
2012
1st Stage 1 Baltic Chain Tour
2013
1st Scandinavian Race Uppsala
2014
1st Time trial, National Road Championships
2015
1st Road race, National Road Championships
1st Stage 3 Baltic Chain Tour
