= 2009 FDB Insurance Ras =

2009 Rás Tailteann
Race details
- Dates: May 17 – May 24
- Stages: 8
- Distance: 1,289 km (800.9 mi)
- Winning time: 30h 57' 17"

Results
	Winner	Simon Richardson (GBR)	(Rapha Condor)
	Second	Mads Christensen (DEN)	(Team Designa Køkken)
	Third	Jan Bárta (CZE)	(KTM–Junkers)
	Points	Niko Eeckhout (BEL)	(An Post–Sean Kelly)
	Mountains	David O'Loughlin (IRL)	(An Post–Sean Kelly)
	Youth	Mark McNally (GBR)	(Team Halfords Bike Hut)

The 2009 Rás Tailteann was the 57th edition of the Rás Tailteann cycle race. The race took place over 8 days between 17–24 May 2009. The race was sponsored by FBD Insurance.

== Results ==
=== General classification ===
	Cyclist	Team	Time
1	Simon Richardson (GBR)	Rapha Condor	+ 30h 57' 17"
2	Mads Christensen (DEN)	Team Designa Køkken	+ 2' 49"
3	Jan Bárta (CZE)	KTM–Junkers	+ 3' 02"
4	Darren Lapthorne (AUS)	Rapha Condor	+ 3' 24"
5	Ian Wilkinson (GBR)	Team Halfords Bike Hut	+ 3' 29"
6	Chris Newton (GBR)	Rapha Condor	+ 5' 29"
7	Russell Downing (GBR)	Candi TV - Pinarello RT	+ 6' 07"
8	David McCann (IRL)	Irish National Team	+ 6' 09"
9	Alexander Gottfried (GER)	Team Kuota-Indeland	+ 6' 38"
10	David O'Loughlin (IRL)	An Post–Sean Kelly	+ 6' 53"

== Jersey progress ==
Stage (Winner)	General Classification	Points Classification	Mountains Classification	Young Rider Classification
Stage 1 (Niko Eeckhout)	Niko Eeckhout	Niko Eeckhout	Colin Robinson	Nicholas Walker
Stage 2 (Ian Wilkinson)	Ian Wilkinson	Ian Wilkinson	Peter Williams	Ole Jogen Jenson
Stage 3 (Jaan Kirsipuu)	Ian Wilkinson	Russell Downing	David McCann	Ole Jogen Jenson
Stage 4 (Nicholas Walker)	Simon Richardson	Russell Downing	David O'Loughlin	Mark McNally
Stage 5 (Nicholas Walker)	Simon Richardson	Russell Downing	David O'Loughlin	Mark McNally
Stage 6 (Paul Healion)	Simon Richardson	Russell Downing	David O'Loughlin	Mark McNally
Stage 7 (Sam Bennett)	Simon Richardson	Niko Eeckhout	David O'Loughlin	Mark McNally
Stage 8 (Jaan Kirsipuu)	Simon Richardson	Niko Eeckhout	David O'Loughlin	Mark McNally
Final	Simon Richardson	Niko Eeckhout	David O'Loughlin	Mark McNally
