= Mamyr Stash =

Russian cyclist

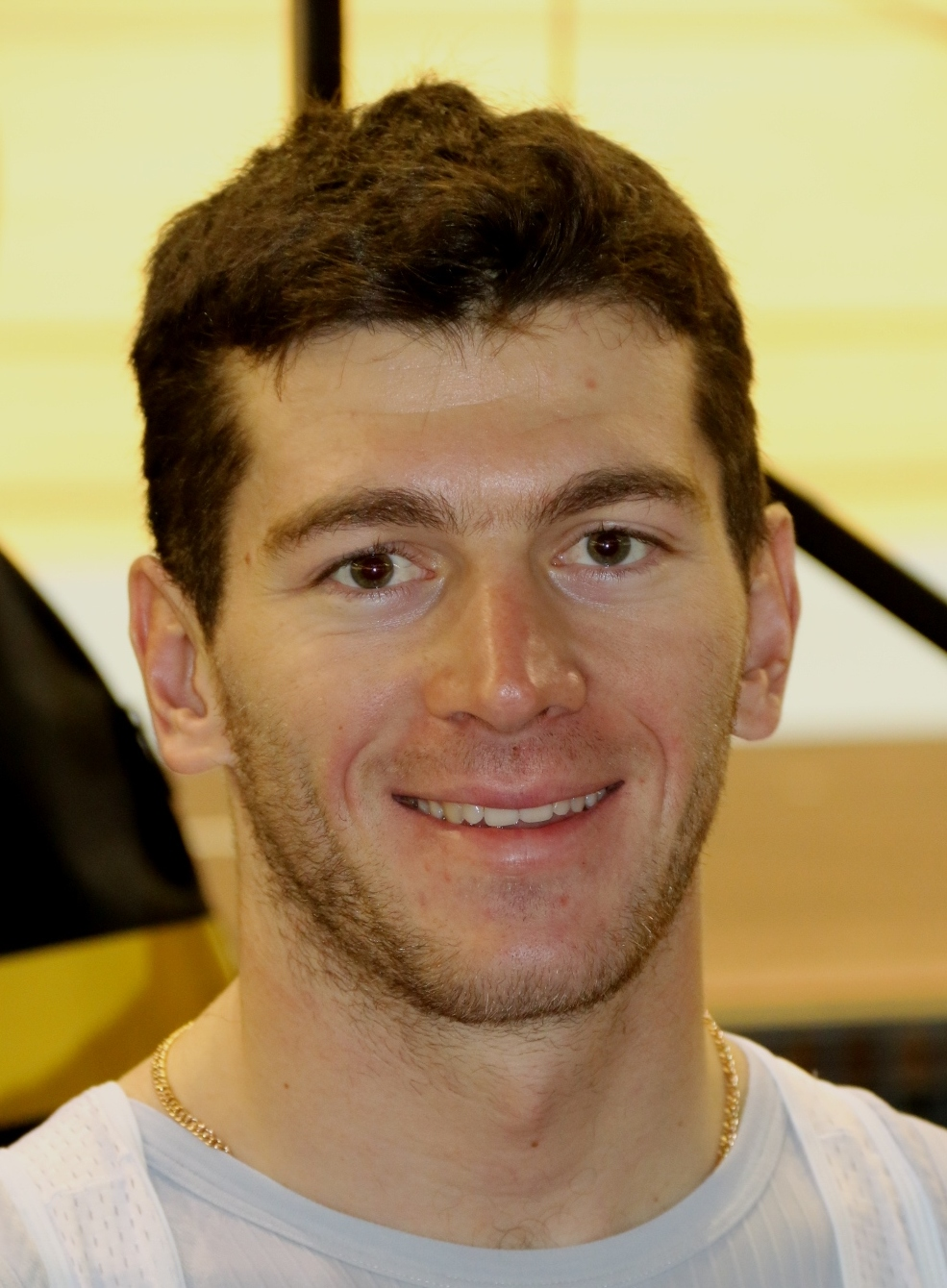
- Stash in 2017

Personal information
- Full name: Mamyr Basam Stash
- Born: 4 May 1993 (age 33) Maykop, Russia
- Height: 1.86 m (6 ft 1 in)
- Weight: 77 kg (170 lb)

Cycling career
- Sport: Cycling
- Current team: Minsk Cycling Club
- Disciplines: Road; Track
- Role: Rider
- Rider type: Sprinter

Amateur teams
- 2013: Russian Helicopters
- 2023–: Minsk Cycling Club

Professional teams
- 2014: Itera–Katusha
- 2015–2016: RusVelo
- 2017–2018: Lokosphinx
- 2019: Gazprom–RusVelo
- 2020–2021: Spor Toto Cycling Team
- 2022: Vozrozhdenie
Medal record
Representing Russia
Men's road bicycle racing
European Road Championships
Silver medal – second place	2015 Tartu	Under-23 road race
Men's track cycling
European Championships
Bronze medal – third place	2017 Berlin	Team pursuit

Mamyr Basam Stash (Russian: Мамыр Басам Сташ; born 4 May 1993) is a Russian racing cyclist, who rides for Russian amateur team Minsk Cycling Club.

== Major results ==
2012
9th Overall Baltic Chain Tour
2013
1st Stage 5 Grand Prix of Adygeya
2014
1st Central European Tour Szerencs–Ibrány
Tour of Kavkaz

1st Points classification
1st Stages 1 & 3

5th Central European Tour Budapest GP
2015
2nd Road race, UEC European Under-23 Road Championships
4th Overall ZLM Tour
4th Grand Prix of Moscow
5th Memorial Grundmanna I Wizowskiego
6th Overall Baltic Chain Tour
2016
2nd Trofej Umag
4th Overall Baltic Chain Tour
8th Handzame Classic
2017
1st Stage 4 Flèche du Sud
2018
1st Stage 3 Course de Solidarność et des Champions Olympiques
10th Clássica da Arrábida
2019
1st Stage 3b (TTT) Vuelta Ciclista a Costa Rica
2020
1st Grand Prix Gazipaşa
5th Grand Prix Central Anatolia
6th GP Antalya
6th Grand Prix Velo Erciyes
7th Grand Prix Manavgat–Side
8th Grand Prix Develi
9th Grand Prix Cappadocia
2021
2nd Grand Prix Gazipaşa
7th GP Mediterranean
8th Grand Prix Velo Manavgat
2022
1st Grand Prix Velo Manavgat
4th Grand Prix Megasaray
7th Grand Prix Gazipaşa
