= Jarno Gmelich =

Dutch cyclist

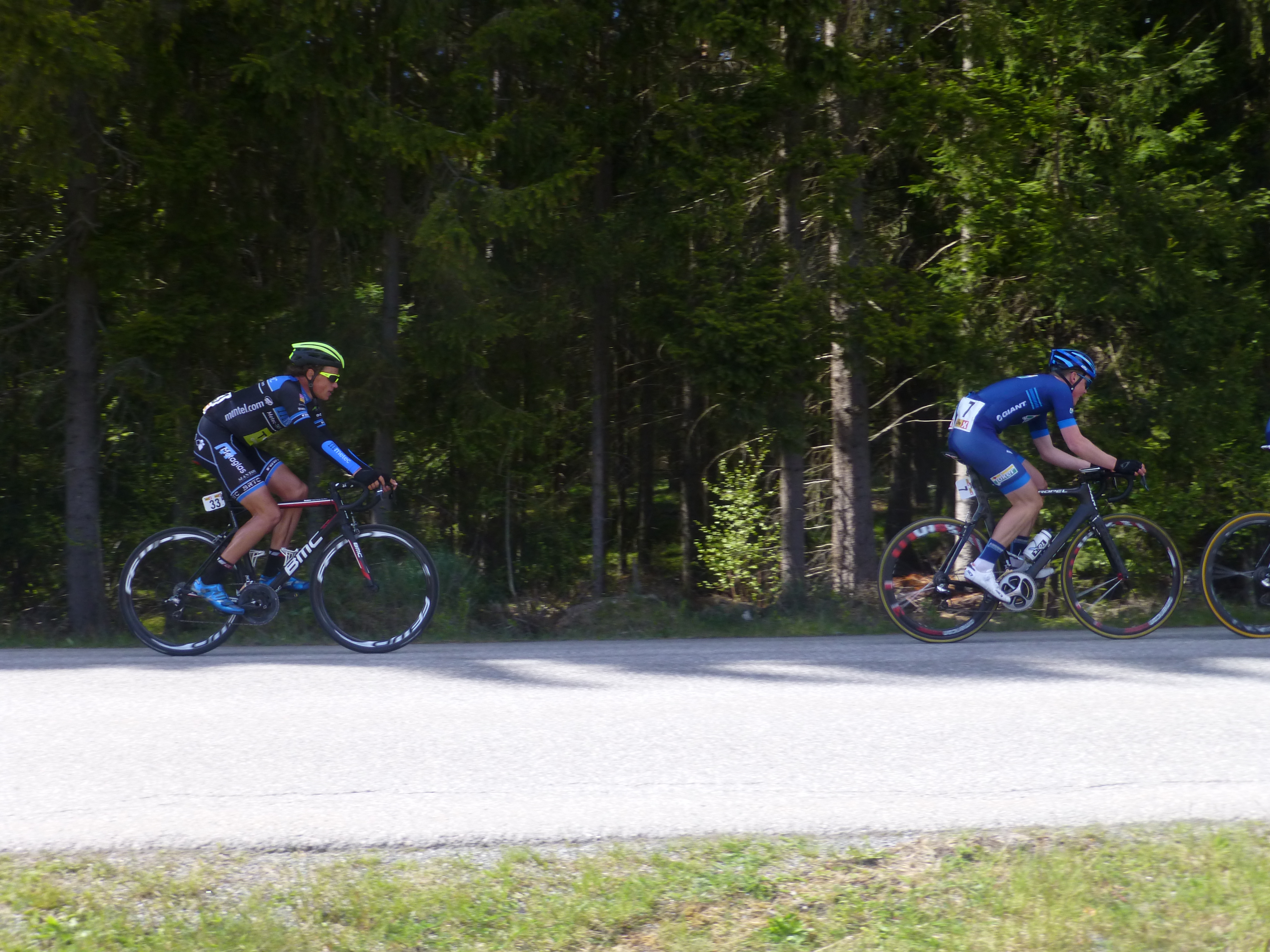
- Gmelich (33) at the 2015 Ringerike GP.

Personal information
- Full name: Jarno Gmelich Meijling
- Born: 21 June 1989 (age 37) Almere, Netherlands
- Height: 1.86 m (6 ft 1 in)
- Weight: 77 kg (170 lb)

Cycling career
- Sport: Cycling
- Current team: EEW–VDK Cyclingteam
- Discipline: Road
- Role: Rider; Directeur sportif

Amateur teams
- 2012–2013: AVC Aix-en-Provence
- 2019: UWTC de Volharding
- 2020–2021: Allinq–Krush–WV IJsselstreek
- 2022: Monda Vakantieparken–IJsselstreek

Professional teams
- 2008–2009: Van Vliet–EBH Elshof
- 2010–2011: Cycling Team Jo Piels
- 2014–2018: Metec–TKH

Managerial team
- 2023–: Allinq Continental Cycling Team

Jarno Gmelich Meijling (born 21 June 1989 in Almere) is a Dutch former cyclist, who now works as a directeur sportif for UCI Continental team EEW–VDK Cyclingteam.

== Major results ==
2007
2nd Time trial, National Junior Road Championships
2009
6th Overall Tour du Haut-Anjou
2010
2nd Ronde van Midden-Nederland
3rd Overall Mainfranken-Tour

1st Prologue

5th Overall Tour de Berlin
2011
8th Overall Kreiz Breizh Elites
2012
10th Scandinavian Race Uppsala
2013
5th Overall Circuit des Ardennes
6th Gran Premio San Giuseppe
2014
1st Stage 1 (TTT) Okolo Slovenska
6th Overall Czech Cycling Tour

1st Stage 1 (TTT)

8th Overall Kreiz Breizh Elites
8th Omloop der Kempen
2015
7th Gooikse Pijl
8th Overall Volta ao Alentejo
8th Hadeland GP
2016
1st Stage 4 Volta ao Alentejo
4th Overall Kreiz Breizh Elites
2017
4th De Kustpijl
5th Overall Course de la Solidarité Olympique
