= EEW–VDK Cyclingteam =

Dutch cycling team

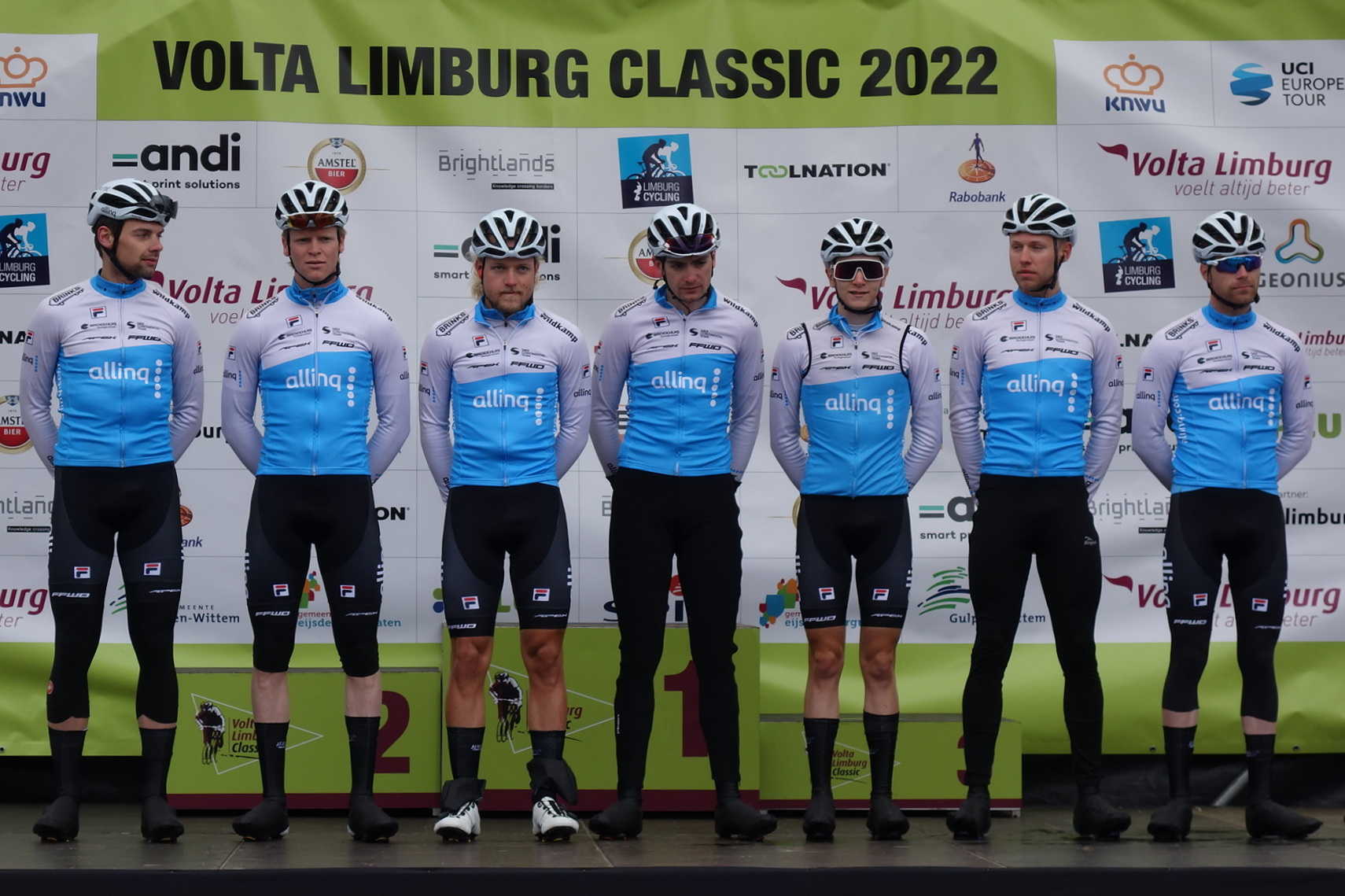

Team information
- UCI code: EEW
- Registered: Netherlands
- Founded: 2019
- Discipline: Road
- Status: Club (2019–2021); UCI Continental (2022–)

Key personnel
- General manager: Erik Dekker
- Team managers: Jarno Gmelich Meijling; Marc Janssen; Rens te Stroet

Team name history
- 2021 2022–2023 2024–2025 2026–: ALLINQ–Krush–IJsselstreek Cycling Team; Allinq Continental Cycling Team; Diftar Continental Cyclingteam; EEW–VDK Cyclingteam

EEW–VDK Cyclingteam is a Dutch UCI Continental cycling team founded in 2019. The team upgraded from club to Continental status in 2022.

== Team roster ==
As of 26 May 2023.

Rider	Date of birth
Elmar Abma (NED)	26 April 2004 (age 22)
Tim Bierkens (NED)	9 November 1999 (age 26)
Marien Bogerd (NED)	3 April 1994 (age 32)
Mike Bronswijk (NED)	18 January 2003 (age 23)
Sam Gademan (NED)	2 August 2000 (age 26)
Robin Löwik (NED)	30 May 1995 (age 31)
Rick Ottema (NED)	25 June 1992 (age 34)
Aden Paterson (AUS)	22 December 1998 (age 27)

Rider	Date of birth
Arne Peters (NED)	23 October 1995 (age 30)
Lars Rouffaer (NED)	16 November 2003 (age 22)
Jasper Schouten (NED)	20 November 1993 (age 32)
Wouter van de Weerdhof (NED)	6 October 2002 (age 23)
Dennis van der Horst (NED)	11 January 1998 (age 28)
Pepijn Veenings (NED)	2 April 2004 (age 22)
Mike Vliek (NED)	14 July 2000 (age 26)
Nils Wolfenbuttel (NED)	26 May 1996 (age 30)

== Major wins ==
2022
Stage 1 (TTT) Olympia's Tour
Stage 3 Course de la Solidarité Olympique, Tim Bierkens
