= Indulis Bekmanis =

Latvian professional road cyclist

Personal information
- Born: 21 February 1989 (age 37) Sigulda, Latvian SSR

Cycling career
- Sport: Cycling
- Discipline: Road
- Role: Rider

Professional teams
- 2008: Rietumu Banka–Riga
- 2010: ISD Continental Team
- 2011: La Pomme Marseille
- 2012: Rietumu–Delfin
- 2013–2014: Alpha Baltic–Unitymarathons.com

Indulis Bekmanis (born 21 February 1989) is a Latvian professional road cyclist who last rode for Alpha Baltic–Unitymarathons.com.

== Major results ==
2009
1st National U-23 Time Trial Championships
2010
1st National U-23 Road Race Championships
1st National U-23 Time Trial Championships
3rd National Road Race Championships
5th Memoriał Henryka Łasaka
7th Tartu GP
2011
3rd National U-23 Time Trial Championships
8th Overall Baltic Chain Tour

1st Stage 2

2012
3rd National Road Race Championships
7th Overall Baltic Chain Tour
8th Tartu GP
9th Mayor Cup
2013
4th Overall Baltic Chain Tour
