= Team Halfords (men's team) =

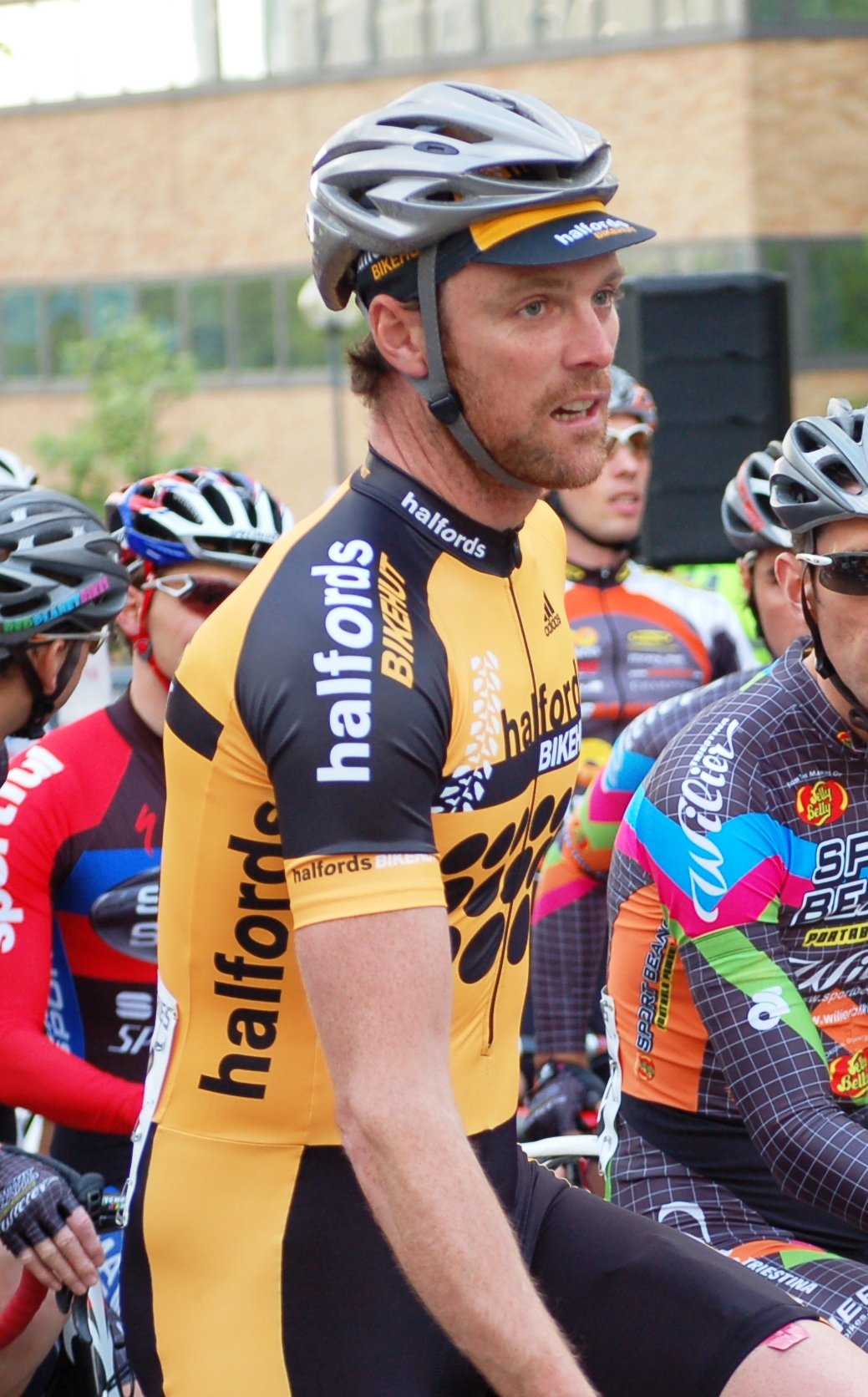
- Rob Hayles riding for the team.

Team information
- UCI code: HAF
- Registered: United Kingdom
- Founded: 2009
- Disbanded: 2009
- Disciplines: Road, cyclo-cross
- Status: UCI Continental
- Bicycles: Boardman

Key personnel
- Team manager: Keith Lambert

Team name history
- 2009: Team Halfords

Team Halfords was a British UCI Continental cycling team that existed only for the 2009 season.

== Major wins ==
2009
East Midlands International CiCLE Classic, Ian Wilkinson
Stage 2 FBD Insurance Rás, Ian Wilkinson
