= Dean Windsor =

Australian professional racing cyclist (born 1986)

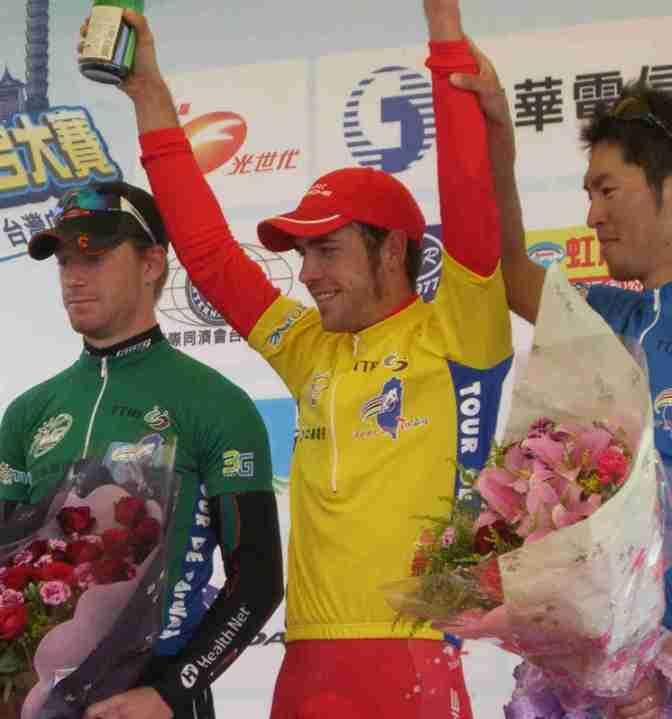
- Windsor in Leaders Yellow Jersey Tour de Taiwan

Personal information
- Full name: Dean Windsor
- Nickname: The Duke
- Born: 9 September 1986 (age 40) Bathurst, New South Wales, Australia

Cycling career
- Sport: Cycling
- Current team: Endura Racing
- Discipline: Road Racing
- Role: Professional Rider
- Rider type: Criterium & Road

Professional teams
- 2006-2009: Drapac–Porsche
- 2010-2011: Rapha Condor–Sharp
- 2012: Endura Racing

Dean Windsor (born 9 September 1986 in Bathurst, New South Wales, Australia) is an Australian professional racing cyclist who is known internationally as a criterium rider. Riding on the Track as a junior Dean Windsor won the Under19 Oceania Points Race Championship at Wanganui, NZ in 2004. Then focused on Road Racing winning the National U23 Criterium Championship, in 2007 at Brisbane. Then in 2010 was runner-up in the Australian Elite Criterium Championship at Ballarat. In 2011 he was runner-up in the British Elite Circuit Series behind then Rapha Condor-Sharp Team mate Dean Downing which included a win in the Stafford GP.

Outside of racing, Windsor is a qualified primary school teacher having studied primary education at Charles Sturt University.

== Career highlights ==
2006
3rd Stage 4 Tour of Wellington, Pahiatua (NZL)
2nd Stage 1 Tour of Gippsland, Mallacoota (Aus)
3rd Stage 5 Tour of Gippsland, Metung (Aus)
2nd Stage 6 Tour of Gippsland, Bairnsdale (Aus)
2007
1st Stage 4 Jayco Bay Cycling Classic, Geelong (Aus)
2nd Stage 3 Tour de Taiwan, Chiayi (TPE)
3rd Stage 5 Tour de Taiwan, Taichung (TPE)
2008
1st Points Jersey Classification Jayco Bay Cycling Classic,(Aus)
2009
2nd Stage 1 Jayco Bay Cycling Classic, Williamstown (Aus)
2nd Stage 3 Jayco Bay Cycling Classic, Geelong (Aus)
1st Points Jersey Classification Jayco Bay Cycling Classic,(Aus)
2nd Stage 3 Tour de Taiwan, Taichung City (TPE)
3rd Stage 5 Tour de Taiwan, Taichung (TPE)
6th Melle GP (Bel)
3rd Stage 3 Tour de Hokkaido, Toyotomi (JPN)
2010
2nd National Elite Criterium Championship, Ballarat (Aus)
3rd Stage 7 Tour de Taiwan, Taipei (TPE)
1st Stage 4 Irish Sea Tour of the North, Ballymena (IRL)
2nd Shay Elliott Memorial Race (IRL)
3rd Elite Circuit Series (GBR)
2nd Newport Nocturne

2011
2nd OCBC Singapore Criterium (SIN)
3rd Stage 8 Tour of Ireland, Skerries (IRL)
2nd Elite Circuit Series (GBR)
2012
2nd Stage 3 Settimana internazionale di Coppi e Bartali (ITA)
