= Jarosław Kowalczyk =

Polish cyclist

Personal information
- Full name: Jarosław Kowalczyk
- Born: 23 April 1989 (age 37) Poland

Cycling career
- Sport: Cycling
- Current team: Retired
- Discipline: Road
- Role: Rider

Amateur teams
- 2006–2008: TKK Pacific Toruń
- 2009: Casati–NGC–Perrel
- 2011: GKS Cartusia Kartuzy

Professional teams
- 2010: Aktio Group Mostostal Puławy
- 2012–2014: BDC–Marcpol Team

Jarosław Kowalczyk (born 23 April 1989) is a Polish former racing cyclist, who rode professionally between 2010 and 2014 for the Aktio Group Mostostal Puławy and BDC Marcpol teams, including competing at the 2014 UCI Road World Championships. After his retirement from cycling, Kowalczyk became director of the Pelplińskie Centrum Sportu in Pelplin, Poland.

== Major results ==
2010
3rd Road race, National Under-23 Road Championships
2011
1st Stage 4 Dookoła Mazowsza
3rd Overall Carpathia Couriers Paths
2012
1st Stage 3 Dookoła Mazowsza
2013
6th Overall Dookoła Mazowsza

1st Stage 4 (TTT)

10th Overall Tour du Maroc
10th Overall Tour de Serbie
2014
1st Overall Tour de Serbie

1st Stage 2

6th Overall Dookoła Mazowsza
6th Memoriał Andrzeja Trochanowskiego
