= Viktor Shmalko =

Russian bicycle racer

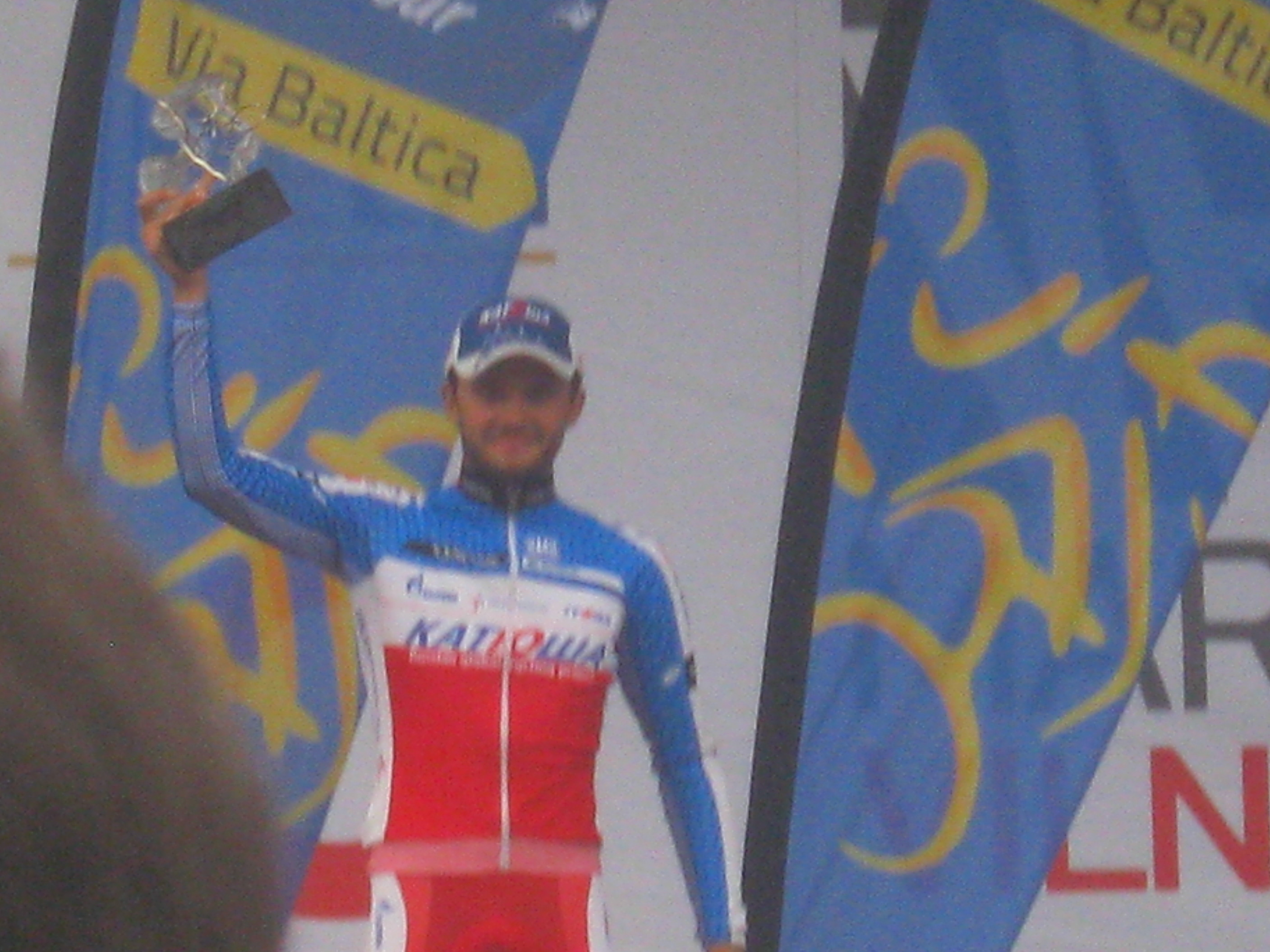
- Shmalko at the 2012 Baltic Chain Tour, where he finished 2nd.

Personal information
- Born: 9 July 1990 (age 36) Samara, Russia

Cycling career
- Sport: Cycling
- Disciplines: Road; Track
- Role: Rider

Professional teams
- 2009–2010: Katyusha Continental Team
- 2011: Itera–Katusha
- 2013: Itera–Katusha

Viktor Shmalko (born 9 July 1990) is a Russian former road and track cyclist. He competed in the scratch event at the 2010 UCI Track Cycling World Championships.

== Major results ==
2008
2nd Team pursuit, UCI Junior Track World Championships
2009
UCI Track World Cup

3rd Scratch, Melbourne

2010
National Track Championships

1st Team pursuit
1st Scratch

2011
3rd Scratch, European Under-23 Track Championships
3rd Madison, National Track Championships
2012
2nd Overall Baltic Chain Tour
2nd Points race, National Track Championships
