= Marcus Fåglum =

Swedish bicycle racer

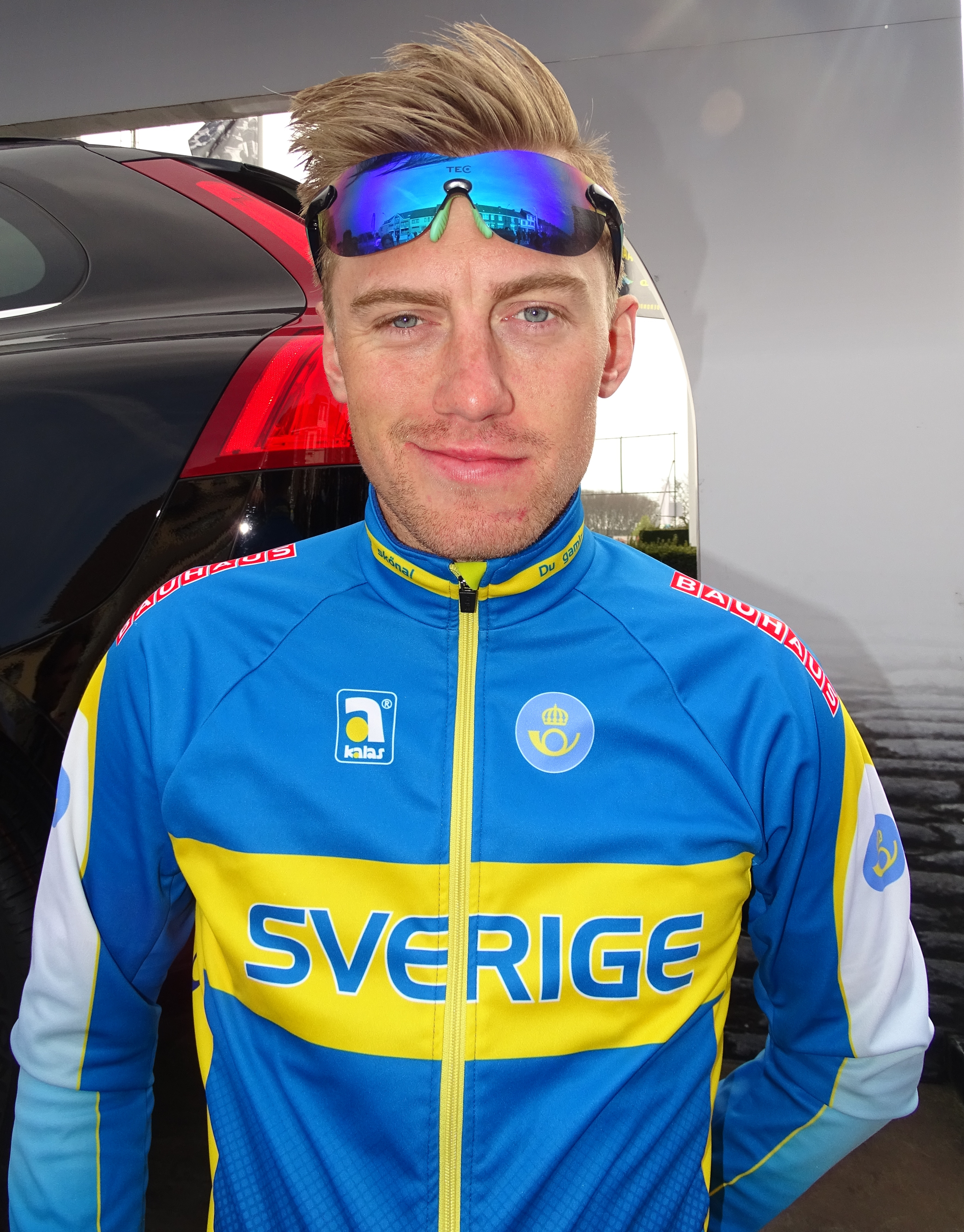
- Fåglum at the 2016 Ronde van Vlaanderen U23

Personal information
- Full name: Marcus Fåglum Karlsson
- Born: 20 July 1994 (age 32) Falköping, Sweden

Cycling career
- Sport: Cycling
- Current team: Retired
- Discipline: Road
- Role: Rider

Amateur teams
- 2010–2013: Falköping CK
- 2018: Motala AIF CK

Professional teams
- 2014: Team Ringeriks–Kraft
- 2015–2017: Team Tre Berg–Bianchi

Marcus Fåglum Karlsson (born 20 July 1994) is a Swedish former cyclist, who rode professionally between 2014 and 2017 for the Team Ringeriks–Kraft and Team Tre Berg–PostNord teams. He is the son of Jan Karlsson and grandson of Sture Pettersson.

== Major results ==
2011
National Junior Road Championships

1st Road race
1st Time trial

4th Time trial, UCI Junior Road World Championships
2012
National Junior Road Championships

1st Time trial
2nd Road race

4th Overall Niedersachsen-Rundfahrt
UEC European Junior Road Championships

5th Time trial
7th Road race

5th Overall Trofeo Karlsberg
2013
1st Time trial, National Under-23 Road Championships
2014
National Road Championships

3rd Road race
3rd Time trial

10th Time trial, UEC European Under-23 Road Championships
2015
2nd Road race, National Under-23 Road Championships
2016
1st Mountains classification Olympia's Tour
National Under-23 Road Championships

2nd Road race
2nd Time trial

3rd Ringerike GP
2017
7th Overall International Tour of Rhodes
