= Alpha Baltic Media =

Latvian media communications agency

- Trade name: Alpha / Alpha Agency
- Type: Private
- Industry: Advertising
- Founded: 2008; 18 years ago
- Headquarters: Riga, Latvia
- Key people: Lauris Špillers (board member)
- Owner: AlphaAgency OÜ
- Website: alphabaltic.com/en

Alpha Baltic Media (Alpha or Alpha Agency) is a Latvian advertising, media and communications agency headquartered in Riga. Established in 2008, the company provides advertising, media planning, branding, digital marketing and public relations services. Established in 2008, the company provides advertising, media planning, branding, digital marketing and public relations services.

Alpha Baltic Media has offices in several European and Asian cities, including Riga, Tallinn, Vilnius, Warsaw, London, Bangkok and Hong Kong, and maintains representative locations in other international markets.

== History ==
The Alpha brand was established in 1994, while SIA Alpha Baltic Media was incorporated in Latvia on 16 May 2008.

The company operated under the name Online Expo until August 2016, then as Alpha Baltic Creative, adopting the name Alpha Baltic Media in January 2017. Since October 2021 it has been owned by the Estonian company AlphaAgency OÜ, registered in Tallinn in 2021, whose board member and sole shareholder is Lauris Špillers.

In 2015 the agency reported that it had been ranked third among fourteen Latvian media agencies evaluated in RECMA's Overall Activity Rankings for 2013, with a market share of 8.5 per cent. Between 2011 and 2016 the agency was the title sponsor of the Latvian UCI Continental Circuits cycling team Alpha Baltic–Maratoni.lv.

In 2026, the agency received a bronze award in the Media category at the WINA World Independent Advertising Awards for its Brainstorm Recommends: Once Upon a Time in Pärnu campaign.

== Operations ==
In Latvia, the agency operates through SIA Alpha Baltic Media, led by board member Lauris Špillers. It provides communications services to private- and public-sector organisations, including several Latvian government agencies. Public procurement records list the agency’s work on public-awareness campaigns, media placement and sporting events. In 2026, a consortium involving Alpha Baltic Media and Dentsu Latvia received a contract for a Latvian National Armed Forces recruitment campaign.

The agency has provided media placement services across Europe and organised sporting events, including the Jūrmala Running Festival. In 2026, it joined Dentsu Latvia in a consortium awarded a Latvian National Armed Forces recruitment campaign contract.

Other projects have included the Never Alone! child-safety campaign for Findmykids in Lithuania and a 2025 tourism campaign for Visit Pärnu featuring the Latvian band Brainstorm. The agency began working with Destination Pärnu in 2023.
