= Rick Ottema =

Dutch cyclist

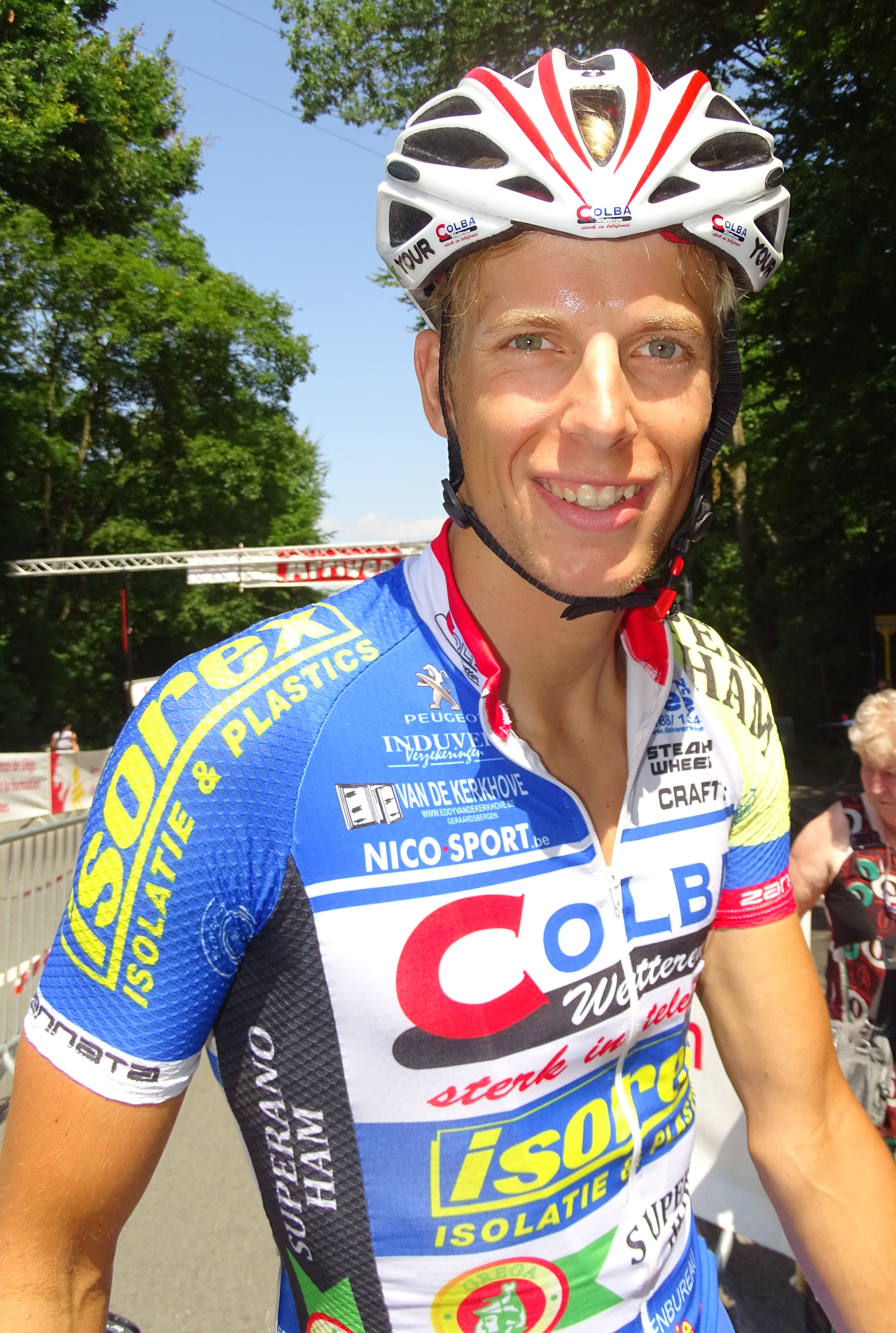
- Ottema in 2015

Personal information
- Full name: Rick Ottema
- Born: 25 June 1992 (age 34) Groningen, Netherlands
- Height: 1.9 m (6 ft 3 in)
- Weight: 77 kg (170 lb)

Cycling career
- Sport: Cycling
- Current team: EEW–VDK Cyclingteam
- Discipline: Road
- Role: Rider
- Rider type: Sprinter

Professional teams
- 2011–2013: Cycling Team De Rijke
- 2014: Veranclassic–Doltcini
- 2015: Colba–Superano Ham
- 2016–2018: Baby-Dump Cyclingteam
- 2019–2022: Metec–TKH
- 2023–: Allinq Continental Cycling Team

Rick Ottema (born 25 June 1992 in Groningen) is a Dutch cyclist, who currently rides for UCI Continental team EEW–VDK Cyclingteam.

== Major results ==
2010
1st Stage 2 (TTT) Liège–La Gleize
8th Paris–Roubaix Juniors
2011
8th Rogaland GP
2012
9th Omloop der Kempen
2015
10th Zuid Oost Drenthe Classic I
2016
5th Ronde van Overijssel
2017
1st ZODC Zuidenveld Tour
1st Mountains classification, Tour du Loir-et-Cher
2018
4th Dwars door de Vlaamse Ardennen
6th Ronde van Drenthe
2019
7th Memorial Rik Van Steenbergen
2020
1st Mountains classification, Bałtyk–Karkonosze Tour
2022
5th Overall Tour du Loir-et-Cher

1st Mountains classification
1st Stage 5

5th Overall Olympia's Tour
5th Overall Okolo Jižních Čech
6th PWZ Zuidenveld Tour
9th Ronde van Drenthe
2023
1st Omloop van de Houtse Linies
2nd Omloop van de Braakman
7th Ronde van Overijssel
7th Ster van Zwolle
9th Visit Friesland Elfsteden Race
2025
6th Overall Tour of Holland
