= Damian Walczak =

Polish cyclist

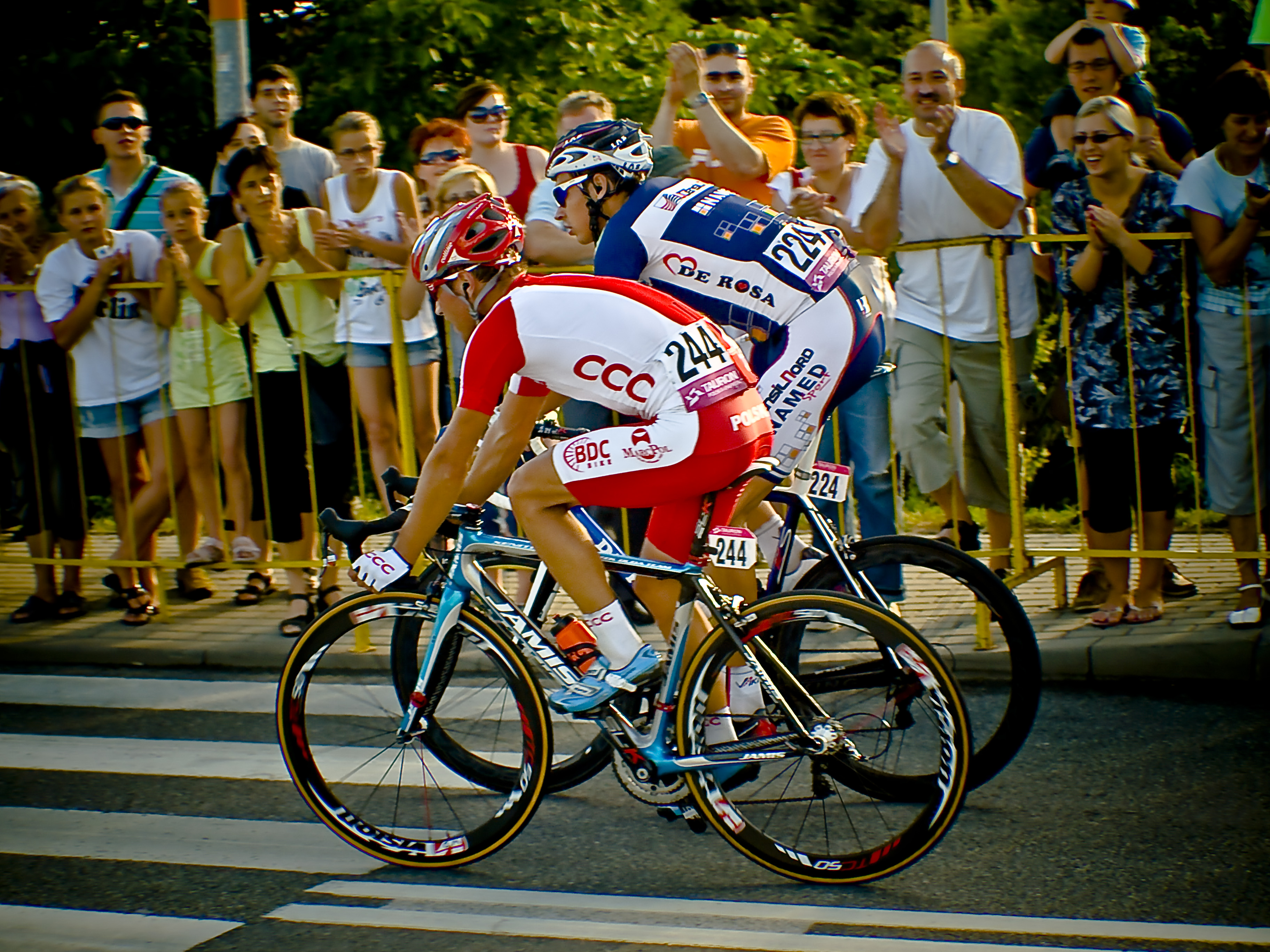

Personal information
- Born: 28 July 1984 (age 42)

Cycling career
- Sport: Cycling
- Discipline: Road
- Role: Rider

Professional teams
- 2005: Knauf Team
- 2009: DHL–Author
- 2012–2013: BDC–Marcpol Team

Damian Walczak (born 29 July 1984) is a Polish cyclist.

== Palmares ==
2008
1st GP San Giuseppe
2012
1st Puchar Ministra Obrony Narodowej
1st Stage 3 Tour of Bulgaria
