= Andris Smirnovs =

Latvian bicycle racer

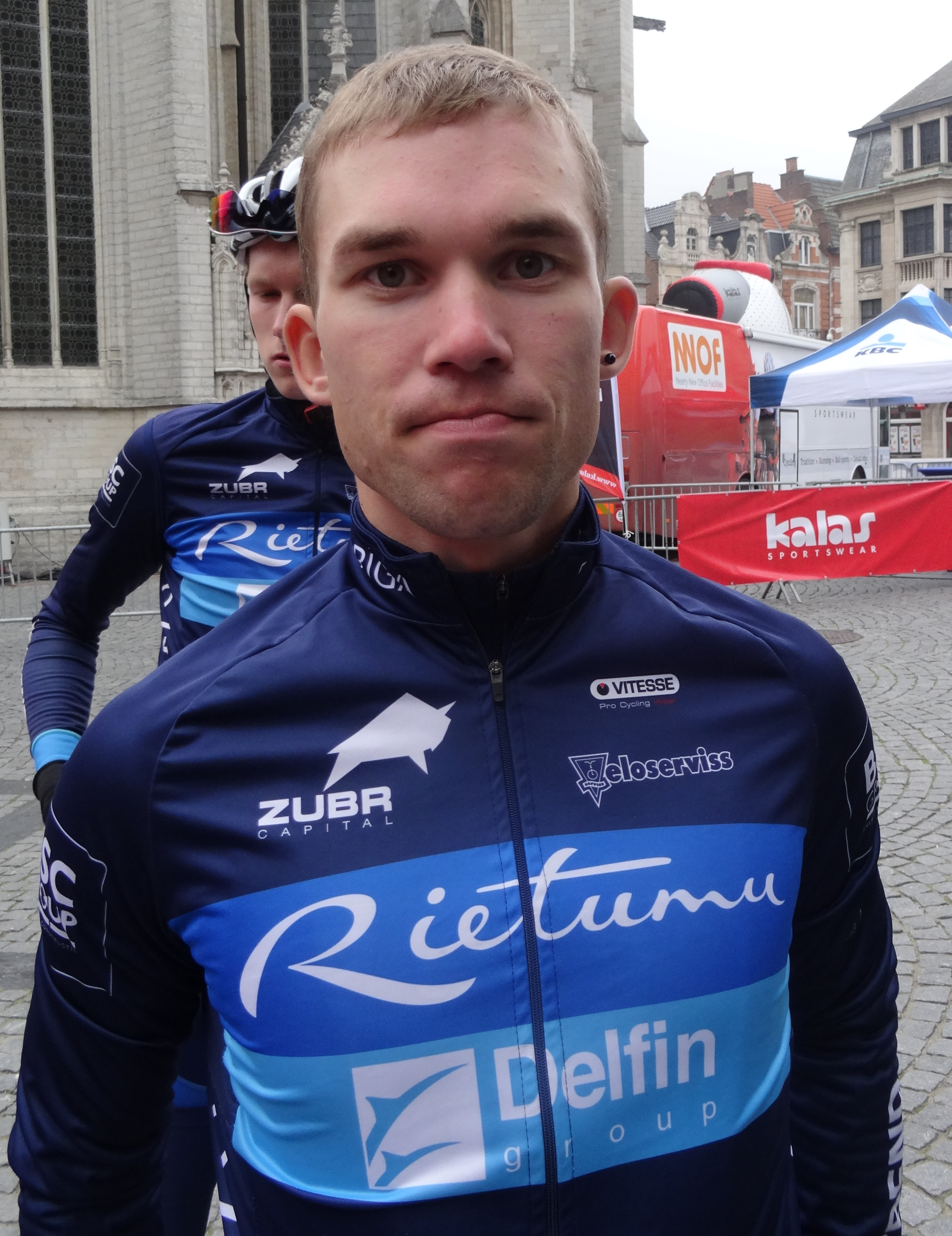
- Smirnovs in 2014.

Personal information
- Born: 6 February 1990 (age 36) Latvia
- Height: 175 cm (5 ft 9 in)
- Weight: 68 kg (150 lb)

Cycling career
- Sport: Cycling
- Current team: Retired
- Discipline: Road
- Role: Rider

Professional teams
- 2012: Rietumu–Delfin
- 2013: Doltcini Flanders
- 2013–2015: Rietumu–Delfin
- 2016: Alpha Baltic–Maratoni.lv

Andris Smirnovs (born 6 February 1990) is a Latvian former professional cyclist.

== Major results ==
2010
3rd Riga Grand Prix
2011
1st Central European Tour Budapest GP
1st Kernen Omloop Echt-Susteren
7th Scandinavian Race Uppsala
8th Overall Carpathia Couriers Paths
8th Ronde van Vlaanderen U23
8th Mayor Cup
10th Road race, UCI Under-23 Road World Championships
2012
1st GP Oued Eddahab, Les Challenges de la Marche Verte
3rd Time trial, National Under-23 Road Championships
4th Circuit d'Alger
8th Road race, UEC European Under-23 Road Championships
8th Overall Tour d'Algérie
8th Ronde van Vlaanderen U23
10th Overall Okolo Jižních Čech
2013
1st Stage 6 Baltic Chain Tour
3rd Grand Prix Pino Cerami
5th Skive–Løbet
5th Tour of Almaty
2014
2nd Mayor Cup
3rd Grand Prix of Moscow
4th Overall Tour of Estonia
2015
3rd Road race, National Road Championships
6th Moscow Cup
7th Clássica Loulé
8th Ronde van Noord-Holland
9th Overall Tour of Borneo
10th Overall GP Internacional do Guadiana
10th Overall Tour of Estonia
2016
2nd Grand Prix Minsk
