= Žydrūnas Savickas (cyclist) =

Lithuanian cyclist (born 1991)

Personal information
- Full name: Žydrūnas Savickas
- Born: 28 April 1991 (age 35) Lithuania

Cycling career
- Sport: Cycling
- Current team: Retired
- Discipline: Road
- Role: Rider

Amateur teams
- 2009: Alytaus SRC
- 2010: Chambéry CC
- 2011: VC Dolois
- 2012–2018: Bourg-en-Bresse Ain

Žydrūnas Savickas (born 28 April 1991) is a Lithuanian former racing cyclist. He rode at the 2014 and the 2015 UCI Road World Championships.

== Major results ==
2013
1st Time trial, National Under-23 Road Championships
3rd Overall Baltic Chain Tour
2014
7th Overall Baltic Chain Tour
2015
4th Minsk Cup
2017
3rd Overall Tour de Guadeloupe
2018
10th Overall Tour du Jura
