= Lithuanian Cycling Federation =

National governing body of cycle racing in Lithuania

The Lithuanian Cycling Federation or LDSF (Lithuanian: Lietuvos Dviračių Sporto Federacija) is the national governing body of cycle racing in Lithuania.

The LDSF is a member of the UCI and the UEC.
