= Paavo Paajanen =

Finnish cyclist

Personal information
- Full name: Paavo Paajanen
- Born: 25 April 1988 (age 38)

Cycling career
- Sport: Cycling
- Role: Rider

Paavo Paajanen (born 25 April 1988) is a Finnish former racing cyclist. He finished in second place in the Finnish National Road Race Championships in 2011 and 2013.
