= Newport Nocturne =

Bicycle race in Shropshire, England

The Shropshire Star Newport Nocturne is Britain's first flood lit road bicycle race and is biennially held in Newport, Shropshire. The race was first run in 1970 at a distance of 109 miles (175 km). The race was first run as a night race under flood lights in 1989 and returned in 1990 and 1991 in this format. The economic recession of the early 1990s forced the event to be cancelled in 1992.

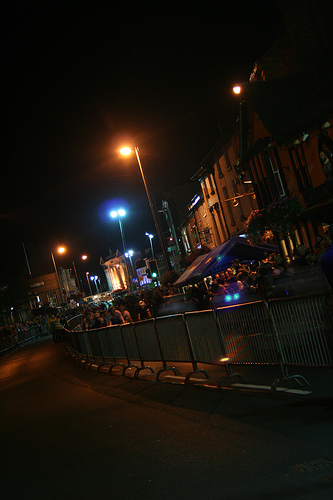
the High street

The race was brought back in 2001 at the request of the town council. Following the 2001 race, the Shropshire Star newspaper became title sponsor of the race. The 2003 edition attracted Sean Kelly as a guest and 14,000 spectators. The event was developed in 2005 with the addition of the "One Lap Challenge", specifically designed for track cyclists. In 2007, the event was made up of three races: the British Cycling Elite Circuit race, a past masters race and a showcase event involving British Tour de France riders Bradley Wiggins, Mark Cavendish and Geraint Thomas, along with Olympic medalist Rob Hayles.

== The track ==
The track follows the same route every year and starts off in the High Street, heading north towards St Nicolas' Church and around the church onto the cobblestones of St Mary's Street and around the other side of the church, coming back onto the other side of the High Street, heading up the other side of the High Street. The racers then turn left onto Avenue Road – a quiet, predominantly residential area. The racers then turn at the bowling club and head down Granville Avenue before going back on the High Street to the finishing line.

== Recent events ==
The 2010 Nocturne was held on 4 September 2010, with British cycling's leading female stars including Victoria Pendleton and Nicole Cooke turning up to compete. The 2014 event was held on 30 August so as to not conflict with other cycling events such as the Tour de Yorkshire. This would enable some of the top names in cycling to attend.
