= Baltic Chain Tour =

Cycling stage race

Race details
- Date: August
- Region: Northern Europe
- English name: Baltic Chain Tour
- Discipline: Road
- Competition: UCI Europe Tour
- Type: Stage race
- Web site: balticchaintour.com

History
- First edition: 1955
- Editions: 35 (as of 2026)
- First winner: Harijs Japiņš (LAT)
- Most wins: Ants Väravas (EST); Rait Ärm (EST) (3 wins)
- Most recent: Lauri Tamm (EST)

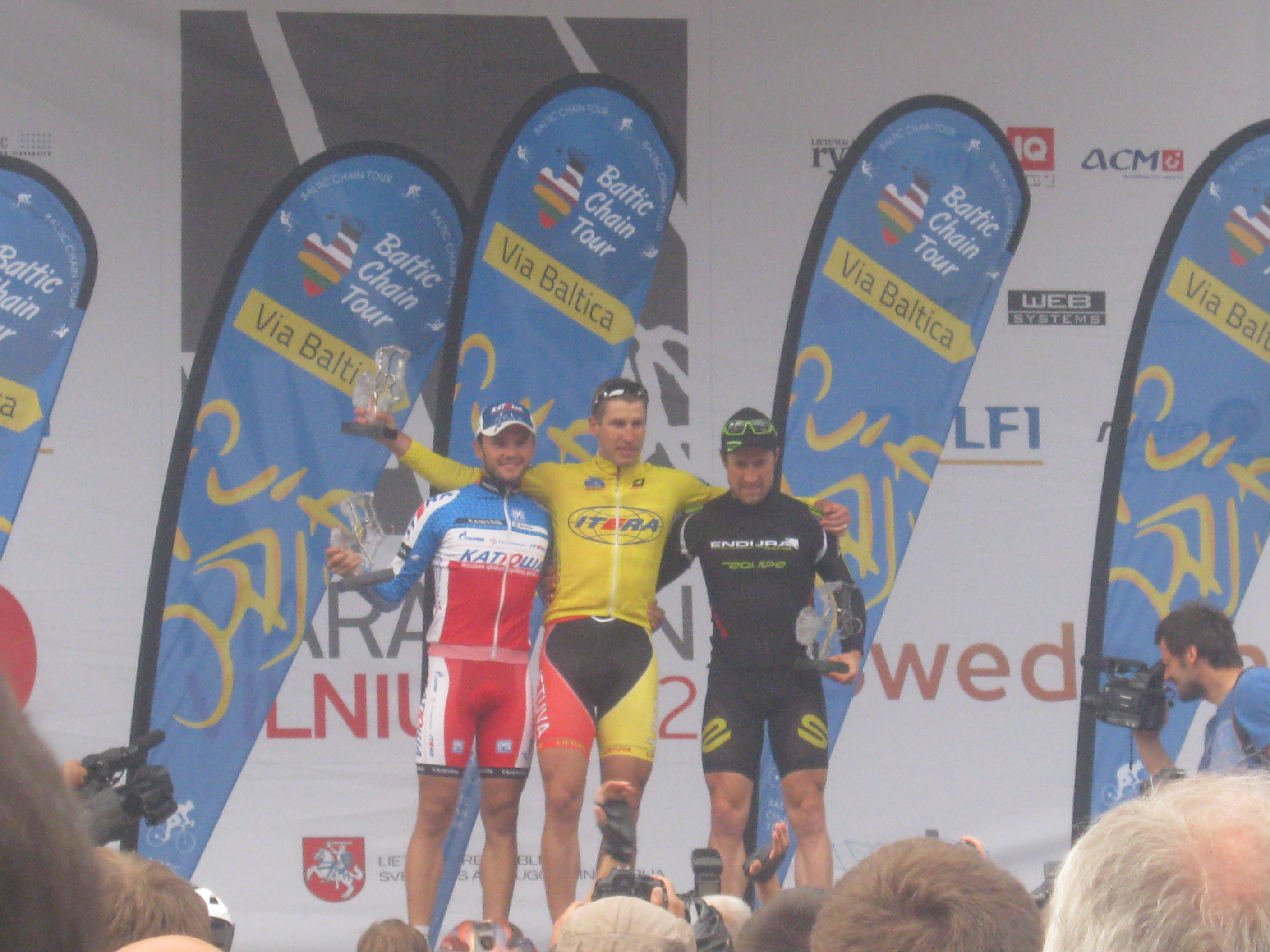
Baltic Chain Tour 2012 – top 3 overall.

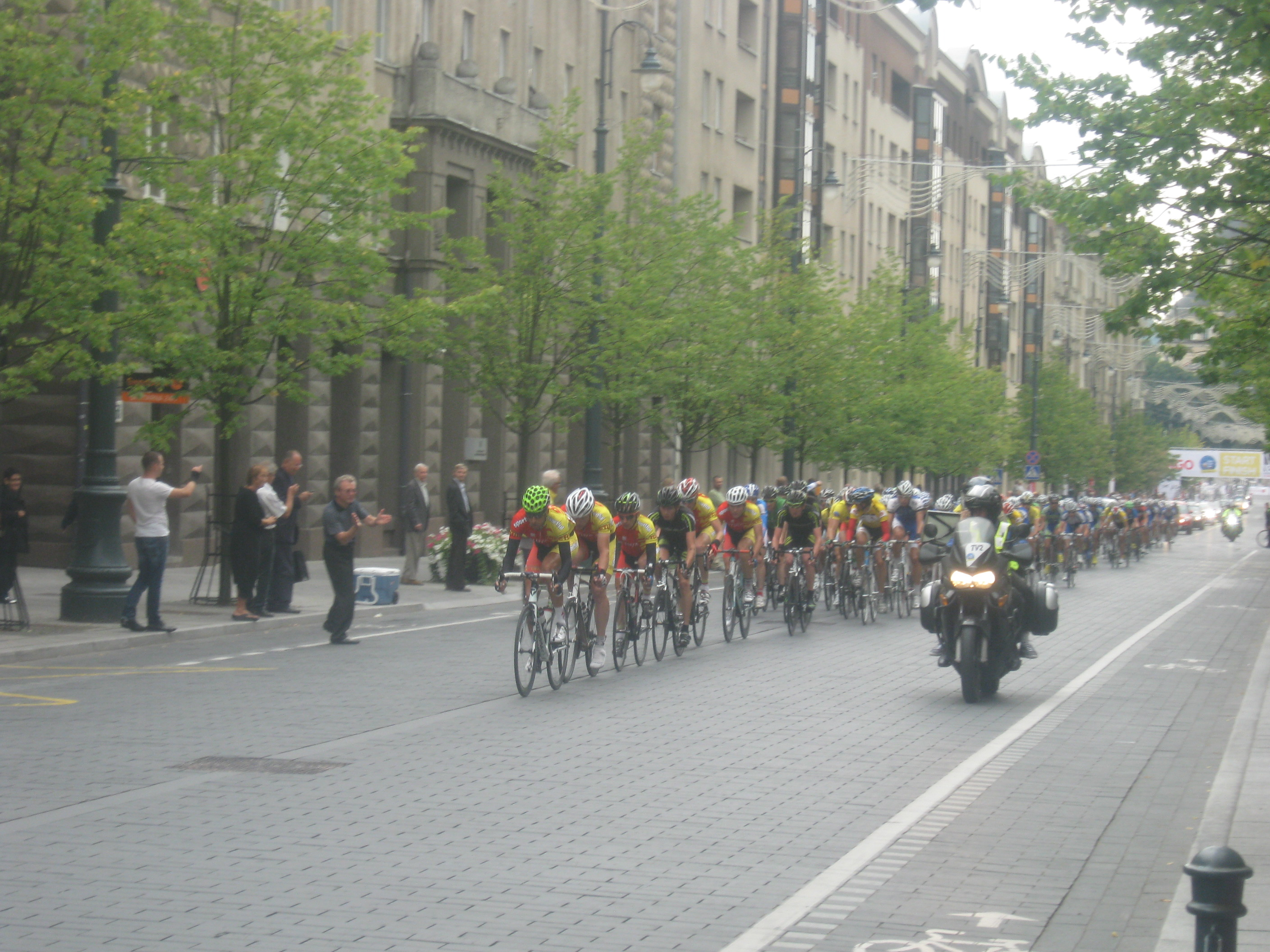
Baltic Chain Tour 2012 in Vilnius, Lithuania

Baltic Chain Tour is a stage race for professional road bicycle racers organized as a part of the UCI Continental Circuits. Baltic Chain Tour was established to commemorate Baltic Way. Tour is conducted mainly in the Baltic states of Estonia, Latvia and Lithuania, however in 2013 it started in Lahti, Finland. Baltic Chain Tour is a UCI category 2.2 cycling tour.

The joint Baltic cycling tour has a long history. The tradition began in the 1950s and was broken in 1987. On November 4, 2010, in Riga, the presidents of three national cycling unions signed a cooperation agreement to restore the tradition of the Baltic cycling tour.

== Origins ==
Although the first international cycling race in the Baltics was held in 1889 from Riga (Latvia) to Tallinn (Estonia), the first Baltic Tour was held in 1955. For its first four years the tour was held in Latvia and Lithuania. Since 1959 the tour has been held in three Baltic countries. For many, it was a preparation for the Peace Race, which usually was held after Baltic Tour. At the time, the tour took place in May. The modern tour is raced in August to commemorate the anniversary of the famous Baltic Way event in 1989. The current record holder for most wins is the Estonian Ants Väravas, who won the race three times – in 1959, 1962 and 1964.

== Results ==
=== Baltic Tour ===
Year	Country	Rider	Team
1955	Latvian SSR	Harijs Japiņš	Latvia
1956	Lithuanian SSR	Kazys Paršaitis	Cycling Team Dinamo
1957	Lithuanian SSR	Bronius Krulikauskas	Lithuania
1958	Lithuanian SSR	Bronius Krulikauskas	Lithuania
1959	Estonian SSR	Ants Väravas	Estonia
1960	Estonian SSR	Rein Leegu	Estonia
1961	Latvian SSR	Aleksandrovs Pavlovs	ASK Rīga
1962	Estonian SSR	Ants Väravas	Estonia
1963	Lithuanian SSR	Juozas Grabauskas	Lithuania
1964	Estonian SSR	Ants Väravas	Estonia
1972	Lithuanian SSR	Vytautas Berankis	Lithuania
1973	Lithuanian SSR	Vytautas Paškauskas	Lithuania
1974	Latvian SSR	Ringolds Kalnienieks	Latvia
1975	Latvian SSR	Andris Jēkabsons	Latvia
1976	Latvian SSR	Andris Jēkabsons	Latvia
1978	Latvian SSR	Andris Sarkanis	Latvia
1979	Latvian SSR	Arnis Bergs	Latvia
1980	Bulgaria	A. Mironov	Bulgaria
1981	Estonian SSR	Jaan Veeranna	Estonia
1986	Latvian SSR	Ēriks Feldmanis	Latvia
1987	Estonian SSR	Aivar Murd	Estonia

=== Baltic Chain Tour ===
Year	Country	Rider	Team
2011	Estonia	Erki Pütsep	Alpha Baltic–Unitymarathons.com
2012	Lithuania	Gediminas Bagdonas	Lithuania national team
2013	Germany	Philipp Walsleben	BKCP–Powerplus
2014	Netherlands	Mathieu van der Poel	BKCP–Powerplus
2015	Ukraine	Andriy Kulyk	Kolss BDC Team
2016	Latvia	Māris Bogdanovičs	Rietumu–Delfin
2017	Norway	Herman Dahl	Team Sparebanken Sør
2018	Latvia	Emīls Liepiņš	ONE Pro Cycling
2020	Estonia	Gert Jõeäär	Estonia (national team)
2021	New Zealand	Laurence Pithie	Équipe Continentale Groupama–FDJ
2022	Estonia	Rait Ärm	Estonia (national team)
2023	Estonia	Rait Ärm	Estonia (national team)
2024	No race		
2025	Estonia	Rait Ärm	Estonia (national team)
2026	Estonia	Lauri Tamm	Estonia (national team)
