= BDC Marcpol =

Polish cycling team

Team information
- UCI code: BDC
- Registered: Poland
- Founded: 2011
- Disbanded: 2014
- Discipline: Road
- Status: UCI Continental
- Bicycles: Jamis (2012–2013); Merida (2014)

Key personnel
- General manager: Dariusz Banaszek

Team name history
- 2011 2012–2013 2014: BDC Team; BDC–Marcpol Team; BDC Marcpol

BDC Marcpol was a Polish UCI Continental cycling team.

== Major wins ==
2011
Overall Dookoła Mazowsza, Robert Radosz
2012
Puchar Ministra Obrony Narodowej, Damian Walczak
2013
Overall Memoriał Andrzeja Trochanowskiego, Konrad Dąbkowski
Overall Dookoła Mazowsza, Marcin Sapa
2014
Overall Memoriał Andrzeja Trochanowskiego, Kamil Gradek
Visegrad 4 Bicycle Race-GP Slovakia, Paweł Bernas
Visegrad 4 Bicycle Race-GP Hungary, Paweł Bernas
Overall Tour de Serbie, Jarosław Kowalczyk

Stage 2, Jarosław Kowalczyk

Memorial im. J. Grundmanna J. Wizowskiego, Błażej Janiaczyk
Stage 2 Course de la Solidarité Olympique, Kamil Gradek
Stage 6 Dookoła Mazowsza, Eryk Laton
Overall Tour of China I, Kamil Gradek

Stage 1, Paweł Bernas
Stage 3, Kamil Gradek
