= Alpha Baltic–Maratoni.lv =

Latvian cycling team

Alpha Baltic–Unitymarathons.com
Team information
- UCI code: ALB
- Registered: Latvia
- Founded: 2011
- Disbanded: 2016
- Discipline: Road

Key personnel
- Team manager: Kaspars Tupiņš

Alpha Baltic–Unitymarathons.com (UCI team code: ALB) was a Latvian road cycling team. Since 2011 it is a UCI Continental team. Between 2011 and 2016 Alpha Baltic was its title sponsor. Between 2011 and 2013 the leading cyclist of the team was Estonian cyclist Erki Pütsep.

== Major wins ==
2011
Overall Baltic Chain Tour, Erki Pütsep
Team classification Baltic Chain Tour

== Team roster ==
As of 24 June 2014.

Rider	Date of birth
Ansis Brēmanis (LAT)	15 February 1994 (age 32)
Indulis Bekmanis (LAT)	21 February 1989 (age 37)
Marius Bernatonis (LTU)	1 May 1987 (age 39)
Māris Bogdanovičs (LAT)	19 November 1991 (age 34)
Sandis Eislers (LAT)	2 July 1993 (age 33)
Ingus Eislers (LAT)	28 January 1989 (age 37)

Rider	Date of birth
Deins Kanepejs (LAT)	5 October 1995 (age 30)
Vitālijs Korņilovs (LAT)	17 July 1979 (age 47)
Mārtiņš Savickis (LAT)	3 January 1993 (age 33)
Kaspars Serģis (LAT)	12 June 1992 (age 34)
Lauris Špillers (LAT)	19 February 1974 (age 52)
Arnis Zecmanis (LAT)	5 April 1995 (age 31)
