= 2008 UCI Road World Championships – Men's road race =

Men's Individual Road Race
2008 UCI Road World Championships
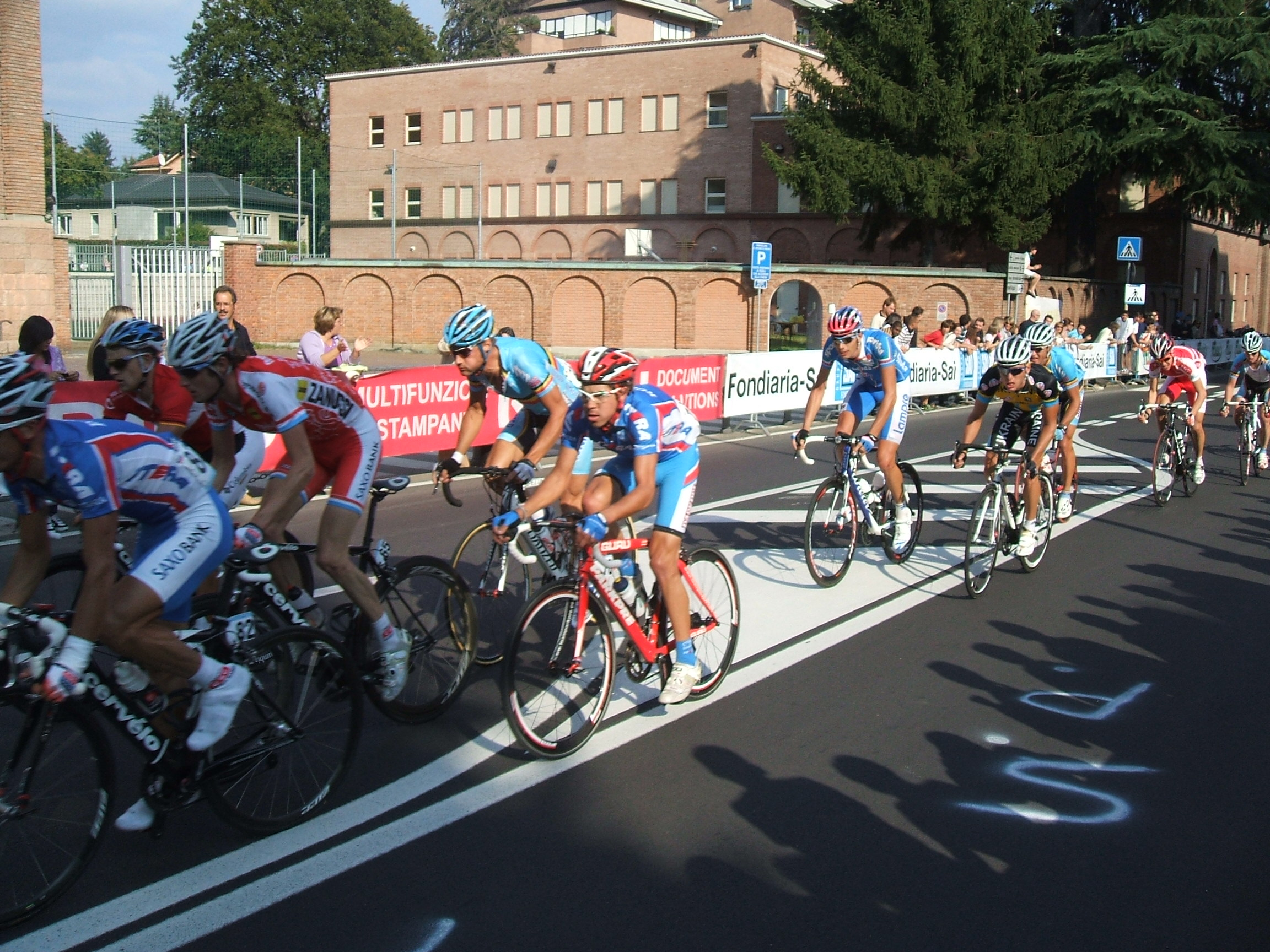
- The peloton during the race

Race details
- Dates: September 28, 2008
- Stages: 1
- Distance: 260.25 km (161.7 mi)
- Winning time: 6h 37' 30"

Medalists
	Gold	Alessandro Ballan (ITA)	(Italy)
	Silver	Damiano Cunego (ITA)	(Italy)
	Bronze	Matti Breschel (DEN)	(Denmark)

The Men's Individual Road Race of the 2008 UCI Road World Championships cycling event took place on September 28 in Varese, Italy. The course comprised 15 laps around 17.35-kilometre route, making a total distance of 260.25 km. Each lap featured two ascents: the first at Via Montello (6.5% gradient for 1.15 kilometres); and the second at Ronchi (4.5% for 3.13 kilometres). The highest elevation measured 480 metres (1,570 ft) at Via Montello.

Pre-race favourites included Paolo Bettini, who was trying for an unprecedented third consecutive title, and the 1999, 2001 and 2004 champion Óscar Freire.

The race was won by Alessandro Ballan, with his fellow Italian Damiano Cunego in second and Matti Breschel of Denmark taking the bronze medal.

== Final classification ==
Rank	Rider	Country	Time
1	Alessandro Ballan	Italy	6h 37'30"
1	Damiano Cunego	Italy	at 3"
1	Matti Breschel	Denmark	s.t.
4	Davide Rebellin	Italy	s.t.
5	Andriy Hrivko	Ukraine	s.t.
6	Joaquim Rodríguez	Spain	s.t.
7	Fabian Wegmann	Germany	s.t.
8	Christian Pfannberger	Austria	s.t.
9	Nick Nuyens	Belgium	s.t.
10	Robert Gesink	Netherlands	s.t.
11	Jurgen Van Goolen	Belgium	s.t.
12	Thomas Löfkvist	Sweden	s.t.
13	Chris Sørensen	Denmark	at 6"
14	Assan Bazayev	Kazakhstan	at 58"
15	Philippe Gilbert	Belgium	s.t.
16	Kristjan Fajt	Slovenia	at 1'01"
17	Greg Van Avermaet	Belgium	s.t.
18	Gorazd Štangelj	Slovenia	s.t.
19	Jérôme Pineau	France	at 1'13"
20	Vladimir Karpets	Russia	s.t.
21	Sérgio Paulinho	Portugal	s.t.
22	Samuel Sánchez	Spain	at 1'22"
23	Steven Cozza	United States	at 1'40"
24	Hrvoje Miholjević	Croatia	s.t.
25	Rubens Bertogliati	Switzerland	at 2'14"
26	Amaël Moinard	France	s.t.
27	Alexandre Bazhenov	Russia	at 3'24"
28	Paolo Bettini	Italy	at 4'53"
29	Erik Zabel	Germany	s.t.
30	Dimitry Muravyev	Kazakhstan	s.t.
31	Matteo Tosatto	Italy	s.t.
32	Alexander Efimkin	Russia	s.t.
33	Michael Barry	Canada	s.t.
34	Thomas Rohregger	Austria	s.t.
35	Julian Dean	New Zealand	s.t.
36	Janek Tombak	Estonia	s.t.
37	Alejandro Valverde	Spain	s.t.
38	Tom Boonen	Belgium	s.t.
39	Óscar Freire	Spain	s.t.

Rank	Rider	Country	Time
40	Gustav Larsson	Sweden	s.t.
41	Fränk Schleck	Luxembourg	s.t.
41	Sergey Lagutin	Uzbekistan	s.t.
43	Karsten Kroon	Netherlands	s.t.
44	Alexandr Kolobnev	Russia	s.t.
45	Nuno Ribeiro	Portugal	s.t.
46	John Gadret	France	s.t.
47	Stefan Schumacher	Germany	s.t.
48	Janez Brajkovič	Slovenia	s.t.
49	Russell Downing	Great Britain	s.t.
50	Oliver Zaugg	Switzerland	s.t.
51	Roman Kreuziger	Czech Republic	s.t.
52	Nicolas Vogondy	France	s.t.
53	Sylvain Chavanel	France	s.t.
54	Mikhaylo Khalilov	Ukraine	s.t.
55	Matthew Lloyd	Australia	s.t.
56	Vladimir Gusev	Russia	s.t.
57	Lars Petter Nordhaug	Norway	at 5'20"
58	José Mendes	Portugal	at 8'15"
59	Aleksejs Saramotins	Latvia	at 10'33"
60	Félix Cárdenas	Colombia	s.t.
61	Kjell Carlström	Finland	s.t.
62	Marcus Ljungqvist	Sweden	s.t.
63	Tyler Farrar	United States	s.t.
64	Borut Božič	Slovenia	s.t.
65	Frank Høj	Denmark	s.t.
66	Maarten Tjallingii	Netherlands	s.t.
67	Roman Klimov	Russia	at 10'54"
68	Hubert Krys	Poland	s.t.
69	Péter Kusztor	Hungary	s.t.
70	Carlos José Ochoa	Venezuela	s.t.
71	Geoffroy Lequatre	France	s.t.
72	Leonardo Duque	Colombia	s.t.
73	José Rujano	Venezuela	s.t.
74	Oleg Chuzhda	Ukraine	s.t.
75	Oļegs Meļehs	Latvia	at 11'01"
76	Lucas Euser	United States	at 22'49"
77	Yukiya Arashiro	Japan	at 22'50"

=== Did not finish ===
128 riders failed to finish the race. Levi Leipheimer of the United States did not start the race.

Rider	Country
Juan Manuel Gárate Cepa	Spain
Kevin De Weert	Belgium
Chris Froome	Great Britain
Gerald Ciolek	Germany
Kazuo Inoue	Japan
Stefan Hristov	Bulgaria
Juan Pablo Dotti	Argentina
Nebojša Jovanović	Serbia
Alexsandr Dyachenko	Kazakhstan
Stefan Rucker	Austria
Vladimir Zagorodniy	Ukraine
Grégory Rast	Switzerland
Stijn Devolder	Belgium
Bram Tankink	Netherlands
Mario Aerts	Belgium
Yaroslav Popovych	Ukraine
Benjamín Noval	Spain
Marzio Bruseghin	Italy
Andrea Tonti	Italy
Andy Schleck	Luxembourg
Alberto Contador	Spain
Christophe Le Mével	France
Ezequiel Mosquera	Spain
Danilo Wyss	Switzerland
Andreas Dietziker	Switzerland
Christian Knees	Germany
Michael Rogers	Australia
Martin Velits	Slovakia
Luca Paolini	Italy
André Greipel	Germany
Robbie McEwen	Australia
Nikita Eskov	Russia
David Loosli	Switzerland
Rein Taaramäe	Estonia
Jackson Rodríguez	Venezuela
Philip Deignan	Ireland
Daryl Impey	South Africa
Nelson Victorino	Portugal
Przemysław Niemiec	Poland
Christian Meier	Canada
Steven de Jongh	Netherlands
Marc de Maar	Netherlands
Koos Moerenhout	Netherlands
William Walker	Australia
Žolt Dér	Serbia
Sebastian Lang	Germany
Tom Stamsnijder	Netherlands
Marcus Burghardt	Germany
Vladimir Miholjević	Croatia
Edvald Boasson Hagen	Norway
Anders Lund	Denmark
Trent Lowe	Australia
Martin Mareš	Czech Republic
Sandy Casar	France
Maxime Monfort	Belgium
Steve Fogen	Luxembourg
Mauricio Soler	Colombia
Simon Gerrans	Australia
Allan Davis	Australia
Christian Poos	Luxembourg
Richard Ochoa	Venezuela
Peter Velits	Slovakia
Thomas Frei	Switzerland
Matej Stare	Slovenia

Rider	Country
Matija Kvasina	Croatia
Gabriele Bosisio	Italy
Evgeny Petrov	Russia
Dominique Rollin	Canada
Hidenori Nodera	Japan
Adam Hansen	Australia
František Raboň	Czech Republic
Christoff Van Heerden	South Africa
Jempy Drucker	Luxembourg
Jakob Fuglsang	Denmark
Maciej Bodnar	Poland
Richard Mascarañas	Uruguay
Vincenzo Centrone	Luxembourg
Muradjan Khalmuratov	Uzbekistan
Matthew Goss	Australia
Lars Ytting Bak	Denmark
David Millar	Great Britain
Benoît Joachim	Luxembourg
Manuel Medina	Venezuela
Sebastian Langeveld	Netherlands
Luis León Sánchez	Spain
Ignatas Konovalovas	Lithuania
Kevin Evans	South Africa
Geraint Thomas	Great Britain
Stephen Cummings	Great Britain
Martin Elmiger	Switzerland
Rodger Aiken	Ireland
David Zabriskie	United States
Stéphane Augé	France
Franklin Chacón	Venezuela
Markus Zberg	Switzerland
Dariusz Baranowski	Poland
Grega Bole	Slovenia
Rida Cador	Hungary
Gergely Ivanics	Hungary
Laurent Didier	Luxembourg
Darren Lill	South Africa
Brent Bookwalter	United States
Gerardo Fernández	Argentina
Yauheni Hutarovich	Belarus
Ruslan Podgornyy	Ukraine
Maroš Kováč	Slovakia
Erki Pütsep	Estonia
Kurt Asle Arvesen	Norway
Glen Chadwick	New Zealand
Ricardo Mestre	Portugal
Henry Raabe	Costa Rica
Luis Fernando Macías	Mexico
Normunds Lasis	Latvia
Robert Hunter	South Africa
Matti Helminen	Finland
Boris Shpilevsky	Russia
Krasimir Vasilev	Bulgaria
Dragan Spasic	Serbia
Ian Stannard	Great Britain
Claude Wolter	Luxembourg
David George	South Africa
Markus Fothen	Germany
Tiago Machado	Portugal
Nicolas Roche	Ireland
Vladimir Tuychiev	Uzbekistan
Łukasz Bodnar	Poland
Marek Rutkiewicz	Poland
Adil Jelloul	Morocco

== Nation qualification ==
14 to be enrolled, 9 to start
Spain
Italy
Belgium
Germany
Luxembourg
Australia
France
Switzerland
Russia
Netherlands
9 to be enrolled, 6 to start
South Africa
United States
Venezuela
Iran
Slovenia
Poland
Ukraine
Great Britain
Portugal
Denmark
5 to be enrolled, 3 to start
Tunisia
Argentina
Colombia
Canada
Japan
Uzbekistan
Austria
Sweden
Croatia
Ireland
Hungary
Bulgaria
Slovakia
Latvia
Serbia
Estonia
New Zealand
Czech Republic
Finland
Norway
Kazakhstan
2 to be enrolled, 1 to start
Morocco
Cuba
Costa Rica
Ecuador
Mexico
Uruguay
Belarus
Sri Lanka
Lithuania
