= 2007 UCI Road World Championships – Men's under-23 time trial =

Cycling race

The 2007 edition of the Men's Under-23 Time Trial World Championships took place on September 26. The Championships were hosted by the German city of Stuttgart, and featured two laps of an urban circuit, amounting to 38.1 kilometres of racing against the clock. Dutch rider Lars Boom won the gold medal as the 2007 Men's Under-23 World Time Trial Champion.

== Men's Under-23 general standings ==
=== 2007-09-26: Stuttgart, 38.1 km (ITT) ===
	Cyclist	Team	Final time	Time behind
Gold	Lars Boom	Netherlands	48:57.93	
Silver	Mikhail Ignatiev	Russia	49:05.99	+9.06
Bronze	Jérôme Coppel	France	49:43.52	+45.59
4	Michael Færk Christensen	Denmark	50:08.00	+1:10.07
5	Adriano Malori	Italy	50:09.97	+1:12.04
6	Edvald Boasson Hagen	Norway	50:11.17	+1:13.24
7	Tanel Kangert	Estonia	50:11.87	+1:13.94
8	Alexandre Pliușchin	Moldova	50:15.34	+1:17.41
9	Branislau Samoilau	Belarus	50:25.79	+1:27.86
10	Francis De Greef	Belgium	50:28.05	+1:30.12
11	Dmitri Sokolov	Russia		
12	Ignatas Konovalovas	Lithuania		
13	Jos van Emden	Netherlands		
14	Roman Kireyev	Kazakhstan		
15	Peter Velits	Slovakia		
16	Rein Taaramäe	Estonia		
17	David Veilleux	Canada		
17	Rafael Serrano	Spain		
18	Marcel Kittel	Germany		
19	Grega Bole	Slovenia		
20	Tony Gallopin	France		
21	Dmitriy Gruzdev	Kazakhstan		
22	André Steensen	Denmark		
23	Rafaâ Chtioui	Tunisia		
24	Stefan Schäfer	Germany		
25	Martin Kohler	Switzerland		
26	Rui Costa	Portugal		
27	Kristjan Koren	Slovenia		
28	Mathieu Deschenaux	Switzerland		
29	Oleg Chuzhda	Ukraine		
30	Maxim Belkov	Russia		
31	Martin Velits	Slovakia		
32	Sergiu Cioban	Moldova		
33	Jarosław Marycz	Poland		
35	Sam Bewley	New Zealand		
36	Ian Stannard	Great Britain		
37	Evaldas Šiškevičius	Lithuania		
38	Tejay van Garderen	United States		
39	Gatis Smukulis	Latvia		
40	José Mendes	Portugal		
41	Chris Froome	Kenya		
42	Jacques Janse van Rensburg	South Africa		
43	Siarhei Papok	Belarus		
44	Zakkari Dempster	Australia		
45	František Klouček	Czech Republic		
46	Emanuel Saldaño	Argentina		
47	Marco Coledan	Italy		
48	Christian Meier	Canada		
49	Pavel Zitta	Czech Republic		
50	Clinton Avery	New Zealand		
51	Krisztián Lovassy	Hungary		
52	Wilson Marentes	Colombia		
53	Mārtiņš Trautmanis	Latvia		
54	Darwin Urrea	Venezuela		
55	Abdelkader Belmokhtar	Algeria		
56	Hossein Nateghi	Iran		
57	Nick Frey	United States		
58	Andriy Suralyov	Ukraine		
59	Sergio Domínguez	Spain		
60	Dimitri Jiriakov	Liechtenstein		
61	Frederik Krogh-Larsen	Norway		
62	Esad Hasanović	Serbia		
63	Federico Pagani	Argentina		
64	Azizbek Abdvrahimov	Uzbekistan		
65	Víctor Moreno	Venezuela		
66	Mohd Fauzan Ahmad	Malaysia		
67	Mohammad Rajablou	Iran		
68	Yong Li Ng	Malaysia		
69	Konstantin Kalinin	Uzbekistan		
70	Sándor Koczka	Hungary		
