= Vitālijs Korņilovs =

Latvian cyclist

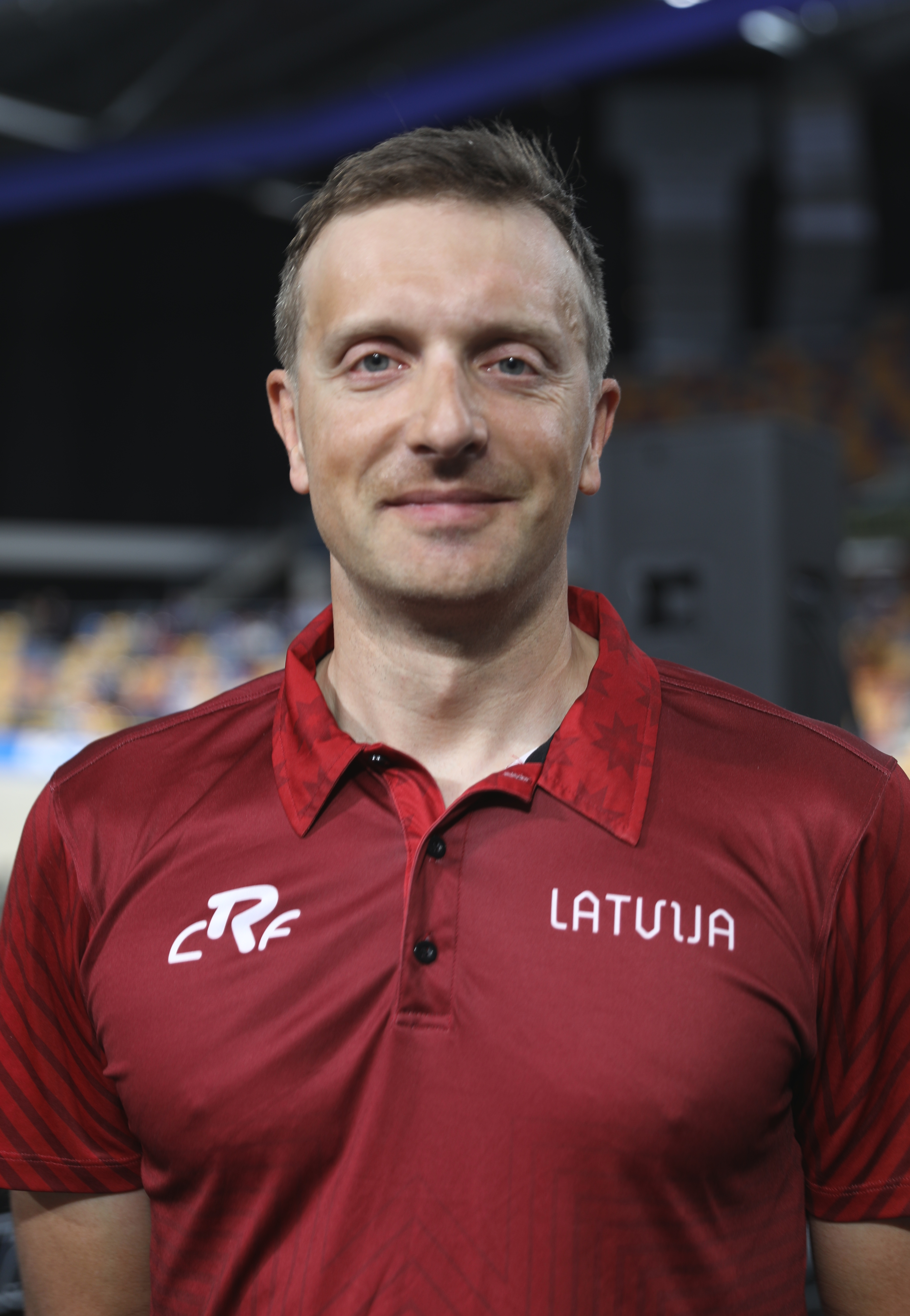
- Korņilovs in 2024

Personal information
- Born: 17 July 1979 (age 47)

Cycling career
- Sport: Cycling
- Disciplines: Road; Track
- Role: Rider

Amateur teams
- 2018: ZZK Team
- 2021: ZZK Team

Professional teams
- 2011–2017: Alpha Baltic–Unitymarathons.com
- 2019–2020: Amore & Vita–Prodir
- 2022–2023: Voltas Cycling Team

Vitālijs Korņilovs (born 17 July 1979) is a Latvian cyclist, who most recently rode for UCI Continental team Voltas–Madaris Cycling Team. He competed in the individual pursuit at the 2020 UCI Track Cycling World Championships.

== Major results ==
2006
3rd Time trial, National Road Championships
2008
National Road Championships

3rd Time trial
5th Road race

2009
3rd Riga Grand Prix
2011
3rd Time trial, National Road Championships
2016
5th Time trial, National Road Championships
2019
4th Road race, National Road Championships
2020
National Track Championships

1st Individual pursuit
3rd Points race
3rd Omnium

3rd Time trial, National Road Championships
