= Dainis Ozols =

Latvian cyclist (born 1966)

Personal information
- Born: 11 September 1966 (age 60) Smiltene, Latvian SSR, Soviet Union
- Height: 1.78 m (5 ft 10 in)
- Weight: 74 kg (163 lb)

Cycling career
- Sport: Cycling
- Current team: Retired
- Discipline: Road
- Role: Rider

Professional teams
- 1994: Trident–Schick
- 1995: Novell–Decca–Colnago
- 1997–1998: Mróz
- 2000: Mat–Ceresit–CCC
Medal record
Men's cycling
Representing Latvia
Olympic Games
Bronze medal – third place	1992 Barcelona	Individual Road Race

Dainis Ozols (born 11 September 1966) is a former professional cyclist from Latvia. In the 1992 Summer Olympics he won a bronze medal in the 194 km road race, finishing in 4:32:24, 3 seconds behind Erik Dekker of the Netherlands and 4 seconds behind the winner Fabio Casartelli of Italy. He competed in one Grand Tour in his career: the 1995 Vuelta a España, where he finished 50th overall.

His surname is often misspelled as Ozolos and he is often incorrectly identified as having Polish or Lithuanian Nationality. Early in his amateur career, he did race as a national of the USSR.

== Major results ==
1988
3rd Overall Okolo Slovenska

1st Stages 5 & 7

1989
1st Overall Rás Tailteann

1st Stages 4 & 9 (ITT)

1st Stage 5 Giro delle Regioni
1st Stages 3 & 4 Girobio
1992
1st Overall Regio-Tour

1st Stage 1

3rd Road race, Summer Olympics
1993
3rd Overall GP Tell

1st Stage 2

2nd Overall Circuit Franco-Belge

1st Stage 4

1994
1st Overall Circuit Franco-Belge

1st Stages 5 (ITT) & 7

1st Stage 3 Grand Prix François Faber
8th Overall Tour DuPont
1995
8th Tour de Berne
1996
4th Overall Peace Race

1st Stage 7

1997
National Road Championships

1st Time trial
4th Road race

1st Overall Rheinland-Pfalz Rundfahrt

1st Stage 9

1st Overall Tour of Małopolska
6th Overall Tour de Pologne
8th Overall Tour du Poitou Charentes
10th Overall Tour of Sweden
1998
1st Time trial, National Road Championships
1999
1st Time trial, National Road Championships
3rd Overall Saaremaa Velotuur

1st Stage 6 (ITT)

2000
1st Stage 9 Peace Race
2nd National Time Trial Championships
6th Overall Tour of Austria
