= Lija Laizāne =

Latvian cyclist

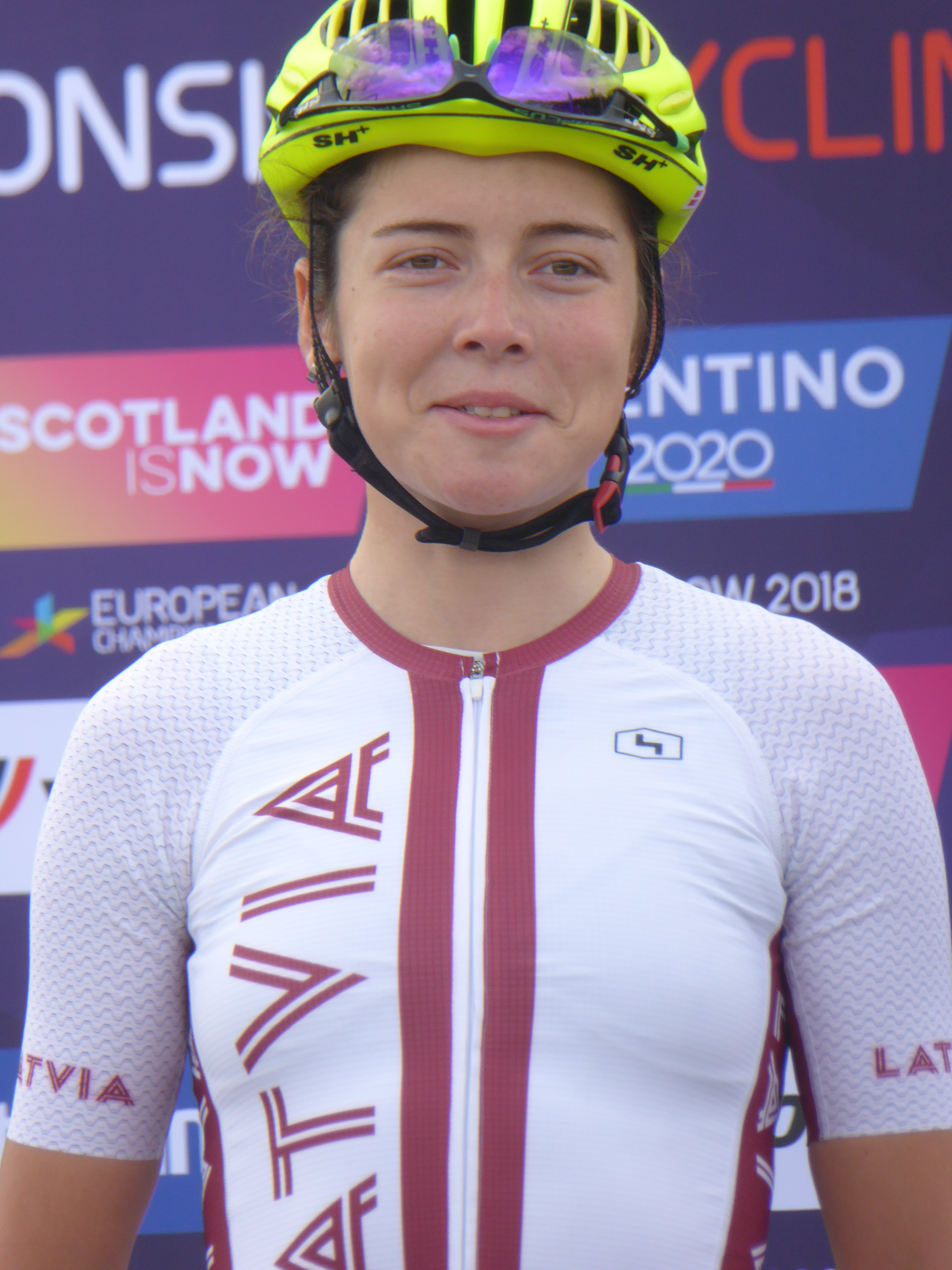
- Laizāne at the 2018 European Road Cycling Championships.

Personal information
- Born: 6 July 1993 (age 33) Riga, Latvia

Cycling career
- Sport: Cycling
- Discipline: Road
- Role: Rider
- Rider type: All-rounder

Professional teams
- 2014–2015: Vaiano Fondriest
- 2016: Servetto Footon
- 2016–2018: Aromitalia Vaiano
- 2019–2022: Eneicat
- 2023: Laboral Kutxa–Fundación Euskadi

Lija Laizāne (born 6 July 1993) is a Latvian racing cyclist. She rode at the UCI Road World Championships in 2014, 2015 and 2020.

For the 2023 season, Laizāne joined UCI Women's Continental Team Laboral Kutxa–Fundación Euskadi.

== Major results ==
2010
3rd Time trial, National Road Championships
2011
1st Time trial, National Road Championships
2012
2nd Time trial, National Road Championships
2014
3rd Time trial, National Road Championships
9th Chrono des Nations
2015
National Road Championships

1st Time trial
1st Road race

2016
National Road Championships

1st Time trial
1st Road race

2017
National Road Championships

1st Time trial
1st Road race

2018
National Road Championships

1st Time trial
1st Road race

2019
National Road Championships

1st Road race
2nd Time trial

2021
National Road Championships

2nd Time trial
3rd Road race

2022
National Road Championships

2nd Time trial
3rd Road race

2023
National Road Championships

2nd Time trial
3rd Road race
