= Dana Rožlapa =

Latvian cyclist

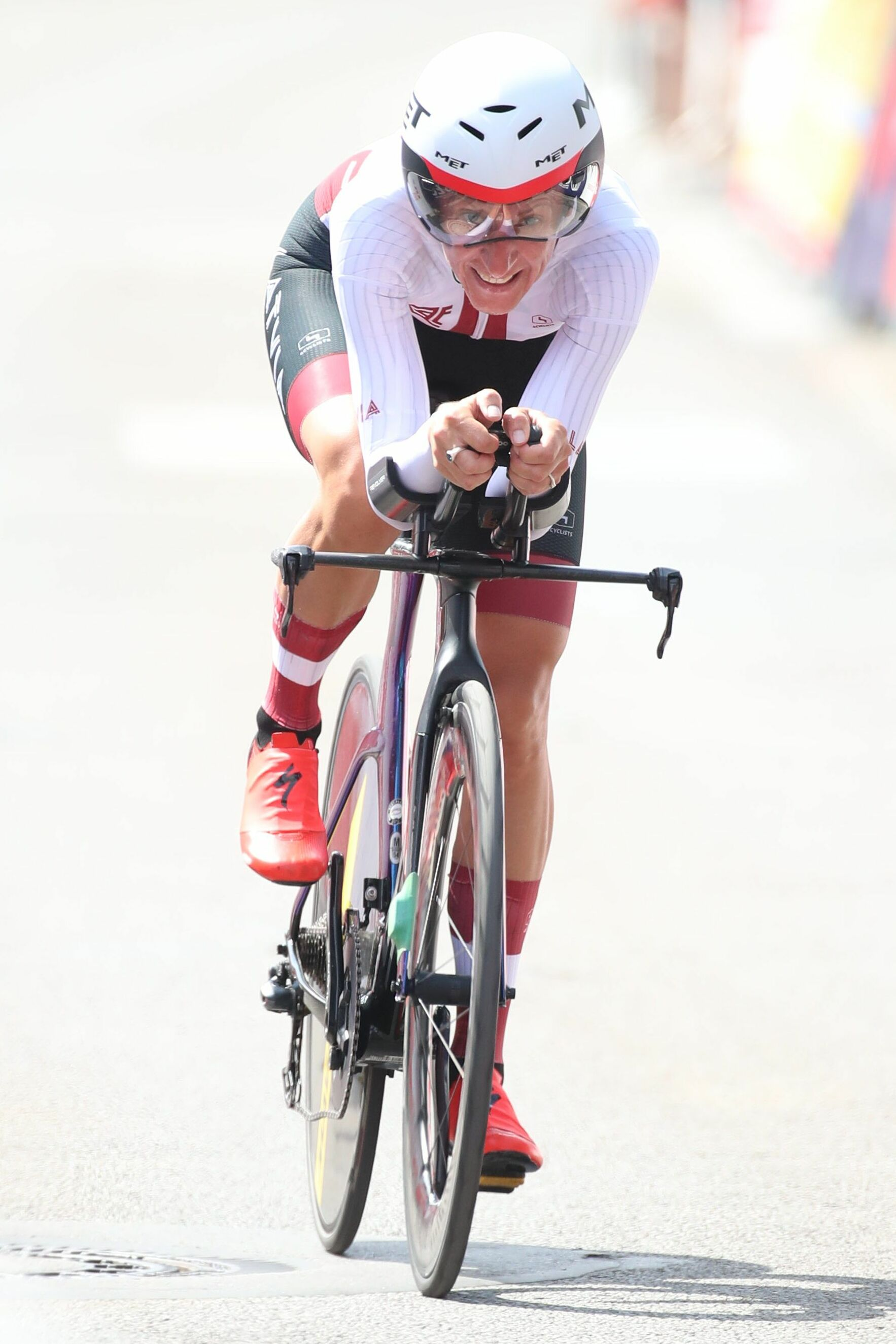
- Rožlapa at the 2022 European Road Championships

Personal information
- Born: 16 November 1979 (age 46): Talsi, Latvian SSR, Soviet Union; (now Latvia)

Cycling career
- Sport: Cycling
- Current team: Keukens Redant
- Disciplines: Road; Mountain biking
- Role: Rider

Amateur teams
- 2015–2016: Keukens Redant
- 2021–: Keukens Redant

Dana Rožlapa (born 16 November 1979) is a Latvian racing cyclist. She rode at the UCI Road World Championships in 2014, 2020 and 2021. Rožlapa is a ten-time winner of the Latvian National Time Trial Championships and a one time winner of the Latvian National Road Race Championships.

== Major results ==
2012
1st Time trial, National Road Championships
2013
1st Time trial, National Road Championships
2014
1st Time trial, National Road Championships
2015
1st Time trial, East Flanders Provincial Road Championships
2nd Road race, National Road Championships
2019
National Road Championships

1st Time trial
2nd Road race

2020
1st Time trial, National Road Championships
2021
National Road Championships

1st Time trial
2nd Road race

2022
National Road Championships

1st Time trial
2nd Road race

8th Chrono des Nations
2023
National Road Championships

1st Time trial
2nd Road race

8th Chrono des Nations
2024
National Road Championships
10th Chrono des Nations
2025
National Road Championships

1st Time trial
1st Road race

2026
National Road Championships

1st Time trial
