= Silovs =

Family name

Silovs is a surname. Notable people with the surname include:

- Juris Silovs (athlete) (1950–2018), Soviet sprinter;
- Juris Silovs (cyclist) (born 1973), Latvian cyclist;
- Haralds Silovs (born 1986), Latvian short track and long track speed skater;
- Artūrs Šilovs (born 2001), Latvian professional ice hockey player.
