= Kalvis (name) =

Kalvis is a Latvian given name. Notable people with the name include:

- Kalvis Eisaks
- Kalvis Kalniņš, Latvian karateka
- Kalvis Mihailovs
- Kalvis Torgāns, Latvian lawier, Supreme Court judge, professor
- Kalvis Zalcmanis (1940–2023), Latvian cinematographer
