= Viesturs Lukševics =

Latvian cyclist

Personal information
- Full name: Viesturs Lukševics
- Born: 16 April 1987 (age 39): Kuldīga, Latvian SSR, Soviet Union; (now Latvia)

Cycling career
- Sport: Cycling
- Discipline: Road
- Role: Rider

Professional teams
- 2006–2007: Rietumu Banka–Riga
- 2008: Dynatek–Latvia
- 2010: Kalev Chocolate–Kuota
- 2011–2012: Alpha Baltic–Unitymarathons.com
- 2012–2014: Amore & Vita
- 2015–2016: Alpha Baltic–Unitymarathons.com
- 2017: Rietumu Banka–Riga
- 2018–2020: Amore & Vita–Prodir

Viesturs Lukševics (born 16 April 1987) is a Latvian cyclist, who most recently rode for UCI Continental team Amore & Vita–Prodir.

== Major results ==
2008
7th Road race, National Road Championships
2009
National Road Championships

1st Under-23 road race
5th Road race

2010
8th GP Betonexpressz 2000
2011
5th Road race, National Road Championships
2012
10th Overall Tour of Japan
2014
6th Road race, National Road Championships
6th Overall Tour of Fuzhou
2015
1st Mountains classification Tour of Estonia
3rd Odessa Grand Prix 2
6th Overall Podlasie Tour
7th Road race, National Road Championships
2016
2nd Road race, National Road Championships
8th Overall Tour of Mersin
2017
National Road Championships

3rd Road race
5th Time trial

9th Memoriał Henryka Łasaka
10th Velothon Wales
2018
4th Road race, National Road Championships
2019
6th Road race, National Road Championships
2020
1st Road race, National Road Championships
