= Mārtiņš Trautmanis =

Latvian cyclist

Personal information
- Born: 7 July 1988 (age 38) Ventspils, Latvia

Cycling career
- Sport: Cycling
- Discipline: Road
- Role: Rider

Professional teams
- 2007–2008: Rietumu Banka–Riga
- 2015: Alpha Baltic–Maratoni.lv

Mārtiņš Trautmanis (born 7 July 1988 in Ventspils) is a Latvian cyclist.

== Palmares ==
2007
1st U23 National Time Trial Championships
2011
1st National Road Race Championships
