= Mārtiņš Pluto =

Latvian cyclist

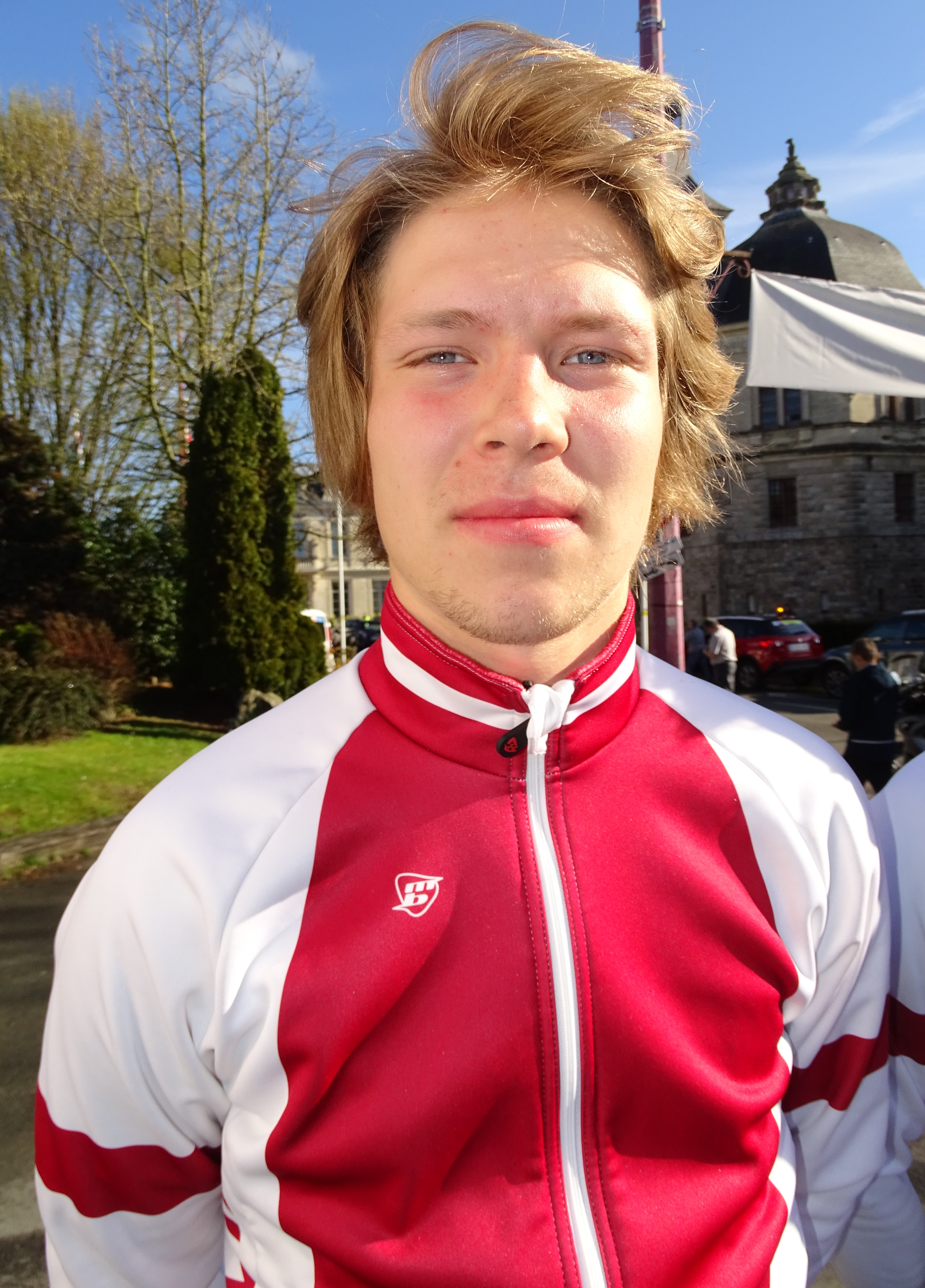
- Pluto at the 2016 Paris–Roubaix Juniors

Personal information
- Born: 13 January 1998 (age 28) Jūrmala, Latvia

Cycling career
- Sport: Cycling
- Current team: BEAT CC p/b Saxo
- Discipline: Road
- Role: Rider

Amateur team
- 2017: WV Noord Holland–Monkey Town

Professional teams
- 2018–2023: Monkey Town Continental Team
- 2024–: BEAT Cycling Club

Mārtiņš Pluto (born 13 January 1998) is a Latvian racing cyclist, who currently rides for UCI Continental team BEAT CC p/b Saxo. He competed in the road race at the 2021 UCI Road World Championships. He had his first win in a UCI race at the 2022 Midden–Brabant Poort Omloop.

== Major results ==
2016
1st Time trial, National Junior Road Championships
2017
3rd Road race, National Under-23 Road Championships
2018
1st Road race, National Under-23 Road Championships
5th Road race, National Road Championships
2019
1st Stage 5 Tour of Poyang Lake
2021
6th Ster van Zwolle
8th Kampioenschap van Vlaanderen
9th Overall Tour of Estonia
2022
1st Midden–Brabant Poort Omloop
3rd Memoriał Andrzeja Trochanowskiego
5th Overall Dookoła Mazowsza
8th Puchar Ministra Obrony Narodowej
2023
3rd Arno Wallaard Memorial
3rd Ronde van Overijssel
5th Ster van Zwolle
8th Overall Dookoła Mazowsza
8th Van Merksteijn Fences Classic
