= Anastasia Carbonari =

Latvian cyclist (born 2003)

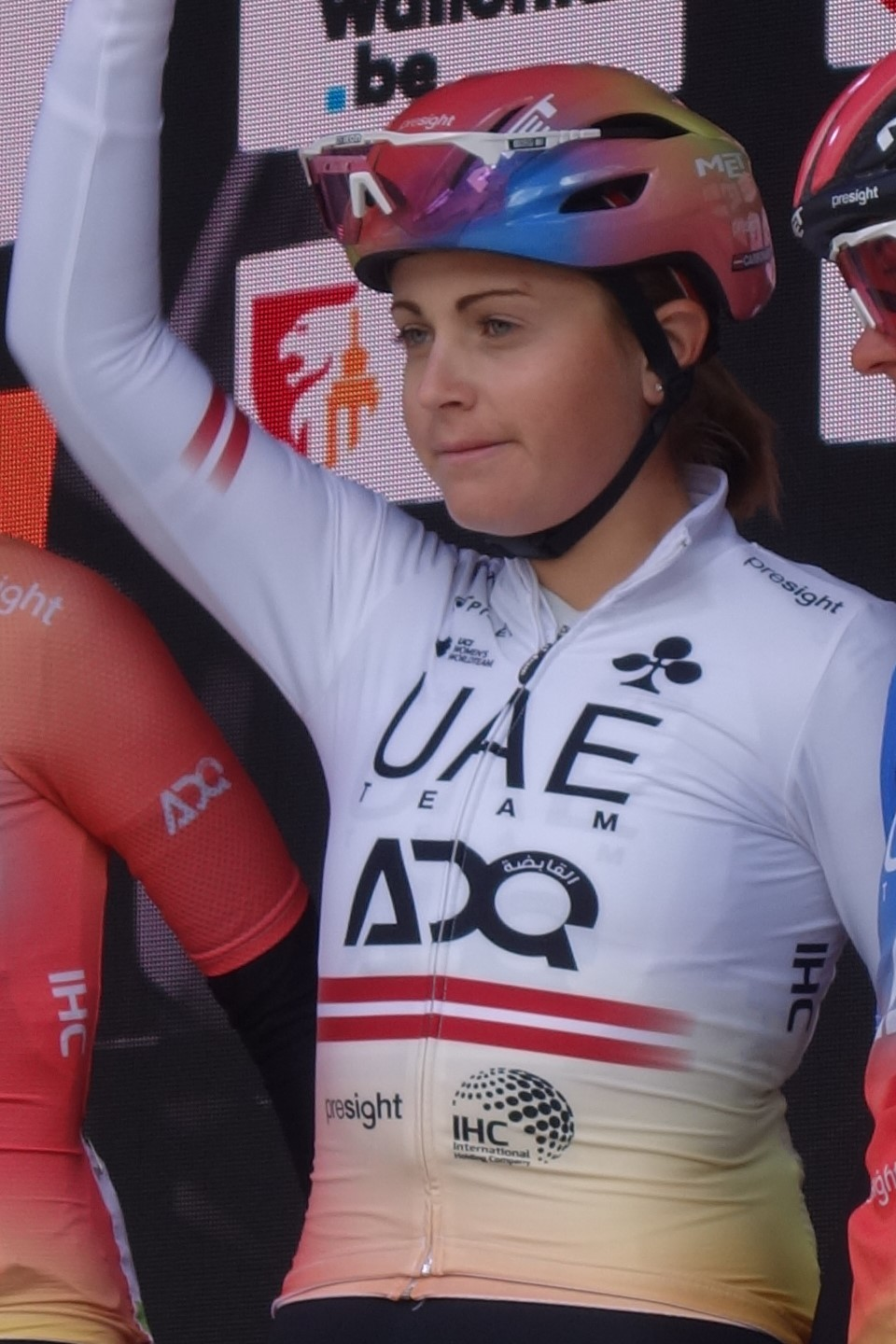
- Carbonari in 2024

Personal information
- Born: 11 September 1999 (age 27) Ancona, Italy
- Height: 1.65 m (5 ft 5 in)

Cycling career
- Sport: Cycling
- Current team: UAE Team L'Imad
- Discipline: Road
- Role: Rider

Professional teams
- 2020: Aromitalia–Basso Bikes–Vaiano
- 2021: Born to Win G20 Ambedo
- 2022: Valcar–Travel & Service
- 2023: UAE Development Team
- 2024–: UAE Team ADQ

Major wins
- One day races and Classics National Road Race Championships (2022, 2023, 2024)

Anastasia Carbonari (born 11 September 1999) is an Italian-born Latvian racing cyclist, who currently rides for UCI Women's WorldTeam UAE Team L'Imad. In 2022, she adopted the nationality of her mother, who was born in Riga, and began racing under the Latvian flag. She has since won three consecutive national titles at the Latvian Road Race Championships.

She qualified for the 2024 Summer Olympics after placing 39th in the road race at the 2023 UCI Road World Championships.

== Major results ==
2016
8th Piccolo Trofeo Alfredo Binda
2020
9th Overall Dubai Women's Tour
2021
10th Overall Belgrade GP Woman Tour
2022
National Road Championships

1st Road race
3rd Time trial

2023
1st Road race, National Road Championships
1st Stage 1b (TTT) Trofeo Ponente in Rosa
2nd Umag Trophy
2024
1st Road race, National Road Championships
