= Raivis Belohvoščiks =

Latvian cyclist (born 1976)

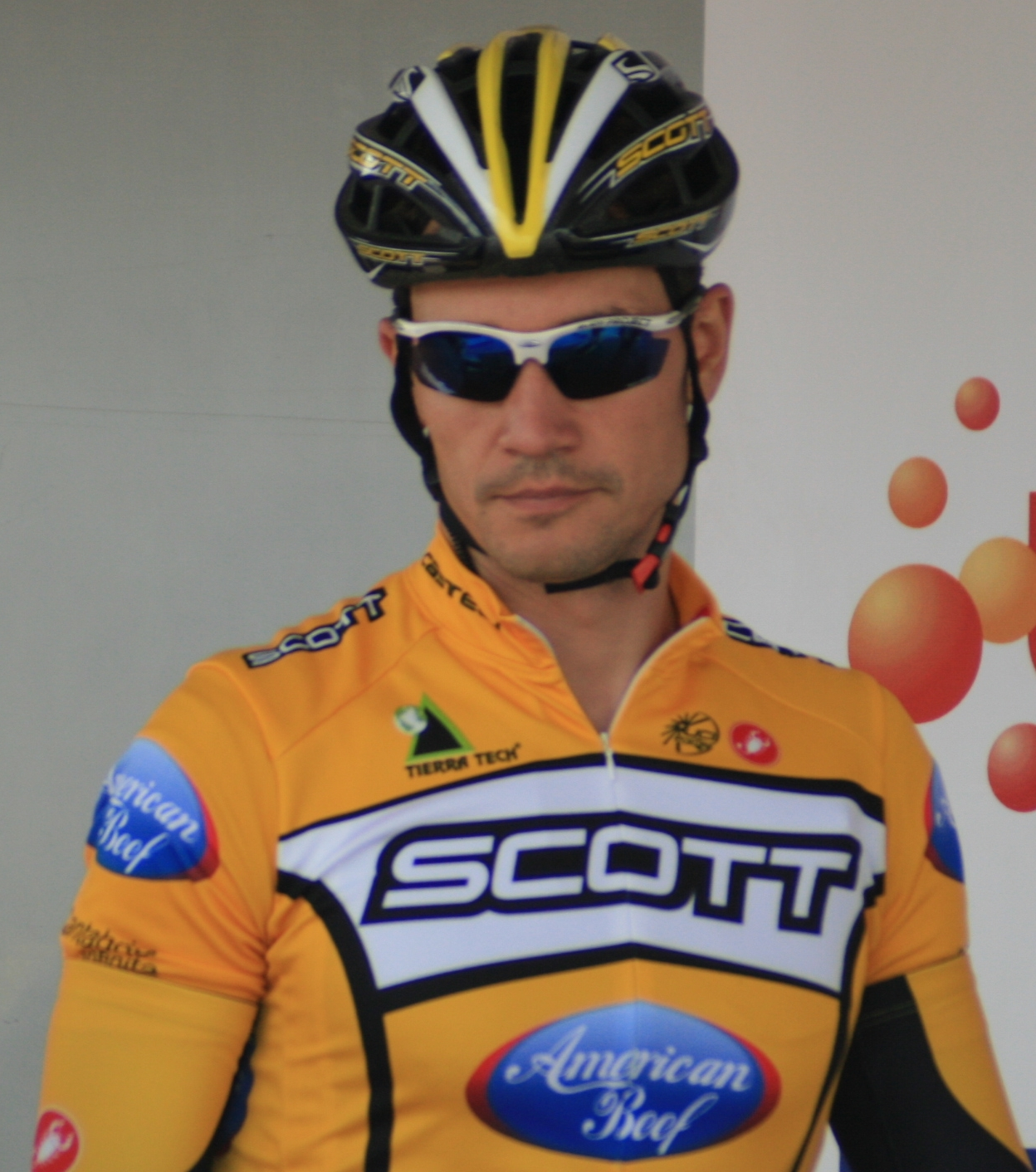
- Belohvosciks at the Eneco Tour 2008

Personal information
- Full name: Raivis Belohvoščiks
- Born: 21 January 1976 (age 50) Riga, Latvia
- Height: 1.82 m (6 ft 0 in)
- Weight: 68 kg (150 lb; 10.7 st)

Cycling career
- Sport: Cycling
- Discipline: Road
- Role: Rider
- Rider type: Time-trialist

Amateur team
- 1997: Cédico–Ville de Charleroi

Professional teams
- 1998: Mapei–Bricobi
- 1999–2002: Lampre–Daikin
- 2003–2004: Marlux–Wincor Nixdorf
- 2005–2006: Universal Caffè
- 2007–2008: Saunier Duval–Prodir
- 2009: Betonexpressz 2000–Limonta
- 2010: Ceramica Flaminia
- 2011: Team Vorarlberg

Major wins
- Stage races Three Days of De Panne (2003) One-day races and Classics Chrono des Nations (2006) National Road Race Championships (2002) 10×National Time Trial Championships (2000–2003, 2005–2010)

Raivis Belohvoščiks (born 21 January 1976) is a Latvian former professional road cyclist who specialized in individual time trial events. He is ten-time Latvian national time trial champion. In 2006 he signed a 2-year contract with UCI ProTour team Saunier Duval–Prodir, but this was not renewed for the 2009 season. In 2010, he rode for Ceramica Flaminia. He didn't achieve any major results in his first Tour de France. He was 40th in the first time trial around Metz. He was one of the major victims of the Passage du Gois in stage 2, and arrived last in stage 6 to Maubeuge. He left the race during the stage (10) to L'Alpe d'Huez.

== Major results ==
1995
1st Liège–Bastogne–Liège U23
1996
1st Liège–Bastogne–Liège U23
1997
1st Gran Premio di Poggiana
4th Overall Tour de Wallonie

1st Stage 5

5th Time trial, UCI World Under-23 Road Championships
1998
5th Overall Okolo Slovenska
1999
1st GP d'Europe (with Marco Pinotti)
1st Stage 7 (ITT) Deutschland Tour
3rd Road race, National Road Championships
4th Time trial, UCI Road World Championships
5th Firenze–Pistoia
2000
National Road Championships

1st Time trial
2nd Road race

1st Stage 5 (ITT) Tour de Suisse
2nd Chrono des Herbiers
2nd GP d'Europe
5th Overall Vuelta a Murcia
7th Overall Ronde van Nederland
2001
National Road Championships

1st Time trial
3rd Road race

2nd Overall Tour de Luxembourg

1st Stage 4

7th Chrono des Herbiers
2002
National Road Championships

1st Road race
1st Time trial

4th LuK Challenge Chrono
5th Firenze–Pistoia
10th Time trial, UCI Road World Championships
2003
1st Time trial, National Road Championships
1st Overall Three Days of De Panne

1st Stage 3b

4th E3 Prijs Vlaanderen
6th Gent–Wevelgem
7th Chrono des Herbiers
2004
5th Chrono des Herbiers
2005
1st Time trial, National Road Championships
4th Chrono des Herbiers
2006
1st Time trial, National Road Championships
1st Chrono des Herbiers
1st Stage 6 Tour of Japan
9th Gran Premio Bruno Beghelli
2007
1st Time trial, National Road Championships
2nd Chrono des Nations
2008
1st Time trial, National Road Championships
1st Stage 7 (ITT) Eneco Tour
3rd Chrono des Nations
2009
1st Time trial, National Road Championships
2010
1st Time trial, National Road Championships

=== Grand Tour general classification results timeline ===
| Grand Tour | 1999 | 2000 | 2001 | 2002 | 2003 | 2004 | 2005 | 2006 | 2007 | 2008 |
|---|---|---|---|---|---|---|---|---|---|---|
| Giro d'Italia | — | — | — | — | — | — | — | — | 117 | DNF |
| Tour de France | DNF | — | 110 | 118 | — | — | — | — | — | — |
| Vuelta a España | — | — | — | — | — | — | — | — | — | — |

Legend
| — | Did not compete |
| DNF | Did not finish |
