= Aleksejs Saramotins =

Latvian professional road cyclist

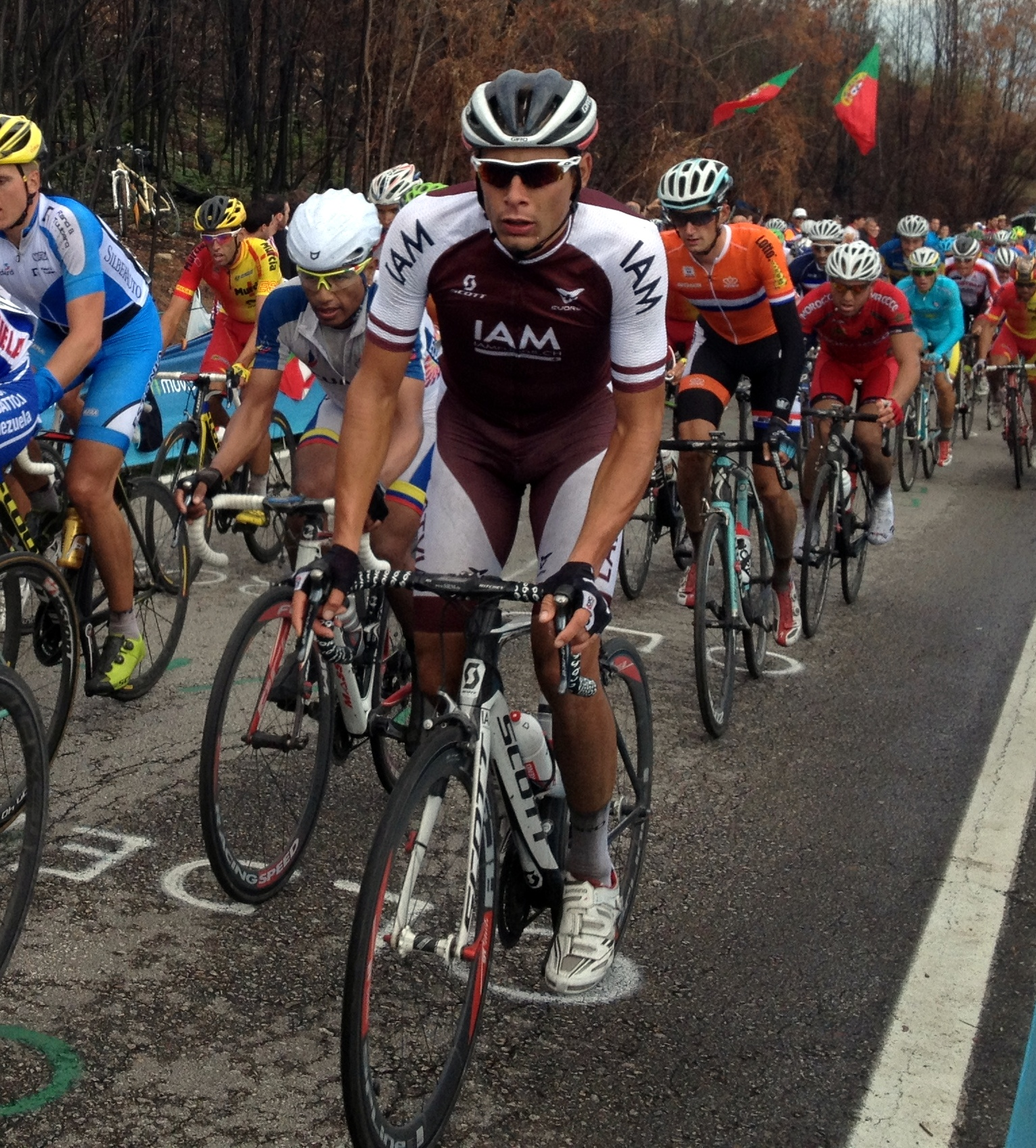
- Saramotins at the 2014 UCI Road World Championships

Personal information
- Full name: Aleksejs Saramotins
- Born: 8 April 1982 (age 44) Riga, Latvian SSR (now Latvia)
- Height: 184 cm (6 ft 0 in)
- Weight: 75 kg (165 lb)

Cycling career
- Sport: Cycling
- Discipline: Road
- Role: Rider
- Rider type: Classics specialist

Professional teams
- 2005–2008: Rietumu Banka–Riga
- 2009: Team Designa Køkken
- 2010: Team HTC–Columbia
- 2011–2012: Cofidis
- 2013–2016: IAM Cycling
- 2017–2018: Bora–Hansgrohe
- 2019: Interpro Cycling Academy

Major wins
- One-Day Races and Classics National Road Race Championships (2005–2007, 2010, 2012–2013, 2015) National Time Trial Championships (2017)

Aleksejs Saramotins (born 8 April 1982) is a Latvian professional road cyclist, who last rode for UCI Continental team Interpro Cycling Academy. He has won the Latvian National Road Race Championships on seven occasions and has represented his country at the Summer Olympic Games and the UCI Road World Championships.

== Career ==
=== Amateur career ===
Before signing a professional contract Saramotins raced in cross-country mountain biking races.

=== Professional career ===
In 2009 he won the Münsterland Giro whilst riding for Team Designa Køkken which led to him joining Team HTC–Columbia in 2010. Saramotins left his team of two years Cofidis at the end of the 2012 season, and joined the new IAM Cycling team for the 2013 season.

In October 2016 he and IAM Cycling teammate Matteo Pelucchi were announced as members of the Bora–Hansgrohe squad for 2017. After two years, he joined Interpro Cycling Academy for the 2019 season.

== Major results ==
2004
3rd Road race, National Road Championships
2005
1st Road race, National Road Championships
5th Tallinn–Tartu GP
8th Overall Szlakiem Grodów Piastowskich
8th Overall Okolo Slovenska
2006
1st Road race, National Road Championships
2nd Mayor Cup
2nd Memorial Oleg Dyachenko
2nd Riga Grand Prix
4th Overall Circuit des Ardennes
5th Tallinn–Tartu GP
6th Scandinavian Open Road Race
9th Tartu GP
2007
National Road Championships

1st Road race
3rd Time trial

1st Stage 4 Tour of Croatia
2nd Memorial Oleg Dyachenko
2nd Tallinn–Tartu GP
2nd Riga Grand Prix
3rd Mayor Cup
3rd Puchar Ministra Obrony Narodowej
4th Tartu GP
6th Overall Five Rings of Moscow
6th Grand Prix de la Ville de Lillers
2008
1st Lombardia Tour
1st Tartu GP
1st Scandinavian Open Road Race
1st Stage 1 Circuit des Ardennes
1st Stage 3 Okolo Slovenska
2nd Tour du Finistère
3rd Riga Grand Prix
3rd Le Samyn
9th Paris–Troyes
9th Mayor Cup
10th Overall Tour de Normandie
2009
1st Grand Prix de la Ville de Lillers
1st Druivenkoers Overijse
1st Münsterland Giro
1st Stage 3 Ronde de l'Oise
National Road Championships

2nd Road race
2nd Time trial

2nd Tartu GP
2nd Duo Normand (with Sergey Firsanov)
4th Grand Prix Cristal Energie
7th Overall Les 3 Jours de Vaucluse
2010
National Road Championships

1st Road race
2nd Time trial

1st Grand Prix d'Isbergues
1st Pirita GP Tallinn VII Lauri Aus Memoriaal
5th Tartu GP
2011
National Road Championships

2nd Road race
2nd Time trial

8th Binche–Tournai–Binche
10th Le Samyn
2012
National Road Championships

1st Road race
2nd Time trial

7th Overall Boucles de la Mayenne
7th Tro-Bro Léon
9th Overall Tour du Limousin
10th Eschborn–Frankfurt – Rund um den Finanzplatz
2013
National Road Championships

1st Road race
2nd Time trial

1st Tour du Doubs
2nd Tour du Jura
5th Strade Bianche
9th Polynormande
2014
1st Stage 5 (ITT) Vuelta a Burgos
National Road Championships

2nd Road race
2nd Time trial

5th Chrono des Nations
2015
National Road Championships

1st Road race
2nd Time trial

7th Road race, European Games
2016
2nd Time trial, National Road Championships
3rd Clásica de Almería
8th Paris–Roubaix
2017
1st Time trial, National Road Championships
2018
National Road Championships

2nd Road race
3rd Time trial

3rd Overall Czech Cycling Tour

1st Stage 1 (TTT)

4th Grand Prix Pino Cerami
2019
National Road Championships

2nd Road race
2nd Time trial

5th Overall Tour de Tochigi

=== Grand Tour general classification results timeline ===
Grand Tour	2011	2012	2013	2014	2015
Giro d'Italia	—	—	—	—	161
Tour de France	Has not contested during his career				
Vuelta a España	166	—	—	DNF	—

Legend
—	Did not compete
DNF	Did not finish
