= Ipso–Euroclean =

Team information
- UCI code: ASF
- Registered: Belgium
- Founded: 1993
- Disbanded: 1999
- Discipline: Road

Key personnel
- General manager: Willy Van der Eecken; Joseph De Wachter

Team name history
- 1993 1994 1995 1996 1997–1999: Trident–Schick–Gilals–Wimi; Trident–Schick; Asfra Racing Team–Orlans–Blaze; Ipso–Asfra Racing Team; Ipso–Euroclean
Ipso–Euroclean jersey
Jersey

Ipso–Euroclean was a Belgian professional cycling team that existed from 1993 to 1999. It underwent several name changes, being known as Trident–Schick and the Asfra Racing Team before forming the Ipso team in 1996.

== Major wins ==
- Circuit Franco-Belge: Dainis Ozols (1994)
- Scheldeprijs: Peter Van Petegem (1994)
- Tour de Vendée: Patrick Van Roosbroeck (1994)
- Tour de Berne: Andreas Kappes (1994)
- Internatie Reningelst: Arvis Piziks (1994)
- Schaal Sels: Daniel Verelst (1994)
