= Gatis Smukulis =

Latvian road bicycle racer

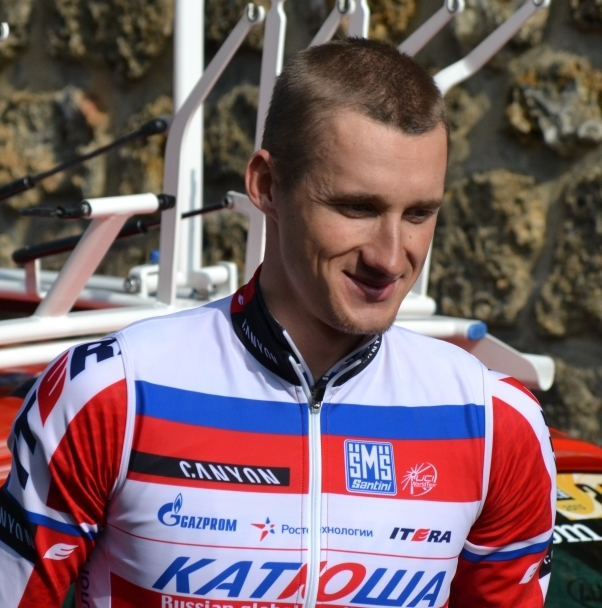
- Smukulis at the 2013 Paris–Nice

Personal information
- Full name: Gatis Smukulis
- Born: 15 April 1987 (age 39): Valka, Latvian SSR, Soviet Union; (now Latvia)
- Height: 1.88 m (6 ft 2 in)
- Weight: 81 kg (179 lb; 12.8 st)

Cycling career
- Sport: Cycling
- Current team: Retired
- Discipline: Road
- Role: Rider
- Rider type: All-rounder

Amateur teams
- 2004–2005: Rietumu Banka–Riga
- 2006: Lotus–MBK–UC Sud Luberon
- 2007–2008: Vélo-Club La Pomme Marseille

Professional teams
- 2009–2010: Ag2r–La Mondiale
- 2011: HTC–Highroad
- 2012–2015: Team Katusha
- 2016: Astana
- 2017–2018: Delko–Marseille Provence KTM

Major wins
- One-day races and Classics National Road Race Championships (2016) National Time Trial Championships (2011–2016)

Gatis Smukulis (born 15 April 1987) is a Latvian former professional road bicycle racer, who rode professionally between 2009 and 2018 for the Ag2r–La Mondiale, HTC–Highroad, Team Katusha, Astana and Delko–Marseille Provence KTM teams. Smukulis won the Latvian National Road Race Championships in 2016, and won six consecutive Latvian National Time Trial Championships between 2011 and 2016.

== Major results ==
2005
1st Overall Trofeo Karlsberg
2nd Road race, National Road Championships
7th Road race, UEC European Junior Road Championships
2006
National Under-23 Road Championships

1st Road race
1st Time trial

2007
1st Riga Grand Prix
1st Cinturó de l'Empordà
2nd Overall Grand Prix Guillaume Tell
4th E.O.S. Tallinn GP
9th Time trial, UEC European Under-23 Road Championships
2008
1st Time trial, National Under-23 Road Championships
1st Les Boucles du Sud Ardèche
1st Ronde van Vlaanderen Beloften
3rd Overall Ronde de l'Isard

1st Stage 1

9th Time trial, UEC European Under-23 Road Championships
2009
3rd Time trial, National Road Championships
5th Overall Coupe des nations Ville Saguenay
2010
National Road Championships

2nd Road race
3rd Time trial

2011
National Road Championships

1st Time trial
4th Road race

1st Stage 1 Volta a Catalunya
2012
1st Time trial, National Road Championships
2013
National Road Championships

1st Time trial
2nd Road race

2014
National Road Championships

1st Time trial
3rd Road race

2015
1st Time trial, National Road Championships
1st Prologue (TTT) Tour of Austria
7th Time trial, European Games
2016
National Road Championships

1st Time trial
1st Road race

Combativity award Stage 13 Vuelta a España
2017
4th Time trial, National Road Championships
2018
2nd Time trial, National Road Championships
10th Overall Tour of Almaty

=== Grand Tour general classification results timeline ===
Grand Tour	2012	2013	2014	2015	2016
Giro d'Italia	84	—	—	—	—
Tour de France	—	119	100	—	—
Vuelta a España	117	—	—	146	83

Legend
—	Did not compete
DNF	Did not finish
