= Andris Reiss =

Latvian cyclist

Personal information
- Full name: Andris Reiss
- Born: March 10, 1978 (age 48) Kuldīga, Latvian SSR

Cycling career
- Sport: Cycling
- Current team: Retired
- Discipline: Road
- Role: Rider

Professional team
- 2002: Index–Alexia Alluminio

Major wins
- National Road Race Championships (2001)

Andris Reiss (Kuldīga, 10 March 1978) was a Latvian former professional cyclist. He rode in the 2002 Vuelta a España, finishing 95th overall. He also competed in the road race at the 2000 Summer Olympics, and finished in 81st place.

== Major results ==
1998
5th National Road Race Championships
2001
1st National Road Race Championships
2nd Giro del Medio Brenta
2nd Overall Girobio
