= Andžs Flaksis =

Latvian bicycle racer

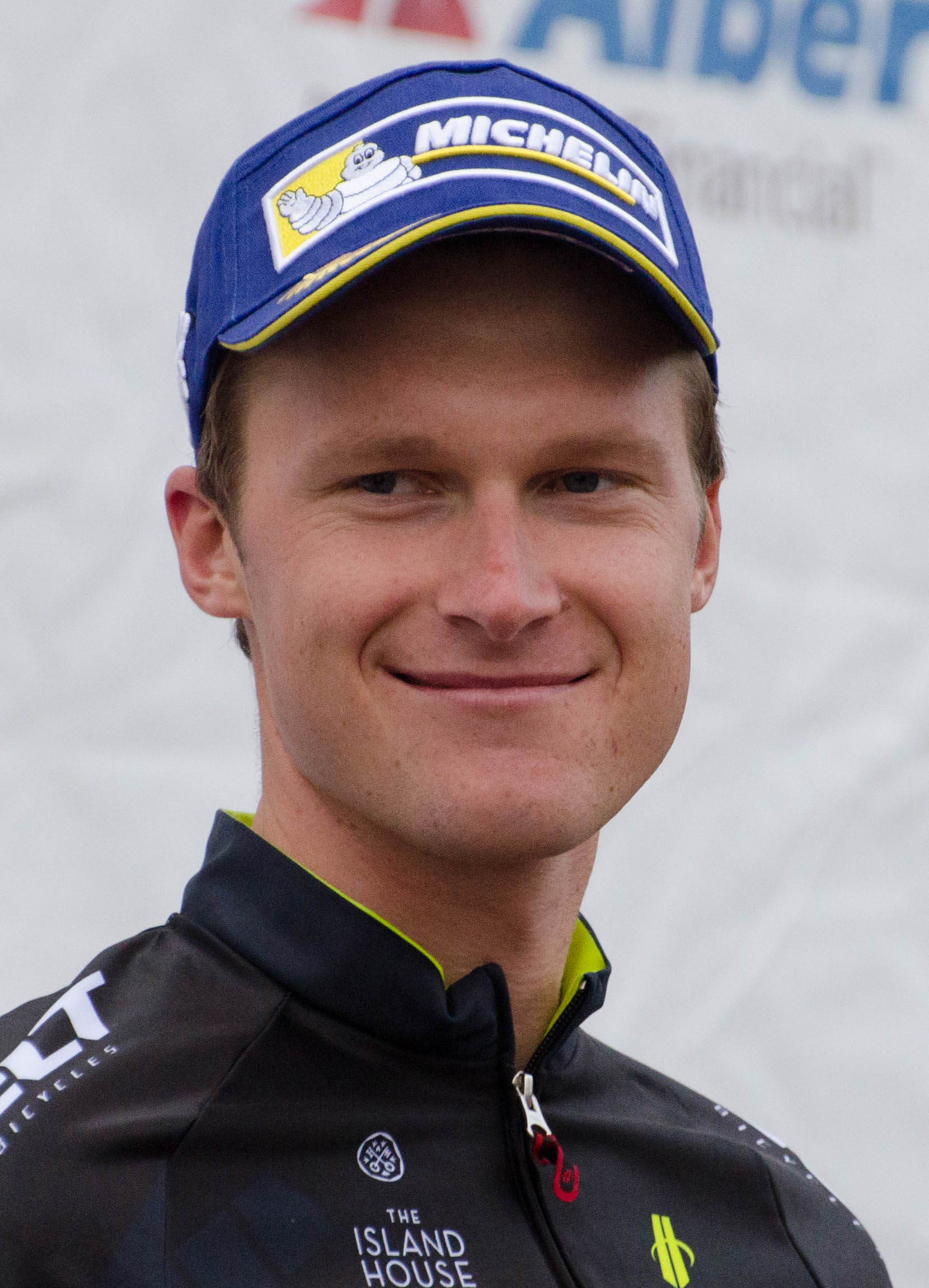
- Flaksis at the 2016 Tour of Alberta

Personal information
- Full name: Andžs Flaksis
- Born: 18 March 1991 (age 35): Priekule, Latvian SSR; (now Latvia)

Cycling career
- Sport: Cycling
- Discipline: Road
- Role: Rider

Amateur teams
- 2020–2022: DTG–Mysport
- 2023: Miami Nights

Professional teams
- 2008–2011: Rietumu Banka–Riga
- 2012: Chipotle–First Solar Development Team
- 2013: Bontrager Cycling Team
- 2014: Rietumu–Delfin
- 2015–2019: Hincapie Racing Team
Medal record
Representing Latvia
Men's road bicycle racing
European Championships
Silver medal – second place	2012 Goes	Under-23 road race

Andžs Flaksis (born 18 March 1991) is a Latvian professional road cyclist, who last rode for club team Miami Nights.

Since 2020 races on amateur level with Latvian DTG/Mysport roadand MTB team.

== Major results ==
2010
2nd Time trial, National Under-23 Road Championships
7th Overall Dookoła Mazowsza
2011
1st Time trial, National Under-23 Road Championships
1st Scandinavian Race Uppsala
3rd Ronde van Vlaanderen U23
3rd Jurmala Grand Prix
4th Memorial Oleg Dyachenko
2012
National Road Championships

1st Under-23 time trial
2nd Road race
3rd Time trial

1st Riga Grand Prix
2nd Road race, UEC European Under-23 Road Championships
2013
National Road Championships

1st Under-23 time trial
2nd Under-23 road race
4th Road race

5th Time trial, UEC European Under-23 Road Championships
2014
National Road Championships

3rd Time trial
5th Road race

2015
9th Reading 120
2016
3rd Fort McLellan Road Race
3rd Reading 120
2017
1st Overall Tour de Beauce
2018
National Road Championships

3rd Road race
5th Time trial

5th Overall Baltic Chain Tour
2019
3rd Road race, National Road Championships
2021
2nd Road race, National Road Championships
2022
2nd Road race, National Road Championships
2023
4th Road race, National Road Championships
