= Toms Skujiņš =

Latvian racing cyclist (born 1991)

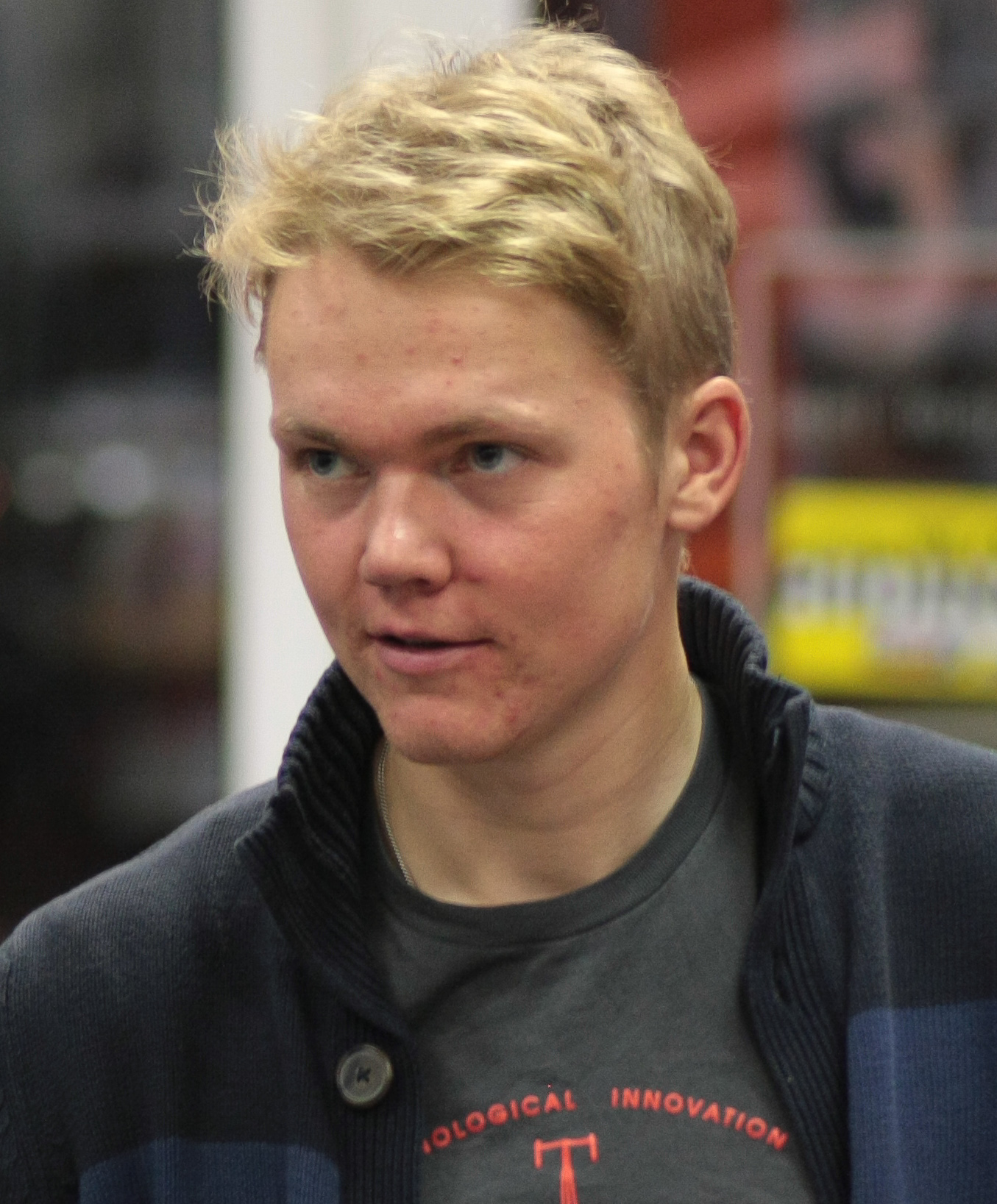
- Skujiņš in 2015

Personal information
- Born: 15 June 1991 (age 35) Sigulda, Latvia
- Height: 1.80 m (5 ft 11 in)
- Weight: 70 kg (154 lb)

Cycling career
- Sport: Cycling
- Current team: Lidl–Trek
- Discipline: Road
- Role: Rider
- Rider type: All-rounder

Professional teams
- 2011–2012: La Pomme Marseille
- 2013: Rietumu–Delfin
- 2014–2015: Hincapie Sportswear Development Team
- 2016–2017: Cannondale
- 2018–: Trek–Segafredo

Major wins
- One-day races and Classics National Road Race Championships (2019, 2021, 2025) National Time Trial Championships (2018, 2021, 2022, 2023, 2025) Tre Valli Varesine (2018) Other UCI America Tour (2015)
Medal record
Representing Latvia
Men's road bicycle racing
European Championships
Bronze medal – third place	2013 Olomouc	Under-23 road race

Toms Skujiņš (born 15 June 1991) is a Latvian professional road racing cyclist, who rides for UCI WorldTeam Lidl–Trek.

He is a two-time Latvian road race champion and won the national time trial championships four times. He has competed in the Tour de France eight times.

== Career ==
In 2013 and 2015, Skujiņš received the Cyclist of the Year award presented by Latvian Cycling Federation.

In 2014, Skujiņš dominated the Canadian race Tour de Beauce, winning its queen stage atop Mont Mégantic and the last stage. He was the victor of the general classification and also brought home the points classification and young rider classification jerseys.

In 2015 he rode for the Hincapie Racing Team and won the third stage of the Tour of California after spending most of the stage in a solo breakaway. He also took the race leader and mountains leader jerseys, which he would hold until the time trial. He would go on to win the 2015 UCI America Tour.

He was named in the start list for the 2017 Vuelta a España. In July 2018, he was named in the start list for the Tour de France. He took the polka dot jersey as the leader of the mountains classification following the fifth stage, which he held for five days. He won the combativity award on the fifth stage in both 2018 and 2019.

Skujiņš finished second on the eighth stage of the 2020 Tour de France after spending the day in a breakaway. He also rode as a domestique for team leaders Richie Porte and Bauke Mollema, with Porte ultimately finishing third overall in the race.

In 2024, he finished second on the 2024 Strade Bianche, 2'44" behind Tadej Pogačar.

== Personal life ==
Skujiņš is married to former professional cyclist Abigail Mickey.

== Major results ==
2010
1st Stage 1 Tour de Moselle
2nd Tartu GP
3rd Time trial, National Under-23 Road Championships
3rd Memorial Oleg Dyachenko
5th Overall Tour du Gévaudan Languedoc-Roussillon
6th Paris–Tours Espoirs
7th Overall Cinturó de l'Empordà
7th Mayor Cup
7th Coupe des Carpathes
8th ZLM Tour
2011
2nd Ronde van Vlaanderen U23
3rd Time trial, National Under-23 Road Championships
4th Classic Loire Atlantique
8th Tallinn–Tartu GP
2012
5th Riga Grand Prix
2013
National Road Championships

1st Under-23 road race
3rd Road race

1st Overall Course de la Paix U23

1st Stage 3

1st Stage 2 Tour de Blida
3rd Road race, UEC European Under-23 Road Championships
3rd Scandinavian Race Uppsala
5th Road race, UCI Road World Under-23 Championships
7th Overall Tour de Guadeloupe
7th Ronde van Vlaanderen U23
8th Ringerike GP
9th Overall Tour de l'Avenir
9th Hadeland GP
10th Overall Tour of Norway
2014
1st Overall Tour de Beauce

1st Points classification
1st Young rider classification
1st Stages 2 & 5

6th Philadelphia International Championship
2015 (1 pro win)
1st Overall UCI America Tour
1st Winston-Salem Cycling Classic
1st Stage 3 Tour of California
2nd Overall Tour de Beauce
2nd The Reading 120
3rd Philadelphia International Cycling Classic
4th Course de Solidarność et des Champions Olympiques
7th Overall Tour of Alberta
8th Overall USA Pro Cycling Challenge
2016 (1)
1st Stage 5 Tour of California
National Road Championships

3rd Road race
3rd Time trial

2017 (1)
2nd Time trial, National Road Championships
2nd Overall Settimana Internazionale di Coppi e Bartali

1st Stage 2

10th GP Miguel Induráin
2018 (4)
1st Time trial, National Road Championships
1st Tre Valli Varesine
1st Trofeo Lloseta–Andratx
Tour of California

1st Mountains classification
1st Stage 3

7th Grote Prijs Jef Scherens
8th Overall Colorado Classic
Tour de France

Held after Stages 5–9
Combativity award Stage 5

2019 (1)
1st Road race, National Road Championships
3rd Tre Valli Varesine
9th Strade Bianche
10th Overall Deutschland Tour
Combativity award Stage 5 Tour de France
2021 (2)
National Road Championships

1st Road race
1st Time trial

5th Overall Vuelta a Andalucía
5th Brabantse Pijl
2022 (1)
1st Time trial, National Road Championships
1st Mountains classification, Tour de Romandie
4th Maryland Cycling Classic
5th Binche–Chimay–Binche
7th Clásica de San Sebastián
8th Overall Tour Poitou-Charentes en Nouvelle-Aquitaine
9th Overall Étoile de Bessèges
9th Bretagne Classic
2023 (1)
National Road Championships

1st Time trial
3rd Road race

Giro d'Italia

1st Intermediate sprint classification
Combativity award Stage 12

5th Maryland Cycling Classic
5th Circuito de Getxo
6th Clásica de San Sebastián
8th Road race, UCI Road World Championships
9th Overall Danmark Rundt
9th Brabantse Pijl
9th Circuit Franco-Belge
10th Overall Tour of Belgium
2024
2nd Strade Bianche
4th Road race, UCI Road World Championships
5th Road race, Olympic Games
6th Grand Prix Cycliste de Montréal
8th E3 Saxo Classic
8th Japan Cup
10th Tour of Flanders
2025 (2)
National Road Championships

1st Road race
1st Time trial

5th Road race, UCI Road World Championships
5th Road race, UEC European Road Championships
6th Tre Valli Varesine
7th Overall Tour de Luxembourg
8th Circuito de Getxo
10th Overall Renewi Tour
2026
4th Road race, UEC European Road Championships
10th Paris–Tours
10th Andorra MoraBanc Clàssica

=== Grand tour general classification results timeline ===
Grand Tour	2016	2017	2018	2019	2020	2021	2022	2023	2024	2025
Giro d'Italia	—	—	—	—	—	—	—	31	—	—
Tour de France	—	—	82	81	81	71	60	—	45	95
Vuelta a España	—	123	—	—	—	—	—	—	—	—

=== Classics results timeline ===
Monument	2016	2017	2018	2019	2020	2021	2022	2023	2024	2025	2026
Milan–San Remo	—	82	—	83	—	75	88	88	32	—	—
Tour of Flanders	55	—	—	—	81	—	96	—	10	37	—
Paris–Roubaix	—	—	—	—	NH	44	DNF	—	—	—	—
Liège–Bastogne–Liège	38	107	88	26	35	22	—	—	48	—	—
Giro di Lombardia	—	—	44	43	—	27	—	—	96	28	—
Classic	2016	2017	2018	2019	2020	2021	2022	2023	2024	2025	2026
Omloop Het Nieuwsblad	—	—	—	—	—	—	50	55	27	31	36
Strade Bianche	—	75	—	9	DNF	45	16	17	2	12	—
E3 Saxo Bank Classic	—	—	—	—	—	—	—	62	8	11	—
Gent–Wevelgem	—	—	—	—	86	—	—	51	—	46	—
Brabantse Pijl	92	125	—	—	—	5	—	9	—	—	—
Amstel Gold Race	67	125	40	23	NH	86	28	28	39	39	—
La Flèche Wallonne	147	134	104	62	40	49	—	—	12	—	—
Clásica de San Sebastián	—	—	13	13	NH	—	7	6	—	43	80
Hamburg Cyclassics	—	—	—	24	Not held		—	30	—	—	—
Bretagne Classic	—	—	—	—	—	—	9	—	—	—	—
Grand Prix Cycliste de Québec	91	—	88	107	Not held		14	28	22	—	20
Grand Prix Cycliste de Montréal	22	—	13	23	Not held		12	35	6	—	29
Paris–Tours	—	—	—	—	—	—	40	65	—	—	10

=== Major championships timeline ===
Event		2010	2011	2012	2013	2014	2015	2016	2017	2018	2019	2020	2021	2022	2023	2024	2025	2026
Olympic Games	Road race	Not held		—	Not held			59	Not held				22	Not held		5	Not held	
Olympic Games	Time trial	Not held		—	Not held			—	Not held				30	Not held		—	Not held	
World Championships	Road race	—	—	—	—	DNF	—	—	—	62	21	29	60	—	8	4	5	23
World Championships	Time trial	—	—	—	—	—	—	—	—	44	—	—	—	—	33	—	—	—
European Championships	Road race	Race did not exist						19	—	—	15	—	—	47	13	—	5	4
National Championships	Road race	8	—	4	3	4	4	3	10	8	1	—	1	5	3	—	1	—
National Championships	Time trial	—	—	—	—	—	—	3	2	1	—	—	1	1	1	—	1	—

Legend
—	Did not compete
DNF	Did not finish
IP	In progress
NH	Not held
