= Māris Bogdanovičs =

Latvian cyclist (born 1991)

Personal information
- Born: 19 November 1991 (age 34) Dobele, Latvia
- Height: 1.77 m (5 ft 10 in)
- Weight: 68 kg (150 lb)

Cycling career
- Sport: Cycling
- Current team: FNIX–SCOM–Hengxiang Cycling Team
- Discipline: Road
- Role: Rider

Professional teams
- 2011–2015: Alpha Baltic–Unitymarathons.com
- 2016–2017: Rietumu–Delfin
- 2018: Amore & Vita–Prodir
- 2019: Interpro Cycling Academy
- 2020: Amore & Vita–Prodir
- 2022: Meiyo CCN Pro Cycling
- 2023–: Hengxiang Cycling Team

Māris Bogdanovičs (born 19 November 1991 in Dobele) is a Latvian cyclist, who currently rides for UCI Continental team FNIX–SCOM–Hengxiang Cycling Team.

== Major results ==
2014
3rd Mayor Cup
7th Central European Tour Budapest GP
7th Banja Luka–Belgrade II
2015
9th Odessa Grand Prix 1
2016
1st Overall Baltic Chain Tour

1st Points classification
1st Stage 2

2nd Tour of Yancheng Coastal Wetlands
5th Vuelta a La Rioja
8th Memoriał Henryka Łasaka
9th Overall Tour of Estonia
2017
Tour of Fuzhou

1st Points classification
1st Stages 2 & 5

Tour of China II

1st Points classification
1st Stages 5

2nd Overall Baltic Chain Tour

1st Stage 1

5th Overall Dookoła Mazowsza
5th Puchar Ministra Obrony Narodowej
6th Overall Tour of Estonia
6th Memorial Grundmanna I Wizowskiego
2019
1st Stage 2 Tour de Tochigi
2020
National Road Championships

2nd Time trial
3rd Road race

4th Overall Baltic Chain Tour
2021
National Road Championships

3rd Road race
4th Time trial
