= Peeter Pruus =

Estonian cyclist

Personal information
- Born: 16 July 1989 (age 37) Rapla, then part of Estonian SSR, Soviet Union

Cycling career
- Sport: Cycling
- Disciplines: Road; Mountain biking
- Role: Rider

Professional teams
- 2012–2017: Rietumu–Delfin
- 2021: Torpado Südtirol International

Peeter Pruus (born 16 July 1989) is an Estonian cyclist, who last rode for UCI Mountain Bike Team Torpado Südtirol International.

== Major results ==
2014
5th Time trial, National Road Championships
2015
1st Overall Tour of Borneo

1st Mountains classification
1st Stage 5

9th Memoriał Henryka Łasaka
10th Puchar Uzdrowisk Karpackich
10th Memorial Grundmanna I Wizowskiego
2016
1st Cross-country marathon, European Mountain Bike Championships
2nd Puchar Uzdrowisk Karpackich
5th Overall Baltic Chain Tour
2017
6th Overall Tour of China II
7th Overall Tour of Estonia

1st Mountains classification

8th Szlakiem Wielkich Jezior
2019
2nd Road race, National Road Championships
3rd Cross-country marathon, UEC European Mountain Bike Championships
6th Overall Tour of Estonia
2020
National Mountain Bike Championships

1st Cross-country
1st Cross-country marathon

2022
7th Overall Tour of Estonia
