= Krists Neilands =

Latvian cyclist

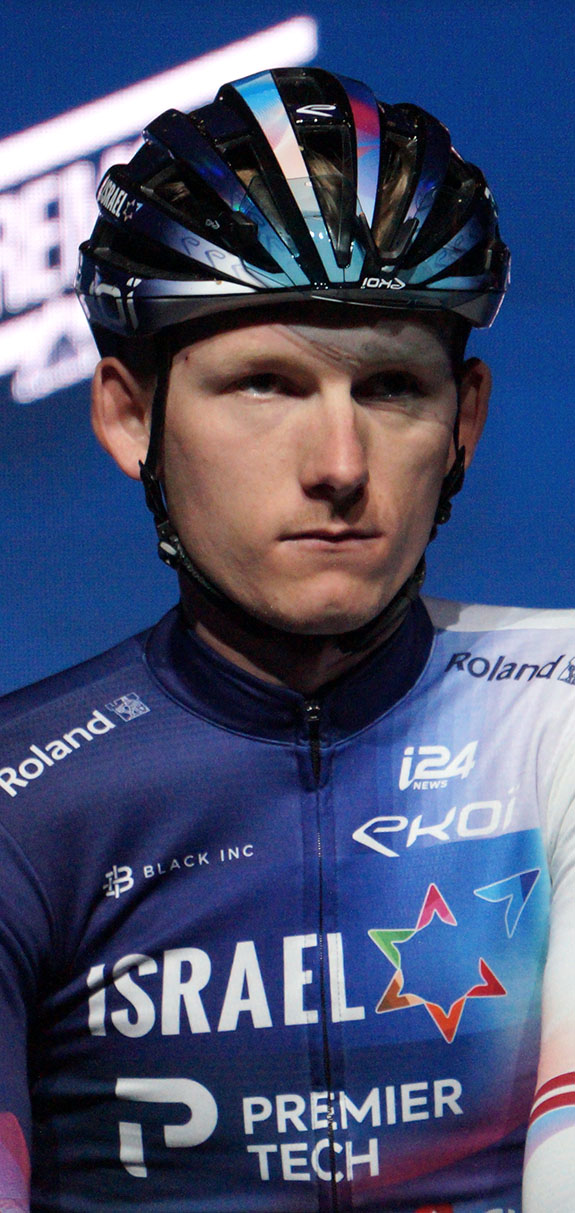
- Neilands in 2023

Personal information
- Full name: Krists Neilands
- Born: 18 August 1994 (age 32) Kuldīga, Latvia
- Height: 1.89 m (6 ft 2 in)
- Weight: 69 kg (152 lb)

Cycling career
- Sport: Cycling
- Current team: NSN Cycling Team
- Discipline: Road
- Role: Rider

Professional teams
- 2013–2015: Rietumu–Delfin
- 2016: Axeon–Hagens Berman
- 2017–: Israel Cycling Academy

Major wins
- One-day races and Classics National Road Race Championships (2017, 2018) National Time Trial Championships (2019)

Krists Neilands (born 18 August 1994) is a Latvian cyclist, who rides for UCI ProTeam NSN Cycling Team.

== Career ==
=== Israel Cycling Academy (2017–present) ===
In 2017, Kuldīga-born Neilands won the Latvian National Road Race Championships, and stage 5 at the Tour d'Azerbaïdjan. At the 2018 Milan–San Remo, Neilands attacked on the famous Poggio di San Remo climb. He got a small gap to the peloton with Vincenzo Nibali; however, Neilands could not keep up with Nibali, who later won the race, while Neilands finished 23rd. In May 2018, he was named in the startlist for the 2018 Giro d'Italia. He finished the race 73rd overall. In August 2020, he was named in the startlist for the 2020 Tour de France.

Neilands competed in the 2023 Tour de France. On Stage 10, he found himself in a breakaway consisting of 14 riders, which he attacked solo 54 kilometres from the finish. He was caught with 3 kilometres left in the stage, eventually finishing in fourth position behind Pello Bilbao, Georg Zimmermann and Ben O'Connor.

== Major results ==
2011
2nd Time trial, National Junior Road Championships
2012
1st Overall Tour de la Région de Lódz

1st Stage 2

National Junior Road Championships

2nd Time trial
3rd Road race

2013
National Road Championships

3rd Under-23 road race
5th Road race

2014
1st Time trial, National Under-23 Road Championships
8th Memoriał Henryka Łasaka
2015
National Road Championships

1st Under-23 road race
1st Under-23 time trial
2nd Road race

1st Stage 3 Tour of Borneo
5th Overall Podlasie Tour

1st Young rider classification

5th Overall Tour of Hainan
5th Overall GP Liberty Seguros
8th Velothon Wales
2016
National Road Championships

1st Under-23 time trial
5th Road race

5th Overall Carpathian Couriers Race
5th Ronde van Vlaanderen Beloften
8th Overall Baltic Chain Tour
10th Liège–Bastogne–Liège Espoirs
2017 (2 pro wins)
National Road Championships

1st Road race
3rd Time trial

1st Stage 5 Tour d'Azerbaïdjan
6th Overall Okolo Slovenska
8th Overall Baltic Chain Tour
10th Overall Volta a Portugal

1st Young rider classification

2018 (2)
National Road Championships

1st Road race
4th Time trial

1st Dwars door het Hageland
3rd Prueba Villafranca de Ordizia
7th GP Industria & Artigianato di Larciano
9th Overall Herald Sun Tour
2019 (5)
National Road Championships

1st Time trial
4th Road race

1st Overall Tour de Hongrie

1st Mountains classification
1st Stages 2 & 4

1st Grand Prix de Wallonie
2nd Overall Vuelta a Asturias
3rd Overall Arctic Race of Norway

1st Young rider classification

2020
Combativity award Stage 4 Tour de France
2021
6th GP Miguel Induráin
2022
2nd Time trial, National Road Championships
7th Overall Tour de Hongrie
2023
National Road Championships

2nd Road race
2nd Time trial

5th Grand Prix La Marseillaise
Combativity award Stage 10 Tour de France

=== Grand Tour general classification results timeline ===
Grand Tour	2018	2019	2020	2021	2022	2023
Giro d'Italia	73	100	—	DNF	—	—
Tour de France	—	—	85	—	79	50
Vuelta a España	Has not contested during his career					

Legend
—	Did not compete
DNF	Did not finish
NH	Not held
