= Kalvis Eisaks =

Latvian cyclist

Personal information
- Born: 7 March 1983 (age 43) Riga, Latvia

Cycling career
- Sport: Cycling
- Discipline: Road
- Role: Rider

Professional team
- 2005–2008: Rietumu Bank

Kalvis Eisaks (born 7 March 1983, in Riga) is a Latvian cyclist.

== Palmares ==
2004
1st U23 European Road Race Championships
2nd National Time Trial Championships
2008
2nd National Road Race Championships
4th Grand Prix de la Ville de Lillers
