= Oļegs Meļehs =

Latvian cyclist

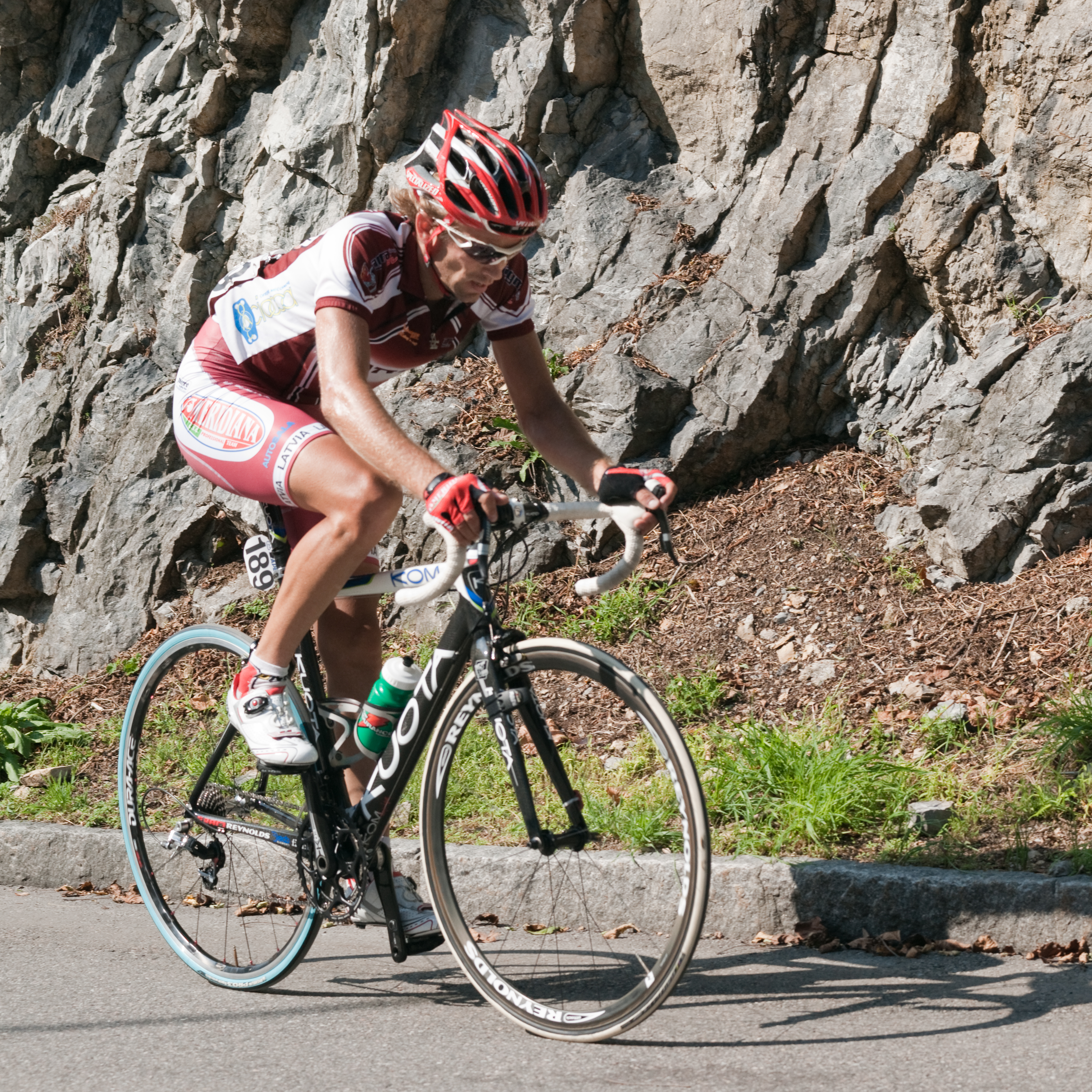

Personal information
- Born: 24 March 1982 (age 44) Rīga, Latvia

Cycling career
- Sport: Cycling
- Discipline: Road
- Role: Rider

Professional teams
- 2005–2007: Rietumu Banka–Riga
- 2008: Dynatek–Latvia
- 2009: Meridiana–Kalev Chocolate
- 2010: Meridiana–Kamen

Major wins
- National Road Race Champion (2004, 2009)

Oļegs Meļehs (born 24 March 1982) is a Latvian former professional road cyclist. In 2004 and 2009 he won the Latvian National Road Race Championships.

In 2010 Meļehs suffered a serious back injury.

== Palmares ==
2003
3rd National Road Race Championships
2004
1st National Road Race Championships
1st National Time Trial Championships
2005
2nd National Time Trial Championships
2006
2nd National Road Race Championships
2nd National Time Trial Championships
2007
2nd National Road Race Championships
2nd National Time Trial Championships
3rd De Vlaamse Pijl
2008
1st Grand Prix of Moscow
2nd National Time Trial Championships
2009
1st National Road Race Championships
