= Emīls Liepiņš =

Latvian cyclist

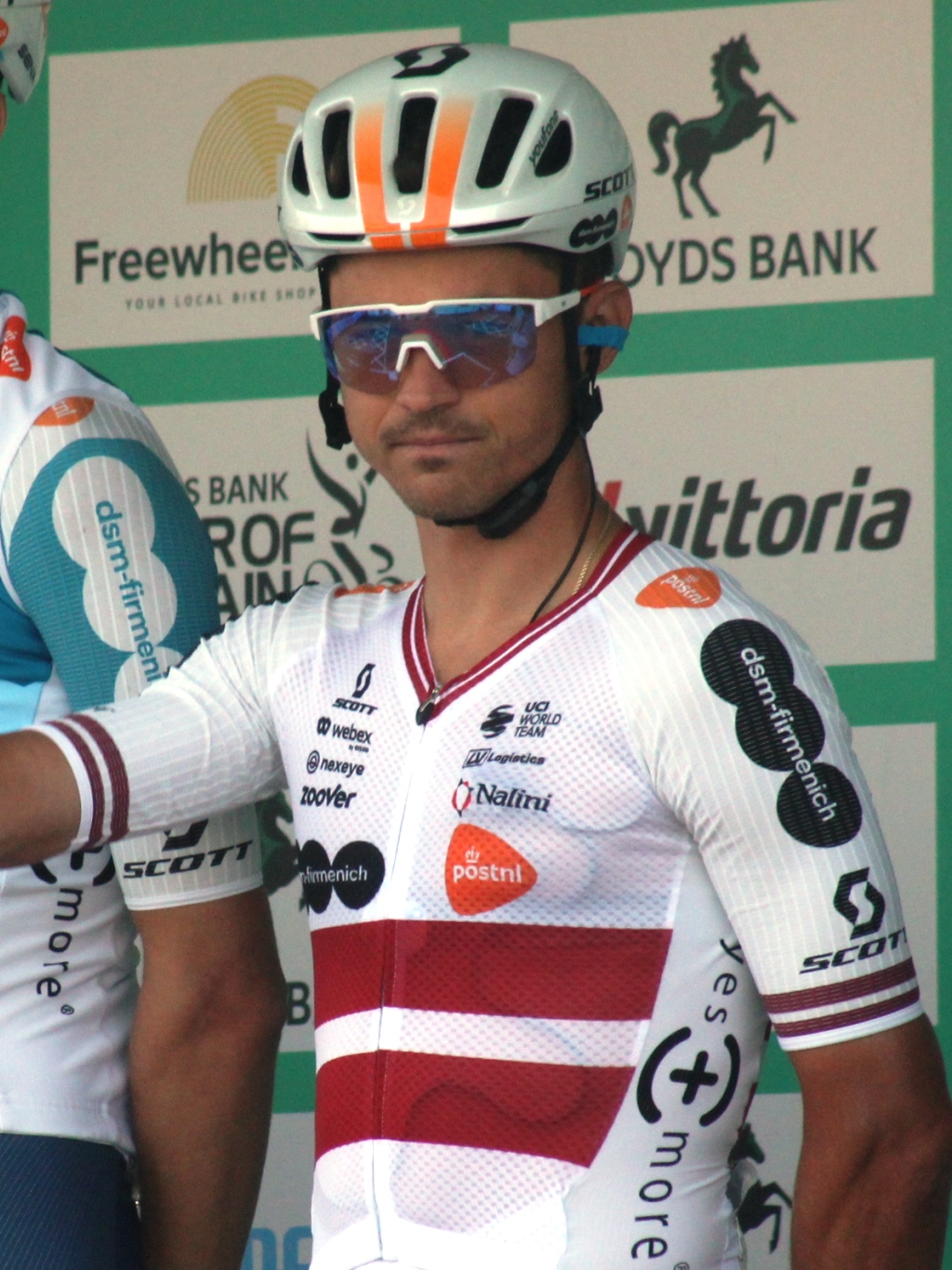
- Liepiņš at the 2024 Tour of Britain

Personal information
- Full name: Emīls Liepiņš
- Born: 29 October 1992 (age 33) Dobele, Latvia
- Height: 1.75 m (5 ft 9 in)
- Weight: 67 kg (148 lb)

Cycling career
- Sport: Cycling
- Current team: Pinarello–Q36.5 Pro Cycling Team
- Discipline: Road
- Role: Rider
- Rider type: Sprinter

Professional teams
- 2011: Alpha Baltic–Unitymarathons.com
- 2012: Rietumu–Delfin
- 2013: Alpha Baltic–Unitymarathons.com
- 2014–2017: Rietumu–Delfin
- 2017: Delko–Marseille Provence KTM (stagiaire)
- 2018: ONE Pro Cycling
- 2019: Wallonie Bruxelles
- 2020–2023: Trek–Segafredo
- 2024: Team dsm–firmenich PostNL
- 2025–: Q36.5 Pro Cycling Team

Major wins
- One-day races and Classics National Road Race Championships (2022, 2023, 2024)

Emīls Liepiņš (born 29 October 1992 in Dobele) is a Latvian cyclist, who currently rides for UCI ProTeam Pinarello–Q36.5 Pro Cycling Team. In October 2020, he was named in the startlist for the 2020 Vuelta a España.

== Major results ==
2012
3rd Jurmala Grand Prix
2014
3rd Overall Tour of Estonia
2016
3rd Tour of Yancheng Coastal Wetlands
5th Minsk Cup
10th Grand Prix Minsk
2017
3rd Overall Tour of Hainan
3rd Overall Dookoła Mazowsza
3rd Minsk Cup
2018 (1 pro win)
1st Overall Baltic Chain Tour

1st Points classification
1st Stage 2

1st Poreč Trophy
1st Heistse Pijl
1st Stage 3 Istrian Spring Trophy
4th GP Izola
4th Minsk Cup
5th Grand Prix Minsk
8th Rutland–Melton CiCLE Classic
2019 (1)
1st Stage 1a Settimana Internazionale di Coppi e Bartali
National Road Championships

3rd Time trial
5th Road race

4th Ronde van Drenthe
4th Ronde van Limburg
6th Tour de l'Eurométropole
8th Scheldeprijs
10th Circuit de Wallonie
2020
6th Trofeo Campos, Porreres, Felanitx, Ses Salines
2021
2nd Time trial, National Road Championships
2022 (1)
National Road Championships

1st Road race
3rd Time trial

2nd Serenissima Gravel
9th Grand Prix de Fourmies
2023 (1)
National Road Championships

1st Road race
3rd Time trial

2024 (1)
National Road Championships

1st Road race
2nd Time trial

5th Bredene Koksijde Classic
9th Surf Coast Classic
2026
5th Circuit de Wallonie
10th Hong Kong Cyclothon

=== Grand Tour general classification results timeline ===
Grand Tour	2020
Giro d'Italia	—
Tour de France	—
Vuelta a España	124

Legend
—	Did not compete
DNF	Did not finish
