= Andris Vosekalns =

Latvian cyclist (born 1992)

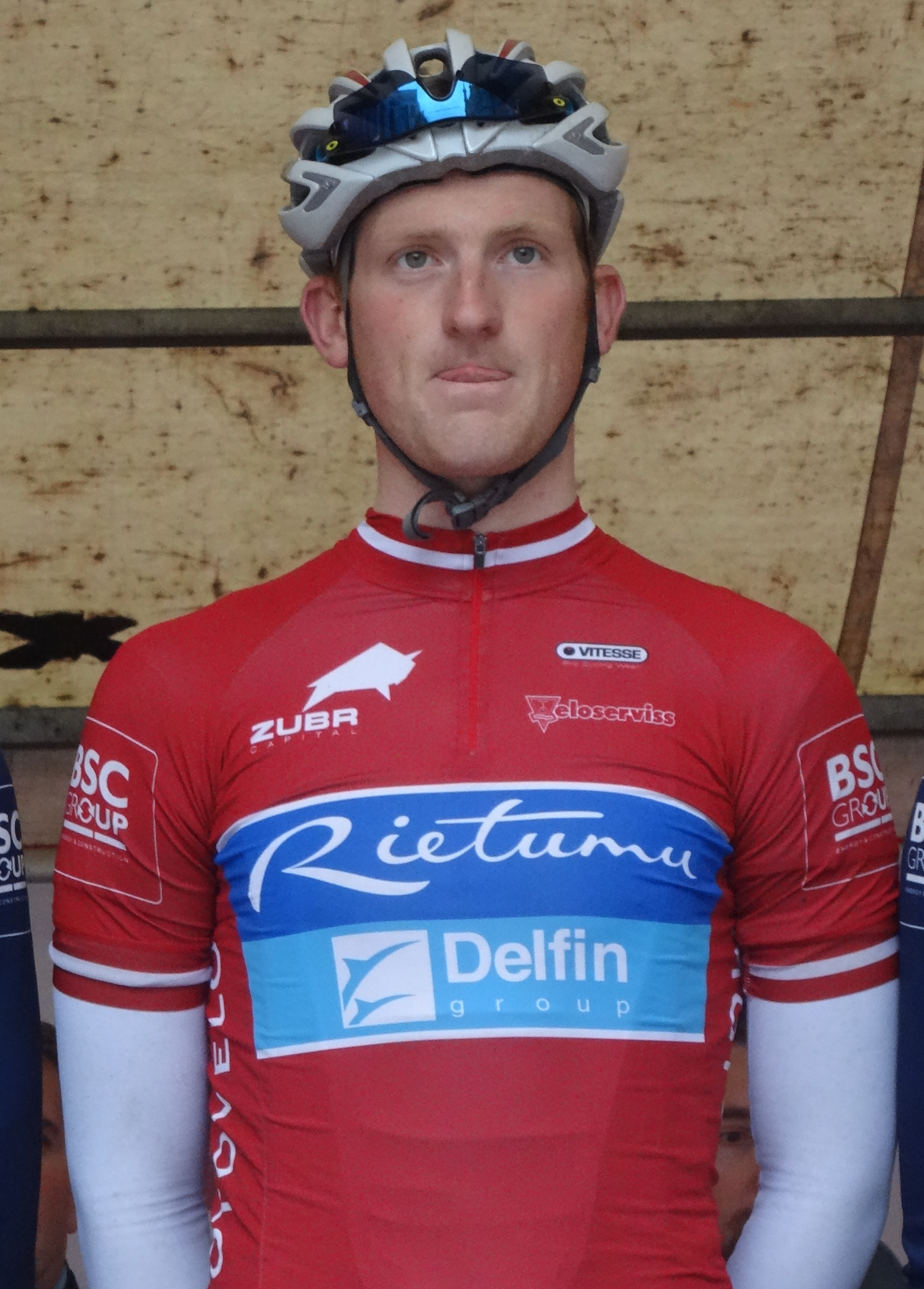
- Vosekalns in 2014.

Personal information
- Full name: Andris Vosekalns
- Born: 26 June 1992 (age 34) Alūksne, Latvia

Cycling career
- Sport: Cycling
- Discipline: Road
- Role: Rider

Professional teams
- 2011: Alpha Baltic–Unitymarathons.com
- 2012–2017: Rietumu–Delfin
- 2018–2024: Hengxiang Cycling Team

Major wins
- National Road Race Championships (2014)

Andris Vosekalns (born 26 June 1992) is a Latvian professional road cyclist, who last rode for UCI Continental team Hengxiang Cycling Team. In 2014 he won the Latvian National Road Race Championships.

== Major results ==
2010
National Junior Road Championships

1st Road race
1st Time trial

2nd Overall Tour De La Région De Lodz
2011
2nd Time trial, National Under-23 Road Championships
4th Overall Baltic Chain Tour
2012
2nd Time trial, National Under-23 Road Championships
4th Tallinn–Tartu GP
4th Riga Grand Prix
2014
National Road Championships

1st Road race
2nd Under-23 time trial

2015
5th Minsk Cup
2017
1st Mountains classification Course Cycliste de Solidarnosc et des Champions Olympiques
2nd Szlakiem Wielkich Jezior
4th Overall Baltic Chain Tour
5th Grand Prix Doliny Baryczy Milicz
6th Road race, National Road Championships
8th Puchar Ministra Obrony Narodowej
2018
7th Time trial, National Road Championships
2019
10th Road race, National Road Championships
