= Juris Silovs (cyclist) =

Latvian cyclist

Personal information
- Born: January 27, 1973 (age 53) Dobele, Soviet Union

Cycling career
- Sport: Cycling
- Current team: Retired
- Discipline: Road
- Role: Rider

Professional teams
- 1997: Schauff–Öschelbronn
- 1998–1999: home–Jack & Jones
- 2000–2001: Cofidis

Juris Silovs (born 27 January 1973 in Dobele) is a Latvian former professional racing cyclist. He ended his professional career on 30 June 2001. He competed in the road race at the 1996 Summer Olympics, and finished in 31st place.

== Major results ==
1996
1st Stage 5 Teleflex Tour
1997
1st National Road Race Championships
1st Stage 7 Teleflex Tour
1st Stage 4 Regio-Tour
1st Stage 1 Hofbrau Cup
5th National Time Trial Championships
1998
1st National Road Race Championships
2nd National Time Trial Championships
4th Scheldeprijs
5th Cholet-Pays de Loire
1999
2nd National Road Race Championships
2nd Cholet-Pays de Loire
6th Gent–Wevelgem
6th National Time Trial Championships
6th Scheldeprijs
7th Veenendaal–Veenendaal
8th Overall Tour de l'Oise
10th E3 Harelbeke
2001
2nd National Road Race Championships
