= Arvis Piziks =

Latvian cyclist

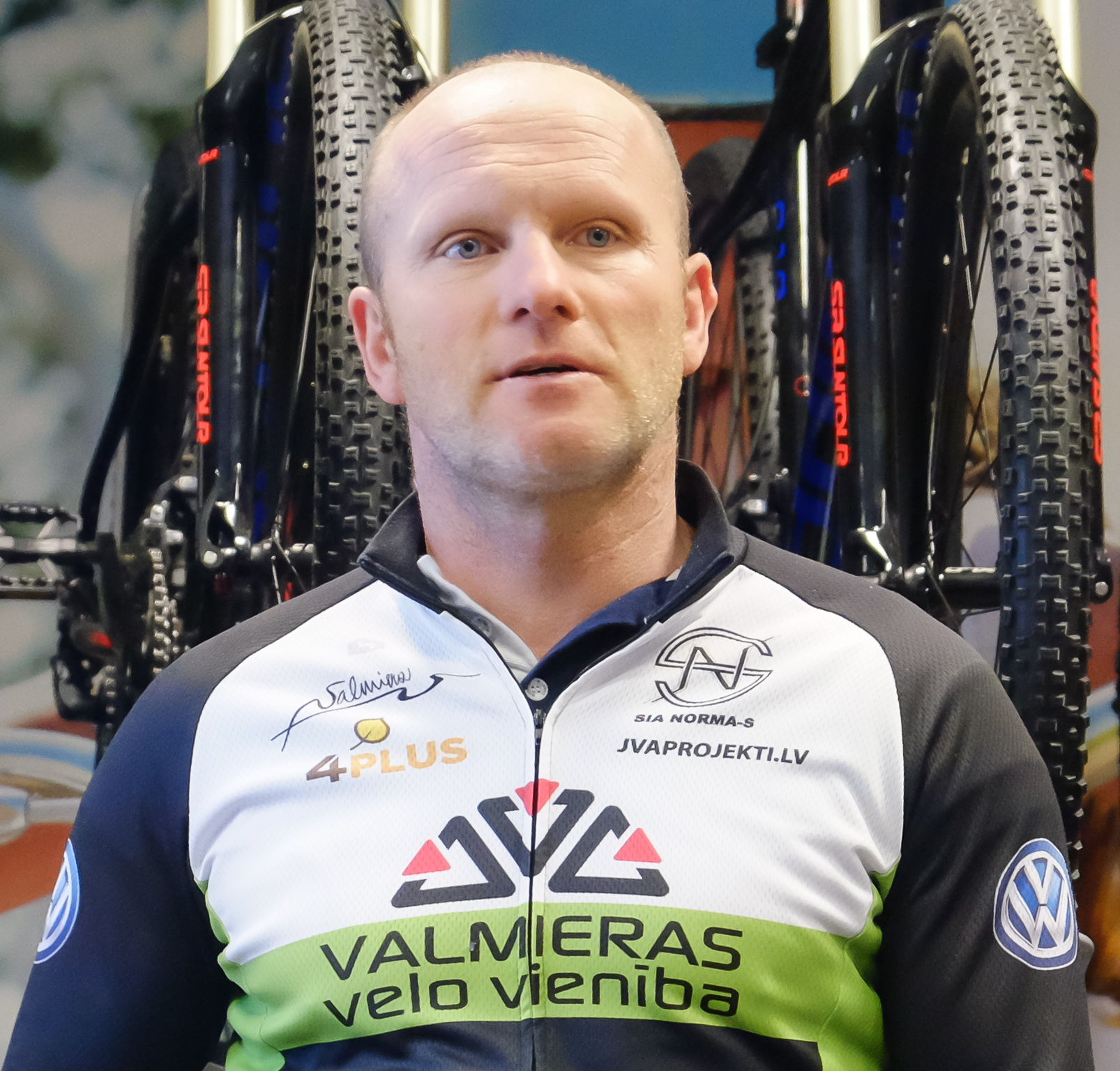
- Piziks in 2017

Personal information
- Born: 12 September 1969 (age 57) Gulbene, Latvia

Cycling career
- Sport: Cycling
- Discipline: Road

Professional teams
- 1994: Trident–Schick
- 1995–1997: Novell–Decca–Colnago
- 1998–2003: home–Jack & Jones

Arvis Piziks (born 12 September 1969) is a Latvian former professional road bicycle racer. He won the National Road Race Championships in 2000. He rode at three Olympic Games.

== Major results ==
1989
2nd Overall FBD Insurance Rás
1991
1st Stage 4 Tour de Liège
2nd Overall Circuit du Hainut

1st Stage 3

1992
1st Overall Cinturón a Mallorca

1st Stage 2

1st Stage 2 Tour of Sweden
1st Paris–Tours Espoirs
8th Road race, Summer Olympics
1993
1st Lancaster Classic
1st Prologue & Stage 1b Grand Prix Guillaume Tell
5th Amateur road race, World Road Championships
1994
1st Overall Grand Prix François-Faber

1st Stage 2

1st Internatie Reningelst
1st Stage 7b Tour de Normandie
2nd Overall Circuit Franco Belge

1st Stages 4 & 6

3rd Overall Tour of Sweden

1st Stage 4

3rd Kattekoers
1995
2nd Grand Prix of Aargau Canton
2nd Druivenkoers Overijse
3rd De Kustpijl
10th Grand Prix de Plouay
1996
1st Stage 4 Tour du Limousin
1st Stage 1 Tour DuPont
1st Stages 2 & 5 Herald Sun Tour
2nd Veenendaal–Veenendaal
1997
3rd National Time Trial Championships
3rd Veenendaal–Veenendaal
1998
1st Stage 2A Herald Sun Tour
1st Stage 5 3-Länder-Tour
2nd National Road Race Championships
3rd National Time Trial Championships
4th Omloop Mandel-Leie-Schelde
6th GP Arhus
7th Omloop Het Volk
8th GP Midtbank
10th Veenendaal–Veenendaal
1999
2nd GP Midtbank
2nd Kampioenschap van Vlaanderen
3rd National Time Trial Championships
4th National Road Race Championships
4th Grote Prijs Jef Scherens
6th Paris–Bruxelles
8th Kuurne–Brussels–Kuurne
8th GP Arhus
2000
1st National Road Race Championships
1st GP Arhus
1st Stage 1 Four Days of Dunkirk
10th Grote Prijs Jef Scherens
2001
2nd National Time Trial Championships
2nd GP Herning
2nd Overall Tour de Picardie
2nd First Union Classic
3rd GP Arhus
3rd Dwars door Vlaanderen
4th Gent–Wevelgem
2002
2nd National Road Race Championships
2nd National Time Trial Championships

=== Grand Tour results ===
Grand Tour	1995	1996	1997	1998	1999	2000	2001	2002
Giro d'Italia	—	—	—	—	—	—	—	—
Tour de France	91	DNF	—	—	—	93	—	152
Vuelta a España	—	—	—	—	—	—	—	—

Legend
—	Did not compete
DNF	Did not finish
