= Deins Kaņepējs =

Latvian cyclist (born 1995)

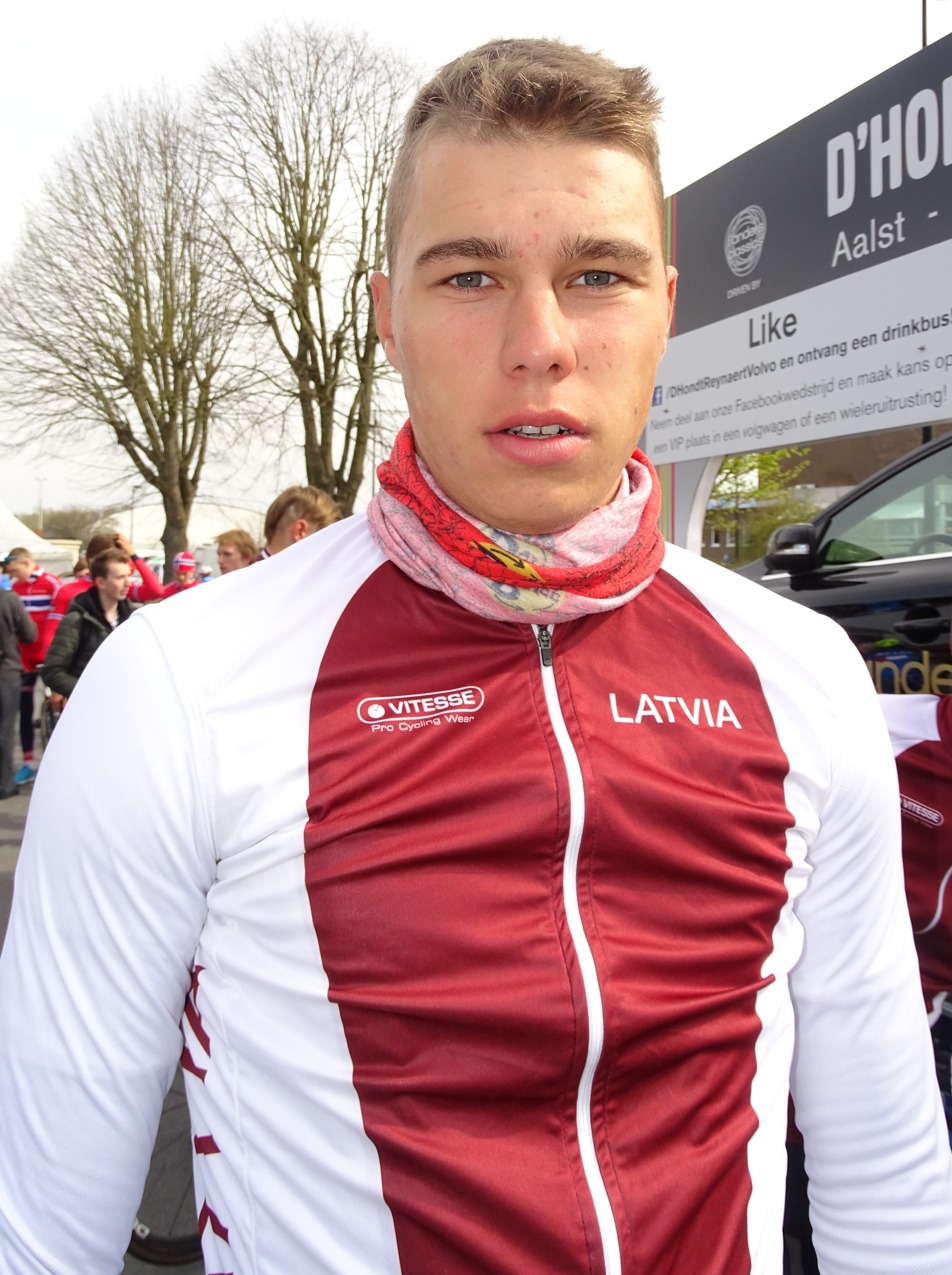
- Kaņepējs in 2016

Personal information
- Full name: Deins Kaņepējs
- Born: 5 October 1995 (age 31) Pļaviņas, Latvia

Cycling career
- Sport: Cycling
- Discipline: Road
- Role: Rider

Professional teams
- 2014: Alpha Baltic–Unitymarathons.com
- 2015–2017: Rietumu–Delfin
- 2018: Vitus Pro Cycling Team
- 2019: Amore & Vita–Prodir

Deins Kaņepējs (born 5 October 1995 in Pļaviņas) is a Latvian cyclist, who last rode for UCI Continental team Amore & Vita–Prodir.

== Major results ==
2015
3rd Road race, National Under-23 Road Championships
2016
4th Memoriał Romana Siemińskiego
9th Overall Tour of China II
2017
2nd Overall Tour of Estonia
4th Road race, National Road Championships
