= Normunds Lasis =

Latvian bicycle racer

Personal information
- Born: 25 February 1985 (age 41)

Cycling career
- Sport: Cycling
- Current team: Retired
- Discipline: Road
- Role: Rider

Professional teams
- 2005–2007: Rietumu Banka–Riga
- 2008: Dynatek–Latvia

Normunds Lasis (born 25 February 1985) is a Latvian former cyclist.

== Palmares ==
2004
2nd National Road Race Championships
2005
1st Prologue Tour of Greece
3rd National Road Race Championships
2006
1st Mayor Cup
2007
1st Stage 1 Triptyque des Monts et Châteaux
2008
1st National Road Race Championships
1st Riga Grand Prix
1st Stages 3, 4 & 6b Tour of Bulgaria
2009
1st Banja Luka-Belgrade I
