= Riga Grand Prix =

Cycling race held in Riga, Latvia

Race details
- Date: June
- Region: Riga, Latvia
- Discipline: Road
- Competition: UCI Europe Tour
- Type: One-day race

History
- First edition: 2006
- Editions: 8
- Final edition: 2013
- First winner: Sergey Kolesnikov (RUS)
- Most wins: No repeat winners
- Final winner: Francesco Chicchi (ITA)

The Riga Grand Prix was a one day cycling race held in Riga, Latvia. It was part of UCI Europe Tour in category 1.2 from 2006 to 2012 and was upgraded to 1.1 in 2013.

== Winners ==
Year	Country	Rider	Team
2006	Russia	Sergey Kolesnikov	Omnibike Dynamo Moscow
2007	Latvia	Gatis Smukulis	Vélo-Club La Pomme Marseille
2008	Latvia	Normunds Lasis	Dynatek–Latvia
2009	Latvia	Herberts Pudāns	
2010	Latvia	Toms Skujiņš	
2011	Latvia	Andris Vosekalns	Alpha Baltic–Unitymarathons.com
2012	Latvia	Andžs Flaksis	Chipotle–First Solar Development Team
2013	Italy	Francesco Chicchi	Vini Fantini–Selle Italia
