= Latvian National Time Trial Championships =

Time trial in the Latvian National Cycling Championship

The Latvian National Time Trial Championships is a time trial race that takes place inside the Latvian National Cycling Championship, and decides the best cyclist in this type of race.

== Multiple winners ==
=== Men ===
Wins	Name	Years
10	Raivis Belohvoščiks	2000, 2001, 2002, 2003, 2005, 2006, 2007, 2008, 2009, 2010
6	Gatis Smukulis	2011, 2012, 2013, 2014, 2015, 2016
3	Dainis Ozols	1997, 1998, 1999
3	Toms Skujiņš	2018, 2021, 2022

=== Women ===
Wins	Name	Years
7	Dana Rožlapa	2012, 2013, 2014, 2019, 2020, 2021, 2022
4	Lija Laizāne	2015, 2016, 2017, 2018

== Men ==
=== Elite ===
Year	Gold	Silver	Bronze
2022	Toms Skujiņš	Krists Neilands	Emīls Liepiņš
2021	Toms Skujiņš	Emīls Liepiņš	Andris Vosekalns
2020	Andris Vosekalns	Māris Bogdanovičs	Vitālijs Korņilovs
2019	Krists Neilands	Aleksejs Saramotins	Ēriks Toms Gavars
2018	Toms Skujiņš	Gatis Smukulis	Aleksejs Saramotins
2017	Aleksejs Saramotins	Toms Skujiņš	Krists Neilands
2016	Gatis Smukulis	Aleksejs Saramotins	Toms Skujiņš
2015	Gatis Smukulis	Aleksejs Saramotins	Krists Neilands
2014	Gatis Smukulis	Aleksejs Saramotins	Andžs Flaksis
2013	Gatis Smukulis	Aleksejs Saramotins	Ervīns Smoļins
2012	Gatis Smukulis	Aleksejs Saramotins	Andžs Flaksis
2011	Gatis Smukulis	Aleksejs Saramotins	Vitālijs Korņilovs
2010	Raivis Belohvoščiks	Aleksejs Saramotins	Gatis Smukulis
2009	Raivis Belohvoščiks	Aleksejs Saramotins	Gatis Smukulis
2008	Raivis Belohvoščiks	Oļegs Meļehs	Vitālijs Korņilovs
2007	Raivis Belohvoščiks	Oļegs Meļehs	Aleksejs Saramotins
2006	Raivis Belohvoščiks	Oļegs Meļehs	Vitālijs Korņilovs
2005	Raivis Belohvoščiks	Oļegs Meļehs	Artūrs Ansons
2004	Oļegs Meļehs	Kalvis Eisaks	Aldis Āboliņš
2003	Raivis Belohvoščiks	Andris Naudužs	Aldis Āboliņš
2002	Raivis Belohvoščiks	Arvis Piziks	Romāns Vainšteins
2001	Raivis Belohvoščiks	Arvis Piziks	Dzintars Ozoliņš
2000	Raivis Belohvoščiks	Dainis Ozols	Andris Špehts
1999	Dainis Ozols	Andris Špehts	Arvis Piziks
1998	Dainis Ozols	Juris Silovs	Arvis Piziks
1997	Dainis Ozols	Egons Rozenfelds	Arvis Piziks

=== U23 ===
Year	Gold	Silver	Bronze
2022	Rodžers Petaks	Matīss Kaļveršs	Alekss Krasts
2021	Rodžers Petaks	Kristers Ansons	Pauls Rubenis
2020	Alekss Krasts	Mareks Balodis	Jānis Sēlis
2019	Ēriks Toms Gavars	Kristaps Siltumēns	Kristaps Pelčers
2018	Ēriks Toms Gavars	Kristers Ansons	Kristaps Pelčers
2017	Mārcis Kalniņš	Deins Kaņepējs	Ēriks Toms Gavars
2016	Krists Neilands	Ēriks Toms Gavars	Klāvs Rubenis
2015	Aleksandrs Rubļevskis	Valters Čakšs	Pēteris Janevics
2014	Krists Neilands	Andris Vosekalns	Mārtiņš Jirgensons
2013	Andžs Flaksis	Armands Bēcis	Pauls Zvirbulis
2012	Andžs Flaksis	Andris Vosekalns	Andris Smirnovs
2011	Andžs Flaksis	Andris Vosekalns	Toms Skujiņš
2010	Indulis Bekmanis	Andžs Flaksis	Toms Skujiņš
2009	Indulis Bekmanis	Ervīns Smoļins	Reinis Andrijanovs
2008	Gatis Smukulis		
2007			
2006	Gatis Smukulis		

== Women ==
=== Elite ===
Year	Gold	Silver	Bronze
2022	Dana Rožlapa	Lija Laizāne	Anastasia Carbonari
2021	Dana Rožlapa	Lija Laizāne	Lina Svarinska
2020	Dana Rožlapa	Madara Aboma	Agnese Patricija Ozola
2019	Dana Rožlapa	Lija Laizāne	Daniela Leitāne
2018	Lija Laizāne	Viktorija Sipovica	Helēna Ērgle
2017	Lija Laizāne	Lelde Ardave	Viktorija Sipovica
2016	Lija Laizāne	Endija Rutule	—N/a
2015	Lija Laizāne	Madara Fūrmane	—N/a
2014	Dana Rožlapa	Vita Heine	Lija Laizāne
2013	Dana Rožlapa	Vita Heine	Jelena Dovgaluk
2012	Dana Rožlapa	Lija Laizāne	Lelde Ardava
2011	Jelena Dovgaluk	Anda Savlenko	Lija Laizāne
2010	Ivanda Eiduka	Jelena Dovgaluk	Anda Savlenko
