= Rietumu Banka–Riga =

Latvian cycling team

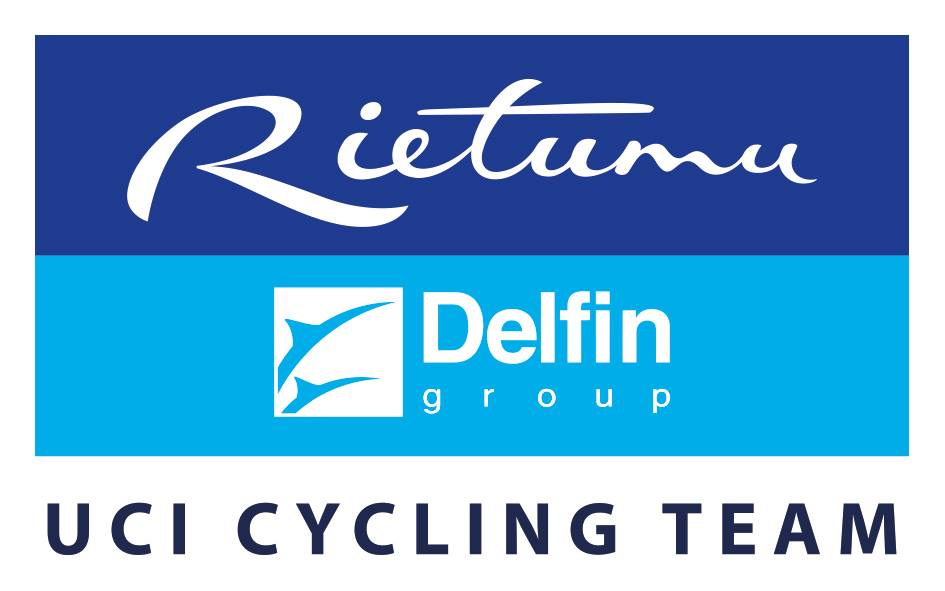

Team information
- UCI code: RBR
- Registered: Latvia
- Founded: 2004
- Disbanded: 2017
- Discipline: Road / Mountain Bike
- Status: UCI Continental team

Key personnel
- General manager: Linards Veide
- Team manager: Toms Flaksis

Team name history
- 2002–2009 2012–2016 2017: Rietumu Banka–Riga; Rietumu–Delfin; Rietumu Banka–Riga
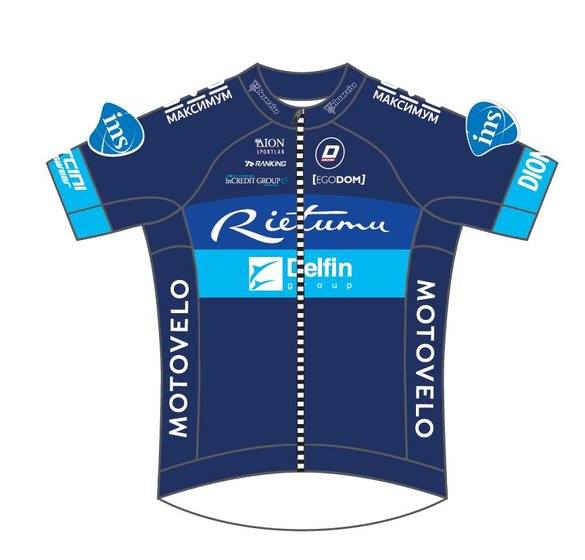
Rietumu Banka–Riga jersey
Jersey

Rietumu Banka–Riga (UCI team code: RBR) is a Latvian cycling team established in 2002 in order to develop Latvian cyclists to an international level. Its main sponsor is Rietumu Banka. During next year`s former professional riders Jaan Kirsipuu and Arvis Piziks worked as sports directors. It was a UCI Continental team until the end of the 2008 season, when team shifted main focus on XC MTB racing. In 2012 the team is once again registered at UCI level. The most famous riders of the team have been Aleksejs Saramotins, 2015 world time trial champion Vasil Kiryienka, and 2015 UCI America Tour winner Toms Skujiņš.

The team disbanded at the end of the 2017 season.

== Major wins ==
2005
Stages 1a & 2 The Paths of King Nikola, Normunds Lasis
Prologue (ITT) Tour of Greece, Normunds Lasis
Stage 3 Tour of Greece, Gusts Eisaks
Latvia Road Race Championships, Aleksejs Saramotins
Overall Giro della Toscana, Sergey Firsanov
2006
Mayor Cup, Normunds Lasis
Latvia Road Race Championships, Aleksejs Saramotins
Belarus Time Trial Championships, Vasil Kiryienka
Stage 6 Course de la Solidarité Olympique, Vasil Kiryienka
Stage 5a Tour of Bulgaria, Sergey Firsanov
2007
Stage 1 Triptyque des Monts et Châteaux, Normunds Lasis
Memorial Oleg Dyachenko, Sergey Firsanov
Latvia Road Race Championships, Aleksejs Saramotins
Puchar Ministra Obrony Narodowej, Tarmo Raudsepp
Stage 4 Tour of Croatia, Aleksejs Saramotins
2008
Stage 1 Circuit des Ardennes, Aleksejs Saramotins
Stage 4 Rhône-Alpes Isère Tour, Alexander Mironov
Stage 1a Five Rings of Moscow, Mart Ojavee
Tallinn–Tartu GP, Mart Ojavee
Tartu GP, Aleksejs Saramotins
Stage 2 Ringerike GP, Sergey Firsanov
Scandinavian Open Road Race, Aleksejs Saramotins
Stage 3 Okolo Slovenska, Aleksejs Saramotins
Stage 4a Okolo Slovenska, Sergey Firsanov
Lombardia Tour, Aleksejs Saramotins
Overall Way to Pekin, Sergey Firsanov

Stage 1, Alexander Mironov
Stages 2, 3 & 7, Sergey Firsanov
Stage 4, Mart Ojavee
Stage 5, Justas Volungevičius

2011
Scandinavian Race Uppsala, Andžs Flaksis
2012
GP Oued Eddahab, Andris Smirnovs
2013
Stage 2 Tour de Blida, Toms Skujiņš
Latvia Under-23 Road Race Championships, Toms Skujiņš
Prologue Tour de Guadeloupe, Team time trial
Stage 6 Baltic Chain Tour, Andris Smirnovs
2014
Latvia Under-23 Road Race Championships, Krists Neilands
Latvia Road Race Championships, Andris Vosekalns
2015
Latvia Under-23 Time Trial Championships, Krists Neilands
Stage 1 Tour of China I, Armands Bēcis
Overall Tour de Borneo, Peeter Pruus

Stage 3, Krists Neilands
Stage 5, Peeter Pruus

2016
Overall Baltic Chain Tour, Maris Bogdanovics

Stage 2, Maris Bogdanovics

2017
Latvia Under-23 Time Trial Championships, Marcis Kalnins

== Team roster ==
Rider	Date of birth
Uldis Ālītis (LAT)	25 July 1983 (age 43)
Armands Bēcis (LAT)	16 January 1991 (age 35)
Artūrs Belēvičs (LAT)	3 February 1996 (age 30)
Māris Bogdanovičs (LAT)	19 November 1991 (age 34)
Ēriks Toms Gavars (LAT)	20 April 1997 (age 29)
Marcis Kalnins (LAT)	5 May 1998 (age 28)
Deins Kaņepējs (LAT)	5 October 1995 (age 30)

Rider	Date of birth
Emīls Liepiņš (LAT)	29 October 1992 (age 33)
Viesturs Lukševics (LAT)	16 April 1987 (age 39)
Peeter Pruus (EST)	16 July 1989 (age 37)
Klāvs Rubenis (LAT)	18 January 1997 (age 29)
Dimitriy Sorokin (RUS)	6 June 1982 (age 44)
Tomas Vaitkus (LIT)	4 February 1982 (age 44)
Andris Vosekalns (LAT)	26 June 1992 (age 34)
