= Latvian National Road Race Championships =

National road cycling championship in Latvia

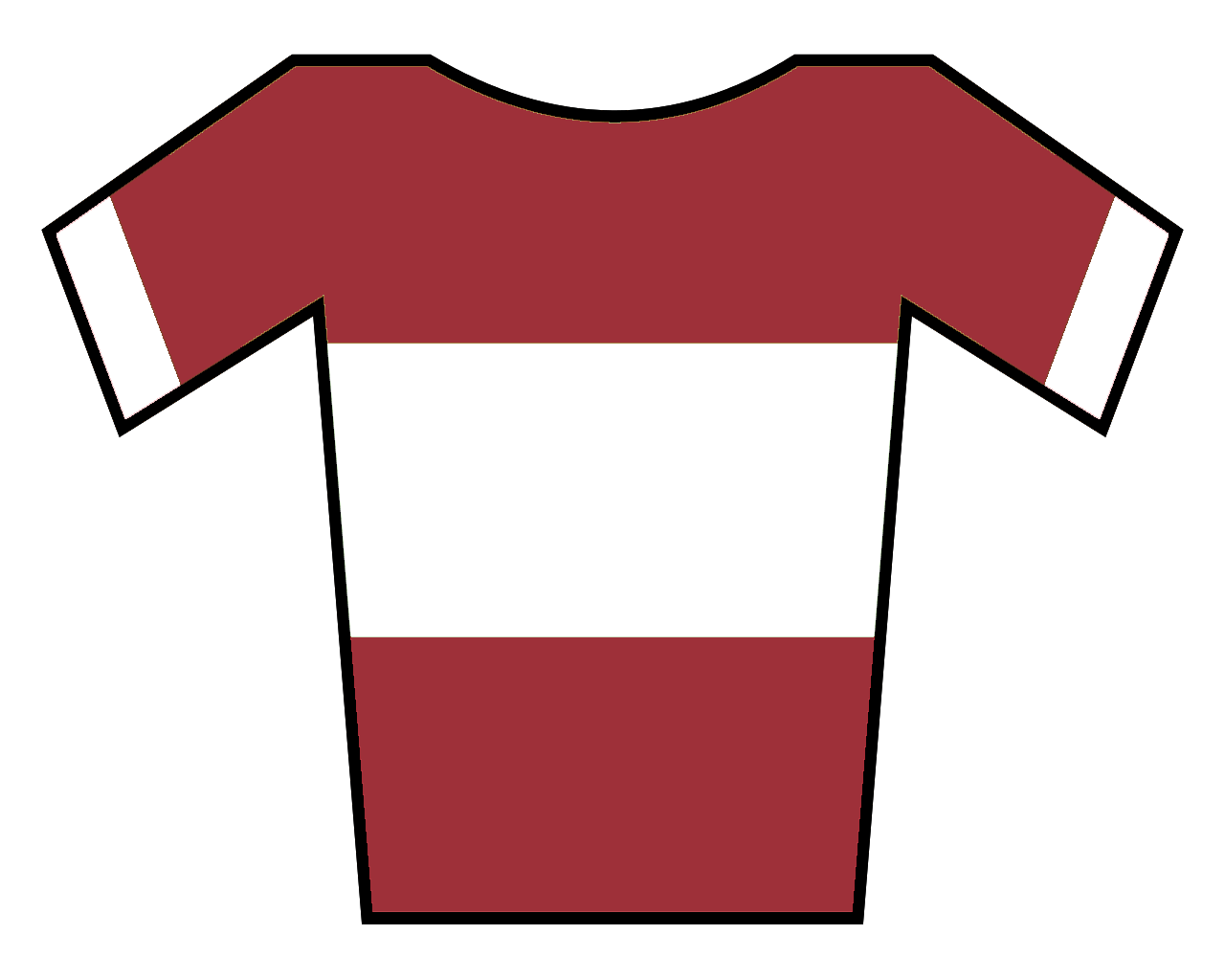

The Latvian National Road Race Championship is a road bicycle race that takes place inside the Latvian National Cycling Championship, and decides the best cyclist in this type of race.

== Multiple winners ==
Wins	Name	Years
7	Aleksejs Saramotins	2005, 2006, 2007, 2010, 2012, 2013, 2015
3	Toms Skujiņš	2019, 2021, 2025
3	Emīls Liepiņš	2022, 2023, 2024
2	Juris Silovs	1997, 1998
2	Oļegs Meļehs	2004, 2009
2	Krists Neilands	2017, 2018

== Men ==
=== Elite ===
Year	Gold	Silver	Bronze
1997	Juris Silovs	Egons Rozenfelds	Armands Baranovskis
1998	Juris Silovs	Arvis Piziks	Romāns Vainšteins
1999	Romāns Vainšteins	Juris Silovs	Raivis Belohvoščiks
2000	Arvis Piziks	Raivis Belohvoščiks	Andris Naudužs
2001	Andris Reiss	Juris Silovs	Raivis Belohvoščiks
2002	Raivis Belohvoščiks	Arvis Piziks	Armands Baranovskis
2003	Andris Naudužs	Mārtiņš Poļakovs	Oļegs Meļehs
2004	Oļegs Meļehs	Normunds Lasis	Aleksejs Saramotins
2005	Aleksejs Saramotins	Gatis Smukulis	Normunds Lasis
2006	Aleksejs Saramotins	Oļegs Meļehs	Daniels Ernestovskis
2007	Aleksejs Saramotins	Oļegs Meļehs	Herberts Pudāns
2008	Normunds Lasis	Kalvis Eisaks	Haralds Pudāns
2009	Oļegs Meļehs	Aleksejs Saramotins	Normunds Zviedris
2010	Aleksejs Saramotins	Gatis Smukulis	Indulis Bekmanis
2011	Mārtiņš Trautmanis	Aleksejs Saramotins	Kristofers Rācenājs
2012	Aleksejs Saramotins	Andžs Flaksis	Indulis Bekmanis
2013	Aleksejs Saramotins	Gatis Smukulis	Toms Skujiņš
2014	Andris Vosekalns	Aleksejs Saramotins	Gatis Smukulis
2015	Aleksejs Saramotins	Krists Neilands	Andris Smirnovs
2016	Gatis Smukulis	Viesturs Lukševics	Toms Skujiņš
2017	Krists Neilands	Kaspars Sergis	Viesturs Lukševics
2018	Krists Neilands	Aleksejs Saramotins	Andžs Flaksis
2019	Toms Skujiņš	Aleksejs Saramotins	Andžs Flaksis
2020	Viesturs Lukševics	Pauls Rubenis	Māris Bogdanovičs
2021	Toms Skujiņš	Andžs Flaksis	Māris Bogdanovičs
2022	Emīls Liepiņš	Andžs Flaksis	Pauls Rubenis
2023	Emīls Liepiņš	Krists Neilands	Toms Skujiņš
2024	Emils Liepins	Māris Bogdanovičs	Karlis Klismets
2025	Toms Skujiņš	Krists Neilands	Kristiāns Belohvoščiks
2026	Mārtiņš Pluto	Kristiāns Belohvoščiks	Māris Bogdanovičs

=== U23 ===
Year	Gold	Silver	Bronze
2006	Gatis Smukulis		
2007			
2008			
2009	Viesturs Lukševics	Rihards Bartuševics	Reinis Andrijanovs
2010	Indulis Bekmanis		
2011			
2012			
2013	Toms Skujiņš	Andžs Flaksis	Krists Neilands
2014	Krists Neilands		
2015	Krists Neilands	Raivis Sarkans	Deins Kaņepējs
2016	Krists Neilands	Klāvs Rubenis	Matīss Riekstiņš
2017	Deins Kaņepējs	Ēriks Toms Gavars	Mārtiņš Pluto
2018	Mārtiņš Pluto	Ēriks Toms Gavars	Kristaps Pelčers
2019	Alekss Jānis Ražinskis	Ēriks Toms Gavars	—N/a
2020	Pauls Rubenis	Alekss Krasts	Oskars Dankbārs
2021	Pauls Rubenis	Alekss Krasts	Kristers Ansons
2022	Alekss Krasts	Matīss Kaļveršs	Kristiāns Belohvoščiks
