= 2008 Astana season =

Cycling team season

2008 Astana season
Manager	Johan Bruyneel
One-day victories	2
Stage race overall victories	8
Stage race stage victories	18
Previous season • Next season

The 2008 season for the Astana cycling team began in January with the Tour Down Under and ended in October with the Giro di Lombardia. As a UCI ProTour team, they were automatically invited and obliged to attend every event in the UCI ProTour.

Astana changed drastically between the 2007 and 2008 seasons, with its former manager Marc Biver replaced by Johan Bruyneel from the dissolved Discovery Channel Pro Cycling Team. Following Bruyneel to Astana were several riders from that team, including Alberto Contador and Levi Leipheimer, who had finished first and third, respectively, in the 2007 Tour de France for Discovery. Numerous riders also left the team, including Matthias Kessler, Andrey Kashechkin, and Alexander Vinokourov, who had all tested positive for doping.

The team's biggest successes in 2008 were the overall victories by Contador in the Giro d'Italia and the Vuelta a España. As the team was barred from competing in the Tour de France that year, as well as other events organized by the Amaury Sport Organisation, Contador was unable to defend his championship from the year before.

Just as the team's competitive season was nearing its end, Lance Armstrong announced that he planned to return to competitive cycling in 2009 after a four-year absence. As Bruyneel was Armstrong's team manager for all seven of his Tour de France victories, there was much speculation immediately that Armstrong would sign with Astana in his comeback, which he eventually did.

== 2008 team roster ==
Ages as of January 1, 2008

Rider	Date of birth
Assan Bazayev (KAZ)	February 22, 1981 (aged 26)
Janez Brajkovič (SLO)	December 18, 1983 (aged 24)
Antonio Colóm (ESP)	May 11, 1978 (aged 29)
Alberto Contador (ESP)	December 6, 1982 (aged 25)
Koen de Kort (NED)	September 8, 1982 (aged 25)
Thomas Frei (SUI)	January 19, 1984 (aged 23)
Vladimir Gusev (RUS)	July 4, 1981 (aged 26)
René Haselbacher (AUT)	September 15, 1977 (aged 30)
Chris Horner (USA)	October 23, 1971 (aged 36)
Maxim Iglinskiy (KAZ)	April 18, 1981 (aged 26)
Sergei Ivanov (RUS)	March 5, 1975 (aged 32)
Benoît Joachim (LUX)	January 4, 1976 (aged 31)
Aaron Kemps (AUS)	September 10, 1983 (aged 24)
Roman Kireyev (KAZ)	February 14, 1987 (aged 20)
Andreas Klöden (GER)	June 22, 1975 (aged 32)

Rider	Date of birth
Berik Kupeshov (KAZ)	January 30, 1987 (aged 20)
Levi Leipheimer (USA)	October 24, 1973 (aged 34)
Julien Mazet (FRA)	March 19, 1981 (aged 26)
Andrey Mizurov (KAZ)	March 16, 1973 (aged 34)
Steve Morabito (SUI)	January 30, 1983 (aged 24)
Dmitriy Muravyev (KAZ)	February 11, 1979 (aged 28)
Daniel Navarro (ESP)	July 8, 1983 (aged 24)
Benjamín Noval (ESP)	January 23, 1979 (aged 28)
Sérgio Paulinho (POR)	March 26, 1980 (aged 27)
Grégory Rast (SUI)	January 17, 1980 (aged 27)
José Luis Rubiera (ESP)	January 27, 1973 (aged 34)
Michael Schär (SUI)	September 29, 1986 (aged 21)
Tomas Vaitkus (LTU)	February 4, 1982 (aged 25)
Sergei Yakovlev (KAZ)	April 21, 1976 (aged 31)
Andrey Zeits (KAZ)	December 14, 1986 (aged 21)

Riders who joined the team for the 2008 season

Rider	2007 team
Janez Brajkovič	Discovery Channel
Alberto Contador	Discovery Channel
Vladimir Gusev	Discovery Channel
Chris Horner	Predictor–Lotto
Roman Kireyev	neo-pro
Berik Kupeshov	neo-pro
Levi Leipheimer	Discovery Channel
Benjamín Noval	Discovery Channel
Sérgio Paulinho	Discovery Channel
José Luis Rubiera	Discovery Channel
Thomas Vaitkus	Discovery Channel
Andrey Zeits	neo-pro

Riders who left the team during or after the 2007 season

Rider	2008 team
Igor Abakoumov	Mitsubishi–Jartazi
Maxim Gourov	A-Style Somn
Andrey Kashechkin	none
Matthias Kessler	none
Alexey Kolessov	Ulan
Eddy Mazzoleni	Retired
Gennady Mikhaylov	Mitsubishi–Jartazi
José Antonio Redondo	Andalucía–CajaSur
Paolo Savoldelli	LPR Brakes–Ballan
Evgeniy Sladkov	Centri della Calzatura – Partizan
Alexander Vinokourov	Suspended for doping

== One-day races ==
=== Spring classics ===
By their own admission, Astana does not aim for the classics. The team first participated in Omloop Het Volk on March 1, with Dmitriy Muravyev in 31st their best-placed rider. Sergei Ivanov's 7th in the Amstel Gold Race proved to be one of the team's best results all season, as in the other spring races in which they competed, Kuurne–Brussels–Kuurne, the Tour of Flanders, and Gent–Wevelgem, they did not have a rider place higher than 13th. Due in part to the ban imposed by the Amaury Sport Organisation from participating in races they organized, the team did not compete in Milan–San Remo, Paris–Roubaix, La Flèche Wallonne, Liège–Bastogne–Liège, or other races in which a team of their caliber would normally take part. In March, Tomas Vaitkus earned the team's lone one-day victory of the spring season, winning a sprint finish to the Ronde van het Groene Hart.

=== Fall races ===
The team entered the Clásica de San Sebastián in August, with Contador in 26th their highest-placed finisher. Contador, like many riders in the event, rode it as preparation for the road cycling events at the 2008 Olympic Games. Astana also took part in Vattenfall Cyclassics, the Coppa Sabatini, Paris–Bourges, the Giro dell'Emilia, the Gran Premio Bruno Beghelli, Milano–Torino, and the Giro del Piemonte in September and October, but did not obtain a place higher than 11th (by Janez Brajkovič in the Giro dell'Emilia). In August, Leipheimer and Contador took the top two spots in the Clásica a los Puertos de Guadarrama, a race they rode as preparation for the Vuelta a España.

In the Giro di Lombardia, Astana's final race of the season, they were more successful than they had been most of the season, attaining a fourth podium finish in a one-day race on the year. While Damiano Cunego had broken away from the field with 15 kilometers left to race to win the event, Brajkovič won a sprint over Caisse d'Epargne's Rigoberto Urán for second, and reacted as though he won the race. Chris Horner was also highly placed in the event, finishing seventh.

== Stage races ==
Astana attended the Tour Down Under for the first time in 2008, as it was the first year the event was part of the UCI ProTour. The team was not very competitive in the event, with a fifth place in a sprint finish to Stage 2 from Aaron Kemps as their best stage result. They also led the teams classification after that stage. The team's best-placed rider in the final overall classification was José Luis Rubiera, ranked 31st. The team then attended the Tour of California in February. Leipheimer was the team leader for the event, as he was the defending champion from 2007 with Team Discovery. Leipheimer assumed the race lead after Stage 3, having worked with Rabobank rider Robert Gesink to gain time on the peloton with Gesink claiming the stage win and Leipheimer the overall lead. Leipheimer padded his lead by winning the individual time trial in Solvang two days later and held on to win the Tour itself for the second straight year. While the Tour of California was ongoing, Astana sent another squad to the Volta ao Algarve, with Tomas Vaitkus claiming a win in Stage 2. Rubiera was the victor in early March of the queen stage of the Vuelta a Murcia, a stage which the peloton almost refused to race because of the weather and safety conditions.

Levi Leipheimer riding the prologue time trial of the Tour of California.

With the team disinvited from Paris–Nice and Tirreno–Adriatico, their next stage race was the Volta ao Distrito de Santarém, a race which neither Astana nor Discovery Channel had participated in the year before. The team did not win any stage, though Andreas Klöden finished on the event's final podium, in third. Astana next entered the Vuelta a Castilla y León with a squad that was thought to greatly outclass the squads entered by other teams. Contador won the opening time trial and the mountainous fourth stage en route to winning the race overall. Leipheimer also showed well, finishing 4 seconds off Contador's winning time in the time trial, and falling only on Stage 4, where he rode in support of Contador, to finish in fourth overall.

In April, the team achieved great success in the Vuelta al País Vasco, with Contador winning the opening stage, which had seven categorized climbs, and the final individual time trial, to win the race overall. Just after the tour of the Basque country was the Presidential Cycling Tour of Turkey, an event in which Astana won a stage with Grégory Rast and the points classification with Assan Bazayev. Later in the month, the team sent a squad headed by Leipheimer and Chris Horner to the Tour de Georgia. They did not win any stage, but Leipheimer took third overall, and Antonio Colóm fourth. The team was greatly successful at the Tour de Romandie later in the month, with Maxim Iglinskiy and Klöden both winning stages, and Klöden the race overall. In the Volta a Catalunya, which was concurrent to the Giro d'Italia, the team did not win any stage, with Janez Brajkovič's second in Stage 2 their closest result, though they did win the teams classification.

At the Tour de Luxembourg in June, Rast entered as defending champion and was considered among the favorites, but the team did not win any stage or finish on the podium. Leipheimer won the prologue time trial to the Dauphine Libéré later in the month, and wound up finishing third overall in the race. Klöden next took second overall in the Tour de Suisse, later in June. The following month, Leipheiemer and Horner raced as Astana (though they were the only Astana riders in the event) at the Cascade Cycling Classic, and Leipheimer was able to take the overall win there, largely thanks to a convincing victory in the third stage time trial. On the same day, René Haselbacher won a stage in Tour of Austria. Later in the month, Sergeui Ivanov won the Tour de Wallonie, without winning a stage.

The team sent squads to the Tour de Pologne, Tour de l'Ain, Tour of Ireland, and the Eneco Tour, but did not obtain a stage win, classification win, or podium finish in any of them.

== Grand Tours ==
=== Giro d'Italia ===
Astana was at first not invited to the Giro. Six days before the race began, RCS Sport (the organizers of the Giro) went back on the decision to exclude Astana and extended them a late invitation. This change of heart was at least partly contingent on Contador, Leipheimer, and Klöden participating in the race. Having thought for two months prior that they would not compete in the Giro, most of Astana's riders had planned to take a break during the Tour of Italy, and Contador was actually vacationing on a beach when Bruyneel called him to tell him the team was headed to the Giro.

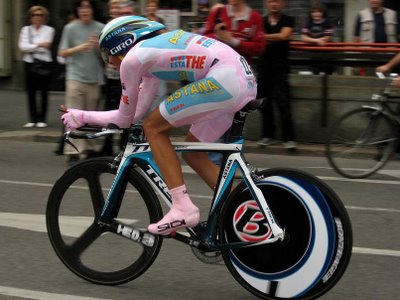
Contador wearing the pink jersey during the 21st stage of the Giro d'Italia.

The team mostly lay low in the race's first week and a half, with only fourth in a sprint from Assan Bazayev in Stage 4 and fifth in Stage 6 by Maxim Iglinsky from a breakaway to show for themselves through nine stages. Contador and Klöden both showed strongly in the Stage 10 individual time trial, with Contador missing the stage win by just 8 seconds (Klöden was third, 20 seconds off Marzio Bruseghin's winning time) and moving from eighth to fourth in the overall classification.

The high mountain Stage 14 into the Italian Alps saw Contador rise to second overall, just five seconds behind race leader Gabriele Bosisio. The next day, Contador finished twelve minutes ahead of Bosisio and took the race leader's pink jersey. His main rival at that point was Riccardo Riccò, who had gained 16 seconds on him that day and was only 33 back overall. Contador padded his lead over Riccò slightly in short time trial in Stage 16, and stayed out of trouble in Stages 17 and 18, stages where the contenders all finished together. The long and mountainous Stage 19 saw Riccò and Danilo Di Luca both put time into Contador with late attacks, but not enough to take the jersey from him. Di Luca found himself effected the next day, losing over five minutes and falling from contention, but Contador and Riccò finished together and were separated by just 4 seconds entering the Stage 21 time trial. Riccò was unable to challenge Contador in the Giro's finale, finishing 68th on the stage and losing close to two minutes to Contador, who was 11th. Though neither Contador himself nor anyone from the team won any stage in the Giro, Contador took the overall victory in the General Classification.

=== Vuelta a España ===
Astana entered the Vuelta with Contador as a big favorite to win the overall title and complete the career sweep of the Grand Tours. Astana's Vuelta actually began with a disappointment, an 8th-place finish in the Stage 1 team time trial, which either they or CSC–Saxo Bank had been thought likeliest to win. After staying out of trouble in sprinters' Stages 2 through 4, Leipheimer won the Stage 5 individual time trial and Contador was fourth, 49 seconds back of him. This gave Leipheimer the race leader's golden jersey by a margin of 2 seconds over Sylvain Chavanel. It was not a lead that Astana intended to defend the next day, however, as Chavanel's Cofidis team drove the peloton to catch the morning breakaway in Stage 6 so Chavanel could get bonus seconds in intermediate sprints to take the jersey, which he did.

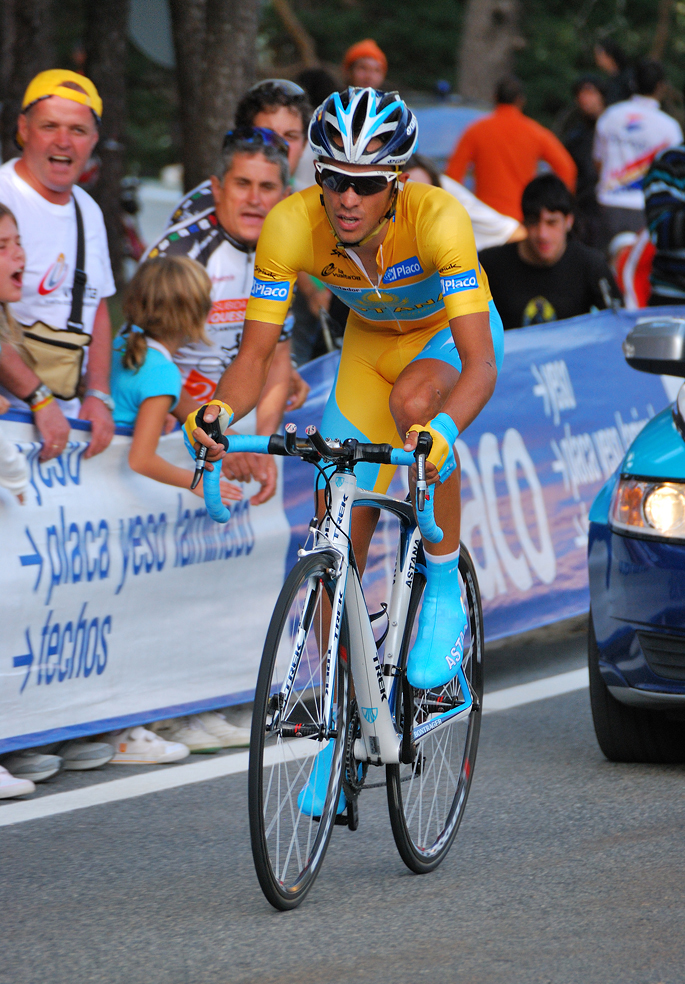
Contador wearing the golden jersey during the 20th stage of the Vuelta a España.

The next stage, after the first rest day, was the longest in the Vuelta and contained numerous mountain climbs. It was made even more difficult by a consistent downfall of rain and cold temperatures. Contador and Leipheimer both marked the competition and finished well on the stage, third and fifth respectively, to maintain their high overall placings. Leipheimer regained the race lead the next day essentially by default, as Alessandro Ballan, who had won the difficult Stage 7, quickly faded on Stage 8. Again Astana did not work to keep Leipheimer in the race lead, affording a breakaway that included Egoi Martínez sufficient time that Martínez took the golden jersey. The next day, several local newspapers criticized Astana for the move, as CSC–Saxo Bank and Caisse d'Epargne had tried to pull the peloton such that Astana would have no choice to defend the jersey, but were unable to force their hand. Martínez reacted to his assumption of the race lead as though it were a gift from his former manager Bruyneel.

Following several stages won by sprinters and breakaways, the next test for the riders was the legendary Alto de El Angliru in Stage 13. The morning breakaway was afforded over eleven minutes, but it was dropped to nothing on the ascent of what has been called the most difficult climb in all of professional cycling. Astana and Caisse d'Epargne both had many support riders in the leading group going up the climb, and they alternately tried to set paces to protect either Contador or Alejandro Valverde while isolating the competition. It was left to Leipheimer to pace Contador to the conclusion as the climb reached its hardest part, 7 kilometers from the finish. Contador indeed went on to win the stage, and took the race lead as well. Contador added another stage win the next day when only he and Leipheimer could respond to the repeated attacks of Ezequiel Mosquera, and Contador won the sprint.

The top ten in the general classification finished together in the next five stages, which were mostly friendly to sprinters and breakaways. Stage 20 was another time trial, one with an uphill finish. This time trial was won convincingly by Leipheimer, as only Contador and Valverde were within a minute of his winning time. This ride put Leipheimer 46 seconds off Contador's time. With the Vuelta's final stage flat and largely ceremonial, akin to the Champs-Élysées stage in the Tour de France, this stood as the final result, with Contador winning the Vuelta to complete his career triple; he also won the combination classification and its white jersey. Minor controversy followed the Vuelta; Contador alleged that Leipheimer was not being a team player by seeming to ride the Stage 20 time trial with the aim of winning the Vuelta, after Contador had apparently been decided as the team's leader, though the team had not firmly chosen a leader as the race began.

== Away from competition ==
=== Exclusion from ASO races ===
On February 13, it was announced that the Amaury Sport Organisation would not invite Astana to any of their races that season, which included the Tour de France, Paris–Nice, and numerous one-day races. The decision was made because of the doping perpetrated by Astana in its previous seasons; chief among these scandals was the blood doping perpetrated by Alexander Vinokourov in the 2007 Tour de France. The team reacted with surprise and disappointment, particularly since the ban seemed to punish a team that no longer existed, and as a result Contador would not be able to defend his Tour de France championship.

=== Dismissal of Vladimir Gusev ===
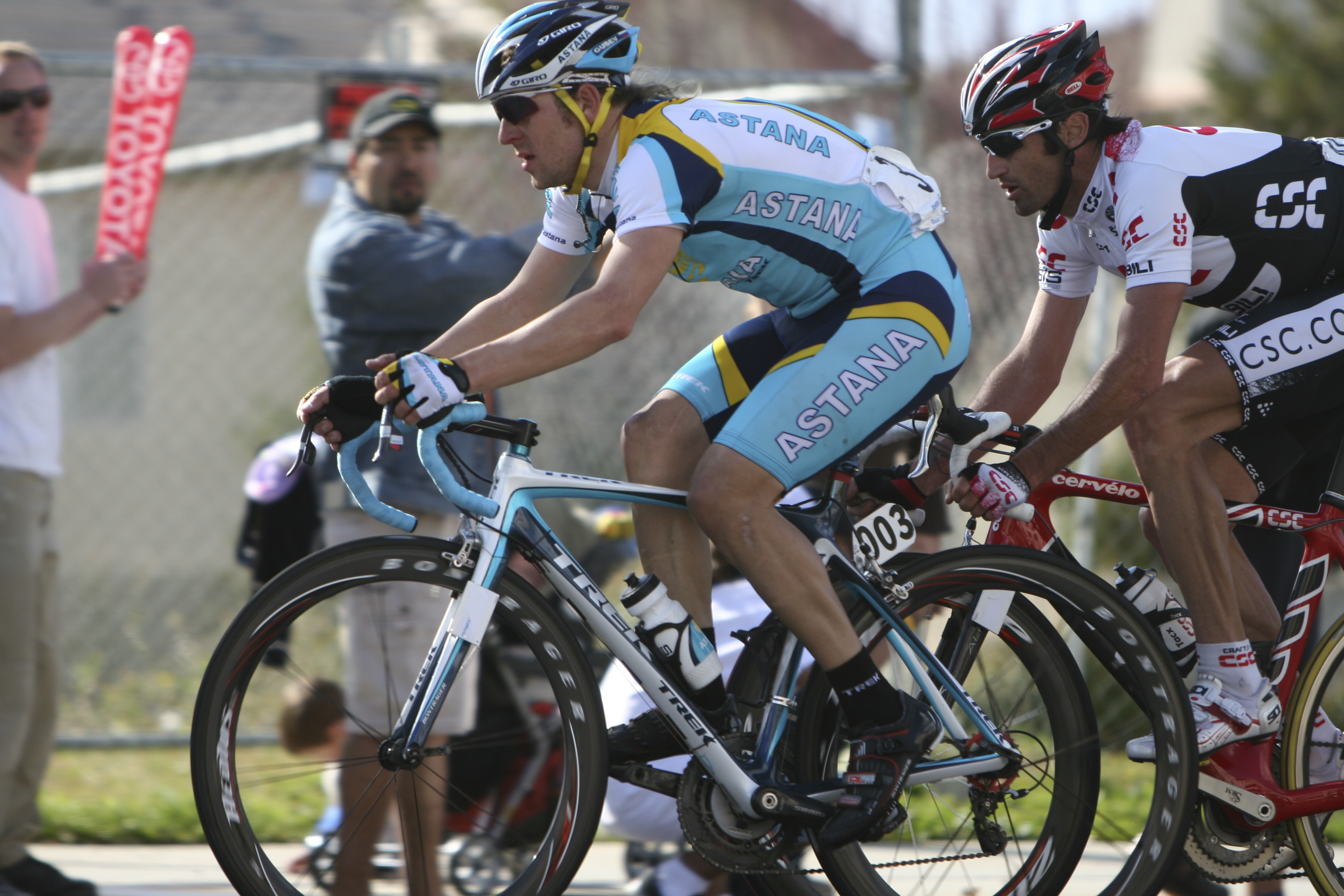
Gusev riding the third stage of the Tour of California, between Modesto and San José.

On June 26, the team fired Vladimir Gusev for "irregular values" given in an internal doping check as part of the program run by Dr. Rasmus Damsgaard, proprietor of a noted anti-doping system previously used by Team CSC. Though the values did not by themselves confirm doping on Gusev's part, they were taken as an indication of it.

The firing also caused Gusev to be removed from Russia's team for the 2008 Olympic Games, though he originally intended to sue the team in time to still take part in the Olympics.

On September 1, Gusev began his appeal of the firing, with the case eventually reaching the Court of Arbitration for Sport. On June 18, 2009, the CAS ruled that Astana was in the wrong regarding Gusev's dismissal and ordered the team to pay his lost wages, legal fees, and compensatory damages.

=== Return of Lance Armstrong ===
Seven-time Tour de France winner Lance Armstrong revealed in an interview with Vanity Fair magazine published on September 9 that he intended to return to competitive cycling in 2009, after four years of retirement. Aside from trying to win an eighth Tour de France, his goal would be to raise public awareness and money for cancer research. He would ride for no salary.

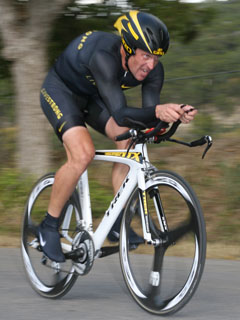
Armstrong training for his 2009 comeback at a time trial in New Braunfels, Texas on November 1.

It was speculated immediately that Armstrong would return with team Astana, as it was now headed by Armstrong's sporting director from each of his seven Tour de France victories, Johan Bruyneel.

Though spokespeople for the team first denied any plans to sign Armstrong, Bruyneel commented two days later during the then-ongoing Vuelta a España that he had spoken to Armstrong about his return, and could not imagine him riding for any team but Astana. On September 24, Armstrong signed with Astana.

Armstrong's return was not well received by Contador, who asserted that he had earned the right to be a team leader and said he would consider leaving the team if he were relegated to a role supporting Armstrong.

The team gave Contador assurances in the offseason that he would remain Astana's team leader, and Contador remained with the team for 2009, though the controversy over who would in fact be the team's leader lasted well into the 2009 Tour de France.

== Season victories ==
Date	Race	Competition	Rider	Country	Location
February 21	Volta ao Algarve, Stage 2	UCI Europe Tour	Tomas Vaitkus (LTU)	Portugal	Lagos
February 22	Tour of California, Stage 5	UCI America Tour	Levi Leipheimer (USA)	United States	Solvang
February 24	Tour of California, Overall	UCI America Tour	Levi Leipheimer (USA)	United States	
March 5	Vuelta a Murcia, Stage 2	UCI Europe Tour	José Luis Rubiera (ESP)	Spain	Totana
March 23	Ronde van het Groene Hart	UCI Europe Tour	Tomas Vaitkus (LTU)	Netherlands	Woerden
March 24	Vuelta a Castilla y León, Stage 1	UCI Europe Tour	Alberto Contador (ESP)	Spain	La Granja de San Ildefonso
March 27	Vuelta a Castilla y León, Stage 4	UCI Europe Tour	Alberto Contador (ESP)	Spain	Montaña Palentina
March 27	Vuelta a Castilla y León, Overall	UCI Europe Tour	Alberto Contador (ESP)	Spain	
April 7	Vuelta al País Vasco, Stage 1	UCI ProTour	Alberto Contador (ESP)	Spain	Legazpi
April 12	Vuelta al País Vasco, Stage 6	UCI ProTour	Alberto Contador (ESP)	Spain	Orio
April 12	Vuelta al País Vasco, Overall	UCI ProTour	Alberto Contador (ESP)	Spain	
April 13	Presidential Cycling Tour of Turkey, Prologue	UCI Europe Tour	Grégory Rast (SUI)	Turkey	Istanbul
April 20	Presidential Cycling Tour of Turkey, Points Classification	UCI Europe Tour	Assan Bazayev (KAZ)	Turkey	
April 30	Tour de Romandie, Stage 1	UCI ProTour	Maxim Iglinsky (KAZ)	Switzerland	Saignelégier
May 2	Tour de Romandie, Stage 3	UCI ProTour	Andreas Klöden (GER)	Switzerland	Sion
May 5	Tour de Romandie, Overall	UCI ProTour	Andreas Klöden (GER)	Switzerland	
June 1	Giro d'Italia, Overall	None	Alberto Contador (ESP)	Italy	
June 8	Critérium du Dauphiné Libéré, Prologue	UCI ProTour	Levi Leipheimer (USA)	France	Avignon
June 22	Tour de Suisse, Mountains classification	UCI ProTour	Maxim Iglinsky (KAZ)	Switzerland	
July 11	Tour of Austria, Stage 5	UCI Europe Tour	René Haselbacher (AUT)	Austria	Bad Vöslau
July 11	Cascade Cycling Classic, Stage 3	National event	Levi Leipheimer (USA)	United States	Bend
July 13	Cascade Cycling Classic, Overall	National event	Levi Leipheimer (USA)	United States	
July 30	Tour de Wallonie, Overall	UCI Europe Tour	Sergeui Ivanov (RUS)	Belgium	
August 24	Clásica a los Puertos de Guadarrama	UCI Europe Tour	Levi Leipheimer (USA)	Spain	Guadarrama
September 3	Vuelta a España, Stage 5	None	Levi Leipheimer (USA)	Spain	Ciudad Real
September 13	Vuelta a España, Stage 13	None	Alberto Contador (ESP)	Spain	Alto de El Angliru
September 14	Vuelta a España, Stage 14	None	Alberto Contador (ESP)	Spain	Fuentes de Invierno
September 20	Vuelta a España, Stage 20	None	Levi Leipheimer (USA)	Spain	Alto de Navacerrada
September 21	Vuelta a España, Overall	None	Alberto Contador (ESP)	Spain	
September 21	Vuelta a España, Combination classification	None	Alberto Contador (ESP)	Spain	
