= 2007 Astana season =

Astana
- 2007 season
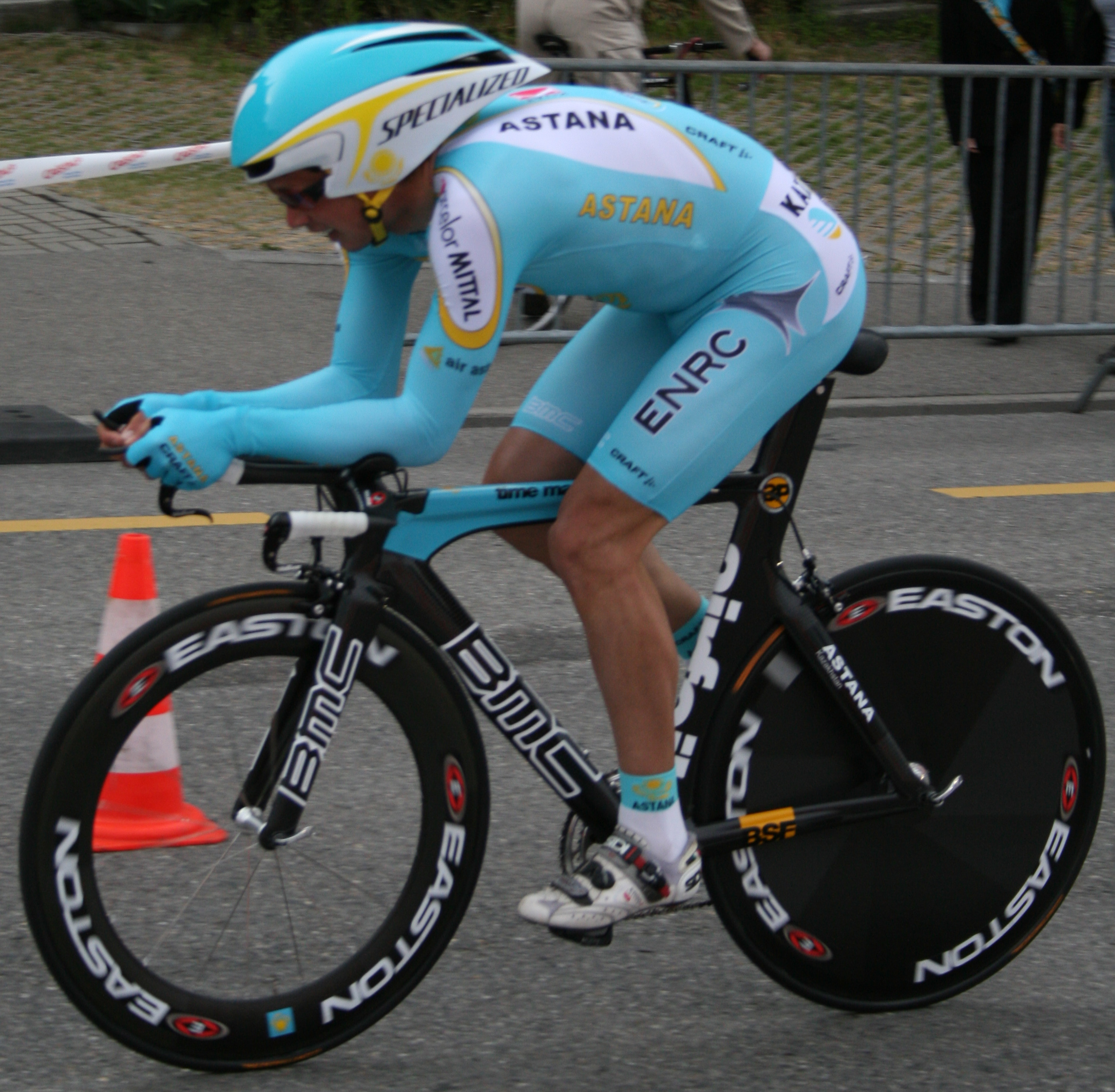
- Paolo Savoldelli at the 2007 Tour de Romandie
- UCI code: AST
- Manager: Marc Biver

Season victories
- One-day races: 4
- Stage race overall: 3
- Stage race stages: 12
- National Championships: 2

The 2007 season for the Astana cycling team was its first, though the team's sponsors in the Kazakhstani government had entered the sport the year before backing the dissolved Liberty Seguros team. That same team was known as "Astana" for part of the season, including the 2006 Vuelta a España, but as the UCI license previously held by Manolo Saiz transferred to new ownership, headquartered in a new nation, it is considered a new team from 2007 onward. The team's manager for the 2007 season was former Tour de Suisse organizer Marc Biver, who had never before managed a cycling team at any level.

The team's season began with the Tour of Qatar in late January and ended in November with Aaron Kemps' victory in the Noosa International Criterium. Astana participated in the 2007 UCI ProTour, but after withdrawing from the 2007 Tour de France due to doping perpetrated by Alexander Vinokourov, they participated in just one further ProTour event. Astana's 2007 season was largely marked by doping, as Vinokourov, Andrey Kashechkin, Matthias Kessler, and Eddy Mazzoleni all either tested positive for doping or were otherwise implicated in scandals and fired from the team. José Antonio Redondo was also fired during the 2007 season.

The repeated doping scandals caused the team's sponsors to eventually remove Biver as manager, replacing him in the offseason with Johan Bruyneel, whose Discovery Channel Pro Cycling Team dissolved after the 2007 season.

The team's biggest win in 2007 that was not tainted by a doping scandal was Andreas Klöden's overall victory in Tirreno–Adriatico. The team also claimed stage wins in the Giro d'Italia and the Critérium du Dauphiné Libéré, and won a stage and the overall title in the Tour de Luxembourg.

== 2007 team roster ==
Ages as of January 1, 2007

| Rider | Date of birth |
|---|---|
| Igor Abakoumov (BEL) | May 30, 1981 (aged 25) |
| Assan Bazayev (KAZ) | February 22, 1981 (aged 25) |
| Antonio Colóm (ESP) | May 11, 1978 (aged 28) |
| Koen de Kort (NED) | September 8, 1982 (aged 24) |
| Thomas Frei (SUI) | January 19, 1984 (aged 22) |
| Maxim Gourov (KAZ) | January 30, 1979 (aged 28) |
| René Haselbacher (AUT) | September 15, 1977 (aged 29) |
| Maxim Iglinskiy (KAZ) | April 18, 1981 (aged 25) |
| Sergei Ivanov (RUS) | March 5, 1975 (aged 31) |
| Benoît Joachim (LUX) | January 4, 1976 (aged 30) |
| Andrey Kashechkin (KAZ) | March 21, 1980 (aged 26) |
| Matthias Kessler (GER) | May 16, 1979 (aged 27) |
| Andreas Klöden (GER) | June 22, 1975 (aged 31) |
| Alexey Kolessov (KAZ) | September 22, 1984 (aged 22) |

| Rider | Date of birth |
|---|---|
| Julien Mazet (FRA) | March 19, 1981 (aged 25) |
| Eddy Mazzoleni (ITA) | July 29, 1973 (aged 33) |
| Gennady Mikhaylov (RUS) | February 8, 1974 (aged 32) |
| Andrey Mizurov (KAZ) | March 16, 1973 (aged 33) |
| Steve Morabito (SUI) | January 30, 1983 (aged 23) |
| Dmitriy Muravyev (KAZ) | February 11, 1979 (aged 27) |
| Daniel Navarro (ESP) | July 8, 1983 (aged 23) |
| Grégory Rast (SUI) | January 17, 1980 (aged 26) |
| José Antonio Redondo (ESP) | March 5, 1985 (aged 21) |
| Paolo Savoldelli (ITA) | May 7, 1973 (aged 33) |
| Michael Schär (SUI) | September 29, 1986 (aged 20) |
| Evgeniy Sladkov (KAZ) | December 15, 1983 (aged 23) |
| Alexander Vinokourov (KAZ) | September 16, 1973 (aged 33) |
| Sergei Yakovlev (KAZ) | April 21, 1976 (aged 30) |

=== Riders' 2006 teams ===
Astana in this table refers to the prior Astana team, which began the 2006 season known as Liberty Seguros–Würth.

| Rider | 2006 team |
|---|---|
| Igor Abakoumov | Jartazi |
| Assan Bazayev | Astana |
| Antonio Colom | Caisse d'Epargne–Illes Balears |
| Koen de Kort | Astana |
| Thomas Frei | neo-pro |
| Maxim Gourov | none |
| René Haselbacher | Gerolsteiner |
| Maxim Iglinskiy | Team Milram |
| Sergei Ivanov | T-Mobile Team |
| Benoît Joachim | Discovery Channel |
| Andrey Kashechkin | Astana |
| Aaron Kemps | Astana |
| Matthias Kessler | T-Mobile Team |
| Andreas Klöden | T-Mobile Team |
| Alexey Kolessov | none |

| Rider | 2006 team |
|---|---|
| Julien Mazet | Auber 93 |
| Eddy Mazzoleni | T-Mobile Team |
| Gennady Mikhaylov | Discovery Channel |
| Andrey Mizurov | Capec |
| Steve Morabito | Phonak |
| Dimitry Muravyev | Jartazi |
| Daniel Navarro | Astana |
| Grégory Rast | Phonak |
| José Antonio Redondo | Astana |
| Daniel Navarro | Astana |
| Paolo Savoldelli | Discovery Channel |
| Michael Schär | neo-pro |
| Evgeniy Sladkov | neo-pro |
| Alexander Vinokourov | Astana |
| Sergei Yakovlev | Astana |

== Genesis of the new team ==
Astana has its roots in the former ONCE cycling team. ONCE, the Spanish national organization for deaf people, departed sponsorship in 2003 and was immediately replaced with Liberty Seguros, the Spanish subsidiary of a Boston-based insurance company. Liberty Seguros departed sponsorship in 2006, and sponsors in Kazakhstan stepped forward to back the team. It was briefly known as Astana-Würth until Würth, a German supplier of machine parts, also dropped sponsorship. For the last part of the 2006 season, the team competed under the name "Astana", including in the 2006 Vuelta a España, which was won by Astana rider Alexander Vinokourov.

Former Liberty Seguros team manager Manolo Saiz had contracts with Vinokourov and Andrey Kashechkin, as well as ownership of the UCI ProTour license the Kazakhstani sponsors wished to obtain. The sponsors originally signed with Saiz as well, but after Saiz's implication in the Operación Puerto doping case and the non-start of what was then known as the Astana-Würth team in the 2006 Tour de France, the Kazakhs nullified their contract with Saiz. On December 16, 2006, Saiz was informed that any team of hi would not be granted ProTour status for 2007 due to his involvement in the Operación Puerto. Though the UCI originally declined to grant the license to the Kazakhs on the grounds of uncertainty in their financial security, they were eventually given the final place in the 2007 UCI ProTour, though ProTour events were not obligated to invite them or Unibet.com as they were the other 18 ProTeams. Former Tour de Suisse organizer Marc Biver was named the general manager of the new team, largely because his agency IMG Switzerland was representing Vinokourov at the time. Biver had never managed a professional cycling team before. Many of the riders from 2006's Astana team joined the new team, though only Vinokourov and Kashechkin had been under contract beyond 2006 with the former Liberty Seguros team.

== One-day races ==
=== Spring classics ===
Before the races known as "classics" and the UCI ProTour began, Astana picked up a victory in the Trofeo Soller, part of the Vuelta a Mallorca quasi-stage race, as Antonio Colom won a sprint finish over countrymen breakaway companions Luis León Sánchez and Alberto Contador.

Astana was invited to every one-day race in the spring portion of the ProTour. The team was moderately successful, despite not winning any race – they finished in the top ten at the Tour of Flanders (Dmitriy Muravyev in 8th), the Amstel Gold Race (Matthias Kessler in 4th), La Flèche Wallonne (Kessler in 4th again, though his positive doping test at a control taken before the event casts doubt on the legitimacy of this result), and Liège–Bastogne–Liège (Kessler in 8th).

The team also participated in Omloop Het Volk, Kuurne–Brussels–Kuurne, and E3 Prijs Vlaanderen, but not finish higher than 11th in any of them.

=== Fall races ===
After Alexander Vinokourov's positive doping test at the Tour de France, the team did not enter many races, and were not invited to any of the fall one-day races in the ProTour. They obtained three wins at post-Tour criteriums, namely Andreas Klöden in City Nacht Rhede and Aaron Kemps in the Herald Sun Classic (run as the prologue to the Herald Sun Tour) and the Noosa International Criterium.

== Stage races ==
Astana's first event of the season was the Tour of Qatar. This event was dominated by Tom Boonen and team Quick-Step–Innergetic; Astana's best stage placing was René Haselbacher's 4th in Stage 6, and Michael Schär in 15th was the best-placed on the team in the final overall classification. The team then sent a squad to the Volta ao Algarve in February, with Haselbacher finishing on the podium, in second overall.

At Tirreno–Adriatico in March, Andreas Klöden won the race overall without winning an individual stage, largely because of his high placing and margin over previous race leader Stefan Schumacher in the high mountain stage 6. In April, Klöden claimed his second overall victory of the season at the Circuit de la Sarthe, winning a stage in this one, the time trial portion of the split Stage 2.

In May, the team found success at the Tour de Romandie. First, Paolo Savoldelli won the prologue individual time trial. Both he and Andrey Kashechkin subsequently finished on the podium, second and third respectively, after showing well in the final time trial, also finishing second and third respectively in that stage. Grégory Rast next won the Tour de Luxembourg in June thanks to time bonuses won by sprinting to victory in the final stage. In the Tour de Suisse two weeks later, Klöden earned a third place and a second place in the Tour's last two stages to earn a few UCI ProTour points. He finished the event tenth overall.

The team was greatly successful at the Critérium du Dauphiné Libéré, winning four stages, the points classification, having two different riders wear the yellow jerseym and finishing on the event's final podium. They took the top two positions in the Stage 3 individual time trial, with Vinokourov and Kashechkin. The win put Vinokourov in the race lead. Kashechkin took the race lead the next day after climbing Mont Ventoux five minutes faster than Vinokourov. Antonio Colom and Vinokourov formed a winning breakaway in the next stage, with Colom winning the sprint to the finish line, and Kashechkin retaining the race lead. Stage 6, the Dauphiné's queen stage, was another Astana victory in a breakaway, this time a solo effort from Maxim Iglinskiy. Kashechkin lost the overall lead in the race to eventual champion Christophe Moreau on this stage. The final individual time trial provided the cap to an extremely successful event for Astana, with Vinokourov winning to give them a fourth stage win, and Kashechkin holding on for third in the overall classification. His repeated high placings earned Vinokourov victory in the points classification.

After Vinokourov's positive doping test in the Tour de France, the team was disinvited from most of the remaining ProTour events on the schedule, specifically the Deutschland Tour, the Eneco Tour, and the Vuelta a España, participating only in the Tour de Pologne (they did not achieve a notable result in this race). One of the few events the team entered in the fall was the Herald Sun Tour, where they won four stages, two each by Aaron Kemps and Steve Morabito.

The team sent squads to Paris–Nice, Three Days of De Panne, and the Vuelta al País Vasco, but did not obtain a notable result in any of them.

== Grand Tours ==
=== Giro d'Italia ===
Astana was one of 22 teams to participate in the Giro d'Italia. Paolo Savoldelli was an outside favorite in the event, though he never actually threatened the overall lead, instead helping Eddy Mazzoleni in some late mountain stages. The team started fairly well, finishing 13 seconds behind Liquigas in the Stage 1 team time trial for second place, though they had only the minimum of five riders finishing together. Savoldelli and Mazzoleni were among the riders that were thus 13 seconds off the pace after Stage 1. Assan Bazayev got two high stage placings in the next week, firstly fourth in a sprint finish to Stage 2 and then third in Stage 8 from a breakaway. Sergei Yakovlev was also in this breakaway, and held third place in the overall classification for two days as a result.

After consecutive fifth-place showings in Stages 14 and 15, Mazzoleni rose to second overall, just under two minutes behind race leader and eventual Giro champion Danilo Di Luca. He stayed there until the short but very mountainous Stage 17, where he slipped to fifth overall after losing over two minutes. A very successful Stage 20 individual time trial saw Astana take first and second, with Savoldelli and Mazzoleni, respectively. Mazzoleni returned to a podium position after the stage, in third overall, and finished in that position as the race concluded the next day.

=== Tour de France ===
Astana was one of 21 teams invited to the Tour de France. Vinokourov and Klöden were the squad's co-captains, with Kashechkin their main lieutenant and prepared to be a protected rider should either or both of them falter. Vinokourov and Klöden showed well in the prologue time trial, with Klöden second and thus the wearer of the green jersey in Stage 1, with Vinokourov seventh. Klöden stayed out of trouble in Stages 1 through 6, which all featured sprint finishes, but Vinokourov first fell from the top ten due to time bonuses obtained by sprinters and then when he lost over a minute in Stage 5, crashing before the final climb. The high mountain Stages 7 and 8 saw Klöden fall as well, first as a breakaway in Stage 7 was afforded enough time to shake up the top ten and then as Vinokourov and Klöden were both over four minutes off the winning pace of Michael Rasmussen in Stage 8. This stage, however, saw the rise of Kashechkin to fifth overall. In the next stage, after the first rest day, Klöden rebounded with a 9th-place finish to return to the top ten, at seventh overall. Vinokourov was, at this point, 21st.

The next four stages all ended in group sprints. Stage 13 was an individual time trial. Vinokourov was originally the winner of this stage, by a margin of over a minute against second-place finisher Cadel Evans. It was thought at the time, and said by Vinokourov, to be his return to competitiveness in the overall classification, as it indeed lifted him to ninth at the time. Klöden and Kashechkin were originally third and fourth on the stage, putting all of them in the top ten overall and giving Astana the lead in the teams classification. In Stage 14, Vinokourov lost nearly 30 minutes and plummeted from 9th to 30th in the overall classification, while Klöden, Kashechkin, and Antonio Colom all finished in the top ten, keeping Klöden and Kashechkin in the top ten overall. Stage 15 the next day was one of the Tour's marquee stages, with five high mountain climbs. Vinokourov originally won this stage after escaping from a 25-man breakaway and soloing to the finish line. After this stage, Klöden was fifth overall and Kashechkin eighth, and the team was in the lead of the teams classification. It would prove to be the last stage of the Tour for Astana, as news surfaced on the second rest day, after Stage 15, that Vinokourov had tested positive for blood doping. The team was subsequently "invited to withdraw," and did, leaving en masse before Stage 16. On April 30, 2008, Vinokourov was formally stripped of his two-stage wins.

== Doping scandals ==
Astana's 2007 season was largely marked by doping scandals. At a doping control before La Flèche Wallonne, Matthias Kessler's sample had abnormally high testosterone. When this was confirmed by his B-sample, on July 13, the team fired him. Shortly thereafter, Eddy Mazzoleni quit the team pending a hearing probing his involvement in the Oil for Drugs case, while leaving open the possibility of returning with another team. Later that same day, though, he retired altogether from the sport, and was subsequently banned for two years in April 2008.

Vinokourov's positive blood doping test at the Tour de France was the team's most noticeable doping scandal of the season, such that it was referred to as a "disgrace." After his B-sample also tested positive, the team fired him, on July 30. After Vinokourov's positive at the Tour, the team went into a self-imposed suspension and did not participate in any races for some six weeks. During this time, Andrey Kashechkin tested positive for blood doping at an unannounced control in Turkey on August 1. On August 20, after his B-sample also tested positive, Kashechkin was dismissed from the team. The team planned to return at the Vuelta a España, but was disinvited from that event because of their repeated problems with doping. The team also fired José Antonio Redondo, shortly after their hiatus ended, though this was not due to doping.

The repeated doping scandals prompted the UCI to summon Biver to explain his team's behavior, with a potential global suspension hanging over them.

== Offseason changes ==
After the season, Biver was dismissed as the team's general manager. He was replaced by Johan Bruyneel of the Discovery Channel Pro Cycling Team, which, though coming off an extremely successful Tour de France, failed to find a sponsor for 2008 and folded. Bruyneel was the main target of the Kazakh Cycling Federation to lead the team starting in the 2008 season. At the same time as the Bruyneel hire, the KCF also announced that the team would follow the anti-doping system of Dr. Rasmus Damsgaard, the same system used by Team CSC in 2007. This was after Biver had refused to conduct an internal doping probe before the Tour de France. Eight riders from the Discovery Channel team also joined Astana for 2008, including Tour de France champion Alberto Contador.
