= 2009 Astana season =

2009 season for the Astana cycling team

Astana
- 2009 season
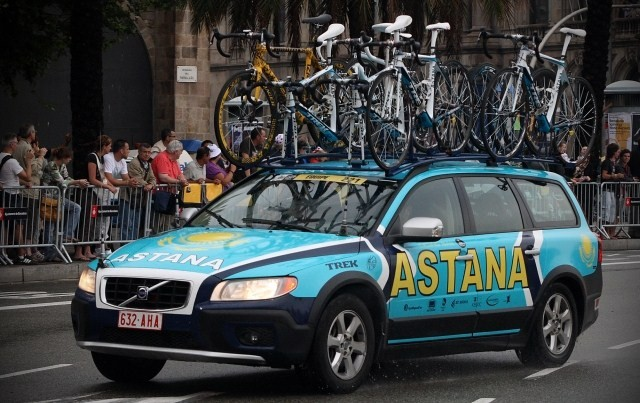
- The Astana Volvo team car in 2009.
- UCI code: AST
- Status: UCI ProTour team
- World Ranking: 1st (1100 points)
- Manager: Johan Bruyneel
- Main sponsor(s): Samruk-Kazyna
- Based: Kazakhstan
- Bicycles: Trek
- Groupset: SRAM

Season victories
- One-day races: none
- Stage race overall: 5
- Stage race stages: 13
- Grand Tours: 1
- National Championships: 2
- Most wins: Alberto Contador (10 wins)
- Best ranked rider: Alberto Contador (1st)

The 2009 season for the Astana cycling team began in January with the Tour Down Under and ended in October with the Giro di Lombardia. As a UCI ProTour team, they were automatically invited to and obliged to attend every UCI ProTour event, and were invited to every event in the inaugural UCI World Calendar as well.

With a strong identity as a stage racing team, Astana's leaders in 2009 were Alberto Contador, Levi Leipheimer, and Lance Armstrong, who returned to competitive cycling in 2009 after a four-year absence. The team's manager up through the Tour de France was Johan Bruyneel.

The team's biggest success in 2009 was Contador's overall victory in the Tour de France. Elsewhere, their main successes in 2009 were in small stage races, with Contador winning the Volta ao Algarve and the Vuelta al País Vasco as well as two stages in Paris–Nice, and Leipheimer winning the Tour of California and the Vuelta a Castilla y León. The team also won the team classification at numerous events. The team failed to live up to lofty expectations in the Giro d'Italia; Leipheimer was widely considered a favorite for victory, as was Armstrong before a collarbone injury sustained weeks before, but Leipheimer finished sixth overall and the team did not win any stage.

Away from competition, the team's season was marked by financial troubles with their sponsors in the Kazakhstani government, which threatened the team's makeup and very existence for a time. The return of Alexander Vinokourov from retirement and a ban for doping, which ended just as the 2009 Tour de France did, changed the team's makeup for 2010.

== 2009 team roster ==
Ages as of January 1, 2009

Rider	Date of birth
Lance Armstrong (USA)	September 18, 1971 (aged 37)
Assan Bazayev (KAZ)	February 22, 1981 (aged 27)
Janez Brajkovič (SLO)	December 18, 1983 (aged 25)
Alberto Contador (ESP)	December 6, 1982 (aged 26)
Valeriy Dmitriyev (KAZ)	October 10, 1984 (aged 24)
Alexsandr Dyachenko (KAZ)	October 17, 1983 (aged 25)
Jesús Hernández (ESP)	September 28, 1981 (aged 27)
Chris Horner (USA)	October 23, 1971 (aged 37)
Maxim Iglinskiy (KAZ)	April 18, 1981 (aged 27)
Roman Kireyev (KAZ)	February 14, 1987 (aged 21)
Andreas Klöden (GER)	June 22, 1975 (aged 33)
Berik Kupeshov (KAZ)	January 30, 1987 (aged 21)
Levi Leipheimer (USA)	October 24, 1973 (aged 35)
Steve Morabito (SUI)	January 30, 1983 (aged 25)

Rider	Date of birth
Dmitriy Muravyev (KAZ)	February 11, 1979 (aged 29)
Daniel Navarro (ESP)	July 8, 1983 (aged 25)
Benjamín Noval (ESP)	January 23, 1979 (aged 29)
Sérgio Paulinho (POR)	March 26, 1980 (aged 28)
Yaroslav Popovych (UKR)	January 4, 1980 (aged 28)
Bolat Raimbekov (KAZ)	December 25, 1986 (aged 22)
Grégory Rast (SUI)	January 17, 1980 (aged 28)
Sergey Renev (KAZ)	January 3, 1985 (aged 23)
José Luis Rubiera (ESP)	January 27, 1973 (aged 35)
Michael Schär (SUI)	September 29, 1986 (aged 22)
Tomas Vaitkus (LTU)	February 4, 1982 (aged 26)
Alexander Vinokourov (Note: Vinokourov joined the team on August 29, at the beginning of the Vuelta a España) (KAZ)	September 16, 1973 (aged 35)
Andrey Zeits (KAZ)	December 14, 1986 (aged 22)
Haimar Zubeldia (ESP)	April 1, 1977 (aged 31)

Riders who joined the team for the 2009 season

Rider	2008 team
Lance Armstrong	ex-pro (Discovery Channel, 2005)
Valeriy Dmitriyev	Ulan
Alexsandr Dyachenko	Ulan
Jesús Hernández	Relax–GAM
Yaroslav Popovych	Silence–Lotto
Bolat Raimbekov	Ulan
Sergey Renev	Ulan
Haimar Zubeldia	Euskaltel–Euskadi

Riders who left the team during or after the 2008 season

Rider	2009 team
Antonio Colom	Team Katusha
Koen de Kort	Skil–Shimano
Thomas Frei	BMC Racing Team
Vladimir Gusev	No contract (signed with Team Katusha in 2010)
René Haselbacher	Vorarlberg–Corratec
Sergeui Ivanov	Team Katusha
Benoît Joachim	Continental Team Differdange
Aaron Kemps	Rock Racing
Julien Mazet	Auber 93

== One-day races ==
=== Spring classics ===
By their own admission, Astana did not aim for the classics. Astana's first one-day race of the season was Omloop Het Nieuwsblad. Their best-placed rider was Michael Schär in 35th. Aside from their one podium finish, with Maxim Iglinsky in E3 Prijs Vlaanderen, the seventh place attained by Daniel Navarro in the Gran Premio di Lugano was the team's best result in a one-day race in the spring season. Through Kuurne–Brussels–Kuurne, Milan–San Remo (which saw the participation of Armstrong), the Tour of Flanders, Gent–Wevelgem, Paris–Roubaix, the Amstel Gold Race, La Flèche Wallonne, and Liège–Bastogne–Liège they did not have a rider finish higher than 16th (Assan Bazayev in Milan – San Remo)

=== Fall races ===
Astana raced a light schedule in the fall, with the pinnacle of their season having come at the Tour de France. The team sent squads to the Clásica de San Sebastián, Vattenfall Cyclassics, the GP Ouest-France, the Giro dell'Emilia, the GP Beghelli, the Giro del Piemonte, and the Giro di Lombardia. Their best results from this crop of races came from Alexander Vinokourov, who finished seventh in Lombardy and fifth in the Giro dell'Emilia.

== Stage races ==
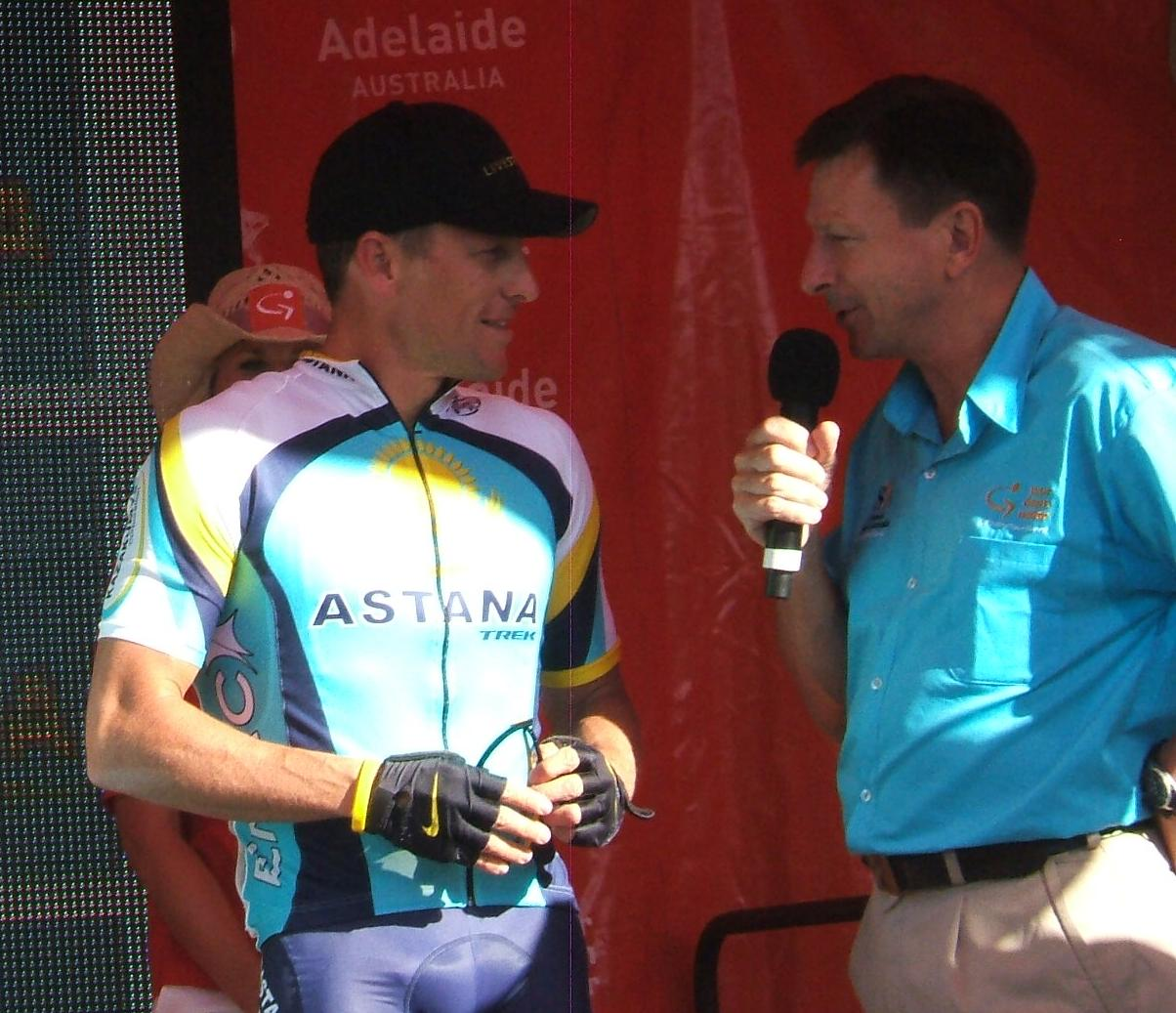
Armstrong being interviewed by Paul Sherwen before his first race back from retirement, the Tour Down Under.

The first event in which the team participated in 2009 was the Tour Down Under. As it was Armstrong's first event back after four years of retirement, he made many headlines and was even specially promoted on the event's webpage, though neither he nor the team were especially competitive in the event. Armstrong finished 29th overall, with the same time as Jesús Hernández in 28th as the best-placed Astana riders. The team did not finish in the top ten in any stage. In February, the team competed in the Tour of California, where Leipheimer won the individual time trial in Solvang and the Tour itself for the third straight year. The team also won the teams classification. While the Tour of California was ongoing, the team sent another eight-man squad including Contador and Andreas Klöden to the Volta ao Algarve. Contador and Klöden were first and third, respectively, in the time trial in Stage 4, giving Contador the overall lead which he retained through the conclusion of the race the next day.

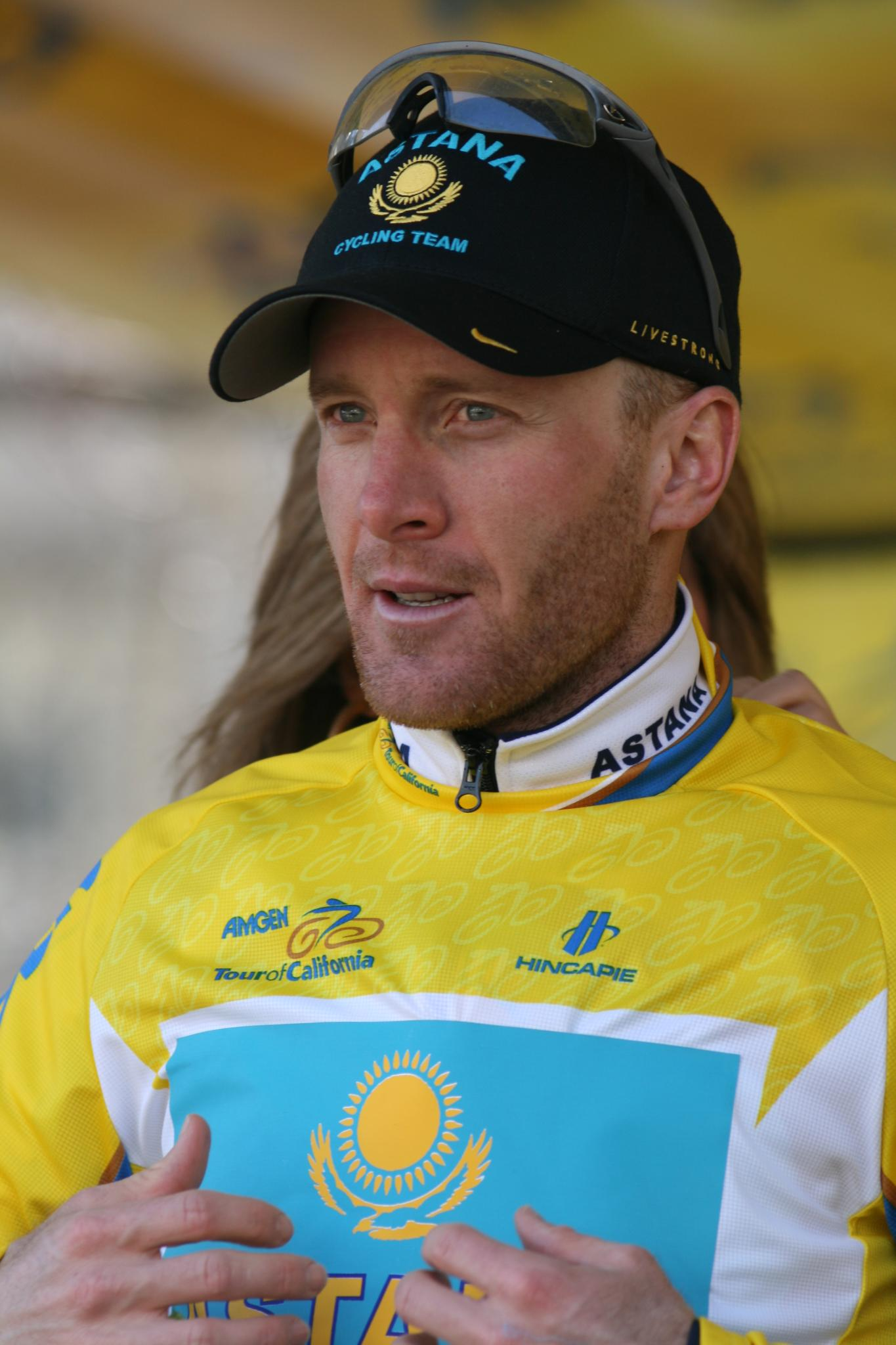
Leipheimer dons the yellow jersey after stage 2 of the Tour of California.

At Paris–Nice in March, Contador appeared well in line to repeat his victory there from two years prior, winning the opening individual time trial and the mountainous sixth stage. He dramatically faltered in Stage 7, however, losing the yellow jersey and three minutes to Luis León Sánchez, and ultimately finishing fourth. He was unable to chase down Sánchez because of what was later blamed on dietary problems. The team experienced both success and hardship in the Vuelta a Castilla y León later in the month. Leipheimer won the event overall, with Contador having ridden the event in support for him. The first day, however, Armstrong was involved in a crash and taken to the hospital with was later revealed as a fractured clavicle. The injury was thought to take away from Armstrong's previously high odds to win the Giro d'Italia, and there was briefly speculation that he would even pull out of the Giro because of the injury.

In April, Contador claimed a convincing victory in the Vuelta al País Vasco, taking the race lead by winning the mountainous Stage 3 and dominating the final time trial. Though they did not race as Astana due to UCI rules, Armstrong, Leipheimer, and Chris Horner took part in the Tour of the Gila at the end of April and early May in what was Armstrong's first race back from the collarbone injury, with Leipheimer and Armstrong finishing in the top two places. With a squad made up of riders that normally ride in support for others, the team took a stage win (Klöden) and second overall (Janez Brajkovič) in the Giro del Trentino, also in April.

Astana participated in the Volta a Catalunya in May, while the Giro d'Italia was ongoing. The team did not win any stage, but Haimar Zubeldia took third overall in the event, and the team won the teams classification. In the Critérium du Dauphiné Libéré in June, Contador was thought to be a favorite for victory, but he did not seem to try his hardest to win, not attacking or taking any pulls on the mountainous Stage 5 and seeming to work for Alejandro Valverde on the race's last two days. The team next took part in the Tour de Suisse, with Klöden in fourth their highest-placed rider.

Astana sent squads to the Brixia Tour, the Tour de Pologne, the Tour of Ireland, the Eneco Tour, the Tour of Missouri, and Franco–Belge, but did not obtain a stage win, podium finish, or classification victory in any of them. The squad sent to the Tour de l'Ain was more successful. Chris Horner obtained the race lead after the individual time trial in stage 3B, which was won by Alexander Vinokourov riding for the Kazakh national team. Though Horner fell to second behind Tour de l'Ain champion Rein Taaramäe the next day as the race concluded, he did win the points classification.

== Grand Tours ==
=== Giro d'Italia ===
Astana was one of 22 teams which participated in the Giro d'Italia. Contador chose to skip the Giro, despite his status as reigning champion, in order to concentrate on the Tour de France. The squad Astana sent to the Giro included Armstrong, in his first Grand Tour since the 2005 Tour de France and first ever Giro, and Leipheimer, who was considered to be a favorite to win the event. Support riders on the squad included Yaroslav Popovych, Chris Horner, and Janez Brajkovič.

The team started well, coming in third place in the team time trial in Stage 1, putting Leipheimer and Armstrong 13 seconds off the race lead. In the first mountain stage three days later, Leipheimer finished with Popovych and Horner with the same time as stage winner Danilo Di Luca, while Armstrong lost 15 seconds. The next day, Armstrong lost nearly three minutes and effectively lost any chance in the General Classification, while Leipheimer remained within ten seconds of stage winner Denis Menchov. Leipheimer was fourth overall after that stage and remained there until Stage 12, the very long and irregular individual time trial in Cinque Terre, where he was the only rider within a minute of the winning time put up by Menchov and moved to third overall. Horner withdrew from the race after Stage 10, after sustaining a leg injury that for a time prevented him from even being able to stand.

Leipheimer would fall from a podium position days later, though. After stages won by sprinters and breakaways, Stage 16, with a summit finish at Monte Petrano, was the next real test for riders aiming for the General Classification. Leipheimer was dropped by other leading riders on the climb and wound up losing almost three minutes on the stage, to fall to sixth overall. With their GC hopes all but dashed, Astana decided to try for stage wins on the remaining mountain days in the Giro. Armstrong attacked on Stage 17 and got clear of the leading group, but was unable to bridge to the man in first position on the road, Franco Pellizotti, who went on to win the stage. Ultimately, Astana did not win any stage at the Giro, but they did win the Trofeo Fast Team, beating Team Columbia–High Road by over 24 minutes.

=== Tour de France ===
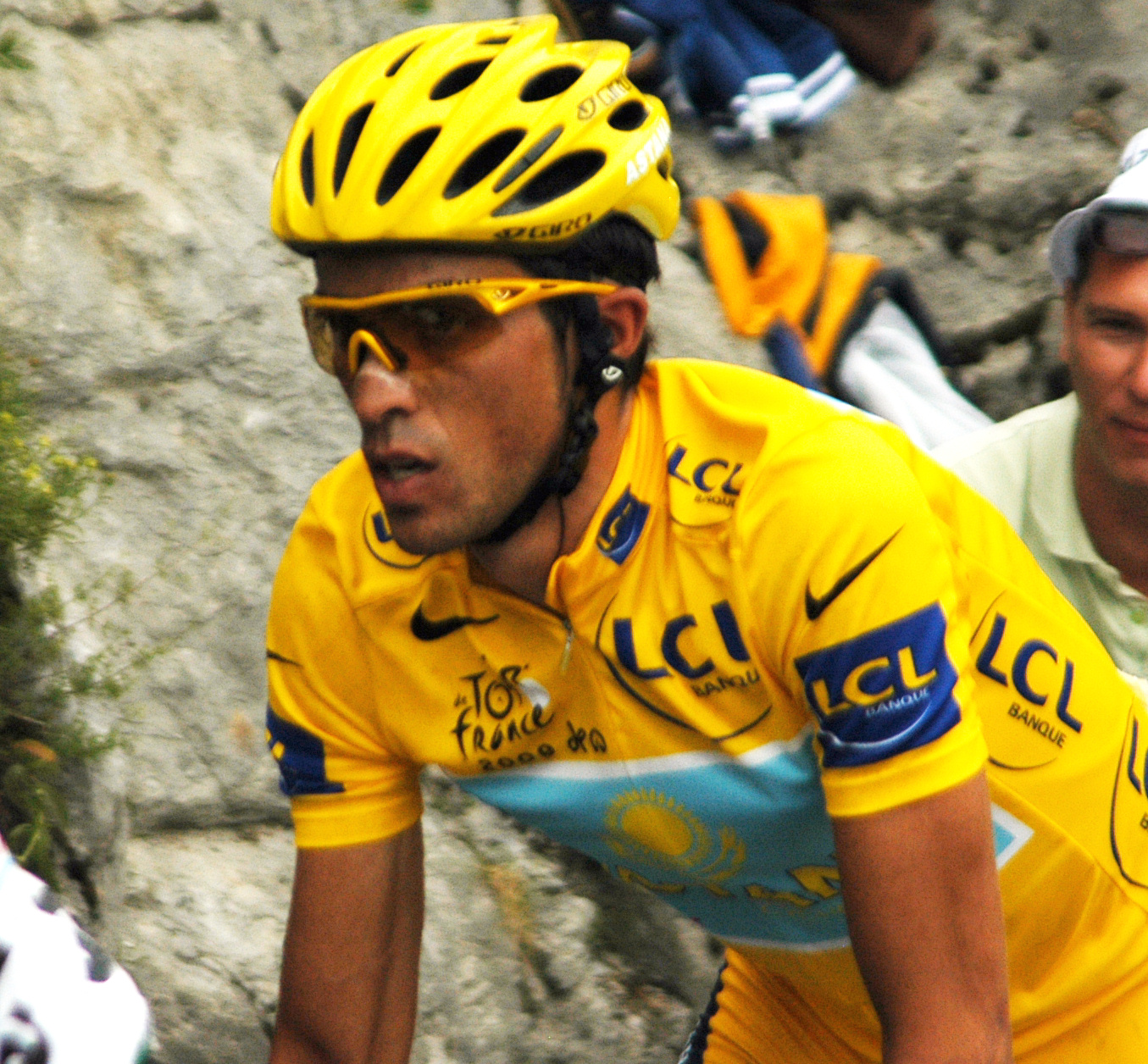
2009 Tour de France champion Contador

The team was one of 20 to receive an invitation to the Tour de France. Contador, Leipheimer, and Armstrong were all named to the team. There was much speculation and controversy, which began when Armstrong first signed with the team, over who would be the team's protected rider in the Tour. Though Armstrong's express goal in returning from retirement was to win an eighth Tour de France, Contador had won his last three Grand Tours and insisted that he deserved leadership of the team and hinted that he might leave if forced to support Armstrong. Bruyneel assured Contador that he would be the leader before the season began. Contador was also publicly named team leader shortly before the Tour began.

The team showed well in the Stage 1 individual time trial, with Contador, Klöden, Leipheimer, and Armstrong all finishing in the top ten, and Contador just 19 seconds off the time put up by stage winner Fabian Cancellara. Two days later, a surprising move made by Team Columbia–HTC resulted in the field being split, as eight members of that team pushed a 28-man breakaway toward the finish line ahead of the main peloton. Armstrong, Popovych, and Zubeldia were in the first group, as Popovych and Zubeldia had helped to drive the break, while Leipheimer, Contador, and the other members of the team were in the second group 41 seconds back. This resulted in Armstrong rising to third overall and displacing Contador as the team's best-placed rider. Speculation ensued that this move was meant to firmly install Armstrong as the team's leader, and Contador was visibly stunned by the stage result when interviewed afterward.

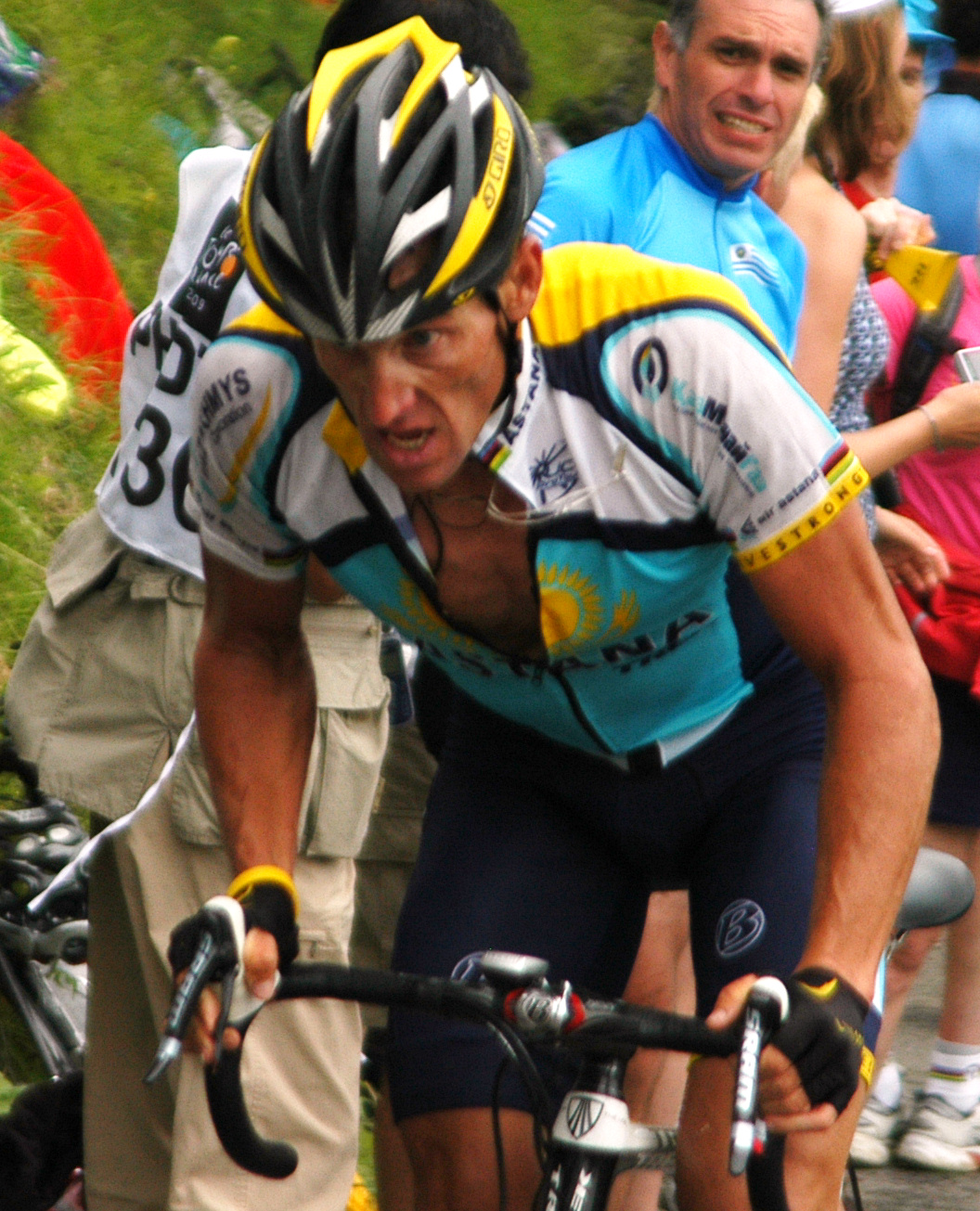
Armstrong climbing the Col de la Colombière during stage 17.

Astana won the Stage 4 team time trial the next day, putting Armstrong a mere 22/100ths of a second off the race lead and Contador, Klöden, and Leipheimer behind him third through fifth, with Zubeldia also in the top ten at seventh. After a couple of sprinter-friendly stages where the main contenders stuck together out of trouble, the high mountain Stage 7 shook the standings, and Astana, again. Coming to the finish line, a group of overall contenders was in ninth position on the road, as remnants of the morning's breakaway were scattered ahead of them. Instead of finishing as a cohesive group, Contador attacked from this group and gained 21 seconds, putting him ahead of Armstrong as Astana's best-placed rider again, though both were within 8 seconds of new race leader Rinaldo Nocentini. Armstrong said of Contador's attack that it "wasn't really the plan", but that he was nonetheless unsurprised by it. The team was dealt a major blow in Stage 12, when Leipheimer, after crashing with Cadel Evans in the final kilometers of the stage, was forced to leave the Tour with a broken wrist.

Stage 15 proved to be a crucial one, as the Tour entered Switzerland in a stage with many high mountain climbs. With about three kilometers gone by in an 8.8 km final climb to Verbier, Contador attacked and got free of the leading group, that included Klöden and Armstrong, soloing to the line for the stage win and the yellow jersey. Armstrong said after the stage that he had given it everything he had in the climb and Contador was simply the stronger rider; it was seen as settling any lingering controversy over the squad's leader and protected rider. Contador all but cemented the Tour title by winning the time trial in Annecy in Stage 18, just beating out Cancellara to post the day's best time. Armstrong gained a little over a minute on Fränk Schleck by finishing 16th, and climbed back into a podium position, third, with the result. The two finished the Tour in those positions after holding them on Mont Ventoux, and then riding home safely in the Tour's largely ceremonial finale in Stage 21.

=== Vuelta a España ===
The team was one of 22 to receive an invite to the Vuelta a España. After having first been named only as a reserve, the returning Alexander Vinokourov was named to the squad five days before the race began.

Astana's Vuelta was a quiet one. Vinokourov placed in the top ten of the opening individual time trial but he fell out of the top ten of the overall standings the next day due to a crash. Haimar Zubeldia's 18th-place finish on stage 8, which was the Vuelta's first high mountain stage, propelled him into eighth overall until the next day, when he lost time and fell to ninth. In stage 10, Vinokourov figured in a winning breakaway, but his poor positioning in the four-man sprint finish meant the stage victory went to Cervélo TestTeam's Simon Gerrans. Before stage 12, Astana held ninth overall. They continued to hold it after the stage, but the rider in that position changed; Zubeldia had been in the top ten, but finished further behind stage winner Ryder Hesjedal than Daniel Navarro, so it was Navarro who was the team's highest-placed rider after the stage. After the next two stages, Navarro also fell from the top ten, and the team did not achieve anything further, with Navarro in 13th their highest-placed rider in the race's final standings.

== Away from competition ==
=== Financial troubles ===
Shortly before the beginning of the Giro d'Italia, it was reported that many of the team's sponsors in Kazakhstan had not paid their full obligations to the team, and that most of the riders had been underpaid to that point in the season as a result. One sponsor, the Kazakhstani state carrier Air Astana, dropped its sponsorship entirely. There was concern that the team itself may fold, as UCI ProTour teams must meet certain financial parameters to stay active, or risk losing their UCI license.

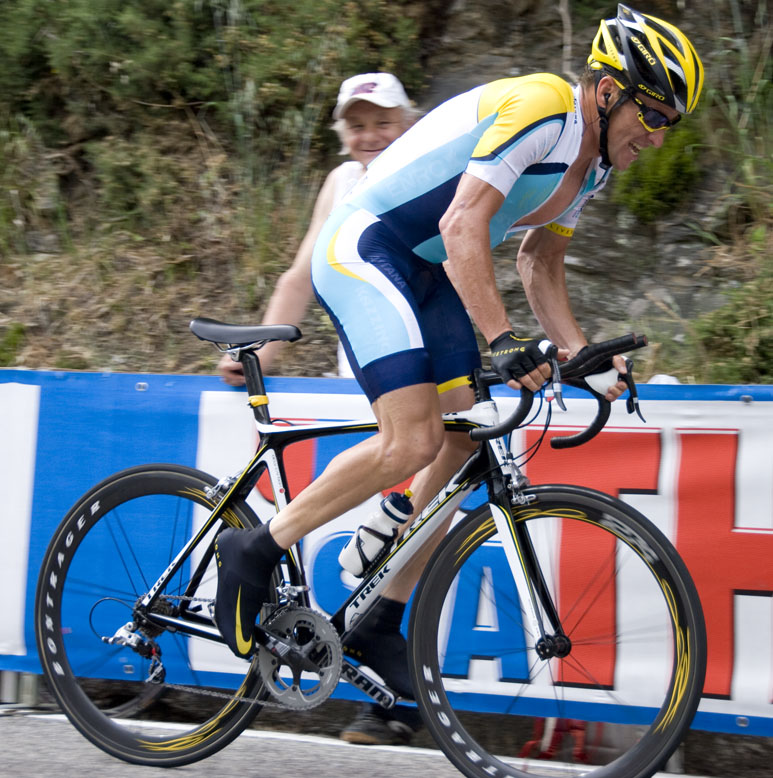
Armstrong during the first individual time trial of the Giro d'Italia, sporting the "faded" team jersey.

In protest to the underpayment by the team's sponsors, the team decided to change their jersey a week into the Giro. The new jersey was revealed on May 15, the date of Stage 7 when the Giro returned to Italy from Austria, as having the names of the underpaying sponsors faded out to the point of being unreadable. Of the nine Astana riders in the Giro, eight wore the new jerseys – Andrey Zeits, who is from Kazakhstan, was the only one to stay with the original jersey. The squad at the concurrent Volta a Catalunya did not wear the faded jerseys.

It was announced on June 19 that the situation had been resolved, with the Kazakh Cycling Federation agreeing to pay what the sponsors were indebted to the team. The team reverted to its normal jerseys in the Tour de France, with nothing faded out.

Shortly after this announcement, rumors circulated that Garmin–Slipstream had been close to signing Contador away from the team, should the Kazakhstani government have failed to pay its obligations and the team defaulted to the ownership of Armstrong or Bruyneel. Other unspecified Spanish Astana riders were also said to be close to jumping to the American team to follow Contador. Garmin team manager Jonathan Vaughters refused to address the rumors, saying that all negotiations are confidential until finalized, but Contador himself commented in September that he had been close to switching before the 2009 Tour began.

=== Return of Alexander Vinokourov and departure of Johan Bruyneel ===
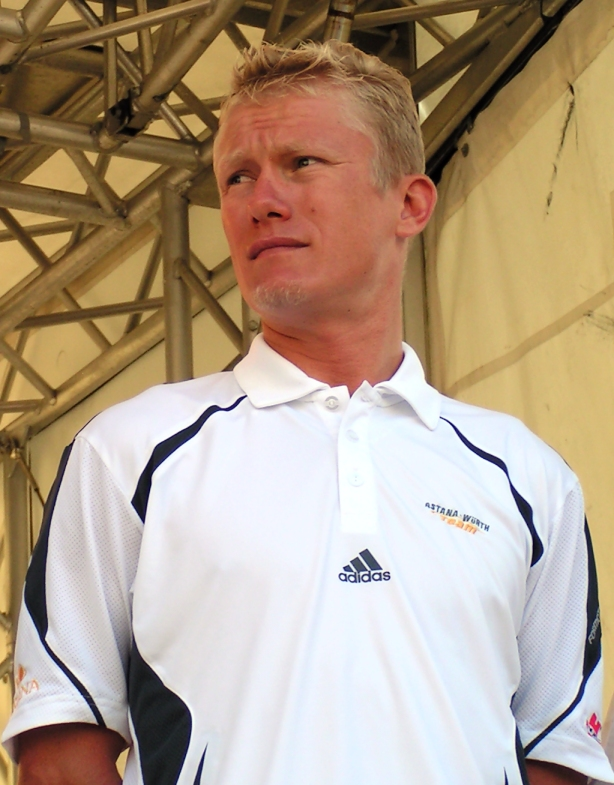
Alexander Vinokourov, pictured here in 2006, returned to professional cycling and to team Astana in 2009 after serving a suspension for doping.

While riding for Astana in the 2007 Tour de France, Alexander Vinokourov tested positive for blood doping, causing the entire team to be removed from the race and Vinokourov to retire after being banned from the sport by his national federation and the UCI. After confirming in October 2008 his intention to return to competitive cycling, Vinokourov stated on the eve of the 2009 Tour de France that he would rejoin Astana, the team he believes was created expressly for him, at the expiration of his two-year ban on July 24. He indicated that Astana manager Johan Bruyneel will be bound by the team's sponsors to accept him, or else Bruyneel would be forced from the team. Bruyneel publicly stated in April 2008 that he did not want Vinokourov on a team he ran.

The next day, it was further revealed that not only Bruyneel stood to be forced from the team according to Vinokourov, but also Armstrong and other riders from the former Discovery Channel Pro Cycling Team. The team would be built around Vinokourov and Contador, who would be able to choose which riders he wanted his teammates. It would contain almost exclusively Kazakhstani and Spanish riders, in the image of the former Liberty Seguros team, for which Contador previously rode. The matter was even addressed by the President of Kazakhstan Nursultan Nazarbayev. The new team organization would be in place by the Vuelta a España, which Vinokourov would ride.

On 21 July, with Contador, Armstrong and Klöden holding three of the top four places in the Tour de France, Bruyneel told Belgian channel VRT that Astana as currently constituted was "finished" and that he would be leaving the team, as Vinokourov and the Kazakh federation had discussed, after the season.

==== Disposition of riders for 2010 ====
In the wake of Bruyneel's announcement about leaving Astana during the Tour, Contador said that he would not consider his future until after the race was over. On 23 July, Lance Armstrong announced the formation of a new U.S. cycling team, Team RadioShack, for 2010. Whether Bruyneel would take part in this venture was not addressed at the time, but Armstrong then announced Bruyneel's participation on 25 August.

On 31 July, Contador's agent announced that Contador had turned down an offer to remain with Astana under a new four-year contract because he had felt uncomfortable being caught between the Kazakhs on one side and Bruyneel on the other, and he was hoping to leave Astana before his contract expired in 2010. However, on 11 August, Contador's close friend Sergio Paulinho accepted a two-year contract with Team RadioShack, indicating that Contador might not be able to leave Astana as he and his agent wished. This was confirmed on 15 August, when a spokesperson for the Kazakh sponsors of Astana said that they intended to sponsor the Astana team on the UCI ProTour through 2013 and that they intended to enforce the last year of Contador's contract with Astana in 2010.

Once Bruyneel's move to Team RadioShack was confirmed, the squad began filling with transfers from the 2009 Astana team. In addition to Armstrong and Paulinho, Tomas Vaitkus and Grégory Rast joined Team RadioShack as one-day classics specialists, and Jose Luis "Chechu" Rubiera joined for Grand Tour support. On September 1, Levi Leipheimer's move to Team RadioShack was confirmed and on October 2, Andreas Klöden's move was confirmed. On October 4, Chris Horner also signed with Team RadioShack for two years. On October 15, Yaroslav Popovich's move was also confirmed. It was also reported that Haimar Zubeldia was to remain with Astana, on order from Contandor, though for unclear reasons this changed, as Zubeldia's transfer to Team RadioShack was confirmed weeks later. With Dimitry Muravyev's transfer, Astana's entire 2009 Tour de France squad, Contador aside, had moved to Armstrong's new team.

Two other Astana riders moved with former Discovery Channel rider George Hincapie to team BMC for 2010: Steve Morabito and Michael Schär.

== Season victories ==
Date	Race	Competition	Rider	Country	Location
February 20	Tour of California, Stage 6	UCI America Tour	Levi Leipheimer (USA)	United States	Solvang
February 21	Volta ao Algarve, Stage 4	UCI Europe Tour	Alberto Contador (ESP)	Portugal	Tavira
February 22	Tour of California, Overall	UCI America Tour	Levi Leipheimer (USA)	United States	
February 22	Tour of California, Team classification	UCI America Tour	(Note: The riders on the squad were Levi Leipheimer, Lance Armstrong, Janez Brajkovič, Chris Horner, Steve Morabito, Yaroslav Popovych, José Luis Rubiera, and Grégory Rast)	United States	
February 22	Volta ao Algarve, Overall	UCI Europe Tour	Alberto Contador (ESP)	Portugal	
March 8	Paris–Nice, Stage 1	UCI World Calendar	Alberto Contador (ESP)	France	Amilly
March 13	Paris–Nice, Stage 6	UCI World Calendar	Alberto Contador (ESP)	France	La Montagne de Lure
March 15	Tirreno–Adriatico, Stage 5	UCI World Calendar	Andreas Klöden (GER)	Italy	Loreto
March 24	Vuelta a Castilla y León, Stage 2	UCI Europe Tour	Levi Leipheimer (USA)	Spain	Palencia
March 27	Vuelta a Castilla y León, Overall	UCI Europe Tour	Levi Leipheimer (USA)	Spain	
April 8	Vuelta al País Vasco, Stage 3	UCI ProTour	Alberto Contador (ESP)	Spain	Eibar
April 11	Vuelta al País Vasco, Overall	UCI ProTour	Alberto Contador (ESP)	Spain	
April 11	Vuelta al País Vasco, Stage 6	UCI ProTour	Alberto Contador (ESP)	Spain	Zalla
April 17	Sea Otter Classic, Stage 2	National event	Levi Leipheimer (USA)	United States	
April 22	Giro del Trentino, Stage 1	UCI Europe Tour	Andreas Klöden (GER)	Italy	Arco
May 3	Tour de Romandie, Sprint classification	UCI ProTour	Grégory Rast (SUI)	Switzerland	
May 24	Volta a Catalunya, Team classification	UCI World Calendar	(Note: The riders on the squad were Roman Kireyev, Alexsandr Dyachenko, Jesús Hernández, Benjamín Noval, Sérgio Paulinho, Sergey Renev, Tomas Vaitkus, and Haimar Zubeldia)	Spain	
May 31	Giro d'Italia, Trofeo Fast Team classification	UCI World Calendar	(Note: The riders on the squad were Lance Armstrong, Janez Brajkovič, Chris Horner, Levi Leipheimer, Steve Morabito, Daniel Navarro, Yaroslav Popovych, José Luis Rubiera and Andrey Zeits)	Italy	
June 3	Tour de Luxembourg, Prologue	UCI Europe Tour	Grégory Rast (SUI)	Luxembourg	Luxembourg
June 14	Critérium du Dauphiné Libéré, Team classification	UCI World Calendar	(Note: The riders on the squad were Alberto Contador, Alexsandr Dyachenko, Jesús Hernández, Benjamín Noval, Sérgio Paulinho, Sergey Renev, Tomas Vaitkus, and Haimar Zubeldia)	France	
July 7	Tour de France, Stage 4	UCI World Calendar	Team time trial (Note: The riders on the squad were Alberto Contador, Lance Armstrong, Andreas Klöden, Levi Leipheimer, Dimitry Muravyev, Sérgio Paulinho, Yaroslav Popovych, Grégory Rast and Haimar Zubeldia)	France	Montpellier
July 19	Tour de France, Stage 15	UCI World Calendar	Alberto Contador (ESP)	Switzerland	Verbier
July 23	Tour de France, Stage 18	UCI World Calendar	Alberto Contador (ESP)	France	Annecy
July 26	Tour de France, Overall	UCI World Calendar	Alberto Contador (ESP)	France	
July 26	Tour de France, Team classification	UCI World Calendar		France	
August 12	Tour de l'Ain, Points classification	UCI Europe Tour	Chris Horner (USA)	France	
