= Igor Abakoumov =

Belgian cyclist

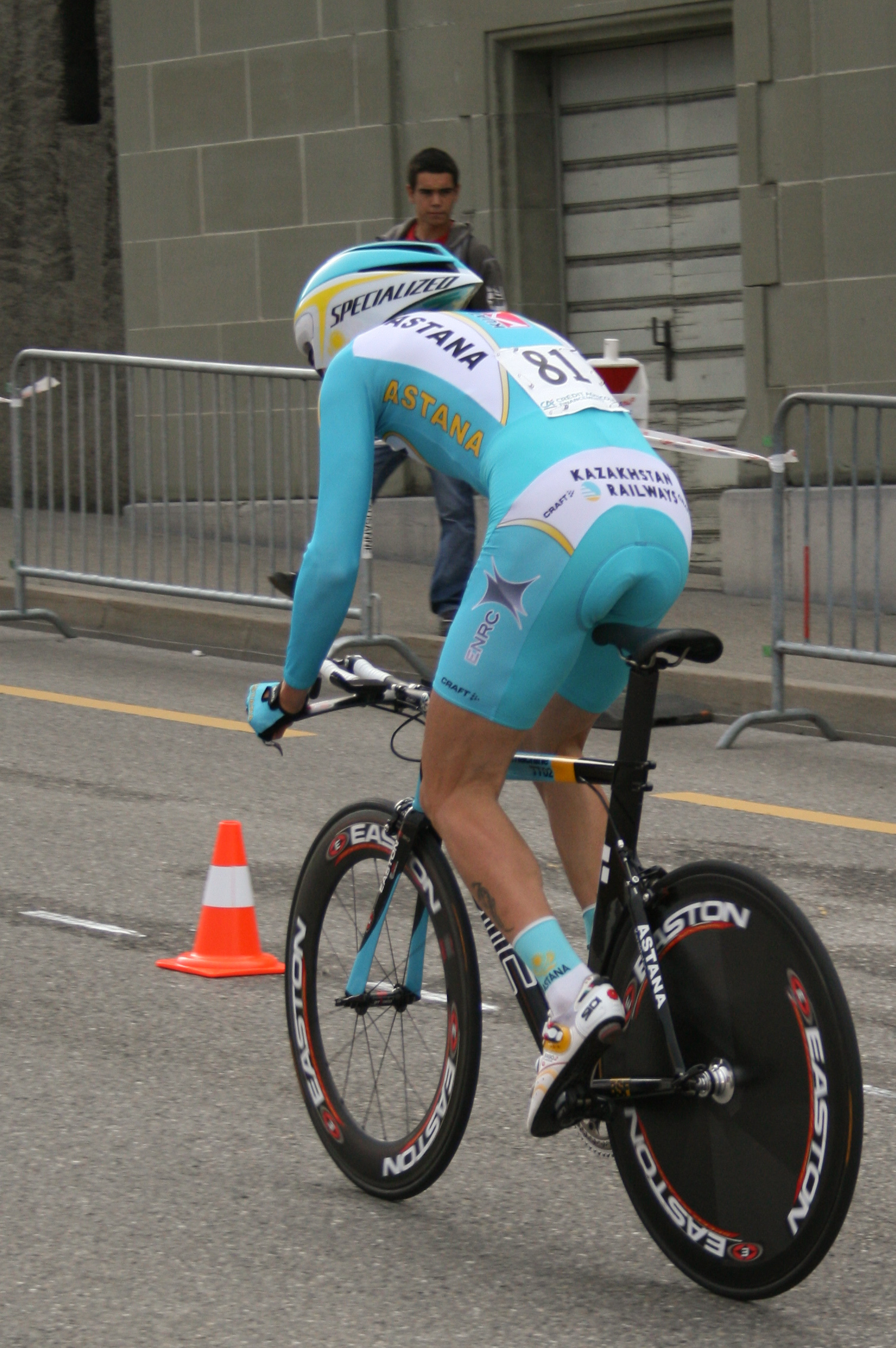
- Riding the prologue of the Tour de Romandie 2007

Personal information
- Full name: Igor Abakoumov
- Born: 30 May 1981 (age 45) Berdyansk, Ukraine
- Height: 1.80 m (5 ft 11 in)
- Weight: 68 kg (150 lb)

Cycling career
- Sport: Cycling
- Discipline: Road
- Role: Rider
- Rider type: Sprinter

Professional teams
- 2002–2003: Van Hemert Groep
- 2004: Chocolade Jacques–Wincor Nixdorf
- 2005–2006: Jartazi Granville Team
- 2007: Astana
- 2008: Mitsubishi–Jartazi
- 2009: ISD
- 2010: ISD Continental Team

Igor Abakoumov (born 30 May 1981 in Berdyansk, Ukraine) is a Belgian former professional road bicycle racer of Ukrainian origin. Abakoumov became a naturalized Belgian citizen on 15 September 2001. He turned professional in 2002. Abakumov was left in limbo by his former team, Astana, when the sponsors pulled the plug on funds following a drugs scandal. He last rode for the ISD Continental Team.

== Major results ==
1999
1st Overall GP Général Patton
2001
2nd Omloop van de Westhoek
3rd GP Claude Criquielion
2002
1st Stage 2 Okolo Slovenska
5th Flèche Ardennaise
2003
1st Romsée-Stavelot-Romsée
1st Stage 4 Volta a Tarragona
1st Stage 5 International Cycling Classic
2nd Trofee van Haspengouw
5th Ronde van Drenthe
5th Hel van het Mergelland
3rd Rund um Düren
8th GP Stad Zottegem
2004
1st Profronde van Fryslan (with 21 others)
8th Route Adélie
2005
2nd Nokere Koerse
3rd Grand Prix de Wallonie
6th Classic Loire Atlantique
8th Paris–Brussels
9th Druivenkoers-Overijse
2006
1st Stage 2 Tour de l'Ain
5th Classic Loire Atlantique
6th Brabantse Pijl
6th Dwars door Vlaanderen
8th Cholet-Pays de Loire
8th Hel van het Mergelland
8th Le Samyn
9th Flèche Hesbignonne
10th Grand Prix d'Ouverture La Marseillaise
2008
5th GP Stad Zottegem
9th Le Samyn
