= Yevgeniy Sladkov =

Kazakhstani cyclist

Evgeniy Sladkov
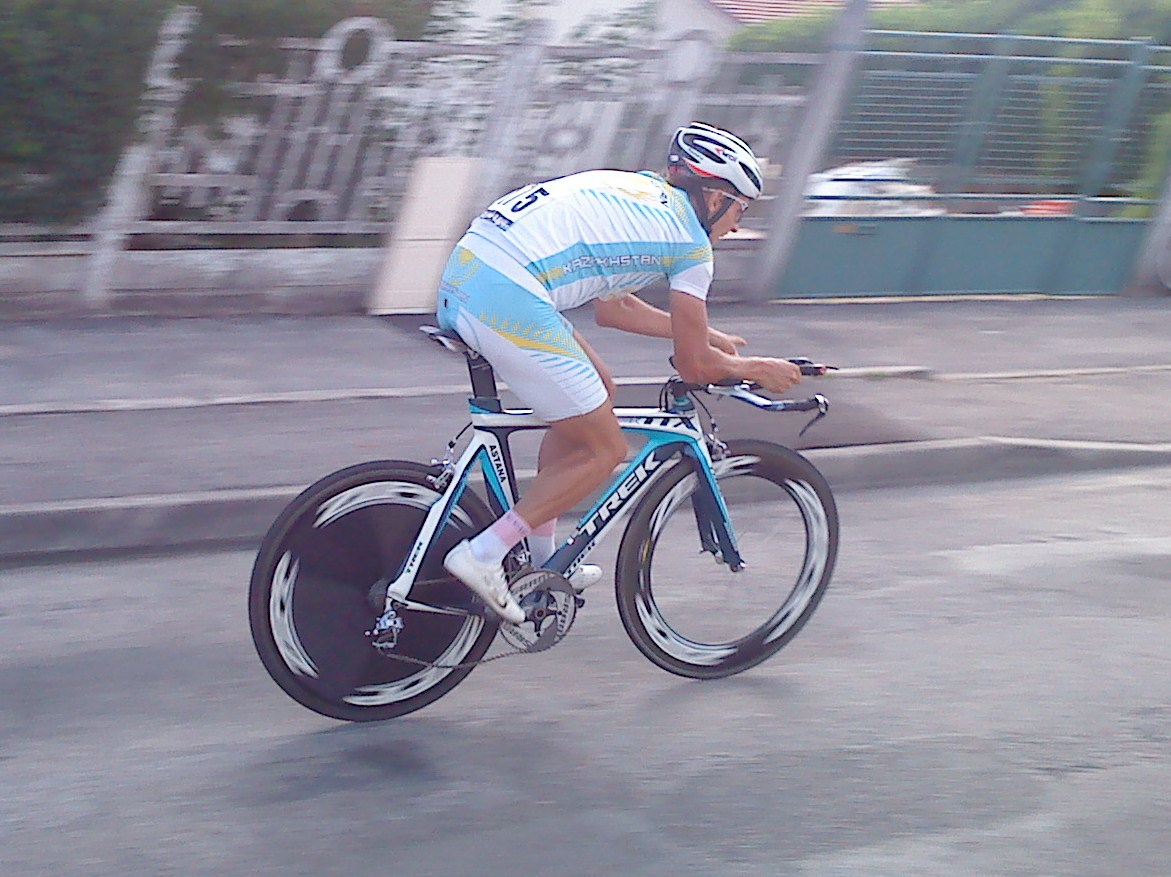

Personal information
- Full name: Evgeniy Sladkov
- Born: December 15, 1983 (age 42)
- Height: 1.75 m (5 ft 9 in)
- Weight: 63 kg (139 lb)

Cycling career
- Sport: Cycling
- Discipline: Road
- Role: Rider

Professional team
- 2007: Astana

Evgeniy Sladkov (born December 15, 1983) is a Kazakhstani professional road bicycle racer.
