= José Antonio Redondo (cyclist) =

Spanish racing cyclist (born 1985)

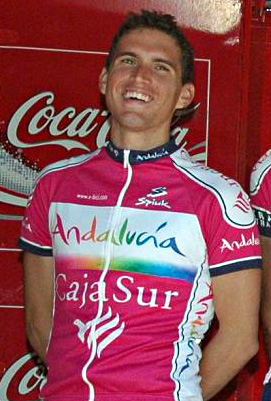

Personal information
- Full name: José Antonio Redondo Ramos
- Born: March 5, 1985 (age 41) Alcázar de San Juan, Spain

Cycling career
- Sport: Cycling
- Discipline: Road
- Role: Rider

Professional teams
- 2005–2006: Liberty Seguros–Würth
- 2007: Astana
- 2008–2009: Andalucía–CajaSur

José Antonio Redondo Ramos (born 5 March 1985 in Alcázar de San Juan) is a Spanish former racing cyclist who last rode for UCI Professional Continental team Andalucía–CajaSur.

In 2007, riding for Astana, Redondo finished second in the 2nd stage of both the Critérium du Dauphiné Libéré and the Vuelta al País Vasco. Redondo was sacked from Astana in September 2007 after "failing to abide by team rules".

== Major results ==
- 2006 Vuelta a España – 47th
- National Time Trial U23 Championship – 3rd (2005)
