= Berik Kupeshov =

Kazakhstani cyclist

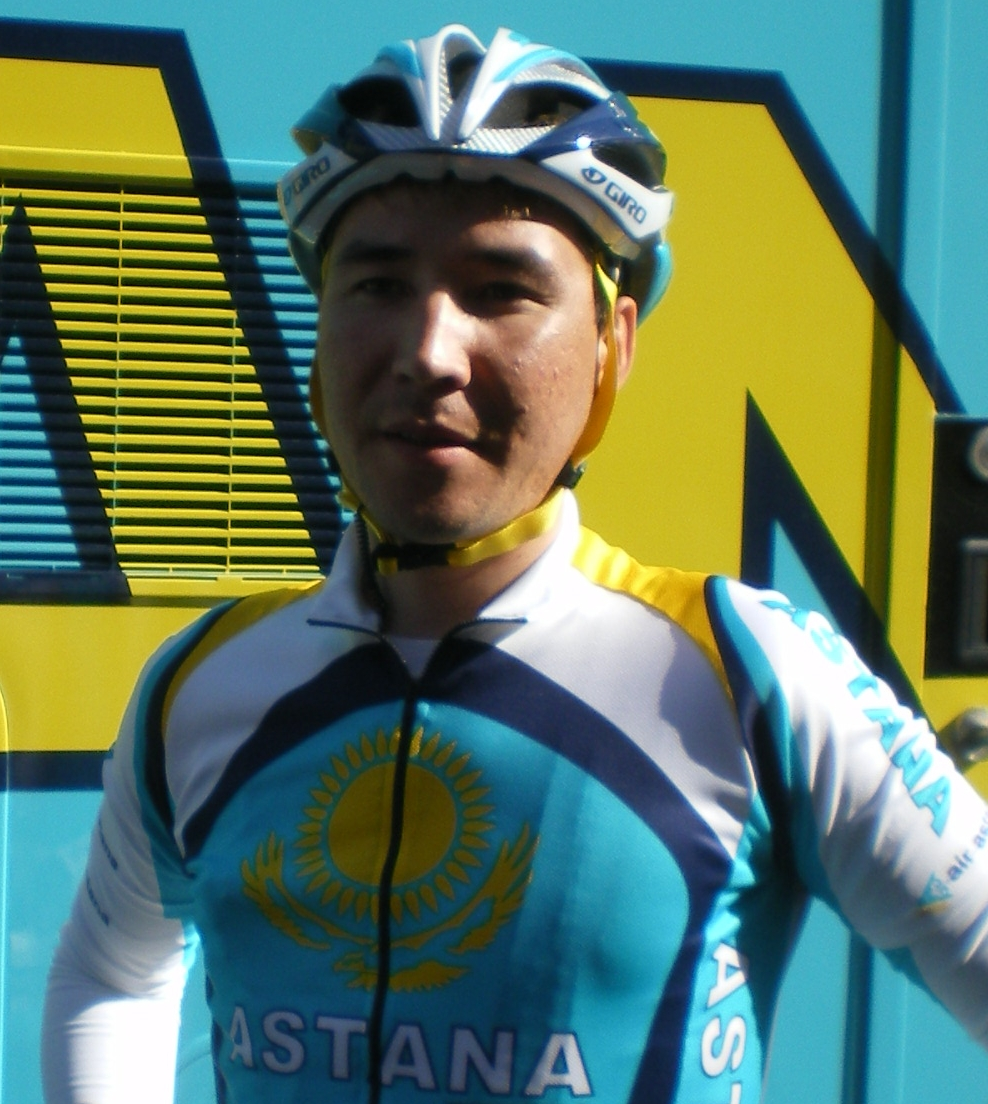

Personal information
- Full name: Berik Kupeshov
- Born: 30 January 1987 (age 39)

Cycling career
- Sport: Cycling
- Current team: XDS Astana Team
- Disciplines: Road, track
- Role: Rider

Amateur team
- 2007: Storez-Ledecq Matériaux

Professional team
- 2008–2009: Astana

Berik Kupeshov (Kazakh: Берік Көпешов; born 30 January 1987) is a Kazakhstani road bicycle racer who formerly rode for UCI ProTeam Astana.

== Major results ==
2004
(bronze) , Asian Junior Games, Scratch
2005
(silver) , Asian Junior Games, Pursuit
