= Roman Kireyev =

Kazakhstani cyclist (born 1987)

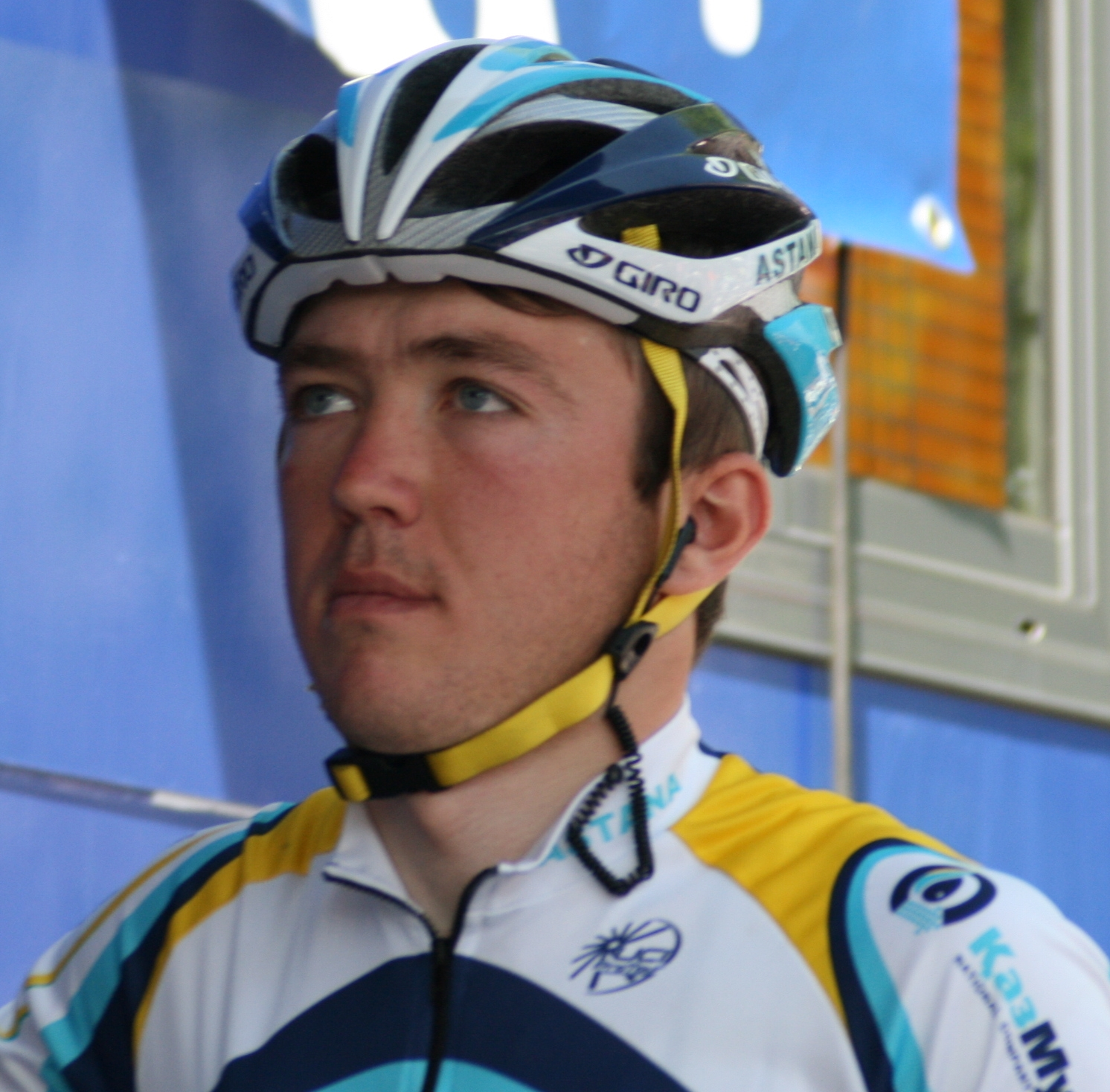

Personal information
- Full name: Roman Kireyev
- Born: 14 February 1987 (age 39) Petropavl, Kazakhstan

Cycling career
- Sport: Cycling
- Discipline: Road
- Role: Retired

Professional team
- 2008–2011: Astana

Roman Kireyev (born 14 February 1987) is a former Kazakhstani road bicycle racer who rode for UCI ProTeam XDS Astana Team.

On 22 August 2011 Astana announced his retirement from cycling after he had struggled with a back injury. The timing of this announcement caused speculation that Kireyev was forced into retirement to make way for Andrey Kashechkin and Alexander Vinokourov to compete. Before Kireyev's retirement, Astana was afoul of the UCI's rules regarding the maximum number of riders employed by a team.

== Major results ==
2004
(bronze) , Asian Junior Games, Road Race
(bronze) , Asian Junior Games, Ind. Time Trial
2005
3rd, Giro della Toscana – U19 version
2006
Kazakhstan U23 Road Race Champion
