= Julien Mazet =

French cyclist

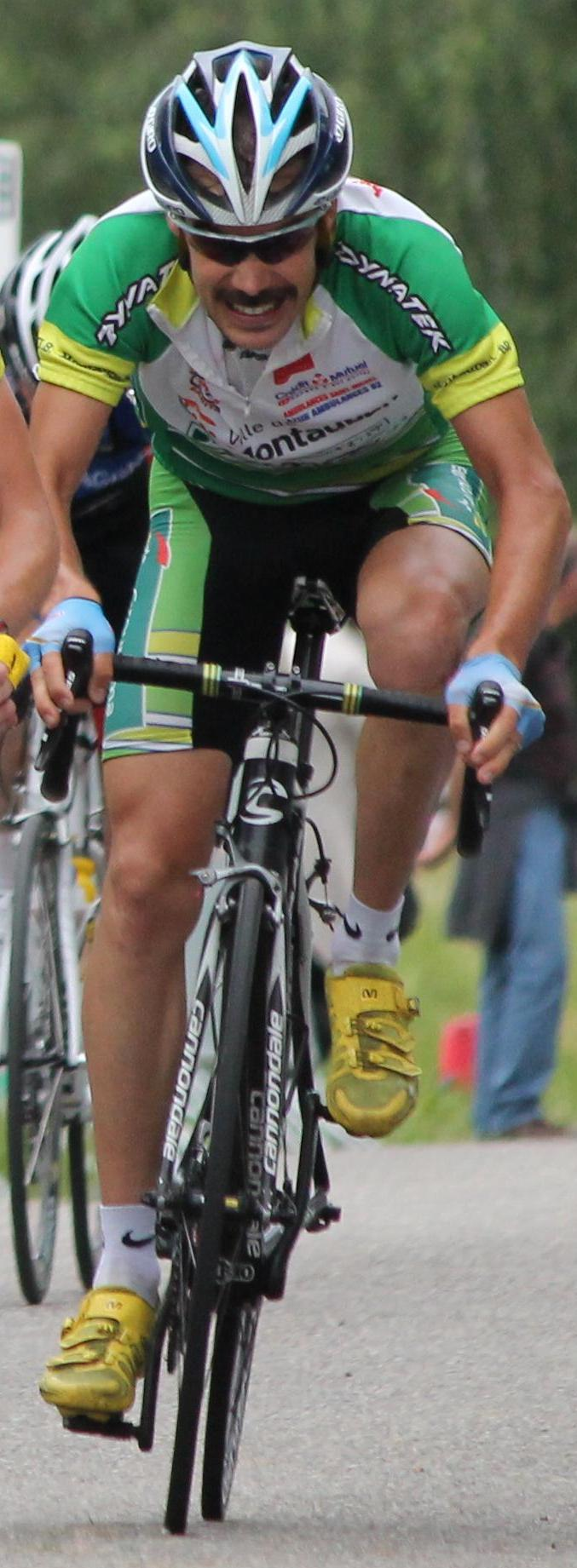

Personal information
- Full name: Julien Mazet
- Born: 16 March 1981 (age 45) Villeneuve-sur-Lot, France
- Height: 1.79 m (5 ft 10 in)
- Weight: 63 kg (139 lb)

Cycling career
- Sport: Cycling
- Current team: Retired
- Discipline: Road
- Role: Rider

Amateur teams
- 2000: Guidon Agenais
- 2001: Super Sport-23 La Creuse-en-Limousin
- 2002–2004: Crédit Agricole Espoirs
- 2011: GSC Blagnac
- 2012: US Montauban 82
- 2013: CRC Limousin

Professional teams
- 2005–2006: Auber 93
- 2007–2008: Astana
- 2009–2010: Auber 93

Julien Mazet (born 16 March 1981 in Villeneuve-sur-Lot) is a French former professional road bicycle racer.

== Major results ==
2003
1st Time trial, National Under-23 Championships
1st La Transalsace
1st Trophée des Sources
2004
4th Overall Giro della Valle d'Aosta

1st Stages 1 & 5

4th Overall Vuelta a Navarra
2005
1st Stage 1 Tour de la Manche
4th Tour du Jura
5th Overall Tour de la Somme
6th Overall Tour du Limousin
7th Overall Route du Sud
9th Overall Tour de l'Ain
9th Grand Prix d'Ouverture La Marseillaise
2006
3rd Overall Route du Sud
5th Overall Tour de l'Avenir
5th Grand Prix Cristal Energie
6th Tour du Jura
9th Tour du Doubs
2007
5th Overall Herald Sun Tour
2009
2nd Tour du Doubs
6th Overall Les 3 Jours de Vaucluse
6th Cholet-Pays de Loire
8th Tour du Finistère
2010
6th Tour du Doubs

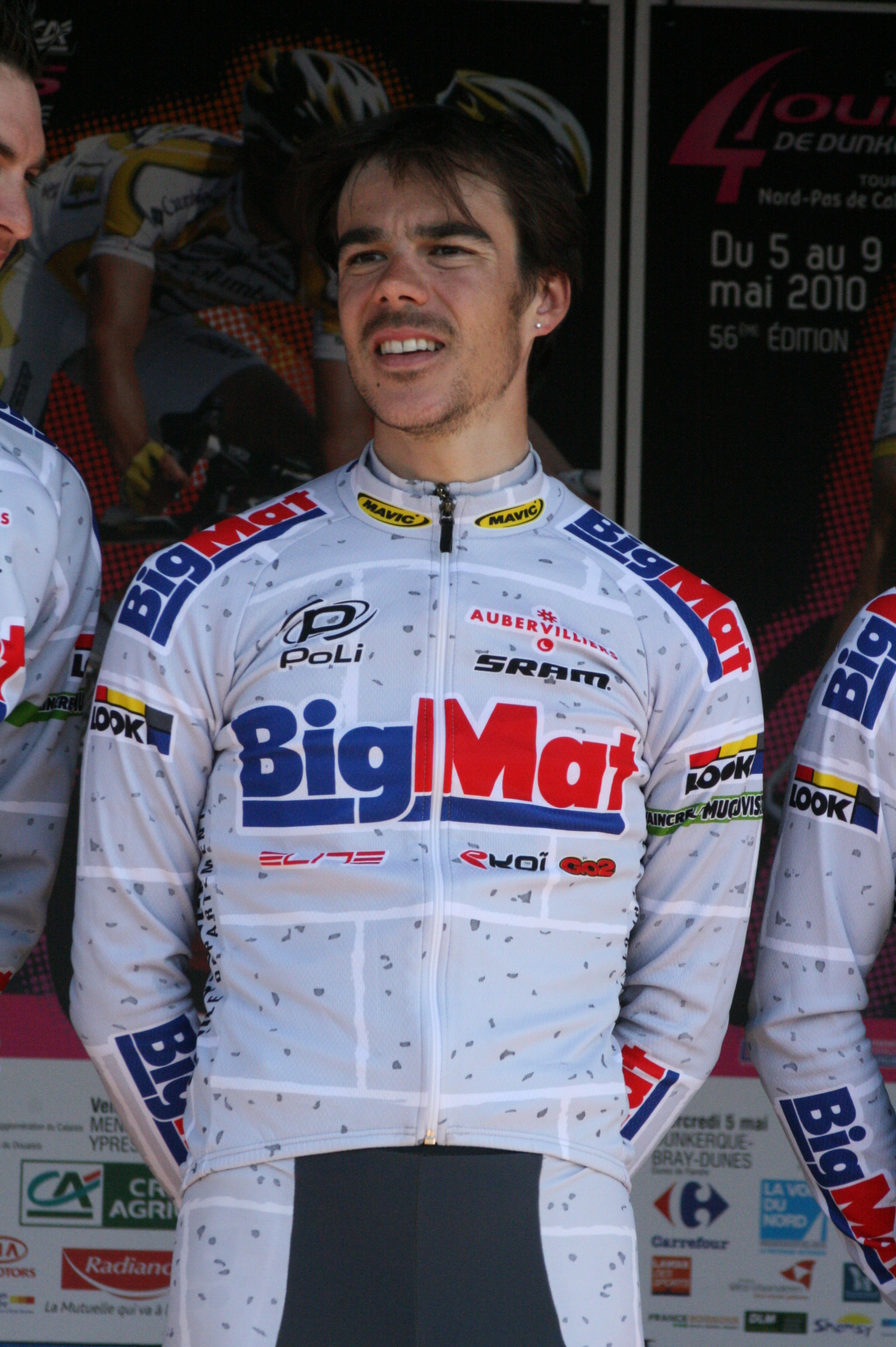
Mazet at the 2010 Four Days of Dunkirk
