= Thomas Frei =

Swiss cyclist (born 1985)

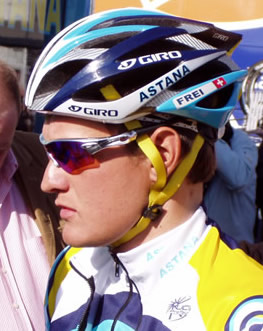

Personal information
- Full name: Thomas Frei
- Born: January 19, 1985 (age 41) Lausanne, Switzerland

Cycling career
- Sport: Cycling
- Discipline: Road
- Role: Rider

Amateur team
- 2004–2006: Bürgis

Professional teams
- 2007–2008: Astana
- 2009–2010: BMC Racing Team
- 2012: Christina Watches–Onfone

Major wins
- 1st stage 5, 2009 GP Tell

Thomas Frei (born 19 January 1985) is a Swiss road bicycle racer. Frei was Swiss Junior champion in road cycling in 2002. Between 2004 and 2006 he cycled for the Bürgis Cycling Team and won the Mountain Championship for U23 cyclists. In the 2007 and 2008 seasons, Frei rode for UCI ProTour team Astana before moving to BMC Racing Team for 2009 on a two-year contract. There he was roommate and domestique for future Tour de France champion Cadel Evans.

In his second season with BMC, Frei tested positive for EPO. He was withdrawn from competition by his team in April 2010 during the Giro del Trentino when the doping violation was revealed, before the team released him altogether.

As of August 2011, Frei was training full-time with the intention of returning to professional cycling upon the completion of his two-year suspension from competition.

== Major results ==
2002
National Junior Road Championships

1st Road race
3rd Time trial

1st Mountainrun Bowil-Chuderhüsi
2nd Mountainrun Silenen-Amsteg-Bristen
2nd Habsburgrundfahrt
3rd Gerzenseerundfahrt
3rd Rund um die Rigi
3rd Varese
2003
2nd Mountain zeitfahren Niederbipp
3rd Overall Grand Prix Rüebliland

1st Stage 3

2006
1st Swiss Cycling Championship Team Time Trial
1st Swiss Cycling Championship Mountain u23
1st La Brevine Team Time Trial
2nd Swiss Cycling Championship Mountain Elite/Profi
2nd Swiss Cycling Championship Individual Time Trial u23
3rd Wileroltigen
3rd Gansingen
4th Overall GP Tell

1st Mountains classification

8th Overall Mainfranken-Tour

1st Mountains classification

2009
1st Stage 5 GP Tell
2012
1st Stage 1 Tour of China I (TTT)
2nd Time trial, National Road Championships
