= Assan Bazayev =

Kazakh road bicycle racer

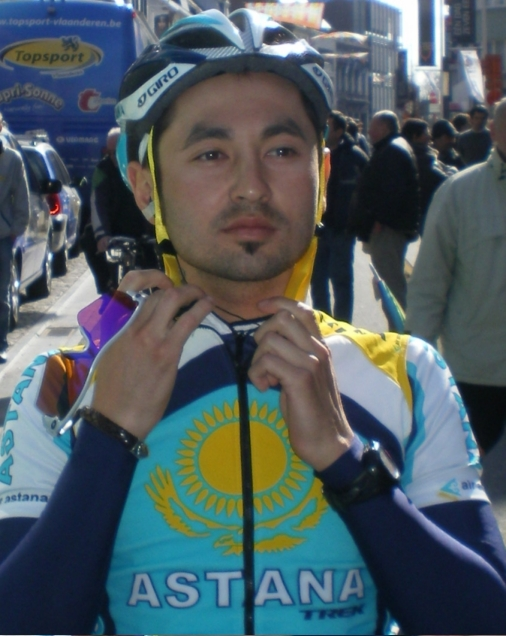
- Bazayev at the 2008 Driedaagse van West-Vlaanderen.

Personal information
- Full name: Assan Bazayev; Асан Базаев
- Born: 22 February 1981 (age 45) Almaty, Soviet Union
- Height: 1.71 m (5 ft 7 in)
- Weight: 67 kg (148 lb; 10.6 st)

Cycling career
- Sport: Cycling
- Current team: Retired
- Discipline: Road
- Role: Rider

Professional teams
- 2004–2005: Capec
- 2006: Liberty Seguros–Würth
- 2007–2013: Astana

Major wins
- National Road Race Championships (2008, 2012)

Assan Tolegenovich Bazayev (Kazakh: Асан Төлегенұлы Базаев, Russian: Асан Толегенович Базаев , born 22 February 1981) is a former professional road bicycle racer from Kazakhstan, who competed as a professional between 2004 and 2013. He competed for the Capec, Liberty Seguros–Würth and Astana squads.

In 2004 he won the Hellas Tour, but he did not win any stage. He also won stage 1 of the 2006 Tour of Germany in August 2006.

Bazayev retired at the end of the 2013 season, after ten years as a professional.

== Career achievements ==
=== Major results ===
2003
1st Stage 1 GP Tell
1st Stage 4 Tour of Bulgaria
2004
1st Overall Tour of Hellas
1st Time trial, Asian Road Championships
2005
3rd Tour de l'Avenir
3rd Kampioenschap van Vlaanderen
2006
1st Stage 1 Deutschland Tour
2008
1st Road race, National Road Championships
Presidential Cycling Tour of Turkey

1st Points classification

2009
5th Tour de Luxembourg
2010
2nd Road race, National Road Championships
8th UCI Road World Championships
2012
1st Road race, National Road Championships

=== Grand Tour general classification results timeline ===
Grand Tour	2006	2007	2008	2009	2010	2011	2012	2013
Giro d'Italia	—	98	97	—	—	—	—	—
Tour de France	—	—	—	—	—	—	—	168
Vuelta a España	98	—	130	130	82	—	DNF	—

Legend
—	Did not compete
DNF	Did not finish
