= Grégory Rast =

Swiss road bicycle racer

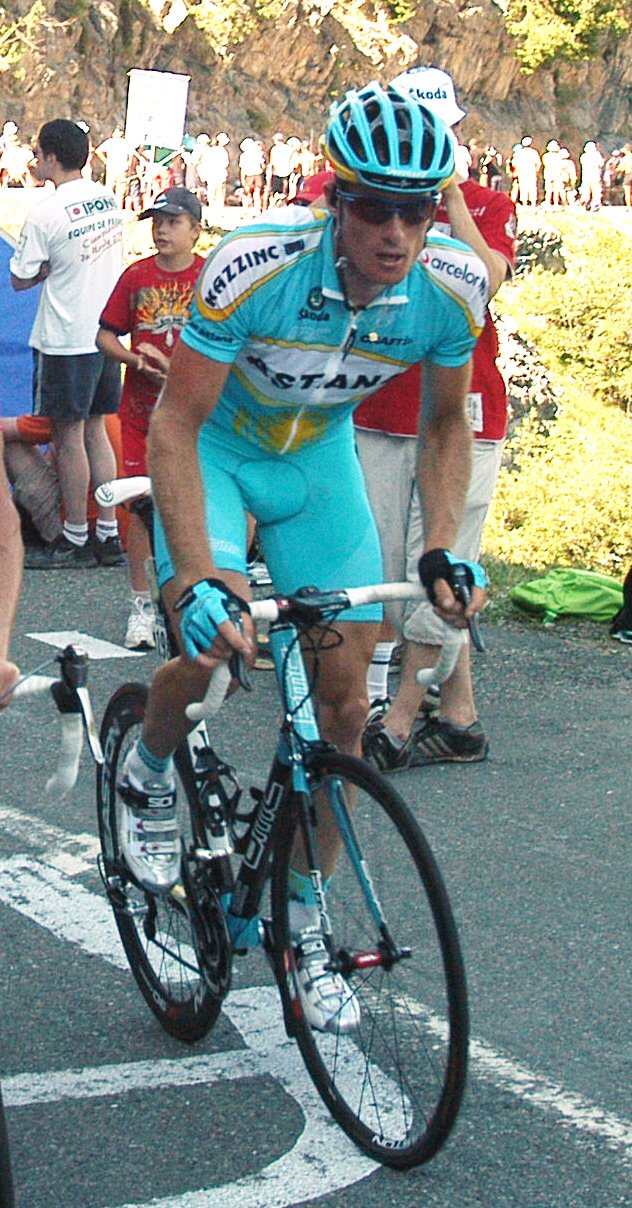
- Rast at the 2007 Tour de France

Personal information
- Full name: Grégory Rast
- Born: 17 January 1980 (age 46) Cham, Switzerland
- Height: 1.86 m (6 ft 1 in)
- Weight: 80 kg (176 lb)

Cycling career
- Sport: Cycling
- Current team: Lidl–Trek
- Discipline: Road
- Role: Rider (retired); Directeur sportif
- Rider type: Classics specialist

Amateur teams
- 2000: Post Swiss Team (stagiaire)
- 2002: Phonak (stagiaire)

Professional teams
- 2001: Post Swiss Team
- 2003–2006: Phonak
- 2007–2009: Astana
- 2010–2011: Team RadioShack
- 2012–2018: RadioShack–Nissan

Managerial team
- 2019–: Trek–Segafredo (directeur sportif)

Major wins
- Grand Tours Tour de France 1 Team time trial stage (2009) Stage races Tour of Luxembourg (2007) Single-day races and Classics National Road Race Championships (2004, 2006)

Grégory Rast (born 17 January 1980 in Cham) is a Swiss former professional road bicycle racer, who rode professionally between 2001 and 2018 for the Post Swiss Team, Phonak, Astana, Team RadioShack and Trek–Segafredo teams. He was the winner of the Swiss National Road Race Championships in 2004 and 2006. Rast now works as a directeur sportif for the Lidl–Trek team. His sporting career began with RMV Cham-Hagendorn.

== Major results ==
2002
1st Road race, National Under-23 Road Championships
3rd Overall Grand Prix Guillaume Tell

1st Stage 4

3rd La Côte Picarde
4th Grand Prix de Waregem
9th GP Kranj
2003
8th Trofeo Alcudia
8th Stausee-Rundfahrt Klingnau
2004
1st Road race, National Road Championships
4th Rund um den Henninger Turm
2005
3rd Paris–Bourges
7th Stausee-Rundfahrt Klingnau
2006
1st Road race, National Road Championships
2nd Giro del Piemonte
3rd Grand Prix of Aargau Canton
6th Vattenfall Cyclassics
9th GP Ouest France-Plouay
2007
1st Overall Tour de Luxembourg

1st Stage 4

7th Trofeo Calvia
2008
1st Grand Prix Istanbul
5th Overall Four Days of Dunkirk
6th Overall Tour of Poland
7th Trofeo Sóller
9th Brabantse Pijl
2009
1st Stage 4 (Team time trial) Tour de France
1st Prologue Tour de Luxembourg
1st Sprints classification Tour de Romandie
2010
9th Overall Tour de Luxembourg
9th Kuurne–Brussels–Kuurne
2011
4th Paris–Roubaix
2012
8th Road race, Olympic Games
2013
1st Stage 6 Tour de Suisse
5th Road race, National Road Championships
2014
5th Road race, National Road Championships
2015
1st Stage 1 (Team time trial) Tour of Alberta
