= Aaron Kemps =

Australian racing cyclist

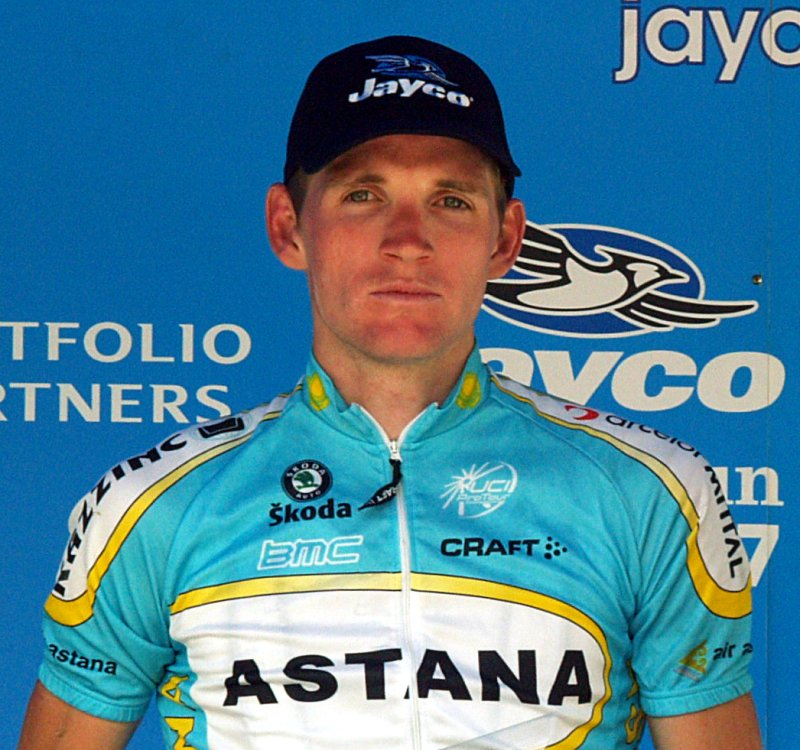

Personal information
- Full name: Aaron Kemps
- Born: 10 September 1983 (age 43) Bundaberg, Australia

Cycling career
- Sport: Cycling
- Discipline: Road
- Role: Rider

Amateur team
- 2004: Quick-Step–Davitamon (stagiaire)

Professional teams
- 2005–2006: Liberty Seguros–Würth
- 2007–2008: Astana
- 2009: Rock Racing
- 2010–2011: Fly V Australia
- 2012: Champion System

Aaron Kemps (born 10 September 1983 in Bundaberg, Queensland) is an Australian racing cyclist.

== Major results ==
2001
3rd Points race, UCI Junior Track World Championships
2003
1st Stage 6 Giro delle Regioni
1st Stage 1 Girobio
2004
1st Coppa Citta' di Asti
2005
3rd Stage 6 Paris–Nice
2006
1st Stage 1 Vuelta Ciclista a Burgos
2007
1st Herald Sun Classic
1st Stages 3 & 7 Herald Sun Tour
1st Noosa International Criterium
2009
4th Noosa International Criterium
8th Overall Herald Sun Tour
2010
1st National Criterium Championships
2011
1st Stage 1 Tour of Qinghai Lake
