= 2011 BMC Racing Team season =

2011 BMC Racing Team season
Manager	John Lelangue
One-day victories	1
Stage race overall victories	4
Stage race stage victories	6
Previous season • Next season

The 2011 season for the BMC Racing Team began in January with the Tour Down Under and ended in October at the Giro di Lombardia. As a UCI ProTeam, they were automatically invited and obligated to send a squad to every event in the UCI World Tour.

Team captain Cadel Evans provided the majority of their victories in 2011, most notably the overall crown at the Tour de France. Twice a runner-up at that race, and at age 34 the oldest post-World War II winner, Evans took used a different race program than he had in previous years. He rode relatively few races prior to the Tour, though he was also the overall victor at Tirreno–Adriatico and the Tour de Romandie.

Though often considered to be a team with a strong classics pedigree, and active in most races with several top tens, they did not win any single-day race in the spring season. Greg Van Avermaet won the late-season Paris–Tours, along with two stages in stage races earlier in the season. The team's ostensible classics leader, Italian Alessandro Ballan, did not win any race in 2011 and was again briefly suspended from racing pursuant to the ongoing Mantova doping investigation, as he had been in 2010.

== 2011 roster ==
Ages as of January 1, 2011.

Rider	Date of birth
Alessandro Ballan (ITA)	November 6, 1979 (aged 31)
Chris Barton (USA)	June 7, 1988 (aged 22)
Chad Beyer (USA)	August 15, 1986 (aged 24)
Brent Bookwalter (USA)	February 16, 1984 (aged 26)
Marcus Burghardt (GER)	June 30, 1983 (aged 27)
Chris Butler (USA)	February 16, 1988 (aged 22)
Yannick Eijssen (BEL)	June 26, 1989 (aged 21)
Cadel Evans (AUS)	February 14, 1977 (aged 33)
Mathias Frank (SUI)	December 9, 1986 (aged 24)
George Hincapie (USA)	June 29, 1973 (aged 37)
Martin Kohler (SUI)	July 17, 1985 (aged 25)
Alexander Kristoff (NOR)	July 5, 1987 (aged 23)
Karsten Kroon (NED)	January 29, 1976 (aged 34)
Jeff Louder (USA)	December 8, 1977 (aged 33)

Rider	Date of birth
Amaël Moinard (FRA)	February 2, 1982 (aged 28)
Steve Morabito (SUI)	January 30, 1983 (aged 27)
John Murphy (USA)	December 15, 1984 (aged 26)
Taylor Phinney (USA)	June 27, 1990 (aged 20)
Manuel Quinziato (ITA)	October 30, 1979 (aged 31)
Timothy Roe (AUS)	October 28, 1989 (aged 21)
Mauro Santambrogio (ITA)	October 7, 1984 (aged 26)
Ivan Santaromita (ITA)	April 30, 1984 (aged 26)
Michael Schär (SUI)	September 29, 1986 (aged 24)
Johann Tschopp (SUI)	July 1, 1982 (aged 28)
Greg Van Avermaet (BEL)	May 17, 1985 (aged 25)
Danilo Wyss (SUI)	August 26, 1985 (aged 25)
Simon Zahner (SUI)	March 8, 1983 (aged 27)

Riders who joined the team for the 2011 season

Rider	2010 team
Yannick Eijssen	neo-pro
Amaël Moinard	Cofidis
Taylor Phinney	stagiaire (Team RadioShack)
Manuel Quinziato	Liquigas–Doimo
Timothy Roe	Trek-Livestrong
Ivan Santaromita	Liquigas–Doimo
Johann Tschopp	Bbox Bouygues Telecom
Greg Van Avermaet	Omega Pharma–Lotto

Riders who left the team during or after the 2010 season

Rider	2011 team
Thomas Frei	Suspended
Cole House	Realcyclist.com
Jackson Stewart	Retired
Alexandre Moos	BMC Mountain Biking
Florian Stalder	Retired
Scott Nydam	Retired

== One-day races ==
=== Spring classics ===
BMC was active at two of the traditional season-opening races, attaining seventh place with Ballan in the Italian opener Trofeo Laigueglia, and eighth with Quinziato in the Belgian opener, Omloop Het Nieuwsblad. Ballan narrowly missed victory a week later at Montepaschi Strade Bianche, finishing second at the line behind Philippe Gilbert. Ballan acknowledged that Gilbert and not he had used the optimal tactics in the final sprint, but felt nonetheless pleased with his early-season form. The two had been part of a 19-rider group that made all the selections through the sectors of unpaved roads before the finish on cobblestones in Siena.

At the first monument race of the season, Milan–San Remo, BMC was one of only two teams to have more than three riders present in the leading group on the road after a crash on the Le Manie climb 90 kilometers (56 mi) from the finish effectively split the field in two. With both teams lacking field sprinters, and with sprinters Tom Boonen, Alessandro Petacchi, and Heinrich Haussler surviving the split, BMC captain Ballan and Liquigas–Cannondale's Vincenzo Nibali struck a deal that they would each send men to the front of the lead group to help keep it away from the sprinters left behind in the second group, and dislodge the sprinters in the first group if possible. The tactic worked; with domestiques from both these teams, plus Omega Pharma–Lotto, pulling at the head of the leading group, they kept their lead through to the end of the race. Ballan, and Nibali, later figured into a crucial eight-rider selection that took place on the Poggio just a few kilometers from the end of the 298 kilometers (185 mi) day of racing. Those eight riders represented eight different teams, so no one had a teammate to perform a proper leadout. After Nibali, Gilbert, and FDJ's Yoann Offredo opened up the sprint, Ballan was gapped off momentarily and could manage only fourth behind race winner Matthew Goss. Van Avermaet had also been with the first group after the split on Le Manie, and occupied first position on the road for the kilometers between the Cipressa and the descent from the Poggio, before he was caught by the select group of eight that finished together at the head of the race.

At the second monument, the Tour of Flanders, BMC was noted to be bringing a strong squad, headed by Ballan and Hincapie. Burghardt and Van Avermaet went on the attack in the early portions of the race, only to be brought back after a short while. When Fabian Cancellara put in an attack on the Leberg, the day's fourteenth cobbled climb, and quickly took a sizable time gap, it was the BMC team which organized the chase to bring him back. They placed four riders into a seven-rider chase group and succeeded in bringing Cancellara back, something which has usually not happened to him in classics races. A further two riders had remained at the head of the peloton, giving them six riders at the front of the race when Cancellara was caught. Cancellara put in another move on the Muur van Geraardsbergen and was followed only by Sylvain Chavanel and eventual race winner Nick Nuyens. Hincapie finished with the group 5 seconds back for sixth place on the day. Kristoff rode to seventh place in the sprinters' classic Scheldeprijs later in April, back of three-time winner Mark Cavendish.

Ballan also rode to a top-ten placing at the third monument, Paris–Roubaix. He and Thor Hushovd marked the accelerations of odds-on favorite Cancellara throughout the day and, with both having teammates up the road in breakaway groups, did not contribute any work. This led to the lightly heralded Johan Vansummeren from Hushovd's Garmin–Cervélo team winning the race from a solo escape, but Ballan was able to finish sixth by staying with Cancellara as best he could, losing contact only when Cancellara put in his most strenuous attack near the finish. The race came just days after Ballan was again named in the ongoing Mantova doping investigation as a rider who may have perpetrated blood doping while riding for his former team Lampre. Unlike in 2010, when these accusations broke, BMC chose not to suspend Ballan from competition. Ballan felt his suspension in 2010 was because the team had not yet attained the highest level in the sport and had to rely on wildcard invitations to attend top-level races. In 2011, they had attained UCI ProTeam status and were therefore guaranteed these invites. However, team president Jim Ochowicz denied that this was the case, saying that the team had cleared Ballan in 2010 and that the 2011 accusations were not new and therefore did not require any action on their part. However, Ballan and Santambrogio were indeed suspended and later reactivated around the time of the Giro d'Italia.

Van Avermaet was the team's top finisher at each of the Ardennes classics, though he did not come especially close to victory in any of them, finishing 24th at the 2011 Amstel Gold Race, 16th at La Flèche Wallonne, and seventh at Liège–Bastogne–Liège, the fourth monument. BMC's record at the early-season single day races ended with a series of near misses in May and June. Murphy, an essentially unknown rider on the international scene, was the sixth-place finisher at the inaugural ProRace Berlin. BMC and Leopard Trek were the only top-level professional teams in the race. Santambrogio was second at the Giro della Toscana, losing out to Garmin–Cervélo's Dan Martin in the uphill final sprint. Van Avermaet narrowly missed the podium at Halle–Ingooigem, losing the sprint for third place to FDJ's Gianni Meersman and taking fourth on the day.

The team also sent squads to the Classica Sarda, Kuurne–Brussels–Kuurne, the Giro del Friuli, Dwars door Vlaanderen, Gent–Wevelgem, and Brabantse Pijl, but finished no higher than 13th in any of these races.

=== Fall races ===
Van Avermaet opened the team's later season with a podium finish at the Clásica de San Sebastián, winning a seven-rider sprint for third place 14 seconds back of the day's winner Philippe Gilbert. Much like he had earlier in the season at Scheldeprijs, Kristoff finished in the top ten but not especially close to victory at the sprinters' classic Paris–Brussels in September, taking seventh place in a 46-rider sprint. He turned in a similar performance a week later at the Championship of Flanders, seventh from a 55-rider sprint, and two days hence at the Grand Prix d'Isbergues with fifth from a group of 57. He also added a second place, again in a large sprint, at the Grand Prix de Fourmies. Murphy took his second top-ten finish of the year at the Omloop van het Houtland, with sixth place in a breakaway sprint behind Guillaume Van Keirsbulck of Quick-Step. Van Avermaet and Phinney finished at the front of the race in Binche–Tournai–Binche, though neither threatened for victory, finishing seventh and 13th in the 13-rider lead group.

Van Avermaet took the team's lone single-day victory of the season at Paris–Tours. Despite the expectation that the race would come down to a sprint finish, Van Avermaet and other attackers provided for a different sort of finish. The sprinters' teams worked to chase down the morning breakaway, but the only effect this actually had was allowing Van Avermaet, and others, a shorter distance to bridge from the main field up to the front of the race. The leading group's advantage over the peloton never exceeded two minutes, but it proved to be enough as Van Avermaet took the win ahead of Vacansoleil–DCM's Marco Marcato, with the next rider a further 15 seconds down. Van Avermaet was also the team's best finisher at the Italian races which traditionally conclude the season. He just missed out on victory at the Giro del Piemonte, finishing second of 11 riders in a breakaway sprint behind Daniel Moreno of Team Katusha. He was more distant, 12th, in the Giro di Lombardia, though this was nonetheless a strong result for him due to that race's much hillier profile.

The team also sent squads to Vattenfall Cyclassics, the GP Ouest-France, the Grand Prix Cycliste de Montréal, the Grand Prix Cycliste de Québec, and the Grand Prix de Wallonie, but finished no higher than 14th in any of these races.

== Stage races ==
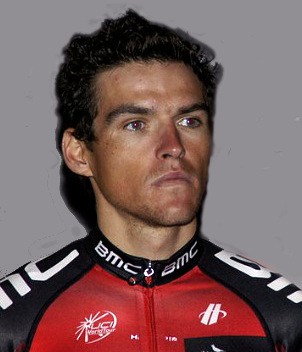
New acquisition Greg Van Avermaet won the points classification at the Tour of Austria, the overall classification at the Tour de Wallonie, and stages at both events.

Evans took the team's first wins at Tirreno–Adriatico. Despite the fact that he had raced only two days prior to Tirreno–Adriatico on the 2011 season, as part of a planned light program meant to culminate in victory at the Tour de France, Evans showed fine form at the race of the two seas. He finished near the front of the race in the first two hilly stages, both of them 240 kilometers (150 mi) in length, and took the race lead after the second of them. The next day, he won the stage into Macerata, extending his race lead to nine seconds. With only a very short individual time trial remaining, and the riders directly behind Evans in the overall standings lesser than him in time trial skills, nine seconds was a significant advantage. Evans managed only 12th in the 9.3 kilometers (5.8 mi) race against the clock that closed out the race, but this was easily enough to preserve his overall victory. In April, Evans won the Tour de Romandie without winning any stage. His greatest time win came in the stage 4 individual time trial. Sitting third at that point, he finished eighth on the day and took sufficient time to overtake Pavel Brutt and Alexander Vinokourov to move into the race lead. The flat final stage provided for no meaningful changes to the overall standings, securing Evans' win. While he did not win anything at the Critérium du Dauphiné, Evans showed strongly at that race as well. While Bradley Wiggins proved by far the strongest of the overall classification riders in the stage 3 individual time trial, Evans' sixth place on the day moved him up to second overall. He finished sufficiently near the front of the race on all other days as well, assuring him second place overall in the event.

The team's principal winner in the later season was Van Avermaet. At the Tour of Austria, he won stage 6 in a photo finish from a breakaway, besting HTC–Highroad's Matt Brammeier by the thinnest of margins. He took the points jersey with this stage win, adding a first to a fourth and an eighth place secured earlier in the event, and won it at the event's conclusion. Van Avermaet next triumphed at the Tour de Wallonie. He and Vacansoleil–DCM's Joost van Leijen were the only two riders to finish at the front of the race in each of the first two stages. Though van Leijen won stage 2, Van Avermaet took the race lead because of his higher finish on stage 1. This stage occurred on the same day that Evans sealed his Tour de France championship in Paris; the team posted news of Van Avermaet's race leadership by calling it the "other yellow jersey" they had taken. Van Avermaet successfully retained the race lead to the event's conclusion, adding a stage win on the last day, beating out van Leijen.

The team took a further two victories in August. Phinney earned the first win of his professional career in the prologue time trial at the Eneco Tour, finishing the 5.7 kilometers (3.5 mi) course 7 seconds faster than Edvald Boasson Hagen in second place. Hincapie returned to the winners' circle for the first time in two years at the USA Pro Cycling Challenge, finishing the best of six breakaway riders in stage 2 in Aspen.

The team also sent squads to the Tour Down Under, the Tour of Qatar, the Tour of Oman, the Giro di Sardegna, Paris–Nice, the Volta a Catalunya, the Tour of the Basque Country, the Giro del Trentino, the Tour de Suisse, the Tour of Utah, Circuit Franco-Belge, and the Tour of Beijing, but did not achieve a stage win, classification win, or podium finish in any of them.

== Grand Tours ==
=== Giro d'Italia ===
BMC came to the Giro without a real overall classification hopeful. Sporting director Fabio Baldato stated that the team's nine-man squad was designed to give them a chance at a stage win every day, with Kristoff for the sprints, Kohler, Wyss, and Zahner for the breakaways, and Tschopp and Frank for the climbs. Rounding out the squad were young Americans Barton, Beyer, and Butler, riding the Giro mainly for experience. They constituted three of the seven Americans in the Giro peloton. The team's preparation for the Giro was also affected by the Mantova investigation, which resulted in the team's banning of Ballan and Santambrogio for the second time, after a previous ban in April 2010. Again just as in 2010, the two were reactivated shortly after the Giro concluded.

The squad was middle of the pack in the stage 1 team time trial, finishing 13th of 23 teams. The squad was most active during stage 5, on the unpaved or 'white' roads into Orvieto, when Kohler went on the attack after 12 kilometers (7.5 mi) and made the principal breakaway as a single rider. His advantage ballooned to almost 13 minutes at its highest point, but when it began to fall, it did not fall precipitously at first. With 70 kilometers (43 mi) left to race, Kohler still had eight minutes on the main field. He was therefore first over the two third-category climbs on the course, and while mountains leader Gianluca Brambilla took maximum points from the peloton on both, Kohler took the green jersey from him at day's end. Kohler retained the jersey on stage 6 before seventh stage winner Bart De Clercq of Omega Pharma–Lotto assumed it on Montevergine di Mercogliano. Kristoff took two top ten stage placings in the first half of the race, with fourth on stage 8 (second from the peloton behind the attacking Oscar Gatto and Alberto Contador), and ninth on stage 10 (a more traditional field sprint ). Tschopp finished the best of the team's six riders to reach the finish, finishing 16th overall. The team also shared the Fair Play award with five other teams, avoiding penalty points for minor technical infringements.

=== Tour de France ===
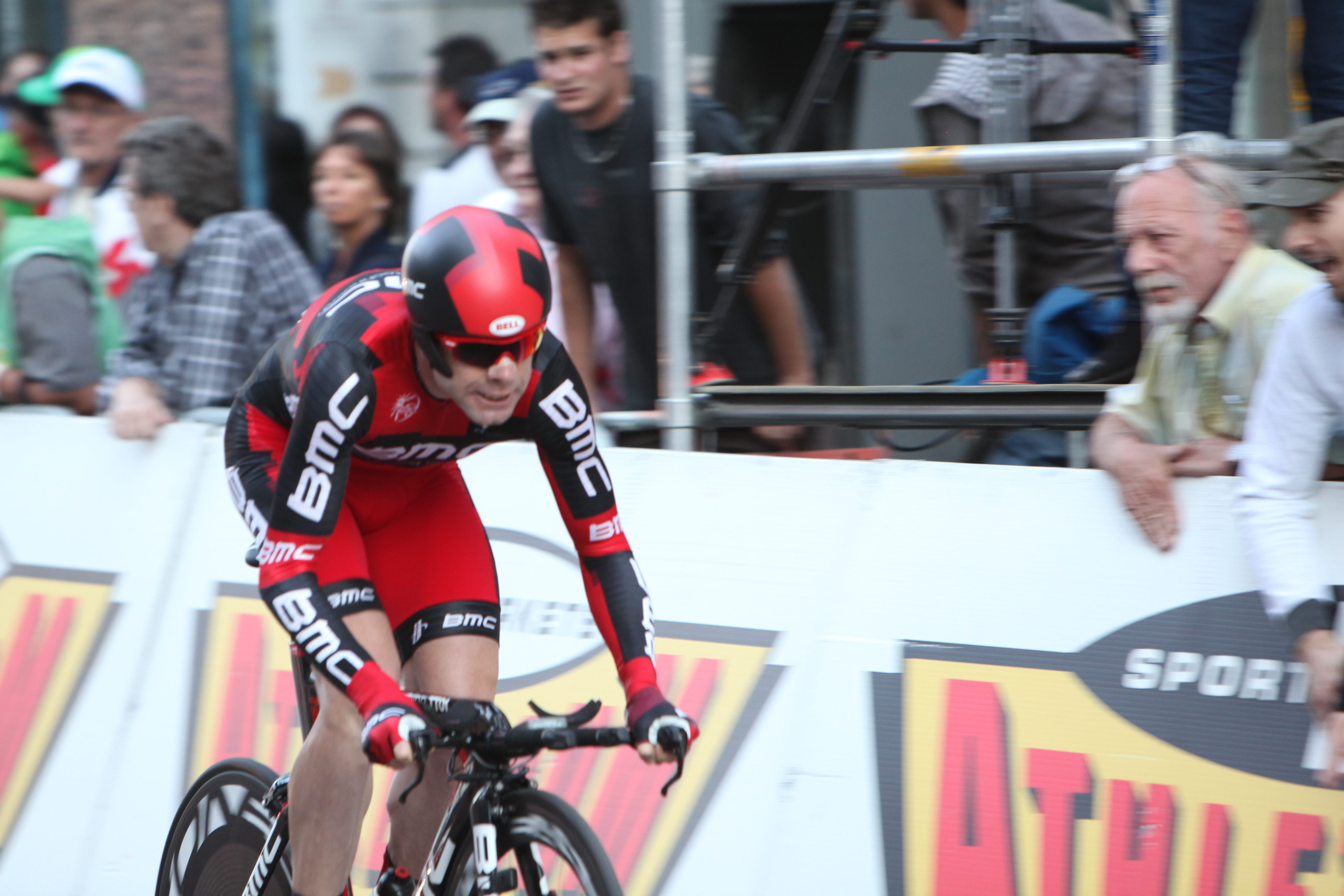
Team captain Cadel Evans won the Tour de France, thanks in large measure to his time trial skills.

The Tour de France was the main focal point of the season for BMC's leader Evans, and perhaps the team itself. He had ridden two Grand Tours each of the past two seasons, and in three of the past four, but in 2011 he focused solely on the Tour. He rode a different race program in preparation for the Tour than he had in previous years, riding fewer races. Among them were the early-season stage races Tirreno–Adriatico and Tour de Romandie, both of which Evans won, and the Critérium du Dauphiné, where he finished on the podium in second overall. The squad named to the race was chosen with the sole goal of helping Evans win the race overall. It consisted of classics specialists Hincapie and Burghardt with the aim of keeping Evans out of trouble in the flatter stages, climbers Moinard and Morabito to help in the mountains, and strong time trialists Bookwalter and Schär (and Hincapie) for the stage 2 team time trial. Hincapie made his 16th consecutive Tour start, to tie the record held by Joop Zoetemelk, having finished each except the very first.

Evans was active in the finale of the first road race stage. Almost completely flat with a punchy uphill finish, the stage kept the peloton together most of the way before a crash 9 kilometers (5.6 mi) from the end split the field. Evans stayed out front and shadowed Philippe Gilbert on the finish atop the Mont des Alouettes. The Belgian won the stage, but Evans finished clear of the peloton for second place three seconds back. This positioned the team well for the stage 2 team time trial. Despite being considered the lesser of squads such as Garmin–Cervélo, Team Sky, and HTC–Highroad, among others, the squad finished second just four seconds back of Garmin–Cervélo, tied with Team Sky and Leopard Trek. The result left Garmin–Cervélo riders Thor Hushovd and David Millar tied on the same time at the top of the overall classification, with the Norwegian taking the yellow jersey, and Evans installed into third overall just a single second back. Evans said after the stage that he was very pleased with the team's effort and had confidence for the continuation of the race.

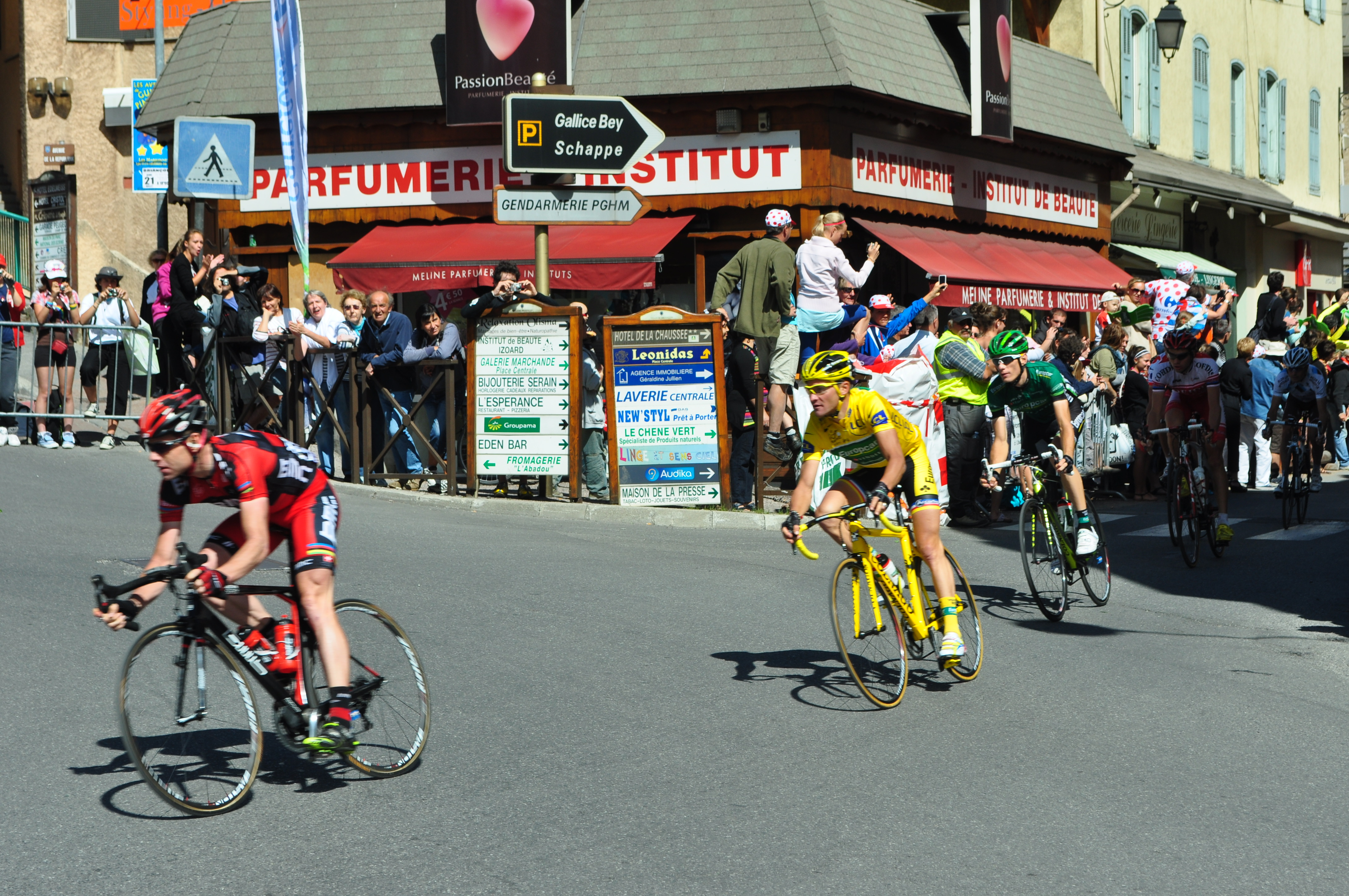
Evans on stage 18 riding in front of race leader Thomas Voeckler, before his strenuous solo pull at the end of the stage..

Stage 4, again mostly flat with an uphill finish, was another important day for the team. Evans approached the finish with a select group at the head of the race, including most of the race's overall favorites and race leader Hushovd. Evans outsprinted Alberto Contador at the finish to claim his second career Tour stage win. After finishing safely in the peloton on the next three stages, all of them favoring sprinters, Evans took third, just behind Gilbert, on Super Besse in stage 8. Despite the uphill finish and the stage's bumpy profile, Hushovd also finished in this group, meaning Evans did not, as was expected, take the yellow jersey. Though the next day featured a change of race leader, when a breakaway including Thomas Voeckler gained almost four minutes against the peloton, Evans remained well-placed in third overall. There were then no significant changes to the overall standings until stage 16. This was a medium mountain stage heading gradually uphill until a second-category climb 11 kilometers (6.8 mi) from the finish in Gap. Hushovd won the stage from a breakaway, but together with Contador and Samuel Sánchez, Evans attacked on the descent. He gained over a minute against the race's other top riders, most notably Andy Schleck.

Stage 18 was extremely important to the race's overall standings. With 60 kilometers (37 mi) still to go before the finish, Andy Schleck attacked out of the group of race favorites, and no one followed him. He made the bridge up to a teammate from the morning escape, who paced him to a maximum four-minute advantage at the front of the race. From behind, Evans put in an intensive effort from about the 10 kilometers (6.2 mi) to go mark to limit his losses. Schleck easily won the stage, but Evans remained only 57 seconds down, a time gap he could easily make up in the stage 20 individual time trial. Evans had mounted the final chase all on his own, with riders near him such as Voeckler and Ivan Basso contributing no work. Fränk Schleck took a little time out of him in view of the finish line, but no one else did, as the field finished scattered behind Evans. His long, largely solo chase was characterized as saving his overall chances after Andy Schleck had made his bid for Tour victory beforehand. The status quo largely held the next day on Alpe d'Huez, though Voeckler at last fell from the race lead, putting Andy Schleck in the yellow jersey. Schleck was characterized as missing an important chance to pad his race lead with the time trial, where Evans was recognized as the better of the two, still to race.

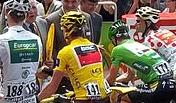
Evans wearing the yellow jersey before the start of the Tour's final stage, with the other jersey winners.

The Tour came down to the stage 20 time trial in Grenoble. While Evans was certainly the stronger of the two in the event, Schleck had surpassed expectations in the long time trial in the 2010 Tour de France and there was speculation as to whether the Luxembourger had enough time in hand to win the Tour with his 57-second cushion. They were the last two riders on the course, and rode diametrically different time trials. About an hour earlier, Tony Martin had set a dominant best time, finishing more than a minute better than any other rider in the field. Evans rode one of the best time trials of his life, seconds off Martin's pace at each time check and only seven seconds the lesser of him at the finish line. Schleck's ride was unremarkable, ceding two and a half minutes to Evans by finishing 17th on the day. What had been speculated to be a close challenge ended up being no challenge at all – Evans took the race lead by over a minute and a half. Since the Tour's final stage is largely ceremonial and not competitive for the overall classification, the time trial clinched the Tour for Evans, the first Grand Tour win in Evans' long top-level career that had featured three previous podiums and six previous top-tens. All nine BMC riders reached the Tour's finish. Evans' triumph meant that Hincapie set a new record as the only man ever to ride on nine Tour-winning squads.

Australia's prime minister phoned Evans personally to congratulate him. He was later honored with a parade and a state reception in Melbourne, with thousands of supporters attending.

=== Vuelta a España ===
Shortly after the Tour de France ended, the team reiterated Evans' season plan, that it had been his only Grand Tour for 2011 and that he would not ride the Vuelta. The team made its Vuelta debut in 2011, having ridden the Italian and French Grand Tours in 2010 via wildcard invites while receiving no such invite to the Tour of Spain. Much as at the Giro, BMC's squad for the Vuelta was chosen with stage wins in mind. Van Avermaet and Grand Tour debutant Phinney would try for the sprints, with Frank, Santaromita, and Tschopp for the climbs. Kohler, Kroon, Quinziato, and Santambrogio rounded out the squad.

In a squad with much less star power than that sent to the Tour de France, they were again middle of the pack in the team time trial, finishing 11th of 22 teams. The squad did not show themselves much, as it was not until stage 10 that they so much as finished in the top ten on a stage. Phinney took fifth place in the stage 10 individual time trial, a minute and a half off the pace of the day's winner Tony Martin. Frank rode to fourth from a breakaway in the next stage, again a minute and a half off the pace of the day's winner, this time David Moncoutié. All the team had to show for itself from the second half of the Vuelta was a seventh place from Van Avermaet in the field sprint finish to stage 12. Six BMC riders reached the Vuelta's finish, with Van Avermaet in 83rd place being their highest overall finisher.

== Season victories ==
Date	Race	Competition	Rider	Country	Location
March 14	Tirreno–Adriatico, Stage 6	UCI World Tour	Cadel Evans (AUS)	Italy	Macerata
March 15	Tirreno–Adriatico, Overall	UCI World Tour	Cadel Evans (AUS)	Italy	
May 1	Tour de Romandie, Overall	UCI World Tour	Cadel Evans (AUS)	Switzerland	
May 29	Tour of Belgium, Sprints classification	UCI Europe Tour	Marcus Burghardt (GER)	Belgium	
May 29	Giro d'Italia, Fair Play Teams classification	UCI World Tour	(Note: Six-way tie with Androni Giocattoli, HTC–Highroad, Quick-Step, Liquigas–Cannondale, and Colnago–CSF Inox)	Italy	
July 5	Tour de France, Stage 4	UCI World Tour	Cadel Evans (AUS)	France	Mûr-de-Bretagne
July 8	Tour of Austria, Stage 6	UCI Europe Tour	Greg Van Avermaet (BEL)	Austria	Bruck an der Leitha
July 10	Tour of Austria, Points classification	UCI Europe Tour	Greg Van Avermaet (BEL)	Austria	
July 24	Tour de France, Overall	UCI World Tour	Cadel Evans (AUS)	France	
July 27	Tour de Wallonie, Stage 5	UCI Europe Tour	Greg Van Avermaet (BEL)	Belgium	Thuin
July 27	Tour de Wallonie, Overall	UCI Europe Tour	Greg Van Avermaet (BEL)	Belgium	
August 8	Eneco Tour, Prologue	UCI World Tour	Taylor Phinney (USA)	Netherlands	Amersfoort
August 24	USA Pro Cycling Challenge, Stage 2	UCI America Tour	George Hincapie (USA)	United States	Aspen
October 9	Paris–Tours	UCI Europe Tour	Greg Van Avermaet (BEL)	France	Tours
