= 2010 BMC Racing Team season =

2010 BMC Racing Team season
Manager	John Lelangue
One-day victories	1
Stage race overall victories	–
Stage race stage victories	4
Previous season • Next season

The 2010 season for the BMC Racing Team began in January with the Tour Down Under and ended in October at the Giro di Lombardia. As they did in 2009, BMC Racing Team competes in 2010 as a UCI Professional Continental team with wildcard status, meaning they are eligible to be invited to any UCI ProTour event.

After three seasons as a United States–based Pro Continental team with a limited presence elsewhere in the world, BMC made numerous high-profile acquisitions in the 2009 offseason, including the last two world cycling champions in Alessandro Ballan and Cadel Evans. The team also added six other riders who were members of ProTour teams in 2009 including 2009 U.S. Road Race Champion George Hincapie.

This has assured them a greater presence in higher-profile races, evidenced by the fact they were granted the first-ever wildcard entry to the Tour Down Under and invited to the Giro d'Italia and the Tour de France.

== 2010 roster ==
Ages as of January 1, 2010

Rider	Date of birth
Alessandro Ballan (ITA)	November 6, 1979 (aged 30)
Chris Barton (USA)	June 7, 1988 (aged 21)
Chad Beyer (USA)	August 15, 1986 (aged 23)
Brent Bookwalter (USA)	February 16, 1984 (aged 25)
Marcus Burghardt (GER)	June 30, 1983 (aged 26)
Chris Butler (USA)	February 16, 1988 (aged 21)
Cadel Evans (AUS)	February 14, 1977 (aged 32)
Mathias Frank (SUI)	December 9, 1986 (aged 23)
Thomas Frei (SUI)	January 19, 1985 (aged 24)
George Hincapie (USA)	June 29, 1973 (aged 36)
Martin Kohler (SUI)	July 17, 1985 (aged 24)
Alexander Kristoff (NOR)	July 5, 1987 (aged 22)

Rider	Date of birth
Karsten Kroon (NED)	January 29, 1976 (aged 33)
Jeff Louder (USA)	December 8, 1977 (aged 32)
Alexandre Moos (SUI)	December 22, 1972 (aged 37)
Steve Morabito (SUI)	January 30, 1983 (aged 26)
John Murphy (USA)	December 15, 1984 (aged 25)
Scott Nydam† (USA)	April 9, 1977 (aged 32)
Mauro Santambrogio (ITA)	October 7, 1984 (aged 25)
Michael Schär (SUI)	September 29, 1986 (aged 23)
Florian Stalder (SUI)	September 13, 1982 (aged 27)
Jackson Stewart (USA)	June 30, 1980 (aged 29)
Danilo Wyss (SUI)	August 26, 1985 (aged 24)
Simon Zahner (SUI)	March 8, 1983 (aged 26)

†Though listed on the team's roster, Nydam is not cleared to race and did not ride competitively in 2010.

Riders who joined the team for the 2010 season

Rider	2009 team
Alessandro Ballan	Lampre–NGC
Chris Barton	neo-pro
Marcus Burghardt	Team Columbia–HTC
Cadel Evans	Silence–Lotto
George Hincapie	Team Columbia–HTC
Alexander Kristoff	Joker–Bianchi
Karsten Kroon	Team Saxo Bank
Steve Morabito	Astana
John Murphy	neo-pro
Mauro Santambrogio	Lampre–NGC
Michael Schär	Astana
Simon Zahner	neo-pro

Riders who left the team during or after the 2009 season

Rider	2010 team
Steve Bovay	Unknown
Austin Carroll	Unknown
Antonio Cruz	Rock Racing–Murcia
Jonathan Garcia	Unknown
Ian McKissick	Unknown

== One-day races ==
=== Spring classics ===
Cadel Evans won the La Flèche Wallonne, riding past Alberto Contador in the final meters of the race to take the victory. Evans also finished 5th in the Liège–Bastogne–Liège.

Additionally, George Hincapie placed 4th in the Gent–Wevelgem and 6th in the 2010 Tour of Flanders, with Karsten Kroon finishing 9th in the Amstel Gold Race

== Stage races ==
BMC raced the Tour Down Under as the first non-Pro Tour team (aside from the Australian national team) to receive an invite. This was likely to allow Evans to ride with the rainbow jersey in his home nation. Evans figured in winning breakaways in two stages, including the race's queen stage to Willunga, but did not emerge with any victories, finishing 6th.

Evans also finished 3rd in the Tirreno Adriatico, and 6th in the Critérium International.

Chad Beyer won the Sprints (Points) Classification at the 2010 Tour de Romandie, having held the Jersey for the entire race.

BMC had a successful Tour de Suisse, Steve Morabito finishing 4th overall, with Marcus Burghart winning the Points Classification and Mathias Frank winning both the King of the Mountain and the Sprints Classifications.

== Grand Tours ==
=== Giro d'Italia ===
Alessandro Ballan stated in October 2009 that it was a certainty that he would start the Giro d'Italia after missing out on it in 2009 when he wore the rainbow jersey. This was an indication that the team was in line for an invite, which they received. He was eventually withheld from competition by BMC while they investigated claims regarding his time at Lampre - the timing coincided with the Giro so he did not compete.

Evans led the squad and wore bib number one by virtue of being the reigning world champion. Evans and Santambrogio were the only riders on the squad to have previously ridden in a Grand Tour. The team showed very well in the stage 1 individual time trial. Bookwalter was a major surprise on the day, setting a provisional best time early in the stage that ended up just 2 seconds slower than stage winner Bradley Wiggins'. Evans also rode well in this stage, with the same time as Bookwalter, for third. The next day, Evans made a selection after a crash close to the stage's finish line and finished with the leaders. Neither previous race leader Wiggins nor Bookwalter did, so Evans took the pink jersey for stage 3. The team did not try to hold the jersey, and it passed to Alexander Vinokourov the next day. In the stage 4 team time trial, the team set an early provisional best time, but they were bettered by stronger squads as the day went on and finished 12th.

After the next two stages went to breakaways, stage 7 was one that proved important in the race's overall picture. It was long, and contested partly on unpaved roads, and happened to be run on a day with very heavy rain. After overnight race leader Vincenzo Nibali experienced a mechanical issue that necessitated a bike change, Evans and Damiano Cunego responded to an attack from Vinokourov, and stayed away to the stage's finish in Montalcino. Evans won the three-man sprint for the stage, with a 2-second gap. In stage 11, the Giro's longest, more than fifty riders took a 20-minute lead on the peloton before any real chase began. Bookwalter was originally in this group, but the team's manager called him back to the peloton to help Evans and make a pace. The peloton still finished 13 minutes behind the stage winner, leading to massive re-shuffling of the overall standings.

On the first of the Giro's many mountain stages in its final week, Evans rode well and stayed with the leaders through the Monte Grappa climb. He did not follow Nibali's aggressive descent of the mountain, and finished with Ivan Basso and Michele Scarponi 23 seconds back. This result moved Evans back into the top ten overall for the first time since the huge time loss in stage 11. The next day, Evans rode most of the climb of Monte Zoncolan with Basso, but he was dropped shortly before the summit, conceding over a minute to the Italian. The result did, however, move him up to fifth overall, and into the points classification lead. Evans was again second the next day, behind Stefano Garzelli, in the climbing time trial to Plan de Corones. In stage 19 to Aprica, Evans finished with the second group on the road, which tried in vain to lead then-race leader David Arroyo to the finish line fast enough to keep him in the pink jersey. After this stage, Evans was fifth overall, trailing Scarponi for fourth by a minute and 11 seconds. In stage 20, on the final ascent of the Passo del Tonale, Evans put in an attack to try to win back sufficient time to get him on the podium. Though he got yet another second place and firmly secured his victory in the points classification, he took only 9 seconds out of Scarponi as a result of the move. In the final time trial in Verona, Evans again rode well, finishing fourth at 22 seconds behind stage winner Gustav Larsson. Evans also won the Azzurri d'Italia classification. The team finished 17th in the Trofeo Fast Team standings and seventh in the Trofeo Super Team.

Evans revealed afterward that he had ridden the second half of the Giro while suffering from a stomach bug. On the night before stage 11, he went to bed with a 38 °C (100 °F) temperature and rode the stage despite team doctors urging him to retire from the race. He finished the race despite persistent stomach problems which interfered with his diet.

=== Tour de France ===
BMC entered their first ever Tour de France with a squad again led by Evans. He had found in 2009 that he had performed far better in his second Grand Tour of the season (3rd in the 2009 Vuelta a España as opposed to 30th in the 2009 Tour de France) and thus entered the Tour with high expectations. Hincapie was also part of the squad, in his 15th consecutive participation in the race. The Tour was to be BMC's second and final Grand Tour in 2010, as team president Jim Ochowicz stated that riding all three was "not doable" due to the size of the team's staff and ridership and that they would not seek a place in the 2010 Vuelta a España. Evans was mentioned in pre-race analyses as a contender for overall victory, having finished highly in several Grand Tours over his career without having won one.

After a strong showing in the individual time trial which kicked off the Giro d'Italia, Bookwalter also showed well on day one of the Tour, in its prologue. He finished in 11th place, after having been provisionally in the top five for most of the day, clocking in 35 seconds off the winning time of Fabian Cancellara. Evans was 23rd, a further four seconds back. After the peloton mostly finished together over the first two road race stages, the cobblestones visited in stage 3 broke the race open. Only six riders finished the stage together as the leading group on the road. Evans was part of this group, gaining solid time on his rivals – 53 seconds against Bradley Wiggins, Denis Menchov, and Alexander Vinokourov, a minute and 13 seconds against Alberto Contador, and over two minutes against Lance Armstrong. He sat in third place overall after the day, still 39 seconds behind Cancellara as race leader, as Cancellara had also finished with the first group in stage 3. The race's overall standings did not change again until stage 7, a medium mountain seventh stage to Station des Rousses in the Jura. A breakaway took the day's honors, and Evans moved up to second overall. In the first Alpine stage the next day, the race's elite (with the notable exception of Armstrong) contested the stage as the first group on the road. Andy Schleck and Samuel Sánchez attacked within the stage's final kilometer and gained 10 seconds against the other overall favorites, including Evans, with Schleck winning the stage. Evans did, however, assume the race leadership and the yellow jersey with the day's results.

In stage 9, after the first rest day, Evans fell precipitously from the top of the standings. He lost eight minutes to Contador and Schleck and six minutes to the majority of the race's elite, occupying 18th place after the day. What at first had seemed a catastrophic lack of form on the Col de la Madeleine was later revealed to be exacerbated by a broken elbow sustained by Evans during the previous stage. Evans continued to ride despite the injury, and finished the race in 26th place, 50 minutes and 27 seconds off the pace of Tour champion Contador. The squad was very quiet after Evans' injury, with second place in a stage 15 breakaway by Ballan being the closest they came to a victory. The squad finished 14th in the teams classification.

== Season victories ==
Date	Race	Competition	Rider	Country	Location
April 21	La Flèche Wallonne	UCI World Ranking	Cadel Evans (AUS)	Belgium	Huy
May 2	Tour de Romandie, Points classification	UCI ProTour	Chad Beyer (USA)	Switzerland	
May 15	Giro d'Italia, Stage 7	UCI World Ranking	Cadel Evans (AUS)	Italy	Montalcino
May 30	Giro d'Italia, Points classification	UCI World Ranking	Cadel Evans (AUS)	Italy	
May 30	Giro d'Italia, Azzurri d'Italia	UCI World Ranking	Cadel Evans (AUS)	Italy	
June 16	Tour de Suisse, Stage 5	UCI World Ranking	Marcus Burghardt (GER)	Switzerland	Frutigen
June 18	Tour de Suisse, Stage 7	UCI World Ranking	Marcus Burghardt (GER)	Switzerland	Wetzikon
June 20	Tour de Suisse, Mountains classification	UCI World Ranking	Mathias Frank (SUI)	Switzerland	
June 20	Tour de Suisse, Points classification	UCI World Ranking	Marcus Burghardt (GER)	Switzerland	
June 20	Tour de Suisse, Sprint classification	UCI World Ranking	Mathias Frank (SUI)	Switzerland	
August 21	Tour of Utah, Stage 4	National event	Jeff Louder (USA)	United States	Park City
