= 2012 BMC Racing Team season =

2012 BMC Racing Team season
Manager	John Lelangue
One-day victories	2
Stage race overall victories	2
Stage race stage victories	15
Previous season • Next season

The 2012 season for the BMC Racing Team began in January with the Tour Down Under. As a UCI ProTeam, they were automatically invited and obligated to send a squad to every event in the UCI World Tour.

== 2012 roster ==
Ages as of January 1, 2012.

Rider	Date of birth
Alessandro Ballan (ITA)	November 6, 1979 (aged 32)
Adam Blythe (GBR)	October 1, 1989 (aged 22)
Brent Bookwalter (USA)	February 16, 1984 (aged 27)
Marcus Burghardt (GER)	June 30, 1983 (aged 28)
Steve Cummings (GBR)	March 19, 1981 (aged 30)
Yannick Eijssen (BEL)	June 26, 1989 (aged 22)
Cadel Evans (AUS)	February 14, 1977 (aged 34)
Mathias Flückiger (Note: Flückiger joined the team on August 1, as a stagiaire, from Trek World Racing.) (SUI)	September 27, 1988 (aged 23)
Mathias Frank (SUI)	December 9, 1986 (aged 25)
Philippe Gilbert (BEL)	July 5, 1982 (aged 29)
George Hincapie (USA)	June 29, 1973 (aged 38)
Thor Hushovd (NOR)	January 18, 1978 (aged 33)
Martin Kohler (SUI)	July 17, 1985 (aged 26)
Klaas Lodewyck (BEL)	March 24, 1988 (aged 23)

Rider	Date of birth
Amaël Moinard (FRA)	February 2, 1982 (aged 29)
Steve Morabito (SUI)	January 30, 1983 (aged 28)
Taylor Phinney (USA)	June 27, 1990 (aged 21)
Marco Pinotti (ITA)	February 25, 1976 (aged 35)
Manuel Quinziato (ITA)	October 30, 1979 (aged 32)
Timothy Roe (AUS)	October 28, 1989 (aged 22)
Mauro Santambrogio (ITA)	October 7, 1984 (aged 27)
Ivan Santaromita (ITA)	April 30, 1984 (aged 27)
Michael Schär (SUI)	September 29, 1986 (aged 25)
Johann Tschopp (SUI)	July 1, 1982 (aged 29)
Greg Van Avermaet (BEL)	May 17, 1985 (aged 26)
Tejay van Garderen (USA)	August 12, 1988 (aged 23)
Larry Warbasse (Note: Warbasse joined the team on August 1, as a stagiaire, from BMC-Hincapie Sportswear.) (USA)	June 28, 1990 (aged 21)
Danilo Wyss (SUI)	August 26, 1985 (aged 26)

Riders who joined the team for the 2012 season

Rider	2011 team
Thor Hushovd	Garmin–Cervélo
Philippe Gilbert	Omega Pharma–Lotto
Marco Pinotti	HTC–Highroad
Tejay van Garderen	HTC–Highroad
Klaas Lodewyck	Omega Pharma–Lotto
Adam Blythe	Omega Pharma–Lotto
Steve Cummings	Team Sky

Riders who left the team during or after the 2011 season

Rider	2012 team
Alexander Kristoff	Team Katusha
Jeff Louder	UnitedHealthcare
John Murphy	Kenda-5-hour Energy
Chad Beyer	Competitive Cyclist
Karsten Kroon	Team Saxo Bank
Chris Barton	Bissell
Simon Zahner	EKZ Racing Team
Chris Butler	Champion System

== Season victories ==
Date	Race	Competition	Rider	Country	Location
February 19	Tour of Oman, Combative classification	UCI Asia Tour	Klaas Lodewyck (BEL)	Oman	
March 11	Paris–Nice, Young rider classification	UCI World Tour	Tejay van Garderen (USA)	France	
March 24	Critérium International, Stage 2	UCI Europe Tour	Cadel Evans (AUS)	France	Porto-Vecchio
March 25	Critérium International, Overall	UCI Europe Tour	Cadel Evans (AUS)	France	
March 25	Critérium International, Points classification	UCI Europe Tour	Cadel Evans (AUS)	France	
April 7	Tour of the Basque Country, Sprints classification	UCI World Tour	Marco Pinotti (ITA)	Spain	
April 17	Giro del Trentino, Stage 1	UCI Europe Tour	Team time trial (Note: The riders on the squad were Alessandro Ballan, Mathias Frank, Taylor Phinney, Marco Pinotti, Yannick Eijssen, Ivan Santaromita, Tim Roe, and Danilo Wyss)	Italy	Arco
April 29	Giro di Toscana	UCI Europe Tour	Alessandro Ballan (ITA)	Italy	Arezzo
May 5	Giro d'Italia, Stage 1	UCI World Tour	Taylor Phinney (USA)	Denmark	Herning
May 27	Giro d'Italia, Stage 21	UCI World Tour	Marco Pinotti (ITA)	Italy	Milan
June 4	Critérium du Dauphiné, Stage 1	UCI World Tour	Cadel Evans (AUS)	France	Saint-Vallier
June 10	Critérium du Dauphiné, Points classification	UCI World Tour	Cadel Evans (AUS)	France	
June 17	Tour de Suisse, Swiss rider classification	UCI World Tour	Mathias Frank (SUI)	Switzerland	
July 7	Tour of Austria, Stage 7	UCI Europe Tour	Marco Pinotti (ITA)	Austria	Podersdorf am See
July 22	Tour de France, Young rider classification	UCI World Tour	Tejay van Garderen (USA)	France	
August 1	Paris–Corrèze, Stage 1	UCI Europe Tour	Adam Blythe (GBR)	France	Sassay
August 11	Tour of Utah, Stage 5	UCI America Tour	Johann Tschopp (SUI)	United States	Snowbird
August 12	Eneco Tour, Stage 7	UCI World Tour	Alessandro Ballan (ITA)	Belgium	Geraardsbergen
August 12	Tour of Utah, Overall	UCI America Tour	Johann Tschopp (SUI)	United States	
August 21	USA Pro Cycling Challenge, Stage 2	UCI America Tour	Tejay van Garderen (USA)	United States	Crested Butte
August 26	Vuelta a España, Stage 9	UCI World Tour	Philippe Gilbert (BEL)	Spain	Barcelona
August 26	USA Pro Cycling Challenge, Stage 7	UCI America Tour	Taylor Phinney (USA)	United States	Denver
August 31	Vuelta a España, Stage 13	UCI World Tour	Steve Cummings (GBR)	Spain	Ferrol
September 7	Vuelta a España, Stage 19	UCI World Tour	Philippe Gilbert (BEL)	Spain	La Lastrilla
October 2	Binche–Tournai–Binche	UCI Europe Tour	Adam Blythe (GBR)	Belgium	Binche
October 13	Tour of Beijing, Stage 5	UCI World Tour	Steve Cummings (GBR)	China	Ping Gu
