= 2008 Tour de Romandie =

2008 UCI ProTour, race 6 of 15
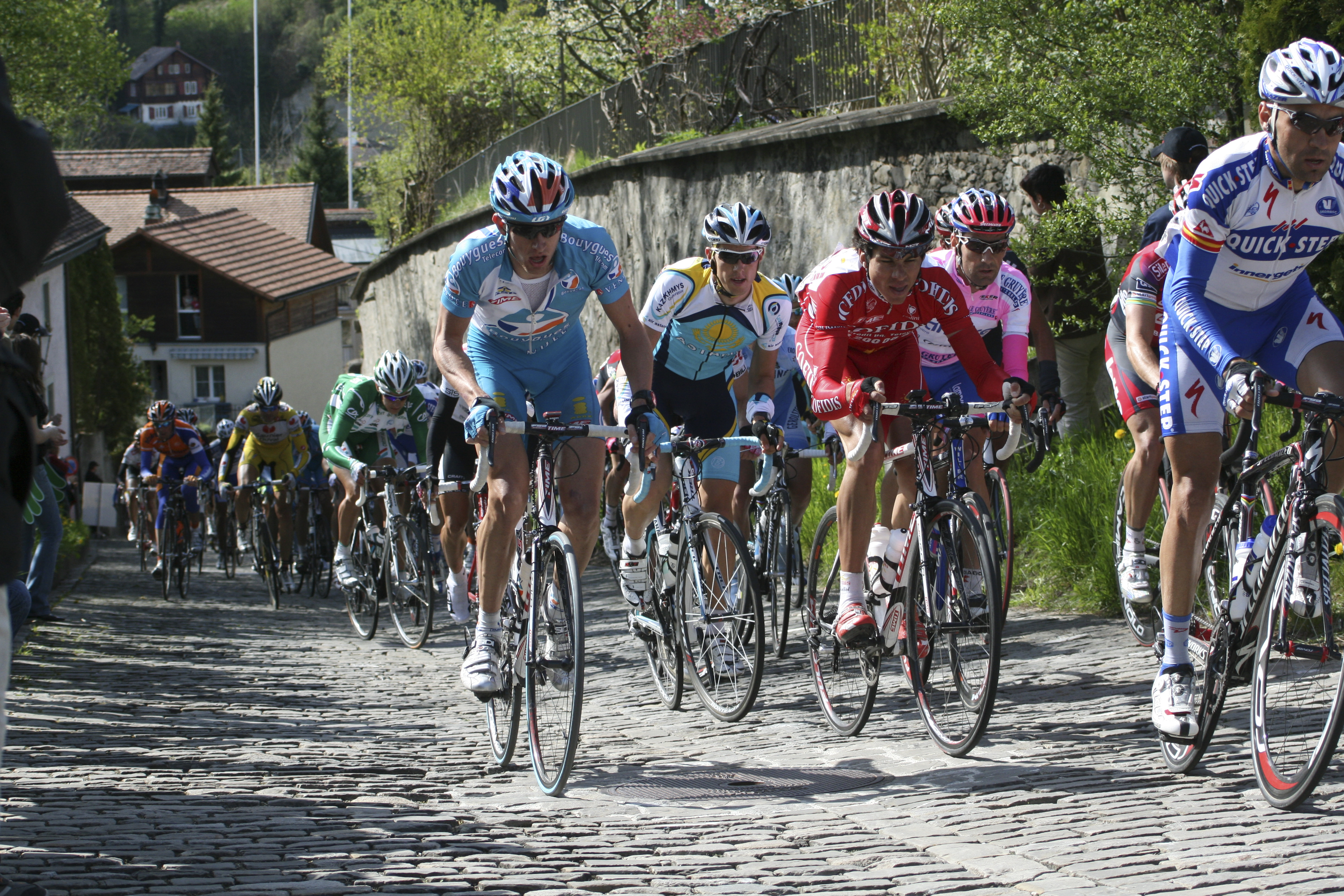

Race details
- Dates: 29 April–4 May 2008
- Stages: 5 & Prologue
- Distance: 659 km (409 mi)
- Winning time: 16h 43' 20"

Results
	Winner	Andreas Klöden (GER)	(Astana)
	Second	Roman Kreuziger (CZE)	(Liquigas)
	Third	Marco Pinotti (ITA)	(Team High Road)
	Points	Daniele Bennati (ITA)	(Liquigas)
	Mountains	Francesco De Bonis (ITA)	(Gerolsteiner)
	Sprints	Morris Possoni (ITA)	(Team High Road)

The 2008 Tour de Romandie was the 62nd edition of the Tour de Romandie cycling road race and the sixth event of the 2008 UCI ProTour. It took place from 29 April to 4 May in Switzerland. It was won by Andreas Klöden of Astana.

== Teams ==
Nineteen teams participated in the race.

- Ag2r–La Mondiale
- Astana
- Bouygues Télécom
- BMC Racing Team
- Caisse d'Epargne
- Cofidis
- Crédit Agricole
- Euskaltel–Euskadi
- Française des Jeux
- Gerolsteiner
- Lampre
- Liquigas
- Quick-Step
- Rabobank
- Saunier Duval–Scott
- Silence–Lotto
- Team CSC
- Team High Road
- Team Milram

== Stages ==
=== Prologue ===
29 April - Geneva, 1.9 kilometres (1.2 mi) (ITT)

Prologue results
Rank	Rider	Team	Time
1	Mark Cavendish (GBR)	Team High Road	2' 07"
2	Daniele Bennati (ITA)	Liquigas	+ 0"
3	Michael Albasini (SUI)	Liquigas	+ 1"
4	Björn Schröder (GER)	Team Milram	+ 1"
5	Bradley Wiggins (GBR)	Team High Road	+ 1"
6	Roman Kreuziger (CZE)	Liquigas	+ 1"
7	Nick Nuyens (BEL)	Cofidis	+ 2"
8	Martin Elmiger (SUI)	Ag2r–La Mondiale	+ 2"
9	Thomas Dekker (NED)	Rabobank	+ 2"
10	Martin Kohler (SUI)	BMC Racing Team	+ 2"

General classification after Prologue
Rank	Rider	Team	Time
1	Mark Cavendish (GBR)	Team High Road	2' 07"
2	Daniele Bennati (ITA)	Liquigas	+ 0"
3	Michael Albasini (SUI)	Liquigas	+ 1"
4	Björn Schröder (GER)	Team Milram	+ 1"
5	Bradley Wiggins (GBR)	Team High Road	+ 1"
6	Roman Kreuziger (CZE)	Liquigas	+ 1"
7	Nick Nuyens (BEL)	Cofidis	+ 2"
8	Martin Elmiger (SUI)	Ag2r–La Mondiale	+ 2"
9	Thomas Dekker (NED)	Rabobank	+ 2"
10	Martin Kohler (SUI)	BMC Racing Team	+ 2"

=== Stage 1 ===
30 April - Morges to Saignelégier, 182.8 kilometres (113.6 mi)

Stage 1 results
Rank	Rider	Team	Time
1	Maxim Iglinskiy (KAZ)	Astana	4h 47' 28"
2	Michael Albasini (SUI)	Liquigas	+ 0"
3	Markus Zberg (SUI)	Gerolsteiner	+ 0"
4	Thomas Dekker (NED)	Rabobank	+ 2"
5	Alexander Efimkin (GER)	Quick-Step	+ 2"
6	Andreas Klöden (GER)	Astana	+ 2"
7	Oliver Zaugg (SUI)	Gerolsteiner	+ 2"
8	Jens Voigt (BEL)	Team CSC	+ 2"
9	Roman Kreuziger (CZE)	Liquigas	+ 2"
10	Bernhard Kohl (AUT)	Gerolsteiner	+ 2"

General classification after stage 1
Rank	Rider	Team	Time
1	Michael Albasini (SUI)	Liquigas	4h 49' 30"
2	Maxim Iglinskiy (KAZ)	Astana	+ 1"
3	Markus Zberg (SUI)	Gerolsteiner	+ 8"
4	Roman Kreuziger (CZE)	Liquigas	+ 8"
5	Thomas Dekker (NED)	Rabobank	+ 9"
6	Óscar Pereiro (ESP)	Caisse d'Epargne	+ 10"
7	Mikel Astarloza (ESP)	Euskaltel–Euskadi	+ 10"
8	Jussi Veikkanen (FIN)	Française des Jeux	+ 10"
9	Andreas Klöden (GER)	Astana	+ 10"
10	Thomas Frei (SUI)	Astana	+ 11"

=== Stage 2 ===
1 May - Moutier to Fribourg, 172.1 kilometres (106.9 mi)

Stage 2 results
Rank	Rider	Team	Time
1	Robbie McEwen (AUS)	Silence–Lotto	4h 16' 16"
2	Daniele Bennati (ITA)	Liquigas	+ 0"
3	Matti Breschel (SUI)	Team CSC	+ 0"
4	Markus Zberg (SUI)	Gerolsteiner	+ 0"
5	Alexandre Botcharov	Crédit Agricole	+ 0"
6	Josep Jufré (ESP)	Saunier Duval–Scott	+ 0"
7	Heinrich Haussler (GER)	Gerolsteiner	+ 0"
8	Daniele Righi (ITA)	Lampre	+ 0"
9	Björn Schröder (GER)	Team Milram	+ 0"
10	Rubén Pérez (ESP)	Euskaltel–Euskadi	+ 0"

General classification after stage 2
Rank	Rider	Team	Time
1	Michael Albasini (SUI)	Liquigas	9h 05' 46"
2	Maxim Iglinskiy (KAZ)	Astana	+ 1"
3	Markus Zberg (SUI)	Gerolsteiner	+ 8"
4	Roman Kreuziger (CZE)	Liquigas	+ 8"
5	Thomas Dekker (NED)	Rabobank	+ 9"
6	Óscar Pereiro (ESP)	Caisse d'Epargne	+ 10"
7	Jussi Veikkanen (FIN)	Française des Jeux	+ 10"
8	Andreas Klöden (GER)	Astana	+ 10"
9	Mikel Astarloza (ESP)	Euskaltel–Euskadi	+ 11"
10	Steve Morabito (SUI)	Astana	+ 11"

=== Stage 3 ===
2 May - Sion to Sion, 18.8 kilometres (11.7 mi) (ITT)

Stage 3 results
Rank	Rider	Team	Time
1	Andreas Klöden (GER)	Astana	25' 32"
2	Thomas Dekker (NED)	Rabobank	+ 6"
3	Stef Clement (FRA)	Bouygues Télécom	+ 20"
4	Tony Martin (GER)	Team High Road	+ 21"
5	Gustav Larsson (SWE)	Team CSC	+ 25"
6	Roman Kreuziger (CZE)	Liquigas	+ 37"
7	Vladimir Gusev	Astana	+ 37"
8	Marco Pinotti (ITA)	Team High Road	+ 39"
9	Denis Menchov	Rabobank	+ 39"
10	Rein Taaramäe (EST)	Cofidis	+ 41"

General classification after stage 3
Rank	Rider	Team	Time
1	Andreas Klöden (GER)	Astana	9h 31' 28"
2	Thomas Dekker (NED)	Rabobank	+ 5"
3	Roman Kreuziger (CZE)	Liquigas	+ 35"
4	Vladimir Gusev	Astana	+ 38"
5	Marco Pinotti (ITA)	Team High Road	+ 43"
6	Rein Taaramäe (EST)	Cofidis	+ 44"
7	Denis Menchov	Rabobank	+ 45"
8	Óscar Pereiro (ESP)	Caisse d'Epargne	+ 46"
9	Mikel Astarloza (ESP)	Euskaltel–Euskadi	+ 54"
10	Maxim Iglinskiy (KAZ)	Astana	+ 55"

=== Stage 4 ===
3 May - Sion to Zinal, 112.4 kilometres (69.8 mi)

A landslide forced the organizers to cancel the third climb of the day, Saint-Luc, and the route was shortened to 112.4 km.

Stage 4 results
Rank	Rider	Team	Time
1	Francesco De Bonis (ITA)	Gerolsteiner	3h 28' 06"
2	John Gadret (FRA)	Ag2r–La Mondiale	+ 3"
3	Manuel Beltrán (ESP)	Liquigas	+ 5"
4	Sandy Casar (FRA)	Française des Jeux	+ 7"
5	Roman Kreuziger (CZE)	Liquigas	+ 7"
6	Andreas Klöden (GER)	Astana	+ 7"
7	Juan Manuel Gárate (ESP)	Quick-Step	+ 7"
8	Marco Pinotti (ITA)	Team High Road	+ 7"
9	Denis Menchov	Rabobank	+ 7"
10	Mikel Astarloza (ESP)	Euskaltel–Euskadi	+ 7"

General classification after stage 4
Rank	Rider	Team	Time
1	Andreas Klöden (GER)	Astana	12h 59' 41"
2	Roman Kreuziger (CZE)	Liquigas	+ 35"
3	Marco Pinotti (ITA)	Team High Road	+ 43"
4	Denis Menchov	Rabobank	+ 45"
5	Mikel Astarloza (ESP)	Euskaltel–Euskadi	+ 54"
6	Sandy Casar (FRA)	Française des Jeux	+ 1' 05"
7	Juan Manuel Gárate (ESP)	Quick-Step	+ 1' 08"
8	John Gadret (FRA)	Ag2r–La Mondiale	+ 1' 14"
9	Maxim Iglinskiy (KAZ)	Astana	+ 1' 52"
10	José Ángel Gómez Marchante (ESP)	Saunier Duval–Scott	+ 1' 52"

=== Stage 5 ===
4 May - Le Bouveret to Lausanne, 159.4 kilometres (99.0 mi)

Stage 5 results
Rank	Rider	Team	Time
1	Daniele Bennati (ITA)	Liquigas	3h 43' 39"
2	Markus Zberg (SUI)	Gerolsteiner	+ 0"
3	Maxim Iglinskiy (KAZ)	Astana	+ 0"
4	Matti Breschel (DEN)	Team CSC	+ 0"
5	Björn Schröder (GER)	Team Milram	+ 0"
6	Mark Cavendish (GBR)	Team High Road	+ 0"
7	Danilo Wyss (SUI)	BMC Racing Team	+ 0"
8	Daniele Righi (ITA)	Lampre	+ 0"
9	Daniel Moreno (ESP)	Caisse d'Epargne	+ 0"
10	Mikel Astarloza (ESP)	Euskaltel–Euskadi	+ 0"

General classification after stage 5
Rank	Rider	Team	Time
1	Andreas Klöden (GER)	Astana	16h 43' 20"
2	Roman Kreuziger (CZE)	Liquigas	+ 35"
3	Marco Pinotti (ITA)	Team High Road	+ 43"
4	Denis Menchov	Rabobank	+ 45"
5	Mikel Astarloza (ESP)	Euskaltel–Euskadi	+ 54"
6	Sandy Casar (FRA)	Française des Jeux	+ 1' 05"
7	Juan Manuel Gárate (ESP)	Quick-Step	+ 1' 08"
8	John Gadret (FRA)	Ag2r–La Mondiale	+ 1' 14"
9	Maxim Iglinskiy (KAZ)	Astana	+ 1' 48"
10	José Ángel Gómez Marchante (ESP)	Saunier Duval–Scott	+ 1' 52"

== Classification standings ==
=== General classification ===
Final general classification (1–10)
Rank	Rider	Team	Time
1	Andreas Klöden (GER)	Astana	16h 43' 20"
2	Roman Kreuziger (CZE)	Liquigas	+ 35"
3	Marco Pinotti (ITA)	Team High Road	+ 43"
4	Denis Menchov	Rabobank	+ 45"
5	Mikel Astarloza (ESP)	Euskaltel–Euskadi	+ 54"
6	Sandy Casar (FRA)	Française des Jeux	+ 1' 05"
7	Juan Manuel Gárate (ESP)	Quick-Step	+ 1' 08"
8	John Gadret (FRA)	Ag2r–La Mondiale	+ 1' 14"
9	Maxim Iglinskiy (KAZ)	Astana	+ 1' 48"
10	José Ángel Gómez Marchante (ESP)	Saunier Duval–Scott	+ 1' 52"

=== Mountains classification ===
Final mountains classification (1–10)
Rank	Rider	Team	Points
1	Francesco De Bonis (ITA)	Gerolsteiner	36
2	Stef Clement (FRA)	Bouygues Télécom	28
3	Rémy Di Gregorio (FRA)	Française des Jeux	21
4	Alexandre Moos (SUI)	BMC Racing Team	20
5	Morris Possoni (ITA)	Team High Road	20
6	Steve Zampieri (SUI)	Cofidis	16
7	Haimar Zubeldia (ESP)	Euskaltel–Euskadi	14
8	Ian McKissick (USA)	BMC Racing Team	14
9	Paolo Tiralongo (ITA)	Lampre	12
10	José Luis Arrieta (ESP)	Ag2r–La Mondiale	11

=== Points classification ===
Final points classification (1–10)
Rank	Rider	Team	Points
1	Daniele Bennati (ITA)	Liquigas	39
2	Markus Zberg (SUI)	Gerolsteiner	37
3	Maxim Iglinskiy (KAZ)	Astana	36
4	Andreas Klöden (GER)	Astana	35
5	Roman Kreuziger (CZE)	Liquigas	32
6	Michael Albasini (SUI)	Liquigas	30
7	Francesco De Bonis (ITA)	Gerolsteiner	25
8	John Gadret (FRA)	Ag2r–La Mondiale	23
9	Mark Cavendish (GBR)	Team High Road	22
10	Björn Schröder (GER)	Team Milram	21

=== Sprints classification ===
Final sprints classification (1–10)
Rank	Rider	Team	Points
1	Morris Possoni (ITA)	Team High Road	12
2	Alexandre Moos (SUI)	BMC Racing Team	12
3	Michael Albasini (SUI)	Liquigas	12
4	Ian McKissick (USA)	BMC Racing Team	12
5	José Luis Arrieta (ESP)	Ag2r–La Mondiale	6
6	Jérôme Coppel (FRA)	Française des Jeux	4
7	Haimar Zubeldia (ESP)	Euskaltel–Euskadi	3
8	Stef Clement (FRA)	Bouygues Télécom	3
9	Mathias Frank (SUI)	Gerolsteiner	3
10	Rémy Di Gregorio (FRA)	Française des Jeux	2

== Individual 2008 UCI ProTour standings after race ==
As of 4 May 2008, after the 2008 Tour de Romandie.

Rank	Name	Team	Points
1	Damiano Cunego (ITA)	Lampre	73
2	André Greipel (GER)	Team High Road	62
3	Alberto Contador (ESP)	Astana	58
4	Thomas Dekker (NED)	Rabobank	54
5	Andreas Klöden (GER)	Astana	53
6	Stijn Devolder (BEL)	Quick-Step	50
7	José Joaquín Rojas (ESP)	Caisse d'Epargne	45
8	Mikel Astarloza (ESP)	Euskaltel–Euskadi	45
9	Cadel Evans (AUS)	Silence–Lotto	42
10	Óscar Freire (ESP)	Rabobank	40
11	Roman Kreuziger (CZE)	Liquigas	40
12	Nick Nuyens (BEL)	Cofidis	40

- 62 riders have scored at least one point on the 2008 UCI ProTour.

== See also ==
- 2008 in road cycling
