= 2008 Tour of California =

UCI America Tour

Race details
- Dates: February 17–24
- Stages: 7 & Prologue
- Distance: 650 mi (1,046 km)
- Winning time: 29h 24' 32"

Results
	Winner	Levi Leipheimer (USA)	(Astana)
	Second	David Millar (GBR)	(Slipstream–Chipotle)
	Third	Christian Vande Velde (USA)	(Slipstream–Chipotle)
	Mountains	Scott Nydam (USA)	(BMC Racing Team)
	Youth	Robert Gesink (NED)	(Rabobank)
	Sprints	Dominique Rollin (CAN)	(Toyota–United)
	Team	(United States) Slipstream–Chipotle	

The 2008 Tour of California was the third edition of the Tour of California, an eight-day, 650-mile (1,045 km) stage race, which began in Palo Alto (Stanford University), then raced through the California redwoods, wine country and the Pacific Coast and finished in Pasadena. The road bicycle racing event was held February 17–24. The 2008 Tour of California is part of the 2007–2008 UCI America Tour and the 2008 USA Cycling Professional Tour.

== Participating teams ==
UCI ProTour Teams

- AST - Astana
- BTL - Bouygues Télécom
- C.A - Crédit Agricole
- CSC - Team CSC
- GST - Gerolsteiner
- QST - Quick-Step
- RAB - Rabobank
- SDV - Saunier Duval–Scott
- THR - Team High Road

UCI Professional Continental Teams

- BMC - BMC Racing Team
- TSL - Slipstream–Chipotle

UCI Continental Teams

- BPC - Bissell
- HNM - Health Net–Maxxis
- JBC - Jelly Belly Cycling Team
- KBM - Kelly Benefit Strategies–Medifast
- RRC - Rock Racing
- TUP - Toyota–United

== Stage Results ==
=== Prologue, February 17, Palo Alto - Stanford University, 3.4 km ===
Prologue Result

	Cyclist	Team	Time
1	Fabian Cancellara (SUI)	Team CSC	3' 51"
2	Bradley Wiggins (GBR)	Team High Road	+ 4"
3	Tyler Farrar (USA)	Slipstream–Chipotle	+ 5"

=== Stage 1, February 18, Sausalito - Santa Rosa, 156 km ===
Stage 1 Result

	Cyclist	Team	Time
1	Juan José Haedo (ARG)	Team CSC	4h 03' 29"
2	Gerald Ciolek (GER)	Team High Road	+ 0"
3	Heinrich Haussler (GER)	Gerolsteiner	+ 0"

General Classification after Stage 1

	Cyclist	Team	Time
1	Fabian Cancellara (SUI)	Team CSC	4h 07' 20"
2	Tyler Farrar (USA)	Slipstream–Chipotle	+ 2"
3	Bradley Wiggins (GBR)	Team High Road	+ 4"

=== Stage 2, February 19, Santa Rosa - Sacramento, 186 km ===
Stage 2 Result

	Cyclist	Team	Time
1	Tom Boonen (BEL)	Quick-Step	5h 09' 35"
2	Heinrich Haussler (GER)	Gerolsteiner	+ 0"
3	Mario Cipollini (ITA)	Rock Racing	+ 0"

General Classification after Stage 2

	Cyclist	Team	Time
1	Tyler Farrar (USA)	Slipstream–Chipotle	9h 16' 54"
2	Fabian Cancellara (SUI)	Team CSC	+ 1"
3	Tom Boonen (BEL)	Quick-Step	+ 4"

=== Stage 3, February 20, Modesto - San José, 165 km ===
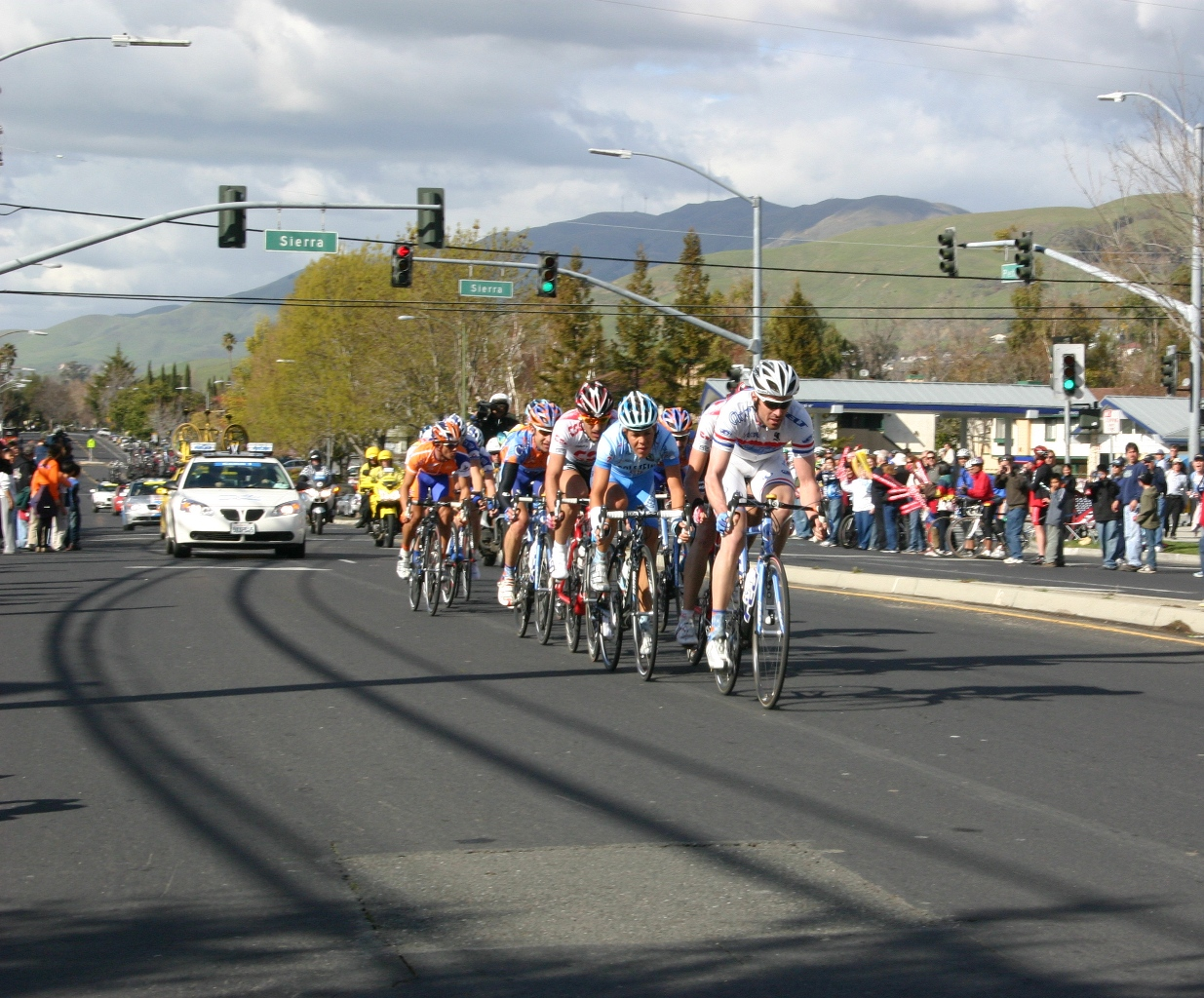
David Millar leading the chase at the end of Stage 3.

Stage 3 Result

	Cyclist	Team	Time
1	Robert Gesink (NED)	Rabobank	4h 28' 29"
2	Levi Leipheimer (USA)	Astana	+ 0"
3	Jurgen Van de Walle (BEL)	Quick-Step	+ 19"

General Classification after Stage 3

	Cyclist	Team	Time
1	Levi Leipheimer (USA)	Astana	13h 45' 30"
2	Fabian Cancellara (SUI)	Team CSC	+ 13"
3	Robert Gesink (NED)	Rabobank	+ 15"

=== Stage 4, February 21, Seaside - San Luis Obispo, 218 km ===
Stage 4 Result

	Cyclist	Team	Time
1	Dominique Rollin (CAN)	Toyota–United	06h 56' 08"
2	George Hincapie (USA)	Team High Road	+ 18"
3	Iker Camaño (ESP)	Saunier Duval–Scott	+ 18"

General Classification after Stage 4

	Cyclist	Team	Time
1	Levi Leipheimer (USA)	Astana	20h 44' 06"
2	Fabian Cancellara (SUI)	Team CSC	+ 13"
3	Robert Gesink (NED)	Rabobank	+ 15"

=== Stage 5, February 22, Solvang, 24 km ===
Stage 5 Result

	Cyclist	Team	Time
1	Levi Leipheimer (USA)	Astana	30' 46"
2	David Millar (GBR)	Slipstream–Chipotle	+ 29"
3	Christian Vande Velde (USA)	Slipstream–Chipotle	+ 45"

General Classification after Stage 5

	Cyclist	Team	Time
1	Levi Leipheimer (USA)	Astana	21h 14' 52"
2	David Millar (GBR)	Slipstream–Chipotle	+ 49"
3	Christian Vande Velde (USA)	Slipstream–Chipotle	+ 1' 08"

=== Stage 6, February 23, Santa Barbara - Santa Clarita, 169.6 km ===
Stage 6 Result

	Cyclist	Team	Time
1	Luciano Pagliarini (BRA)	Saunier Duval–Scott	4h 18' 31"
2	Juan José Haedo (ARG)	Team CSC	+ 0"
3	Paolo Bettini (ITA)	Quick-Step	+ 0"

General Classification after Stage 6

	Cyclist	Team	Time
1	Levi Leipheimer (USA)	Astana	25h 33' 23"
2	David Millar (GBR)	Slipstream–Chipotle	+ 49"
3	Christian Vande Velde (USA)	Slipstream–Chipotle	+ 1' 08"

=== Stage 7, February 24, Santa Clarita - Pasadena, 150 km ===
Stage 7 Result

	Cyclist	Team	Time
1	George Hincapie (USA)	Team High Road	3h 50' 57"
2	Rory Sutherland (AUS)	Health Net Pro Cycling Team	+ 0"
3	Jason McCartney (USA)	Team CSC	+ 0"

General Classification after Stage 7

	Cyclist	Team	Time
1	Levi Leipheimer (USA)	Astana	29h 24' 32"
2	David Millar (GBR)	Slipstream–Chipotle	+ 49"
3	Christian Vande Velde (USA)	Slipstream–Chipotle	+ 1' 08"

== Final standing ==
=== General classification ===
	Cyclist	Team	Time
1	Levi Leipheimer (USA)	Astana	29h 24' 32"
2	David Millar (GBR)	Slipstream–Chipotle	+ 49"
3	Christian Vande Velde (USA)	Slipstream–Chipotle	+ 1' 08"
4	Fabian Cancellara (SUI)	Team CSC	+ 1' 18"
5	Gustav Larsson (SWE)	Team CSC	+ 1' 19"
6	David Zabriskie (USA)	Slipstream–Chipotle	+ 1' 36"
7	Christopher Horner (USA)	Astana	+ 2' 07"
8	Jurgen Van de Walle (BEL)	Quick-Step	+ 2' 11"
9	Robert Gesink (NED)	Rabobank	+2' 18"
10	Alexandre Moos (SUI)	BMC Racing Team	+2' 27"

=== Team classification ===
	Team	Country	Time
1	Slipstream–Chipotle	United States	88h 17' 05"
2	Astana	Luxembourg	+ 16"
3	Team CSC	Denmark	+ 8' 44"

=== Young classification ===
	Cyclist	Team	Time
1	Robert Gesink (NED)	Rabobank	29h 26' 50"
2	Tom Peterson (USA)	Slipstream–Chipotle	+ 40"
3	Kevin Seeldraeyers (BEL)	Quick-Step	+ 1' 22"

=== Mountains classification ===
	Cyclist	Team	Points
1	Scott Nydam (USA)	BMC Racing Team	26
2	Jurgen Van de Walle (BEL)	Quick-Step	19
3	Robert Gesink (NED)	Rabobank	17

=== Sprint classification ===
	Cyclist	Team	Points
1	Dominique Rollin (CAN)	Toyota–United	44
2	Juan José Haedo (ARG)	Team CSC	42
3	Gerald Ciolek (GER)	Team High Road	32

== Jersey progress ==
Stage (Winner)	General Classification	Youth Classification	Mountains Classification	Sprint Classification	Team Classification	Most Aggressive
Prologue (Fabian Cancellara)	Fabian Cancellara	Edvald Boasson Hagen	no award	Fabian Cancellara	Team High Road	no award
Stage 1 (Juan José Haedo)	Fabian Cancellara	Gerald Ciolek	Jackson Stewart	Jackson Stewart	Team High Road	Jackson Stewart
Stage 2 (Tom Boonen)	Tyler Farrar	Gerald Ciolek	Jackson Stewart	Heinrich Haussler	Team High Road	Scott Nydam
Stage 3 (Robert Gesink)	Levi Leipheimer	Robert Gesink	Scott Nydam	Heinrich Haussler	Astana	George Hincapie
Stage 4 (Dominique Rollin)	Levi Leipheimer	Robert Gesink	Scott Nydam	Dominique Rollin	Astana	Dominique Rollin
Stage 5 (Levi Leipheimer)	Levi Leipheimer	Robert Gesink	Scott Nydam	Dominique Rollin	Slipstream–Chipotle	no award
Stage 6 (Luciano Pagliarini)	Levi Leipheimer	Robert Gesink	Scott Nydam	Dominique Rollin	Slipstream–Chipotle	Rory Sutherland
Stage 7 (George Hincapie)	Levi Leipheimer	Robert Gesink	Scott Nydam	Dominique Rollin	Slipstream–Chipotle	BMC Racing Team
Final	Levi Leipheimer	Robert Gesink	Scott Nydam	Dominique Rollin	Slipstream–Chipotle	
