= Francesco De Bonis =

Italian road bicycle racer

Personal information
- Full name: Francesco De Bonis
- Born: 14 April 1982 (age 44) Isola del Liri, Italy

Cycling career
- Sport: Cycling
- Discipline: Road
- Role: Rider
- Rider type: Climber

Professional teams
- 2008: Gerolsteiner
- 2009: Diquigiovanni–Androni

Francesco De Bonis (born 14 April 1982 in Isola del Liri) is an Italian former professional road cyclist. In 2008 he won the fourth stage and the mountains classification of the Tour de Romandie. He also rode in the 2009 Giro d'Italia, finishing 79th overall.

On 27 May 2010, based on discrepancies in his biological passport, De Bonis was suspended for two years by the Italian Olympic Committee after a request from the International Cycling Union.

== Major results ==
2007
1st GP Folignano
1st Trofeo Internazionale Bastianelli
2008
Tour de Romandie

1st Mountains classification
1st Stage 4
