= Scott Nydam =

American cyclist (born 1977)

Personal information
- Born: April 9, 1977 (age 49) United States
- Height: 1.80 m (5 ft 11 in)
- Weight: 71 kg (157 lb)

Cycling career
- Sport: Cycling
- Discipline: Road
- Role: Rider

Amateur team
- 2006: BMC Racing Team

Professional team
- 2007-2010: BMC Racing Team

Scott Nydam (born April 9, 1977 in Denver, Colorado, United States) is an American former professional cyclist. He won the mountains classification at the 2008 Tour of California. He is married to Jennifer Nydam.

== Career ==
Nydam raced for the BMC Racing Team in 2006, its first year, prior to it becoming a professional team in 2007. He continued to race for the team through 2009. However, in 2009 he suffered a concussion during the Tour of the Gila. As his fifth major concussion, this ultimately spelled the end of his professional cycling career. While he was on the 2010 roster for BMC Racing Team he was never cleared to race.

=== After Retirement ===
After retiring he worked for BMC Racing Team first in data collection and later as performance advisor. He worked with the professional team until 2012, before working in the same capacity with the BMC Development Team from 2013 to 2016. He has coached Peter Stetina since 2013, including through his transition from professional road cycling to gravel racing.

Nydam also briefly assisted in coaching Team Rwanda with Jock Boyer and Clark Natwick.

In 2016 Nydam founded Silver Stallion Coffee and Bread, a coffee shop and restaurant in Gallup, New Mexico. After 2 years of running the business he converted to a non-profit model, and pivoted to focus on bikes and coffee. During the COVID-19 pandemic the organization established a Mobile Repair Center to provide bicycle repairs to the community of the Navajo Reservation.

Nydam also serves as the coach of the Dine' Composite high school mountain bike team, and serves on the advisory board of NavajoYES.

== Major results ==
2006
3rd Stage 6 Cascade Cycling Classic
2007
1st Stage 2b (TTT) Giro del Friuli
1st Mountains Classification Cascade Cycling Classic
3rd Stage 3 Tour de 'Toona
2008
1st mountains classification Amgen Tour de California
2nd mountains classification Tour de Wallonie
2nd Nevada City Classic
3rd overall Tour de Nez
2009
1st Tour of the Battenkill
2nd Copperopolis Road Race
