= Florian Stalder =

Swiss cyclist

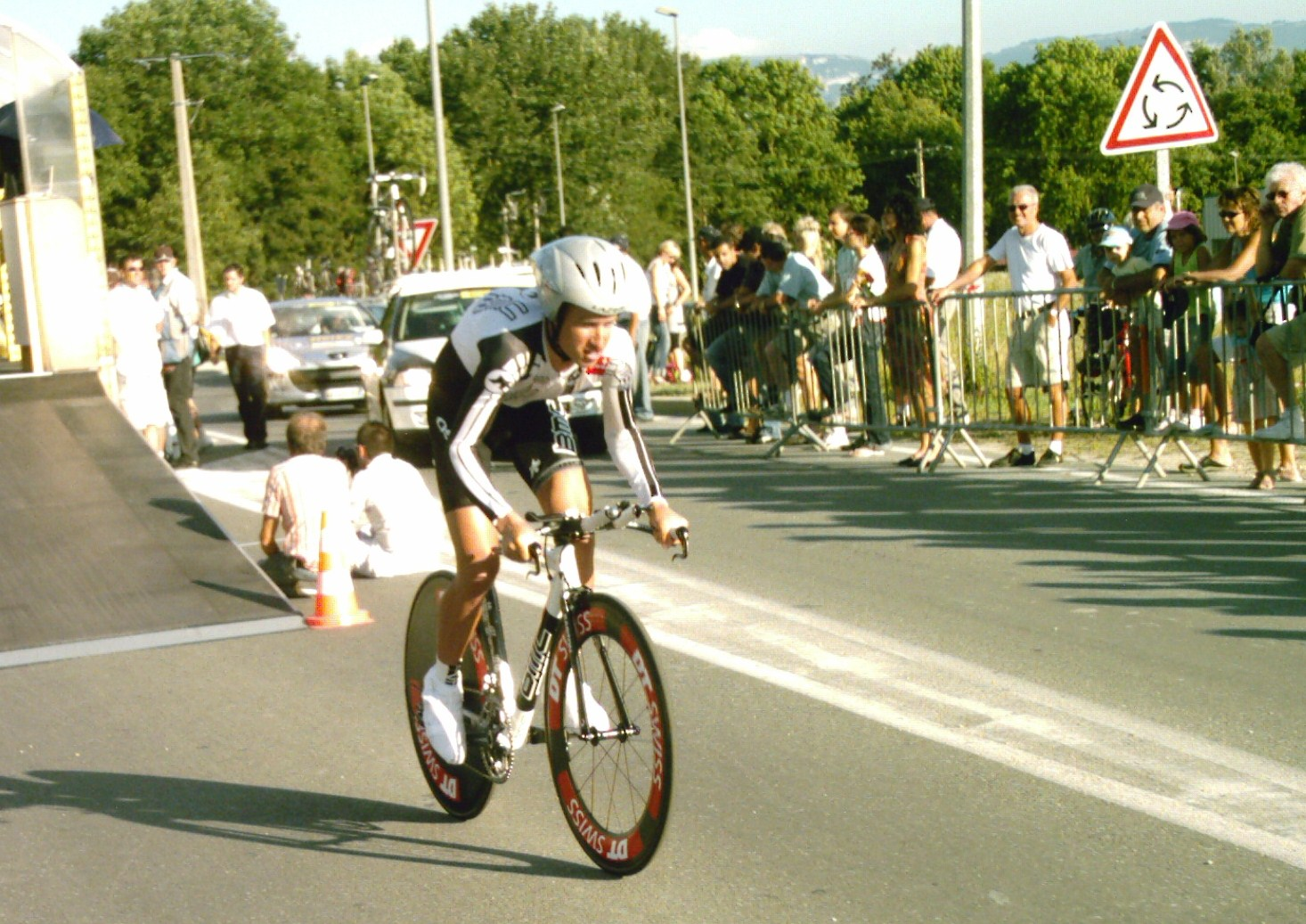

Personal information
- Full name: Florian Stalder
- Born: 13 September 1982 (age 44) Lenk, Switzerland

Cycling career
- Sport: Cycling
- Discipline: Road
- Role: Rider

Professional teams
- 2005: Ed' System ZVVZ
- 2006: Phonak
- 2007–2008: Team Volksbank
- 2009–2010: BMC Racing Team

Florian Stalder (born 13 September 1982 in Lenk) is a Swiss former racing cyclist who last rode for BMC Racing Team.

== Major results ==
2003
3rd Overall GP Tell
5th Giro del Canavese
2004
4th Overall GP Tell
2005
9th Overall Rheinland-Pfalz Rundfahrt
2006
5th Paris–Bourges
2007
2nd Giro del Veneto
4th Rund um die Hainleite
8th Rund um den Henninger Turm
10th Memorial Cimurri - Gran Premio Bioera
2008
6th GP Triberg-Schwarzwald
8th Giro del Mendrisiotto
2009
9th Overall Tour of the Gila
