= Ian McKissick =

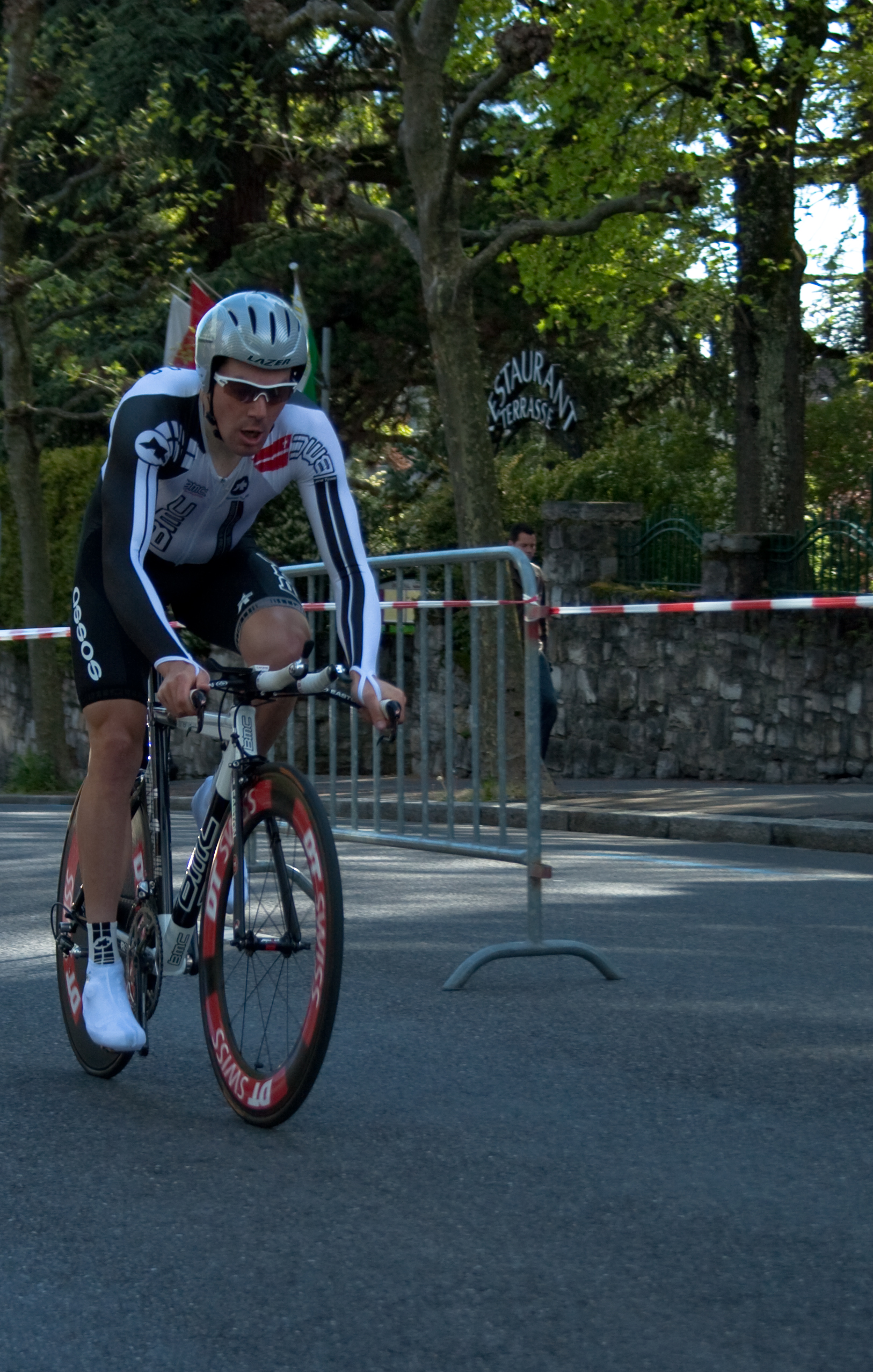
- McKissick during the prologue of the 2009 Tour de Romandie

Personal information
- Born: 20 October 1980 (age 45)

Cycling career
- Sport: Cycling
- Current team: Retired
- Discipline: Road
- Role: Rider

Professional team
- 2007–2009: BMC Racing Team

Ian McKissick (born October 20, 1980) is an American former professional road cyclist.

== Major results ==
2007
1st Stage 2 (TTT) Giro della Friuli Venezia Giulia
2008
1st Stage 2a Tour de Nez
