= Chris Barton (cyclist) =

American cyclist

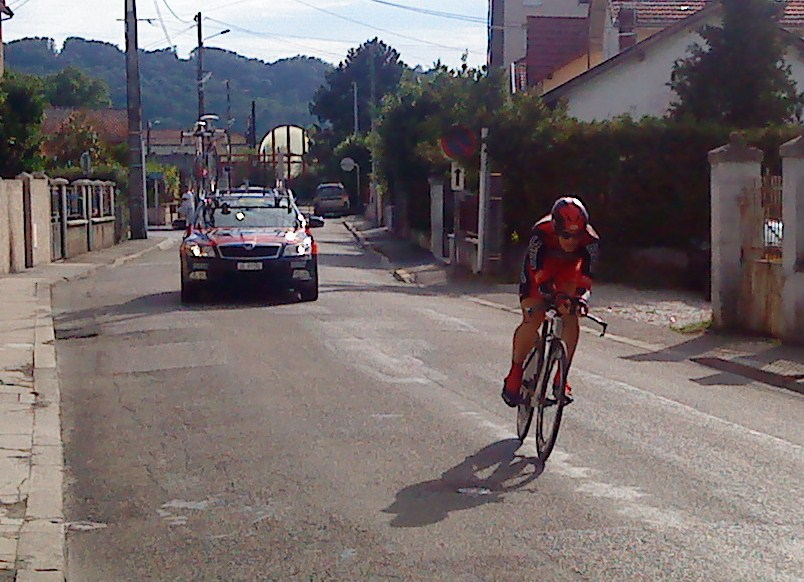

Personal information
- Full name: Christopher Bart Barton
- Born: June 7, 1988 (age 38) Sacramento, California
- Height: 1.88 m (6 ft 2 in)
- Weight: 77 kg (170 lb)

Cycling career
- Sport: Cycling
- Discipline: Road
- Role: Rider

Amateur teams
- 2007: Vendée U
- 2013: CashCall Mortgage
- 2015–2016: KHS–Maxxis–JLVelo
- 2017-2019: Gorbistek

Professional teams
- 2010–2011: BMC Racing Team
- 2012: Bissell

Chris Barton (born June 7, 1988 in Sacramento) is an American former professional road cyclist. He rode in the 2011 Giro d'Italia.

== Major results ==
2008
1st Stage 3 Tour of Belize (TTT)
2009
5th Overall Le Triptyque des Monts et Châteaux
2013
2nd Time trial, National Amateur Road Championships
2015
1st Stage 3 Valley of the Sun Stage Race
