= Michael Schär =

Swiss road cyclist

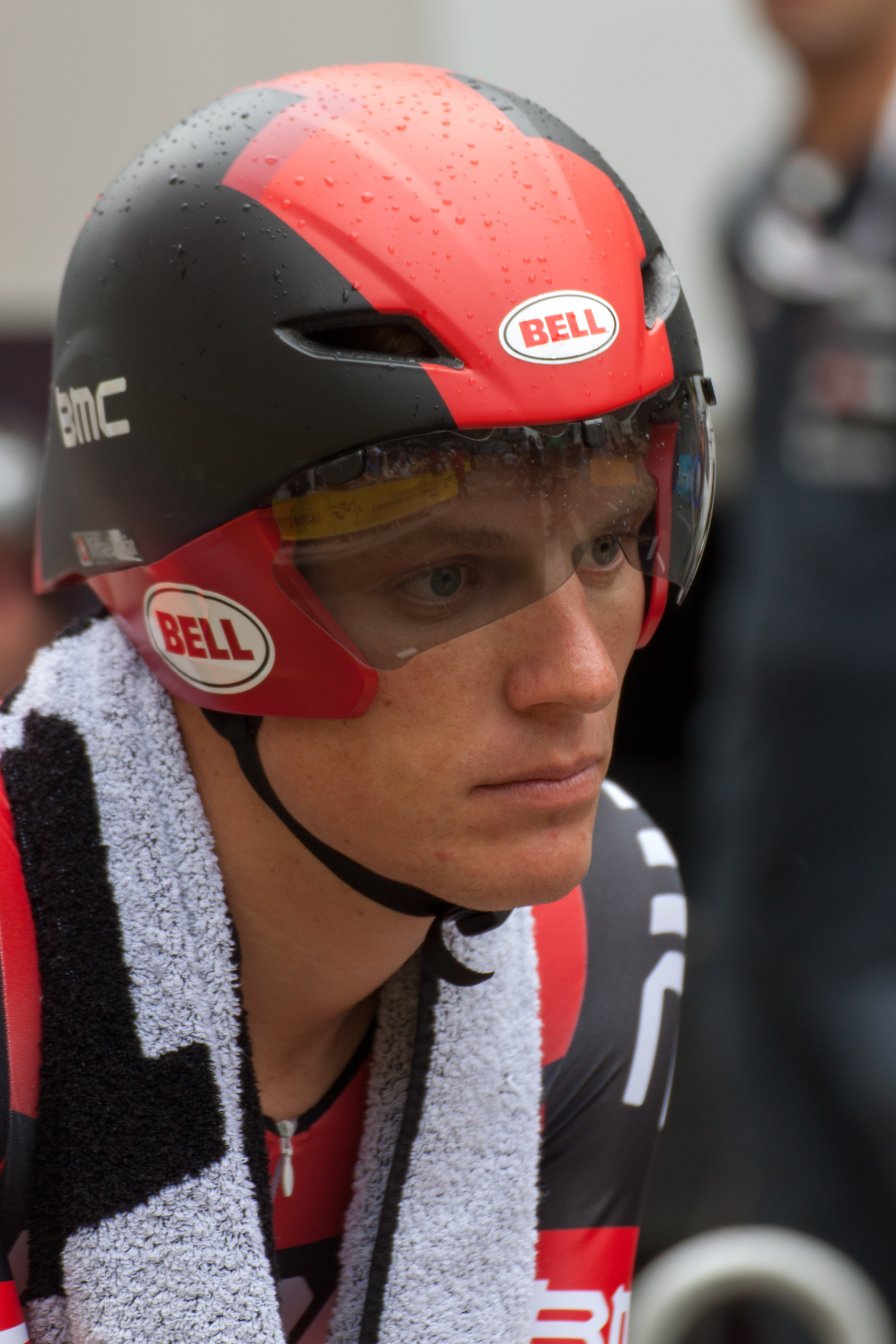
- Schär at the 2012 Critérium du Dauphiné

Personal information
- Full name: Michael Schär
- Born: 29 September 1986 (age 40) Geuensee, Lucerne, Switzerland
- Height: 1.98 m (6 ft 6 in)
- Weight: 78 kg (172 lb; 12 st 4 lb)

Cycling career
- Sport: Cycling
- Current team: Lidl–Trek
- Discipline: Road
- Role: Rider (retired); Directeur sportif
- Rider type: Domestique

Amateur team
- 2006: Hadimec

Professional teams
- 2006: Phonak
- 2007–2009: Astana
- 2010–2020: BMC Racing Team
- 2021–2023: AG2R Citroën Team

Managerial team
- 2024–: Lidl–Trek

Major wins
- Grand Tours Tour de France 2 TTT stages (2015, 2018) One-day races and Classics National Road Race Championships (2013)

Michael Schär (born 29 September 1986) is a Swiss former professional road bicycle racer, who competed as a professional from 2006 to 2023. He now works as a directeur sportif for UCI WorldTeam Lidl–Trek.

Born in Geuensee, Schär has competed in thirteen Grand Tours during his career, and was the winner of the Swiss National Road Race Championships in 2013. He competed at the 2012 Summer Olympics. His father Roland Schär was also an Olympic cyclist.

== Major results ==
2003
2nd Overall GP Général Patton
3rd Road race, National Junior Road Championships
2004
1st Time trial, National Junior Road Championships
4th Time trial, UCI Junior Road World Championships
2005
1st Time trial, National Under-23 Road Championships
9th Giro del Lago Maggiore
2006
1st Time trial, National Under-23 Road Championships
4th Paris–Roubaix Espoirs
5th Road race, UEC European Under-23 Road Championships
7th Overall Mainfranken-Tour
10th Ronde Van Vlaanderen Beloften
2007
3rd Overall Sachsen Tour

1st Young rider classification

2012
9th Kampioenschap van Vlaanderen
2013
1st Road race, National Road Championships
7th Overall Tour of Qatar

1st Stage 2 (TTT)

7th Overall Tour of Utah
2014
1st Stage 2 Tour of Utah
2015
1st Stage 9 (TTT) Tour de France
1st Stage 3 (TTT) Critérium du Dauphiné
2016
2nd Overall Tour des Fjords
10th Overall Tour of Qatar
2017
1st Stage 1 (TTT) Volta a la Comunitat Valenciana
2018
Tour de France

1st Stage 3 (TTT)
Combativity award Stage 13

1st Stage 1 (TTT) Tirreno–Adriatico
1st Stage 1 (TTT) Tour de Suisse
1st Stage 3 (TTT) Volta a la Comunitat Valenciana
3rd Road race, National Road Championships
9th Great War Remembrance Race
2019
Combativity award Stage 4 Tour de France
2020
Combativity award Stage 1 Tour de France
2021
Combativity award Stage 3 Tour de France

=== Grand Tour general classification results timeline ===
Grand Tour	2009	2010	2011	2012	2013	2014	2015	2016	2017	2018	2019	2020	2021
Giro d'Italia	—	99	—	—	—	—	—	—	—	—	—	—	—
Tour de France	—	—	103	49	DNF	43	56	76	72	90	70	69	58
/ Vuelta a España	110	—	—	—	—	—	—	—	—	—	—	—	—

Legend
—	Did not compete
DNF	Did not finish
