= Danilo Wyss =

Swiss road bicycle racer

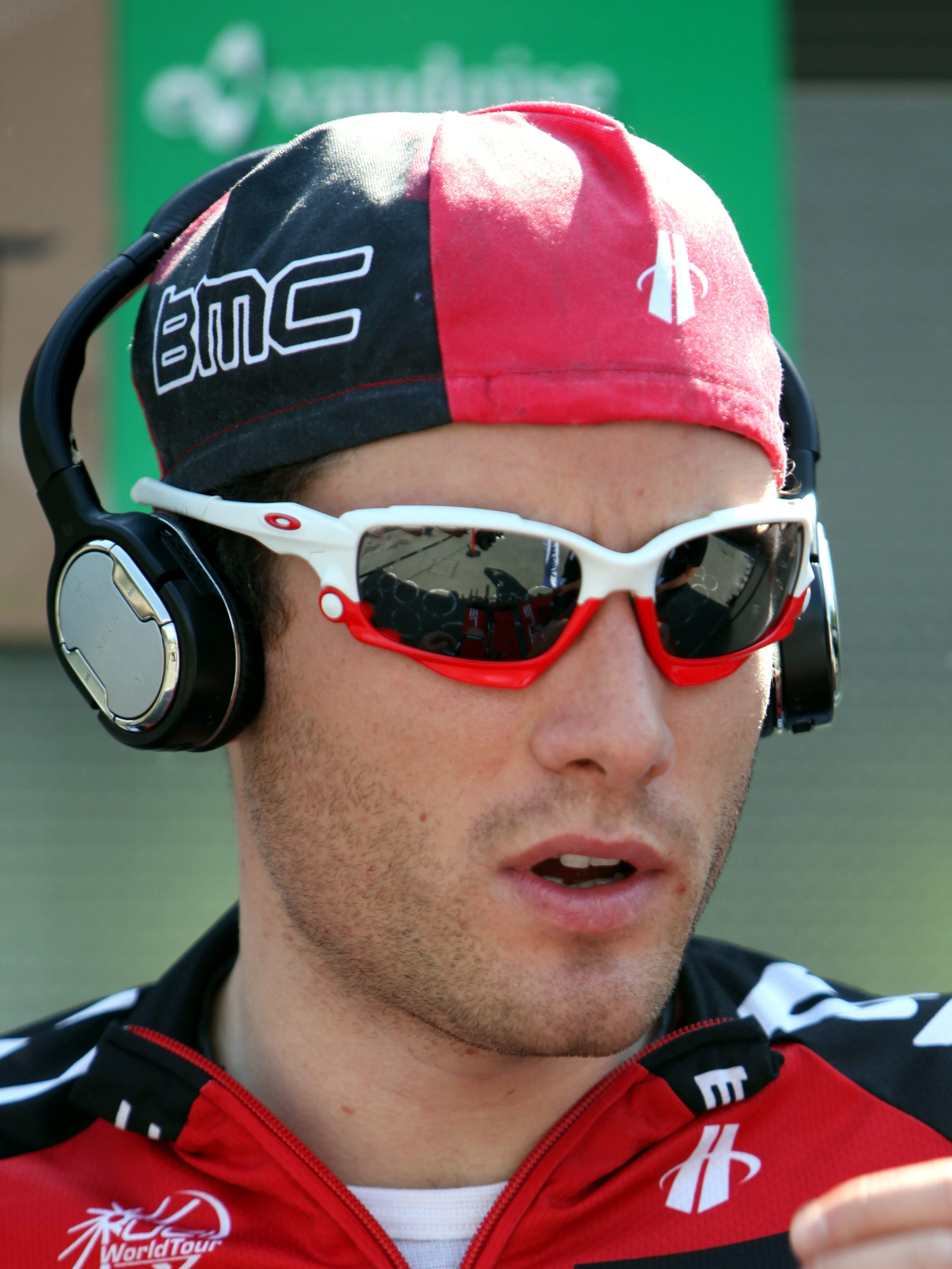
- Wyss at the 2011 Tour de Romandie

Personal information
- Full name: Danilo Wyss
- Born: 26 August 1985 (age 41) Orbe, Switzerland
- Height: 1.76 m (5 ft 9 1/2 in)
- Weight: 65 kg (143 lb)

Cycling career
- Sport: Cycling
- Current team: Retired
- Discipline: Road
- Role: Rider
- Rider type: Sprinter; Classics rider

Amateur teams
- 2007: Atlas–Romer's Hausbäckerei
- 2007: Saunier Duval–Prodir (stagiaire)

Professional teams
- 2008–2018: BMC Racing Team
- 2019–2020: Team Dimension Data

Major wins
- Grand Tours Tour de France 1 TTT stage (2015) One-day races and Classics National Road Race Championships (2015)

Danilo Wyss (born 26 August 1985) is a Swiss former road racing cyclist, who rode professionally between 2008 and 2020 for the BMC Racing Team and NTT Pro Cycling. He is no relation to fellow Swiss cyclist Daniel Wyss who won the Race Across America in 2006 and 2009.

== Career ==
He competed in twelve Grand Tours during his career, finishing each one, including the Giro d'Italia for five successive years between 2010 and 2014. He won the Swiss National Road Race Championships in 2015. He was named in the start list for the 2015 Tour de France.

== Major results ==
2003
2nd Road race, National Junior Road Championships
2006
10th Road race, UCI Under-23 Road World Championships
2007
1st Stage 3 Les 3 Jours de Vaucluse
2nd Grand Prix de Waregem
3rd Paris–Roubaix Espoirs
5th Road race, UCI Under-23 Road World Championships
9th GP Herning
2008
6th Grand Prix Pino Cerami
2009
1st Stage 1 Tour de Beauce
2010
9th Nokere Koerse
2012
1st Stage 1 (TTT) Giro del Trentino
2013
7th Grand Prix Impanis-Van Petegem
10th Overall Ster ZLM Toer
10th Trofeo Laigueglia
2015
1st Road race, National Road Championships
1st Stage 9 (TTT) Tour de France
8th Cadel Evans Great Ocean Road Race
10th Grand Prix of Aargau Canton
2017
9th Japan Cup
2018
4th Overall Arctic Race of Norway
2020
2nd Road race, National Road Championships

=== Grand Tour general classification results timeline ===
Grand Tour	2010	2011	2012	2013	2014	2015	2016	2017	2018	2019	2020
Giro d'Italia	97	126	82	84	84	—	—	—	—	83	84
Tour de France	—	—	—	—	—	63	—	81	—	—	—
Vuelta a España	—	—	—	72	36	—	44	—	—	—	—

Legend
—	Did not compete
DNF	Did not finish
