= CCC Pro Team =

Bicycle racing team

Team information
- UCI code: BMC (2007–2018); CCC (May 2019–2020)
- Registered: United States (2007–2018); Poland (2019–2020)
- Founded: 2007
- Disbanded: 2020
- Discipline: Road
- Status: UCI WorldTeam
- Bicycles: Giant
- Components: Shimano
- Website: Team home page

Key personnel
- General manager: Jim Ochowicz

Team name history
- 2007–2018 2019–2020: BMC Racing Team; CCC Team

CCC Pro Team (UCI team code: CCC) was a UCI WorldTeam co-owned and managed by American cyclist Jim Ochowicz, who founded the 7-Eleven Cycling Team. After its last title sponsor, CCC, a Polish shoe retailer, pulled out due to financial difficulties resulting from the COVID-19 pandemic, Ochowicz was unable to find another major sponsor, so the team disbanded at the end of the 2020 season. In its place, Belgian UCI ProTeam Circus–Wanty Gobert took over the team's license and was promoted to a UCI WorldTeam.

== Ownership ==
The team was owned by Swiss businessman Andy Rihs until his death. After his death the team passed to Jim Ochowicz and Gavin Chilcott.

== History ==
The team was founded as BMC Racing Team in 2007, sponsored by the bicycle manufacturer BMC Switzerland. The team signed a number of major international riders for the 2010 season, including 2009 World Champion, two-time Tour de France runner-up and 2011 winner Cadel Evans, 2009 U.S. Road Race Champion George Hincapie, 2008 World Champion Alessandro Ballan and Spring Classics specialists Karsten Kroon and Marcus Burghardt.

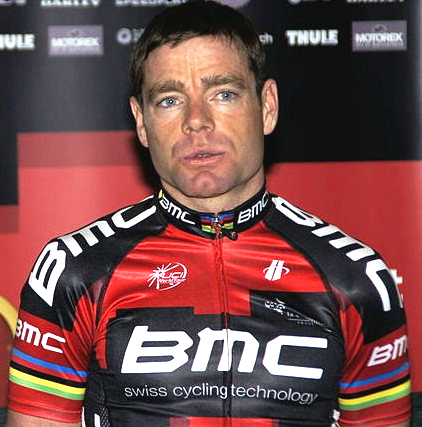
Cadel Evans in his BMC jersey in 2011, the year he won the Tour de France.

In 2010, the team participated in their first Grand Tours, having been invited to compete in the 2010 Tour de France and the 2010 Giro d'Italia. In 2011, the team attained UCI ProTeam status, the most prestigious classification available, and BMC rider Cadel Evans won the 2011 Tour de France. For 2012 the team signed Thor Hushovd and Philippe Gilbert, the 2010 and 2012 world-champions respectively.

In 2012, Evans was unable to defend his title at the Tour de France, finishing in seventh overall, two places behind teammate Tejay van Garderen.

Cadel Evans placed third overall at the 2013 Giro d'Italia.

At the 2013 Tour de France, Cadel Evans finished 39th, Tejay van Garderen 45th, with Steve Morabito the highest placed overall at 35th. Shortly after the end of the Tour, it was announced that John Lelangue, who had been directeur sportif since the team was founded in 2007, was leaving the team "for personal reasons". In September 2013 Jim Ochowicz announced the appointment of Valerio Piva as Lelangue's replacement.

For the 2015 season, BMC signed Alessandro De Marchi, Damiano Caruso and Jempy Drucker. The team also announced they had signed Rohan Dennis – his transfer however was effective immediately. Van Avermaet finished 8th in the World Tour individual classification. Meanwhile, the team won the Team Time Trial World Championship.

For the 2016 season, the team signed Richie Porte. He scored podiums at the Tour Down Under and Paris–Nice to finish 7th in the World Tour individual classification, whereas Van Avermaet finished 6th overall after winning the Tirreno–Adriatico and GP de Montréal.

In the 2017 season, Van Avermaet won the Omloop Het Nieuwsblad, E3 Harelbeke, Gent–Wevelgem and the Paris–Roubaix, therefore he claimed the first place at the World Tour individual classification. Porte finished 12th overall, having won the Tour Down Under and Tour de Romandie. BMC ranked third in the World Tour points classification.

In the 2018 season, Porte won the Tour de Suisse.

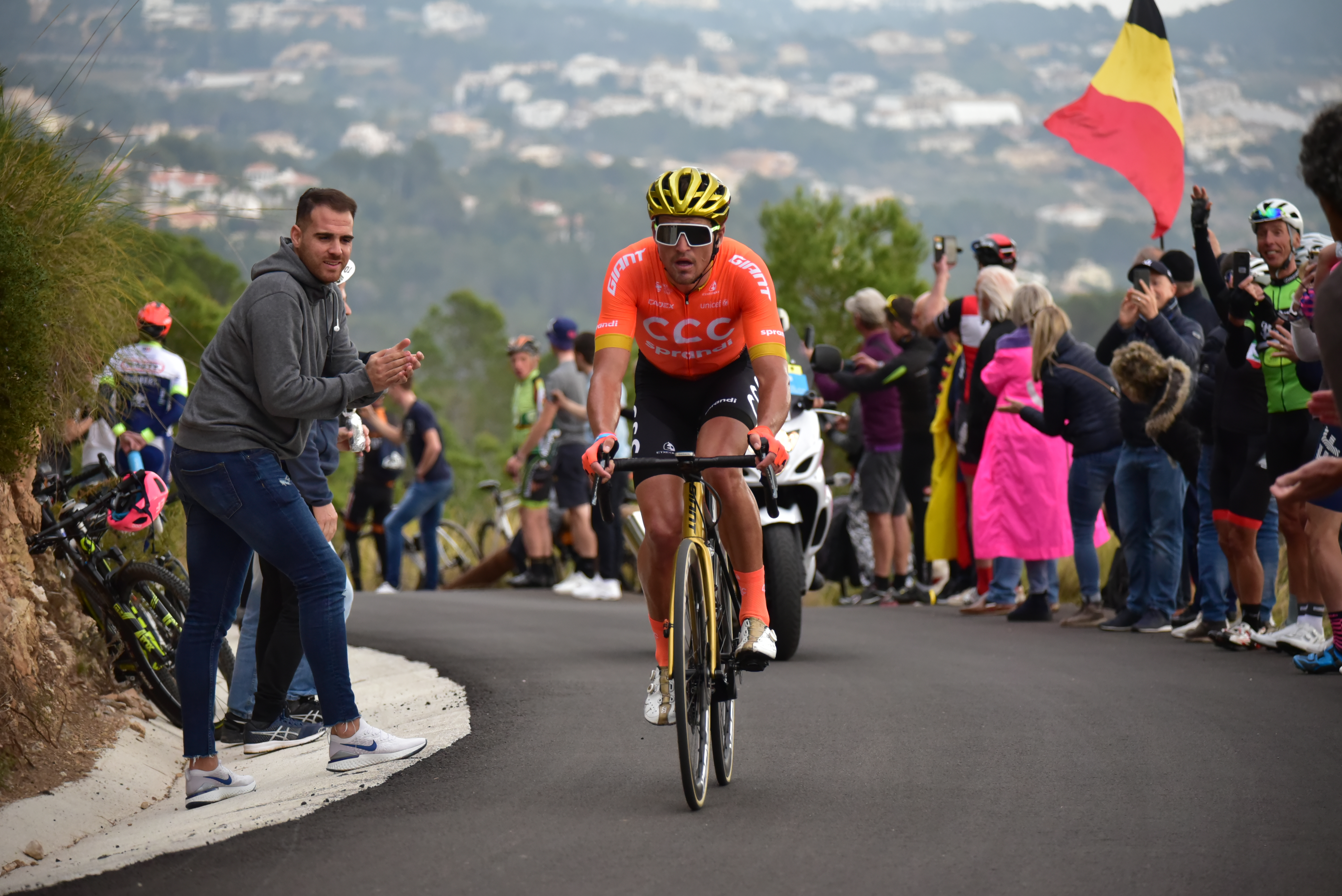
Greg van Avermaet in CCC jersey during the 2020 Volta a la Comunitat Valenciana

In July 2018, the team announced that CCC would become the new title sponsor of the Continuum Sports-owned team, a move that would expand CCC's presence in cycling, with CCC's Professional Continental team, CCC Sprandi Polkowice, stepping down to the Continental level for the 2019 season as CCC Development Team. Van Avermaet will continue as leader, whereas Porte is expected to leave the team.

In September 2020 CCC Team agreed to sell their WorldTour licence to Belgian ProTeam Circus-Wanty Gobert.

== Doping ==
In April 2010, Thomas Frei tested positive for erythropoietin (EPO), Frei was immediately withdrawn from racing by the team. Frei was later sacked by the team.

In August 2017, the UCI confirmed that Samuel Sánchez had returned a positive out of competition drug test for GHRP-2 (Pralmorelin). He was immediately suspended by the team pending analysis of his B-sample.

In February 2019, Kronen Zeitung broke news that a number of professional cyclists had been implicated in the doping scandal uncovered at the 2019 FIS Nordic World Ski Championships. Later, Stefan Denifl confessed to blood doping in a police interview. Denifl had been due to join CCC Team in 2019 but his contract was terminated at Denifl's request in December 2018. CCC Team general manager Jim Ochowicz confirmed that the team's medical assessment of Denifl's biological passport showed no warning signs of blood doping.

== Final team roster ==
As of August 19, 2020.

Rider	Date of birth
Will Barta (USA)	January 4, 1996 (aged 24)
Patrick Bevin (NZL)	February 15, 1991 (aged 29)
Josef Černý (CZE)	May 11, 1993 (aged 27)
Víctor de la Parte (ESP)	June 22, 1986 (aged 34)
Alessandro De Marchi (ITA)	May 19, 1986 (aged 34)
Simon Geschke (GER)	March 13, 1986 (aged 34)
Kamil Gradek (POL)	September 17, 1990 (aged 30)
Jan Hirt (CZE)	January 21, 1991 (aged 29)
Jonas Koch (GER)	June 25, 1993 (aged 27)
Pavel Kochetkov (RUS)	March 7, 1986 (aged 34)
Kamil Małecki (POL)	January 2, 1996 (aged 24)
Jakub Mareczko (ITA)	April 30, 1994 (aged 26)
Michał Paluta (POL)	October 4, 1995 (aged 25)
Serge Pauwels (BEL)	November 21, 1983 (aged 37)

Rider	Date of birth
Joey Rosskopf (USA)	September 5, 1989 (aged 31)
Szymon Sajnok (POL)	August 24, 1997 (aged 23)
Michael Schär (SUI)	September 29, 1986 (aged 34)
Matteo Trentin (ITA)	August 2, 1989 (aged 31)
Attila Valter (HUN)	June 12, 1998 (aged 22)
Greg Van Avermaet (BEL)	May 17, 1985 (aged 35)
Gijs Van Hoecke (BEL)	November 12, 1991 (aged 29)
Nathan Van Hooydonck (BEL)	October 12, 1995 (aged 25)
Guillaume Van Keirsbulck (BEL)	February 14, 1991 (aged 29)
Francisco Ventoso (ESP)	May 6, 1982 (aged 38)
Łukasz Wiśniowski (POL)	December 7, 1991 (aged 29)
Ilnur Zakarin (RUS)	September 15, 1989 (aged 31)
Georg Zimmermann (GER)	October 11, 1997 (aged 23)

== National and world champions ==
2011
Norway Road Race, Alexander Kristoff
Switzerland Time Trial, Martin Kohler
2012
Switzerland Road Race, Martin Kohler
World Road Race, Philippe Gilbert
2013
Italian Road Race, Ivan Santaromita
Italian Time Trial, Marco Pinotti
Switzerland Road Race, Michael Schär
Norway Road Race, Thor Hushovd
2014
USA Time Trial, Taylor Phinney
Slovakia Time Trial, Peter Velits
2015
World Track (Individual pursuit), Stefan Küng
Switzerland Time Trial, Silvan Dillier
Switzerland Road Race, Danilo Wyss
Switzerland Track (Individual pursuit), Stefan Küng
Switzerland Track (Points race), Stefan Küng
2016
Australian Time Trial, Rohan Dennis
USA Time Trial, Taylor Phinney
Italian Time Trial, Manuel Quinziato
Belgium Road Race Championships, Philippe Gilbert
2017
Australian Time Trial, Rohan Dennis
Australian Road Race, Miles Scotson
Luxembourg Time Trial, Jempy Drucker
Switzerland Time Trial, Stefan Küng
USA Time Trial, Joey Rosskopf
Switzerland Road Race, Silvan Dillier
2018
Australian Time Trial, Rohan Dennis
USA Time Trial, Joey Rosskopf
Switzerland Time Trial, Stefan Küng
World Time Trial, Rohan Dennis
2019
New Zealand Time Trial, Patrick Bevin
Poland Road Race, Michal Paluta
2020
Czech Republic Time Trial, Josef Černý
Poland Time Trial, Kamil Gradek

== Sponsors ==
In 2019, besides CCC, notable sponsors include Giant, and Etxeondo.
