= 2023 Danmark Rundt =

2023 UCI ProSeries

Race details
- Dates: 15–19 August 2023
- Stages: 5
- Distance: 729.6 km (453.4 mi)
- Winning time: 16h 49' 16"

Results
Jersey awarded to the overall winner	Winner	Mads Pedersen (DEN)	(Lidl–Trek)
	Second	Mattias Skjelmose (DEN)	(Lidl–Trek)
	Third	Magnus Cort (DEN)	(EF Education–EasyPost)
Jersey awarded to the points classification winner	Points	Mads Pedersen (DEN)	(Lidl–Trek)
Jersey awarded to the mountains classification winner	Mountains	Nicklas Amdi Pedersen (DEN)	(Team ColoQuick)
Jersey awarded to the young rider classification winner	Young rider	Logan Currie (NZL)	(Bolton Equities Black Spoke)
Jersey awarded to the combativity classification winner	Combativity	Mads Østergaard Kristensen (DEN)	(Leopard TOGT Pro Cycling)
	Team	(United States) Lidl–Trek	

The 2023 Danmark Rundt (officially PostNord Danmark Rundt 2023 for sponsorship reasons) was a men's road bicycle race which was held from 15 to 19 August 2023. It is the 32nd edition of Danmark Rundt, which was rated as a 2.Pro event on the 2023 UCI ProSeries calendar.

== Teams ==
Five UCI WorldTeams, nine UCI ProTeams, five UCI Continental teams and the Danish national team made up the twenty teams that participated in the race.

UCI WorldTeams

- Alpecin–Deceuninck
- EF Education–EasyPost
- Lidl–Trek
- Soudal–Quick-Step
- Team dsm–firmenich

UCI ProTeams

- Bolton Equities Black Spoke
- Green Project–Bardiani–CSF–Faizanè
- Human Powered Health
- Lotto–Dstny
- Q36.5 Pro Cycling Team
- Team Flanders–Baloise
- Team Novo Nordisk
- Tudor Pro Cycling Team
- Uno-X Pro Cycling Team

UCI Continental Teams

- BHS–PL Beton Bornholm
- Team ColoQuick
- HRE Mazowsze Serce Polski
- Leopard TOGT Pro Cycling
- Restaurant Suri–Carl Ras

National Teams

- Team PostNord Landsholdet

== Schedule ==
Stage characteristics and winners
Stage	Date	Route	Distance	Type	Stage winner
1	15 August	Aalborg	169.9 km (105.6 mi)	Flat stage	Søren Wærenskjold (NOR)
2	16 August	Kjellerup to Silkeborg	163.6 km (101.7 mi)	Flat stage	Fabio Jakobsen (NED)
3	17 August	Vejen to Vejle	209 km (130 mi)	Hilly stage	Mattias Skjelmose (DEN)
4	18 August	Kalundborg to Bagsværd	171 km (106 mi)	Flat stage	Fabio Jakobsen (NED)
5	19 August	Helsingør	16.1 km (10.0 mi)	Individual time trial	Mads Pedersen (DEN)
Total			729.6 km (453.4 mi)		

== Stages ==
=== Stage 1 ===
15 August 2023 – Aalborg, 169.9 km (105.6 mi)

Stage 1 Result
Rank	Rider	Team	Time
1	Søren Wærenskjold (NOR)	Uno-X Pro Cycling Team	4h 59' 20"
2	Fabio Jakobsen (NED)	Soudal–Quick-Step	+ 0"
3	Mads Pedersen (DEN)	Lidl–Trek	+ 0"
4	Tobias Lund Andresen (DEN)	Team dsm–firmenich	+ 0"
5	Vito Braet (BEL)	Bingoal WB	+ 0"
6	Søren Kragh Andersen (DEN)	Alpecin–Deceuninck	+ 0"
7	Sebastian Kolze Changizi (DEN)	Tudor Pro Cycling Team	+ 0"
8	Sebastian Nielsen (DEN)	Team ColoQuick	+ 0"
9	Andreas Stokbro (DEN)	Leopard TOGT Pro Cycling	+ 0"
10	Luca Colnaghi (ITA)	Green Project–Bardiani–CSF–Faizanè	+ 0"

General classification after Stage 1
Rank	Rider	Team	Time
1	Søren Wærenskjold (NOR)	Uno-X Pro Cycling Team	3h 50' 00"
2	Fabio Jakobsen (NED)	Soudal–Quick-Step	+ 10"
3	Mads Pedersen (DEN)	Lidl–Trek	+ 12"
4	Filippo Ridolfo (ITA)	Team Novo Nordisk	+ 14"
5	Tobias Lund Andresen (DEN)	Team dsm–firmenich	+ 16"
6	Vito Braet (BEL)	Bingoal WB	+ 16"
7	Søren Kragh Andersen (DEN)	Alpecin–Deceuninck	+ 16"
8	Sebastian Kolze Changizi (DEN)	Tudor Pro Cycling Team	+ 16"
9	Sebastian Nielsen (DEN)	Team ColoQuick	+ 16"
10	Andreas Stokbro (DEN)	Leopard TOGT Pro Cycling	+ 16"

=== Stage 2 ===
16 August 2023 – Kjellerup to Silkeborg, 163.6 km (101.7 mi)

Stage 2 Result
Rank	Rider	Team	Time
1	Fabio Jakobsen (NED)	Soudal–Quick-Step	3h 41' 09"
2	Søren Wærenskjold (NOR)	Uno-X Pro Cycling Team	+ 0"
3	Søren Kragh Andersen (DEN)	Alpecin–Deceuninck	+ 0"
4	Tobias Lund Andresen (DEN)	Team dsm–firmenich	+ 0"
5	Mads Pedersen (DEN)	Lidl–Trek	+ 0"
6	Mattias Skjelmose (DEN)	Lidl–Trek	+ 0"
7	Magnus Cort (DEN)	EF Education–EasyPost	+ 0"
8	Jensen Plowright (AUS)	Team ColoQuick	+ 0"
9	Matyáš Kopecký (CZE)	Team Novo Nordisk	+ 0"
10	Filippo Magli (ITA)	Green Project–Bardiani–CSF–Faizanè	+ 0"

General classification after Stage 2
Rank	Rider	Team	Time
1	Søren Wærenskjold (NOR)	Uno-X Pro Cycling Team	7h 31' 03"
2	Fabio Jakobsen (NED)	Soudal–Quick-Step	+ 6"
3	Mads Pedersen (DEN)	Lidl–Trek	+ 18"
4	Søren Kragh Andersen (DEN)	Alpecin–Deceuninck	+ 18"
5	Filippo Ridolfo (ITA)	Team Novo Nordisk	+ 20"
6	Tobias Lund Andresen (DEN)	Team dsm–firmenich	+ 22"
7	Vito Braet (BEL)	Bingoal WB	+ 22"
8	Sebastian Kolze Changizi (DEN)	Tudor Pro Cycling Team	+ 22"
9	Matyáš Kopecký (CZE)	Team Novo Nordisk	+ 22"
10	Sebastian Nielsen (DEN)	Team ColoQuick	+ 22"

=== Stage 3 ===
17 August 2023 – Vejen to Vejle, 209.0 km (129.9 mi)

Stage 3 Result
Rank	Rider	Team	Time
1	Mattias Skjelmose (DEN)	Lidl–Trek	4h 59' 31"
2	Mads Pedersen (DEN)	Lidl–Trek	+ 10"
3	Magnus Cort (DEN)	EF Education–EasyPost	+ 43"
4	Nicola Conci (ITA)	Alpecin–Deceuninck	+ 46"
5	Florian Vermeersch (BEL)	Lotto–Dstny	+ 49"
6	Alexander Kamp (DEN)	Tudor Pro Cycling Team	+ 51"
7	Toms Skujiņš (LAT)	Lidl–Trek	+ 1' 10"
8	Tobias Svarre (DEN)	Team ColoQuick	+ 1' 10"
9	Michael Valgren (DEN)	EF Education–EasyPost	+ 1' 15"
10	Kristian Sbaragli (ITA)	Alpecin–Deceuninck	+ 1' 15"

General classification after Stage 3
Rank	Rider	Team	Time
1	Mattias Skjelmose (DEN)	Lidl–Trek	12h 30' 46"
2	Mads Pedersen (DEN)	Lidl–Trek	+ 10"
3	Magnus Cort (DEN)	EF Education–EasyPost	+ 49"
4	Nicola Conci (ITA)	Alpecin–Deceuninck	+ 56"
5	Florian Vermeersch (BEL)	Lotto–Dstny	+ 59"
6	Alexander Kamp (DEN)	Tudor Pro Cycling Team	+ 1' 01"
7	Søren Wærenskjold (NOR)	Uno-X Pro Cycling Team	+ 1' 09"
8	Toms Skujiņš (LAT)	Lidl–Trek	+ 1' 20"
9	Kristian Sbaragli (ITA)	Alpecin–Deceuninck	+ 1' 25"
10	Brent Van Moer (BEL)	Lotto–Dstny	+ 1' 26"

=== Stage 4 ===
18 August 2023 – Kalundborg to Bagsværd, 171 km (106 mi)

Stage 4 Result
Rank	Rider	Team	Time
1	Fabio Jakobsen (NED)	Soudal–Quick-Step	4h 00' 38"
2	Mads Pedersen (DEN)	Lidl–Trek	+ 0"
3	Luca Colnaghi (ITA)	Green Project–Bardiani–CSF–Faizanè	+ 0"
4	Søren Wærenskjold (NOR)	Uno-X Pro Cycling Team	+ 0"
5	Jensen Plowright (AUS)	Alpecin–Deceuninck	+ 0"
6	Alexander Salby (DEN)	Team PostNord Landsholdet	+ 0"
7	Tobias Lund Andresen (DEN)	Team dsm–firmenich	+ 0"
8	Matteo Moschetti (ITA)	Q36.5 Pro Cycling Team	+ 0"
9	Andrea Peron (ITA)	Team Novo Nordisk	+ 0"
10	Sebastian Nielsen (DEN)	Team ColoQuick	+ 0"

General classification after Stage 4
Rank	Rider	Team	Time
1	Mattias Skjelmose (DEN)	Lidl–Trek	16h 31' 24"
2	Mads Pedersen (DEN)	Lidl–Trek	+ 4"
3	Magnus Cort (DEN)	EF Education–EasyPost	+ 49"
4	Nicola Conci (ITA)	Alpecin–Deceuninck	+ 1' 04"
5	Florian Vermeersch (BEL)	Lotto–Dstny	+ 1' 07"
6	Søren Wærenskjold (NOR)	Uno-X Pro Cycling Team	+ 1' 09"
7	Alexander Kamp (DEN)	Tudor Pro Cycling Team	+ 1' 14"
8	Brent Van Moer (BEL)	Lotto–Dstny	+ 1' 26"
9	Vito Braet (BEL)	Team Flanders–Baloise	+ 1' 31"
10	Magnus Bak Klaris (DEN)	Restaurant Suri–Carl Ras	+ 1' 31"

=== Stage 5 ===
19 August 2023 – Helsingør, 16.1 km (10.0 mi) (ITT)

Stage 5 Result
Rank	Rider	Team	Time
1	Mads Pedersen (DEN)	Lidl–Trek	17' 50"
2	Søren Wærenskjold (NOR)	Uno-X Pro Cycling Team	+ 24"
3	Magnus Cort (DEN)	EF Education–EasyPost	+ 34"
4	Daan Hoole (NED)	Lidl–Trek	+ 35"
5	Mattias Skjelmose (DEN)	Lidl–Trek	+ 45"
6	Niklas Larsen (DEN)	Uno-X Pro Cycling Team	+ 50"
7	Casper Pedersen (DEN)	Soudal–Quick-Step	+ 54"
8	Josef Černý (CZE)	Soudal–Quick-Step	+ 58"
9	Florian Vermeersch (BEL)	Lotto–Dstny	+ 1' 00"
10	Frederik Muff (DEN)	Team ColoQuick	+ 1' 00"

General classification after Stage 5
Rank	Rider	Team	Time
1	Mads Pedersen (DEN)	Lidl–Trek	16h 49' 16"
2	Mattias Skjelmose (DEN)	Lidl–Trek	+ 41"
3	Magnus Cort (DEN)	EF Education–EasyPost	+ 1' 19"
4	Søren Wærenskjold (NOR)	Uno-X Pro Cycling Team	+ 1' 29"
5	Florian Vermeersch (BEL)	Lotto–Dstny	+ 2' 03"
6	Alexander Kamp (DEN)	Tudor Pro Cycling Team	+ 2' 12"
7	Brent Van Moer (BEL)	Lotto–Dstny	+ 2' 28"
8	Mathias Bregnhøj (DEN)	Leopard TOGT Pro Cycling	+ 2' 28"
9	Toms Skujiņš (LAT)	Lidl–Trek	+ 2' 30"
10	Magnus Bak Klaris (DEN)	Restaurant Suri–Carl Ras	+ 2' 34"

== Classification leadership table ==
Classification leadership by stage
Stage	Winner	General classification	Points classification	Mountains classification	Young rider classification	Active rider classification	Team classification
1	Søren Wærenskjold	Søren Wærenskjold	Søren Wærenskjold	Mads Østergaard Kristensen	Filippo Ridolfo	Mads Østergaard Kristensen	Uno-X Pro Cycling Team
2	Fabio Jakobsen	Søren Wærenskjold	Søren Wærenskjold	Frederik Irgens Jensen	Filippo Ridolfo	Daniel Stampe	Uno-X Pro Cycling Team
3	Mattias Skjelmose	Mattias Skjelmose	Mads Pedersen	Nicklas Amdi Pedersen	Kasper Andersen	Nicklas Amdi Pedersen	Lidl–Trek
4	Fabio Jakobsen	Mattias Skjelmose	Fabio Jakobsen	Nicklas Amdi Pedersen	Kasper Andersen	Emil Vinjebo	Lidl–Trek
5	Mads Pedersen	Mads Pedersen	Mads Pedersen	Nicklas Amdi Pedersen	Logan Currie	Mads Østergaard Kristensen	Lidl–Trek
Final		Mads Pedersen	Mads Pedersen	Nicklas Amdi Pedersen	Logan Currie	Mads Østergaard Kristensen	Lidl–Trek

== Classification standings ==
Legend
Denotes the winner of the general classification	Denotes the winner of the young rider classification
Denotes the winner of the points classification	Denotes the winner of the active rider classification
Denotes the winner of the mountains classification	

=== General classification ===
Final general classification (1–10)
Rank	Rider	Team	Time
1	Mads Pedersen (DEN)	Lidl–Trek	16h 49' 16"
2	Mattias Skjelmose (DEN)	Lidl–Trek	+ 41"
3	Magnus Cort (DEN)	EF Education–EasyPost	+ 1' 19"
4	Søren Wærenskjold (NOR)	Uno-X Pro Cycling Team	+ 1' 29"
5	Florian Vermeersch (BEL)	Lotto–Dstny	+ 2' 03"
6	Alexander Kamp (DEN)	Tudor Pro Cycling Team	+ 2' 12"
7	Brent Van Moer (BEL)	Lotto–Dstny	+ 2' 28"
8	Mathias Bregnhøj (DEN)	Leopard TOGT Pro Cycling	+ 2' 28"
9	Toms Skujiņš (LAT)	Lidl–Trek	+ 2' 30"
10	Magnus Bak Klaris (DEN)	Restaurant Suri–Carl Ras	+ 2' 34"

=== Points classification ===
Final points classification (1–10)
Rank	Rider	Team	Time
1	Mads Pedersen (DEN)	Lidl–Trek	57
2	Søren Wærenskjold (NOR)	Uno-X Pro Cycling Team	48
3	Fabio Jakobsen (NED)	Soudal–Quick-Step	42
4	Mattias Skjelmose (DEN)	Lidl–Trek	30
5	Magnus Cort (DEN)	EF Education–EasyPost	26
6	Tobias Lund Andresen (DEN)	Team dsm–firmenich	24
7	Søren Kragh Andersen (DEN)	Alpecin–Deceuninck	17
8	Luca Colnaghi (ITA)	Green Project–Bardiani–CSF–Faizanè	13
9	Jensen Plowright (AUS)	Alpecin–Deceuninck	13
10	Florian Vermeersch (BEL)	Lotto–Dstny	12

=== Mountains classification ===
Final mountains classification (1–10)
Rank	Rider	Team	Time
1	Nicklas Amdi Pedersen (DEN)	Team ColoQuick	40
2	Jeppe Aaskov Pallesen (DEN)	HRE Mazowsze Serce Polski	32
3	Wessel Krul (NED)	Human Powered Health	26
4	Frederik Irgens Jensen (DEN)	BHS–PL Beton Bornholm	22
5	Mads Østergaard Kristensen (DEN)	Leopard TOGT Pro Cycling	20
6	Henrik Pedersen (DEN)	Team ColoQuick	18
7	Nikolaj Mengel (DEN)	BHS–PL Beton Bornholm	16
8	Emil Vinjebo (DEN)	Leopard TOGT Pro Cycling	12
9	Simon Pellaud (SUI)	Tudor Pro Cycling Team	10
10	Jules Hesters (BEL)	Team Flanders–Baloise	8

=== Young rider classification ===
Final young rider classification (1–10)
Rank	Rider	Team	Time
1	Logan Currie (NZL)	Bolton Equities Black Spoke	16h 52' 07"
2	Tobias Svarre (DEN)	Team ColoQuick	+ 27"
3	Kasper Andersen (DEN)	Team PostNord Landsholdet	+ 1' 13"
4	Matyáš Kopecký (CZE)	Team Novo Nordisk	+ 3' 09"
5	Jenno Berckmoes (BEL)	Team Flanders–Baloise	+ 4' 59"
6	Robin Juel Skivild (DEN)	Leopard TOGT Pro Cycling	+ 5' 11"
7	Marco Brenner (GER)	Team dsm–firmenich	+ 7' 26"
8	Martin Svrček (SVK)	Soudal–Quick-Step	+ 10' 24"
9	Tobias Lund Andresen (DEN)	Team dsm–firmenich	+ 11' 54"
10	Filippo Ridolfo (ITA)	Team Novo Nordisk	+ 15' 37"

=== Active rider classification ===
Final active rider classification (1–10)
Rank	Rider	Team	Time
1	Mads Østergaard Kristensen (DEN)	Leopard TOGT Pro Cycling	12
2	Emil Vinjebo (DEN)	Leopard TOGT Pro Cycling	12
3	Nicklas Amdi Pedersen (DEN)	Team ColoQuick	12
4	Daniel Stampe (DEN)	Restaurant Suri–Carl Ras	12
5	Frederik Muff (DEN)	Team ColoQuick	8
6	Rasmus Bøgh Wallin (DEN)	Restaurant Suri–Carl Ras	8
7	Jeppe Aaskov Pallesen (DEN)	HRE Mazowsze Serce Polski	8
8	Mark Stewart (GBR)	Bolton Equities Black Spoke	8
9	Sébastien Grignard (BEL)	Lotto–Dstny	4
10	Julias Johansen (DEN)	Team PostNord Landsholdet	4

=== Team classification ===
Final team classification (1–10)
Rank	Team	Time
1	(United States) Lidl–Trek	50h 30' 36"
2	(United States) EF Education–EasyPost	+ 4' 36"
3	(Denmark) Leopard TOGT Pro Cycling	+ 5' 27"
4	(Belgium) Alpecin–Deceuninck	+ 5' 33"
5	(Switzerland) Tudor Pro Cycling Team	+ 5' 58"
6	(Poland) HRE Mazowsze Serce Polski	+ 7' 52"
7	(Belgium) Lotto–Dstny	+ 10' 42"
8	(Belgium) Soudal–Quick-Step	+ 10' 58"
9	(Belgium) Team Flanders–Baloise	+ 11' 41"
10	(Norway) Uno-X Pro Cycling Team	+ 13' 57"
