= 2025 UCI Europe Tour =

Nineteenth season of the UCI Europe Tour

- Twenty-first edition of the UCI Europe Tour
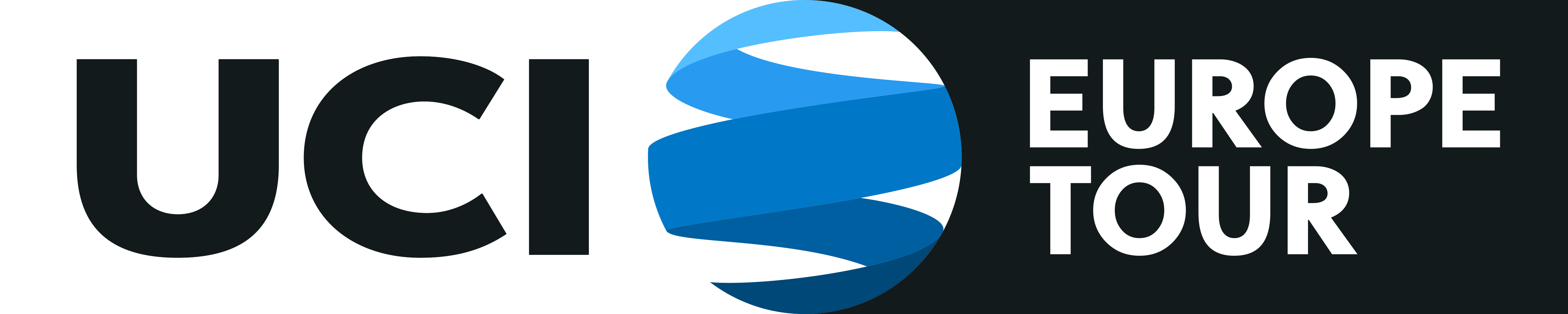

Details
- Dates: 24 January – 19 October 2025
- Location: Europe

The 2025 UCI Europe Tour is the 21st season of the UCI Europe Tour.

Throughout the season, points are awarded to the top finishers of stages within stage races and the final general classification standings of each of the stages races and one-day events. The quality and complexity of a race also determined how many points were awarded to the top finishers, the higher the UCI rating of a race, the more points were awarded.

The UCI ratings from highest to lowest were as follows:

- Multi-day events: 2.Pro, 2.1 and 2.2
- One-day events: 1.Pro, 1.1 and 1.2

== Events ==
=== January ===
Races in the 2025 UCI Europe Tour
Race	Rating	Date	Winner	Team
(Spain) Clàssica Camp de Morvedre	1.2	24 January	Urko Berrade (ESP)	Equipo Kern Pharma
(Spain) Gran Premio Castellón	1.1	25 January	António Morgado (POR)	UAE Team Emirates XRG
(Spain) Gran Premio Valencia	1.1	26 January	Marc Hirschi (SUI)	Tudor Pro Cycling Team
(Spain) Trofeo Calvià	1.1	29 January	Jan Christen (SUI)	UAE Team Emirates XRG
(Spain) Trofeo Felanitx-Ses Salines	1.1	30 January	Marijn van den Berg (NED)	EF Education–EasyPost
(Spain) Trofeo Serra Tramuntana	1.1	31 January	Florian Stork (GER)	Tudor Pro Cycling Team

=== February ===
Races in the 2025 UCI Europe Tour
Race	Rating	Date	Winner	Team
(Turkey) Grand Prix Antalya	1.2	1 February	Wan Abdul Rahman Hamdan (MAS)	Terengganu Cycling Team
(Spain) Trofeo Andratx - Pollença	1.1	1 February	The race was stopped after 25 kilometers and cancelled due to dangerous conditions.	
(Spain) Trofeo Palma	1.1	2 February	Iúri Leitão (POR)	Caja Rural–Seguros RGA
(France) Grand Prix La Marseillaise	1.1	2 February	Valentin Ferron (FRA)	Cofidis
(France) Étoile de Bessèges	2.1	5–9 February	Kévin Vauquelin (FRA)	Arkéa–B&B Hotels
(Turkey) Grand Prix Aspendos	1.2	8 February	Gerard Ledesma (ESP)	VC Fukuoka
(France) Tour de la Provence	2.1	14–16 February	Mads Pedersen (DEN)	Lidl–Trek
(Spain) Vuelta a Murcia	1.1	15 February	Fabio Christen (SUI)	Q36.5 Pro Cycling Team
(Spain) Clásica Jaén Paraíso Interior	1.1	17 February	Michał Kwiatkowski (POL)	INEOS Grenadiers
(France) Classic Var	1.1	21 February	Christian Scaroni (ITA)	XDS Astana Team
(France) Tour des Alpes-Maritimes	2.1	22–23 February	Christian Scaroni (ITA)	XDS Astana Team
(Spain) O Gran Camiño	2.1	26 February – 2 March	Derek Gee (CAN)	Israel–Premier Tech

=== March ===
Races in the 2025 UCI Europe Tour
Race	Rating	Date	Winner	Team
(Greece) Visit South Aegean Islands	2.2	1–2 March	Alexander Arnt Hansen (DEN)	Airtox–Carl Ras
(Belgium) Ename Samyn Classic	1.1	4 March	Mathieu van der Poel (NED)	Alpecin–Deceuninck
(Croatia) UMAG Classic	1.2	5 March	Matthias Schwarzbacher (SVK)	UAE Team Emirates Gen Z
(Belgium) Grand Prix Criquielion	1.1	8 March	Matteo Moschetti (ITA)	Q36.5 Pro Cycling Team
(Greece) International Rhodes Grand Prix	1.2	8 March	Marcin Budziński (POL)	ATT Investments
(France) Le Tour des 100 Communes	1.2	8 March	Matthew Brennan (GBR)	Visma–Lease a Bike Development
(Netherlands) Dorpenomloop Rucphen	1.2	9 March	Milan De Ceuster (BEL)	Lotto–Dstny Development Team
(Belgium) Grote Prijs Jean-Pierre Monseré	1.1	9 March	Alexys Brunel (FRA)	Team TotalEnergies
(Croatia) POREČ Classic	1.2	9 March	Matteo Milan (ITA)	Lidl–Trek Future Racing
(France) Grand Prix de la Ville de Lillers	1.2	9 March	Matthew Brennan (GBR)	Visma–Lease a Bike Development
(Greece) International Tour of Rhodes	2.2	13–16 March	Pierre-Henry Basset (FRA)	XDS Astana Development Team
(Croatia) Istrian Spring Trophy	2.2	13–16 March	Adrien Boichis (FRA)	Red Bull–Bora–Hansgrohe Rookies
(Italy) Popolarissima	1.2	16 March	Ivan Smirnov	XDS Astana Development Team
(Belgium) Youngster Coast Challenge	1.2U	21 March	Sente Sentjens (BEL)	Alpecin–Deceuninck Development Team
(Portugal) Troféu Internacional da Arrábida	1.2	23 March	Luca Giaimi (ITA)	UAE Team Emirates Gen Z
(France) Cholet Agglo Tour	1.1	23 March	Lukáš Kubiš (SVK)	Unibet Tietema Rockets
(Turkey) Grand Prix Apollon Temple	1.2	23 March	Bartosz Rudyk (POL)	Monogo Lubelskie Perła Polski
(Slovenia) GP Slovenian Istria	1.2	23 March	Michiel Coppens (BEL)	BEAT CC p/b Saxo
(Italy) Settimana Internazionale di Coppi e Bartali	2.1	25–29 March	Ben Tulett (GBR)	Visma–Lease a Bike
(Portugal) Volta ao Alentejo	2.2	26–30 March	Noah Hobbs (GBR)	EF Education–Aevolo
(Netherlands) Olympia's Tour	2.2	26–30 March	Antoine L'Hote (FRA)	Decathlon–AG2R La Mondiale Development Team
(Slovenia) GP Brda-Collio	1.2	27 March	Marcin Budziński (POL)	ATT Investments
(France) La Roue Tourangelle	1.1	30 March	Erlend Blikra (NOR)	Uno-X Mobility
I feel Slovenia VN Adria Mobil	1.2	30 March	Žak Eržen (SLO)	Bahrain Victorious Development Team

=== April ===
Races in the 2025 UCI Europe Tour
Race	Rating	Date	Winner	Team
(France) Paris–Camembert	1.1	2 April	Lander Loockx (BEL)	Unibet Tietema Rockets
(Greece) International Tour of Hellas	2.1	2–6 April	Harold Martín López (ECU)	XDS Astana Team
(France) La Route Adélie de VItré	1.1	4 April	Stian Fredheim (NOR)	Uno-X Mobility
(Netherlands) Volta NXT Classic	1.1	5 April	Dion Smith (NZL)	Intermarché–Wanty
(France) Boucle de l'Artois	1.2	5 April	Lewis Bower (NZL)	Groupama–FDJ United Continental Team
(Italy) Trofeo Piva	1.2U	6 April	Filippo Turconi (ITA)	VF Group–Bardiani–CSF–Faizanè
(Turkey) Grand Prix Syedra Ancient City	1.2	6 April	Stefan de Bod (RSA)	Terengganu Cycling Team
(France) Région Pays de la Loire Tour	2.1	8–11 April	Kévin Vauquelin (FRA)	Arkéa–B&B Hotels
(France) Circuit des Ardennes	2.2	9–13 April	Brady Gilmore (AUS)	Israel–Premier Tech
(Turkey) Tour of Mersin	2.2	10–13 April	Stefan de Bod (RSA)	Terengganu Cycling Team
(Italy) Giro della Città Metropolitana di Reggio Calabria	1.1	12 April	Luca Colnaghi (ITA)	VF Group–Bardiani–CSF–Faizanè
(Poland) Ślężański Mnich VeloBank Bruki & Szutry	1.2	13 April	Norbert Banaszek (POL)	ATT Investments
(France) Paris–Roubaix Espoirs	1.2U	13 April	Albert Philipsen (DEN)	Lidl–Trek Future Racing
(Italy) Trofeo Città di San Vendemiano	1.2U	13 April	Marco Schrettl (AUT)	Tirol KTM Cycling Team
(Italy) Il Giro d'Abruzzo	2.1	15–18 April	Georg Zimmermann (GER)	Intermarché–Wanty
(Belgium) Ronde van Limburg	1.1	16 April	Milan Fretin (BEL)	Cofidis
(France) Tour du Loir-et-Cher	2.2	16–20 April	Niklas Larsen (DEN)	BHS–PL Beton Bornholm
(France) Classic Grand Besançon Doubs	1.1	18 April	Guillaume Martin (FRA)	Groupama–FDJ
(France) Tour du Jura Cycliste	1.1	19 April	Guillaume Martin (FRA)	Groupama–FDJ
(Belgium) Liège–Bastogne–Liège U23	1.2U	19 April	Jarno Widar (BEL)	Lotto–Dstny Development Team
(France) Tour du Doubs	1.1	20 April	Mattéo Vercher (FRA)	Team TotalEnergies
(Italy) Giro del Belvedere	1.2U	21 April	Lorenzo Finn (ITA)	Red Bull–Bora–Hansgrohe Rookies
(Italy) Gran Premio Palio del Recioto	1.2U	22 April	Lorenzo Nespoli (ITA)	MBH Bank Ballan CSB
(Bosnia and Herzegovina) Belgrade–Banja Luka	2.2	23–26 April	Dušan Rajović (SRB)	Serbia (national team)
(Spain) Vuelta Asturias Julio Alvarez Mendo	2.1	24–27 April	Marc Soler (ESP)	UAE Team Emirates XRG
(Italy) Gran Premio della Liberazione	1.2U	25 April	Lorenzo Masciarelli (ITA)	MBH Bank Ballan CSB
(France) Le Tour de Bretagne Cycliste	2.2	25 April–1 May	Felix Ørn-Kristoff (NOR)	Wanty–Nippo–ReUz
(Italy) Giro della Provincia di Biella – Torino-Biella	1.2	27 April	Kasper Andersen (DEN)	Swatt Club
(United Kingdom) Rutland–Melton CiCLE Classic	1.2	27 April	Ben Granger (GBR)	MG.K Vis Costruzioni e Ambiente

=== May ===
Races in the 2025 UCI Europe Tour
Race	Rating	Date	Winner	Team
(Belgium) Tintrio – Omloop van het Waasland	1.2	1 May	Jensen Plowright (AUS)	Alpecin–Deceuninck Development Team
(Austria) GP Vorarlberg p/b Radhaus Rankweil	1.2	1 May	Jaka Marolt (SLO)	Factor Racing
(Germany) Eschborn–Frankfurt Under-23	1.2U	1 May	Conrad Haugsted (DEN)	Team ColoQuick
(Denmark) Grand Prix Herning	1.2	3 May	Stian Rosenlund (DEN)	Airtox–Carl Ras
(Belgium) Flèche Ardennaise	1.2	3 May	Jarno Widar (BEL)	Lotto–Dstny Development Team
(Denmark) Fyn Rundt – Tour of Funen	1.2	4 May	Daniel Stampe (DEN)	BHS–PL Beton Bornholm
(Belgium) Lotto Famenne Ardenne Classic	1.1	4 May	Max Kanter (GER)	XDS Astana Team
(France) Boucles de l'Aulne – Châteaulin	1.1	8 May	Lewis Askey (GBR)	Groupama–FDJ
(France) Tour du Finistère Pays de Quimper	1.1	9 May	Aubin Sparfel (FRA)	Decathlon–AG2R La Mondiale
(Poland) Silesian Beskid Classic	1.2	10 May	Marcin Budziński (POL)	ATT Investments
(Norway) Sundvolden GP	1.2	10 May	Andreas Leknessund (NOR)	Uno-X Mobility
(Norway) Ringerike GP	1.2	11 May	Sakarias Koller Løland (NOR)	Uno-X Mobility
(Switzerland) Radsportfest Märwil	1.2	11 May	Stefan Bissegger (SUI)	Switzerland (national team)
(Belgium) Gent–Wevelgem U23	1.2U	11 May	Alessandro Borgo (ITA)	Bahrain Victorious Development Team
(Italy) Gran Premio Industrie del Marmo	1.2U	11 May	Ilya Savekin	PC Baix Ebre
(Poland) Orlen Nations Grand Prix	2.Ncup	14–17 May	Marco Schrettl (AUT)	Austria (national team)
(Sweden) Giro Himledalen	1.2	17 May	Mads Andersen (DEN)	Airtox–Carl Ras
(Italy) Circuito del Porto – Trofeo Arvedi	1.2	18 May	Žak Eržen (SLO)	Bahrain Victorious Development Team
(Germany) Rund um Köln	1.1	18 May	Matthew Brennan (GBR)	Visma–Lease a Bike Development
(Netherlands) VDL Omloop der Kempen	1.2	18 May	Arne Santy (BEL)	Tarteletto–Isorex
(France) Ronde de l'Isard	2.2U	21–25 May	Jarno Widar (BEL)	Lotto Development Team
(Portugal) Grande Prémio Internacional Beiras e Serra da Estrela	2.1	23–25 May	Alexis Guérin (FRA)	Efapel Cycling
(Italy) Due Giorni Marchigiana - GP Santa Rita	1.2	24 May	Francesco Parravano (ITA)	MG.K Vis Costruzioni e Ambiente
(Italy) Due Giorni Marchigiana - Trofeo Città di Castelfidardo	1.2	25 May	Tommaso Dati (ITA)	Biesse–Carrera
(France) Mercan'Tour Classic	1.1	26 May	Cristián Rodríguez (ESP)	Arkéa–B&B Hotels
Tour of Albania	2.2	26–30 May	Tom Jonkmans (NED)	Wielerploeg Groot Amsterdam
(Luxembourg) Flèche du Sud	2.2	28 May–1 June	Martijn Rasenberg (NED)	Parkhotel Valkenburg CT
(France) Alpes Isère Tour	2.2	28 May–1 June	Aubin Sparfel (FRA)	Decathlon–AG2R La Mondiale Development Team
(Austria) Oberösterreich Rundfahrt	2.2	29 May–1 June	Edgar Cadena (MEX)	Petrolike
(Czech Republic) Course de la Paix U23 – Grand Prix Jeseníky	2.Ncup	29 May–1 June	Pau Martí (ESP)	Spain (national team)
Tour of Estonia	2.1	30–31 May	Marcus Sander Hansen (DEN)	BHS–PL Beton Bornholm

=== June ===
Races in the 2025 UCI Europe Tour
Race	Rating	Date	Winner	Team
(Italy) Coppa della Pace	1.2U	1 June	Diego Bracalente (ITA)	MBH Bank Ballan CSB
(Italy) Trofeo Alcide De Gasperi	1.2	2 June	Kyrylo Tsarenko (UKR)	Team Solution Tech–Vini Fantini
Tour of Lithuania	2.2	4–8 June	Martin Laas (EST)	Quick Pro Team
(Poland) Tour of Małopolska	2.2	5–8 June	Alexander Konychev (ITA)	Team Vorarlberg
(Belgium) Heylen Vastgoed Heistse Pijl	1.1	7 June	Paul Magnier (FRA)	Soudal–Quick-Step
(France) Paris–Troyes	1.2	9 June	Juan David Sierra (ITA)	Tudor Pro Cycling Team U23
(Belgium) Antwerp Port Epic	1.1	9 June	Timo Kielich (BEL)	Alpecin–Deceuninck
(Switzerland) GP Gippingen	1.1	13 June	Neilson Powless (USA)	EF Education–EasyPost
(Belgium) Elfstedenronde	1.1	15 June	Paul Magnier (FRA)	Soudal–Quick-Step
(Italy) Giro Next Gen	2.2U	15–22 June	Jakob Omrzel (SLO)	Bahrain Victorious Development Team
(France) La Route d'Occitanie	2.1	18–21 June	Nicolas Prodhomme (FRA)	Decathlon–AG2R La Mondiale
Andorra MoraBanc Clàssica	1.1	22 June	Mattias Skjelmose (DEN)	Lidl–Trek
(Italy) Giro dell'Appennino	1.1	24 June	Diego Ulissi (ITA)	XDS Astana Team

=== July ===
Races in the 2025 UCI Europe Tour
Race	Rating	Date	Winner	Team
(Italy) Trofeo Città di Brescia	1.2	1 July	Giovanni Bortoluzzi (ITA)	General Store–Essegibi–Fratelli Curia
(Poland) Course de Solidarność et des Champions Olympiques	2.2	2–5 July	Marceli Bogusławski (POL)	ATT Investments
(Romania) Sibiu Cycling Tour	2.1	3–6 July	Matthew Riccitello (USA)	Israel–Premier Tech
(Turkey) Grand Prix Kahramanmaraş	1.2	5 July	Nikiforos Arvanitou (GRE)	Greece (national team)
(Italy) Giro del Medio Brenta	1.2	6 July	Filippo Turconi (ITA)	Bardiani–CSF 7 Saber
(Netherlands) Midden–Brabant Poort Omloop	1.2	6 July	Timo de Jong (NED)	VolkerWessels Cycling Team
(Turkey) Grand Prix Edebiyat Yolu	1.2	6 July	Nikiforos Arvanitou (GRE)	Greece (national team)
Tour of Austria	2.1	9–13 July	Isaac del Toro (MEX)	UAE Team Emirates XRG
(Portugal) Troféu Joaquim Agostinho	2.2	10–13 July	Alexis Guérin (FRA)	Anicolor / Campicarn
(Hungary) Visegrad 4 Bicycle Race	1.2	12 July	Dario Igor Belletta (ITA)	Solme - Olmo
(Slovakia) Visegrad 4 Bicycle Race	1.2	13 July	Cesare Chesini (ITA)	MBH Bank Ballan CSB
(Italy) Tour of Valle d'Aosta	2.2U	16–20 July	Jarno Widar (BEL)	Lotto Development Team
(Poland) Visegrad 4 Bicycle Race	1.2	20 July	Norbert Banaszek (POL)	ATT Investments
(Spain) Clásica Terres de l'Ebre	1.1	21 July	Isaac del Toro (MEX)	UAE Team Emirates XRG
(Poland) Memoriał Andrzeja Trochanowskiego	1.2	22 July	Marceli Bogusławski (POL)	ATT Investments
(Poland) Dookoła Mazowsza	2.2	23–26 July	Šimon Vaníček (CZE)	ATT Investments
(Spain) Prueba Villafranca de Ordizia	1.1	25 July	Igor Arrieta (ESP)	UAE Team Emirates XRG
(France) Grand Prix de la ville de Pérenchies	1.2	27 July	Toon Vandebosch (BEL)	Alpecin–Deceuninck Development Team
(Poland) Puchar MON	1.2	27 July	Bartłomiej Proć (POL)	Santic–Wibatech
(Spain) Vuelta a Castilla y León	1.1	27 July	Haimar Etxeberria (ESP)	Equipo Kern Pharma
(France) Tour Alsace	2.2	30 July – 3 August	Markel Beloki (ESP)	EF Education–Aevolo

=== August ===
Races in the 2025 UCI Europe Tour
Race	Rating	Date	Winner	Team
(France) Tour de Guadeloupe	2.2	1–10 August	Andrés Ardila (COL)	Nu Colombia
(France) Kreiz Breizh Elites	2.2	2–4 August	Finn Crockett (IRL)	VolkerWessels Cycling Team
(Spain) Circuito de Getxo	1.1	3 August	Isaac del Toro (MEX)	UAE Team Emirates XRG
(France) Tour de l'Ain	2.1	6–8 August	Cian Uijtdebroeks (BEL)	Visma–Lease a Bike
(Romania) Tour of Szeklerland	2.2	6–9 August	Dominik Neuman (CZE)	ATT Investments
Volta a Portugal	2.1	6–17 August	Artem Nych	Anicolor / Tien 21
(Italy) Gran Premio di Poggiana	1.2U	10 August	Matteo Scalco (ITA)	VF Group–Bardiani–CSF–Faizanè
(Czech Republic) Czech Tour	2.1	14–17 August	Junior Lecerf (BEL)	Soudal–Quick-Step
(Italy) Gran Premio Capodarco	1.2U	16 August	Jakob Omrzel (SLO)	Bahrain Victorious Development Team
(France) Polynormande	1.1	17 August	Nicolas Prodhomme (FRA)	Decathlon–AG2R La Mondiale
(France) Tour du Limousin	2.1	19–22 August	Ewen Costiou (FRA)	Arkéa–B&B Hotels
(Poland) Tour Battle of Warsaw	2.2	20–24 August	Martin Voltr (CZE)	ATT Investments
(Czech Republic) West Bohemia Tour	2.2U	21–24 August	Federico Savino (ITA)	Soudal–Quick-Step Devo Team
(Estonia) Baltic Chain Tour	2.2	21–24 August	Rait Ärm (EST)	Estonia (national team)
(France) Tour de l'Avenir	2.Ncup	23–29 August	Paul Seixas (FRA)	France (national team)
(Turkey) Grand Prix Ordu	1.2	24 August	Rein Taaramäe (EST)	Kinan Racing Team
(France) Tour Poitou-Charentes en Nouvelle-Aquitaine	2.1	26–29 August	Samuel Leroux (FRA)	Team TotalEnergies
(Belgium) Muur Classic Geraardsbergen	1.1	27 August	Jonas Abrahamsen (NOR)	Uno-X Mobility
(Turkey) Tour of Route Salvation	2.2	27–30 August	Mathias Bregnhøj (DEN)	Terengganu Cycling Team
(Poland) Tour de Kurpie	2.2	27–30 August	Konrad Czabok (POL)	Mazowsze Serce Polski
(Netherlands) Slag om Norg	1.2	30 August	Finn Crockett (IRL)	VolkerWessels Cycling Team
Tour of Bulgaria	2.2	30 August – 4 September	Nikiforos Arvanitou (GRE)	Team United Shipping
(Belgium) IXINA Classic	1.2	31 August	Stijn Appel (NED)	BEAT Cycling Club
(France) Grand Prix de Plouay	1.2	31 August	Giovanni Lonardi (ITA)	Team Polti VisitMalta
(France) Grand Prix de la Somme	1.2	31 August	Romain Breant (FRA)	Sprinter Club Olympique Dijon
(Netherlands) Ronde van de Achterhoek	1.2	31 August	Johan Dorussen (NED)	Development Team Picnic–PostNL
(Slovenia) GP Kranj	1.2	31 August	José Juan Prieto (MEX)	Petrolike

=== September ===
Races in the 2025 UCI Europe Tour
Race	Rating	Date	Winner	Team
Tour of Kosovo	2.2	4–6 September	Danijel Agricola (NED)	Wielerploeg Groot Amsterdam
(Czech Republic) Okolo jižních Čech	2.2	4–7 September	William Smith (GBR)	Visma–Lease a Bike Development
(Italy) Giro della Regione Friuli Venezia Giulia	2.2	4–7 September	Lennart Jasch (GER)	Red Bull–Bora–Hansgrohe Rookies
(Turkey) Tour of İstanbul	2.1	4–7 September	Mauro Cuylits (BEL)	Lotto
(Italy) Giro di Toscana	1.1	10 September	Isaac del Toro (MEX)	UAE Team Emirates XRG
Tour of Romania	2.2	10–14 September	Cesare Chesini (ITA)	MBH Bank Ballan CSB
(Italy) Memorial Marco Pantani	1.1	13 September	Michael Storer (AUS)	Tudor Pro Cycling Team
(Belgium) GP Rik Van Looy	1.2	14 September	Mads Andersen (DEN)	Airtox–Carl Ras
(Italy) Trofeo Matteotti	1.1	14 September	Isaac del Toro (MEX)	UAE Team Emirates XRG
(Slovakia) Okolo Slovenska	2.1	17–21 September	Paul Double (GBR)	Team Jayco–AlUla
(Belgium) Kampioenschap van Vlaanderen	1.1	19 September	Jonathan Milan (ITA)	Lidl–Trek
(Italy) Milano-Rapallo	1.2	20 September	Alessandro Fancellu (ITA)	Team UKYO
(Belgium) Gooikse Pijl	1.1	21 September	Oded Kogut (ISR)	Israel–Premier Tech
(France) Grand Prix d'Isbergues	1.1	21 September	Olav Kooij (NED)	Visma–Lease a Bike
(Italy) Giro della Romagna	1.1	21 September	Christian Scaroni (ITA)	XDS Astana Team
(Belgium) Omloop van het Houtland	1.1	24 September	Tim Merlier (BEL)	Soudal–Quick-Step
(France) Tour de la Mirabelle	1.2	26 September	Samuele Zoccarato (ITA)	Team Polti VisitMalta
(Belgium) Grand Prix Cerami	1.2	27 September	Gilles Dockx (BEL)	Wanty–Nippo–ReUz
(Netherlands) Arno Wallaard Memorial	1.2	27 September	Stian Rosenlund (DEN)	Airtox–Carl Ras
(France) Paris-Chauny	1.1	28 September	Arnaud De Lie (BEL)	Lotto
(Italy) Ruota d'Oro	1.2U	30 September	Joseph Brookes (GBR)	AVC Aix Provence Dole
(Croatia) CRO Race	2.1	30 September – 5 October	Brandon McNulty (USA)	UAE Team Emirates XRG

=== October ===
Races in the 2025 UCI Europe Tour
Race	Rating	Date	Winner	Team
(Italy) Piccolo Giro di Lombardia	1.2U	4 October	Callum Thornley (GBR)	Red Bull–Bora–Hansgrohe Rookies
(Italy) Coppa Agostoni	1.1	5 October	Adam Yates (GBR)	UAE Team Emirates XRG
(Italy) Coppa Città di San Daniele	1.2	7 October	Lorenzo Finn (ITA)	Red Bull–Bora–Hansgrohe Rookies
(Belgium) Binche–Chimay–Binche	1.1	7 October	Jordi Meeus (BEL)	Red Bull–Bora–Hansgrohe
(France) Tour de Vendée	1.1	11 October	Dorian Godon (FRA)	Decathlon–AG2R La Mondiale
(France) Paris–Tours Espoirs	1.2U	12 October	Maxime Decomble (FRA)	Équipe Continentale Groupama–FDJ
(Italy) Trofeo Tessile & Moda	1.1	12 October	Adam Yates (GBR)	UAE Team Emirates XRG
(Netherlands) Tour of Holland	2.1	14–19 October	Christophe Laporte (FRA)	Visma–Lease a Bike
(Serbia) Tour de Serbie	2.2	16–19 October	Lorenzo Cataldo (ITA)	Gragnano Sporting Club
(France) Chrono des Nations Espoirs	1.2U	19 October	Arthur Blaise (FRA)	Decathlon–AG2R La Mondiale Development Team
(France) Chrono des Nations	1.1	19 October	Josh Tarling (GBR)	INEOS Grenadiers
