= 2026 Danmark Rundt =

2026 UCI ProSeries
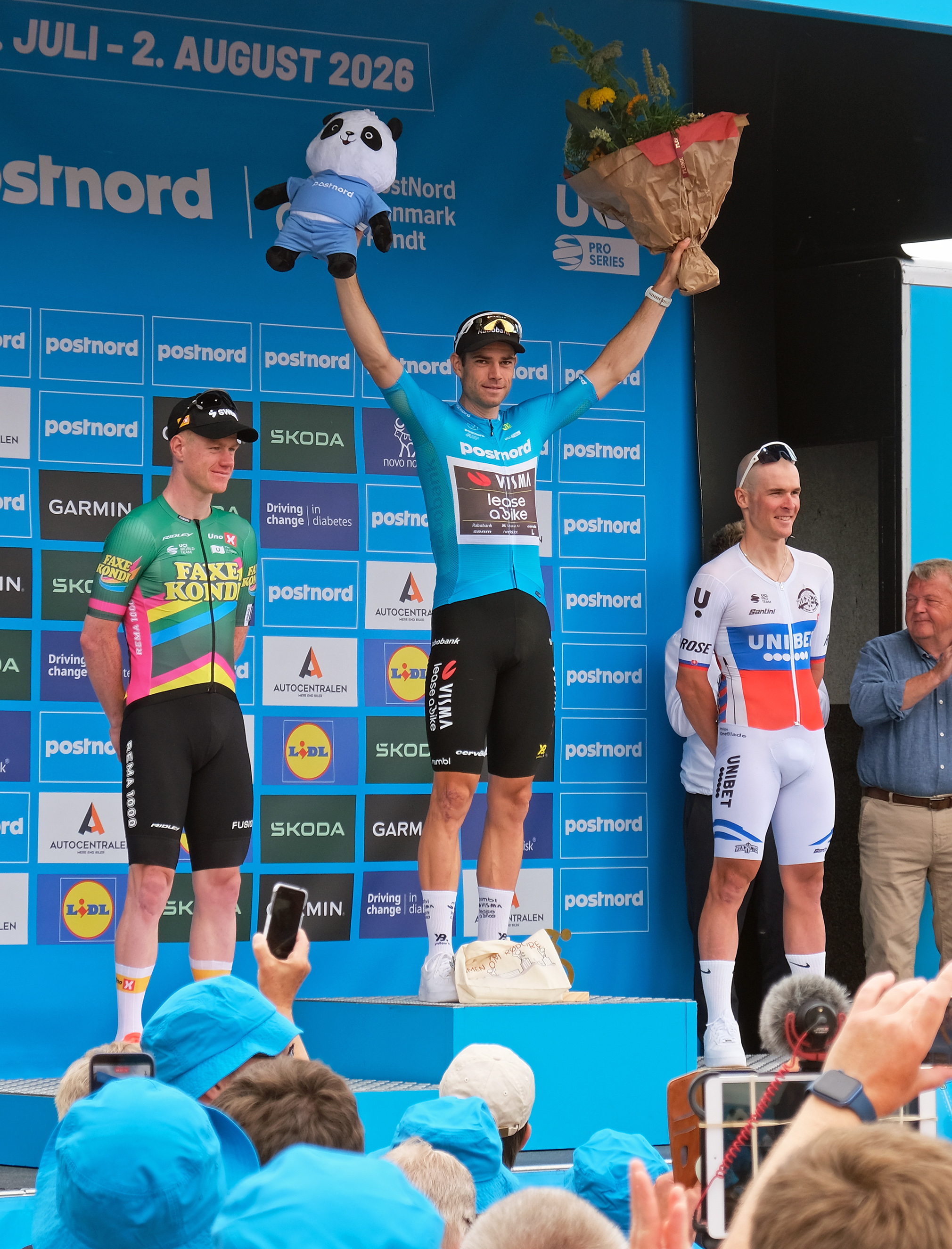

Race details
- Dates: 29 July–2 August 2026
- Stages: 5
- Distance: 881.6 km (547.8 mi)
- Winning time: 19h 22' 23"

Results
Jersey awarded to the overall winner	Winner	Wout van Aert (BEL)	(Visma–Lease a Bike)
	Second	Lukáš Kubiš (SVK)	(Unibet Rose Rockets)
	Third	Henrik Pedersen (DEN)	(Uno-X Mobility)
Jersey awarded to the points classification winner	Points	Wout van Aert (BEL)	(Visma–Lease a Bike)
Jersey awarded to the mountains classification winner	Mountains	Aksel Bech Skot-Hansen (DEN)	(Team Give Steel)
Jersey awarded to the young rider classification winner	Young rider	Henrik Pedersen (DEN)	(Uno-X Mobility)
	Team	(France) Unibet Rose Rockets	

The 2026 Danmark Rundt (officially PostNord Danmark Rundt 2026 for sponsorship reasons) is the 35th edition of the Danmark Rundt road cycling stage race, which is the part of the 2026 UCI ProSeries. It began on 29 July in Aalborg and finishes on 2 August in Rødovre.

== Teams ==
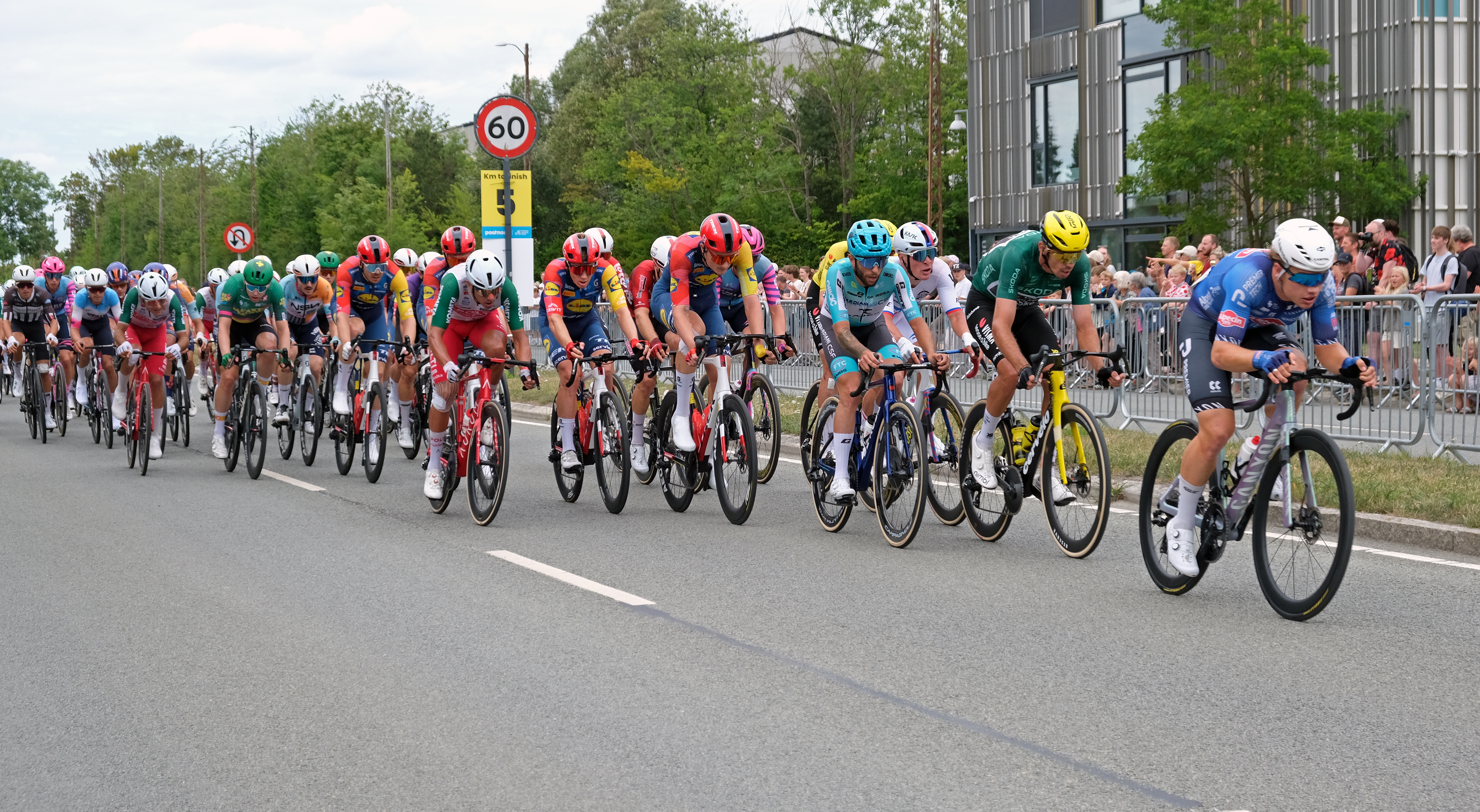
Stage 5 in Rødovre

Seven UCI WorldTeams, seven UCI ProTeams, six UCI Continental teams and the Danish national team made up the twenty one teams that participate in the race.

UCI WorldTeams

- Alpecin–Premier Tech
- Lidl–Trek
- Lotto–Intermarché
- NSN Cycling Team
- Team Picnic–PostNL
- Uno-X Mobility
- Visma–Lease a Bike

UCI ProTeams

- Bardiani–CSF 7 Saber
- MBH Bank CSB Telecom Fort
- Modern Adventure Pro Cycling
- Team Flanders–Baloise
- Team Novo Nordisk
- Team Polti VisitMalta
- Unibet Rose Rockets

UCI Continental Teams

- Airtox–Carl Ras
- BHS–PL Beton Bornholm
- Lucky Sport Cycling Team
- Swatt Club
- Team ColoQuick
- Team Give Steel

National Teams

- Denmark

== Route ==
Stage characteristics and winners
Stage	Date	Course	Distance	Type	Stage winner
1	29 July	Aalborg to Aalborg	197.2 km (122.5 mi)	Hilly stage	Wout van Aert (BEL)
2	30 July	Glyngøre to Skive	182.9 km (113.6 mi)	Flat stage	Wout van Aert (BEL)
3	31 July	Fredericia to Vejle	202.9 km (126.1 mi)	Hilly stage	Wout van Aert (BEL)
4	1 August	Rudkøbing to Faaborg	172.6 km (107.2 mi)	Hilly stage	Storm Ingebrigtsen (NOR)
5	2 August	Køge to Rødovre	126 km (78 mi)	Flat stage	Rasmus Søjberg Pedersen (DEN)
Total			881.6 km (547.8 mi)		

== Stages ==
=== Stage 1 ===
29 July 2026 — Aalborg to Aalborg, 197.2 km (122.5 mi)

Stage 1 Result
Rank	Rider	Team	Time
1	Wout van Aert (BEL)	Visma–Lease a Bike	4h 10' 49"
2	Lukáš Kubiš (SVK)	Unibet Rose Rockets	+ 0"
3	Henrik Pedersen (DEN)	Uno-X Mobility	+ 0"
4	Tim Torn Teutenberg (GER)	Lidl–Trek	+ 0"
5	Pier-André Côté (CAN)	NSN Cycling Team	+ 0"
6	Christophe Laporte (FRA)	Visma–Lease a Bike	+ 0"
7	Tomáš Kopecký (CZE)	Unibet Rose Rockets	+ 0"
8	Søren Kragh Andersen (DEN)	Lidl–Trek	+ 0"
9	Jensen Plowright (AUS)	Alpecin–Premier Tech	+ 17"
10	Anders Foldager (DEN)	Denmark	+ 17"

General classification after Stage 1
Rank	Rider	Team	Time
1	Wout van Aert (BEL)	Visma–Lease a Bike	4h 10' 39"
2	Lukáš Kubiš (SVK)	Unibet Rose Rockets	+ 4"
3	Henrik Pedersen (DEN)	Uno-X Mobility	+ 6"
4	Tim Torn Teutenberg (GER)	Lidl–Trek	+ 10"
5	Pier-André Côté (CAN)	NSN Cycling Team	+ 10"
6	Christophe Laporte (FRA)	Visma–Lease a Bike	+ 10"
7	Tomáš Kopecký (CZE)	Unibet Rose Rockets	+ 10"
8	Søren Kragh Andersen (DEN)	Lidl–Trek	+ 10"
9	Matias Malmberg (DEN)	Swatt Club	+ 22"
10	Jensen Plowright (AUS)	Alpecin–Premier Tech	+ 27"

=== Stage 2 ===
30 July 2026 — Glyngøre to Skive, 182.9 km (113.6 mi)

Stage 2 Result
Rank	Rider	Team	Time
1	Wout van Aert (BEL)	Visma–Lease a Bike	3h 59' 41"
2	Jensen Plowright (AUS)	Alpecin–Premier Tech	+ 0"
3	Toon Aerts (BEL)	Lotto–Intermarché	+ 0"
4	Giovanni Lonardi (ITA)	Team Polti VisitMalta	+ 0"
5	Carl-Frederik Bévort (DEN)	Uno-X Mobility	+ 0"
6	Max Walscheid (GER)	Lidl–Trek	+ 0"
7	Enrico Zanoncello (ITA)	Bardiani–CSF 7 Saber	+ 0"
8	Ben Oliver (NZL)	Modern Adventure Pro Cycling	+ 0"
9	Matys Grisel (FRA)	Lotto–Intermarché	+ 0"
10	Lukáš Kubiš (SVK)	Unibet Rose Rockets	+ 0"

General classification after Stage 2
Rank	Rider	Team	Time
1	Wout van Aert (BEL)	Visma–Lease a Bike	8h 10' 10"
2	Lukáš Kubiš (SVK)	Unibet Rose Rockets	+ 14"
3	Henrik Pedersen (DEN)	Uno-X Mobility	+ 16"
4	Pier-André Côté (CAN)	NSN Cycling Team	+ 20"
5	Tim Torn Teutenberg (GER)	Lidl–Trek	+ 20"
6	Tomáš Kopecký (CZE)	Unibet Rose Rockets	+ 20"
7	Christophe Laporte (FRA)	Visma–Lease a Bike	+ 20"
8	Søren Kragh Andersen (DEN)	Lidl–Trek	+ 20"
9	Gustav Wang (DEN)	Denmark	+ 29"
10	Jensen Plowright (AUS)	Alpecin–Premier Tech	+ 31"

=== Stage 3 ===
31 July 2026 — Fredericia to Vejle, 202.9 km (126.1 mi)

Stage 3 Result
Rank	Rider	Team	Time
1	Wout van Aert (BEL)	Visma–Lease a Bike	4h 55' 17"
2	Lukáš Kubiš (SVK)	Unibet Rose Rockets	+ 2"
3	Christophe Laporte (FRA)	Visma–Lease a Bike	+ 4"
4	Henrik Pedersen (DEN)	Uno-X Mobility	+ 4"
5	Søren Kragh Andersen (DEN)	Lidl–Trek	+ 8"
6	Francisco Muñoz (ESP)	Team Polti VisitMalta	+ 12"
7	Pier-André Côté (CAN)	NSN Cycling Team	+ 14"
8	Tomáš Kopecký (CZE)	Unibet Rose Rockets	+ 15"
9	Matyáš Kopecký (CZE)	Unibet Rose Rockets	+ 21"
10	Alexander Kamp (DEN)	Uno-X Mobility	+ 26"

General classification after Stage 3
Rank	Rider	Team	Time
1	Wout van Aert (BEL)	Visma–Lease a Bike	13h 05' 17"
2	Lukáš Kubiš (SVK)	Unibet Rose Rockets	+ 20"
3	Christophe Laporte (FRA)	Visma–Lease a Bike	+ 30"
4	Henrik Pedersen (DEN)	Uno-X Mobility	+ 30"
5	Søren Kragh Andersen (DEN)	Lidl–Trek	+ 38"
6	Pier-André Côté (CAN)	NSN Cycling Team	+ 44"
7	Tomáš Kopecký (CZE)	Unibet Rose Rockets	+ 45"
8	Francisco Muñoz (ESP)	Team Polti VisitMalta	+ 59"
9	Matyáš Kopecký (CZE)	Unibet Rose Rockets	+ 1' 05"
10	Alexander Kamp (DEN)	Uno-X Mobility	+ 1' 13"

=== Stage 4 ===
1 August 2026 — Rudkøbing to Faaborg, 172.6 km (107.2 mi)

Stage 4 Result
Rank	Rider	Team	Time
1	Storm Ingebrigtsen (NOR)	Uno-X Mobility	3h 46' 46"
2	Tommaso Bessega (ITA)	Team Polti VisitMalta	+ 15"
3	Axel Källberg (FIN)	Lucky Sport Cycling Team	+ 15"
4	Sébastien Grignard (BEL)	Lotto–Intermarché	+ 15"
5	Christopher Juul-Jensen (DEN)	Denmark	+ 17"
6	Jensen Plowright (AUS)	Alpecin–Premier Tech	+ 20"
7	Toon Aerts (BEL)	Lotto–Intermarché	+ 20"
8	Tim Torn Teutenberg (GER)	Lidl–Trek	+ 20"
9	Christophe Laporte (FRA)	Visma–Lease a Bike	+ 20"
10	Pier-André Côté (CAN)	NSN Cycling Team	+ 20"

General classification after Stage 4
Rank	Rider	Team	Time
1	Wout van Aert (BEL)	Visma–Lease a Bike	16h 52' 22"
2	Lukáš Kubiš (SVK)	Unibet Rose Rockets	+ 21"
3	Henrik Pedersen (DEN)	Uno-X Mobility	+ 28"
4	Christophe Laporte (FRA)	Visma–Lease a Bike	+ 29"
5	Søren Kragh Andersen (DEN)	Lidl–Trek	+ 39"
6	Pier-André Côté (CAN)	NSN Cycling Team	+ 45"
7	Tomáš Kopecký (CZE)	Unibet Rose Rockets	+ 46"
8	Francisco Muñoz (ESP)	Team Polti VisitMalta	+ 1' 00"
9	Matyáš Kopecký (CZE)	Unibet Rose Rockets	+ 1' 06"
10	Alexander Kamp (DEN)	Uno-X Mobility	+ 1' 14"

=== Stage 5 ===
2 August 2026 — Køge to Rødovre, 126 km (78 mi)

Stage 5 Result
Rank	Rider	Team	Time
1	Rasmus Søjberg Pedersen (DEN)	Denmark	2h 30' 01"
2	Max Walscheid (GER)	Lidl–Trek	+ 0"
3	Tom Crabbe (BEL)	Team Flanders–Baloise	+ 0"
4	Giovanni Lonardi (ITA)	Team Polti VisitMalta	+ 0"
5	Riley Sheehan (USA)	NSN Cycling Team	+ 0"
6	Jensen Plowright (AUS)	Alpecin–Premier Tech	+ 0"
7	Henrik Pedersen (DEN)	Uno-X Mobility	+ 0"
8	Nils Eekhoff (NED)	Team Picnic–PostNL	+ 0"
9	Stian Roselund (DEN)	Airtox–Carl Ras	+ 0"
10	Boas Lysgaard (DEN)	BHS–PL Beton Bornholm	+ 0"

Final general classification
Rank	Rider	Team	Time
1	Wout van Aert (BEL)	Visma–Lease a Bike	19h 22' 23"
2	Lukáš Kubiš (SVK)	Unibet Rose Rockets	+ 21"
3	Henrik Pedersen (DEN)	Uno-X Mobility	+ 28"
4	Christophe Laporte (FRA)	Visma–Lease a Bike	+ 29"
5	Søren Kragh Andersen (DEN)	Lidl–Trek	+ 39"
6	Pier-André Côté (CAN)	NSN Cycling Team	+ 45"
7	Tomáš Kopecký (CZE)	Unibet Rose Rockets	+ 46"
8	Francisco Muñoz (ESP)	Team Polti VisitMalta	+ 1' 00"
9	Matyáš Kopecký (CZE)	Unibet Rose Rockets	+ 1' 06"
10	Alexander Kamp (DEN)	Uno-X Mobility	+ 1' 14"

== Classification leadership table ==
Stage	Winner	General classification	Points classification	Mountains classification	Young rider classification	Active rider classification	Team classification
1	Wout van Aert	Wout van Aert	Wout van Aert	Sebastian Nielsen	Henrik Pedersen	Matias Malmberg	Visma–Lease a Bike
2	Wout van Aert	Wout van Aert	Wout van Aert	Sebastian Nielsen	Henrik Pedersen	Nikolaj Mengel	Visma–Lease a Bike
3	Wout van Aert	Wout van Aert	Wout van Aert	Aksel Bech Skot-Hansen	Henrik Pedersen	Andreas Stokbro	Unibet Rose Rockets
4	Storm Ingebrigtsen	Wout van Aert	Wout van Aert	Aksel Bech Skot-Hansen	Henrik Pedersen	Axel Källberg	Unibet Rose Rockets
5	Rasmus Søjberg Pedersen	Wout van Aert	Wout van Aert	Aksel Bech Skot-Hansen	Henrik Pedersen	Mirco Maestri	Unibet Rose Rockets
Final		Wout van Aert	Wout van Aert	Aksel Bech Skot-Hansen	Henrik Pedersen		Unibet Rose Rockets

== Classification standings ==
Legend
Denotes the leader of the general classification	Denotes the leader of the young rider classification
Denotes the leader of the points classification	Denotes the leader of the active rider classification
Denotes the leader of the hills classification	

=== General classification ===
Final general classification (1–10)
Rank	Rider	Team	Time
1	Wout van Aert (BEL)	Visma–Lease a Bike	19h 22' 23"
2	Lukáš Kubiš (SVK)	Unibet Rose Rockets	+ 21"
3	Henrik Pedersen (DEN)	Uno-X Mobility	+ 28"
4	Christophe Laporte (FRA)	Visma–Lease a Bike	+ 29"
5	Søren Kragh Andersen (DEN)	Lidl–Trek	+ 39"
6	Pier-André Côté (CAN)	NSN Cycling Team	+ 45"
7	Tomáš Kopecký (CZE)	Unibet Rose Rockets	+ 46"
8	Francisco Muñoz (ESP)	Team Polti VisitMalta	+ 1' 00"
9	Matyáš Kopecký (CZE)	Unibet Rose Rockets	+ 1' 06"
10	Alexander Kamp (DEN)	Uno-X Mobility	+ 1' 14"

=== Points classification ===
Final points classification (1–10)
Rank	Rider	Team	Points
1	Wout van Aert (BEL)	Visma–Lease a Bike	49
2	Henrik Pedersen (DEN)	Uno-X Mobility	30
3	Jensen Plowright (AUS)	Alpecin–Premier Tech	30
4	Lukáš Kubiš (SVK)	Unibet Rose Rockets	27
5	Christophe Laporte (FRA)	Visma–Lease a Bike	24
6	Tim Torn Teutenberg (GER)	Lidl–Trek	19
7	Max Walscheid (GER)	Lidl–Trek	19
8	Giovanni Leonardi (ITA)	Team Polti VisitMalta	18
9	Pier-André Côté (CAN)	NSN Cycling Team	17
10	Toon Aerts (BEL)	Lotto–Intermarché	16

=== Hills classification ===
Final hills classification (1–10)
Rank	Rider	Team	Points
1	Aksel Bech Skot-Hansen (DEN)	Team Give Steel	42
2	Andreas Stokbro (DEN)	Team ColoQuick	28
3	Sebastian Nielsen (DEN)	Team ColoQuick	28
4	Boas Lysgaard (DEN)	BHS–PL Beton Bornholm	24
5	Matias Malmberg (DEN)	Swatt Club	16
6	Menno Huising (NED)	Visma–Lease a Bike	12
7	Axel Källberg (FIN)	Lucky Sport Cycling Team	12
8	Henrik Pedersen (DEN)	Uno-X Mobility	8
9	Storm Ingebrigtsen (NOR)	Uno-X Mobility	8
10	Rasmus Tiller (NOR)	Uno-X Mobility	8

=== Young rider classification ===
Final young rider classification (1–10)
Rank	Rider	Team	Time
1	Henrik Pedersen (DEN)	Uno-X Mobility	19h 22' 51"
2	Teodor De Luca (SWE)	Lucky Sport Cycling Team	+ 1' 56"
3	Luca Paletti (ITA)	Bardiani–CSF 7 Saber	+ 2' 00"
4	Santiago Ferraro (ITA)	Bardiani–CSF 7 Saber	+ 2' 03"
5	Menno Huising (NED)	Visma–Lease a Bike	+ 2' 07"
6	Dario Belletta (ITA)	Team Polti VisitMalta	+ 2' 18"
7	Matys Grisel (FRA)	Lotto–Intermarché	+ 3' 29"
8	Storm Ingebrigtsen (NOR)	Uno-X Mobility	+ 5' 34"
9	Filippo Turconi (ITA)	Bardiani–CSF 7 Saber	+ 5' 47"
10	Pietro Mattio (ITA)	Visma–Lease a Bike	+ 5' 54"

=== Active rider classification ===
Final active rider classification (1–10)
Rank	Rider	Team	Points
1	Mirco Maestri (ITA)	Team Polti VisitMalta	12
2	Nikolaj Mengel (DEN)	Airtox–Carl Ras	12
3	Axel Källberg (FIN)	Lucky Sport Cycling Team	12
4	Matias Malmberg (DEN)	Swatt Club	12
5	Andreas Stokbro (DEN)	Team ColoQuick	12
6	Samuele Zoccarato (ITA)	MBH Bank CSB Telecom Fort	8
7	Tyler Stites (USA)	Modern Adventure Pro Cycling	8
8	Stian Rosenlund (DEN)	Airtox–Carl Ras	8
9	Sebastian Nielsen (DEN)	Team ColoQuick	8
10	Aksel Bech Skot-Hansen (DEN)	Team Give Steel	8

=== Team classification ===
Final team classification (1–10)
Rank	Team	Time
1	(France) Unibet Rose Rockets	58h 09' 37"
2	(Norway) Uno-X Mobility	+ 24"
3	(Netherlands) Visma–Lease a Bike	+ 1' 06"
4	(Italy) Team Polti VisitMalta	+ 8' 06"
5	(Hungary) MBH Bank CSB Telecom Fort	+ 8' 18"
6	(Italy) Bardiani–CSF 7 Saber	+ 8' 46"
7	(Germany) Lidl–Trek	+ 8' 53"
8	(Belgium) Lotto–Intermarché	+ 10' 32"
9	(Belgium) Alpecin–Premier Tech	+ 11' 13"
10	Denmark	+ 14' 47"
