= 2025 Uno-X Mobility (men's team) season =

Uno-X Mobility
- 2025 season
- UCI code: UXM
- Status: UCI ProTeam
- Manager: (Norway) Jens Haugland
- Based: Norway
- Bicycles: Dare
- Groupset: Shimano

Season victories
- One-day races: 5
- Stage race overall: 1
- Stage race stages: 7
- National Championships: 1
- Most wins: (Denmark) Magnus Cort (3)

The 2025 season for the Uno-X Mobility team is the team's 9th season in existence, and its 6th season as a UCI ProTeam.

== Team roster ==
All ages are as of 1 January 2025, the first day of the 2025 season.

As of 7 January 2025.

| Rider | Date of birth |
|---|---|
| Jonas Abrahamsen (NOR) | 20 September 1995 (aged 29) |
| Erlend Blikra (NOR) | 11 January 1997 (aged 27) |
| Carl-Frederik Bévort (DEN) | 24 November 2003 (aged 21) |
| Magnus Cort (DEN) | 16 January 1993 (aged 31) |
| Simon Dalby (DEN) | 29 January 2003 (aged 21) |
| Fredrik Dversnes (NOR) | 20 March 1997 (aged 27) |
| Stian Fredheim (NOR) | 23 March 2003 (aged 21) |
| Markus Hoelgaard (NOR) | 4 October 1994 (aged 30) |
| Ådne Holter (NOR) | 8 July 2000 (aged 24) |
| Jonas Iversby Hvideberg (NOR) | 9 February 1999 (aged 25) |
| Amund Grøndahl Jansen (NOR) | 11 February 1994 (aged 30) |
| Anders Halland Johannessen (NOR) | 23 August 1999 (aged 25) |
| Tobias Halland Johannessen (NOR) | 23 August 1999 (aged 25) |
| Alexander Kristoff (NOR) | 5 July 1987 (aged 37) |

| Rider | Date of birth |
|---|---|
| Andreas Kron (DEN) | 1 June 1998 (aged 26) |
| Johannes Kulset (NOR) | 14 April 2004 (aged 20) |
| Magnus Kulset (NOR) | 18 August 2000 (aged 24) |
| Andreas Leknessund (NOR) | 21 May 1999 (aged 25) |
| William Blume Levy (DEN) | 14 January 2001 (aged 23) |
| Sakarias Koller Løland (NOR) | 20 September 2001 (aged 23) |
| Henrik Pedersen (DEN) | 3 December 2004 (aged 20) |
| Erik Resell (NOR) | 28 September 1996 (aged 28) |
| Anders Skaarseth (NOR) | 7 May 1995 (aged 29) |
| Rasmus Tiller (NOR) | 28 July 1996 (aged 28) |
| Martin Urianstad (NOR) | 6 February 1999 (aged 25) |
| Søren Wærenskjold (NOR) | 12 March 2000 (aged 24) |
| Rasmus Bøgh Wallin (DEN) | 2 January 1996 (aged 28) |

== Season victories ==
| Date | Race | Competition | Rider | Country | Location | Ref. |
|---|---|---|---|---|---|---|
| 6 February | Étoile de Bessèges, stage 2 | UCI Europe Tour | Søren Wærenskjold (NOR) | France | Marguerittes | |
| 21 February | Vuelta a Andalucía, stage 3 | UCI ProSeries | Alexander Kristoff (NOR) | Spain | Pozoblanco | |
| 26 February | O Gran Camiño, stage 1 | UCI Europe Tour | Magnus Cort (DEN) | Portugal | Matosinhos | |
| 27 February | O Gran Camiño, stage 2 | UCI Europe Tour | Magnus Cort (DEN) | Spain | A Estrada | |
| 1 March | Omloop Het Nieuwsblad | UCI World Tour | Søren Wærenskjold (NOR) | Belgium | Ninove | |
| 2 March | O Gran Camiño, stage 5 | UCI Europe Tour | Magnus Cort (DEN) | Spain | Santiago de Compostela | |
| 14 March | Tirreno–Adriatico, stage 5 | UCI World Tour | Fredrik Dversnes (NOR) | Italy | Pergola | |
| 30 March | La Roue Tourangelle | UCI Europe Tour | Erlend Blikra (NOR) | France | Tours | |
| 4 April | Route Adélie de Vitré | UCI Europe Tour | Stian Fredheim (NOR) | France | Vitré | |
| 10 May | Sundvolden GP | UCI Europe Tour | Andreas Leknessund (NOR) | Norway | Krokkleiva | |
| 11 May | Ringerike GP | UCI Europe Tour | Sakarias Koller Løland (NOR) | Norway | Hønefoss | |
| 8 June | Tour of Slovenia, overall | UCI ProSeries | Anders Halland Johannessen (NOR) | Slovenia | | |
| 16 July | Tour de France, stage 11 | UCI World Tour | Jonas Abrahamsen (NOR) | France | Toulouse | |

== National, Continental, and World Champions ==
| Date | Discipline | Jersey | Rider | Country | Location | Ref. |
|---|---|---|---|---|---|---|
| 29 June | Norwegian National Road Race Championships | | Andreas Leknessund (NOR) | Norway | Hønefoss | |
