= Magnus Bak Klaris =

Danish cyclist

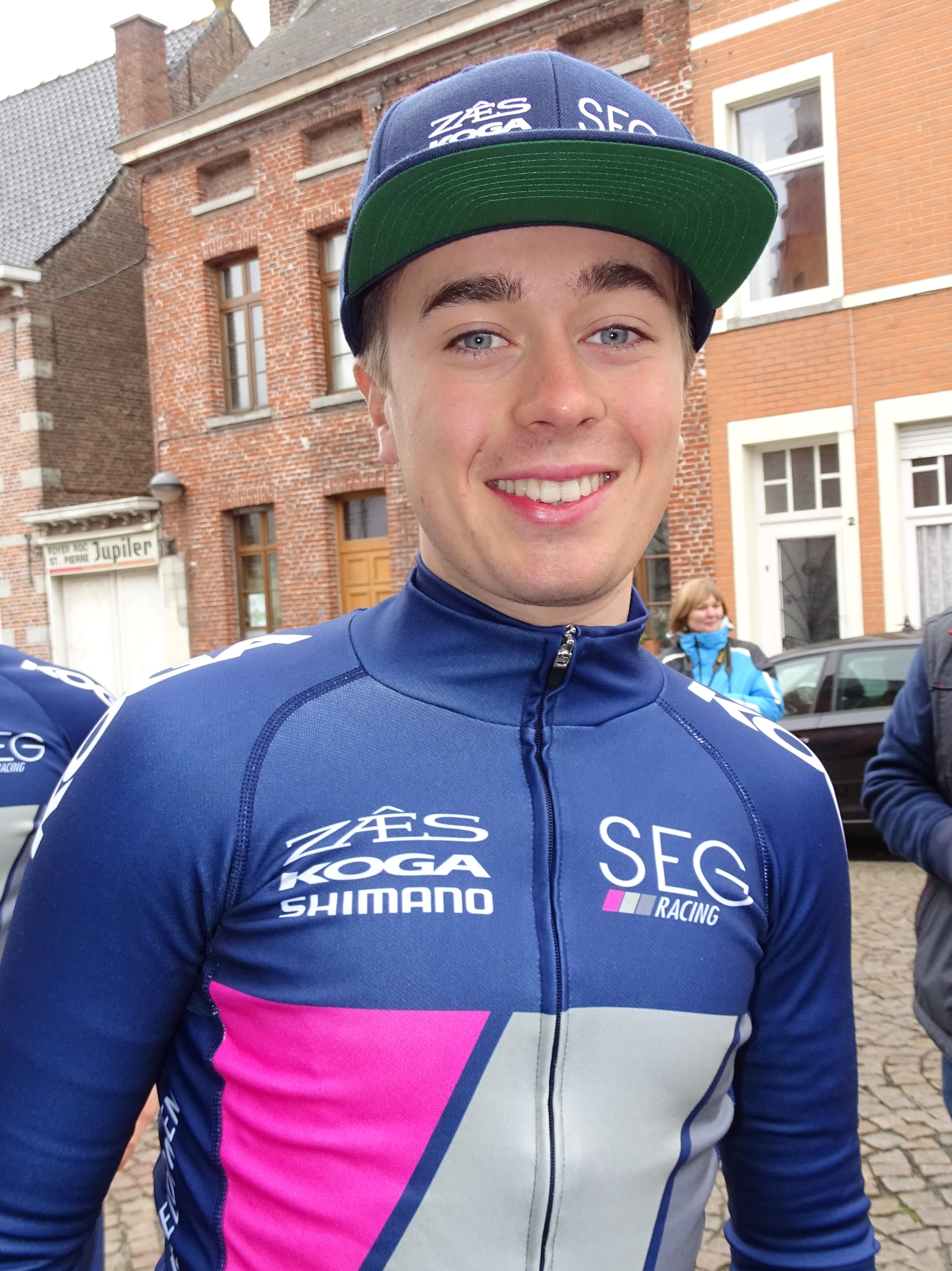
- Klaris in 2015.

Personal information
- Full name: Magnus Bak Klaris
- Born: 23 January 1996 (age 30) Copenhagen, Denmark

Cycling career
- Sport: Cycling
- Current team: Airtox–Carl Ras
- Disciplines: Road; Gravel
- Role: Rider

Amateur team
- 2020–2021: Team Synch–Giant

Professional teams
- 2015–2016: SEG Racing
- 2017: Team ColoQuick–Cult
- 2018–2019: BHS–Almeborg Bornholm
- 2022–: Restaurant Suri–Carl Ras

Magnus Bak Klaris (born 23 January 1996) is a Danish road cyclist, who rides for UCI Continental team Airtox–Carl Ras. He previously rode professionally between 2015 and 2019 for the SEG Racing Academy, Team ColoQuick–Cult and BHS–Almeborg Bornholm teams.

== Major results ==
=== Road ===
2013
2nd Time trial, National Junior Championships
2014
1st Overall Peace Race Juniors

1st Points classification

1st Paris–Roubaix Juniors
1st Stage 5 Grand Prix Rüebliland
5th Road race, UCI Junior World Championships
2015
7th GP Horsens
2016
5th Rytgerløbet
2017
9th Overall Ronde van Midden-Nederland
2018
1st Stage 4 (TTT) Tour de l'Avenir
3rd GP Horsens
2021
2nd GP Herning
2022
1st Lillehammer GP
7th Arno Wallaard Memorial
7th Ringerike GP
2023
1st Overall Randers Bike Week

1st Stages 3 & 4

2nd Road race, National Championships
5th Gylne Gutuer
10th Overall Danmark Rundt
10th Overall Olympia's Tour
10th Overall Tour of Malopolska
10th Lillehammer GP
2024
2nd Memoriał Andrzeja Trochanowskiego
4th Overall Tour of Istanbul
5th Overall Tour of Malopolska
6th Arno Wallaard Memorial
2025
5th Sundvolden GP
6th Overall Tour of Rhodes

=== Gravel ===
2023
1st National Championships
2024
5th European Championships
2025
UCI World Series

1st Wörthersee
2nd Turnhout

1st Overall Santa Vall

1st Stages 1 & 2

1st The Rift

2026
1st Halmstad
1st UCI World Championships
