= Emil Vinjebo =

Danish cyclist (born 1994)

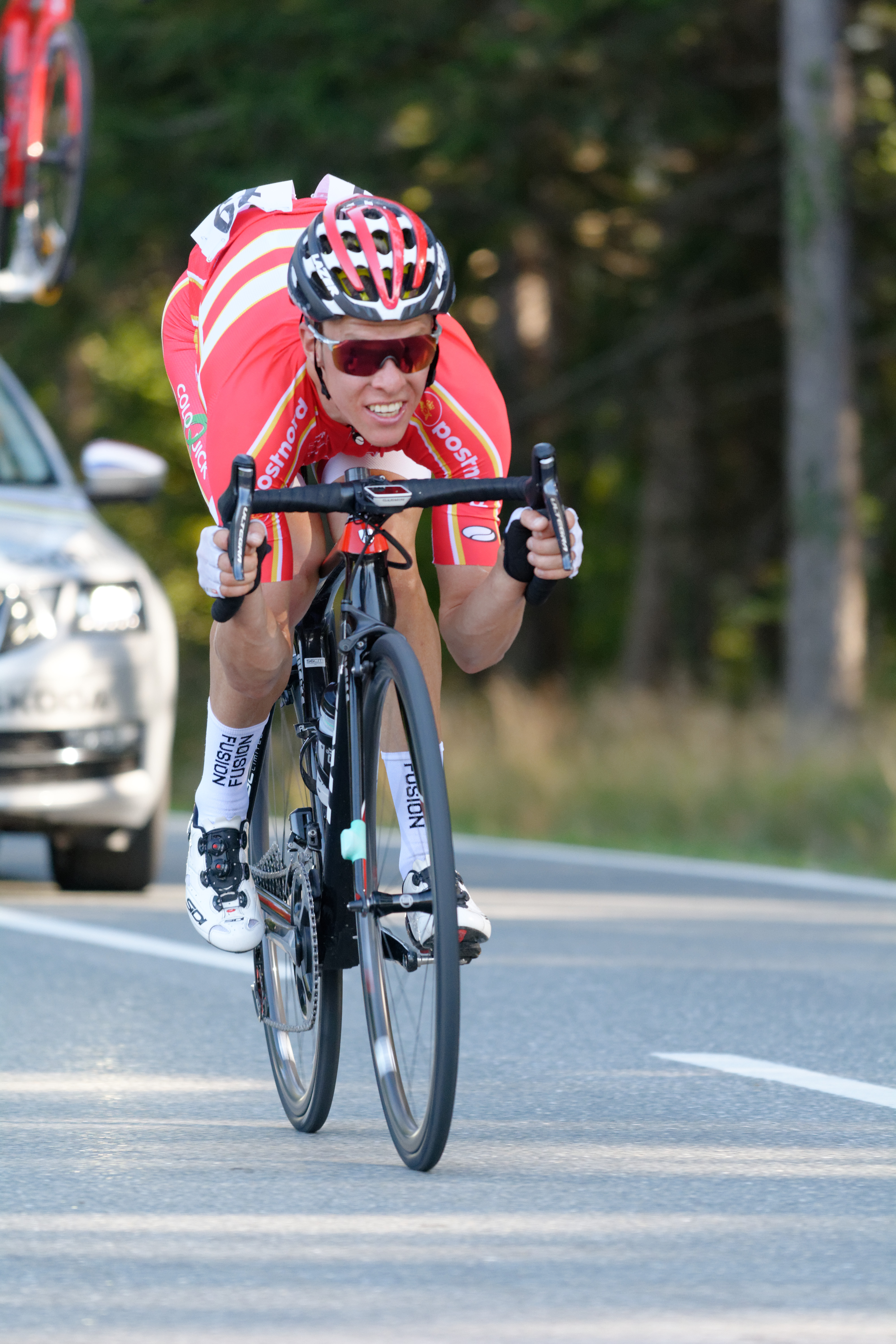
- Vinjebo in 2018

Personal information
- Full name: Emil Nygaard Vinjebo
- Born: 24 March 1994 (age 32) Gadstrup, Denmark
- Height: 1.81 m (5 ft 11 in)
- Weight: 67 kg (148 lb)

Cycling career
- Sport: Cycling
- Current team: Retired
- Discipline: Road
- Role: Rider

Professional teams
- 2013: Team TreFor
- 2014: Cult Energy–Vital Water
- 2015: Team TreFor–Blue Water
- 2016–2017: Team Giant Scatto
- 2018: Team ColoQuick
- 2019–2020: Riwal Readynez
- 2021: Team Qhubeka Assos
- 2022: Riwal Cycling Team
- 2023: Leopard TOGT Pro Cycling

Emil Nygaard Vinjebo (born 24 March 1994) is a Danish former cyclist, who competed as a professional from 2013 to 2023.

== Major results ==
2011
5th Overall Regio-Tour
9th Overall Liège–La Gleize
2012
1st Stage 1 (TTT) Regio-Tour
4th Overall Tour du Pays de Vaud
10th Overall Grand Prix Rüebliland
2016
4th Paris–Chauny
6th GP Viborg
9th Gran Premio Sportivi di Poggiana
2017
2nd Overall Okolo Jižních Čech
2018
2nd Overall Tour du Loir-et-Cher

1st Stage 4

2nd Himmerland Rundt
2nd Duo Normand (with Casper von Folsach)
4th Lillehammer GP
5th Gylne Gutuer
6th Overall Tour of Denmark
6th Hafjell GP
7th Overall Tour de Normandie
10th GP Horsens
2019
3rd Tro-Bro Léon
4th La Drôme Classic
4th Fyen Rundt
2023
5th Overall Olympia's Tour
