= 2025 Tudor Pro Cycling Team season =

Swiss cycling team season

Tudor Pro Cycling Team
- 2025 season
- UCI code: TUD
- Status: UCI ProTeam
- Manager: Raphael Meyer (SUI)
- Based: Switzerland
- Bicycles: BMC
- Groupset: SRAM

Season victories
- One-day races: 3
- Stage race overall: 1
- Stage race stages: 1
- Most wins: (Switzerland) Marc Hirschi (Netherlands) Rick Pluimers (Australia) Michael Storer (Germany) Florian Stork (1 win each)

The 2025 season for the Tudor Pro Cycling Team team is the team's 7th season in existence, and its 3rd season as a UCI ProTeam.

== Team roster ==
As of 6 January 2025.

Rider	Date of birth
Julian Alaphilippe (FRA)	11 June 1992 (aged 32)
Marco Brenner (GER)	27 August 2002 (aged 22)
Alberto Dainese (ITA)	25 March 1998 (aged 26)
Arvid de Kleijn (NED)	21 March 1994 (aged 30)
Jacob Eriksson (SWE)	1 October 1999 (aged 25)
Lucas Eriksson (SWE)	10 April 1996 (aged 28)
Robin Froidevaux (SUI)	17 October 1998 (aged 26)
Marco Haller (AUT)	1 April 1991 (aged 33)
Miká Heming (GER)	6 April 2000 (aged 24)
Marc Hirschi (SUI)	24 August 1998 (aged 26)
Petr Kelemen (CZE)	18 November 2000 (aged 24)
Arthur Kluckers (LUX)	15 March 2000 (aged 24)
Sebastian Kolze Changizi (DEN)	29 December 2000 (aged 24)
Alexander Krieger (GER)	28 November 1991 (aged 33)
Fabian Lienhard (SUI)	3 September 1993 (aged 31)

Rider	Date of birth
Marius Mayrhofer (GER)	18 September 2000 (aged 24)
Aivaras Mikutis (LIT)	16 September 2002 (aged 22)
Rick Pluimers (NED)	7 December 2000 (aged 24)
Mathys Rondel (FRA)	23 September 2003 (aged 21)
Michael Storer (AUS)	28 February 1997 (aged 27)
Florian Stork (GER)	27 April 1997 (aged 27)
Joel Suter (SUI)	25 October 1998 (aged 26)
Roland Thalmann (SUI)	5 August 1993 (aged 31)
Matteo Trentin (ITA)	2 August 1989 (aged 35)
Yannis Voisard (SUI)	26 July 1998 (aged 26)
Larry Warbasse (USA)	28 June 1990 (aged 34)
Fabian Weiss (SUI)	11 April 2002 (aged 22)
Hannes Wilksch (GER)	30 October 2001 (aged 23)
Luc Wirtgen (LUX)	7 July 1998 (aged 26)
Maikel Zijlaard (NED)	1 June 1999 (aged 25)

== Season victories ==
Date	Race	Competition	Rider	Country	Location	Ref.
26 January	Clàssica Comunitat Valenciana 1969 - Gran Premi València	UCI Europe Tour	Marc Hirschi (SWI)	Spain	La Nucia	
31 January	Trofeo Serra Tramuntana	UCI Europe Tour	Florian Stork (GER)	Spain	Selva	
7 February	Muscat Classic	UCI Asia Tour	Rick Pluimers (NED)	Oman	Al-Bustan	
22 April	Tour of the Alps, stage 2	UCI ProSeries	Michael Storer (AUS)	Italy	Sterzing	
22 April	Tour of the Alps, overall	UCI ProSeries	Michael Storer (AUS)	Italy	Sterzing	
