= Andreas Stokbro =

Danish cyclist (born 1997)

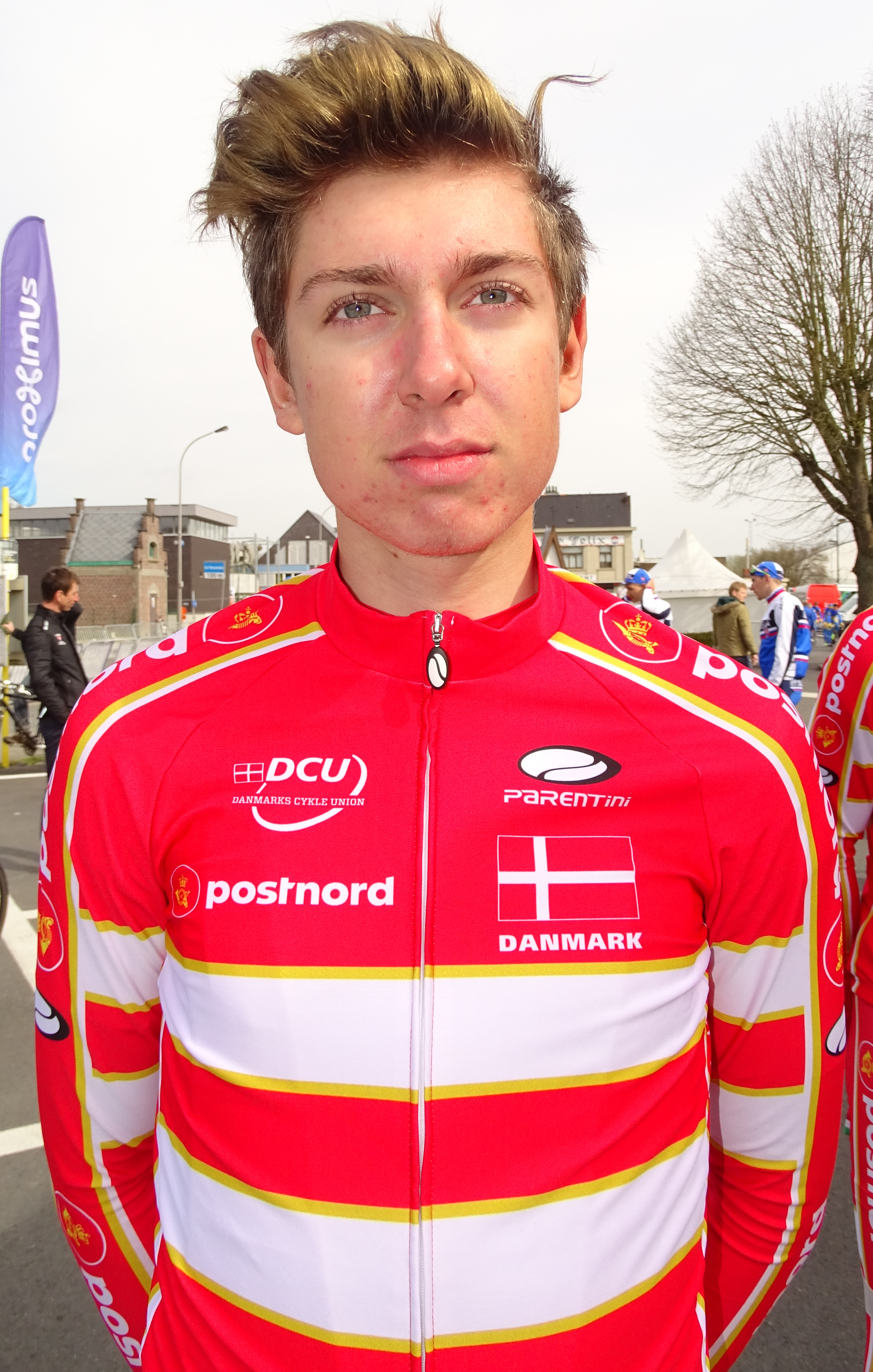
- Stokbro in 2016.

Personal information
- Full name: Andreas Stokbro Nielsen
- Born: 8 April 1997 (age 29) Brøndby, Denmark
- Height: 1.83 m (6 ft 0 in)
- Weight: 70 kg (154 lb)

Cycling career
- Sport: Cycling
- Current team: Team ColoQuick
- Discipline: Road
- Role: Rider

Professional teams
- 2016–2019: Riwal Platform
- 2020–2021: NTT Pro Cycling
- 2022: Team Coop
- 2023: Leopard TOGT Pro Cycling
- 2024–2025: TDT–Unibet Cycling Team
- 2026–: Team ColoQuick

Andreas Stokbro Nielsen (born 8 April 1997) is a Danish cyclist, who currently rides for UCI Continental team Team ColoQuick. He previously competed for UCI WorldTeam NTT Pro Cycling for the 2020 and 2021 seasons.

== Major results ==
=== Road ===
2015
1st Stage 2b Trofeo Karlsberg
4th Overall Grand Prix Rüebliland

1st Points classification

8th Trofeo Citta di Loano
8th Ronde van Vlaanderen Juniors
9th Kuurne-Brussel-Kuurne Juniors
2016
3rd Road race, National Under-23 Road Championships
5th Overall ZLM Tour

1st Stage 3

2017
2nd Road race, National Under-23 Road Championships
4th Himmerland Rundt
4th Fyen Rundt
5th Ronde van Overijssel
2018
1st Stage 4 (TTT) Tour de l'Avenir
2nd Overall Tour of Estonia

1st Stage 2
1st Points classification
1st Young rider classification

2nd Skive-Løbet
2nd Lillehammer GP
National Under-23 Road Championships

3rd Road race
3rd Time trial

4th Grand Prix Herning
5th Ronde van Vlaanderen Beloften
5th Road race, National Road Championships
2019
1st Ronde van Vlaanderen Beloften
1st Grand Prix Herning
4th Road race, National Road Championships
5th Ringerike GP
5th Grote Prijs Marcel Kint
5th Hansa Bygg Kalmar Grand Prix Road Race
2022
1st Grand Prix Herning
Oberösterreich Rundfahrt

1st Mountains classification
1st Stage 1

1st Stage 2 Tour du Loir-et-Cher
2nd Ringerike GP
2nd International Rhodes Grand Prix
2nd Gylne Gutuer
4th Road race, National Road Championships
7th Sundvolden GP
2023
1st Grand Prix de la Ville de Lillers
1st Gylne Gutuer
10th Le Samyn
2024
3rd Grand Prix Pino Cerami
2025
4th Cholet Agglo Tour

=== Gravel ===
2022
UCI Gravel World Series

1st Gravel One Fifty

10th UCI World Championships
