= Per Sandahl Jørgensen =

Danish cyclist (born 1953)

Personal information
- Full name: Per Sandahl Jørgensen
- Born: 2 August 1953 (age 73) Skive, Denmark

Cycling career
- Sport: Cycling
- Current team: Team ColoQuick
- Discipline: Road
- Role: Rider (retired); Directeur sportif

Managerial team
- 2017–: Team ColoQuick–Cult

Per Sandahl Jørgensen (born 2 August 1953) is a Danish former cyclist, who competed in the individual road race event at the 1980 Summer Olympics. He currently works as a directeur sportif for UCI Continental team Team ColoQuick.
