= Alexander Kamp =

Danish cyclist (born 1993)

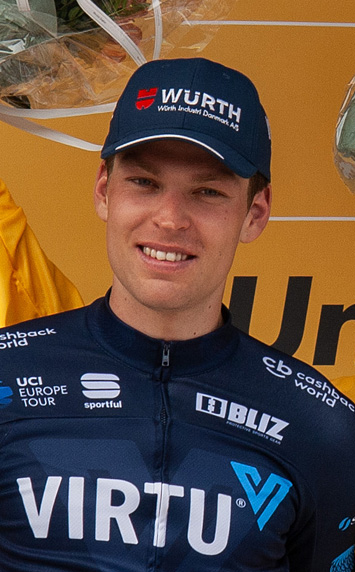
- Kamp at the 2018 Tour of Norway

Personal information
- Full name: Alexander Kamp Egested
- Born: 14 December 1993 (age 32) Copenhagen, Denmark
- Height: 1.86 m (6 ft 1 in)
- Weight: 74 kg (163 lb)

Cycling career
- Sport: Cycling
- Current team: Uno-X Mobility
- Discipline: Road
- Role: Rider

Professional teams
- 2012: Christina Watches–Onfone
- 2013: Team Cult Energy
- 2014: Christina Watches–Dana
- 2015: Team ColoQuick
- 2016: Stölting Service Group
- 2017–2018: Team VéloCONCEPT
- 2019: Riwal Readynez
- 2020–2022: Trek–Segafredo
- 2023–2024: Tudor Pro Cycling Team
- 2025: Intermarché–Wanty
- 2026–: Uno-X Mobility

Major wins
- One-day races and Classics National Road Race Championships (2016, 2022)

Alexander Kamp Egested (born 14 December 1993) is a Danish cyclist, who currently rides for UCI WorldTeam Uno-X Mobility.

== Major results ==
2010
1st Stage 2b Liège–La Gleize
7th Overall Trofeo Karlsberg
2011
1st Overall Driedaagse van Axel

1st Stage 3

1st Overall Liège–La Gleize

1st Stage 1

4th Overall Trofeo Karlsberg
2013
1st Grand Prix de la ville de Nogent-sur-Oise
2nd Road race, National Under-23 Road Championships
2015
1st Skive–Løbet
1st GP Horsens
2nd Fyen Rundt
3rd Road race, National Road Championships
5th Road race, UCI Road World Under-23 Championships
6th Dwars door Drenthe
7th Hadeland GP
7th Ringerike GP
8th Overall Flèche du Sud
9th Overall Danmark Rundt
2016 (1 pro win)
1st Road race, National Road Championships
1st GP Horsens
7th Overall Danmark Rundt
2017
1st Overall Tour du Loir-et-Cher

1st Points classification
1st Stage 4

1st Stage 3 International Tour of Rhodes
3rd Road race, National Road Championships
5th GP Viborg
2018 (1)
1st Sundvolden GP
1st Lillehammer GP
2nd Overall Tour of Norway

1st Stage 5

2nd Ringerike GP
6th Overall Tour du Loir-et-Cher
6th GP Horsens
2019 (1)
1st Overall Circuit des Ardennes

1st Stage 2

1st Points classification, Settimana Internazionale di Coppi e Bartali
4th Overall Tour de Yorkshire

1st Stage 3

8th Brabantse Pijl
2022 (1)
1st Road race, National Road Championships
3rd Bretagne Classic
5th Amstel Gold Race
2023 (1)
1st Overall Région Pays de la Loire Tour
5th Overall Tour of Norway
6th Brabantse Pijl
6th Overall Danmark Rundt
7th Grand Prix Cycliste de Québec
9th Amstel Gold Race
2026 (1)
2nd Overall Région Pays de la Loire Tour

1st Stage 3

2nd Bretagne Classic
10th Overall Danmark Rundt

=== Grand Tour general classification results timeline ===
Grand Tour	2020	2021	2022	2023	2024
Giro d'Italia	—	—	—	—	110
Tour de France	—	—	—	—	—
Vuelta a España	DNF	—	—	—	—

=== Classics results timeline ===
Monument	2019	2020	2021	2022	2023	2024	2025	2026
Milan–San Remo	—	—	—	—	—	161	—	—
Tour of Flanders	—	—	—	—	—	—	—	—
Paris–Roubaix	—	NH	—	—	—	—	—	—
Liège–Bastogne–Liège	—	63	39	—	—	—	DNF	96
Giro di Lombardia	—	—	—	—	—	—	—	
Classic	2019	2020	2021	2022	2023	2024	2025	2026
Strade Bianche	—	—	—	38	—	DNF	—	—
Brabantse Pijl	8	DNF	—	61	6	50	—	—
Amstel Gold Race	—	NH	DNF	5	9	27	18	61
La Flèche Wallonne	—	118	89	DNF	—	—	DNF	DNF
Bretagne Classic	—	68	—	3	49	—	—	2
Grand Prix Cycliste de Québec	—	Not held		15	7	57	41	
Grand Prix Cycliste de Montréal	—	Not held		57	41	DNF	27	

Legend
—	Did not compete
DNF	Did not finish
