= Mathias Bregnhøj =

Danish cyclist (born 1995)

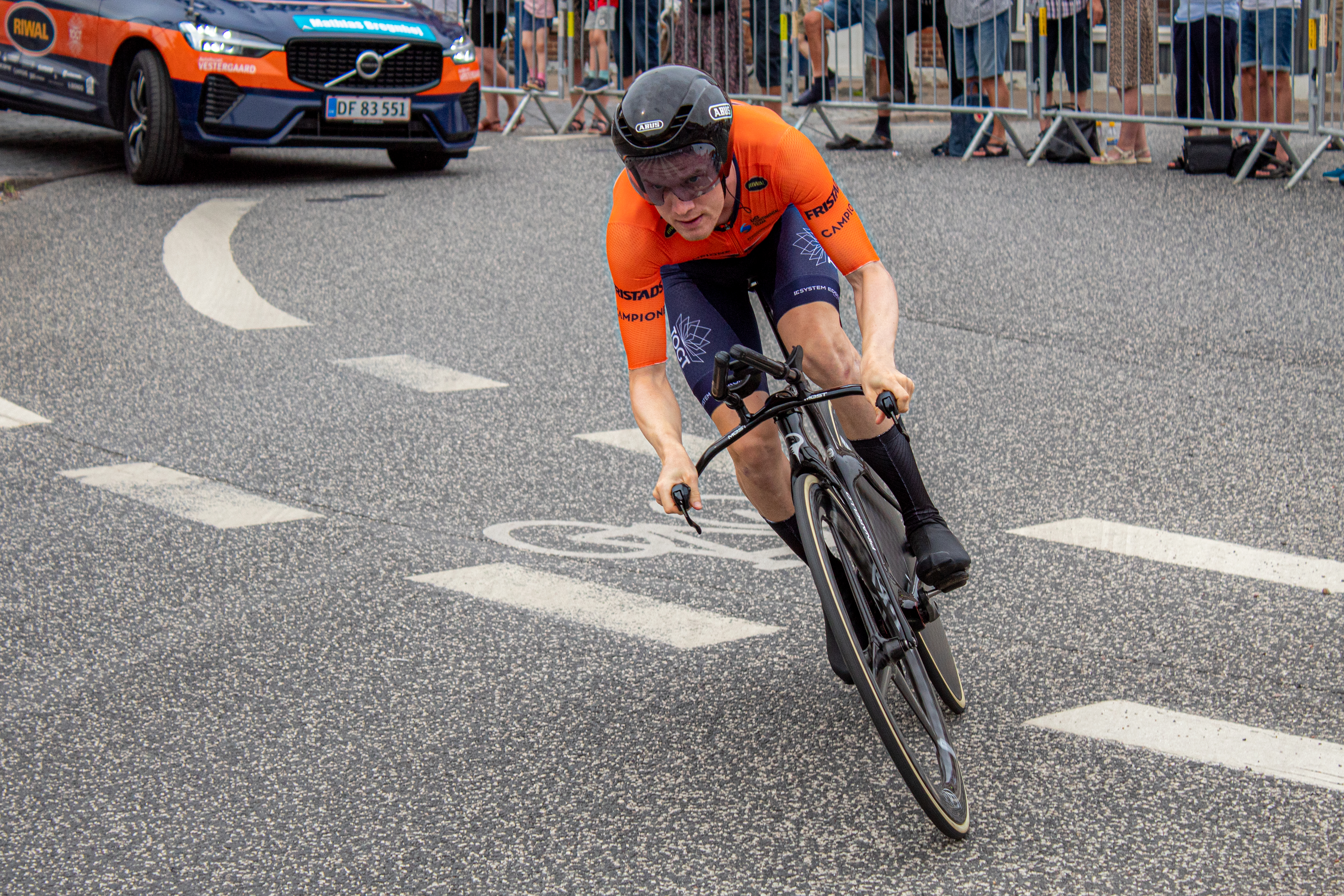
- Bregnhøj at the 2022 Danmark Rundt

Personal information
- Full name: Mathias Bjørn Bregnhøj
- Born: 11 November 1995 (age 30) Vejle, Denmark
- Height: 1.80 m (5 ft 11 in)
- Weight: 63 kg (139 lb)

Cycling career
- Sport: Cycling
- Current team: Terengganu Cycling Team
- Discipline: Road
- Role: Rider
- Rider type: Climber

Amateur teams
- 2008–2012: Vejle Cykel Klub
- 2013: Team Campus Vejle Middelfart
- 2014–2015: Odder Cykel Klub
- 2016: Herning Cykle Klub

Professional teams
- 2017–2021: BHS–Almeborg Bornholm
- 2022: Riwal Cycling Team
- 2023: Leopard TOGT Pro Cycling
- 2024: Sabgal–Anicolor
- 2025–: Terengganu Cycling Team

Mathias Bregnhøj (born 11 November 1995) is a Danish cyclist, who currently rides for UCI Continental team Terengganu Cycling Team.

== Major results ==
2020
1st Stage 1 Randers Bike Week
2022
3rd Sundvolden GP
5th Lillehammer GP
6th Gylne Gutuer
8th Overall Circuit des Ardennes
9th Ringerike GP
2023
1st Overall Circuit des Ardennes

1st Stage 2

1st Overall Olympia's Tour

1st Mountains classification

2nd Sundvolden GP
5th Road race, National Road Championships
6th Lillehammer GP
7th Overall Flèche du Sud

1st Stage 2

8th Overall Danmark Rundt
10th Volta Limburg Classic
2024
2nd Overall Circuit des Ardennes
3rd Clássica da Arrábida
8th Overall Tour of Britain
2025
1st Overall Tour of Route Salvation

1st, Stages 1 & 2

2nd Overall Tour de Kumano
3rd Overall Tour of Mersin
5th Overall Tour of Japan
2026
8th Overall Tour de Langkawi
