= Kasper Andersen (cyclist) =

Danish cyclist

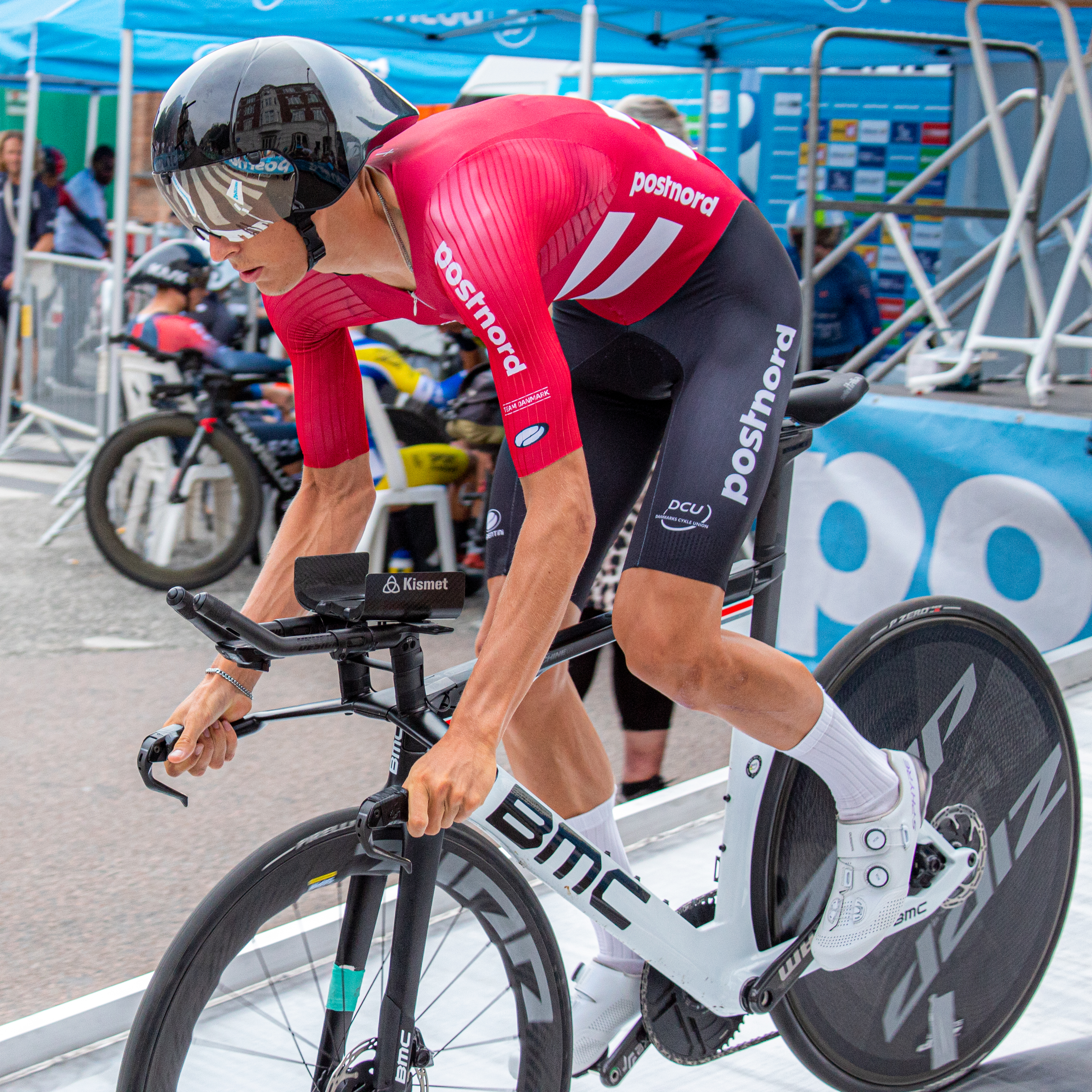
- Andersen in 2022

Personal information
- Born: July 1, 2002 (age 24) Bagsværd, Denmark
- Height: 1.82 m (6 ft 0 in)

Cycling career
- Sport: Cycling
- Current team: Swatt Club
- Discipline: Road
- Role: Rider
- Rider type: Sprinter

Amateur teams
- 2019–2020: NPV–Carl Ras Roskilde Junior
- 2025: Swatt Club

Professional teams
- 2021: Team ColoQuick
- 2022–2024: Hagens Berman Axeon
- 2022: UAE Team Emirates (stagiaire)
- 2026–: Swatt Club
Medal record
Road cycling
Representing Denmark
European Junior Championships
Gold medal – first place	2020 Plouay	Road race

Kasper Andersen (born 1 July 2002) is a Danish professional road cyclist, who currently rides for UCI Continental team Hagens Berman Jayco.

== Major results ==
2019
9th Overall Saarland Trofeo
2020
1st Road race, UEC European Junior Road Championships
9th Overall Grand Prix Rüebliland
2021
3rd Fyen Rundt
2022
10th Overall International Tour of Rhodes
2025
1st Giro della Provincia di Biella
3rd Gran Premio New York City
5th Overall Okolo Jižních Čech
6th Overall Tour de Banyuwangi Ijen
6th Trofeo Alcide De Gasperi
7th Overall Tour of Rhodes
2026
6th Giro della Provincia di Biella
