= Mads Andersen (cyclist) =

Danish cyclist (born 2000)

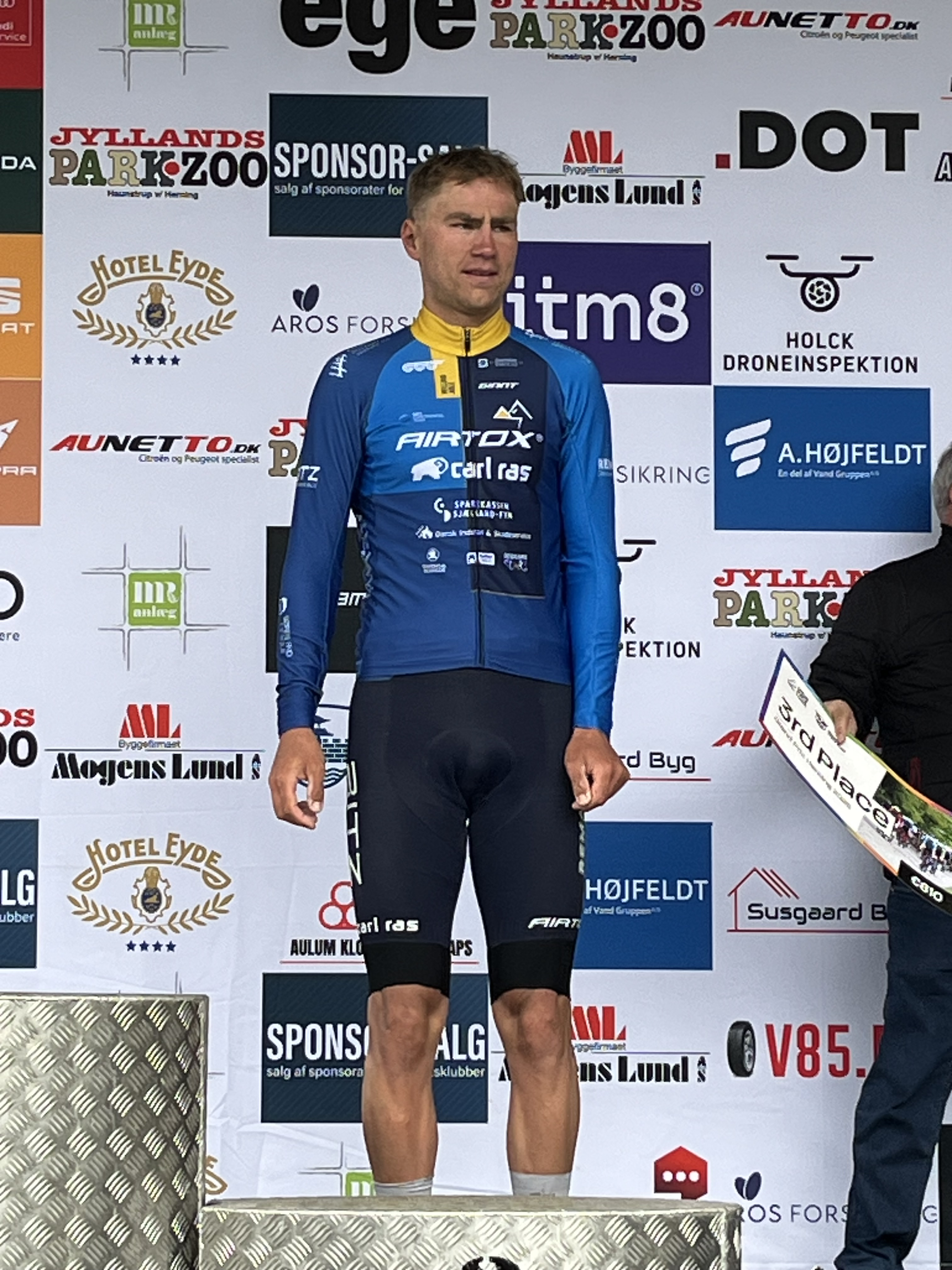
- Andersen in 2025

Personal information
- Born: 27 November 2000 (age 25) Odense, Denmark

Cycling career
- Sport: Cycling
- Current team: Airtox–Carl Ras
- Discipline: Road
- Role: Rider

Amateur teams
- 2017–2018: Team Vifra Kvickly Odder Junior
- 2019: Team OK Kvickly Odder
- 2020: Team Herning CK Elite

Professional teams
- 2021–2023: Team ColoQuick–Cult
- 2024–: Airtox–Carl Ras

Mads Andersen (born 27 November 2000) is a Danish cyclist, who currently rides for UCI Continental team Airtox–Carl Ras.

== Major results ==
2020
2nd Overall Randers Bike Week

1st Stage 4

2021
4th Road race, National Under-23 Road Championships
2022
1st Stage 1 (TTT) Kreiz Breizh Elites
3rd Time trial, National Under-23 Road Championships
2023
1st Stage 1 (ITT) Randers Bike Week
7th Grand Prix Herning
2024
1st Overall Tour of Lithuania

1st Points classification
1st Stage 2

1st Stage 1 (ITT) Randers Bike Week
2nd Overall Dookoła Mazowsza

1st Stage 1

10th Famenne Ardenne Classic
2025
1st Grote Prijs Rik Van Looy
1st Giro Himledalen
3rd Grand Prix Herning
4th Overall Tour of Estonia
5th Overall Olympia's Tour
2026
1st Overall Olympia's Tour
1st Fyen Rundt
7th Grand Prix Herning
