= GP Horsens =

Danish one-day road cycling race

Race details
- Date: June
- Region: Denmark
- Discipline: Road
- Competition: UCI Europe Tour (2015–18)
- Type: One day race
- Web site: rundtomhorsens.dk

History
- First edition: 2015
- Editions: 5 (as of 2022)
- First winner: Alexander Kamp (DEN)
- Most wins: Alexander Kamp (DEN) (2 wins)
- Most recent: Sebastian Nielsen (DEN)

The GP Horsens is an annual one day cycling race held near Horsens, Denmark. It was previously part of the UCI Europe Tour, as a category 1.2 race.

== Winners ==
Year	Country	Rider	Team
2015	Denmark	Alexander Kamp	Team ColoQuick
2016	Denmark	Alexander Kamp	Stölting Service Group
2017	Denmark	Casper Pedersen	Team Giant–Castelli
2018	Norway	Herman Dahl	Joker Icopal
2019– 2021	No race		
2022	Denmark	Sebastian Nielsen	Restaurant Suri–Carl Ras
