= Grote Prijs Rik Van Looy =

Belgian cycling race

Race details
- Date: September
- Region: Herentals, Antwerp (Belgium)
- English name: Grand Prize Rik Van Looy
- Discipline: Road
- Competition: 1.2
- Type: One-day race
- Web site: gprikvanlooy.be

History
- First edition: 2018
- Editions: 8
- First winner: Brent Van Moer (BEL)
- Most recent: Daan Depuydt (BEL)

The Grand Prix Rik Van Looy (Dutch: Grote Prijs Rik Van Looy) is a men's cycle race held between Westerlo and Herentals, in the province of Antwerp, Belgium.

It is organized in tribute to the Hall of Fame cycling champion Rik Van Looy, born in 1933 and nicknamed the Emperor of Herentals. Its first edition took place in 2018 and was reserved for riders under 23 years old. Since 2022, it has been run by professionals and is part of the UCI Europe Tour, in category 1.2. In 2023, the starting place was changed from Grobbendonk (Van Looy's birth place) to Westerlo and the race distance was 176.8 km. The finish is on the Grote Markt (Grand Place) in Herentals, close to the statue of Van Looy.

Rik Van Looy himself always gave the starting signal for the race until 2024. He died about three months after that edition.

== Winners ==
Year	Winner	Second	Third
2018	(Belgium) Brent Van Moer	(Netherlands) Niels Boele	(Belgium) Jelle Schuermans
2019	(Belgium) Viktor Verschaeve	(Belgium) Lennert Teugels	(Belgium) Thomas Vereecken
2020	No race due to the COVID-19 pandemic		
2021	(Belgium) Louis Blouwe	(Belgium) Cériel Desal	(Belgium) Luca De Meester
2022	(Netherlands) Coen Vermeltfoort	(Denmark) Rasmus Bøgh Wallin	(Norway) Sebastian Kirkedam Larsen
2023	(Denmark) Rasmus Bøgh Wallin	(Belgium) Gianluca Pollefliet	(Belgium) Pieter Van Laer
2024	(Belgium) Simon Dehairs	(Belgium) Davide Bomboi	(Germany) Tim Torn Teutenberg
2025	(Denmark) Mads Andersen	(Germany) Tobias Müller	(Spain) Manuel Peñalver
2026	(Belgium) Daan Depuydt	(Belgium) Timo Kielich	(Belgium) Tuur Verbeeck
