= Tour of Lithuania =

Road bicycle racing stage race held in Lithuania

Race details
- Date: June
- Region: Lithuania
- Discipline: Road
- Competition: UCI Europe Tour
- Type: Stage race

History
- First edition: 2024
- Editions: 3 (as of 2026)
- First winner: Mads Andersen (DEN)
- Most wins: No repeat winners
- Most recent: Alexander Konychev (ITA)

The Tour of Lithuania is a road bicycle racing stage race held annually in Lithuania. The race is organized as a 2.2 category event on the UCI Europe Tour, and was first held in 2024. It takes place in early June and consists of five stages.

== Winners ==
Year	Country	Rider	Team
2024	Denmark	Mads Andersen	Airtox–Carl Ras
2025	Estonia	Martin Laas	Quick Pro Team
2026	Italy	Alexander Konychev	China Anta–Mentech Cycling Team
