= Sebastian Kolze Changizi =

Danish cyclist (born 2000)

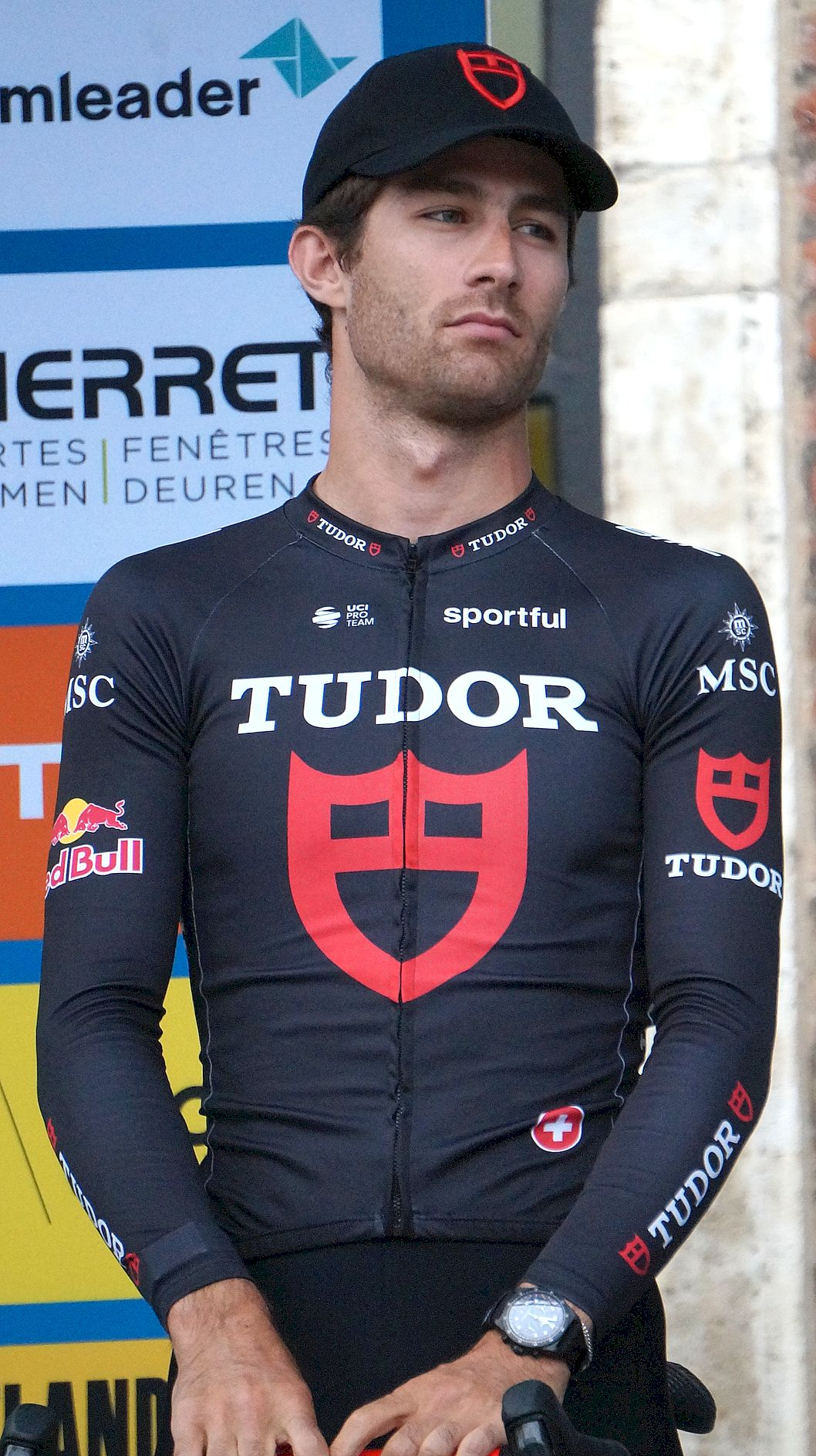
- Changizi in 2026

Personal information
- Born: 29 December 2000 (age 25) Silkeborg, Denmark
- Height: 1.81 m (5 ft 11 in)

Cycling career
- Sport: Cycling
- Current team: Tudor Pro Cycling Team
- Discipline: Road
- Role: Rider

Amateur teams
- 2012–2016: Silkeborg IF Cykling
- 2017–2018: Team Mascot Workwear
- 2019: Team AURA Energi–CK Aarhus

Professional teams
- 2020–2022: Team ColoQuick
- 2022: Cofidis (stagiaire)
- 2023–: Tudor Pro Cycling Team

Sebastian Kolze Changizi (born 29 December 2000) is a Danish racing cyclist, who currently rides for UCI ProTeam Tudor Pro Cycling Team.

== Major results ==
2018
1st Stage 2 Coupe du Président de la Ville de Grudziądz
2nd Road race, National Junior Road Championships
2022
1st Stage 1 Course de la Paix U23 – Grand Prix Jeseníky
1st Stage 4 Flèche du Sud
1st Stage 1 (TTT) Kreiz Breizh Elites
2nd Road race, National Under-23 Road Championships
2nd Gent–Wevelgem U23
3rd Fyen Rundt
7th Grand Prix Herning
2025
10th Grand Prix Criquielion
