= Kalmar Grand Prix =

Swedish road cycling race

Race details
- Date: August
- Region: Kalmar, Sweden
- Discipline: Road
- Competition: UCI Europe Tour
- Type: Single-day
- Web site: kalmargrandprix.se

History
- First edition: 2017
- Editions: 3 (as of 2019)
- First winner: Rasmus Bøgh Wallin (DEN)
- Most wins: No repeat winners
- Most recent: Gustav Höög (SWE)

The Hansa Bygg Kalmar Grand Prix is a single-day road cycling race held annually in Sweden since 2017. It is part of UCI Europe Tour in category 1.2.

== Winners ==
Year	Country	Rider	Team
2017	Denmark	Rasmus Bøgh Wallin	Team ColoQuick–Cult
2018	Sweden	Gustav Höög	Team Coop
2019	Estonia	Norman Vahtra	Klubi Cycling Tartu
