= William Smith (cyclist, born 2004) =

British cyclist (born 2004)

Personal information
- Born: 21 March 2004 (age 22) Hillingdon, England

Cycling career
- Sport: Cycling
- Current team: Visma–Lease a Bike Development
- Discipline: Road
- Role: Rider

Amateur team
- 2021–2022: Zappi Junior Race Team

Professional teams
- 2023–2024: Trinity Racing
- 2025–: Visma–Lease a Bike Development

William Smith (born 21 March 2004) is a British professional cyclist who rides for UCI Continental team Visma–Lease a Bike Development.

== Career ==
From St Albans, Smith raced in Great Britain for Verulam Reallymoving and Oaklands Wolves before joining Trinity Racing. In 2024, he had a tenth-place finish in the Liege-Bastogne-Liege U23 race and a second place in the mountain's classification at the Ronde de l'Isard. He then placed 35th overall in the Giro Next Gen stage race. He signed for Visma–Lease a Bike Development in 2024.

In 2025, he won the overall classification at the Tour of South Bohemia, also winning a stage and the best young rider competition.

== Major results ==
2021
9th Overall Junior Tour of Wales

1st Young rider classification

2022
1st Overall Bizkaiko Itzulia

1st Mountains classification
1st Stage 2

1st Menin–Kemmel–Menin
2024
10th Liège–Bastogne–Liège U23
2025
1st Overall Okolo Jižních Čech

1st Young rider classification
1st Stage 3

1st Mountains classification, Istrian Spring Tour
6th Overall Tour Alsace
