= Rasmus Bøgh Wallin =

Danish cyclist (born 1996)

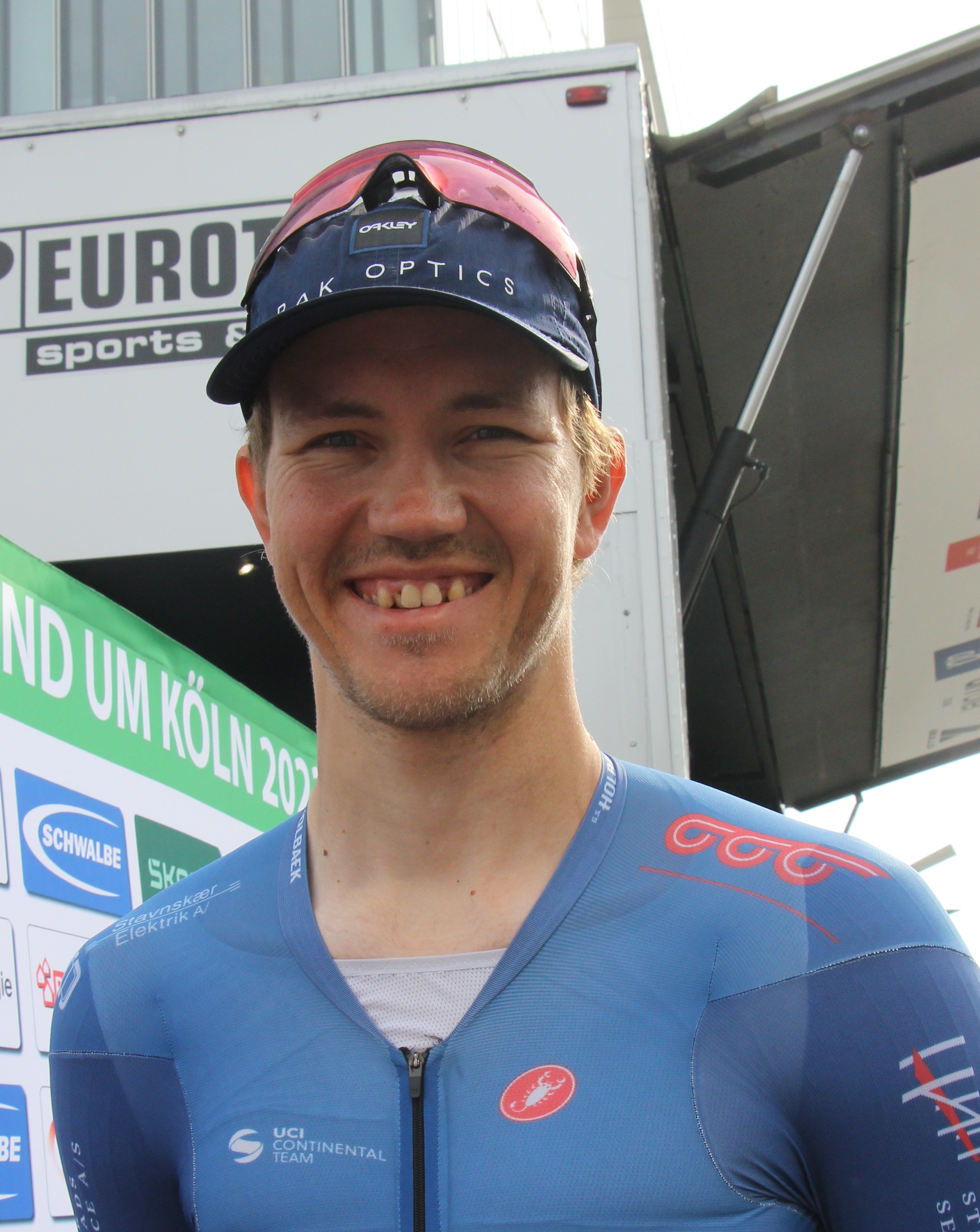
- Wallin in 2023.

Personal information
- Full name: Rasmus Bøgh Wallin
- Born: 2 January 1996 (age 30) Hellerup, Denmark
- Height: 1.95 m (6 ft 5 in)
- Weight: 78 kg (172 lb)

Cycling career
- Sport: Cycling
- Current team: Uno-X Mobility
- Discipline: Road
- Role: Rider

Amateur team
- 2020–2021: Team Synch–Giant

Professional teams
- 2016: Team Soigneur–Copenhagen
- 2017–2018: Team ColoQuick–Cult
- 2019–2020: Riwal Readynez
- 2022–2023: Restaurant Suri–Carl Ras
- 2024–: Uno-X Mobility

Rasmus Bøgh Wallin (born 2 January 1996) is a Danish cyclist, who currently rides for UCI ProTeam Uno-X Mobility.

== Major results ==
2014
3rd Road race, National Junior Road Championships
2016
3rd Time trial, National Under–23 Road Championships
2017
1st Kalmar Grand Prix
5th ZLM Tour
6th Overall Ronde van Midden-Nederland
8th Skive–Løbet
2018
1st Skive–Løbet
3rd Ronde van Midden-Nederland
4th Omloop Mandel-Leie-Schelde
6th Overall Olympia's Tour
2019
1st Scandinavian Race in Uppsala
4th Skive–Løbet
5th Grand Prix Herning
2021
Danmark Rundt

1st Mountains classification
1st Active rider classification

2nd Fyen Rundt
3rd Himmerland Rundt
2022
1st Overall Okolo Jižních Čech

1st Stages 1 & 4

Danmark Rundt

1st Mountains classification
1st Active rider classification

1st Scandinavian Race in Uppsala
2nd Grote Prijs Rik Van Looy
4th Arno Wallaard Memorial
2023
1st Overall Tour of Estonia

1st Points classification
1st Stage 2

1st Arno Wallaard Memorial
1st Grote Prijs Rik Van Looy
1st Tour de Charlottenlund
1st Stage 1 Visit South Aegean Islands
1st Stage 2 Randers Bike Week
2nd Grand Prix Herning
2nd International Rhodes Grand Prix
2nd Gylne Gutuer
3rd Ringerike GP
2025
2nd Antwerp Port Epic
