= Okolo Jižních Čech =

Czech multi-day road cycling race

Race details
- Date: September
- Region: Czech Republic
- Discipline: Road race
- Competition: UCI Europe Tour
- Type: Stage race
- Web site: www.okolojiznichcech.cz/index.php/en/home/

History
- First edition: 2012
- Editions: 12 (as of 2026)
- First winner: Jiří Hochmann (CZE)
- Most wins: No repeat winners
- Most recent: Mateusz Gajdulewicz (POL)

The Okolo Jižních Čech (meaning "Around South Bohemia") is a multi-day road cycling race that has been held annually in the Czech Republic since 2012. It is part of the UCI Europe Tour in category 2.2.

== Winners ==
| Year | Country | Rider | Team |
|---|---|---|---|
| 2012 | Czech Republic | Jiří Hochmann | ASC Dukla Praha |
| 2013 | France | Florian Sénéchal | Etixx–IHNed |
| 2014 | Norway | Reidar Borgersen | Team Joker |
| 2015 | France | Alexis Guérin | AWT–GreenWay |
| 2016 | No race | | |
| 2017 | Czech Republic | Josef Černý | Elkov–Author |
| 2018 | Czech Republic | Michael Kukrle | Elkov–Author |
| 2019 | No race | | |
| 2020 | No race | | |
| 2021 | Belgium | Arnaud de Lie | Lotto–Soudal U23 |
| 2022 | Denmark | Rasmus Bøgh Wallin | Restaurant Suri–Carl Ras |
| 2023 | Norway | Martin Solhaug Hansen | Uno-X Dare Development Team |
| 2024 | Poland | Marcin Budziński | Mazowsze Serce Polski |
| 2025 | Great Britain | William Smith | Visma–Lease a Bike Development |
| 2026 | Poland | Mateusz Gajdulewicz | ATT Investments |
