= Airtox–Carl Ras =

Danish cycling team

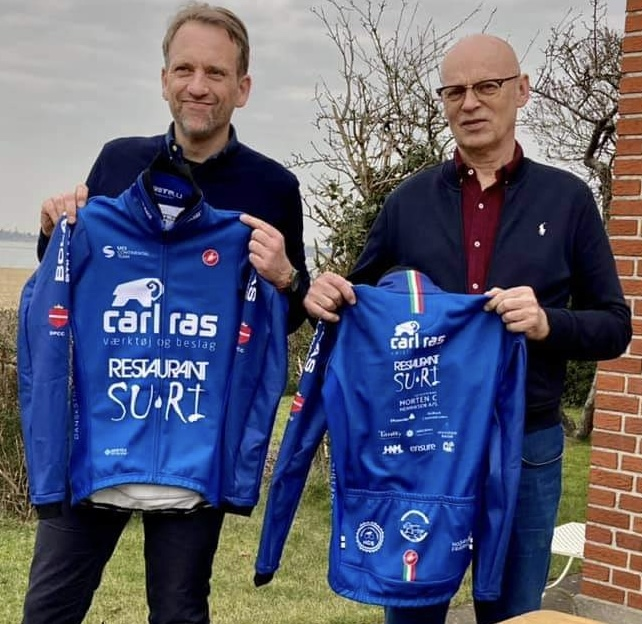
- The team jersey

Team information
- UCI code: GSH
- Registered: Denmark
- Founded: 2019
- Discipline: Road
- Status: Amateur (2019–2020); UCI Continental (2021–)

Key personnel
- General manager: Henrik Egholm
- Team manager: Nicolaj Bo Larsen

Team name history
- 2019 2020 2021–2023 2024–: Holbæk Cykelsport; Eiland Electric–Carl Ras; Restaurant Suri–Carl Ras; Airtox–Carl Ras

Airtox–Carl Ras is a Danish UCI Continental team founded in 2019.

The team is owned by professional cyclist Mads Pedersen, former professional cyclist Brian Holm, Jan Bech Andersen and Henrik Egholm.

== Team roster ==
As of 3 September 2026.

Rider	Date of birth
Alexander Hansen (DEN)	13 May 2003 (age 23)
Magnus Klaris (DEN)	23 January 1996 (age 30)
Alfred Kongstad (DEN)	9 November 2005 (age 20)
Anton Louw Larsen (DEN)	24 June 2006 (age 20)
Oskar Louw Larsen (DEN)	27 December 2007 (age 18)
Nikolaj Mengel (DEN)	3 September 2002 (age 24)
Pelle Mikkelsen (DEN)	25 April 2003 (age 23)
Emil Nielsen (DEN)	13 April 2006 (age 20)

Rider	Date of birth
Thor Nielsen (DEN)	26 June 2006 (age 20)
Hugo Rishøj (DEN)	14 May 2006 (age 20)
Stian Rosenlund (DEN)	4 April 2002 (age 24)
Gustav Simonsen (DEN)	29 October 2001 (age 24)
Frederik Sørensen (DEN)	18 May 2003 (age 23)
Sylvester Stokbro (DEN)	16 July 2007 (age 19)
Benjamin Thestrup (DEN)	29 August 2007 (age 19)
Lucas Toftemark (DEN)	10 July 2004 (age 22)

== Major wins ==
2021
Himmerland Rundt, Mathias Larsen
2022
Overall Okolo Jižních Čech, Rasmus Bøgh Wallin

Stages 1 (ITT) & 4, Rasmus Bøgh Wallin

Lillehammer GP, Magnus Bak Klaris
Scandinavian Race in Uppsala, Rasmus Bøgh Wallin
2023
Overall Tour of Estonia, Rasmus Bøgh Wallin

Stage 2, Rasmus Bøgh Wallin

Arno Wallaard Memorial, Rasmus Bøgh Wallin
Stage 1 International Tour of Rhodes, Christian Ingemann Lindquist
Stage 2 Tour of Malopolska, Alexander Arnt Hansen
Stage 1 Visit South Aegean Islands, Rasmus Bøgh Wallin
2024
Overall Tour of Lithuania, Mads Andersen

Stage 1, Stian Rosenlund
Stage 2, Mads Andersen
Stage 3, Daniel Stampe

Overall Ronde van de Achterhoek, Stian Rosenlund
Stage 1 Dookoła Mazowsza, Mads Andersen
2025
Arno Wallaard Memorial, Stian Rosenlund
GP Rik van Looy, Mads Andersen
Stage 3 Tour of Malopolska, Nikolaj Mengel
Giro Himledalen, Mads Andersen
GP Herning, Stian Rosenlund
Stage 3 Olympia's Tour, Mathias Larsen
Stage 3 South Aegean Tour, Alexander Hansen
