= Lillehammer GP =

Annual road cycling race in Norway

Race details
- Date: September
- Region: Norway
- Discipline: Road
- Competition: UCI Europe Tour
- Type: single-day
- Organiser: Lillehammer Cykleklubb
- Web site: www.udw.no/lillehammer

History
- First edition: 2018
- Editions: 6 (as of 2023)
- First winner: Alexander Kamp (DEN)
- Most wins: No repeat winners
- Most recent: Christian Lindquist (DEN)

The Lillehammer GP is a single-day road cycling race held annually in Norway since 2018. It is part of UCI Europe Tour in category 1.2.

The race is part of the Uno - X Development Weekend, which takes place in late August and early September in the provinces of Hedmark and Oppland in Norway. It includes three races: the Hafjell GP, the Lillehammer GP and Gylne Gutuer.

== Winners ==
Year	Country	Rider	Team
2018	Denmark	Alexander Kamp	Team Waoo
2019	Denmark	Niklas Larsen	Team Waoo
2020	Norway	Andreas Leknessund	Uno-X Pro Cycling Team
2021	Norway	Idar Andersen	Uno-X Pro Cycling Team
2022	Denmark	Magnus Bak Klaris	Restaurant Suri–Carl Ras
2023	Denmark	Christian Lindquist	Restaurant Suri–Carl Ras
