= Team ColoQuick =

Danish cycling team

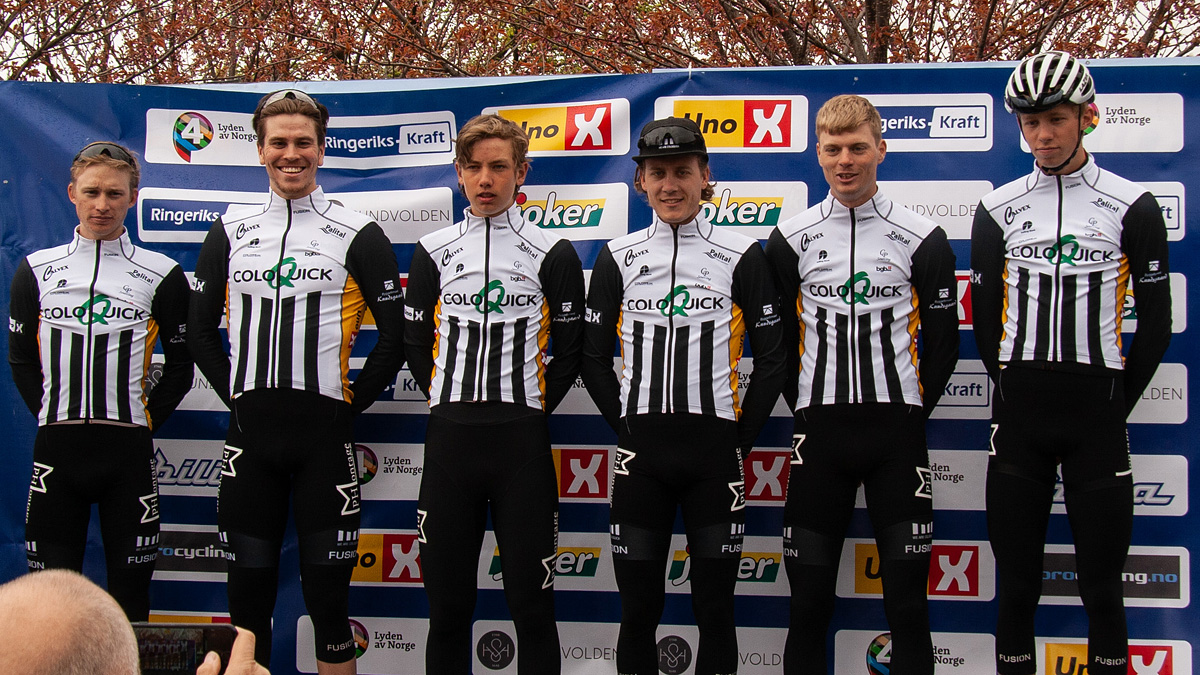

Team information
- UCI code: TCQ
- Registered: Denmark
- Founded: 2008
- Discipline: Road
- Status: UCI Continental

Key personnel
- General manager: Per Baadsgaard
- Team managers: Christian Jørgensen; Tonny Breiner; Michael Gregersen; Mads Hardahl; Brian Petersen; Per Sandahl Jørgensen

Team name history
- 2008–2009 2010 2012–2014 2015 2016–2017 2018–: Team Designa Køkken; Team Designa Køkken–Blue Water; Team Designa Køkken–Knudsgaard; ColoQuick; Team ColoQuick–Cult; Team ColoQuick

Team ColoQuick (UCI team code: TCQ) is a UCI Continental team founded in 2008 and based in Denmark. It participates in UCI Continental Circuits races.

== Team roster ==
As of 21 July 2024.

Rider	Date of birth
Simon Bak (DEN)	12 February 2000 (age 26)
Kevin Biehl (DEN)	8 January 2004 (age 22)
Joshua Gudnitz (DEN)	19 August 2001 (age 25)
Peter Øxenberg Hansen (DEN)	23 October 2005 (age 20)
Conrad Haugsted (DEN)	13 January 2005 (age 21)
Nikolaj Mengel (DEN)	9 March 2002 (age 24)
Pelle Køster Mikkelsen (DEN)	25 April 2003 (age 23)

Rider	Date of birth
Frederik Muff (DEN)	2 August 1993 (age 33)
Magnus Lorents Nielsen (DEN)	23 November 2003 (age 22)
Aksel Skot-Hansen (DEN)	11 June 2000 (age 26)
Tobias Svarre (DEN)	19 July 2004 (age 22)
Anders Vos Sørensen (DEN)	11 March 2004 (age 22)
Emil Toudal (DEN)	28 May 1996 (age 30)
Tore Troelsen (DEN)	17 June 2005 (age 21)

== Major wins ==
2008
Rogaland Grand Prix, Michael Tronborg
Prologue, Stages 2, 4 & 10, Tour of Qinghai Lake, Alex Rasmussen
Overall Danmark Rundt, Jakob Fuglsang
2009
Grand Prix de la Ville de Lillers, Aleksejs Saramotins
Overall Boucle de l'Artois, Sergey Firsanov

Stage 3 Sergey Firsanov

Stage 4 Rhône-Alpes Isère Tour, Allan Johansen
GP Herning, René Jørgensen
Overall Ringerike GP, Sergey Firsanov

Stage 2, Sergey Firsanov

Stage 3 Ronde de l'Oise, Aleksejs Saramotins
Stage 4 Ronde de l'Oise, Allan Johansen
Designa Grandprix, Aleksejs Saramotins
Antwerpse Havenpijl, Jens-Erik Madsen
Druivenkoers Overijse, Aleksejs Saramotins
Münsterland Giro, Aleksejs Saramotins
2010
Stage 6 La Tropicale Amissa Bongo, Michael Reihs
Overall Five Rings of Moscow, Sergey Firsanov

Stage 2, Sergey Firsanov

Fyen Rundt, Jens-Erik Madsen
Chrono Champenois, Rasmus Quaade
2015
Skive–Løbet, Alexander Kamp
GP Horsens, Alexander Kamp
Stage 5 (ITT) Danmark Rundt, Mads Würtz Schmidt
2017
Kalmar Grand Prix, Rasmus Bøgh Wallin
2018
Stage 4 Tour du Loir-et-Cher, Emil Vinjebo
Skive–Løbet, Rasmus Bøgh Wallin
2019
Stage 5 Tour du Loir-et-Cher, Steffan Munk
Eschborn–Frankfurt Under–23, Frederik Rodenberg
Himmerland Rundt, Niklas Larsen
Skive–Løbet, Frederik Rodenberg
Stage 1a Tour de la Mirabelle, Morten Hulgaard
Overall Danmark Rundt, Niklas Larsen
Lillehammer GP, Niklas Larsen
2021
GP Herning, Mads Kristensen
Gylne Gutuer, William Levy
2022
Stage 3 Tour du Loir-et-Cher, Jeppe Pallesen

== National champions ==
2009
Denmark U23 Time Trial, Jimmi Sørensen
2015
Denmark U23 Time Trial, Mads Würtz
2019
Denmark U23 Time Trial, Johan Price-Pejtersen
European U23 Time Trial, Johan Price-Pejtersen
