= 2016 Verva ActiveJet season =

Verva ActiveJet
- 2016 season
- UCI code: VAT
- Status: UCI Professional Continental
- Manager: Piotr Kosmala
- Based: Poland
- Bicycles: Trek

Season victories
- One-day races: 1
- Stage race stages: 3

The 2016 season for the Verva ActiveJet cycling team began in February with the Vuelta a Murcia. The team participated in UCI Europe Tour races and UCI World Tour events when given a wildcard invitation.

== Team roster ==
Rider	Date of birth
Stanislaw Aniolkowski (POL)	20 January 1997 (aged 18)
Adrian Banaszek (POL)	21 October 1993 (aged 22)
Norbert Banaszek (POL)	18 June 1997 (aged 18)
Paweł Bernas (POL)	24 May 1990 (aged 25)
Łukasz Bodnar (POL)	10 May 1985 (aged 30)
Paweł Charucki (POL)	14 October 1988 (aged 27)
Paweł Cieślik (POL)	12 April 1986 (aged 29)
Paweł Franczak (POL)	7 November 1991 (aged 24)

Rider	Date of birth
Kamil Gradek (POL)	17 September 1990 (aged 25)
Karel Hník (CZE)	9 August 1991 (aged 24)
Jonas Koch (GER)	15 June 1993 (aged 22)
Michał Podlaski (POL)	13 May 1988 (aged 27)
Jiri Polnicky (CZE)	16 December 1990 (aged 25)
Jordi Simón (ESP)	6 September 1990 (aged 25)
Adam Stachowiak (POL)	10 July 1989 (aged 26)
Daniel Staniszewski (POL)	5 May 1997 (aged 18)

Riders who joined the team for the 2016 season

Rider	2015 team
Stanislaw Aniolkowski	neo-pro
Adrian Banaszek	Kolss BDC Team
Norbert Banaszek	neo-pro
Paweł Charucki	Domin Sport
Pawel Cieslik	neo-pro (Whirlpool-Author)
Karel Hnik	Cult Energy Pro Cycling
Jonas Koch	neo-pro (Rad-Net Rose)
Jiri Polnicky	neo-pro (Whirlpool-Author)
Jordi Simón	ex-pro (Team Ecuador)
Adam Stachowiak	neo-pro (Kolss-BDC)
Daniel Staniszewski	neo-pro

== Season victories ==
Date	Race	Competition	Rider	Country	Location
8 May	Szlakiem Grodów Piastowskich, Stage 3	UCI Europe Tour	Jiri Polnicky (CZE)	Poland	Dzierzoniow
29 June	Course de la Solidarité Olympique, Stage 1	UCI Europe Tour	Paweł Franczak (POL)	Poland	Łódź
2 July	Course de la Solidarité Olympique, Points classification	UCI Europe Tour	Paweł Franczak (POL)	Poland	
27 June	Dookoła Mazowsza, Prologue	UCI Europe Tour	Adrian Banaszek (POL)	Poland	Warsaw
13 August	Memoriał Henryka Łasaka	UCI Europe Tour	Paweł Franczak (POL)	Poland	Sucha Beskidzka
