= Adrian Banaszek =

Polish cyclist (born 1993)

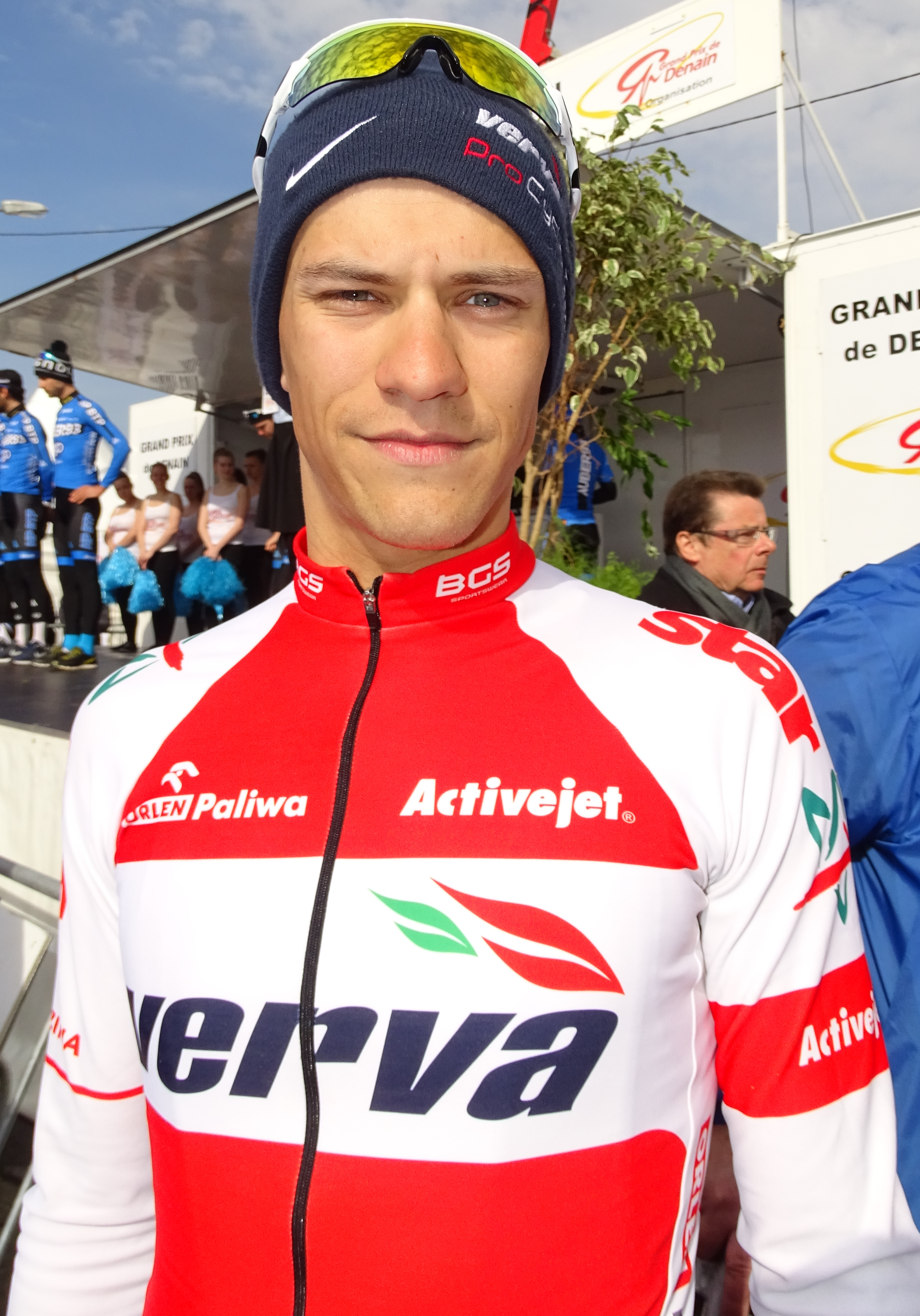
- Banaszek in 2016.

Personal information
- Full name: Adrian Banaszek
- Born: 21 October 1993 (age 32) Boża Wola, Poland
- Height: 1.85 m (6 ft 1 in)
- Weight: 79 kg (174 lb)

Cycling career
- Sport: Cycling
- Current team: Mazowsze Serce Polski
- Discipline: Road
- Role: Rider (retired); Directeur sportif

Professional teams
- 2012–2014: BDC–Marcpol Team
- 2015: Kolss BDC Team
- 2016: Verva ActiveJet
- 2017: Kolss Cycling Team
- 2018–2019: Voster ATS Team
- 2020–2023: Mazowsze Serce Polski

Managerial team
- 2024–: Mazowsze Serce Polski

Adrian Banaszek (born 21 October 1993) is a Polish former cyclist, who competed as a professional from 2012 to 2023. He now works as a directeur sportif for UCI Continental team Mazowsze Serce Polski. His brother Norbert Banaszek and cousin Alan Banaszek are also professional cyclists with the Mazowsze Serce Polski team.

== Major results ==
2013
1st Stage 4 (TTT) Dookoła Mazowsza
2014
4th Puchar Ministra Obrony Narodowej
2015
5th Memoriał Andrzeja Trochanowskiego
5th Memoriał Romana Siemińskiego
10th Road race, UEC European Under-23 Road Championships
2016
2nd Overall Dookoła Mazowsza

1st Prologue

7th Memorial Grundmanna I Wizowskiego
9th Korona Kocich Gór
2017
1st Prologue Dookoła Mazowsza
2018
3rd Grand Prix Doliny Baryczy Milicz
4th Overall Dookoła Mazowsza
6th Memoriał Henryka Łasaka
7th Memorial Grundmanna I Wizowskiego
9th Memoriał Romana Siemińskiego
2019
9th Visegrad 4 Bicycle Race – GP Slovakia
2020
7th Overall Dookoła Mazowsza
8th Overall Tour Bitwa Warszawska 1920
2021
4th Overall Tour of Szeklerland
5th Puchar Ministra Obrony Narodowej
8th Overall Tour of Estonia
2022
1st Stage 1 (TTT) Belgrade Banjaluka
5th Memoriał Andrzeja Trochanowskiego
2023
1st GP Doliny Baryczy Zmigrod
