= 2021 Tour de Hongrie =

2021 UCI Europe Tour

Race details
- Dates: 12–16 May 2021
- Stages: 5
- Distance: 792 km (492.1 mi)
- Winning time: 18h 07' 10"

Results
Jersey awarded to the overall winner	Winner	Damien Howson (AUS)	(Team BikeExchange)
	Second	Ben Hermans (BEL)	(Israel Start-Up Nation)
	Third	Antonio Tiberi (ITA)	(Trek–Segafredo)
Jersey awarded to the points classification winner	Points	Phil Bauhaus (GER)	(Team Bahrain Victorious)
Jersey awarded to the mountains classification winner	Mountains	Maciej Paterski (POL)	(Voster ATS Team)
	Team	Astana–Premier Tech	

The 2021 Tour de Hongrie was the 42nd edition of the Tour de Hongrie, which took place between 12 and 16 May 2021. It was the seventh edition since the race's revival in 2015, and was rated as a 2.1 event as part of the 2021 UCI Europe Tour.

== Teams ==
Eight UCI WorldTeams, nine UCI ProTeams, four UCI Continental teams, and the Hungarian national team made up the twenty-two teams that participated in the race. With five riders each, Adria Mobil and Uno-X Pro Cycling Team are the only teams to not field a maximum roster of six riders. There were 130 riders who started the race, of which 117 finished.

UCI WorldTeams

- Astana–Premier Tech
- Bora–Hansgrohe
- Israel Start-Up Nation
- Team Bahrain Victorious
- Team BikeExchange
- Team DSM
- Team Jumbo–Visma
- Trek–Segafredo

UCI ProTeams

- Androni Giocattoli–Sidermec
- Bingoal Pauwels Sauces WB
- Caja Rural–Seguros RGA
- Eolo–Kometa
- Gazprom–RusVelo
- Sport Vlaanderen–Baloise
- Team Novo Nordisk
- Uno-X Pro Cycling Team
- Vini Zabù

UCI Continental Teams

- Adria Mobil
- Giotti Victoria–Savini Due
- HRE Mazowsze Serce Polski
- Voster ATS Team

National Team

- Hungary

== Route ==
Stage characteristics and winners
Stage	Date	Route	Distance	Type	Winner
1	12 May	Siófok to Kaposvár	173 km (107 mi)	Flat stage	Phil Bauhaus (GER)
2	13 May	Balatonfüred to Nagykanizsa	183 km (114 mi)	Hilly stage	Jordi Meeus (BEL)
3	14 May	Veszprém to Tata	142 km (88 mi)	Hilly stage	Phil Bauhaus (GER)
4	15 May	Balassagyarmat to Gyöngyös (Kékestető)	202 km (126 mi)	Intermediate stage	Damien Howson (AUS)
5	16 May	Budapest to Budapest	92 km (57 mi)	Flat stage	Edward Theuns (BEL)
Total		792 km (492 mi)			

== Stages ==
=== Stage 1 ===
12 May 2021 — Siófok to Kaposvár, 173 km (107 mi)

Stage 1 Result
Rank	Rider	Team	Time
1	Phil Bauhaus (GER)	Team Bahrain Victorious	3h 54' 22"
2	Jakub Mareczko (ITA)	Vini Zabù	+ 0"
3	Jordi Meeus (BEL)	Bora–Hansgrohe	+ 0"
4	Rudy Barbier (FRA)	Israel Start-Up Nation	+ 0"
5	Timothy Dupont (BEL)	Bingoal Pauwels Sauces WB	+ 0"
6	Kaden Groves (AUS)	Team BikeExchange	+ 0"
7	Olav Kooij (NED)	Team Jumbo–Visma	+ 0"
8	Niklas Larsen (DEN)	Uno-X Pro Cycling Team	+ 0"
9	Erlend Blikra (NOR)	Uno-X Pro Cycling Team	+ 0"
10	Alberto Dainese (ITA)	Team DSM	+ 0"

General classification after Stage 1
Rank	Rider	Team	Time
1	Phil Bauhaus (GER)	Team Bahrain Victorious	3h 54' 12"
2	Jakub Mareczko (ITA)	Vini Zabù	+ 4"
3	Patryk Stosz (POL)	Voster ATS Team	+ 4"
4	Jordi Meeus (BEL)	Bora–Hansgrohe	+ 6"
5	Diego Pablo Sevilla (ESP)	Eolo–Kometa	+ 6"
6	Edward Theuns (BEL)	Trek–Segafredo	+ 7"
7	Fabio Van den Bossche (BEL)	Sport Vlaanderen–Baloise	+ 8"
8	Taj Jones (AUS)	Israel Start-Up Nation	+ 8"
9	Alan Banaszek (POL)	HRE Mazowsze Serce Polski	+ 9"
10	Rudy Barbier (FRA)	Israel Start-Up Nation	+ 10"

=== Stage 2 ===
13 May 2021 — Balatonfüred to Nagykanizsa, 183 km (114 mi)

Stage 2 Result
Rank	Rider	Team	Time
1	Jordi Meeus (BEL)	Bora–Hansgrohe	4h 03' 55"
2	Alberto Dainese (ITA)	Team DSM	+ 0"
3	Phil Bauhaus (GER)	Team Bahrain Victorious	+ 0"
4	Olav Kooij (NED)	Team Jumbo–Visma	+ 0"
5	Kaden Groves (AUS)	Team BikeExchange	+ 0"
6	Rudy Barbier (FRA)	Israel Start-Up Nation	+ 0"
7	Edward Theuns (BEL)	Trek–Segafredo	+ 0"
8	Timothy Dupont (BEL)	Bingoal Pauwels Sauces WB	+ 0"
9	David González (ESP)	Caja Rural–Seguros RGA	+ 0"
10	Jordi Warlop (BEL)	Sport Vlaanderen–Baloise	+ 0"

General classification after Stage 2
Rank	Rider	Team	Time
1	Jordi Meeus (BEL)	Bora–Hansgrohe	7h 58' 03"
2	Phil Bauhaus (GER)	Team Bahrain Victorious	+ 0"
3	Maciej Paterski (POL)	Voster ATS Team	+ 6"
4	Alberto Dainese (ITA)	Team DSM	+ 8"
5	Jakub Mareczko (ITA)	Vini Zabù	+ 8"
6	Patryk Stosz (POL)	Voster ATS Team	+ 8"
7	Diego Pablo Sevilla (ESP)	Eolo–Kometa	+ 8"
8	János Pelikán (HUN)	Androni Giocattoli–Sidermec	+ 10"
9	Edward Theuns (BEL)	Trek–Segafredo	+ 11"
10	Fabio Van den Bossche (BEL)	Sport Vlaanderen–Baloise	+ 12"

=== Stage 3 ===
14 May 2021 — Veszprém to Tata, 142 km (88 mi)

Stage 3 Result
Rank	Rider	Team	Time
1	Phil Bauhaus (GER)	Team Bahrain Victorious	3h 17' 30"
2	Mike Teunissen (NED)	Team Jumbo–Visma	+ 0"
3	Fred Wright (GBR)	Team Bahrain Victorious	+ 0"
4	Davide Martinelli (ITA)	Astana–Premier Tech	+ 0"
5	Mihkel Räim (EST)	HRE Mazowsze Serce Polski	+ 0"
6	Jordi Warlop (BEL)	Sport Vlaanderen–Baloise	+ 0"
7	Timothy Dupont (BEL)	Bingoal Pauwels Sauces WB	+ 0"
8	Kristoffer Halvorsen (NOR)	Uno-X Pro Cycling Team	+ 0"
9	Luca Pacioni (ITA)	Eolo–Kometa	+ 0"
10	Taj Jones (AUS)	Israel Start-Up Nation	+ 0"

General classification after Stage 3
Rank	Rider	Team	Time
1	Phil Bauhaus (GER)	Team Bahrain Victorious	11h 15' 23"
2	Jordi Meeus (BEL)	Bora–Hansgrohe	+ 10"
3	Patryk Stosz (POL)	Voster ATS Team	+ 15"
4	Maciej Paterski (POL)	Voster ATS Team	+ 16"
5	Mike Teunissen (NED)	Team Jumbo–Visma	+ 18"
6	Jakub Mareczko (ITA)	Vini Zabù	+ 18"
7	Alberto Dainese (ITA)	Team DSM	+ 18"
8	Norbert Banaszek (POL)	HRE Mazowsze Serce Polski	+ 19"
9	Fred Wright (GBR)	Team Bahrain Victorious	+ 20"
10	János Pelikán (HUN)	Androni Giocattoli–Sidermec	+ 20"

=== Stage 4 ===
15 May 2021 — Balassagyarmat to Gyöngyös (Kékestető), 202 km (126 mi)

Stage 4 Result
Rank	Rider	Team	Time
1	Damien Howson (AUS)	Team BikeExchange	4h 55' 50"
2	Ben Hermans (BEL)	Israel Start-Up Nation	+ 9"
3	Antonio Tiberi (ITA)	Trek–Segafredo	+ 15"
4	Jhojan García (COL)	Caja Rural–Seguros RGA	+ 19"
5	Stefan de Bod (RSA)	Astana–Premier Tech	+ 32"
6	Laurens Huys (BEL)	Bingoal Pauwels Sauces WB	+ 38"
7	Paweł Cieślik (POL)	Voster ATS Team	+ 41"
8	Javier Romo (ESP)	Astana–Premier Tech	+ 41"
9	Kevin Colleoni (ITA)	Team BikeExchange	+ 44"
10	Santiago Buitrago (COL)	Team Bahrain Victorious	+ 46"

General classification after Stage 4
Rank	Rider	Team	Time
1	Damien Howson (AUS)	Team BikeExchange	16h 11' 24"
2	Ben Hermans (BEL)	Israel Start-Up Nation	+ 16"
3	Antonio Tiberi (ITA)	Trek–Segafredo	+ 24"
4	Jhojan García (COL)	Caja Rural–Seguros RGA	+ 32"
5	Stefan de Bod (RSA)	Astana–Premier Tech	+ 45"
6	Laurens Huys (BEL)	Bingoal Pauwels Sauces WB	+ 51"
7	Paweł Cieślik (POL)	Voster ATS Team	+ 54"
8	Javier Romo (ESP)	Astana–Premier Tech	+ 54"
9	Kevin Colleoni (ITA)	Team BikeExchange	+ 57"
10	Santiago Buitrago (COL)	Team Bahrain Victorious	+ 59"

=== Stage 5 ===
16 May 2021 — Budapest to Budapest, 92 km (57 mi)

Stage 5 Result
Rank	Rider	Team	Time
1	Edward Theuns (BEL)	Trek–Segafredo	1h 55' 46"
2	Olav Kooij (NED)	Team Jumbo–Visma	+ 0"
3	Timothy Dupont (BEL)	Bingoal Pauwels Sauces WB	+ 0"
4	Phil Bauhaus (GER)	Team Bahrain Victorious	+ 0"
5	Matteo Malucelli (ITA)	Androni Giocattoli–Sidermec	+ 0"
6	Jordi Meeus (BEL)	Bora–Hansgrohe	+ 0"
7	Sasha Weemaes (BEL)	Sport Vlaanderen–Baloise	+ 0"
8	Rudy Barbier (FRA)	Israel Start-Up Nation	+ 0"
9	Mike Teunissen (NED)	Team Jumbo–Visma	+ 0"
10	Orluis Aular (VEN)	Caja Rural–Seguros RGA	+ 0"

General classification after Stage 5
Rank	Rider	Team	Time
1	Damien Howson (AUS)	Team BikeExchange	18h 07' 10"
2	Ben Hermans (BEL)	Israel Start-Up Nation	+ 16"
3	Antonio Tiberi (ITA)	Trek–Segafredo	+ 24"
4	Jhojan García (COL)	Caja Rural–Seguros RGA	+ 32"
5	Stefan de Bod (RSA)	Astana–Premier Tech	+ 45"
6	Laurens Huys (BEL)	Bingoal Pauwels Sauces WB	+ 51"
7	Paweł Cieślik (POL)	Voster ATS Team	+ 54"
8	Javier Romo (ESP)	Astana–Premier Tech	+ 54"
9	Kevin Colleoni (ITA)	Team BikeExchange	+ 57"
10	Santiago Buitrago (COL)	Team Bahrain Victorious	+ 59"

== Classification leadership table ==
Points for the points classification
Type	1	2	3	4	5	6	7	8	9	10
Stage finishes	15	12	10	8	6	5	4	3	2	1
Intermediate sprint	5	3	1	0						

Points for the mountains classification
Type	1	2	3	4	5	6	7
Points for Category	10	7	5	4	3	2	1
Points for Category	6	4	2	1	0		
Points for Category	5	3	1	0			

In the 2021 Tour de Hongrie, four jerseys are awarded. The general classification is calculated by adding each cyclist's finishing times on each stage. The leader of the general classification receives a yellow jersey, sponsored by the Hungarian Tourism Agency (Aktív Magyarország), and the winner of this classification is considered the winner of the race.

The second classification is the points classification. Riders are awarded points for finishing in the top fifteen of each stage. Points are also on offer at intermediate sprints. The leader of the points classification wears a green jersey, sponsored by Škoda and Europcar.

There is also a mountains classification for which points are awarded for reaching the top of a climb before other riders. The climbs are categorized, in order of increasing difficulty, as third, second, and first-category. The leader of the mountains classification wears a red jersey, sponsored by Cofidis.

The fourth jersey is a classification for Hungarian riders, marked by a white jersey sponsored by the Hungarian Public Road Company (Magyar Közút) and the Hungarian Cycling Federation (Bringasport). Only Hungarian riders are eligible and they are ranked according to their placement in the general classification of the race.

The final classification is the team classification, for which the times of the best three cyclists in each team on each stage are added together; the leading team at the end of the race is the team with the lowest cumulative time.

Classification leadership by stage
Stage	Winner	General classification	Points classification	Mountains classification	Hungarian rider classification	Team classification
1	Phil Bauhaus	Phil Bauhaus	Phil Bauhaus	Patryk Stosz	Ádám Kristóf Karl	Uno-X Pro Cycling Team
2	Jordi Meeus	Jordi Meeus	Jordi Meeus	Maciej Paterski	János Pelikán	Trek–Segafredo
3	Phil Bauhaus	Phil Bauhaus	Phil Bauhaus	Maciej Paterski	János Pelikán	Trek–Segafredo
4	Damien Howson	Damien Howson	Phil Bauhaus	Maciej Paterski	János Pelikán	Astana–Premier Tech
5	Edward Theuns	Damien Howson	Phil Bauhaus	Maciej Paterski	János Pelikán	Astana–Premier Tech
Final		Damien Howson	Phil Bauhaus	Maciej Paterski	János Pelikán	Astana–Premier Tech

- On stage 2, Jakub Mareczko, who was second in the points classification, wore the green jersey, because first-placed Phil Bauhaus wore the yellow jersey as the leader of the general classification.
- On stage 3, Phil Bauhaus, who was second in the points classification, wore the green jersey, because first-placed Jordi Meeus wore the yellow jersey as the leader of the general classification.
- On stage 4, Jordi Meeus, who was second in the points classification, wore the green jersey, because first-placed Phil Bauhaus wore the yellow jersey as the leader of the general classification.

== Final classification standings ==
Legend
Yellow jersey	Denotes the winner of the general classification	Green jersey	Denotes the winner of the points classification
Red jersey	Denotes the winner of the mountains classification	White jersey	Denotes the winner of the Hungarian rider classification

=== General classification ===
Final general classification (1–10)
Rank	Rider	Team	Time
1	Damien Howson (AUS)	Team BikeExchange	18h 07' 10"
2	Ben Hermans (BEL)	Israel Start-Up Nation	+ 16"
3	Antonio Tiberi (ITA)	Trek–Segafredo	+ 24"
4	Jhojan García (COL)	Caja Rural–Seguros RGA	+ 32"
5	Stefan de Bod (RSA)	Astana–Premier Tech	+ 45"
6	Laurens Huys (BEL)	Bingoal Pauwels Sauces WB	+ 51"
7	Paweł Cieślik (POL)	Voster ATS Team	+ 54"
8	Javier Romo (ESP)	Astana–Premier Tech	+ 54"
9	Kevin Colleoni (ITA)	Team BikeExchange	+ 57"
10	Santiago Buitrago (COL)	Team Bahrain Victorious	+ 59"

=== Points classification ===
Final points classification (1–10)
Rank	Rider	Team	Points
1	Phil Bauhaus (GER)	Team Bahrain Victorious	53
2	Jordi Meeus (BEL)	Bora–Hansgrohe	30
3	Edward Theuns (BEL)	Trek–Segafredo	24
4	Olav Kooij (NED)	Team Jumbo–Visma	24
5	Timothy Dupont (BEL)	Bingoal Pauwels Sauces WB	23
6	Damien Howson (AUS)	Team BikeExchange	20
7	Jordi Warlop (BEL)	Sport Vlaanderen–Baloise	19
8	Mike Teunissen (NED)	Team Jumbo–Visma	17
9	Alberto Dainese (ITA)	Team DSM	16
10	Rudy Barbier (FRA)	Israel Start-Up Nation	16

=== Mountains classification ===
Final mountains classification (1–10)
Rank	Rider	Team	Points
1	Maciej Paterski (POL)	Voster ATS Team	21
2	Patryk Stosz (POL)	Voster ATS Team	13
3	Damien Howson (AUS)	Team BikeExchange	10
4	Ben Hermans (BEL)	Israel Start-Up Nation	7
5	Sergio Martín (ESP)	Caja Rural–Seguros RGA	7
6	Antonio Tiberi (ITA)	Trek–Segafredo	5
7	Diego Pablo Sevilla (ESP)	Eolo–Kometa	5
8	Jhojan García (COL)	Caja Rural–Seguros RGA	4
9	Gilles De Wilde (BEL)	Sport Vlaanderen–Baloise	4
10	Stefan de Bod (RSA)	Astana–Premier Tech	3

=== Hungarian rider classification ===
Final Hungarian rider classification (1–10)
Rank	Rider	Team	Time
1	János Pelikán (HUN)	Androni Giocattoli–Sidermec	18h 08' 42"
2	Barnabás Peák (HUN)	Team BikeExchange	+ 55"
3	Erik Fetter (HUN)	Eolo–Kometa	+ 1' 42"
4	Viktor Filutás (HUN)	Giotti Victoria–Savini Due	+ 5' 00"
5	Zsombor Palumby (HUN)	Hungary	+ 5' 03"
6	Norbert Hrenkó (HUN)	Hungary	+ 6' 40"
7	Péter Kusztor (HUN)	Team Novo Nordisk	+ 7' 54"
8	Ferenc Szöllősi (HUN)	Hungary	+ 8' 03"
9	Gergő Orosz (HUN)	Hungary	+ 9' 02"
10	Balázs Rózsa (HUN)	Hungary	+ 9' 02"

=== Team classification ===
Final team classification (1–10)
Rank	Team	Time
1	Astana–Premier Tech	54h 24' 49"
2	Caja Rural–Seguros RGA	+ 12"
3	Team BikeExchange	+ 18"
4	Eolo–Kometa	+ 1' 18"
5	Trek–Segafredo	+ 1' 22"
6	Sport Vlaanderen–Baloise	+ 1' 41"
7	Team Jumbo–Visma	+ 2' 18"
8	Vini Zabù	+ 2' 47"
9	Bingoal Pauwels Sauces WB	+ 3' 24"
10	Androni Giocattoli–Sidermec	+ 4' 22"

== UCI point ranking ==
Position	1.	2.	3.	4.	5.	6.	7.	8.	9.	10.	11.	12.	13.-15.	16.-25.
General classification	125	85	70	60	50	40	35	30	25	20	15	10	5	3
Per stage	14	5	3
Leader	3

Classification
Position	Rider	Team	General	Stage	Leader	Total
1.	(Australia) Damien Howson	Team BikeExchange	125	14	-	139
2.	(Belgium) Ben Hermans	Israel Start-Up Nation	85	5	-	90
3.	(Italy) Antonio Tiberi	Trek–Segafredo	70	3	-	73
4.	(Colombia) Jhojan García	Caja Rural–Seguros RGA	60	-	-	60
5.	(South Africa) Stefan de Bod	Astana–Premier Tech	50	-	-	50
6.	(Belgium) Laurens Huys	Bingoal Pauwels Sauces WB	40	-	-	40
7.	(Poland) Paweł Cieślik	Voster ATS Team	35	-	-	35
8.	(Germany) Phil Bauhaus	Team Bahrain Victorious	-	28	6	34
9.	(Spain) Javier Romo	Astana–Premier Tech	30	-	-	30
10.	(Italy) Kevin Colleoni	Team BikeExchange	25	-	-	25

== See also ==
- 2021 in men's road cycling
- 2021 in sports
