= Dominik Neuman =

Czech cyclist (born 1995)

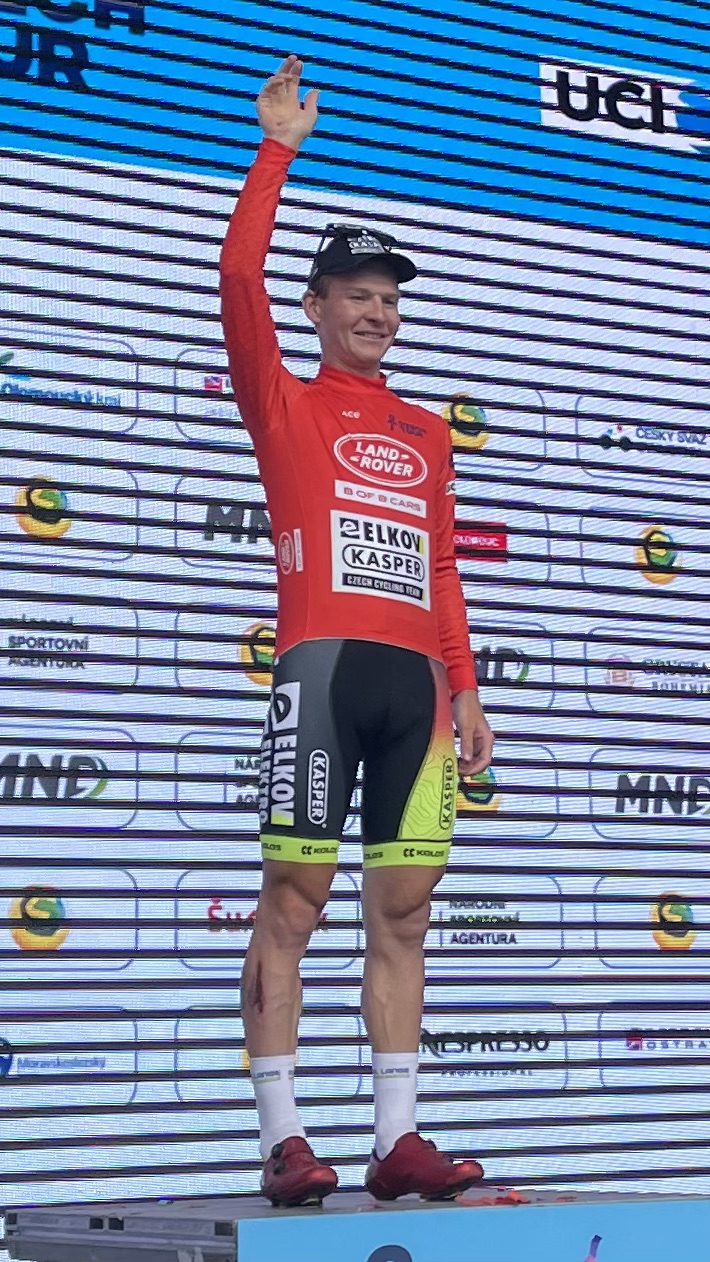
- Neuman in 2023

Personal information
- Born: 23 October 1995 (age 30) Brno, Czech Republic
- Height: 1.81 m (5 ft 11 in)
- Weight: 72 kg (159 lb)

Cycling career
- Sport: Cycling
- Current team: ATT Investments
- Discipline: Road
- Role: Rider
- Rider type: Sprinter

Amateur teams
- 2015–2016: TJ Favorit Brno
- 2017–2018: Topforex–Lapierre

Professional teams
- 2019–2023: Elkov–Author
- 2024–: ATT Investments

Dominik Neuman (born 23 October 1995) is a Czech racing cyclist, who currently rides for UCI Continental team ATT Investments.

== Major results ==
2017
7th Memorial Henryka Łasaka
9th GP Polski
2019
3rd GP Slovakia
4th Croatia–Slovenia
7th GP Adria Mobil
7th Memoriał Romana Siemińskiego
2020
5th GP Kranj
7th GP Slovakia
2021
2nd Road race, National Road Championships
2022
3rd Overall Circuit des Ardennes
6th GP Gorenjska
6th GP Kranj
8th Overall Tour du Loir et Cher
8th Overall Okolo Jižních Čech
2023
5th Road race, National Road Championships
5th Ronde van Overijssel
7th GP Gorenjska
10th Overall Gemenc Grand Prix
2024
6th Trofej Umag
6th GP Slovakia
7th GP Czech Republic
7th GP Kranj
9th Poreč Trophy
2025
1st Overall Tour of Szeklerland

1st Points classification
1st Stages 1 & 2

6th Overall Course Cycliste de Solidarnosc et des Champions Olympiques
9th Overall Tour of Estonia
