= 2021 Tour of Romania =

2021 UCI Europe Tour

Race details
- Dates: 31 August–5 September
- Stages: 5 + Prologue
- Distance: 822.6 km (511.1 mi)
- Winning time: 18h 21' 19"

Results
Jersey awarded to the overall winner	Winner	Jakub Kaczmarek (POL)	(HRE Mazowsze Serce Polski)
	Second	Serghei Țvetcov (ROU)	(Wildlife Generation Pro Cycling)
	Third	Szymon Rekita (POL)	(Voster ATS Team)
Jersey awarded to the points classification winner	Points	Patryk Stosz (POL)	(Voster ATS Team)
Jersey awarded to the mountains classification winner	Mountains	Maciej Paterski (POL)	(Voster ATS Team)
	Team	Androni Giocattoli–Sidermec	

The 2021 Tour of Romania was a six-day cycling stage race that took place in Romania in August and September 2021. The race was the 54th edition of the Tour of Romania. The tour was rated as a 2.1 event, as part of the 2021 UCI Europe Tour.

Jakub Kaczmarek became the second Polish rider to win the Tour of Romania after Daniel Zigmund in 1935.

== Route ==
Stages of the 2021 Tour of Romania
Stage	Date	Route	Distance	Type	Winner
Prologue	31 August	Timișoara (ITT)	3.9 km (2.4 mi)	Individual time trial	János Pelikán (HUN)
1	1 September	Timișoara to Deva	201.5 km (125.2 mi)	Plain stage	Patryk Stosz (POL)
2	2 September	Deva to Păltiniș	154.9 km (96.3 mi)	Mountain stage	Daniel Muñoz (COL)
3	3 September	Sibiu to Poiana Brașov	187 km (116 mi)	Intermediate stage	Emil Dima (ROU)
4	4 September	Brașov to Bucharest	159.3 km (99.0 mi)	Intermediate stage	Daniel Babor (CZE)
5	5 September	Bucharest (circuit)	116 km (72 mi)	Plain stage	Patryk Stosz (POL)
Total			822.6 km (511.1 mi)		

== Teams ==
Twenty teams were invited to start the race. Sixteen gave a positive answer: one UCI ProTeam, twelve UCI Continental Teams and three national teams.

UCI ProTeams

- Androni Giocattoli–Sidermec

UCI Continental teams

- Wildlife Generation Pro Cycling
- Maloja Pushbikers
- Giotti Victoria–Savini Due
- Voster ATS Team
- Bike Aid
- Vino–Astana Motors
- Work Service–Marchiol–Vega
- Tufo–Pardus Prostějov
- D'Amico–UM Tools
- Cycling Academy Trenčín
- Kuwait Pro Cycling Team
- HRE Mazowsze Serce Polski

National teams

- Romania
- Poland
- Serbia

== Stages ==
=== Prologue ===
31 August 2021 — Timișoara, 3.9 km (2.4 mi) (ITT)

Prologue Result
Rank	Rider	Team	Time
1	János Pelikán (HUN)	Androni Giocattoli–Sidermec	4' 52"
2	Daniel Crista (ROU)	Romania	+ 1"
3	Justin Wolf (GER)	Bike Aid	+ 5"
4	Tobiasz Pawlak (POL)	HRE Mazowsze Serce Polski	+ 7"
5	Adrian Banaszek (POL)	HRE Mazowsze Serce Polski	+ 8"
6	Norbert Banaszek (POL)	HRE Mazowsze Serce Polski	+ 9"
7	Alex Hoehn (USA)	Wildlife Generation Pro Cycling	+ 9"
8	Serghei Țvetcov (ROU)	Wildlife Generation Pro Cycling	+ 9"
9	Alan Banaszek (POL)	HRE Mazowsze Serce Polski	+ 9"
10	Mika Heming (GER)	Maloja Pushbikers	+ 10"

General classification after Prologue
Rank	Rider	Team	Time
1	János Pelikán (HUN)	Androni Giocattoli–Sidermec	4' 52"
2	Daniel Crista (ROU)	Romania	+ 1"
3	Justin Wolf (GER)	Bike Aid	+ 5"
4	Tobiasz Pawlak (POL)	HRE Mazowsze Serce Polski	+ 7"
5	Adrian Banaszek (POL)	HRE Mazowsze Serce Polski	+ 8"
6	Norbert Banaszek (POL)	HRE Mazowsze Serce Polski	+ 9"
7	Alex Hoehn (USA)	Wildlife Generation Pro Cycling	+ 9"
8	Serghei Țvetcov (ROU)	Wildlife Generation Pro Cycling	+ 9"
9	Alan Banaszek (POL)	HRE Mazowsze Serce Polski	+ 9"
10	Mika Heming (GER)	Maloja Pushbikers	+ 10"

=== Stage 1 ===
1 September 2021 — Timișoara to Deva, 201.5 km (125.2 mi)

Stage 1 Result
Rank	Rider	Team	Time
1	Patryk Stosz (POL)	Voster ATS Team	4h 33' 15"
2	Lucas Carstensen (GER)	Bike Aid	+ 0"
3	Dušan Rajović (SRB)	Serbia	+ 0"
4	Eduard-Michael Grosu (ROU)	Romania	+ 0"
5	Alan Banaszek (POL)	HRE Mazowsze Serce Polski	+ 0"
6	Kent Ross (USA)	Wildlife Generation Pro Cycling	+ 0"
7	Andrea Guardini (ITA)	Giotti Victoria–Savini Due	+ 0"
8	Daniel Smarzaro (ITA)	D'Amico–UM Tools	+ 0"
9	Cristian Rocchetta (ITA)	Androni Giocattoli–Sidermec	+ 0"
10	Emanuele Onesti (ITA)	Giotti Victoria–Savini Due	+ 0"

General classification after Stage 1
Rank	Rider	Team	Time
1	Daniel Crista (ROU)	Romania	4h 37' 59"
2	János Pelikán (HUN)	Androni Giocattoli–Sidermec	+ 7"
3	Patryk Stosz (POL)	Voster ATS Team	+ 9"
4	Justin Wolf (GER)	Bike Aid	+ 11"
5	Tobiasz Pawlak (POL)	HRE Mazowsze Serce Polski	+ 15"
6	Mika Heming (GER)	Maloja Pushbikers	+ 15"
7	Adrian Banaszek (POL)	HRE Mazowsze Serce Polski	+ 16"
8	Norbert Banaszek (POL)	HRE Mazowsze Serce Polski	+ 16"
9	Alex Hoehn (USA)	Wildlife Generation Pro Cycling	+ 17"
10	Alan Banaszek (POL)	HRE Mazowsze Serce Polski	+ 17"

=== Stage 2 ===
2 September 2021 — Deva to Păltiniș, 154.9 km (96.3 mi)

Stage 2 Result
Rank	Rider	Team	Time
1	Daniel Muñoz (COL)	Androni Giocattoli–Sidermec	3h 43' 51"
2	Szymon Rekita (POL)	Voster ATS Team	+ 0"
3	Serghei Țvetcov (ROU)	Wildlife Generation Pro Cycling	+ 0"
4	Jakub Kaczmarek (POL)	HRE Mazowsze Serce Polski	+ 0"
5	Eduardo Sepúlveda (ARG)	Androni Giocattoli–Sidermec	+ 0"
6	Justin Wolf (GER)	Bike Aid	+ 2"
7	Davide Rebellin (ITA)	Work Service–Marchiol–Vega	+ 6"
8	Maciej Paterski (POL)	Voster ATS Team	+ 55"
9	Maksym Bilyi (UKR)	D'Amico–UM Tools	+ 55"
10	Julian Lino (FRA)	Bike Aid	+ 56"

General classification after Stage 2
Rank	Rider	Team	Time
1	Serghei Țvetcov (ROU)	Wildlife Generation Pro Cycling	8h 22' 03"
2	Jakub Kaczmarek (POL)	HRE Mazowsze Serce Polski	+ 0"
3	Justin Wolf (GER)	Bike Aid	+ 0"
4	Szymon Rekita (POL)	Voster ATS Team	+ 3"
5	Eduardo Sepúlveda (ARG)	Androni Giocattoli–Sidermec	+ 7"
6	Daniel Muñoz (COL)	Androni Giocattoli–Sidermec	+ 8"
7	Davide Rebellin (ITA)	Work Service–Marchiol–Vega	+ 24"
8	Maksym Bilyi (UKR)	D'Amico–UM Tools	+ 1' 3"
9	Julian Lino (FRA)	Bike Aid	+ 1' 6"
10	Maciej Paterski (POL)	Voster ATS Team	+ 1' 7"

=== Stage 3 ===
3 September 2021 — Sibiu to Poiana Brașov, 187 km (116 mi)

Stage 3 Result
Rank	Rider	Team	Time
1	Emil Dima (ROU)	Giotti Victoria–Savini Due	4h 24' 35"
2	Patryk Stosz (POL)	Voster ATS Team	+ 2"
3	Eduardo Sepúlveda (ARG)	Androni Giocattoli–Sidermec	+ 2"
4	Daniel Muñoz (COL)	Androni Giocattoli–Sidermec	+ 2"
5	Jakub Kaczmarek (POL)	HRE Mazowsze Serce Polski	+ 2"
6	Davide Rebellin (ITA)	Work Service–Marchiol–Vega	+ 2"
7	Szymon Rekita (POL)	Voster ATS Team	+ 2"
8	Nicolas Vinokurov (KAZ)	Vino–Astana Motors	+ 2"
9	Giacomo Garavaglia (ITA)	Work Service–Marchiol–Vega	+ 2"
10	Kristian Javier Yustre (COL)	Giotti Victoria–Savini Due	+ 2"

General classification after Stage 3
Rank	Rider	Team	Time
1	Jakub Kaczmarek (POL)	HRE Mazowsze Serce Polski	12h 46' 38"
2	Szymon Rekita (POL)	Voster ATS Team	+ 5"
3	Eduardo Sepúlveda (ARG)	Androni Giocattoli–Sidermec	+ 5"
4	Serghei Țvetcov (ROU)	Wildlife Generation Pro Cycling	+ 6"
5	Daniel Muñoz (COL)	Androni Giocattoli–Sidermec	+ 10"
6	Justin Wolf (GER)	Bike Aid	+ 13"
7	Davide Rebellin (ITA)	Work Service–Marchiol–Vega	+ 26"
8	Emil Dima (ROU)	Giotti Victoria–Savini Due	+ 1' 11"
9	Maksym Bilyi (UKR)	D'Amico–UM Tools	+ 1' 11"
10	Julian Lino (FRA)	Bike Aid	+ 1' 19"

=== Stage 4 ===
4 September 2021 — Brașov to Bucharest, 159.3 km (99.0 mi)

Stage 4 Result
Rank	Rider	Team	Time
1	Daniel Babor (CZE)	Tufo–Pardus Prostějov	3h 19' 19"
2	Daniel Smarzaro (ITA)	D'Amico–UM Tools	+ 0"
3	Lorenzo Quartucci (ARG)	D'Amico–UM Tools	+ 0"
4	Alan Banaszek (POL)	HRE Mazowsze Serce Polski	+ 0"
5	Eduard-Michael Grosu (ROU)	Romania	+ 0"
6	Tim Wollenberg (GER)	Maloja Pushbikers	+ 0"
7	Iuri Filosi (ITA)	Giotti Victoria–Savini Due	+ 0"
8	Dušan Rajović (SRB)	Serbia	+ 0"
9	Patryk Stosz (POL)	Voster ATS Team	+ 0"
10	Andrea Guardini (ITA)	Giotti Victoria–Savini Due	+ 0"

General classification after Stage 4
Rank	Rider	Team	Time
1	Jakub Kaczmarek (POL)	HRE Mazowsze Serce Polski	16h 05' 57"
2	Serghei Țvetcov (ROU)	Wildlife Generation Pro Cycling	+ 4"
3	Szymon Rekita (POL)	Voster ATS Team	+ 5"
4	Eduardo Sepúlveda (ARG)	Androni Giocattoli–Sidermec	+ 5"
5	Daniel Muñoz (COL)	Androni Giocattoli–Sidermec	+ 10"
6	Justin Wolf (GER)	Bike Aid	+ 13"
7	Davide Rebellin (ITA)	Work Service–Marchiol–Vega	+ 26"
8	Emil Dima (ROU)	Giotti Victoria–Savini Due	+ 1' 11"
9	Maksym Bilyi (UKR)	D'Amico–UM Tools	+ 1' 11"
10	Julian Lino (FRA)	Bike Aid	+ 1' 19"

=== Stage 5 ===
5 September 2021 — Bucharest, 116 km (72 mi)

Stage 5 Result
Rank	Rider	Team	Time
1	Patryk Stosz (POL)	Voster ATS Team	2h 15' 22"
2	Dušan Rajović (SRB)	Serbia	+ 0"
3	Eduard-Michael Grosu (ROU)	Romania	+ 0"
4	Andrea Guardini (ITA)	Giotti Victoria–Savini Due	+ 0"
5	Cristian Rocchetta (ITA)	Androni Giocattoli–Sidermec	+ 0"
6	Alan Banaszek (POL)	HRE Mazowsze Serce Polski	+ 0"
7	Tim Wollenberg (GER)	Maloja Pushbikers	+ 0"
8	Pawel Szostka (POL)	Poland	+ 0"
9	Lucas Carstensen (GER)	Bike Aid	+ 0"
10	Tomáš Kalojíros (POL)	Cycling Academy Trenčín	+ 0"

General classification after Stage 5
Rank	Rider	Team	Time
1	Jakub Kaczmarek (POL)	HRE Mazowsze Serce Polski	18h 21' 19"
2	Serghei Țvetcov (ROU)	Wildlife Generation Pro Cycling	+ 4"
3	Szymon Rekita (POL)	Voster ATS Team	+ 5"
4	Eduardo Sepúlveda (ARG)	Androni Giocattoli–Sidermec	+ 5"
5	Daniel Muñoz (COL)	Androni Giocattoli–Sidermec	+ 10"
6	Justin Wolf (GER)	Bike Aid	+ 13"
7	Davide Rebellin (ITA)	Work Service–Marchiol–Vega	+ 26"
8	Emil Dima (ROU)	Giotti Victoria–Savini Due	+ 1' 11"
9	Maksym Bilyi (UKR)	D'Amico–UM Tools	+ 1' 11"
10	Julian Lino (FRA)	Bike Aid	+ 1' 19"

== Classification leadership table ==
Classification leadership by stage
Stage	Winner	General classification	Points classification	Mountains classification	Young rider classification	Best Romanian rider	Team classification
P	János Pelikán	János Pelikán	Not awarded	Not awarded	Mika Heming	Daniel Crista	HRE Mazowsze Serce Polski
1	Patryk Stosz	Daniel Crista	Daniel Crista	Daniel Crista	Mika Heming	Daniel Crista	HRE Mazowsze Serce Polski
2	Daniel Muñoz	Serghei Țvetcov	Daniel Crista	Jakub Kaczmarek	Maksym Bilyi	Serghei Țvetcov	Androni Giocattoli–Sidermec
3	Emil Dima	Jakub Kaczmarek	Patryk Stosz	Jakub Kaczmarek	Maksym Bilyi	Serghei Țvetcov	Androni Giocattoli–Sidermec
4	Daniel Babor	Jakub Kaczmarek	Patryk Stosz	Maciej Paterski	Maksym Bilyi	Serghei Țvetcov	Androni Giocattoli–Sidermec
5	Patryk Stosz	Jakub Kaczmarek	Patryk Stosz	Maciej Paterski	Maksym Bilyi	Serghei Țvetcov	Androni Giocattoli–Sidermec
Final		Jakub Kaczmarek	Patryk Stosz	Maciej Paterski	Maksym Bilyi	Serghei Țvetcov	Androni Giocattoli–Sidermec

== Standings ==
Legend
Yellow jersey	Denotes the leader of the general classification	Red jersey	Denotes the leader of the points classification
Green jersey	Denotes the leader of the mountains classification	White jersey	Denotes the leader of the young rider classification
Blue jersey	Denotes the leader of the best Romanian rider classification	Team classification	Denotes the leaders of the team classification

=== General classification ===
General classification (1–10)
Rank	Rider	Team	Time
1	Jakub Kaczmarek (POL)	HRE Mazowsze Serce Polski	18h 21' 19"
2	Serghei Țvetcov (ROU)	Wildlife Generation Pro Cycling	+ 4"
3	Szymon Rekita (POL)	Voster ATS Team	+ 5"
4	Eduardo Sepúlveda (ARG)	Androni Giocattoli–Sidermec	+ 5"
5	Daniel Muñoz (COL)	Androni Giocattoli–Sidermec	+ 10"
6	Justin Wolf (GER)	Bike Aid	+ 13"
7	Davide Rebellin (ITA)	Work Service–Marchiol–Vega	+ 26"
8	Emil Dima (ROU)	Giotti Victoria–Savini Due	+ 1' 11"
9	Maksym Bilyi (UKR)	D'Amico–UM Tools	+ 1' 11"
10	Julian Lino (FRA)	Bike Aid	+ 1' 19"

=== Points classification ===
Points classification (1–5)
Rank	Rider	Team	Points
1	Patryk Stosz (POL)	Voster ATS Team	76
2	Eduard-Michael Grosu (ROU)	Romania national team	66
3	Daniel Crista (ROU)	Romania national team	50
4	Dušan Rajović (SRB)	Serbia national team	40
5	Daniel Muñoz (COL)	Androni Giocattoli–Sidermec	37

=== Mountains classification ===
Mountains classification (1–5)
Rank	Rider	Team	Points
1	Maciej Paterski (POL)	Voster ATS Team	27
2	Jakub Kaczmarek (POL)	HRE Mazowsze Serce Polski	25
3	Daniel Muñoz (COL)	Androni Giocattoli–Sidermec	22
4	Szymon Rekita (POL)	Voster ATS Team	18
5	Serghei Țvetcov (ROU)	Wildlife Generation Pro Cycling	16

=== Young rider classification ===
Young rider classification (1–5)
Rank	Rider	Team	Time
1	Maksym Bilyi (UKR)	D'Amico–UM Tools	18h 22' 30"
2	Lorenzo Quartucci (ITA)	D'Amico–UM Tools	+ 1' 08"
3	Erik Bergstrom Frisk (SWE)	Bike Aid	+ 3' 01"
4	Daniil Pronskiy (KAZ)	Vino–Astana Motors	+ 3' 38"
5	Alexandr Semenov (KAZ)	Vino–Astana Motors	+ 4' 32"

=== Best Romanian rider classification ===
Best Romanian rider classification (1–5)
Rank	Rider	Team	Time
1	Serghei Țvetcov	Wildlife Generation Pro Cycling	18h 21' 23"
2	Emil Dima	Giotti Victoria–Savini Due	+ 1' 15"
3	Ioan Dobrin	Romania national team	+ 13' 09"
4	Daniel Crista	Romania national team	+ 25' 22"
4	Iustin-Ioan Văidian	Romania national team	+ 26' 30"

=== Team classification ===
Team classification (1–5)
Rank	Team	Time
1	Androni Giocattoli–Sidermec	55h 05' 28"
2	Voster ATS Team	+ 1' 54"
3	Bike Aid	+ 4' 14"
4	Giotti Victoria–Savini Due	+ 8' 12"
5	Wildlife Generation Pro Cycling	+ 8' 33"

== See also ==
- 2021 in men's road cycling
- 2021 in sports
