= Patryk Stosz =

Polish cyclist

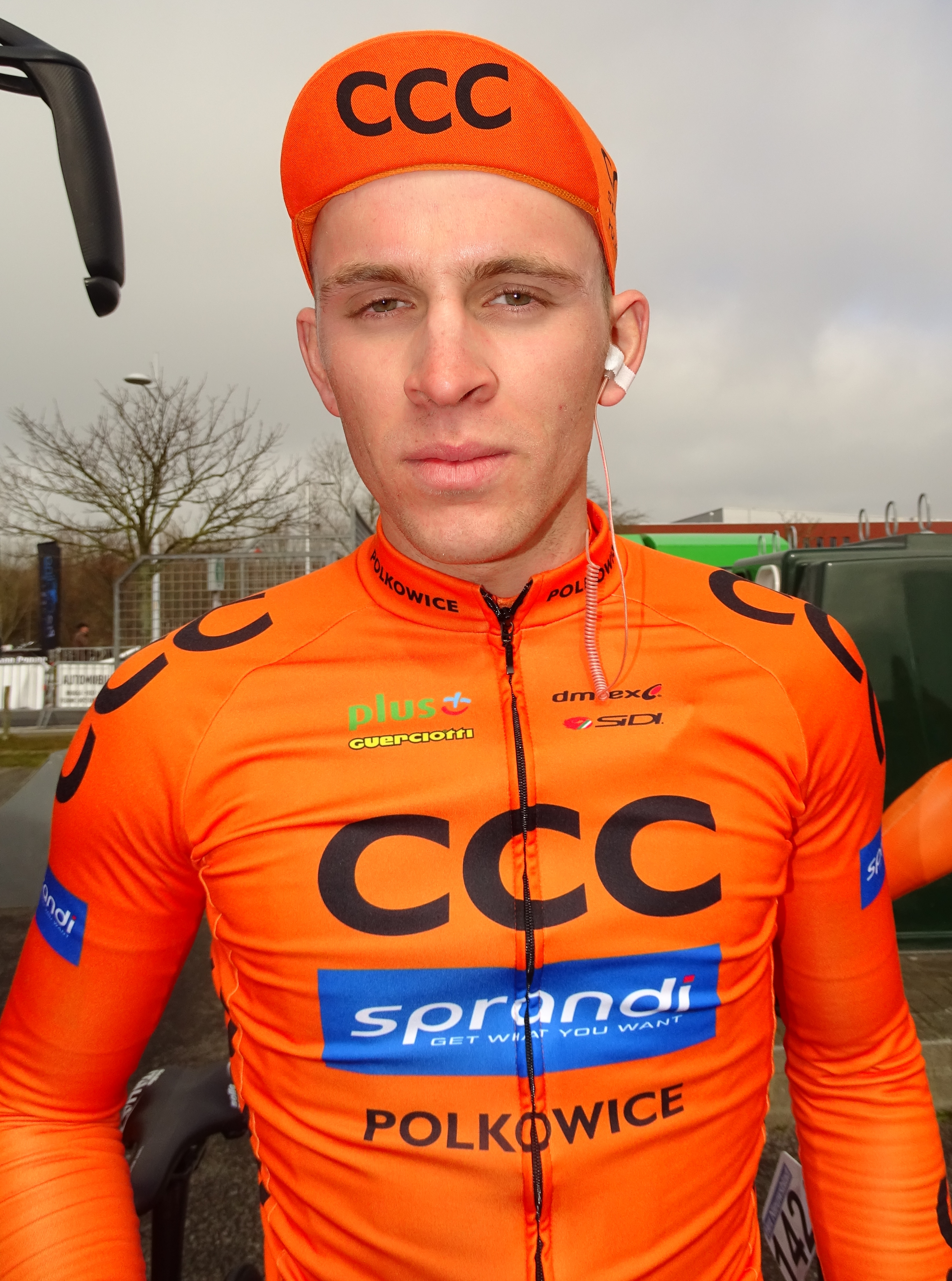
- Stosz at the 2016 Handzame Classic.

Personal information
- Full name: Patryk Stosz
- Born: 15 July 1994 (age 32) Kluczbork, Poland
- Height: 178 cm (5 ft 10 in)
- Weight: 68 kg (150 lb)

Cycling career
- Sport: Cycling
- Current team: Team Felt–Felbermayr
- Discipline: Road
- Role: Rider

Amateur team
- 2014: TC Chrobry Lasocki Głogów

Professional teams
- 2013: TC Chrobry Lasocki Głogów
- 2015–2019: CCC–Sprandi–Polkowice
- 2020–2023: Voster ATS Team
- 2024–: Team Felt–Felbermayr

Patryk Stosz (born 15 July 1994) is a Polish professional racing cyclist, who currently rides for UCI Continental team Team Felt–Felbermayr.

== Major results ==
2013
1st Mountains classification, Carpathian Couriers Race
1st Mountains classification, Course de la Paix Under-23
2014
1st Mountains classification, Carpathian Couriers Race
9th Overall Memorial Grundmanna I Wizowskiego
2015
2nd Time trial, National Under-23 Road Championships
9th Overall Carpathian Couriers Race
2016
1st Time trial, National Under-23 Road Championships
2017
7th Overall Dookoła Mazowsza
8th Korona Kocich Gór
10th Coupe des Carpathes
2018
1st Mountains classification, Tour de Hongrie
2nd Visegrad 4 Bicycle Race – Kerékpárverseny
7th Overall Bałtyk–Karkonosze Tour
10th Memorial Grundmanna I Wizowskiego
2019
1st Korona Kocich Gór
Tour of Almaty

1st Points classification
1st Stage 1

2nd Overall Course de Solidarność et des Champions Olympiques
3rd Grand Prix Alanya
4th Grand Prix Gazipaşa
4th Visegrad 4 Bicycle Race – GP Polski
6th Memoriał Andrzeja Trochanowskiego
7th Overall Szlakiem Grodów Piastowskich
8th Memoriał Romana Siemińskiego
9th Overall Bałtyk–Karkonosze Tour
2020
1st Overall Tour of Bulgaria

1st Stage 2

1st Mountains classification, Tour de Pologne
6th Tour Bitwa Warszawska 1920
7th Puchar Ministra Obrony Narodowej
2021
Tour of Romania

1st Points classification
1st Stages 1 & 5

1st Stage 2 Tour of Małopolska
1st Stage 1 Course de Solidarność et des Champions Olympiques
1st Stage 4 Circuit des Ardennes
3rd Overall Belgrade–Banja Luka

1st Stage 2

3rd Puchar Ministra Obrony Narodowej
4th Overall Okolo Jižních Čech
4th Poreč Trophy
7th Overall Szlakiem Grodów Piastowskich

1st Stage 1

10th Overall Istrian Spring Trophy
2022
1st GP Gorenjska
1st Points classification, Circuit des Ardennes
1st Stage 2 Tour of Małopolska
1st Stage 3a Tour of Bulgaria
2nd Grand Prix Nasielsk–Serock
4th Overall In the footsteps of the Romans
6th Overall Tour of Estonia
6th Memorial Henryka Łasaka
7th Overall Course de Solidarność et des Champions Olympiques

1st Stage 4

7th Grand Prix Wyszków
10th Umag Trophy
10th GP Slovenian Istria
2023
1st Poreč Trophy
1st Mountains classification, Tour of Austria
1st Stage 3 Tour of Bulgaria
2nd Overall In the Steps of Romans
4th Ringerike GP
8th Overall Belgrade Banjaluka
2024
1st Classique de l'Île Maurice
2nd Overall Course de Solidarność et des Champions Olympiques

1st Stage 1a

1st Stage 1 Tour de Maurice
2nd GP Brda-Collio
6th GP Adria Mobil
9th International Rhodes Grand Prix
10th Grand Prix Cerami
