= Jakub Kaczmarek =

Polish cyclist

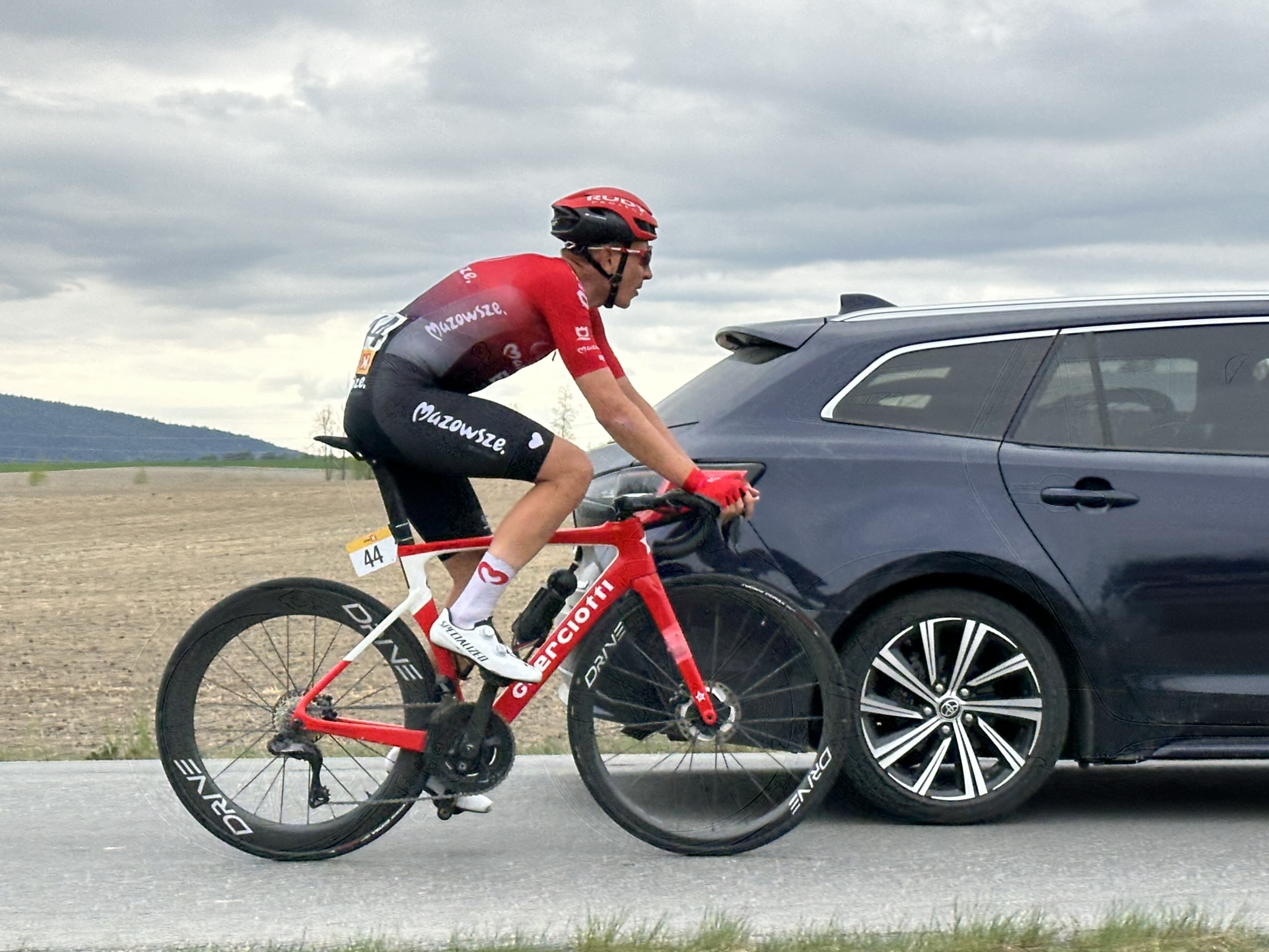

Personal information
- Full name: Jakub Kaczmarek
- Born: 27 September 1993 (age 33)
- Height: 1.82 m (6 ft 0 in)
- Weight: 66 kg (146 lb)

Cycling career
- Sport: Cycling
- Current team: Mazowsze Serce Polski
- Discipline: Road
- Role: Rider

Amateur teams
- 2012: KTK Kalisz
- 2014: Telco'm–Gimex

Professional teams
- 2013: Team Wibatech–Brzeg
- 2015–2017: CCC–Sprandi–Polkowice
- 2018–: Team Hurom

Jakub Kaczmarek (born 27 September 1993) is a Polish professional racing cyclist, who rides for UCI Continental team Mazowsze Serce Polski.

== Major results ==
2010
1st Road race, National Junior Road Championships
2015
8th Overall Course de Solidarność et des Champions Olympiques
2018
6th Overall Baltic Chain Tour
8th Overall Tour of Małopolska
9th Grand Prix Doliny Baryczy Milicz
10th Overall Course de Solidarność et des Champions Olympiques
2019
6th Overall Bałtyk–Karkonosze Tour
7th Overall Course de Solidarność et des Champions Olympiques
9th Puchar Ministra Obrony Narodowej
2020
1st Overall Tour of Szeklerland

1st Mountains classification
1st Stage 2

1st Overall Belgrade–Banja Luka

1st Stage 2

4th Road race, National Road Championships
5th Overall Tour de Serbie
7th Grand Prix Velo Alanya
2021
1st Overall Tour of Romania
4th Overall Szlakiem Grodów Piastowskich

1st Stage 3

Visegrad 4 Bicycle Race

4th Grand Prix Poland
6th GP Slovakia
7th GP Czech Republic
10th Kerékpárverseny

6th GP Adria Mobil
7th International Rhodes Grand Prix
8th Overall Tour of Bulgaria
2022
1st Overall Belgrade–Banja Luka

1st Stages 1 (TTT) & 3

Visegrad 4 Bicycle Race

2nd GP Czech Republic
7th Kerékpárverseny
7th GP Slovakia

7th Overall Tour of Bulgaria
9th Overall Tour of Małopolska
2023
2nd Overall Tour of Poyang Lake
5th Muur Classic Geraardsbergen
9th Overall Tour of Estonia
2024
Tour de Kurpie

1st Stage 3 (TTT)

8th Overall Tour of Małopolska
