= Paweł Franczak =

Polish bicycle racer

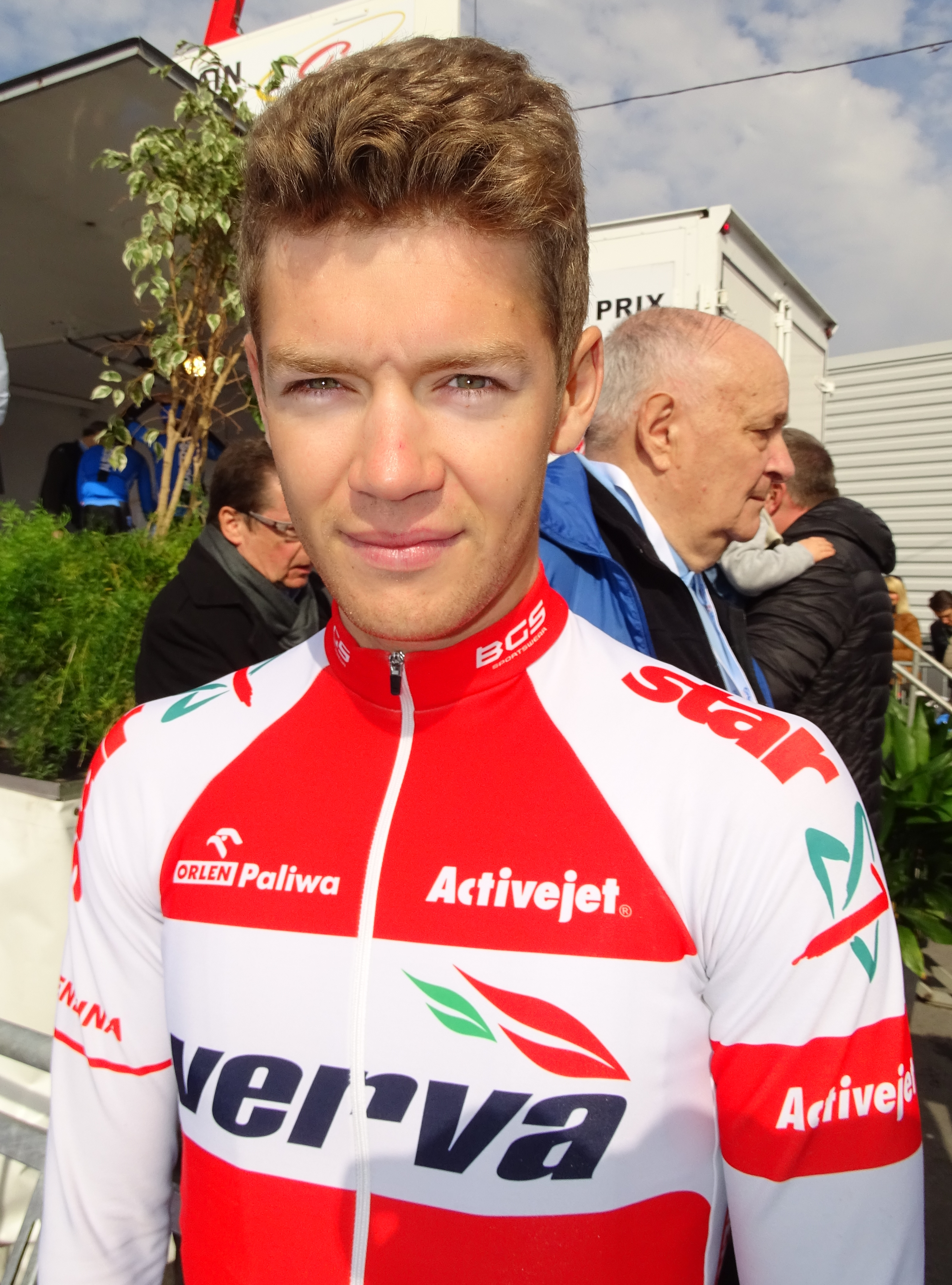
- Franczak at the 2016 Grand Prix de Denain

Personal information
- Full name: Paweł Franczak
- Born: 7 October 1991 (age 35) Nysa, Poland
- Height: 1.78 m (5 ft 10 in)
- Weight: 63 kg (139 lb)

Cycling career
- Sport: Cycling
- Current team: Retired
- Discipline: Road
- Role: Rider

Professional teams
- 2013: Team Wibatech–Brzeg
- 2014–2016: ActiveJet
- 2017: Team Hurom
- 2018: CCC–Sprandi–Polkowice
- 2019–2021: Voster ATS Team

Paweł Franczak (born 7 October 1991) is a Polish former professional cyclist, who rode professionally between 2013 and 2021 for Team Wibatech–Brzeg, Verva ActiveJet, Team Hurom, CCC–Sprandi–Polkowice and the Voster ATS Team. During his career, he took one professional victory – the general classification at the 2019 Belgrade–Banja Luka.

== Major results ==
2011
5th Memoriał Andrzeja Trochanowskiego
2012
5th Memoriał Henryka Łasaka
8th Gran Premio San Giuseppe
2013
1st Stage 5 Carpathian Couriers Race
4th Road race, National Under-23 Road Championships
2014
1st Coupe des Carpathes
2nd Road race, National Road Championships
2nd Memoriał Henryka Łasaka
7th Overall Tour of Małopolska
9th Memoriał Andrzeja Trochanowskiego
2015
1st Points classification, Szlakiem Grodów Piastowskich
2nd Overall Course de la Solidarité Olympique
2nd Memoriał Andrzeja Trochanowskiego
9th Overall GP Liberty Seguros
2016
1st Memoriał Henryka Łasaka
Course de la Solidarité Olympique

1st Points classification
1st Stage 1

7th Clásica de Almería
7th Grand Prix de Denain
7th Eschborn–Frankfurt – Rund um den Finanzplatz
10th Overall Tour of Estonia
2017
3rd Overall Tour of Estonia
3rd GP Slovakia, Visegrad 4 Bicycle Race
4th Memoriał Andrzeja Trochanowskiego
9th Road race, UEC European Road Championships
2018
1st Stage 3a (TTT) Sibiu Cycling Tour
3rd Memoriał Andrzeja Trochanowskiego
4th Grand Prix Doliny Baryczy Milicz
4th Memorial Grundmanna I Wizowskiego
5th Grand Prix Alanya
5th GP Slovakia, Visegrad 4 Bicycle Race
2019
1st Overall Belgrade–Banja Luka
Visegrad 4 Bicycle Race

1st Kerekparverseny
2nd GP Slovakia
3rd GP Poland

Bałtyk–Karkonosze Tour

1st Stages 1 & 3

4th Road race, National Road Championships
5th Memoriał Andrzeja Trochanowskiego
2020
3rd Road race, National Road Championships
3rd GP Kranj
5th Puchar Ministra Obrony Narodowej
2021
7th GP Polski, Visegrad 4 Bicycle Race
