= Sylwester Janiszewski =

Polish cyclist

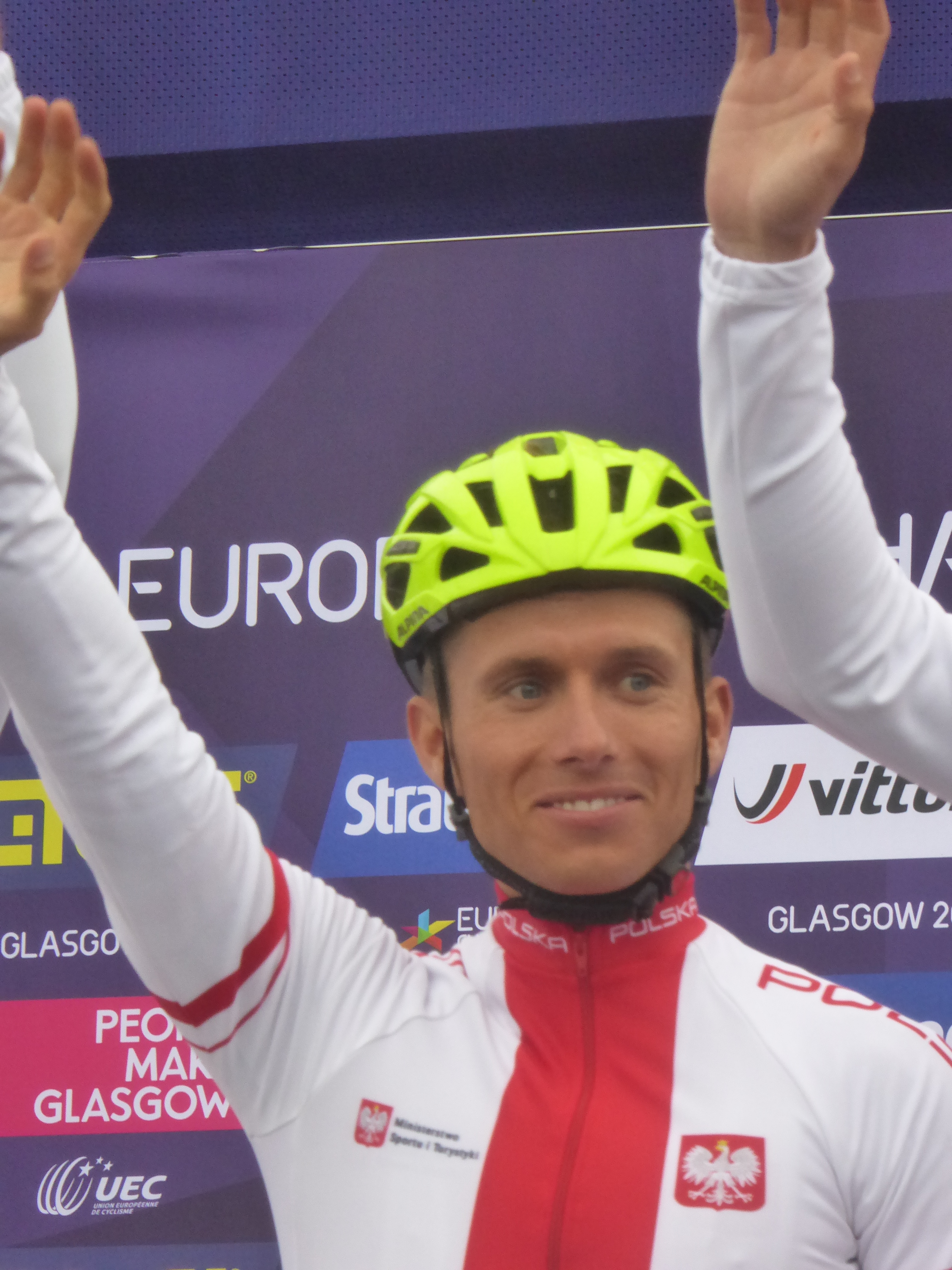
- Janiszewski at the 2018 European Road Cycling Championships

Personal information
- Full name: Sylwester Janiszewski
- Born: 24 January 1988 (age 38) Katowice, Poland
- Height: 1.65 m (5 ft 5 in)
- Weight: 65 kg (143 lb)

Cycling career
- Sport: Cycling
- Current team: Retired
- Discipline: Road
- Role: Rider

Professional teams
- 2008–2009: Legia–Felt
- 2010–2013: CCC–Polsat–Polkowice
- 2015–2018: Wibatech–Fuji
- 2019–2021: Voster ATS Team

Sylwester Janiszewski (born 24 January 1988) is a Polish former racing cyclist, who rode professionally for four teams between 2008 and 2013, and 2015 and 2021.

Janiszewski was suspended for testing positive to Androstenedione after winning the 2012 Memoriał Henryka Łasaka, and was stripped of his win. He won the Coupe des Carpathes the following day, but was allowed to retain the victory.

== Major results ==
2006
10th Junior race, UCI Cyclo-cross World Championships
2008
5th Overall Tour du Loir-et-Cher
7th Memoriał Henryka Łasaka
2009
5th Prague–Karlovy Vary–Prague
2010
2nd Szlakiem Grodów Piastowskich Criterium
6th Puchar Ministra Obrony Narodowej
7th Tour du Finistère
7th Tallinn–Tartu GP
9th Overall Szlakiem Walk Majora Hubala
2011
8th Puchar Ministra Obrony Narodowej
2012
1st Coupe des Carpathes
1st Prologue Dookoła Mazowsza
1st Stage 4 Bałtyk–Karkonosze Tour
3rd Road race, National Road Championships
3rd Memoriał Andrzeja Trochanowskiego

Voided results

~~1st Memoriał Henryka Łasaka~~
~~7th Puchar Ministra Obrony Narodowej~~

2015
1st Stage 4 Szlakiem Grodów Piastowskich
6th Memoriał Romana Siemińskiego
6th Memoriał Andrzeja Trochanowskiego
2016
2nd Memoriał Henryka Łasaka
3rd Road race, National Road Championships
4th Overall Dookoła Mazowsza
5th Puchar Ministra Obrony Narodowej
8th Memoriał Romana Siemińskiego
2017
1st Stage 4 Bałtyk–Karkonosze Tour
2nd Memoriał Henryka Łasaka
Visegrad 4 Bicycle Race

2nd GP Czech Republic
3rd Grand Prix Poland

3rd Overall East Bohemia Tour
3rd Memorial Grundmanna I Wizowskiego
3rd Puchar Ministra Obrony Narodowej
6th Race Horizon Park Classic
8th Coupe des Carpathes
2018
1st Course de Solidarność et des Champions Olympiques

1st Points classification
1st Stages 1 & 5

2nd Memoriał Andrzeja Trochanowskiego
5th Memorial Grundmanna I Wizowskiego
6th Grand Prix Poland, Visegrad 4 Bicycle Race
7th Road race, National Road Championships
7th Minsk Cup
8th Memoriał Romana Siemińskiego
9th Overall Okolo Jižních Čech
2019
1st Memorial Grundmanna I Wizowskiego
3rd Memoriał Romana Siemińskiego
4th Overall Course de Solidarność et des Champions Olympiques
7th Korona Kocich Gór
2020
1st Stage 4 Belgrade–Banja Luka
2nd Overall Course de Solidarność et des Champions Olympiques

1st Stage 4

6th GP Slovakia, Visegrad 4 Bicycle Race
