= Bartosz Warchoł =

Polish bicycle racer

Personal information
- Full name: Bartosz Warchoł
- Born: 16 January 1992 (age 34)

Cycling career
- Sport: Cycling
- Discipline: Road
- Role: Rider

Amateur team
- 2015: Whistle Team Ziemia Brzeska

Professional teams
- 2015: Cycling Academy
- 2016: Whirlpool–Author
- 2017: Team Hurom
- 2018–2019: Wibatech Merx 7R

Bartosz Warchoł (born 16 January 1992) is a Polish cyclist, who last rode for UCI Continental team Wibatech Merx 7R.

== Major results ==
2014
3rd Time trial, National Under-23 Road Championships
3rd Overall Peace Race U23
9th Overall Carpathian Couriers Race

1st Stage 4

10th Tour Bohemia
2015
Visegrad 4 Bicycle Race

1st GP Polski
6th GP Czech Republic

9th Overall Szlakiem Grodów Piastowskich
2016
5th GP Polski, Visegrad 4 Bicycle Race
10th Overall Course de Solidarność et des Champions Olympiques
10th Overall Czech Cycling Tour
2017
4th Overall Bałtyk–Karkonosze Tour
10th Korona Kocich Gór
2018
6th Overall Tour of Małopolska
