= Emanuel Piaskowy =

Polish cyclist

Personal information
- Full name: Emanuel Piaskowy
- Born: 2 March 1991 (age 35) Nowy Sącz, Poland
- Height: 1.72 m (5 ft 8 in)
- Weight: 60 kg (132 lb)

Cycling career
- Sport: Cycling
- Current team: Retired
- Discipline: Road
- Role: Rider

Professional teams
- 2014: ActiveJet
- 2015–2016: Cycling Academy
- 2017–2020: Team Hurom

Emanuel Piaskowy (born 2 March 1991) is a Polish former racing cyclist, who rode professionally between 2014 and 2020, for the ActiveJet, Cycling Academy and Mazowsze Serce Polski teams.

== Major results ==
2013
10th Overall Tour of Małopolska

1st Young rider classification

2014
3rd Road race, World University Cycling Championship
2015
4th Korona Kocich Gór
5th GP Polski, Visegrad 4 Bicycle Race
7th Overall Tour of Małopolska
7th Memorial Grundmanna I Wizowskiego
2016
2nd Hets Hatsafon
2017
3rd Road race, National Road Championships
3rd Overall Szlakiem Grodów Piastowskich
4th Korona Kocich Gór
8th Overall Bałtyk–Karkonosze Tour

1st Mountains classification

10th Overall Tour of Małopolska
2019
5th Overall Tour of Małopolska
2020
3rd Overall Tour de Serbie

1st Stage 2

4th Overall Belgrade–Banja Luka
