= Konrad Dąbkowski =

Polish bicycle racer

Personal information
- Full name: Konrad Dąbkowski
- Born: 16 February 1989 (age 37) Wyszków, Poland

Cycling career
- Sport: Cycling
- Current team: Retired
- Discipline: Road
- Role: Rider
- Rider type: Sprinter

Professional teams
- 2012–2013: BDC–Marcpol Team
- 2014–2015: ActiveJet

Konrad Dąbkowski (born 16 February 1989) is a Polish former racing cyclist.

== Major results ==
2006
3rd Team sprint, UEC European Junior Track Championships
2007
3rd Kilo, UEC European Junior Track Championships
2013
1st Memoriał Andrzeja Trochanowskiego
1st Stage 3 Course de la Solidarité Olympique
Les Challenges de la Marche Verte

4th GP Oued Eddahab
9th GP Al Massira

6th Jūrmala Grand Prix
7th Riga Grand Prix
2014
1st Puchar Ministra Obrony Narodowej
1st Stage 2 Memorial Grundmanna I Wizowskiego
1st Stage 1 Course de la Solidarité Olympique
5th Visegrad 4 Bicycle Race – GP Polski
2015
2nd Memoriał Romana Siemińskiego
3rd Puchar Ministra Obrony Narodowej
