= Kamil Zieliński =

Polish cyclist

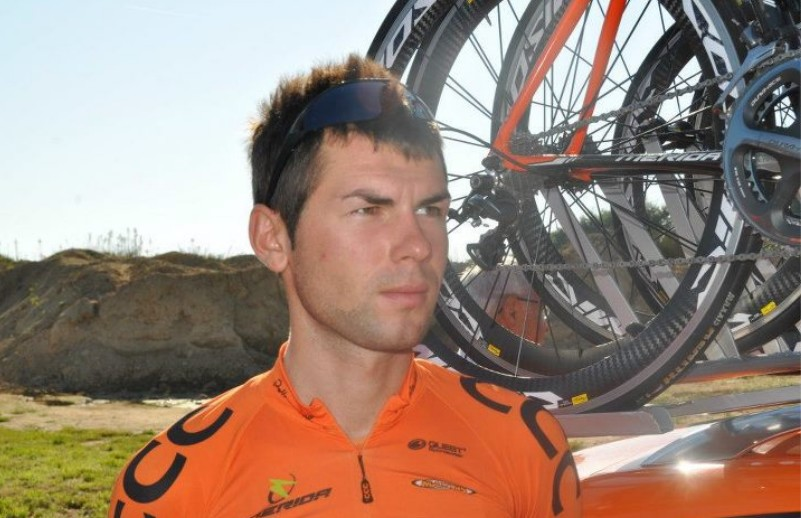
- Zieliński in 2012

Personal information
- Full name: Kamil Zieliński
- Born: 3 March 1988 (age 38) Ostrowiec Świętokrzyski, Poland

Cycling career
- Sport: Cycling
- Discipline: Road
- Role: Rider

Professional teams
- 2009–2012: CCC–Polsat–Polkowice
- 2013–2017: Las Vegas Power Energy Drink
- 2018–2019: Team Hurom

Kamil Zieliński (born 3 March 1988) is a Polish professional racing cyclist, who last rode for UCI Continental team Hurom BDC Development. He wore the yellow jersey of general classification leader for one stage in the 2015 Tour de Pologne.

== Major results ==
2009
10th Overall Dookoła Mazowsza
2010
2nd Overall Carpathia Couriers Paths
5th Puchar Ministra Obrony Narodowej
2013
4th Overall Course de la Solidarité Olympique
10th Memoriał Andrzeja Trochanowskiego
2014
1st Overall Course de la Solidarité Olympique

1st Stage 4

2nd Memoriał Andrzeja Trochanowskiego
2nd Visegrad 4 Bicycle Race – GP Hungary
3rd Tour Bohemia
6th Overall Okolo Jižních Čech
10th Visegrad 4 Bicycle Race – GP Slovakia
2015
2nd Overall Podlasie Tour

1st Stage 1

3rd Korona Kocich Gór
5th Overall Tour of Małopolska
9th Overall Bałtyk–Karkonosze Tour

1st Stage 6

2016
5th Korona Kocich Gór
6th Puchar Ministra Obrony Narodowej
7th Overall Course de la Solidarité Olympique
9th Memorial Grundmanna I Wizowskiego
10th Overall Bałtyk–Karkonosze Tour
10th Memoriał Andrzeja Trochanowskiego
2017
1st Overall East Bohemia Tour

1st Points classification
1st Stage 2

Visegrad 4 Bicycle Race

1st GP Hungary
1st GP Polski

1st Stage 5 Course de Solidarność et des Champions Olympiques
2nd Overall Szlakiem Walk Majora Hubala

1st Points classification
1st Stage 2 (ITT)

8th Overall Tour of Małopolska

1st Stage 1

9th Overall Bałtyk–Karkonosze Tour
2018
1st Stage 1 Szlakiem Walk Majora Hubala
4th Overall Course de Solidarność et des Champions Olympiques
2019
1st Mountains classification Bałtyk–Karkonosze Tour
