= Marceli Bogusławski =

Polish cyclist

Personal information
- Born: 7 September 1997 (age 29) Opoczno, Poland
- Height: 1.83 m (6 ft 0 in)
- Weight: 77 kg (170 lb)

Cycling career
- Sport: Cycling
- Current team: ATT Investments
- Disciplines: Road; Cyclo-cross; Cross-country
- Role: Rider

Professional teams
- 2018–2020: Wibatech Merx 7R
- 2021–2022: Mazowsze Serce Polski
- 2022: Team BikeExchange–Jayco (stagiaire)
- 2023–2024: Alpecin–Deceuninck Development Team
- 2025–: ATT Investments

Marceli Bogusławski (born 7 September 1997) is a Polish cyclist, who currently rides for UCI Continental team ATT Investments.

== Major results ==
=== Road ===
2018
7th Overall Dookoła Mazowsza
2019
1st Prologue Carpathian Couriers Race
7th GP Slovakia, Visegrad 4 Bicycle Race
2020
1st Prologue Tour Bitwa Warszawska 1920
2021
1st Prologue Tour of Bulgaria
1st Prologue International Tour of Rhodes
4th Overall Tour of Estonia

1st Mountains classification

2022 (2 pro wins)
1st Overall Dookoła Mazowsza

1st Points classification
1st Stage 1

1st Grand Prix Nasielsk-Serock
1st Grand Prix Poland
1st Stage 1 Tour of Thailand
1st Stage 1 Dookoła Mazowsza
2nd Grand Prix Wyszków
4th Puchar MON
10th Overall Belgrade Banjaluka

1st Stage 1 (TTT)

2023 (1)
1st Prologue Tour du Pays de Montbéliard
1st Stage 5 Course de Solidarność et des Champions Olympiques
1st Stage 4b (ITT) Sibiu Cycling Tour
2025 (1)
1st Overall Course Cycliste de Solidarnosc et des Champions Olympiques

1st Points classification
1st Stage 3

1st Memoriał Andrzeja Trochanowskiego
1st Prologue Istrian Spring Tour
1st Stages 4 & 5 Tour Battle of Warsaw
3rd Overall Tour of Estonia

1st Stage 1

3rd Ślężański Mnich VeloBank Bruki & Szutry
4th Overall Tour du Loir-et-Cher

1st Points classification
1st Stages 3 & 4

4th Fyen Rundt
4th Umag Classic
2026 (2)
1st Overall Tour of Estonia

1st Stage 2

1st Overall Tour du Loir-et-Cher
1st Overall Course Cycliste de Solidarnosc et des Champions Olympiques

1st Points classification
1st Stages 1a, 1b & 2

4th Poreč Classic

=== Cyclo-cross ===
2013–2014
1st National Junior Championships
2014–2015
2nd National Junior Championships
2015–2016
2nd National Championships
2016–2017
3rd National Championships

=== MTB ===
2014
1st National Junior XCO Championships
2016
1st National Under-23 XCO Championships
