= Norbert Banaszek =

Polish cyclist

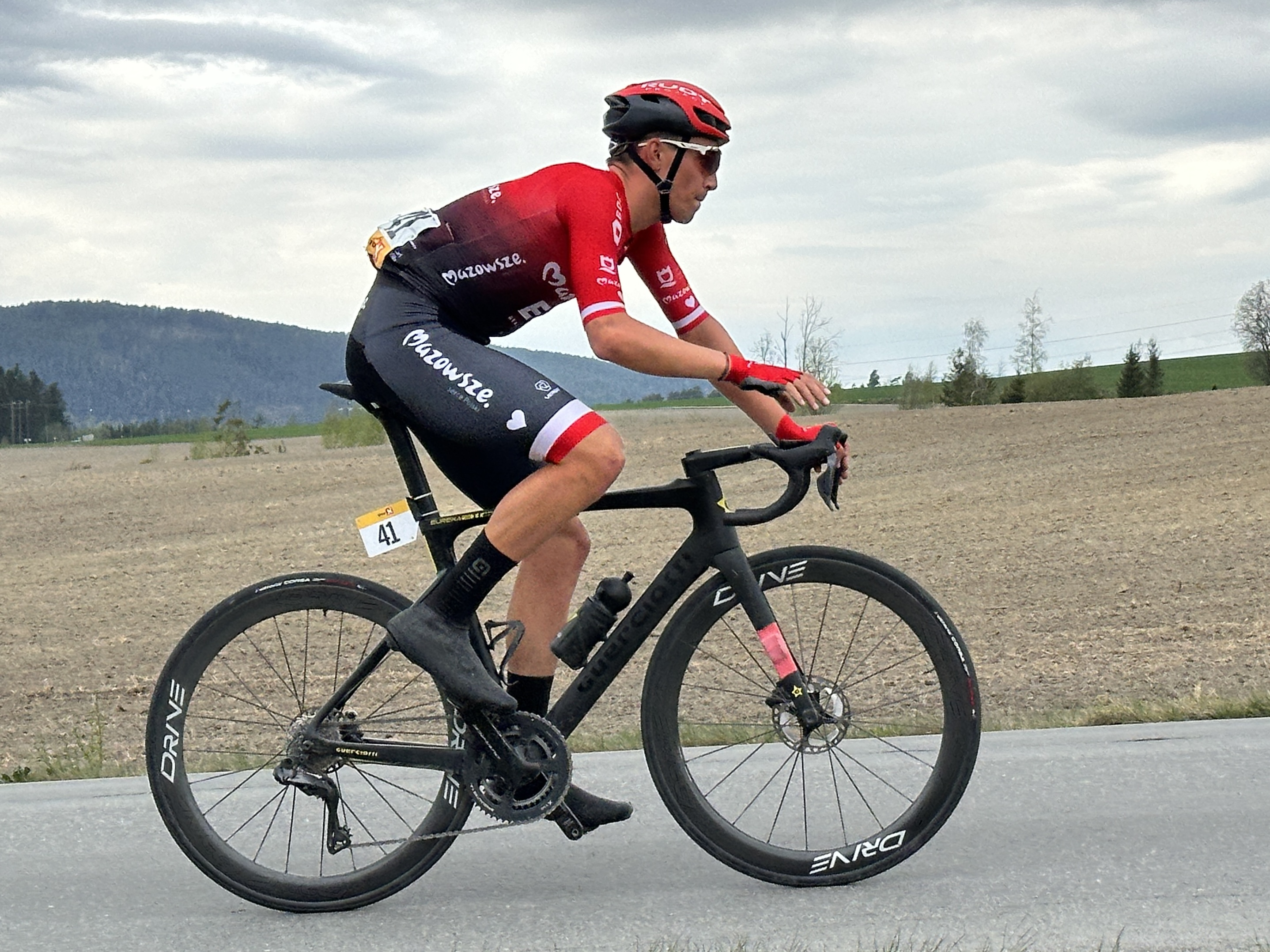
- Banaszek in 2024

Personal information
- Full name: Norbert Banaszek
- Born: 18 June 1997 (age 29) Warsaw, Poland
- Height: 1.89 m (6 ft 2 in)
- Weight: 75 kg (165 lb)

Cycling career
- Sport: Cycling
- Current team: Mazowsze Serce Polski
- Discipline: Road
- Role: Rider

Professional teams
- 2016: Verva ActiveJet
- 2017: Kolss Cycling Team
- 2018: Wibatech Merx 7R
- 2019–2024: Hurom BDC Development
- 2025–: ATT Investments

Major wins
- One-day races and Classics National Road Race Championships (2022, 2024)

Norbert Banaszek (born 18 June 1997) is a Polish cyclist, who currently rides for UCI Continental team Mazowsze Serce Polski. His brother Adrian Banaszek and cousin Alan Banaszek are also professional cyclists with the Mazowsze Serce Polski team.

== Major results ==
2015
7th Overall La Coupe du Président de la Ville de Grudziądz
2016
4th Memoriał Henryka Łasaka
2017
4th Road race, National Under-23 Road Championships
2018
7th Memoriał Henryka Łasaka
2019
3rd Puchar Ministra Obrony Narodowej
8th Overall Dookoła Mazowsza
2020
1st Overall In the footsteps of the Romans

1st Stage 1

1st Stage 4 Tour of Bulgaria
2021
4th Overall Baltic Chain Tour

1st Sprints classification

5th Overall Tour of Szeklerland
2022
1st Road race, National Road Championships
1st Stage 1 (TTT) Belgrade–Banja Luka
2023
1st Mountains classification, Tour d'Eure-et-Loir
3rd Memoriał Andrzeja Trochanowskiego
4th Overall Tour of Taihu Lake
4th GP Polski
5th Road race, National Road Championships
5th GP Adria Mobil
7th Overall Course de Solidarność et des Champions Olympiques
7th Ronde van de Achterhoek
2024
1st Road race, National Road Championships
1st Memoriał Andrzeja Trochanowskiego
3rd Overall Tour de Kurpie

1st Stage 3 (TTT)

4th Overall Tour Battle of Warsaw

1st Stage 1

10th Puchar MON
2025
1st Grand Prix Poland
1st Ślężański Mnich VeloBank Bruki & Szutry
7th Memoriał Andrzeja Trochanowskiego
