= GP Gorenjska =

Slovenian one-day road cycling race

Race details
- Date: Late May
- Discipline: Road
- Competition: UCI Europe Tour
- Type: One-day race

History
- First edition: 2021
- Editions: 4 (as of 2024)
- First winner: Mirco Maestri (ITA)
- Most wins: No repeat winners
- Most recent: Michal Schuran (CZE)

GP Gorenjska, known as GP Slovenia in 2021, is an annual single-day road cycling race in Slovenia. The race is organized as a 1.2 event on the UCI Europe Tour.

== Winners ==
Year	Country	Rider	Team
2021	Italy	Mirco Maestri	Bardiani–CSF–Faizanè
2022	Poland	Patryk Stosz	Voster ATS Team
2023	Italy	Davide De Cassan	Cycling Team Friuli ASD
2024	Czech Republic	Michal Schuran	ATT Investments
