= Alan Banaszek =

Polish cyclist (born 1997)

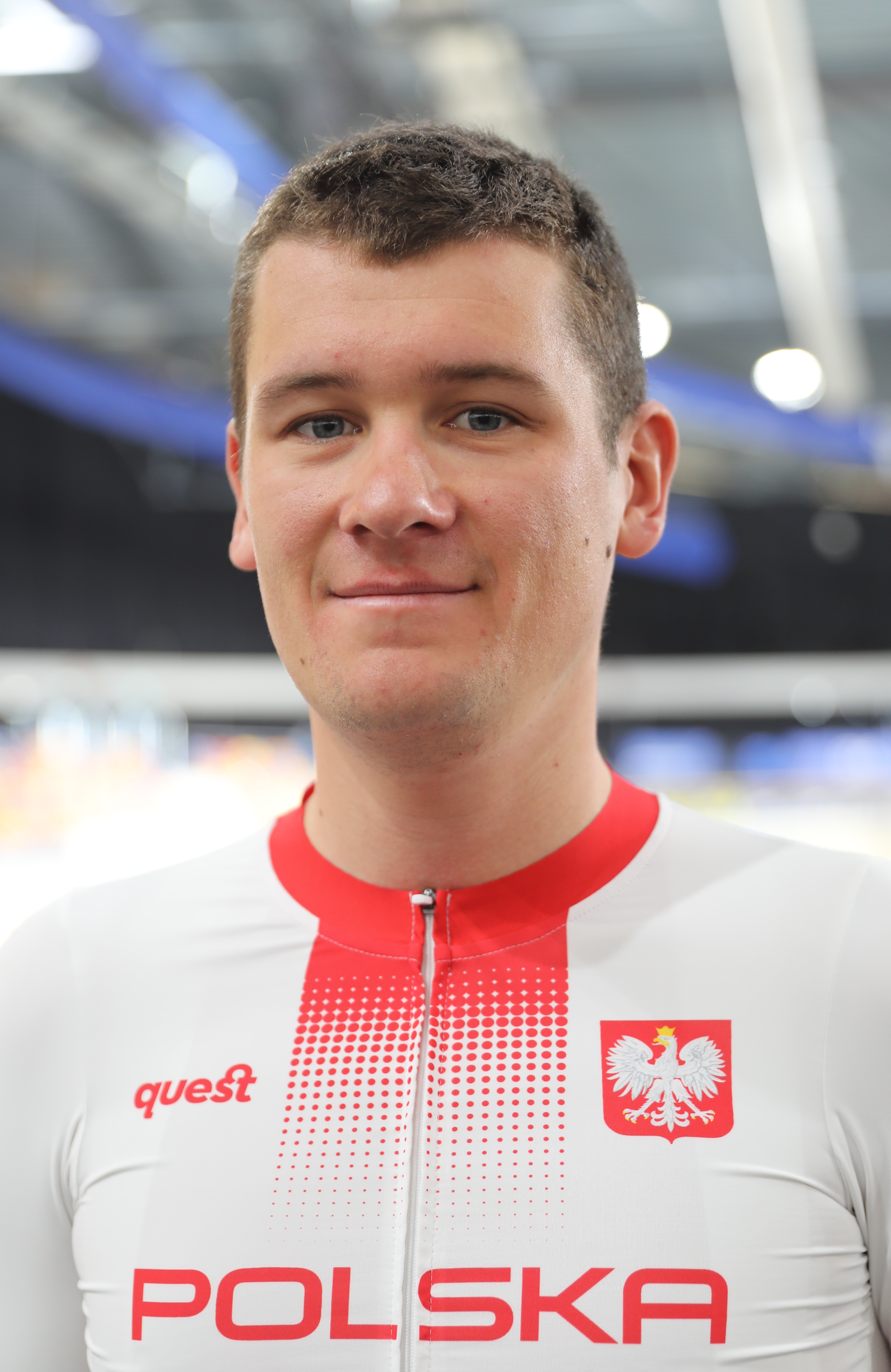
- Banaszek at the 2024 UEC European Track Championships

Personal information
- Full name: Alan Banaszek
- Born: 30 October 1997 (age 28) Warsaw, Poland
- Height: 1.81 m (5 ft 11 in)
- Weight: 75 kg (165 lb)

Cycling career
- Sport: Cycling
- Current team: Mazowsze Serce Polski
- Disciplines: Road; Track
- Role: Rider

Professional teams
- 2016–2018: CCC–Sprandi–Polkowice
- 2019: Caja Rural–Seguros RGA
- 2020–2022: Mazowsze Serce Polski
- 2023: Human Powered Health
- 2024: Mazowsze Serce Polski
- 2025–: ATT Investments

Major wins
- One-day races and Classics National Road Race Championships (2023)
Medal record
Representing Poland
Men's track cycling
European Championships
| Gold medal – first place | 2017 Berlin | Points race |
| Gold medal – first place | 2021 Grenchen | Omnium |
Men's road bicycle racing
European Championships
| Gold medal – first place | 2015 Tartu | Junior road race |

Alan Banaszek (born 30 October 1997) is a Polish cyclist, who currently rides for UCI Continental team Mazowsze Serce Polski. His cousins Adrian Banaszek and Norbert Banaszek are also professional cyclists with the Mazowsze Serce Polski team.

== Major results ==
=== Road ===
2014
2nd Overall Coupe du Président de la Ville de Grudziądz

1st Stage 4

2015
1st Road race, UEC European Junior Road Championships
2016
4th Puchar Ministra Obrony Narodowej
6th Overall Dookoła Mazowsza
6th Münsterland Giro
10th Road race, UCI Under-23 Road World Championships
2017
1st International Rhodes Grand Prix
1st Memorial Grundmanna I Wizowskiego
1st Memoriał Henryka Łasaka
Course de la Solidarité Olympique

1st Points classification
1st Stage 2

1st Stage 3 CCC Tour – Grody Piastowskie
2nd Memoriał Romana Siemińskiego
6th Memoriał Andrzeja Trochanowskiego
9th Nokere Koerse
2018
2nd GP Slovakia
3rd Memoriał Romana Siemińskiego
10th GP Poland
2020
1st Grand Prix Side
1st Stage 1 Tour of Bulgaria
3rd Grand Prix Gazipasa
4th Grand Prix Alanya
8th Overall In the footsteps of the Romans
2021
1st Overall Tour of Szeklerland

1st Points classification
1st Stage 2

1st GP Slovakia
1st Stages 1 & 4 Tour de Serbie
2nd Road race, National Road Championships
2nd GP Manavgat
3rd Grand Prix Gazipaşa
4th Trofej Umag
4th Overall Course Cycliste de Solidarnosc et des Champions Olympiques

1st Points classification

4th Overall Dookoła Mazowsza
7th Paris–Chauny
2022
1st Overall Tour of Thailand

1st Points classification
1st Stage 2

Belgrade–Banja Luka

1st Points classification
1st Stages 1 (TTT) & 4

3rd Overall Dookoła Mazowsza
4th Overall Tour of Romania
8th Overall Course de Solidarność et des Champions Olympiques
9th Memoriał Andrzeja Trochanowskiego
2023
1st Road race, National Road Championships
4th Memoriał Andrzeja Trochanowskiego
2024
1st Overall Tour Battle of Warsaw

1st Stage 3

1st Stage 3 (TTT) Tour de Kurpie
5th Overall Tour of Estonia
6th Overall Dookoła Mazowsza

1st Stage 4

=== Track ===
2016
3rd Madison (with Daniel Staniszewski), UEC European Under-23 Track Championships
2017
1st Points race, UEC European Championships
2019
National Championships

1st Points race
1st Elimination race

2020
1st Points race, National Championships
2021
1st Omnium, UEC European Championships
National Championships

1st Points race
1st Scratch
1st Madison (with Daniel Staniszewski)
1st Omnium
1st Team pursuit

2nd Elimination race, UCI Champions League, London
