= ATT Investments =

Czech cycling team

Team information
- UCI code: TLT (2020); TFA (2021); ATT (2022–)
- Registered: Czech Republic (2011–)
- Founded: 2011
- Status: Domestic (2011–2019); UCI Continental (2020–)
- Bicycles: Lapierre
- Website: Team home page

Key personnel
- General manager: Radim Kijevský
- Team manager: Jaromír Friede

Team name history
- 2011–2016 2017–2020 2021 2022–: Lawi–Author; Topforex–Lapierre; Topforex–ATT Investments; ATT Investments

ATT Investments (UCI team code: ATT) is a UCI Continental road bicycle racing team based in the Czech Republic. It was formed in 2011 and spent several years as a domestic team before being promoted to UCI Continental level in 2020.

== Team roster ==
As of 26 August 2025

Rider	Date of birth
Alan Banaszek (POL)	30 October 1997 (age 28)
Norbert Banaszek (POL)	18 June 1997 (age 29)
Martin Bárta (CZE)	22 May 2005 (age 21)
Jan Bittner (CZE)	23 June 2005 (age 21)
Marceli Bogusławski (POL)	7 September 1997 (age 28)
Marcin Budziński (POL)	24 April 1998 (age 28)
Dominik Dunár (SVK)	30 August 2005 (age 21)
Matyáš Fiala (CZE)	15 March 2003 (age 23)
Michael Kukrle (CZE)	17 November 1994 (age 31)
Alberto Monti (CZE)	23 February 2004 (age 22)

Rider	Date of birth
Dominik Neuman (CZE)	23 October 1995 (age 30)
Barnabás Peák (HUN)	29 November 1998 (age 27)
Piotr Pękala (POL)	4 August 1998 (age 28)
Jiří Pospíšil (CZE)	11 July 2005 (age 21)
Filip Řeha (CZE)	12 March 2001 (age 25)
Jakub Říman (CZE)	23 November 2000 (age 25)
Daniel Turek (CZE)	19 January 1993 (age 33)
Šimon Vaníček (CZE)	1 October 1999 (age 26)
Martin Voltr (CZE)	27 December 2001 (age 24)

== Major results ==
2020
Czech Republic National U23 Road Race Championships, Vojtěch Řepa
Overall Tour of Małopolska, Vojtěch Řepa
2022
Stage 3 International Tour of Rhodes, Miká Heming
Stage 2 Carpathian Couriers Race, Miká Heming
Stage 2 Gemenc Grand Prix, Tomáš Bárta
2023
Overall South Aegean Tour, Jakub Otruba
Overall Tour of Małopolska, Márton Dina

Prologue & Stage 3, Márton Dina
Stage 1, Tomáš Jakoubek

Czech Republic National Time Trial Championships, Jakub Otruba
Slovakia National Time Trial Championships, Matúš Štoček
Slovakia National Road Race Championships, Matúš Štoček
Stage 2 Course de Solidarność et des Champions Olympiques, Tomáš Jakoubek
Overall Tour of Bulgaria, Michal Schuran
2024
Silesian Classic, Jakub Otruba
Stage 5 International Tour of Hellas, Bartosz Rudyk
GP Gorenjska, Michal Schuran
Prologue & Stage 1 Tour of Małopolska, Márton Dina
Slovakia National U23 Time Trial Championships, Matthias Schwarzbacher
Czech Republic National U23 Road Race Championships, Matyáš Fiala
Stage 2 Dookoła Mazowsza, Bartosz Rudyk
Prologue West Bohemia Tour, Matthias Schwarzbacher
Stage 4 Tour of Bulgaria, Jakub Otruba
2025
International Rhodes Grand Prix, Marcin Budziński
Prologue Istrian Spring Trophy, Marceli Bogusławski
Stage 1 International Tour of Rhodes, Marcin Budziński
GP Brda-Collio, Marcin Budziński
Ślężański Mnich, Norbert Banaszek
Stages 3 & 4 Tour du Loir-et-Cher, Marceli Bogusławski
Silesian Beskid Race, Marcin Budziński
Stage 1 Tour of Estonia, Marceli Bogusławski
Stage 2 Oberösterreich Rundfahrt, Marcin Budziński
Czech Republic National U23 Time Trial Championships, Jan Bittner
Overall Course de Solidarność et des Champions Olympiques, Marceli Bogusławski

Stage 3, Marceli Bogusławski

GP Poland, Norbert Banaszek
Memoriał Andrzeja Trochanowskiego, Marceli Bogusławski
Overall Dookoła Mazowsza, Šimon Vaníček

Stage 2, Šimon Vaníček

Overall Tour of Szeklerland, Dominik Neuman

Stages 1 & 2, Dominik Neuman

Overall Tour Battle of Warsaw, Martin Voltr

Stage 1, Martin Voltr
Stages 4 & 5, Marceli Bogusławski
