= Memoriał Henryka Łasaka =

Polish cycling race

Race details
- Date: Mid August
- Region: Lesser Poland Voivodeship and Silesian Voivodeship, Poland
- English name: Memorial of Henryk Lasak
- Local name: Memoriał im. Henryka Łasaka (in Polish)
- Discipline: Road race
- Competition: UCI Europe Tour
- Type: Single-day

History
- First edition: 1999
- Editions: 25 (as of 2023)
- First winner: Cezary Zamana (POL)
- Most wins: Cezary Zamana (POL) (3 wins)
- Most recent: Michael Kukrle (CZE)

Memoriał Henryka Łasaka is a single-day road bicycle race held annually in August in Lesser Poland Voivodeship and Silesian Voivodeship, Poland. It was first held in 1999 and from 2005 to 2007, the race was organized as a 1.1 event on the UCI Europe Tour, before moving down to category 1.2. In 2020, the event was held on the national calendar.

== Winners ==
Year	Country	Rider	Team
1999	Poland	Cezary Zamana	
2000	Poland	Jacek Mickiewicz	
2001	Poland	Piotr Chmielewski	
2002	Poland	Cezary Zamana	
2003	Poland	Cezary Zamana	
2004	Poland	Robert Radosz	
2005	Poland	Marek Maciejewski	
2006	Czech Republic	Petr Benčík	
2007	Poland	Krzysztof Jeżowski	
2008	Poland	Krzysztof Jeżowski	
2009	Germany	Stefan Schäfer	
2010	Poland	Mariusz Witecki	Mróz-Active Jet
2011	Slovenia	Luka Mezgec	Sava
2012	Poland	Sylwester Janiszewski	CCC–Polkowice
2013	France	Florian Sénéchal	Etixx–IHNed
2014	Poland	Maciej Paterski	CCC–Polsat–Polkowice
2015	Czech Republic	Alois Kaňkovský	Whirlpool–Author
2016	Poland	Paweł Franczak	Verva ActiveJet
2017	Poland	Alan Banaszek	CCC–Sprandi–Polkowice
2018	Poland	Mateusz Grabis	Voster ATS Team
2019	Estonia	Norman Vahtra	Klubi Cycling Tartu
2020	Poland	Marcin Budziński	Wibatech Merx 7R
2021	Czech Republic	Michael Kukrle	Elkov–Kasper
2022	Poland	Tomasz Budziński	HRE Mazowsze Serce Polski
2023	Czech Republic	Michael Kukrle	Team Felbermayr–Simplon Wels
