= Paweł Bernas =

Polish cyclist (born 1990)

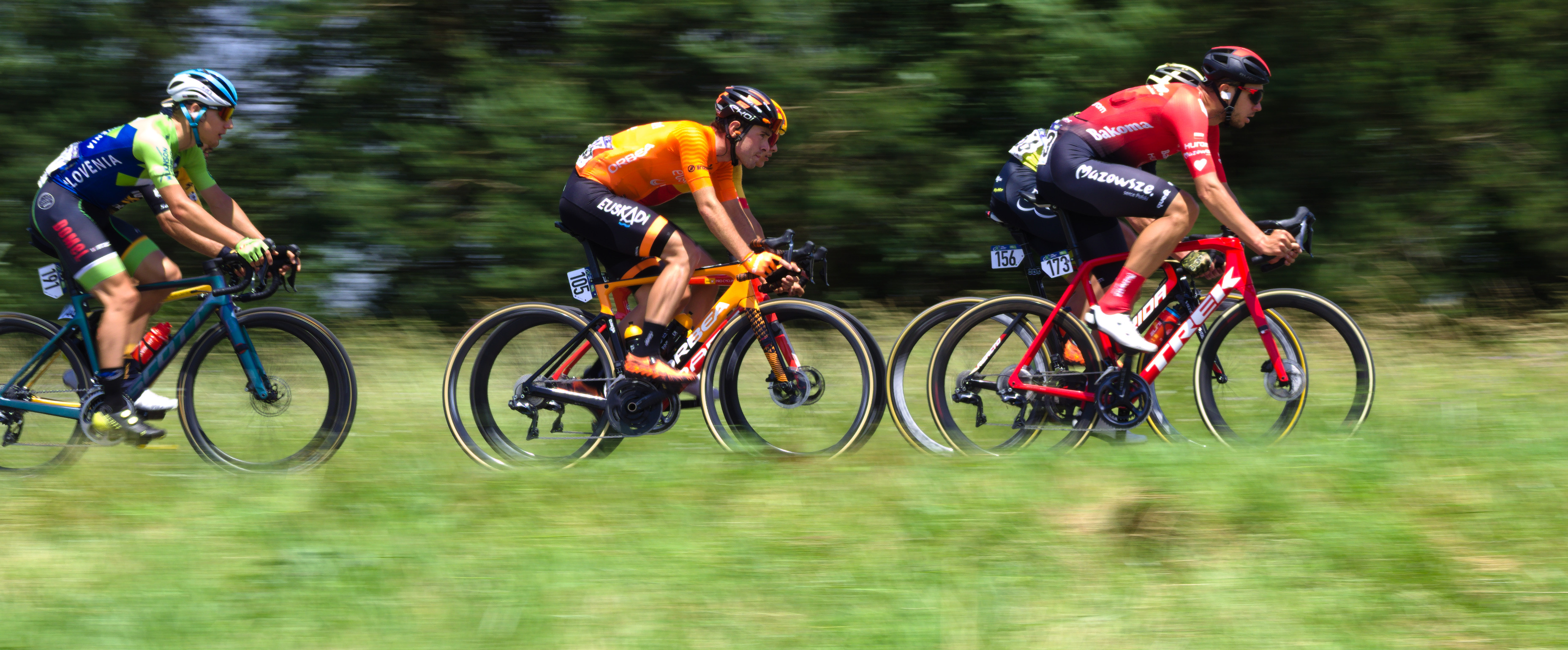
- Bernas (red jersey) at the 2021 Tour of Slovenia

Personal information
- Full name: Paweł Bernas
- Born: 24 May 1990 (age 36) Gliwice, Poland
- Height: 1.9 m (6 ft 3 in)
- Weight: 77 kg (170 lb)

Cycling career
- Sport: Cycling
- Current team: Mazowsze Serce Polski
- Discipline: Road
- Role: Rider
- Rider type: Rouleur

Amateur teams
- 2011: GKS Cartusia Kartuzy
- 2022: Cryospace Świętokrzyskie Cycling Academy

Professional teams
- 2013–2014: BDC–Marcpol Team
- 2015–2016: ActiveJet
- 2017: Domin Sport
- 2018: CCC–Sprandi–Polkowice
- 2019: CCC Team
- 2020–2021: Mazowsze Serce Polski
- 2024–: Mazowsze Serce Polski

Paweł Bernas (born 24 May 1990) is a Polish racing cyclist, who currently rides for UCI Continental team Mazowsze Serce Polski. He rode at the 2014 UCI Road World Championships. In August 2019, he was named in the startlist for the 2019 Vuelta a España.

== Major results ==
2011
1st Overall Carpathian Couriers Race
10th Memoriał Andrzeja Trochanowskiego
2012
National Under-23 Road Championships

2nd Road race
2nd Time trial

6th Tour Bohemia
8th Overall Okolo Jižních Čech
2013
3rd Overall Dookoła Mazowsza

1st Stage 4 (TTT)

Les Challenges de la Marche Verte

5th GP Sakia El Hamra
8th GP Al Massira
9th GP Oued Eddahab

7th Coupe des Carpathes
2014
1st GP Slovakia
1st GP Hungary
2nd Overall Tour of Małopolska
4th Overall Tour of China I

1st Stage 1

5th Overall Course de la Solidarité Olympique
6th Overall Memorial Grundmanna I Wizowskiego
7th Overall Okolo Slovenska
2015
1st Overall Volta ao Alentejo

1st Stage 4

1st Overall Szlakiem Grodów Piastowskich

1st Stage 3

1st GP Czech Republic
2nd Overall GP Sudoeste e Costa Vicentina

1st Points classification
1st Stage 1

3rd Road race, National Road Championships
2017
2nd Overall Tour of Małopolska
2nd Puchar Uzdrowisk Karpackich
4th Overall Szlakiem Grodów Piastowskich
4th Szlakiem Wielkich Jezior
5th Memoriał Romana Siemińskiego
6th Overall Course de Solidarność et des Champions Olympiques
6th Overall Bałtyk–Karkonosze Tour
8th Grand Prix Poland
8th Memoriał Andrzeja Trochanowskiego
8th GP Slovakia
9th Overall Szlakiem Walk Majora Hubala
2018
2nd Great War Remembrance Race
6th Grote Prijs Stad Zottegem
7th Grand Prix Doliny Baryczy Milicz
9th Overall Szlakiem Grodów Piastowskich
2019
8th Ronde van Drenthe
2020
1st Grand Prix Alanya
1st Sprints classification, Sibiu Cycling Tour
1st Stage 4 Giro della Regione Friuli Venezia Giulia
2nd Grand Prix Velo Alanya
3rd Overall International Tour of Rhodes
3rd Overall Dookoła Mazowsza
7th Overall Course de Solidarność et des Champions Olympiques
2021
1st Mountains classification, Alpes Isère Tour
1st Sprints classification, Sibiu Cycling Tour
8th Overall Szlakiem Grodów Piastowskich
9th Overall International Tour of Rhodes
2023
UCI Gravel World Series

3rd Gravel Adventure

=== Grand Tour general classification results timeline ===
Grand Tour	2019
Giro d'Italia	—
Tour de France	—
Vuelta a España	149

Legend
—	Did not compete
DNF	Did not finish
