= Verva ActiveJet =

Polish cycling team

Verva ActiveJet Pro Cycling Team

Team information
- UCI code: VAT
- Registered: Poland
- Founded: 2014
- Disbanded: 2016
- Discipline: Road
- Status: UCI Continental (2014–2015); UCI Professional Continental (2016)
- Bicycles: Trek
- Website: Team home page

Key personnel
- General manager: Piotr Kosmala

Team name history
- 2014–2015 2016: ActiveJet Team; Verva ActiveJet
Verva ActiveJet jersey
Jersey

Verva ActiveJet is a former Polish UCI Professional Continental cycling team, active between 2014 and 2016.

== Roster ==
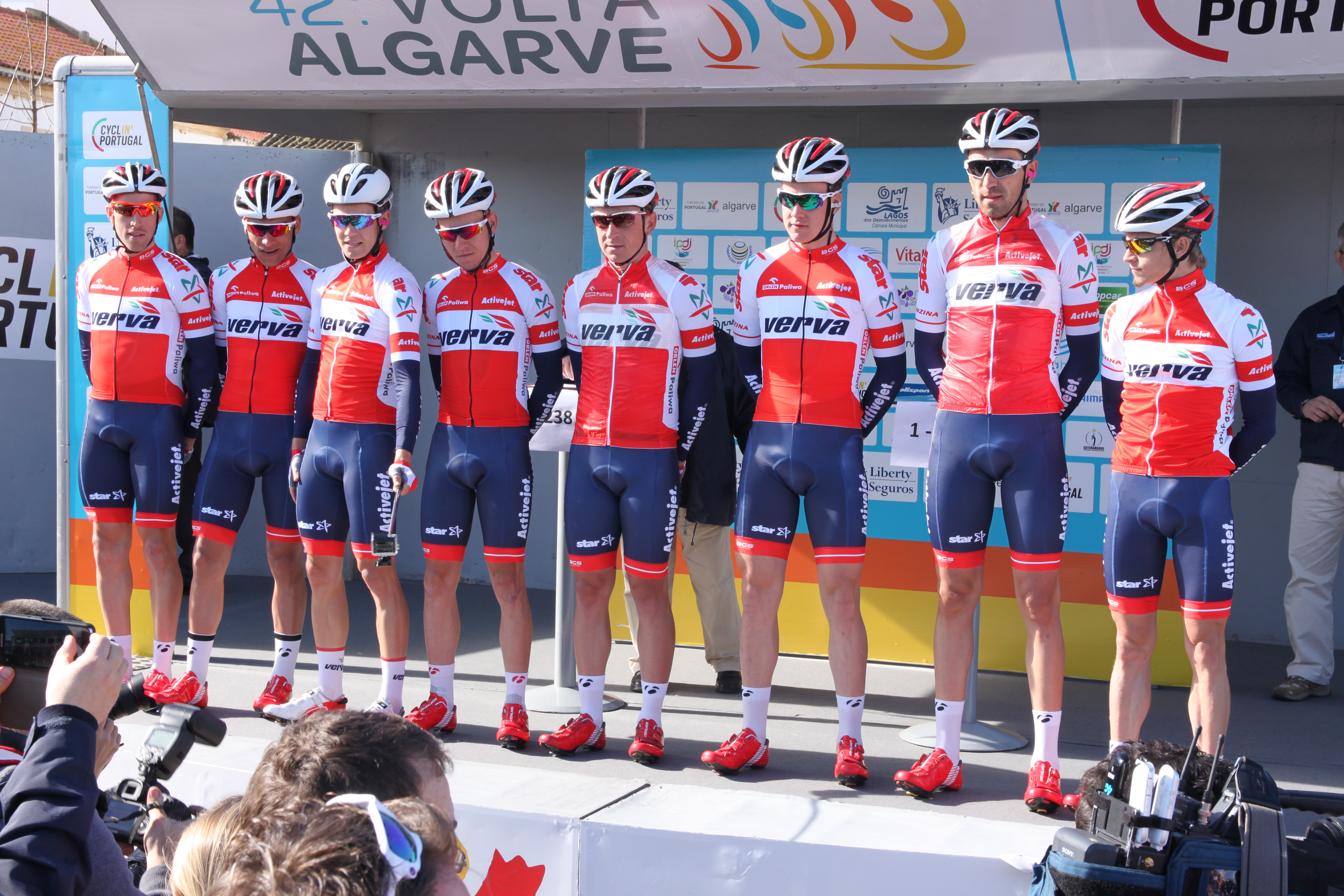
The team at the 2016 Volta ao Algarve

Roster in 2016:

- Stanislaw Aniolkowski (POL)
- Adrian Banaszek (POL)
- Norbert Banaszek (POL)
- Paweł Bernas (POL)
- Łukasz Bodnar (POL)
- Paweł Charucki (POL)
- Paweł Cieślik (POL)
- Paweł Franczak (POL)
- Kamil Gradek (POL)
- Karel Hník (CZE)
- Jonas Koch (GER)
- Jiří Polnický (CZE)
- Jordi Simón (ESP)
- Adam Stachowiak (POL)
- Daniel Staniszewski (POL)

== Major wins ==
2014
Stage 2 Memorial Grundmanna I Wizowskiego, Konrad Dąbkowski
Stage 1 Course de Solidarność et des Champions Olympiques, Konrad Dąbkowski
Puchar Uzdrowisk Karpackich, Paweł Franczak
Puchar Ministra Obrony Narodowej, Konrad Dąbkowski
2015
Stage 1 GP Liberty Seguros, Paweł Bernas
Overall Volta ao Alentejo, Paweł Bernas

Stage 4, Paweł Bernas

Overall Szlakiem Grodów Piastowskich, Paweł Bernas

Stage 3, Paweł Bernas

Visegrad 4 Bicycle Race – GP Czech Republic, Paweł Bernas
