= Voster Team =

Polish cycling team

Team information
- UCI code: VOS
- Registered: Poland
- Founded: 2016
- Discipline: Road
- Status: UCI Continental
- Bicycles: Orbea
- Website: Team home page

Key personnel
- General manager: Mariusz Witecki
- Team managers: Anna Kowalczyk; Jacek Morajko; Mateusz Taciak

Team name history
- 2016 2017 2018–2025 2026–: Voster Cycling Team; Voster Uniwheels Team; Voster ATS Team; Voster Team

Voster Team is a Polish UCI Continental cycling team founded in 2016. It obtained a UCI Continental licence in 2017.

== Team roster ==
As of 22 June 2026.

Rider	Date of birth
Maciej Banaszak (POL)	11 October 2005 (age 20)
Paweł Bernas (POL)	24 May 1990 (age 36)
Konrad Czabok (POL)	19 March 2001 (age 25)
Felix Gębka (POL)	5 December 2008 (age 17)
Ignacy Golonko (POL)	1 July 2007 (age 19)
Szymon Ilski (POL)	27 August 2006 (age 20)
Jakub Kaczmarek (POL)	27 September 1993 (age 32)
Dawid Łątkowski (POL)	18 November 2005 (age 20)

Rider	Date of birth
Kacper Maciejuk (POL)	18 May 2003 (age 23)
Piotr Maślak (POL)	15 December 2003 (age 22)
Krzysztof Parma (POL)	8 March 1987 (age 39)
Tomáš Sivok (SVK)	24 February 2004 (age 22)
Patryk Stosz (POL)	15 July 1994 (age 32)
Konrad Waliniak (POL)	8 December 2004 (age 21)
Michał Żelazowski (POL)	6 August 2004 (age 22)

== Major wins ==
2017
Overall Course Cycliste de Solidarnosc et des Champions Olympiques, Mateusz Komar

Stage 4, Mateusz Komar

2019
Overall Belgrade Banjaluka, Paweł Franczak
Visegrad 4 Kerekparverseny, Paweł Franczak
Stages 1 & 3 Bałtyk–Karkonosze Tour, Paweł Franczak
Overall Tour of Małopolska, Adam Stachowiak

Stage 3, Adam Stachowiak

Grand Prix Doliny Baryczy migród - XXIX Memoria Grundmanna i Wizowskiego, Sylwester Janiszewski
2020
Overall Tour of Bulgaria, Patryk Stosz

Stage 2, Patryk Stosz

2021
Stage 2 Belgrade Banjaluka, Patryk Stosz
Stage 2 Tour of Małopolska, Patryk Stosz
Stage 1 Course de Solidarność et des Champions Olympiques, Patryk Stosz
Overall Szlakiem Grodów Piastowskich, Maciej Paterski

Stage 1, Patryk Stosz
Stage 2, Maciej Paterski

Stage 2 & 5 Tour of Romania, Patryk Stosz
Stage 4 Circuit des Ardennes, Patryk Stosz
2022
GP Adria Mobil, Maciej Paterski

== National champions ==
2021
Poland Road Race, Maciej Paterski
2026
Poland Road Race, Kacper Maciejuk
