= Tour Battle of Warsaw =

Race details
- Date: Mid-August
- Region: Masovian Voivodeship, Poland
- Local name(s): Tour Bitwa Warszawska (in Polish)
- Discipline: Road
- Competition: UCI Europe Tour
- Type: Stage race
- Organiser: Mazovia Team
- Race director: Dariusz Banaszek

History
- First edition: 2020
- Editions: 3 (as of 2025)
- First winner: Oscar Riesebeek (NED)
- Most recent: Martin Voltr (CZE)

Tour Battle of Warsaw (Polish: Tour Bitwa Warszawska) is an annual, professional men's multiple-stage cycling race in Masovian Voivodeship. Since its first edition in 2020 the race has been organised as a 2.2 event on the UCI Europe Tour.

== Winners ==
Year	Country	Rider	Team
2020	Netherlands	Oscar Riesebeek	Alpecin–Fenix
2021– 2023	No race		
2024	Poland	Alan Banaszek	Mazowsze Serce Polski
2025	Czech Republic	Martin Voltr	ATT Investments
