= Santic–Wibatech =

Polish cycling team

Wibatech Merx
Team information
- UCI code: SWT
- Registered: Poland (2012–2020); Germany (2021–)
- Founded: 2012
- Discipline: Road
- Status: UCI Continental (2012–2020; 2022–); Amateur (2021)

Key personnel
- General manager: Wieslaw Ciasnocha

Team name history
- 2012 2013 2014 2015–2016 2017 2018 2019–2020 2021 2022–: Wibatech–LMGK Ziemia Brzeska; Team Wibatech–Brzeg; Wibatech Fuji Żory; Wibatech–Fuji; Wibatech 7R Fuji; Wibatech Merx 7R; Wibatech Merx; Team Wibatech Bayern/RSV Passau; Santic–Wibatech

Santic–Wibatech is a German UCI Continental team founded in 2012. It participates in UCI Continental Circuits races. The team was formerly registered in Poland.

== Team roster ==
As of 6 December 2022.

Rider	Date of birth
Stefan Brandlmeier (GER)	7 January 1993 (age 33)
Patrick Haller (GER)	9 July 1997 (age 29)
Piotr Pekala (POL)	4 August 1998 (age 28)
Michael Peter (GER)	15 November 2001 (age 24)
Bartlomiej Proc (POL)	12 December 1999 (age 26)
Bartosz Rudyk (POL)	18 September 1998 (age 27)

Rider	Date of birth
Fabian Schormair (GER)	23 October 1994 (age 31)
Jonas Sonnleitner (GER)	27 August 1997 (age 29)
Ludwig Stadler (GER)	5 September 2001 (age 25)
Paweł Szóstka (POL)	9 July 1998 (age 28)
Tim Wollenberg (GER)	17 February 2000 (age 26)

== Major wins ==
2013
Stage 4 Carpathian Couriers Race U23, Paweł Franczak
2015
Stage 4 Szlakiem Grodòw Piastowskich, Sylwester Janiszewski
2016
Visegrad 4 Bicycle Race, Marek Rutkiewicz
Stage 1 Tour of Małopolska, Dariusz Batek
2018
Visegrad 4 Bicycle Race–GP Slovakia, Maciej Paterski
Visegrad 4 Bicycle Race–GP Poland, Maciej Paterski
Overall Tour of Estonia, Grzegorz Stępniak
Stage 1 Tour of Małopolska, Maciej Paterski
Overall Course Cycliste de Solidarnosc et des Champions Olympiques, Sylwester Janiszewski

1st Stages 1 & 5, Sylwester Janiszewski

Puchar Uzdrowisk Karpackich, Maciej Paterski
Minsk Cup, Maciej Paterski
Grand Prix Judendorf-Straßengel, Maciej Paterski
2019
Stage 3 Circuit des Ardennes International, Maciej Paterski
Prologue Carpathian Couriers Race, Marceli Bogusławski
Stages 2 & 3 CCC Tour – Grody Piastowskie, Maciej Paterski
Overall Wyscig Mjr. Hubala – Sante Tour, Maciej Paterski

Stage 1 & 2b, Grzegorz Stępniak
Stage 3, Maciej Paterski

Stage 1 Tour of Małopolska, Anatoliy Budyak
2020
Prologue Tour Bitwa Warszawska 1920, Marceli Bogusławski

== National Champions ==
2018
Poland Hill Climb, Maciej Paterski
