= Puchar Ministra Obrony Narodowej =

Race details
- Date: Mid-August
- Region: Masovian Voivodeship, Poland
- English name: Cup of the Minister of National Defence
- Local name: Puchar Ministra Obrony Narodowej (in Polish)
- Discipline: Road
- Competition: UCI Europe Tour
- Type: Single-day
- Organiser: Mazovia Team
- Race director: Marcin Wasiołek
- Web site: mazovia-team.pl/puchar-mon-nowy/

History
- First edition: 1958
- Editions: 64 (as of 2026)
- First winner: Adam Wiśniewski (POL)
- Most wins: Lechosław Michalak (POL); Uldis Ansons (URS); Bartłomiej Matysiak (POL) (3 wins)
- Most recent: Marceli Bogusławski (POL)

The Puchar Ministra Obrony Narodowej is a bicycle race held in Masovian Voivodeship, Poland. It was first held in 1958 and since 2005, the race has been organised as a 1.2 event on the UCI Europe Tour.

== Winners ==
Year	Country	Rider	Team
1958	Poland	Adam Wiśniewski	
1959	Poland	Janusz Paradowski	
1960	Poland	Jan Chtiej	
1961	Poland	Franciszek Kosela	
1962	Poland	Tadeusz Zadrożny	
1963	Poland	Zygfryd Widera	
1964	Poland	Ryszard Szałapski	
1965	Poland	Tadeusz Zadrożny	
1966	Poland	Zygmunt Hanusik	
1967	Czechoslovakia	Daniel Gráč	
1968	Poland	Stanisław Demel	
1969	Poland	Tadeusz Szpak	
1970	Poland	Zygmunt Hanusik	
1971	Poland	Zenon Czechowski	
1972	Poland	Stanisław Szozda	
1973	Czechoslovakia	Michal Klasa	
1974	Soviet Union	Vytautas Galinauskas	
1975	Soviet Union	Aleksandr Averin	
1976	Poland	Tadeusz Mytnik	
1977	Poland	Ryszard Szurkowski	
1978	Poland	Lechosław Michalak	
1979	Poland	Lechosław Michalak	
1980	Poland	Ryszard Szurkowski	
1981	Poland	Adam Zagajewski	
1982	Poland	Zbigniew Szczepkowski	
1983	Poland	Zbigniew Szczepkowski	
1984	Poland	Lechosław Michalak	
1985	Soviet Union	Vladimir Poulnikov	
1986	Soviet Union	Uldis Ansons	
1987	Soviet Union	Uldis Ansons	
1988	Soviet Union	Uldis Ansons	
1989	Poland	Grzegorz Rosoliński	
1990	Poland	Sławomir Krawczyk	
1991	Poland	Zbigniew Ludwiniak	
1992– 1994	No race		
1995	Poland	Przemysław Mikołajczyk	
1996	Poland	Mariusz Bilewski	
1997	Poland	Grzegorz Wajs	
1998	Poland	Przemysław Mikołajczyk	
1999	Poland	Grzegorz Rosoliński	
2000	Poland	Hubert Nowak	
2001	Poland	Kazimierz Stafiej	
2002	Lithuania	Raimondas Vilčinskas	
2003	Poland	Kazimierz Stafiej	Action Nvidia–Mróz
2004	Poland	Adam Wadecki	Action
2005	Poland	Grzegorz Żołędziowski	Legia-Bazyliszek
2006	Poland	Marcin Gębka	DHL–Author
2007	Estonia	Tarmo Raudsepp	Rietumu Banka–Riga
2008	Poland	Bartłomiej Matysiak	Legia
2009	Poland	Tomasz Kiendyś	CCC–Polsat–Polkowice
2010	Poland	Bartłomiej Matysiak	CCC–Polsat–Polkowice
2011	Poland	Tomasz Kiendyś	CCC–Polsat–Polkowice
2012	Poland	Damian Walczak	BDC–Marcpol Team
2013	Poland	Bartłomiej Matysiak	CCC–Polsat–Polkowice
2014	Poland	Konrad Dąbkowski	ActiveJet
2015	Slovakia	Erik Baška	AWT–GreenWay
2016	Czech Republic	Alois Kaňkovský	Whirlpool–Author
2017	Czech Republic	Alois Kaňkovský	Elkov–Author
2019	Estonia	Norman Vahtra	Klubi Cycling Tartu
2020	Germany	Felix Groß	Rad-Net Rose Team
2021	Denmark	Louis Bendixen	Team Coop
2022	Netherlands	Jesper Rasch	Abloc CT
2023	Poland	Bartosz Rudyk	Voster ATS Team
2024	Poland	Konrad Czabok	Mazowsze Serce Polski
2025	Poland	Bartłomiej Proć	Run & Race–Wibatech
2026	Poland	Marceli Bogusławski	ATT Investments
