= Mazowsze Serce Polski =

Polish cycling team

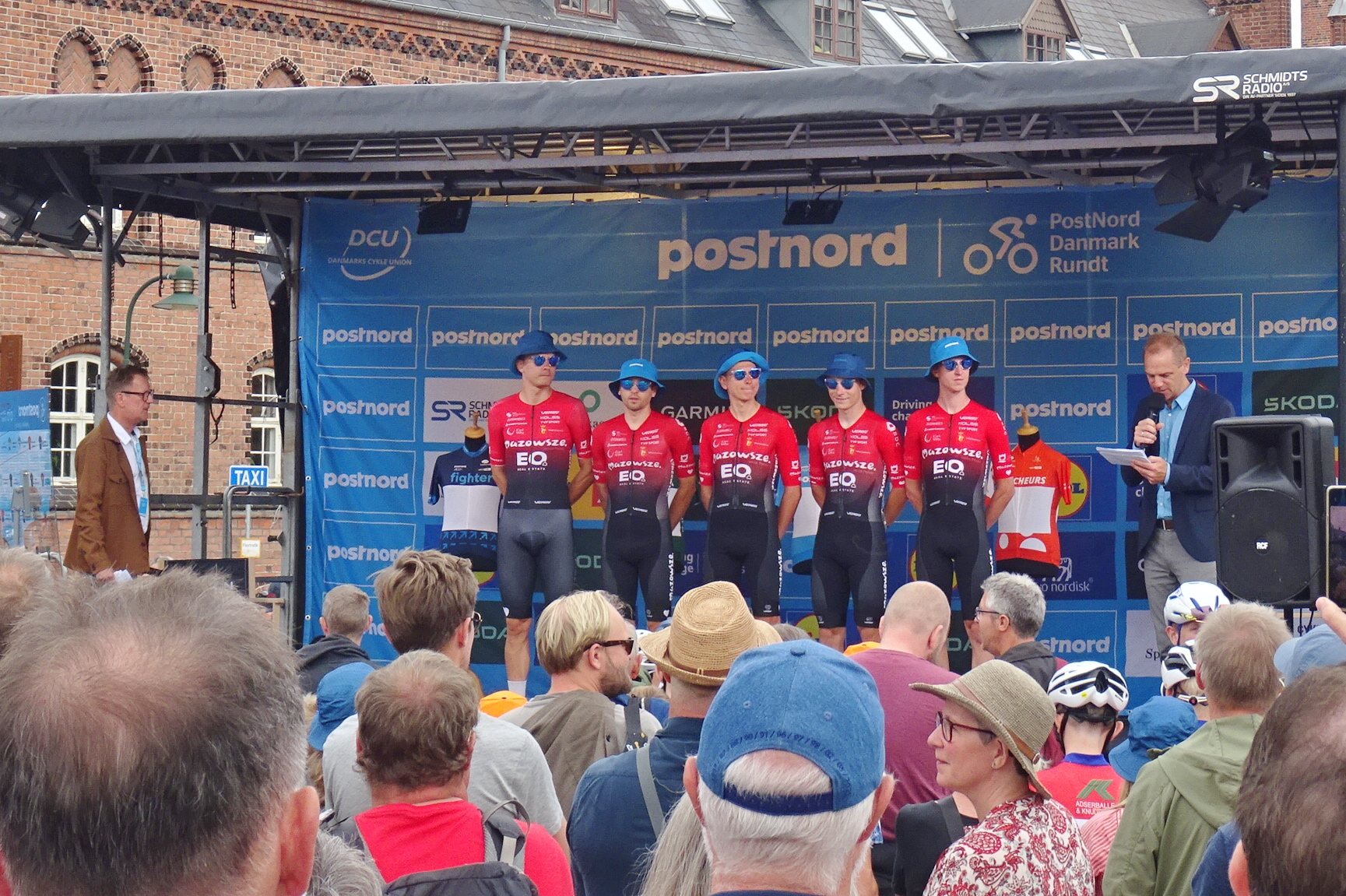

Team information
- UCI code: THU (2017–2019); MSP (2020–)
- Registered: Poland
- Founded: 2017
- Discipline: Road
- Status: UCI Continental (2017–)
- Bicycles: Trek
- Website: Team home page

Key personnel
- General manager: Dariusz Banaszek
- Team managers: Mirosław Kostro; Adrian Kucharek; Wojciech Pawłak; Marek Rutkiewicz

Team name history
- 2017–2018 2019 2020–2021 2021–2023 2024–: Team Hurom (THU); Hurom BDC Development (THU); Mazowsze Serce Polski (MSP); HRE Mazowsze Serce Polski (MSP); Mazowsze Serce Polski (MSP)

Mazowsze Serce Polski is a Polish UCI Continental cycling team founded in 2017.

On 12 May 2021, HRE Investments, a Polish real estate company, was announced as a co-title sponsor.

== Team roster ==
As of 22 March 2024.

Rider	Date of birth
Alan Banaszek (POL)	30 October 1997 (age 28)
Norbert Banaszek (POL)	18 June 1997 (age 29)
Paweł Bernas (POL)	24 May 1990 (age 36)
Marcin Budziński (POL)	24 April 1998 (age 28)
Tomasz Budziński (POL)	24 April 1998 (age 28)
Konrad Czabok (POL)	19 March 2001 (age 25)

Rider	Date of birth
Jakub Kaczmarek (POL)	27 September 1993 (age 32)
Kamil Lach (POL)	26 July 2003 (age 23)
Tobiasz Pawlak (POL)	24 November 1995 (age 30)
Michał Pomorski (POL)	4 August 2003 (age 23)
Maksymilian Radosz (POL)	25 September 2003 (age 22)
Kajetan Wąsowicz (POL)	3 June 2004 (age 22)

== Major results ==
2018
Stage 1 Szlakiem Walk Majora Hubala, Kamil Zieliński
Stage 2 Tour of Małopolska, Vitaliy Buts
2020
Grand Prix Alanya, Paweł Bernas
Grand Prix Manavgat-Side, Alan Banaszek
Overall In the footsteps of the Romans, Norbert Banaszek

Stage 1, Norbert Banaszek

Stage 1 Tour of Bulgaria, Alan Banaszek
Stage 4 Tour of Bulgaria, Norbert Banaszek
Overall Tour of Szeklerland, Jakub Kaczmarek

Prologue, Adrian Kurek
Stage 2, Jakub Kaczmarek

Stage 2 Tour of Serbia, Emanuel Piaskowy
Overall Belgrade–Banja Luka, Jakub Kaczmarek

Stage 2, Jakub Kaczmarek

Stage 4 Giro della Friuli Venezia Giulia, Paweł Bernas
2021
Stage 3 Istrian Spring Trophy, Mihkel Räim
Prologue International Tour of Rhodes, Marceli Bogusławski
Overall Belgrade–Banja Luka, Mihkel Räim

Stage 4, Mihkel Räim

Estonia National Road Race Championships, Mihkel Räim
Prologue Tour of Bulgaria, Marceli Bogusławski
Stage 3 Tour of Bulgaria, Mihkel Räim
GP Slovakia, Alan Banaszek
Overall Tour of Szeklerland, Alan Banaszek

Stage 2, Alan Banaszek

Stage 3 Szlakiem Grodów Piastowskich, Jakub Kaczmarek
Overall Tour of Romania, Jakub Kaczmarek
Stage 1 Tour de Serbie, Alan Banaszek
2022
Overall Tour of Thailand, Alan Banaszek

Stage 1, Marceli Boguslawski
Stage 2, Alan Banaszek

Overall Belgrade–Banja Luka, Jakub Kaczmarek

Stage 1 (TTT)
Stage 3, Jakub Kaczmarek
Stage 4, Alan Banaszek

Grand Prix Nasielsk-Serock, Marceli Bogusławski
Prologue Tour of Estonia, Marceli Bogusławski
Poland National U23 Time Trial Championships, Kacper Gieryk
Poland National Road Race Championships, Norbert Banaszek
Grand Prix Poland, Marceli Bogusławski
Overall Dookoła Mazowsza, Marceli Bogusławski

Stage 1, Marceli Bogusławski

Memorial Henryka Łasaka, Tomasz Budziński
Prologue & Stage 4 Tour of Bulgaria, Marceli Bogusławski

== National champions ==
2021
Estonia Road Race, Mihkel Räim
2022
Poland U23 Time Trial, Kacper Gieryk
Poland Road Race, Norbert Banaszek
