= Tour of Estonia =

Road bicycle racing stage race held in Estonia

Race details
- Date: May
- Region: Estonia
- English name: Tour of Estonia
- Discipline: Road race
- Competition: UCI Europe Tour
- Type: Stage-race
- Organiser: Club Tartu Maraton
- Web site: www.tourofestonia.ee

History
- First edition: 2013
- Editions: 13 (as of 2026)
- First winner: Gert Jõeäär (EST)
- Most wins: Grzegorz Stępniak (POL); Karl Patrick Lauk (EST); (2 wins)
- Most recent: Marceli Bogusławski (POL)

History (women)
- First winner: Agnieszka Skalniak-Sójka (POL)
- Most recent: Karolina Kumięga (POL)

The Tour of Estonia is a road bicycle racing stage race held in Estonia. The race is organised as a 2.1 event on the UCI Europe Tour. The race was created by amalgamating two existing one-day races in Estonia that traditionally took place during the same weekend in early summer, the Tallinn–Tartu GP, and the Tartu GP. These two races now make up the first and second stage, respectively.

== Winners ==
Year	Country	Rider	Team
2013	Estonia	Gert Jõeäär	Estonia (national team)
2014	Romania	Eduard-Michael Grosu	Vini Fantini–Nippo
2015	Estonia	Martin Laas	Estonia (national team)
2016	Poland	Grzegorz Stępniak	CCC–Sprandi–Polkowice
2017	Estonia	Karl Patrick Lauk	Estonia (national team)
2018	Poland	Grzegorz Stępniak	Wibatech Merx 7R
2019	Estonia	Mihkel Räim	Israel Cycling Academy
2020	No race due to the COVID-19 pandemic in Estonia		
2021	Estonia	Karl Patrick Lauk	Estonia (national team)
2022	Lithuania	Evaldas Šiškevičius	Lithuania (national team)
2023	Denmark	Rasmus Bøgh Wallin	Restaurant Suri–Carl Ras
2024	Estonia	Siim Kiskonen	Voltas–Tartu 2024 by CCN
2025	Denmark	Marcus Sander Hansen	BHS–PL Beton Bornholm
2026	Poland	Marceli Bogusławski	ATT Investments

== Classifications ==
The jerseys worn by the leaders of the individual classifications are:

- Yellow Jersey – Worn by the leader of the general classification.
- Green Jersey – Worn by the leader of the points classification.
- Red Jersey – Worn by the leader of the climber classification.
- White Jersey – Worn by the best rider under 23 years of age on the overall classification.

== Women's race ==
In 2022, a one-day women's edition, known as the Ladies Tour of Estonia, was established, as a 1.2 category UCI event.

=== Winners ===
Year	Country	Rider	Team
2022	Poland	Agnieszka Skalniak-Sójka	Poland (national team)
2023	Ukraine	Olga Shekel	Ukraine (national team)
2024	Netherlands	Eline van Rooijen	Team Coop–Repsol
2025	Poland	Karolina Kumięga	Poland (national team)
