= Visegrad 4 Bicycle Race =

European one-day road cycling races

Race details
- Date: July
- Region: Europe
- Discipline: Road race
- Competition: UCI Europe Tour
- Type: One-day race
- Web site: visegrad4bicyclerace.com

History
- First edition: 2014
- Editions: 11 (as of 2025)
- Most wins: Alois Kaňkovský (CZE) (6 wins)

The Visegrad 4 Bicycle Race is a set of one day road bicycle races held annually in Poland, Hungary, Slovakia and the Czech Republic. The races are organized as 1.2 events on the UCI Europe Tour.

== Winners ==
=== GP Polski ===
Year	Country	Rider	Team
2014	Slovakia	Erik Baška	Dukla Trenčín–Trek
2015	Poland	Bartosz Warchoł	Cycling Academy
2016	Poland	Łukasz Owsian	CCC–Sprandi–Polkowice
2017	Poland	Kamil Zieliński	Domin Sport
2018	Poland	Maciej Paterski	Wibatech Merx 7R
2019	Czech Republic	Alois Kaňkovský	Elkov–Author
2020	No race		
2021	Israel	Itamar Einhorn	Israel (national team)
2022	Poland	Marceli Bogusławski	HRE Mazowsze Serce Polski
2023	Israel	Itamar Einhorn	Israel (national team)
2024	Slovakia	Lukáš Kubiš	Elkov–Kasper
2025	Poland	Norbert Banaszek	ATT Investments
2026	Poland	Nikiforos Arvanitou	Team United Shipping

=== GP Czech Republic ===
Year	Country	Rider	Team
2014	Czech Republic	Josef Černý	CCC–Polsat–Polkowice
2015	Poland	Paweł Bernas	ActiveJet
2016	Poland	Marek Rutkiewicz	Wibatech–Fuji
2017	Slovenia	Rok Korošec	Amplatz–BMC
2018	Czech Republic	Alois Kaňkovský	Elkov–Author
2019–2020	No race		
2021	Czech Republic	Adam Ťoupalík	Elkov–Kasper
2022	Czech Republic	Adam Ťoupalík	Elkov–Kasper
2023	Czech Republic	Adam Ťoupalík	Elkov–Kasper
2024	Czech Republic	Martin Voltr	Pierre Baguette Cycling
2025	No race		
2026	Czech Republic	Piotr Pękala	ATT Investments

=== GP Slovakia ===
Year	Country	Rider	Team
2014	Poland	Paweł Bernas	BDC Marcpol
2015	Czech Republic	Alois Kaňkovský	Whirlpool–Author
2016	Ukraine	Andriy Kulyk	Kolss BDC Team
2017	Czech Republic	Alois Kaňkovský	Elkov–Author
2018	Poland	Maciej Paterski	Wibatech Merx 7R
2019	Czech Republic	Alois Kaňkovský	Elkov–Author
2020	Poland	Stanisław Aniołkowski	CCC Development Team
2021	Poland	Alan Banaszek	Mazowsze Serce Polski
2022	Italy	Thomas Pesenti	Beltrami TSA–Tre Colli
2023	Poland	Maciej Paterski	Voster ATS Team
2024	Czech Republic	Martin Voltr	Pierre Baguette Cycling
2025	Italy	Cesare Chesini	MBH Bank Ballan CSB
2026	Italy	Alessandro Verre	MBH Bank CSB Telecom Fort

=== Kerékpárverseny ===
Year	Country	Rider	Team
2014	Poland	Paweł Bernas	BDC Marcpol
2015	Czech Republic	Alois Kaňkovský	Whirlpool–Author
2016	Slovakia	Marek Čanecký	Amplatz–BMC
2017	Poland	Kamil Zieliński	Domin Sport
2018	Czech Republic	František Sisr	CCC–Sprandi–Polkowice
2019	Poland	Paweł Franczak	Voster ATS Team
2020	No race		
2021	Czech Republic	Michal Schlegel	Elkov–Kasper
2022	Czech Republic	Adam Ťoupalík	Elkov–Kasper
2023	Czech Republic	Adam Ťoupalík	Elkov–Kasper
2024	Slovenia	Tilen Finkšt	Adria Mobil
2025	Italy	Dario Igor Belletta	Solme–Olmo
2026	Italy	Luca Cretti	MBH Bank CSB Telecom Fort

=== V4 Special Series Debrecen–Ibrány ===
Year	Country	Rider	Team
2018	Hungary	Péter Kusztor	My Bike–Stevens
2019	Hungary	János Pelikán	Pannon Cycling Team

=== V4 Special Series Vásárosnamény–Nyíregyháza ===
Year	Country	Rider	Team
2019	Austria	Daniel Auer	Maloja Pushbikers
