= 2026 Czech Tour =

2026 UCI ProSeries

Race details
- Dates: 13–16 August 2026
- Stages: 4
- Distance: 649.3 km (403.5 mi)
- Winning time: 15h 08' 12"

Results
Jersey awarded to the overall winner	Winner	Andrew August (USA)	(Netcompany INEOS)
	Second	Alessandro Fancellu (ITA)	(MBH Bank CSB Telecom Fort)
	Third	Domenico Pozzovivo (ITA)	(Solution Tech NIPPO Rali)
Jersey awarded to the points classification winner	Points	Andrew August (USA)	(Netcompany INEOS)
Jersey awarded to the mountains classification winner	Mountains	Michal Schuran (CZE)	(Team United Shipping)
Jersey awarded to the young rider classification winner	Young rider	Andrew August (USA)	(Netcompany INEOS)
	Team	(Italy) Bardiani–CSF 7 Saber	

The 2026 Czech Tour was a road cycling stage race that took place between 13 and 16 August 2026. It was the 17th edition of the Czech Tour, which was rated as a 2.Pro event on the 2026 UCI ProSeries calendar.

== Teams ==
Three UCI WorldTeams, ten UCI ProTeams, and five UCI Continental teams made up the eighteen teams that competed in the race.

UCI WorldTeams

- Netcompany INEOS
- NSN Cycling Team
- Soudal–Quick-Step

UCI ProTeams

- Bardiani–CSF 7 Saber
- Caja Rural–Seguros RGA
- Equipo Kern Pharma
- MBH Bank CSB Telecom Fort
- Modern Adventure Pro Cycling
- Solution Tech NIPPO Rali
- Team Flanders–Baloise
- Team Novo Nordisk
- Team Polti VisitMalta
- Team TotalEnergies

UCI Continental Teams

- ATT Investments
- Kasper Crypto4me
- Red Bull–Bora–Hansgrohe Rookies
- Team United Shipping
- TUFO–Pardus Prostějov

== Route ==
Stage characteristics and winners
Stage	Date	Route	Distance	Type	Winner
1	13 August	Prague to Karlovy Vary	163.2 km (101.4 mi)	Hilly stage	Riley Sheehan (USA)
2	14 August	Mladá Boleslav to Ještěd	155 km (96 mi)	Hilly stage	Andrew August (USA)
3	15 August	Pardubice to Dlouhé stráně	170.9 km (106.2 mi)	Hilly stage	Andrew August (USA)
4	16 August	Kroměříž to Pustevny	160.2 km (99.5 mi)	Hilly stage	Alessandro Fancellu (ITA)
Total			649.3 km (403.5 mi)		

== Stages ==
=== Stage 1 ===
13 August 2026 — Prague to Karlovy Vary, 163.2 km (101.4 mi)

Stage 1 Result
Rank	Rider	Team	Time
1	Riley Sheehan (USA)	NSN Cycling Team	3h 45' 15"
2	Ben Turner (GBR)	Netcompany INEOS	+ 0"
3	Romet Pajur (EST)	Red Bull–Bora–Hansgrohe Rookies	+ 0"
4	Scott McGill (USA)	Modern Adventure Pro Cycling	+ 0"
5	Nolan Huysmans (BEL)	Team Flanders–Baloise	+ 0"
6	Dominik Neuman (CZE)	ATT Investments	+ 0"
7	Filippo Turconi (ITA)	Bardiani–CSF 7 Saber	+ 0"
8	Jules Hesters (BEL)	Team Flanders–Baloise	+ 0"
9	Thomas Pesenti (ITA)	Team Polti VisitMalta	+ 0"
10	Sergi Darder (ESP)	Caja Rural–Seguros RGA	+ 0"

General classification after Stage 1
Rank	Rider	Team	Time
1	Riley Sheehan (USA)	NSN Cycling Team	3h 45' 05"
2	Ben Turner (GBR)	Netcompany INEOS	+ 4"
3	Romet Pajur (EST)	Red Bull–Bora–Hansgrohe Rookies	+ 6"
4	Scott McGill (USA)	Modern Adventure Pro Cycling	+ 10"
5	Nolan Huysmans (BEL)	Team Flanders–Baloise	+ 10"
6	Dominik Neuman (CZE)	ATT Investments	+ 10"
7	Filippo Turconi (ITA)	Bardiani–CSF 7 Saber	+ 10"
8	Jules Hesters (BEL)	Team Flanders–Baloise	+ 10"
9	Thomas Pesenti (ITA)	Team Polti VisitMalta	+ 10"
10	Sergi Darder (ESP)	Caja Rural–Seguros RGA	+ 10"

=== Stage 2 ===
14 August 2026 — Mladá Boleslav to Ještěd, 155 km (96 mi)

Stage 2 Result
Rank	Rider	Team	Time
1	Andrew August (USA)	Netcompany INEOS	3h 37' 28"
2	Alessandro Fancellu (ITA)	MBH Bank CSB Telecom Fort	+ 2"
3	Domenico Pozzovivo (ITA)	Solution Tech NIPPO Rali	+ 5"
4	Filippo Turconi (ITA)	Bardiani–CSF 7 Saber	+ 7"
5	Mauri Vansevenant (BEL)	Soudal–Quick-Step	+ 9"
6	Luca Covili (ITA)	Bardiani–CSF 7 Saber	+ 13"
7	Mats Wenzel (LUX)	Equipo Kern Pharma	+ 13"
8	Max Bock (GER)	Red Bull–Bora–Hansgrohe Rookies	+ 15"
9	Embret Svestad-Bårdseng (NOR)	Netcompany INEOS	+ 19"
10	Stefan De Bod (RSA)	Modern Adventure Pro Cycling	+ 19"

General classification after Stage 2
Rank	Rider	Team	Time
1	Andrew August (USA)	Netcompany INEOS	7h 22' 33"
2	Alessandro Fancellu (ITA)	MBH Bank CSB Telecom Fort	+ 6"
3	Domenico Pozzovivo (ITA)	Solution Tech NIPPO Rali	+ 11"
4	Filippo Turconi (ITA)	Bardiani–CSF 7 Saber	+ 17"
5	Mauri Vansevenant (BEL)	Soudal–Quick-Step	+ 19"
6	Luca Covili (ITA)	Bardiani–CSF 7 Saber	+ 23"
7	Mats Wenzel (LUX)	Equipo Kern Pharma	+ 23"
8	Max Bock (GER)	Red Bull–Bora–Hansgrohe Rookies	+ 25"
9	Nicolas Breuillard (FRA)	Team TotalEnergies	+ 29"
10	Václav Ježek (CZE)	Kasper Crypto4me	+ 29"

=== Stage 3 ===
15 August 2026 — Pardubice to Dlouhé stráně, 170.9 km (106.2 mi)

Stage 3 Result
Rank	Rider	Team	Time
1	Andrew August (USA)	Netcompany INEOS	4h 03' 39"
2	Alessandro Fancellu (ITA)	MBH Bank CSB Telecom Fort	+ 1"
3	Domenico Pozzovivo (ITA)	Solution Tech NIPPO Rali	+ 6"
4	Václav Ježek (CZE)	Kasper Crypto4me	+ 13"
5	Nicolas Breuillard (FRA)	Team TotalEnergies	+ 13"
6	Embret Svestad-Bårdseng (NOR)	Netcompany INEOS	+ 13"
7	Piotr Pękala (POL)	ATT Investments	+ 13"
8	Alex Tolio (ITA)	Bardiani–CSF 7 Saber	+ 13"
9	Filippo Turconi (ITA)	Bardiani–CSF 7 Saber	+ 13"
10	Max Bock (GER)	Red Bull–Bora–Hansgrohe Rookies	+ 15"

General classification after Stage 3
Rank	Rider	Team	Time
1	Andrew August (USA)	Netcompany INEOS	11h 26' 02"
2	Alessandro Fancellu (ITA)	MBH Bank CSB Telecom Fort	+ 11"
3	Domenico Pozzovivo (ITA)	Solution Tech NIPPO Rali	+ 23"
4	Filippo Turconi (ITA)	Bardiani–CSF 7 Saber	+ 40"
5	Max Bock (GER)	Red Bull–Bora–Hansgrohe Rookies	+ 48"
6	Nicolas Breuillard (FRA)	Team TotalEnergies	+ 52"
7	Václav Ježek (CZE)	Kasper Crypto4me	+ 52"
8	Embret Svestad-Bårdseng (NOR)	Netcompany INEOS	+ 52"
9	Jorge Gutiérrez (ESP)	Equipo Kern Pharma	+ 52"
10	Luca Covili (ITA)	Bardiani–CSF 7 Saber	+ 52"

=== Stage 4 ===
16 August 2026 — Kroměříž to Pustevny, 160.2 km (99.5 mi)

Stage 4 Result
Rank	Rider	Team	Time
1	Alessandro Fancellu (ITA)	MBH Bank CSB Telecom Fort	3h 42' 16"
2	Andrew August (USA)	Netcompany INEOS	+ 0"
3	Nicolas Breuillard (FRA)	Team TotalEnergies	+ 0"
4	Václav Ježek (CZE)	Kasper Crypto4me	+ 5"
5	Filippo Turconi (ITA)	Bardiani–CSF 7 Saber	+ 5"
6	Piotr Pękala (POL)	ATT Investments	+ 5"
7	Max Bock (GER)	Red Bull–Bora–Hansgrohe Rookies	+ 5"
8	Alex Tolio (ITA)	Bardiani–CSF 7 Saber	+ 5"
9	Embret Svestad-Bårdseng (NOR)	Netcompany INEOS	+ 10"
10	Kamiel Bonneu (BEL)	Solution Tech NIPPO Rali	+ 10"

General classification after Stage 4
Rank	Rider	Team	Time
1	Andrew August (USA)	Netcompany INEOS	15h 08' 21"
2	Alessandro Fancellu (ITA)	MBH Bank CSB Telecom Fort	+ 7"
3	Domenico Pozzovivo (ITA)	Solution Tech NIPPO Rali	+ 40"
4	Filippo Turconi (ITA)	Bardiani–CSF 7 Saber	+ 51"
5	Nicolas Breuillard (FRA)	Team TotalEnergies	+ 54"
6	Max Bock (GER)	Red Bull–Bora–Hansgrohe Rookies	+ 59"
7	Václav Ježek (CZE)	Kasper Crypto4me	+ 1' 03"
8	Embret Svestad-Bårdseng (NOR)	Netcompany INEOS	+ 1' 08"
9	Jan Hirt (CZE)	NSN Cycling Team	+ 1' 24"
10	Alex Tolio (ITA)	Bardiani–CSF 7 Saber	+ 1' 44"

== Classification leadership table ==
Classification leadership by stage
Stage	Winner	General classification	Points classification	Mountains classification	Young rider classification	Team classification
1	Riley Sheehan	Riley Sheehan	Riley Sheehan	Pepijn Reinderink	Romet Pajur	Team Flanders–Baloise
2	Andrew August	Andrew August	Andrew August	Michal Schuran	Andrew August	Bardiani–CSF 7 Saber
3	Andrew August	Andrew August	Andrew August	Michal Schuran	Andrew August	Bardiani–CSF 7 Saber
4	Alessandro Fancellu	Andrew August	Andrew August	Michal Schuran	Andrew August	Bardiani–CSF 7 Saber
Final		Andrew August	Andrew August	Michal Schuran	Andrew August	Bardiani–CSF 7 Saber

== Classification standings ==
Legend
Denotes the winner of the general classification	Denotes the winner of the points classification
Denotes the winner of the mountains classification	Denotes the winner of the young rider classification

=== General classification ===
Final general classification (1–10)
Rank	Rider	Team	Time
1	Andrew August (USA)	Netcompany INEOS	15h 08' 12"
2	Alessandro Fancellu (ITA)	MBH Bank CSB Telecom Fort	+ 7"
3	Domenico Pozzovivo (ITA)	Solution Tech NIPPO Rali	+ 40"
4	Filippo Turconi (ITA)	Bardiani–CSF 7 Saber	+ 51"
5	Nicolas Breuillard (FRA)	Team TotalEnergies	+ 54"
6	Max Bock (GER)	Red Bull–Bora–Hansgrohe Rookies	+ 59"
7	Václav Ježek (CZE)	Kasper Crypto4me	+ 1' 03"
8	Embret Svestad-Bårdseng (NOR)	Netcompany INEOS	+ 1' 08"
9	Jan Hirt (CZE)	NSN Cycling Team	+ 1' 24"
10	Alex Tolio (ITA)	Bardiani–CSF 7 Saber	+ 1' 44"

=== Points classification ===
Final points classification (1–10)
Rank	Rider	Team	Points
1	Andrew August (USA)	Netcompany INEOS	70
2	Alessandro Fancellu (ITA)	MBH Bank CSB Telecom Fort	65
3	Filippo Turconi (ITA)	Bardiani–CSF 7 Saber	42
4	Domenico Pozzovivo (ITA)	Solution Tech NIPPO Rali	37
5	Nicolas Breuillard (FRA)	Team TotalEnergies	33
6	Václav Ježek (CZE)	Kasper Crypto4me	31
7	Romet Pajur (EST)	Red Bull–Bora–Hansgrohe Rookies	26
8	Riley Sheehan (USA)	NSN Cycling Team	25
9	Embret Svestad-Bårdseng (NOR)	Netcompany INEOS	24
10	Max Bock (GER)	Red Bull–Bora–Hansgrohe Rookies	23

=== Mountains classification ===
Final mountains classification (1–10)
Rank	Rider	Team	Points
1	Michal Schuran (CZE)	Team United Shipping	28
2	Andrew August (USA)	Netcompany INEOS	22
3	Alessandro Fancellu (ITA)	MBH Bank CSB Telecom Fort	20
4	Pepijn Reinderink (NED)	Soudal–Quick-Step	16
5	Martin Voltr (CZE)	ATT Investments	12
6	Domenico Pozzovivo (ITA)	Solution Tech NIPPO Rali	8
7	Nolan Huysmans (BEL)	Team Flanders–Baloise	6
8	Nicolas Breuillard (FRA)	Team TotalEnergies	4
9	Václav Ježek (CZE)	Kasper Crypto4me	4
10	Mattia Bais (ITA)	Team Polti VisitMalta	4

=== Young rider classification ===
Final young rider classification (1–10)
Rank	Rider	Team	Time
1	Andrew August (USA)	Netcompany INEOS	15h 08' 12"
2	Filippo Turconi (ITA)	Bardiani–CSF 7 Saber	+ 51"
3	Max Bock (GER)	Red Bull–Bora–Hansgrohe Rookies	+ 59"
4	Václav Ježek (CZE)	Kasper Crypto4me	+ 1' 03"
5	Alberto Monti (CZE)	ATT Investments	+ 2' 48"
6	Anatol Friedl (AUT)	Red Bull–Bora–Hansgrohe Rookies	+ 3' 37"
7	Adam Pešek (CZE)	Kasper Crypto4me	+ 4' 39"
8	Edward Cruz (COL)	Bardiani–CSF 7 Saber	+ 4' 48"
9	Filip Gruszczyński (POL)	MBH Bank CSB Telecom Fort	+ 5' 10"
10	Gauthier Servranckx (BEL)	Soudal–Quick-Step	+ 5' 21"

=== Team classification ===
Final team classification (1–10)
Rank	Team	Time
1	(Italy) Bardiani–CSF 7 Saber	45h 28' 49"
2	(United Kingdom) Netcompany INEOS	+ 1' 29"
3	(Hungary) MBH Bank CSB Telecom Fort	+ 4' 36"
4	(Spain) Equipo Kern Pharma	+ 4' 47"
5	(France) Team TotalEnergies	+ 4' 50"
6	(Czech Republic) ATT Investments	+ 4' 59"
7	(Belgium) Soudal–Quick-Step	+ 5' 38"
8	(Belgium) Team Flanders–Baloise	+ 7' 38"
9	(Italy) Team Polti VisitMalta	+ 7' 51"
10	(Spain) Caja Rural–Seguros RGA	+ 8' 48"
