= 2024 Team Bahrain Victorious season =

Team Bahrain Victorious
- 2024 season
- UCI code: TBM
- Status: UCI WorldTeam
- Manager: Milan Eržen (SVN)
- Based: Bahrain
- Bicycles: Merida
- Groupset: Shimano

Season victories
- Stage race overall: 1
- Stage race stages: 10
- National Championships: 2
- Most wins: Matevž Govekar (SLO) (3)

The 2024 season for the Team Bahrain Victorious team is the team's 8th season in existence, all of which have been as a UCI WorldTeam.

== Team roster ==
As of 3 March 2024.

Rider	Date of birth
Yukiya Arashiro (JPN)	22 September 1984 (aged 39)
Nikias Arndt (GER)	18 November 1991 (aged 32)
Phil Bauhaus (GER)	8 July 1994 (aged 29)
Pello Bilbao (ESP)	25 February 1990 (aged 33)
Alberto Bruttomesso (ITA)	30 October 2003 (aged 20)
Santiago Buitrago (COL)	26 September 1999 (aged 24)
Nicolò Buratti (ITA)	7 July 2001 (aged 22)
Damiano Caruso (ITA)	12 October 1987 (aged 36)
Matevž Govekar (SLO)	17 April 2000 (aged 23)
Kamil Gradek (POL)	17 September 1990 (aged 33)
Jack Haig (AUS)	6 September 1993 (aged 30)
Rainer Kepplinger (AUT)	19 August 1997 (aged 26)
Ahmed Madan (BHR)	25 August 2000 (aged 23)
Fran Miholjević (CRO)	2 August 2002 (aged 21)

Rider	Date of birth
Matej Mohorič (SLO)	19 October 1994 (aged 29)
Andrea Pasqualon (ITA)	2 January 1988 (aged 35)
Finlay Pickering (GBR)	27 January 2003 (aged 20)
Wout Poels (NED)	1 October 1987 (aged 36)
Johan Price-Pejtersen (DEN)	26 May 1999 (aged 24)
Dušan Rajović (SER)	19 November 1997 (aged 26)
Cameron Scott (AUS)	4 January 1998 (aged 25)
Jasha Sütterlin (GER)	4 November 1992 (aged 31)
Antonio Tiberi (ITA)	24 June 2001 (aged 22)
Torstein Træen (NOR)	16 July 1995 (aged 28)
Sergio Tu (TPE)	24 February 1997 (aged 26)
Łukasz Wiśniowski (POL)	7 December 1991 (aged 32)
Fred Wright (GBR)	13 June 1999 (aged 24)
Edoardo Zambanini (ITA)	21 April 2001 (aged 22)

== Season victories ==
Date	Race	Competition	Rider	Country	Location	Ref.
1 February	Volta a la Comunitat Valenciana, stage 2	UCI ProSeries	Matej Mohorič (SVN)	Spain	Simat de la Valldigna	
9 February	Tour of Antalya, stage 2	UCI Europe Tour	Matevž Govekar (SVN)	Turkey	Antalya	
6 March	Tirreno–Adriatico, stage 3	UCI World Tour	Phil Bauhaus (GER)	Italy	Gualdo Tadino	
6 March	Paris–Nice, stage 4	UCI World Tour	Santiago Buitrago (COL)	France	Mont Brouilly	
12 May	Tour de Hongrie, stage 5	UCI ProSeries	Wout Poels (NED)	Hungary	Pécs	
12 June	Tour de Suisse, stage 4	UCI World Tour	Torstein Træen (NOR)	Switzerland	Gotthard Pass	
13 June	Tour of Slovenia, stage 2	UCI ProSeries	Phil Bauhaus (GER)	Slovenia	Rogaška Slatina	
15 June	Tour of Slovenia, stage 4	UCI ProSeries	Pello Bilbao (ESP)	Slovenia	Krvavec	
8 September	Tour of Britain, stage 6	UCI ProSeries	Matevž Govekar (SLO)	United Kingdom	Felixtowe	
22 September	Tour de Luxembourg, overall	UCI ProSeries	Antonio Tiberi (ITA)	Luxembourg		
20 October	Tour of Guangxi, stage 6	UCI World Tour	Matevž Govekar (SLO)	China	Nanning	

== National, Continental, and World Champions ==
Date	Discipline	Jersey	Rider	Country	Location	Ref.
20 June	Slovenian National Time Trial Championships		Matej Mohorič (SLO)	Slovenia	Trebnje	
21 June	Serbian National Time Trial Championships		Dušan Rajović (SER)	Serbia	Erdevik	
