= 2025 UCI Road World Championships – Men's under-23 road race =

Cycling event

Men's under-23 road race
2025 UCI Road World Championships

Race details
- Dates: 26 September 2025
- Distance: 164.6 km (102.3 mi)
- Winning time: 3h 57' 24"

Medalists
	Gold	(Italy) Lorenzo Finn (ITA)
	Silver	(Switzerland) Jan Huber (SUI)
	Bronze	(Austria) Marco Schrettl (AUT)

The Men's under-23 road race of the 2025 UCI Road World Championships was a cycling event that took place on 26 September 2025 in Kigali, Rwanda. It was the th edition of the championship, for which Niklas Behrens of Germany was the defending champion, having won in 2024.

== Final classification ==
Pos.	Position in the time trial
Time	Time taken to complete the time trial
Diff	Deficit to the winner of the time trial
DNS	Denotes a rider who did not start
DNF	Denotes a rider who did not finish
DSQ	Denotes a rider who was disqualified from the race
OTL	Denotes a rider who finished outside the time limit

Rank	Rider	Country	Time
1st place, gold medalist(s)	Lorenzo Finn	Italy	3h 57' 27"
2nd place, silver medalist(s)	Jan Huber	Switzerland	+ 31"
3rd place, bronze medalist(s)	Marco Schrettl	Austria	+ 1' 13"
4	Héctor Álvarez	Spain	+ 1' 38"
5	Mateusz Gajdulewicz	Poland	+ 1' 42"
6	Pau Martí	Spain	+ 2' 22"
7	Victor Loulergue	France	s.t.
8	Robin Donzé	Switzerland	+ 2' 24"
9	Adrià Pericas	Spain	s.t.
10	Mateo Ramírez	Ecuador	s.t.
11	Max Bock	Germany	+ 2' 34"
12	Lucas Lopes	Portugal	+ 2' 35"
13	Maxime Decomble	France	+ 3' 04"
14	Jakob Omrzel	Slovenia	+ 4' 32"
15	Halvor Dolven	Norway	+ 5' 10"
16	Louis Leidert	Germany	+ 6' 37"
17	Matthew Greenwood	Australia	+ 7' 11"
18	Jakob Söderqvist	Sweden	+ 7' 36"
19	Matthias Schwarzbacher	Slovakia	+ 8' 20"
20	Antoine L'Hote	France	+ 8' 32"
21	Aaron Dockx	Belgium	+ 8' 41"
22	Cole Kessler	United States	+ 8' 45"
23	William Colorado	Colombia	+ 8' 55"
24	Ciro Pérez	Uruguay	+ 9' 07"
25	Jasper Schoofs	Belgium	+ 9' 12"
26	Anže Ravbar	Slovenia	+ 9' 26"
27	Jaider Muñoz	Colombia	+ 9' 33"
28	Simone Gualdi	Italy	+ 9' 40"
29	Pietro Mattio	Italy	s.t.
30	Alessandro Borgo	Italy	s.t.
31	Daniel Lima	Portugal	+ 10' 01"
32	Henrique Ribeiro	Brazil	+ 10' 28"
33	Kamiel Eeman	Belgium	+ 11' 45"
34	Jarno Widar	Belgium	s.t.
35	Gabriel Baptista	Portugal	+ 12' 11"
36	Michał Pomorski	Poland	s.t.
37	Jonas Walton	Canada	s.t.
38	Blaine Kieck	South Africa	+ 12' 17"
39	Tekle Alemayo	Ethiopia	s.t.
40	Nils Aebersold	Switzerland	+ 12' 21"
41	Hebron Berhane	Eritrea	+ 12' 24"
42	Heorhii Chyzhykov	Ukraine	+ 12' 46"
43	Jaka Marolt	Slovenia	+ 15' 31"
44	Erazem Valjavec	Slovenia	s.t.
45	Juan Felipe Rodríguez	Colombia	s.t.
46	Adrià Regada	Andorra	+ 15' 59"
47	Jerome Gauthier	Canada	s.t.
48	Rudolf Remkhi	Kazakhstan	+ 16' 02"
49	Awet Aman	Eritrea	s.t.
50	Samuel Niyonkuru	Rwanda	+ 16' 04"
51	Alberto Monti	Czech Republic	+ 16' 17"
52	Yafiet Mulugeta	Eritrea	+ 16' 39"
53	Tomáš Přidal	Czech Republic	+ 16' 59"
54	Unai Ramos	Spain	+ 17' 36"
55	Samuel Fernández	Spain	s.t.
56	Iker Gómez	Spain	s.t.

Rank	Rider	Country	Time
	Paul Fietzke	Germany	DNF
	Tim Rex	Belgium	DNF
	Daniel Moreira	Portugal	DNF
	Vladislav Bashlykov	Kazakhstan	DNF
	Bálint Feldhoffer	Hungary	DNF
	Joshua Dike	South Africa	DNF
	Pedri Crause	South Africa	DNF
	Hamish McKenzie	Australia	DNF
	Zac Marriage	Australia	DNF
	Evan Boyle	United States	DNF
	Adam Gross	Slovakia	DNF
	César Macías	Mexico	DNF
	Milkias Maekele	Eritrea	DNF
	Dawid Lewandowski	Poland	DNF
	Kam Chin Pok	Macau	DNF
	Jo Hashikawa	Japan	DNF
	Warren Moolman	South Africa	DNF
	Emry Faingezicht	Israel	DNF
	Štěpán Zahálka	Czech Republic	DNF
	Storm Ingebrigtsen	Norway	DNF
	Luke Valenti	Canada	DNF
	Yoel Habteab	Eritrea	DNF
	Nikita Tsvetkov	Uzbekistan	DNF
	Etienne Tuyizere	Rwanda	DNF
	Mauro Brenner	Germany	DNF
	Derrick Chavarria	Belize	DNF
	Mustafa Tarakci	Turkey	DNF
	Geremedhin Hailemaryam	Ethiopia	DNF
	José Maestre Leal	Venezuela	DNF
	Mohamed Aziz Dellai	Tunisia	DNF
	Shadrack Ufitimana	Rwanda	DNF
	Jadian Neaves	Trinidad and Tobago	DNF
	Nejc Komac	Slovenia	DNF
	Ramazan Yilmaz	Turkey	DNF
	Li You	China	DNF
	Temuulen Khadbaatar	Mongolia	DNF
	Driss El Alouani	Morocco	DNF
	Neriah Meunier Sow	Senegal	DNF
	Lawrence Lorot	Uganda	DNF
	Martin Bárta	Czech Republic	DNF
	Samuel Couture	Canada	DNF
	Andrei Belyanin	Individual Neutral Athletes	DNF
	William Piat	Mauritius	DNF
	Dias Rysbay	Kazakhstan	DNF
	Redmond Connolly	New Zealand	DNF
	Aime Ruhumuriza	Rwanda	DNF
	Shafik Mugalu	Uganda	DNF
	Danylo Kozoriz	Ukraine	DNF
	Ivan Malakwen	Kenya	DNF
	Amanuel Tesfay	Ethiopia	DNF
	Kabelo Makatile	Lesotho	DNF
	Oussama Mimouni	Algeria	DNF
	Samuel Novák	Slovakia	DNF
	Ferhat Emisci	Turkey	DNF
	Tiemoko Diallo	Mali	DNF
	Tiemoko Diamoutene	Mali	DNF
	Judah Thompson	Thailand	DNF
	Wilson Sanon	Haiti	DNF
	Mohammed Alaleeli	United Arab Emirates	DNF
	Jahdel Gabriel	Seychelles	DNF
	Oumarou Moussa	Cameroon	DNF
	Edward Ngunu	Kenya	DNF
