= Filippo Turconi =

Italian cyclist

- Turconi in 2026

Personal information
- Born: 20 October 2005 (age 20) Varese, Italy

Cycling career
- Sport: Cycling
- Current team: Bardiani–CSF 7 Saber
- Discipline: Road
- Role: Rider

Amateur team
- 2018–2023: U.C Bustese Olonia ASD

Professional team
- 2024–: VF Group–Bardiani–CSF–Faizanè

Filippo Turconi (born 20 October 2005) is an Italian racing cyclist, who currently rides for UCI ProTeam Bardiani–CSF 7 Saber.

He is the nephew of the former professional cyclist Stefano Zanini. His younger brother Matteo is also a cyclist.

Turning professional in 2024 with VF Group–Bardiani–CSF–Faizanè, Turconi took his first elite win at the 2025 Trofeo Piva.

== Major results ==
2022
1st Cirié-Pian della Mussa
2023
1st Piccola Tre Valli Varesine
1st Trofeo Cassa Rurale e Artigiana di Cantù
1st Trofeo Città di San Damiano d'Asti
1st Trofeo Stefano Zanini
1st Stage 1 Giro della Valdera
2nd Giro di Primavera
2nd Gran Premio dell'Arno
2024
3rd Gran Premio Industrie del Marmo
6th Eschborn–Frankfurt Under-23
2025
1st Trofeo Piva
1st Giro del Medio Brenta
2nd Giro della Provincia di Biella
3rd Overall Orlen Nations Grand Prix
4th Flèche Ardennaise
4th Trofeo Città di San Vendemiano
4th G.P. Palio del Recioto
5th Overall Giro Next Gen
8th Gran Premio della Liberazione
2026
4th Overall Czech Tour
