= 2025 UCI Road World Championships – Men's under-23 time trial =

Cycling event

Men's under-23 time trial
2025 UCI Road World Championships

Race details
- Dates: 22 September 2025
- Distance: 31.2 km (19.4 mi)
- Winning time: 38:24.43

Medalists
	Gold	(Sweden) Jakob Söderqvist (SWE)
	Silver	(New Zealand) Nate Pringle (NZL)
	Bronze	(France) Maxime Decomble (FRA)

The Men's under-23 time trial of the 2025 UCI Road World Championships was a cycling event that took place on 22 September 2025 in Kigali, Rwanda. It was the 29th edition of the championship, for which Iván Romeo of Spain was the defending champion, having won in 2024.

== Final classification ==
Pos.	Position in the time trial
Time	Time taken to complete the time trial
Diff	Deficit to the winner of the time trial
DNS	Denotes a rider who did not start
DNF	Denotes a rider who did not finish
DSQ	Denotes a rider who was disqualified from the race
OTL	Denotes a rider who finished outside the time limit

Rank	Rider	Country	Time	Diff.
1st place, gold medalist(s)	Jakob Söderqvist	Sweden	38:24.43	
2nd place, silver medalist(s)	Nate Pringle	New Zealand	39:28.39	+ 1:03.96
3rd place, bronze medalist(s)	Maxime Decomble	France	39:28.56	+ 1:04.13
4	Lorenzo Mark Finn	Italy	39:33.06	+ 1:08.63
5	Callum Thornley	Great Britain	39:36.34	+ 1:11.91
6	Jonas Walton	Canada	39:51.34	+ 1:26.91
7	Mateusz Gajdulewicz	Poland	39:52.81	+ 1:28.38
8	Jonathan Vervenne	Belgium	39:57.53	+ 1:33.10
9	Héctor Álvarez	Spain	40:04.62	+ 1:40.19
10	Hamish McKenzie	Australia	40:12.79	+ 1:48.36
11	Cole Kessler	United States	40:31.81	+ 2:07.38
12	Adrià Pericas	Spain	40:34.87	+ 2:10.44
13	Alessandro Borgo	Italy	40:38.24	+ 2:13.81
14	Matthias Schwarzbacher	Slovakia	40:41.86	+ 2:17.43
15	Louis Leidert	Germany	41:03.47	+ 2:39.04
16	Paul Fietzke	Germany	41:22.41	+ 2:57.98
17	Jan Huber	Switzerland	41:32.87	+ 3:08.44
18	Rudolf Remkhi	Kazakhstan	41:46.56	+ 3:22.13
19	Pedri Crause	South Africa	41:55.58	+ +3:31.15
20	Jaka Marolt	Slovenia	42:13.10	+ 3:48.67
21	Zac Marriage	Australia	42:13.37	+ 3:48.94
22	Alberto Carlo Monti	Czech Republic	42:25.72	+ 4:01.29
23	Joshua Dike	South Africa	42:45.94	+ 4:21.51
24	Li You	China	42:56.58	+ 4:32.15
25	Mohammad Almutaiwei	United Arab Emirates	43:07.87	+ 4:43.44
26	Semen Simon	Ukraine	43:07.97	+ 4:43.54
27	Andrei Belyanin	Individual Neutral Athletes	43:14.71	+ 4:50.28
28	Samuel Niyonkuru	Rwanda	43:15.35	+ 4:50.92
29	Mansur Beisembay	Kazakhstan	43:20.06	+ 4:55.63
30	Etienne Tuyizere	Rwanda	43:36.51	+ 5:12.08
31	Mateo Kalejman Quiroga	Argentina	43:40.51	+ 5:16.08
32	Driss El Alouani	Morocco	43:47.37	+ 5:22.94
33	Oussama Mimouni	Algeria	43:57.23	+ 5:32.80
34	Danylo Kozoriz	Ukraine	44:13.85	+ 5:49.42
35	Adam Gross	Slovakia	44:13.97	+ 5:49.54
36	Mohamed Aziz Dellai	Tunisia	44:35.00	+ 6:10.57
37	Nejc Komac	Slovenia	44:41.87	+ 6:17.44
38	Tekle Alemayo	Ethiopia	44:54.98	+ 6:30.55
39	Lawrence Lorot	Uganda	44:56.49	+ 6:32.06
40	Shafik Mugalu	Uganda	45:06.45	+ 6:42.02
41	Kam Chin Pok	Macau	45:17.85	+ 6:53.42
42	Ferhat Emisci	Turkey	45:18.68	+ 6:54.25
43	Jadian Neaves	Trinidad and Tobago	45:38.69	+ 7:14.26
44	Geremedhin Hailemaryam	Ethiopia	45:54.19	+ 7:29.76
45	Ramazan Yilmaz	Turkey	45:57.12	+ 7:32.69
46	William Piat	Mauritius	47:10.53	+ 8:46.10
47	Ivan Malakwen	Kenya	49:13.10	+ 10:48.67
48	Jahdel Gabriel	Seychelles	49:52.83	+ 11:28.40
49	Tural Israfilov	Uzbekistan	50:04.11	+ 11:39.68
50	Tiemoko Diamoutene	Mali	50:38.11	+ 12:13.68
51	Gomolemo Kelaotswe	Botswana	50:38.54	+ 12:14.11
52	Tiemoko Diallo	Mali	50:39.73	+ 12:15.30
53	Glorad Saizonou	Benin	51:02.34	+ 12:37.91
54	Jeroff Ted Yao Tossavi	Benin	52:08.37	+ 13:43.94
55	Aditya Prasetyo	Qatar	52:51.98	+ 14:27.55
56	Ahmed Said	Tanzania	53:31.92	+ 15:07.49
57	Said Malale	Tanzania	53:38.49	+ 15:14.06
58	Oumarou Moussa	Cameroon	54:46.14	+ 16:21.71
59	Emmanuel Sesi	Ghana	55:24.24	+ 16:59.81
60	Edward Ngunu	Kenya	59:25.54	+ 21:01.11
	Jarno Widar	Belgium		DNS
