= Callum Thornley =

British cyclist

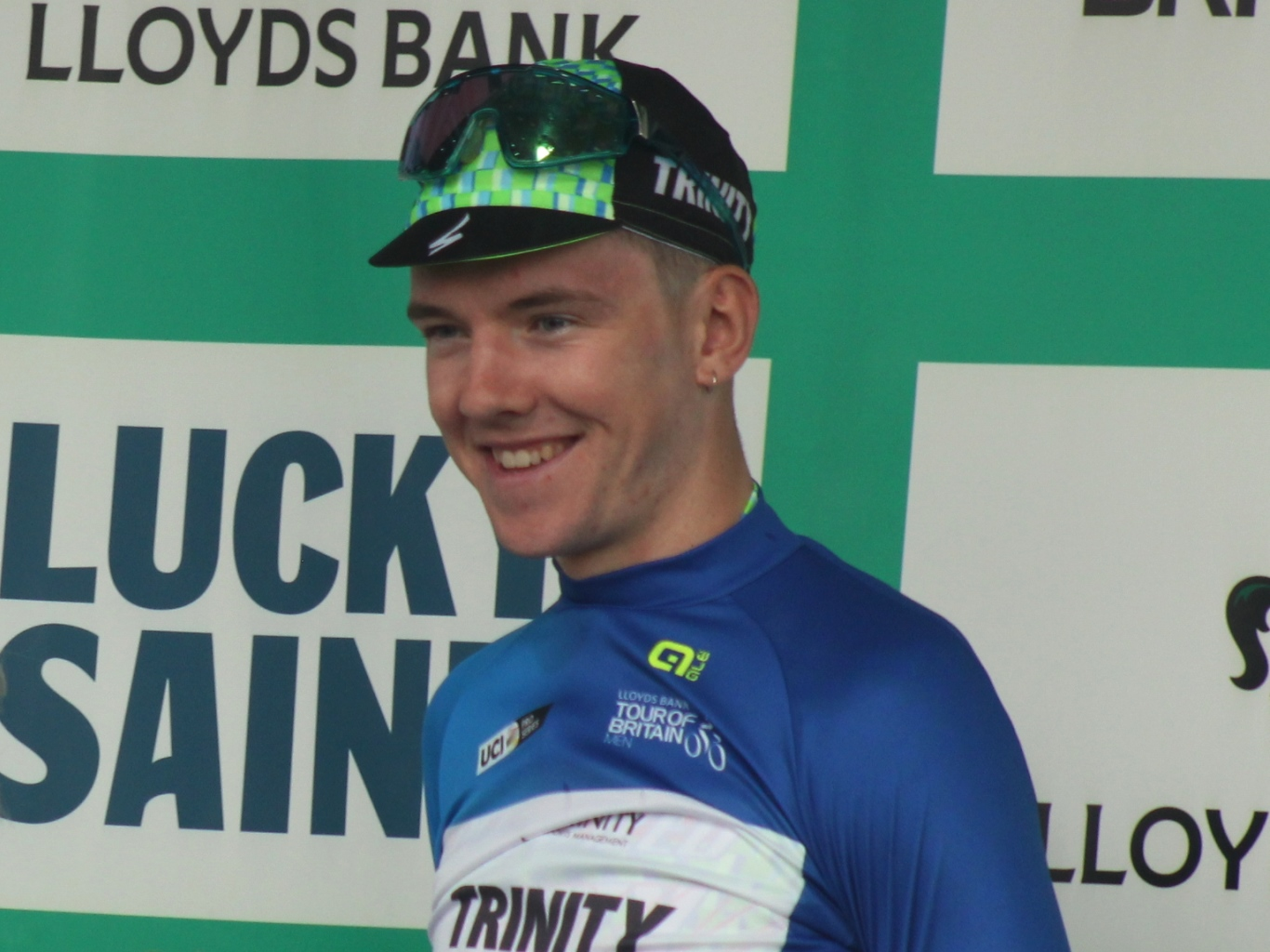
- Thornley at the 2024 Tour of Britain

Personal information
- Born: 5 August 2003 (age 23) Edinburgh, Scotland
- Height: 1.9 m (6 ft 3 in)
- Weight: 76 kg (168 lb)

Cycling career
- Sport: Cycling
- Current team: Red Bull–Bora–Hansgrohe Rookies
- Discipline: Road
- Role: Rider

Amateur team
- 2022: Wheelbase CabTech Castelli

Professional teams
- 2023–2024: Trinity Racing
- 2025: Red Bull–Bora–Hansgrohe Rookies
- 2026-: Red Bull–Bora–Hansgrohe

Callum Thornley (born 5 August 2003) is a Scottish cyclist, who currently rides for UCI WorldTour team Red Bull–Bora–Hansgrohe.

== Early life ==
Thornley is from Peebles in the Scottish Borders. He started mountain-biking at the age of eight and competed at Glentress as a youngster in races organised by Peebles Cycling Club. He raced on the road for the first time as a 16 year-old, but has been interested in road cycling since a family holiday to France as a child enabled him to watch the Tour de France live in the mountains. He's often referred to in close circles as ‘Big Cal’.

== Career ==
He was a stage winner and second overall at the Youth Tour of Errigal in Ireland in 2019. That year, he also competed in the Scottish National Madison Championships, and won the silver medal in the boys' Madison alongside Alexander Gibb.

Thornley finished second in the under-23 time-trial at the British National Time Trial Championships in Dumfries in June 2022. That year, he was riding for Wheelbase CabTech Castelli, before signing for Trinity Racing for 2023.

In 2023, he was selected by the British team to compete in the under-23 time trial at the 2023 UCI Road World Championships in Glasgow. He finished in fourteenth place.

In April 2024, Thornley finished tenth at the Paris–Roubaix Espoirs. He raced in the Giro d'Italia Next Gen, finishing fifth in the stage one time-trial and second on stage seven. He finished ninth in the Points Classification and 11th in the Mountains Classification, and 56th overall. In August, he rode in the Ronde van de Achterhoek, finishing ninth. He was selected to ride the Tour of Britain in September, the first stage of which took place on home roads in the Scottish Borders. Thornley comfortably won the Mountains Classification after strong rides on stages one and two.

On 17 September 2024 it was announced that Thornley would represent Great Britain in the under-23 men's road race at the 2024 UCI Road World Championships in Zurich.

In June 2025, he won the men's U23 race at the British National Time Trial Championships.

Having joined the UCI WorldTour team of Red Bull–Bora–Hansgrohe in 2026, Thornley made his grand tour debut at the 2026 Vuelta a España and had a fourth place finish in the opening time trial. In September and October, he had top-ten finished in the time-trials at both the 2026 UCI Road World Championships in Montreal, and the 2026 European Road Championships in Ljubljana, Slovenia.

== Major results ==
2022
2nd Time trial, National Under-23 Road Championships
2024
1st Mountains classification, Tour of Britain
9th Ronde van de Achterhoek
10th Paris–Roubaix Espoirs
2025 (1 pro win)
National Under-23 Road Championships

1st Time trial
2nd Road race

1st Piccolo Giro di Lombardia
Sibiu Cycling Tour

1st Points classification
1st Stage 4 (ITT)

3rd Overall Istrian Spring Tour
4th Poreč Trophy
5th Time trial, UCI Road World Under-23 Championships
10th Overall Giro Next Gen
2026
9th Time trial, UEC European Road Championships
10th Time trial, UCI Road World Championships
Vuelta a España

Held after Stage 1
