= Mateusz Gajdulewicz =

Polish cyclist

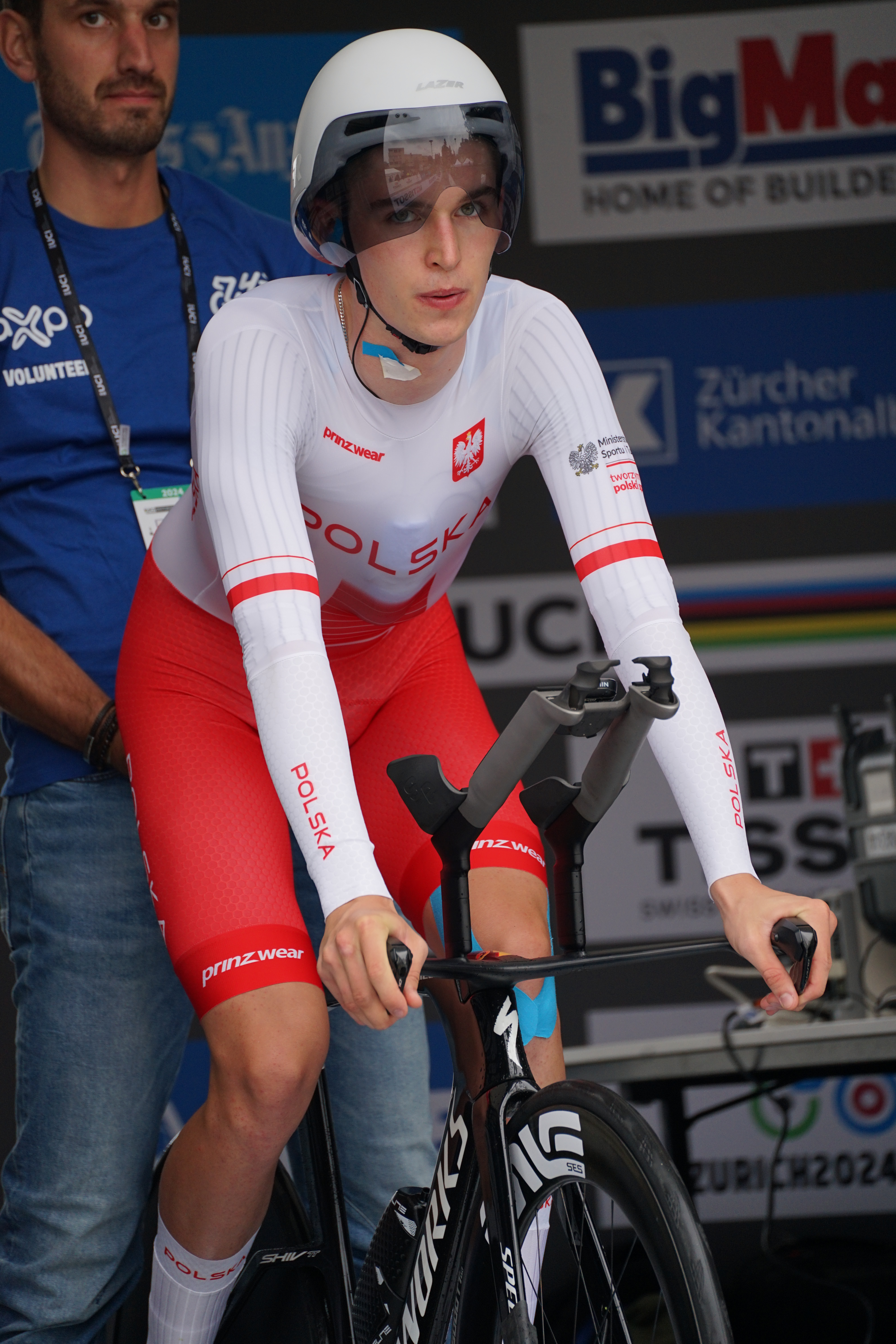
- Gajdulewicz at the 2024 UCI Road World Championships

Personal information
- Born: 22 December 2003 (age 22) Warsaw, Poland
- Height: 1.88 m (6 ft 2 in)
- Weight: 67 kg (148 lb)

Cycling career
- Sport: Cycling
- Current team: ATT Investments
- Discipline: Road
- Role: Rider

Amateur teams
- 2020–2021: Warszawski Klub Kolarski
- 2023–2024: Vendée U

Professional team
- 2022: HRE Mazowsze Serce Polski
- 2025: Mazowsze Serce Polski
- 2026–: ATT Investments

Mateusz Gajdulewicz (born 12 December 2003) is a Polish professional racing cyclist, who rides for UCI Continental team ATT Investments.

== Major results ==
2020
2nd Time trial, National Junior Road Championships
2021
1st Time trial, National Junior Road Championships
9th Time trial, UEC European Junior Road Championships
2022
1st Overall Poland–Ukraine
1st General Final Puchar Polski
1st Górskie Szosowe Mistrzostwa Polski
2nd Time trial, National Under-23 Road Championships
2023
2nd Time trial, National Under-23 Road Championships
9th Chrono des Nations Under-23
2024
National Under-23 Road Championships

2nd Time trial
3rd Road race

3rd Vuelta a la Comunidad de Madrid Under-23
10th Time trial, UEC European Under-23 Road Championships
2025
National Road Championships

3rd Road race
3rd Under-23 time trial

UCI Under-23 Road World Championships

5th Road race
7th Time trial

6th Overall Orlen Nations Grand Prix
8th Overall Course de la Paix U23 – Grand Prix Jeseníky
2026
1st Overall Okolo Jižních Čech
4th Time trial, National Road Championships
