= Turconi =

Turconi is a surname. Notable people with the surname include:

- Alfonso Turconi (It) (1738–1805), Italian politician and philanthropist
- Angelo Turconi (1923–2011), Italian footballer
- Filippo Turconi (born 2005), Italian racing cyclist
