= Tom Donnenwirth =

French cyclist

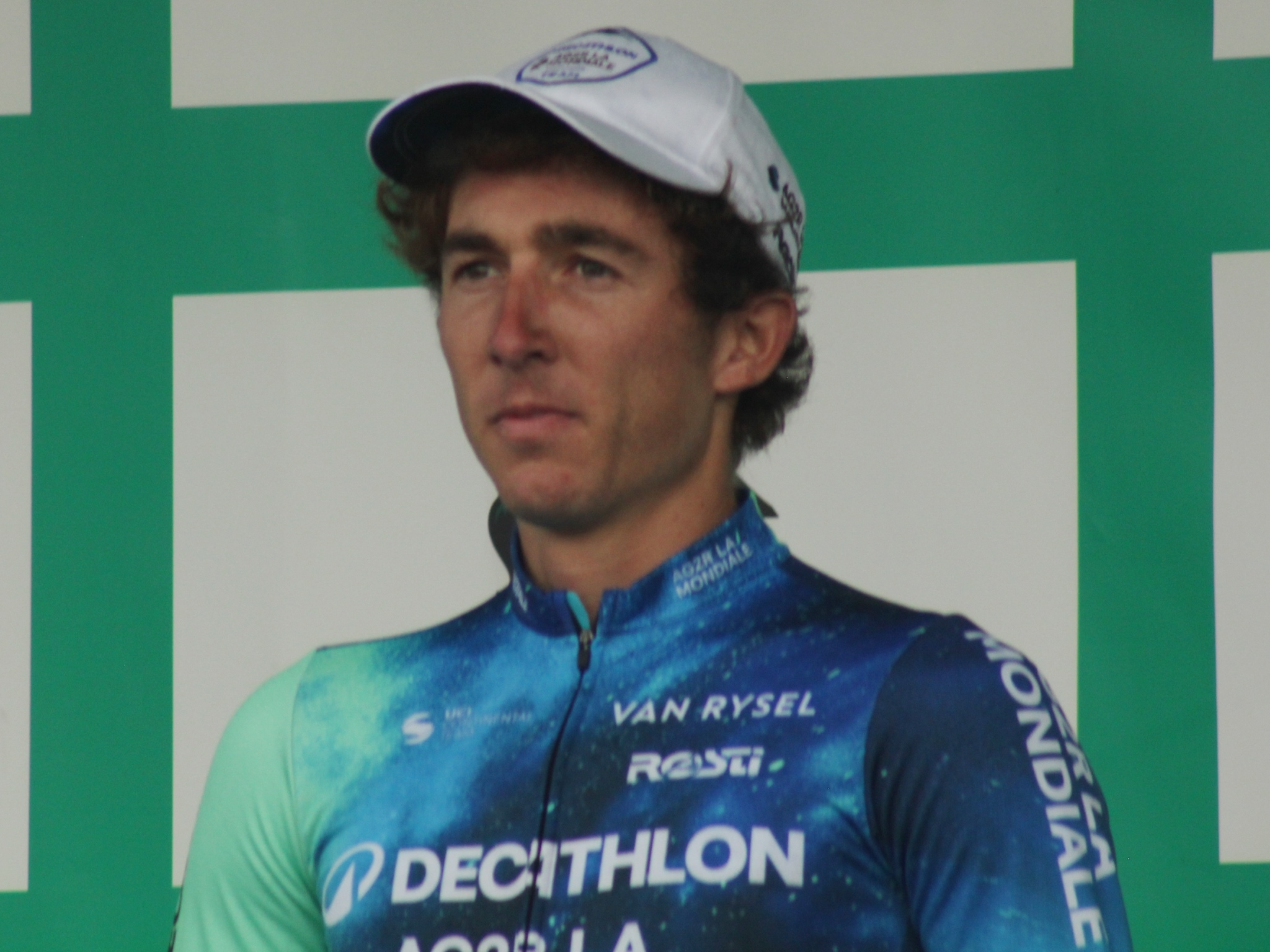
- Tom Donnenwirth in 2024

Personal information
- Born: 19 January 1998 (age 28) Aurillac, France
- Height: 1.78 m (5 ft 10 in)
- Weight: 63 kg (139 lb)

Cycling career
- Sport: Cycling
- Current team: Groupama–FDJ United
- Discipline: Road
- Role: Rider

Amateur teams
- 2020–2022: Pau Vélo 64
- 2022: UV Marie-Galante
- 2023: SCO Dijon–Team Material-velo.com

Professional teams
- 2024: Decathlon–AG2R La Mondiale Development Team
- 2025–: Groupama–FDJ

Tom Donnenwirth (born 19 January 1998) is a French road cyclist, who rides for UCI WorldTeam Groupama–FDJ United.

== Major results ==
2022
2nd Overall Tour de Guadeloupe
2023
1st Laukizko Udal Saria
3rd Overall Tour de la Mirabelle
2024
3rd Overall Tour of Britain
3rd Overall Alpes Isère Tour
4th Overall Tour de l'Ain
2025 (1 pro win)
1st Stage 1 Tour de l'Ain
5th Muscat Classic
