= Embret Svestad-Bårdseng =

Norwegian cyclist (born 2002)

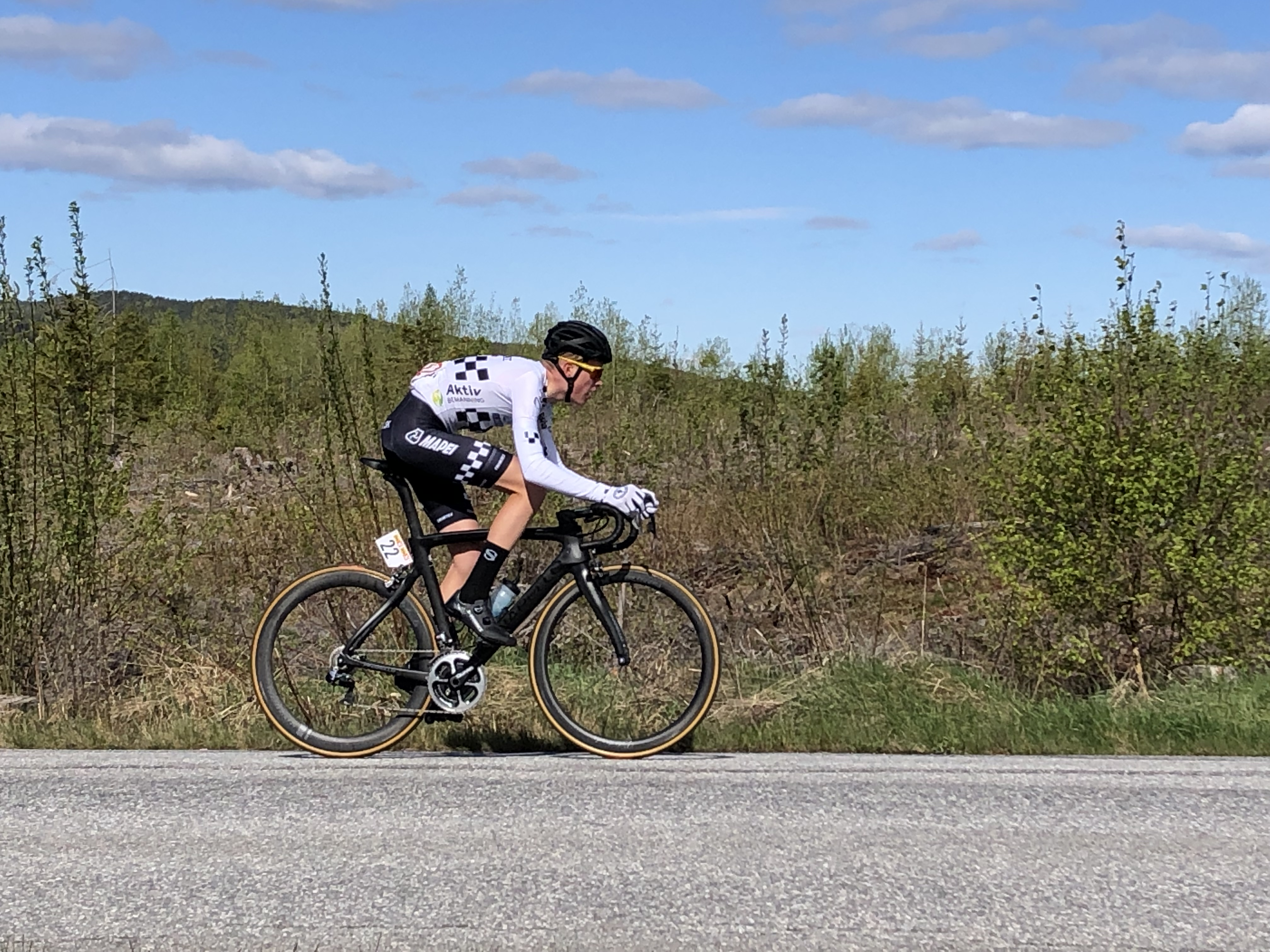
- Svestad-Bårdseng in 2019

Personal information
- Born: 1 September 2002 (age 24) Oslo, Norway
- Height: 1.85 m (6 ft 1 in)

Cycling career
- Sport: Cycling
- Current team: Netcompany–Ineos
- Discipline: Road
- Role: Rider
- Rider type: Climber

Amateur teams
- 2019–2020: Glåmdal SK
- 2021: IK Hero

Professional teams
- 2021: Team Coop (stagiaire)
- 2022: Team Coop
- 2023: Human Powered Health
- 2024: Arkéa–B&B Hôtels Continentale
- 2025: Arkéa–B&B Hotels
- 2026–: Netcompany INEOS

Embret Svestad-Bårdseng (born 1 September 2002) is a Norwegian professional racing cyclist who rides for UCI WorldTeam Netcompany–Ineos.

== Major results ==
2019
3rd Road race, National Junior Road Championships
2021
2nd Gylne Gutuer
2022
1st Mountains classification, International Tour of Hellas
2nd Sundvolden GP
6th Overall South Aegean Tour
2023
8th Overall Tour de l'Avenir
2024
4th Il Piccolo Lombardia
5th Overall Alpes Isère Tour
5th Overall Giro della Regione Friuli Venezia Giulia
2025
8th Overall Tour of Oman
2026
8th Overall Czech Tour
