= Nate Pringle =

Australian cyclist

Personal information
- Born: 16 October 2003 (age 23)

Cycling career
- Sport: Cycling
- Current team: Decathlon CMA CGM Development Team
- Discipline: Road
- Role: Rider
- Rider type: Time trialist

Amateur teams
- 2023: BJ Carter Builders
- 2024: Oxford Edge Cycling Team

Professional teams
- 2025: Red Bull–Bora–Hansgrohe Rookies
- 2026–: Decathlon CMA CGM Development Team
Medal record
Men's road cycling
Representing New Zealand
World Championships
| Silver medal – second place | 2025 Kigali | Under-23 time trial |

Nate Pringle (born 16 October 2003) is a New Zealand cyclist, who currently rides for UCI Continental team Decathlon CMA CGM Development Team. He won a silver medal in the under-23 time trial at the 2025 UCI Road World Championships.

== Major results ==
2024
1st Le Race
2025
1st Time trial, National Under-23 Road Championships
2nd Time trial, UCI Road World Under-23 Championships
7th Overall Sibiu Cycling Tour

1st Young rider classification
