= Ruslan Hryshchenko =

Ukrainian bicycle racer

Personal information
- Full name: Ruslan Hryshchenko
- Born: 4 February 1981 (age 45) Simferopol, Crimean Oblast, Ukrainian SSR, Soviet Union (now Ukraine)

Cycling career
- Sport: Cycling
- Current team: Retired
- Discipline: Road
- Role: Rider

Amateur team
- 2005: G.S. Bottoli–Artoni

Professional teams
- 2002–2004: Landbouwkrediet–Colnago
- 2007: MapaMap-BantProfi
- 2008: Amore & Vita–McDonald's
- 2011: Azad University Iran
- 2012: China Jilun Cycling Team
- 2013–2014: Qinghai Tianyoude Cycling Team
- 2015: Team Lvshan Landscape

Ruslan Hryshchenko (Ukrainian: Руслан Грищенко; born 4 February 1981 in Simferopol) is a Ukrainian former professional racing cyclist.

== Major results ==
2001
1st Liège–Bastogne–Liège U23
1st Flèche Ardennaise
1st Stage 5 Thüringen Rundfahrt der U23
3rd Road race, UCI Under-23 World Road Championships
2002
1st Giro del Mendrisiotto
1st Flèche Ardennaise
1st Stage 3 Giro della Valle d'Aosta
2003
3rd Gran Premio di Lugano
2005
1st Piccolo Giro di Lombardia
