= Max Bock (cyclist) =

German cyclist

Personal information
- Born: 8 April 2005 (age 21) Mainz, Germany
- Height: 1.74 m (5 ft 9 in)
- Weight: 56 kg (123 lb)

Cycling career
- Sport: Cycling
- Current team: Red Bull–Bora–Hansgrohe Rookies
- Discipline: Road
- Role: Rider
- Rider type: Climber

Amateur teams
- 2022: Team Auto Eder
- 2023: Team Marco Brenner

Professional teams
- 2024–2025: Équipe Continentale Groupama–FDJ
- 2026–: Red Bull–Bora–Hansgrohe Rookies

Max Bock (born 10 March 2005) is a German cyclist, who currently rides for UCI Continental team Red Bull–Bora–Hansgrohe Rookies.

== Major results ==
2023
1st Championnats d'Europe des Grimpeurs Junior
2025
4th Road race, National Under-23 Road Championships
5th Overall Alpes Isère Tour
8th Overall Tour de l'Avenir
9th Road race, European Under-23 Road Championships
2026
3rd Overall Giro della Valle d'Aosta
4th Road race, National Under-23 Road Championships
6th Overall Czech Tour
6th G.P. Palio del Recioto
9th Overall Giro di Sardegna
9th Overall Giro d'Italia Next Gen
