= Lorenzo Finn =

Italian cyclist (born 2006)

Personal information
- Full name: Lorenzo Mark Finn
- Born: 19 December 2006 (age 19) Genoa, Italy
- Height: 1.81 m (5 ft 11 in)
- Weight: 63 kg (139 lb)

Cycling career
- Sport: Cycling
- Current team: Red Bull–Bora–Hansgrohe Rookies
- Discipline: Road
- Role: Rider

Amateur teams
- 2023: CPS Professional Team
- 2024: Team Grenke–Auto Eder

Professional team
- 2025–: Red Bull–Bora–Hansgrohe Rookies
Medal record
Men's road cycling
Representing Italy
World Championships
Gold medal – first place	2024 Zürich	Junior road race
Gold medal – first place	2025 Kigali	Under-23 road race

Lorenzo Mark Finn (born 19 December 2006) is an Italian cyclist, who currently rides for UCI Continental team Red Bull–Bora–Hansgrohe Rookies. In 2024, he won the Junior Road Race World Championships.

== Career ==
In September 2024, he won the UCI Road World Championships – Junior men's road race in Zurich.
The following year, he won the Under-23 Men's Road Race at the 2025 UCI World Championships in Kigali.

In August 2026, he won the Tour de l'Avenir stage race, winning the mountain time trial as well as the final stage in the leader's yellow jersey. Having also won the Giro Next Gen that year he became the first rider since Gianbattista Baronchelli in 1973 to win both events in a season.

== Personal life ==
From Avegno, Liguria, he attended school in Genoa. His father is from Sheffield, England.

== Major results ==
2023
2nd Overall Giro della Lunigiana

1st Young rider classification

5th Time trial, National Junior Road Championships
2024
UCI Junior Road World Championships

1st Road race
7th Time trial

National Junior Road Championships

1st Road race
1st Time trial

1st Overall Aubel–Thimister–Stavelot

1st Points classification
1st Stage 3

1st Gran Premio Eccellenze Valli del Soligo (TTT)
1st Stage 1 (TTT) Eroica Juniores
2nd Overall Giro della Lunigiana

1st Stage 4

2nd Gran Premio Eccellenze Valli del Soligo
3rd Overall Ain Bugey Valromey Tour
7th Time trial, UEC European Junior Road Championships
2025
UCI Road World Under-23 Championships

1st Road race
4th Time trial

1st Coppa Città di San Daniele
1st Giro del Belvedere
2nd Gran Premio Palio del Recioto
2nd Flèche Ardennaise
3rd Giro della Provincia di Reggio Calabria
4th Overall Tour de l'Avenir
5th Liège–Bastogne–Liège Espoirs
6th Overall Giro Next Gen

1st Mountains classification

2026 (3 pro wins)
1st Overall Sibiu Cycling Tour

1st Mountains classification
1st Young rider classification
1st Stages 2 & 3

1st Overall Tour de l'Avenir

1st Mountains classification
1st Young rider classification
1st Stages 5 (ITT) & 7

1st Overall Giro Next Gen

1st Stage 6 & 8 (ITT)

1st Giro del Belvedere
1st Gran Premio Palio del Recioto
1st (TTT) Trofeo Ses Salines
