= 2024 Tour of Britain =

Cycling race

2024 UCI ProSeries
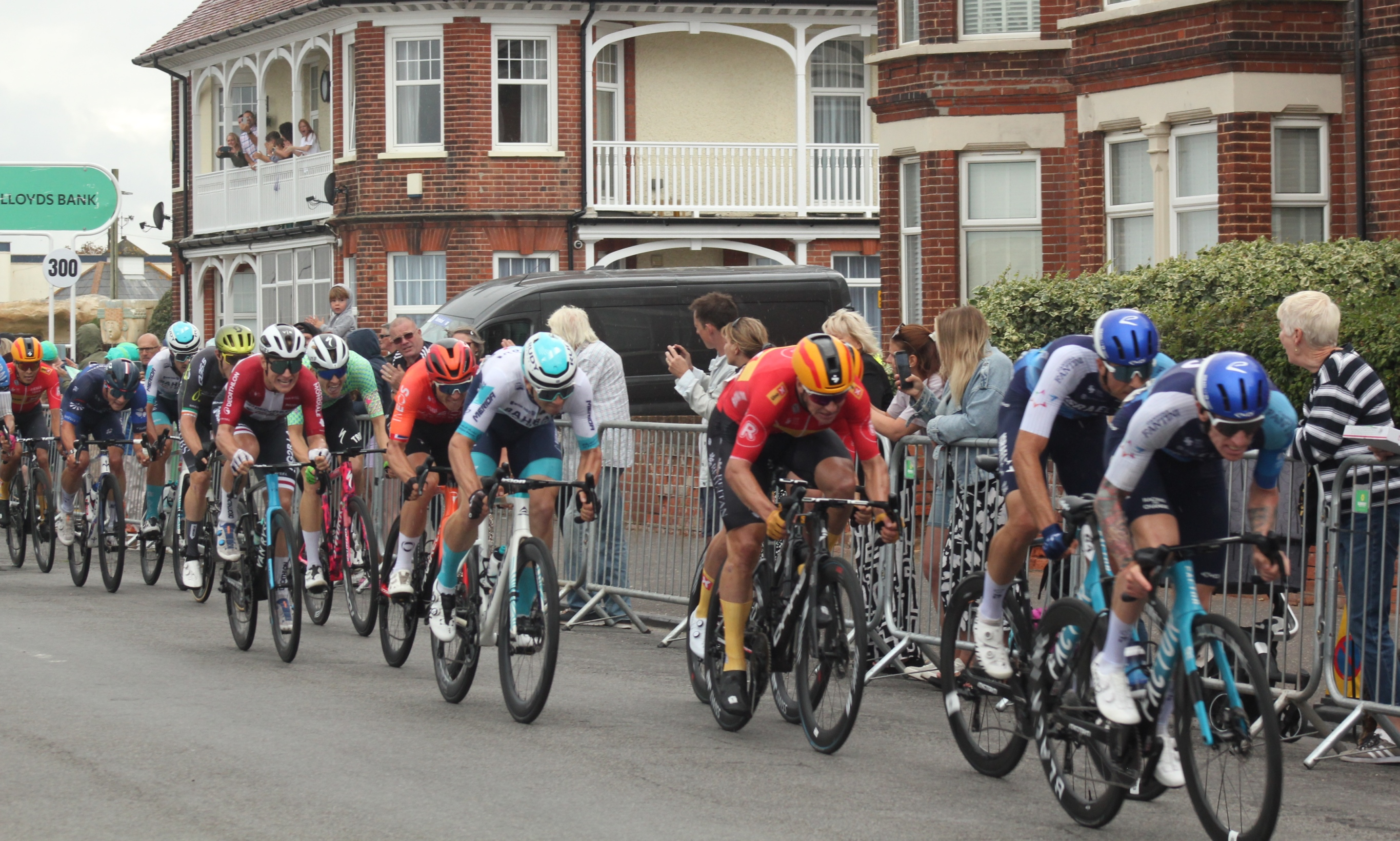
- The final sprint in Felixstowe

Race details
- Dates: 3 – 8 September 2024
- Stages: 6
- Distance: 943.9 km (586.5 mi)
- Winning time: 21h 25' 14"

Results
Jersey awarded to the overall winner	Winner	Stephen Williams (GBR)	(Israel–Premier Tech)
	Second	Oscar Onley (GBR)	(Team dsm–firmenich PostNL)
	Third	Tom Donnenwirth (FRA)	(Decathlon–AG2R La Mondiale Development Team)
Jersey awarded to the points classification winner	Points	Ethan Vernon (GBR)	(Israel–Premier Tech)
Jersey awarded to the mountains classification winner	Mountains	Callum Thornley (GBR)	(Trinity Racing)
Jersey awarded to the youth classification winner	Youth	Oscar Onley (GBR)	(Team dsm–firmenich PostNL)
Jersey awarded to the combativity classification winner	Combativity	Ben Swift (GBR)	(Ineos Grenadiers)
	Team	Israel–Premier Tech	

The 2024 Tour of Britain was a men's professional road cycling stage race. It was the 83rd British tour and the 20th edition of the modern version of the Tour of Britain. The race was part of the 2024 UCI ProSeries.

== Teams ==
Four UCI WorldTeams, three UCI ProTeams, ten UCI Continental teams and one national team make up the eighteen teams, from twelve countries in the race.

UCI WorldTeams

- Ineos Grenadiers
- Soudal–Quick-Step
- Team Bahrain Victorious
- Team dsm–firmenich PostNL

UCI ProTeams

- Israel–Premier Tech
- Q36.5 Pro Cycling Team
- Uno-X Mobility

UCI Continental Teams

- Decathlon–AG2R La Mondiale Development Team
- Global 6 United
- Groupama–FDJ Continental Team
- Lidl–Trek Future Racing
- Project Echelon Racing
- Rembe Pro Cycling Team Sauerland
- Sabgal–Anicolor
- Saint Piran
- Trinity Racing
- Van Rysel–Roubaix

National Teams

- Great Britain

== Schedule ==
Stage hosts were announced on 10 July 2024.

Stage characteristics and winners
Stage	Date	Route	Distance	Type	Stage winner
1	3 September	Kelso to Kelso	181.9 km (113.0 mi)	Hilly stage	Paul Magnier (FRA)
2	4 September	Darlington to Redcar	152.1 km (94.5 mi)	Hilly stage	Stephen Williams (GBR)
3	5 September	Sheffield to Barnsley	166.1 km (103.2 mi)	Hilly stage	Stephen Williams (GBR)
4	6 September	Derby to Newark	138.5 km (86.1 mi)	Flat stage	Paul Magnier (FRA)
5	7 September	Northampton to Northampton	146.9 km (91.3 mi)	Flat stage	Paul Magnier (FRA)
6	8 September	Lowestoft to Felixstowe	158.4 km (98.4 mi)	Flat stage	Matevž Govekar (SLO)
Total			943.9 km (586.5 mi)		

== Stages ==
=== Stage 1 ===
3 September 2024 – Kelso to Kelso, 181.9 km (113.0 mi)

Stage 1 Result
Rank	Rider	Team	Time
1	Paul Magnier (FRA)	Soudal–Quick-Step	4h 11' 45"
2	Ethan Vernon (GBR)	Israel–Premier Tech	+ 0"
3	Robert Donaldson (GBR)	Trinity Racing	+ 0"
4	Tom Pidcock (GBR)	Ineos Grenadiers	+ 0"
5	Casper van Uden (NED)	Team dsm–firmenich PostNL	+ 0"
6	Rory Townsend (IRL)	Q36.5 Pro Cycling Team	+ 0"
7	Edoardo Zambanini (ITA)	Team Bahrain Victorious	+ 0"
8	Matevž Govekar (SLO)	Team Bahrain Victorious	+ 0"
9	Jake Stewart (GBR)	Israel–Premier Tech	+ 0"
10	Norman Vahtra (EST)	Van Rysel–Roubaix	+ 0"

General classification after Stage 1
Rank	Rider	Team	Time
1	Paul Magnier (FRA)	Soudal–Quick-Step	4h 11' 35"
2	Julius Johansen (DEN)	Sabgal–Anicolor	+ 1"
3	Ethan Vernon (GBR)	Israel–Premier Tech	+ 4"
4	Robert Donaldson (GBR)	Trinity Racing	+ 6"
5	Tom Pidcock (GBR)	Ineos Grenadiers	+ 8"
6	Jonas Abrahamsen (NOR)	Uno-X Mobility	+ 9"
7	Ben Turner (GBR)	Ineos Grenadiers	+ 9"
8	Casper van Uden (NED)	Team dsm–firmenich PostNL	+ 10"
9	Rory Townsend (IRL)	Q36.5 Pro Cycling Team	+ 10"
10	Edoardo Zambanini (ITA)	Team Bahrain Victorious	+ 10"

=== Stage 2 ===
4 September 2024 – Darlington to Redcar, 152.1 km (94.5 mi)

Stage 2 Result
Rank	Rider	Team	Time
1	Stephen Williams (GBR)	Israel–Premier Tech	3h 37' 25"
2	Julian Alaphilippe (FRA)	Soudal–Quick-Step	+ 0"
3	Oscar Onley (GBR)	Team dsm–firmenich PostNL	+ 0"
4	Joseph Blackmore (GBR)	Israel–Premier Tech	+ 21"
5	Remco Evenepoel (BEL)	Soudal–Quick-Step	+ 21"
6	Louis Sutton (GBR)	Great Britain	+ 21"
7	Tom Donnenwirth (FRA)	Decathlon–AG2R La Mondiale Development Team	+ 21"
8	Mark Donovan (GBR)	Q36.5 Pro Cycling Team	+ 21"
9	Paul Magnier (FRA)	Soudal–Quick-Step	+ 1' 27"
10	Matevž Govekar (SLO)	Team Bahrain Victorious	+ 1' 27"

General classification after Stage 2
Rank	Rider	Team	Time
1	Stephen Williams (GBR)	Israel–Premier Tech	7h 49' 00"
2	Oscar Onley (GBR)	Team dsm–firmenich PostNL	+ 6"
3	Julian Alaphilippe (FRA)	Soudal–Quick-Step	+ 16"
4	Mark Donovan (GBR)	Q36.5 Pro Cycling Team	+ 31"
5	Joseph Blackmore (GBR)	Israel–Premier Tech	+ 31"
6	Tom Donnenwirth (FRA)	Decathlon–AG2R La Mondiale Development Team	+ 31"
7	Louis Sutton (GBR)	Great Britain	+ 31"
8	Remco Evenepoel (BEL)	Soudal–Quick-Step	+ 31"
9	Paul Magnier (FRA)	Soudal–Quick-Step	+ 1' 27"
10	Julius Johansen (DEN)	Sabgal–Anicolor	+ 1' 28"

=== Stage 3 ===
5 September 2024 – Sheffield to Barnsley, 166.1 km (103.2 mi)

Stage 3 Result
Rank	Rider	Team	Time
1	Stephen Williams (GBR)	Israel–Premier Tech	3h 50' 03"
2	Paul Magnier (FRA)	Soudal–Quick-Step	+ 0"
3	Edoardo Zambanini (ITA)	Team Bahrain Victorious	+ 0"
4	Jelte Krijnsen (NED)	Q36.5 Pro Cycling Team	+ 0"
5	Oscar Onley (GBR)	Team dsm–firmenich PostNL	+ 0"
6	Tom Pidcock (GBR)	Ineos Grenadiers	+ 0"
7	Markus Hoelgaard (NOR)	Uno-X Mobility	+ 0"
8	Mark Donovan (GBR)	Q36.5 Pro Cycling Team	+ 0"
9	Joseph Blackmore (GBR)	Israel–Premier Tech	+ 0"
10	Callum Thornley (GBR)	Trinity Racing	+ 0"

General classification after Stage 3
Rank	Rider	Team	Time
1	Stephen Williams (GBR)	Israel–Premier Tech	11h 38' 53"
2	Oscar Onley (GBR)	Team dsm–firmenich PostNL	+ 16"
3	Mark Donovan (GBR)	Q36.5 Pro Cycling Team	+ 41"
4	Joseph Blackmore (GBR)	Israel–Premier Tech	+ 41"
5	Tom Donnenwirth (FRA)	Decathlon–AG2R La Mondiale Development Team	+ 41"
6	Louis Sutton (GBR)	Great Britain	+ 1' 05"
7	Paul Magnier (FRA)	Soudal–Quick-Step	+ 1' 31"
8	Julian Alaphilippe (FRA)	Soudal–Quick-Step	+ 1' 33"
9	Edoardo Zambanini (ITA)	Team Bahrain Victorious	+ 1' 43"
10	Jelte Krijnsen (NED)	Q36.5 Pro Cycling Team	+ 1' 44"

=== Stage 4 ===
6 September 2024 – Derby to Newark, 138.5 km (86.1 mi)

Stage 4 Result
Rank	Rider	Team	Time
1	Paul Magnier (FRA)	Soudal–Quick-Step	3h 11' 54"
2	Ethan Vernon (GBR)	Israel–Premier Tech	+ 0"
3	Erlend Blikra (NOR)	Uno-X Mobility	+ 0"
4	Noah Hobbs (GBR)	Groupama–FDJ Continental Team	+ 0"
5	Matevž Govekar (SLO)	Team Bahrain Victorious	+ 0"
6	Robert Donaldson (GBR)	Trinity Racing	+ 0"
7	Ethan Hayter (GBR)	Ineos Grenadiers	+ 0"
8	Rory Townsend (IRL)	Q36.5 Pro Cycling Team	+ 0"
9	Casper van Uden (NED)	Team dsm–firmenich PostNL	+ 0"
10	Tom Pidcock (GBR)	Ineos Grenadiers	+ 0"

General classification after Stage 4
Rank	Rider	Team	Time
1	Stephen Williams (GBR)	Israel–Premier Tech	14h 50' 47"
2	Oscar Onley (GBR)	Team dsm–firmenich PostNL	+ 16"
3	Mark Donovan (GBR)	Q36.5 Pro Cycling Team	+ 40"
4	Joseph Blackmore (GBR)	Israel–Premier Tech	+ 41"
5	Tom Donnenwirth (FRA)	Decathlon–AG2R La Mondiale Development Team	+ 41"
6	Louis Sutton (GBR)	Great Britain	+ 1' 05"
7	Paul Magnier (FRA)	Soudal–Quick-Step	+ 1' 21"
8	Julian Alaphilippe (FRA)	Soudal–Quick-Step	+ 1' 33"
9	Jelte Krijnsen (NED)	Q36.5 Pro Cycling Team	+ 1' 42"
10	Edoardo Zambanini (ITA)	Team Bahrain Victorious	+ 1' 43"

=== Stage 5 ===
7 September 2024 – Northampton to Northampton, 146.9 km (91.3 mi)

Stage 5 Result
Rank	Rider	Team	Time
1	Paul Magnier (FRA)	Soudal–Quick-Step	3h 12' 09"
2	Erlend Blikra (NOR)	Uno-X Mobility	+ 0"
3	Ethan Vernon (GBR)	Israel–Premier Tech	+ 0"
4	Matevž Govekar (SLO)	Team Bahrain Victorious	+ 0"
5	Rasmus Pedersen (DEN)	Decathlon–AG2R La Mondiale Development Team	+ 0"
6	Robert Donaldson (GBR)	Trinity Racing	+ 0"
7	Ethan Hayter (GBR)	Ineos Grenadiers	+ 0"
8	Tom Donnenwirth (FRA)	Decathlon–AG2R La Mondiale Development Team	+ 0"
9	Rory Townsend (IRL)	Q36.5 Pro Cycling Team	+ 0"
10	Casper van Uden (NED)	Team dsm–firmenich PostNL	+ 0"

General classification after Stage 5
Rank	Rider	Team	Time
1	Stephen Williams (GBR)	Israel–Premier Tech	18h 02' 56"
2	Oscar Onley (GBR)	Team dsm–firmenich PostNL	+ 16"
3	Mark Donovan (GBR)	Q36.5 Pro Cycling Team	+ 40"
4	Tom Donnenwirth (FRA)	Decathlon–AG2R La Mondiale Development Team	+ 41"
5	Joseph Blackmore (GBR)	Israel–Premier Tech	+ 41"
6	Paul Magnier (FRA)	Soudal–Quick-Step	+ 1' 11"
7	Jelte Krijnsen (NED)	Q36.5 Pro Cycling Team	+ 1' 42"
8	Edoardo Zambanini (ITA)	Team Bahrain Victorious	+ 1' 43"
9	Julius Johansen (DEN)	Sabgal–Anicolor	+ 1' 45"
10	Julian Alaphilippe (FRA)	Soudal–Quick-Step	+ 1' 45"

=== Stage 6 ===
8 September 2024 – Lowestoft to Felixstowe, 158.4 km (98.4 mi)

Stage 6 Result
Rank	Rider	Team	Time
1	Matevž Govekar (SLO)	Team Bahrain Victorious	3h 22' 18"
2	Rasmus Pedersen (DEN)	Decathlon–AG2R La Mondiale Development Team	+ 0"
3	Ben Swift (GBR)	Ineos Grenadiers	+ 0"
4	Ethan Vernon (GBR)	Israel–Premier Tech	+ 0"
5	Erlend Blikra (NOR)	Uno-X Mobility	+ 0"
6	Rory Townsend (IRL)	Q36.5 Pro Cycling Team	+ 0"
7	Noah Hobbs (GBR)	Groupama–FDJ Continental Team	+ 0"
8	Robert Donaldson (GBR)	Trinity Racing	+ 0"
9	Jonas Abrahamsen (NOR)	Uno-X Mobility	+ 0"
10	Sean Flynn (GBR)	Team dsm–firmenich PostNL	+ 0"

General classification after Stage 6
Rank	Rider	Team	Time
1	Stephen Williams (GBR)	Israel–Premier Tech	21h 25' 14"
2	Oscar Onley (GBR)	Team dsm–firmenich PostNL	+ 16"
3	Tom Donnenwirth (FRA)	Decathlon–AG2R La Mondiale Development Team	+ 36"
4	Mark Donovan (GBR)	Q36.5 Pro Cycling Team	+ 40"
5	Joseph Blackmore (GBR)	Israel–Premier Tech	+ 41"
6	Jelte Krijnsen (NED)	Q36.5 Pro Cycling Team	+ 1' 39"
7	Edoardo Zambanini (ITA)	Team Bahrain Victorious	+ 1' 40"
8	Mathias Bregnhøj (DEN)	Sabgal–Anicolor	+ 1' 58"
9	Noa Isidore (FRA)	Decathlon–AG2R La Mondiale Development Team	+ 1' 58"
10	Sean Flynn (GBR)	Team dsm–firmenich PostNL	+ 2' 03"

== Classification leadership table ==
Classification leadership by stage
Stage	Winner	General classification	Points classification	Mountains classification	Young rider classification	Team classification	Combativity award
1	Paul Magnier	Paul Magnier	Julius Johansen	Callum Thornley	Paul Magnier	Israel–Premier Tech	Callum Thornley
2	Stephen Williams	Stephen Williams	Julius Johansen	Callum Thornley	Oscar Onley	Israel–Premier Tech	Remco Evenepoel
3	Stephen Williams	Stephen Williams	Stephen Williams	Callum Thornley	Oscar Onley	Israel–Premier Tech	Louis Sutton
4	Paul Magnier	Stephen Williams	Paul Magnier	Callum Thornley	Oscar Onley	Israel–Premier Tech	Rowan Baker
5	Paul Magnier	Stephen Williams	Paul Magnier	Callum Thornley	Oscar Onley	Israel–Premier Tech	Connor Swift
6	Matevž Govekar	Stephen Williams	Ethan Vernon	Callum Thornley	Oscar Onley	Israel–Premier Tech	Callum Thornley
Final		Stephen Williams	Ethan Vernon	Callum Thornley	Oscar Onley	Israel–Premier Tech	Ben Swift

== Classification standings ==
Legend
Denotes the winner of the general classification	Denotes the winner of the mountains classification
Denotes the winner of the points classification	Denotes the winner of the young rider classification
Denotes the winner of the combativity award	

=== General classification ===
Final general classification (1–10)
Rank	Rider	Team	Time
1	Stephen Williams (GBR)	Israel–Premier Tech	21h 25' 14"
2	Oscar Onley (GBR)	Team dsm–firmenich PostNL	+ 16"
3	Tom Donnenwirth (FRA)	Decathlon–AG2R La Mondiale Development Team	+ 36"
4	Mark Donovan (GBR)	Q36.5 Pro Cycling Team	+ 40"
5	Joseph Blackmore (GBR)	Israel–Premier Tech	+ 41"
6	Jelte Krijnsen (NED)	Q36.5 Pro Cycling Team	+ 1' 39"
7	Edoardo Zambanini (ITA)	Team Bahrain Victorious	+ 1' 40"
8	Mathias Bregnhøj (DEN)	Sabgal–Anicolor	+ 1' 58"
9	Noa Isidore (FRA)	Decathlon–AG2R La Mondiale Development Team	+ 1' 58"
10	Sean Flynn (GBR)	Team dsm–firmenich PostNL	+ 2' 03"

=== Points classification ===
Final points classification (1–10)
Rank	Rider	Team	Points
1	Ethan Vernon (GBR)	Israel–Premier Tech	56
2	Stephen Williams (GBR)	Israel–Premier Tech	51
3	Matevž Govekar (SLO)	Team Bahrain Victorious	43
4	Erlend Blikra (NOR)	Uno-X Mobility	36
5	Jelte Krijnsen (NED)	Q36.5 Pro Cycling Team	35
6	Edoardo Zambanini (ITA)	Team Bahrain Victorious	31
7	Julius Johansen (DEN)	Sabgal–Anicolor	30
8	Rasmus Pedersen (DEN)	Decathlon–AG2R La Mondiale Development Team	29
9	Ben Swift (GBR)	Ineos Grenadiers	26
10	Tom Donnenwirth (FRA)	Decathlon–AG2R La Mondiale Development Team	25

=== Mountains classification ===
Final mountains classification (1–10)
Rank	Rider	Team	Points
1	Callum Thornley (GBR)	Trinity Racing	50
2	Dean Harvey (IRL)	Trinity Racing	24
3	Laurent Gervais (CAN)	Project Echelon Racing	20
4	Baptiste Veistroffer (FRA)	Decathlon–AG2R La Mondiale Development Team	19
5	Nickolas Zukowsky (CAN)	Q36.5 Pro Cycling Team	18
6	Julius Johansen (DEN)	Sabgal–Anicolor	14
7	Julian Alaphilippe (FRA)	Soudal–Quick-Step	12
8	Matthew Holmes (GBR)	Great Britain	10
9	Jake Stewart (GBR)	Israel–Premier Tech	10
10	James McKay (GBR)	Saint Piran	10

=== Young rider classification ===
Final young rider classification (1–10)
Rank	Rider	Team	Time
1	Oscar Onley (GBR)	Team dsm–firmenich PostNL	21h 25' 30"
2	Joseph Blackmore (GBR)	Israel–Premier Tech	+ 25"
3	Noa Isidore (FRA)	Decathlon–AG2R La Mondiale Development Team	+ 1' 42"
4	Robert Donaldson (GBR)	Trinity Racing	+ 1' 49"
5	Antoine L'Hote (FRA)	Decathlon–AG2R La Mondiale Development Team	+ 1' 55"
6	Nils Aebersold (SUI)	Lidl–Trek Future Racing	+ 2' 29"
7	Gil Gelders (BEL)	Soudal–Quick-Step	+ 2' 41"
8	Rasmus Pedersen (DEN)	Decathlon–AG2R La Mondiale Development Team	+ 3' 26"
9	Fergus Browning (AUS)	Trinity Racing	+ 5' 16"
10	Liam O'Brien (IRL)	Lidl–Trek Future Racing	+ 10' 05"

=== Team classification ===
Final team classification (1–10)
Rank	Team	Time
1	Israel–Premier Tech	64h 18' 52"
2	(France) Decathlon–AG2R La Mondiale Development Team	+ 1' 29"
3	(Belgium) Soudal–Quick-Step	+ 1' 53"
4	(Switzerland) Q36.5 Pro Cycling Team	+ 2' 51"
5	(United Kingdom) Ineos Grenadiers	+ 2' 55"
6	(Netherlands) Team dsm–firmenich PostNL	+ 3' 30"
7	(Portugal) Sabgal–Anicolor	+ 8' 26"
8	(United Kingdom) Great Britain	+ 9' 48"
9	(United Kingdom) Trinity Racing	+ 10' 14"
10	Team Bahrain Victorious	+ 11' 30"

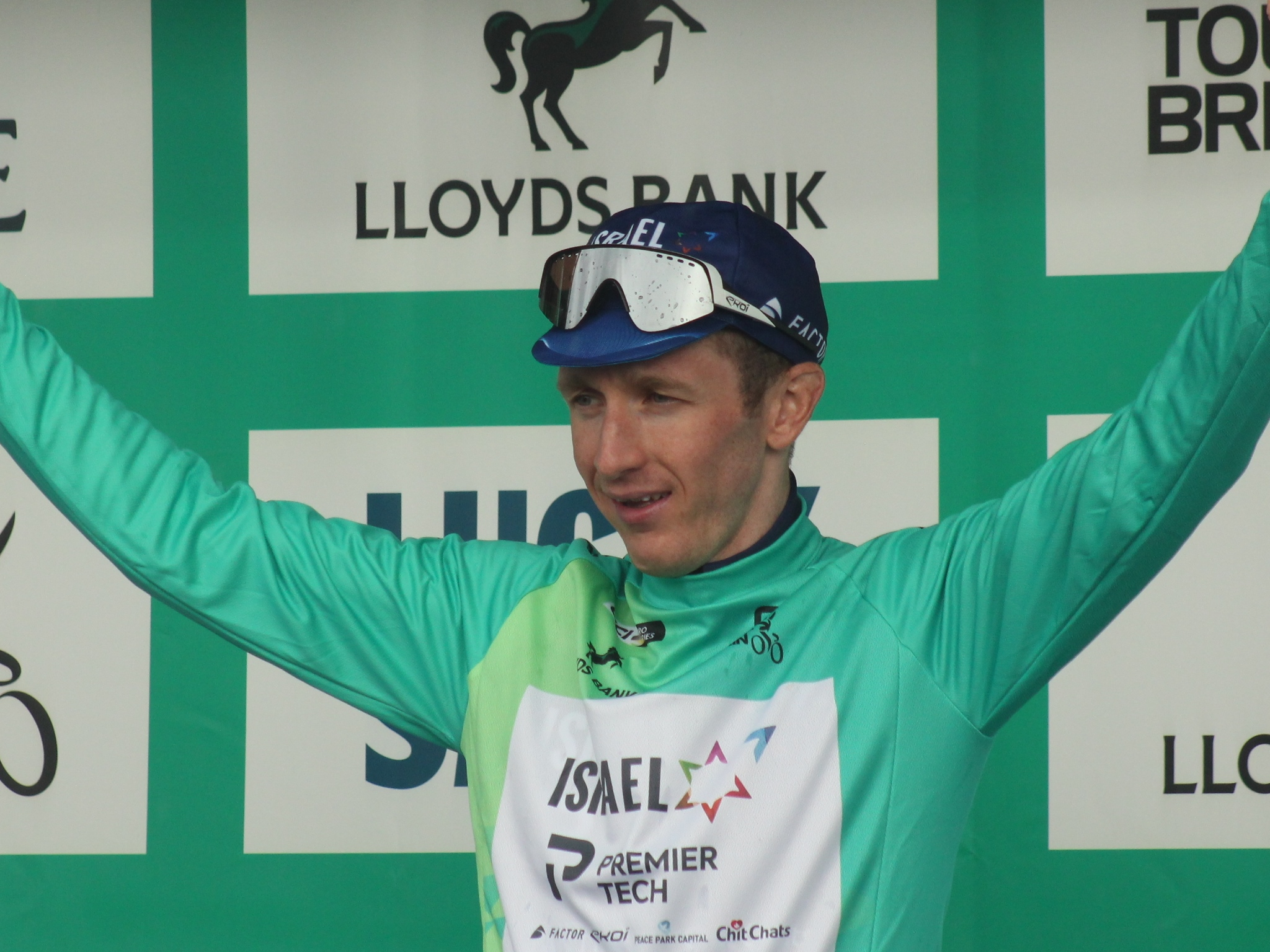
Stephen Williams (General classification)

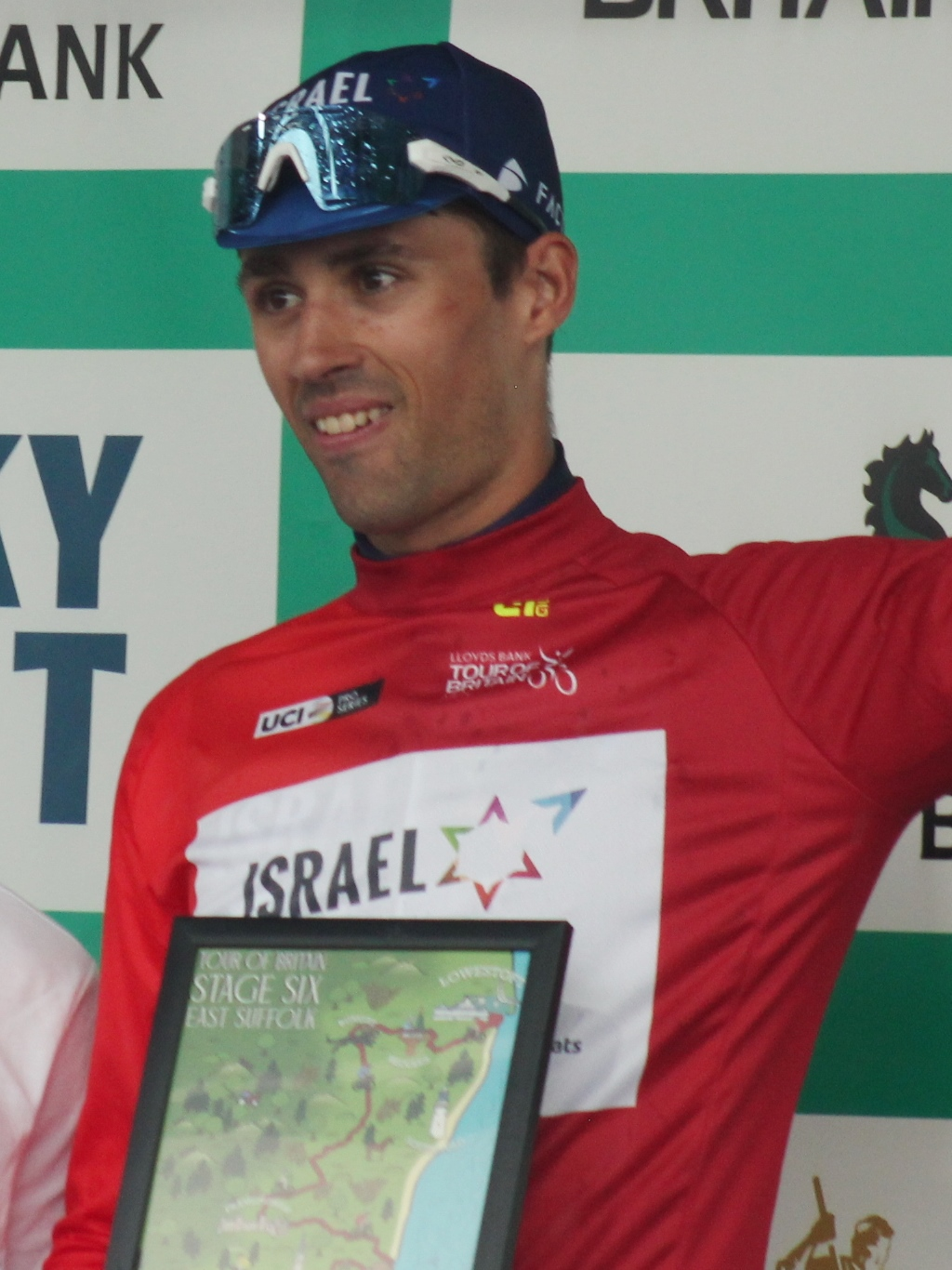
Ethan Vernon (Points classification)

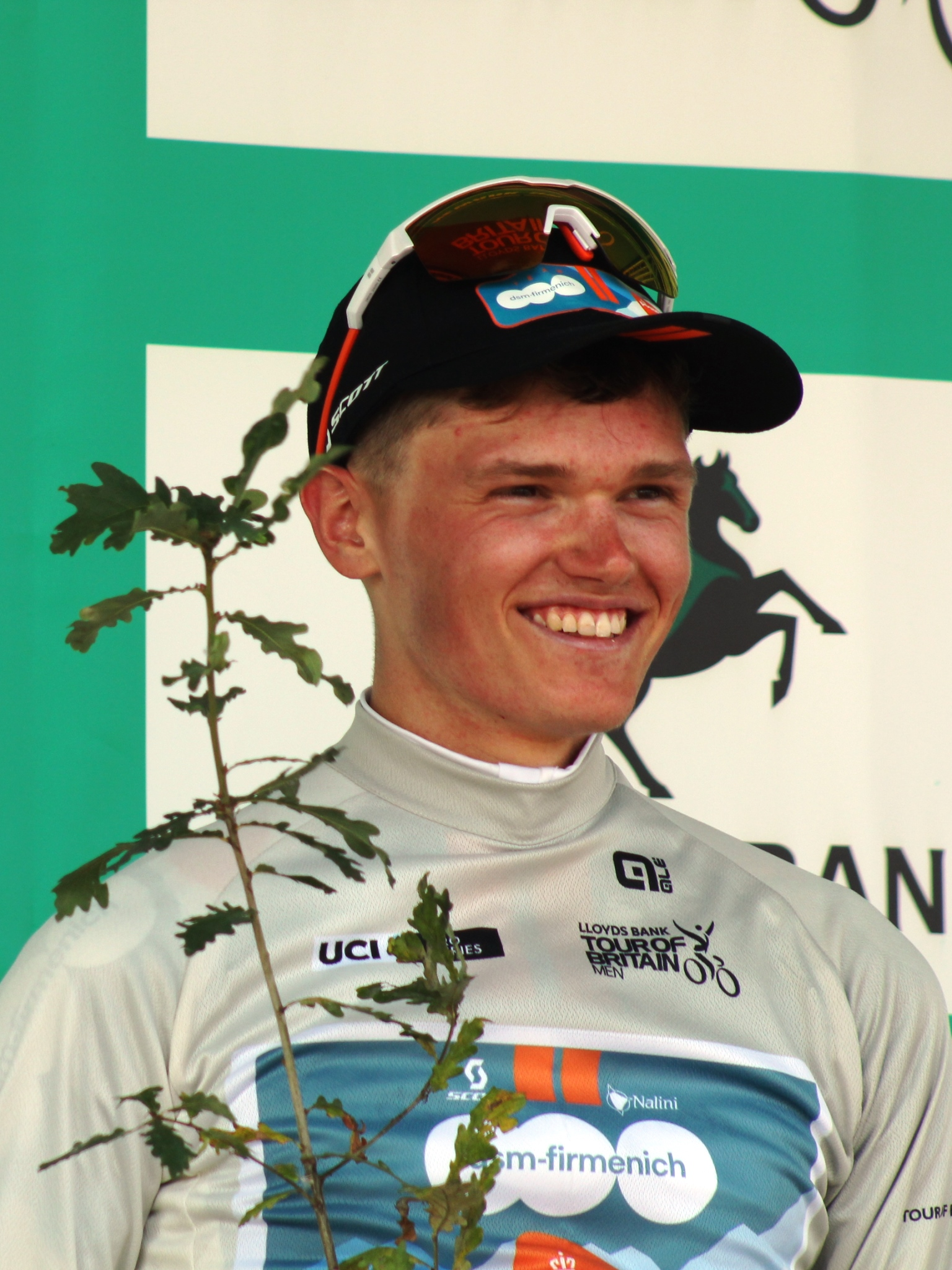
Oscar Onley (Young rider)

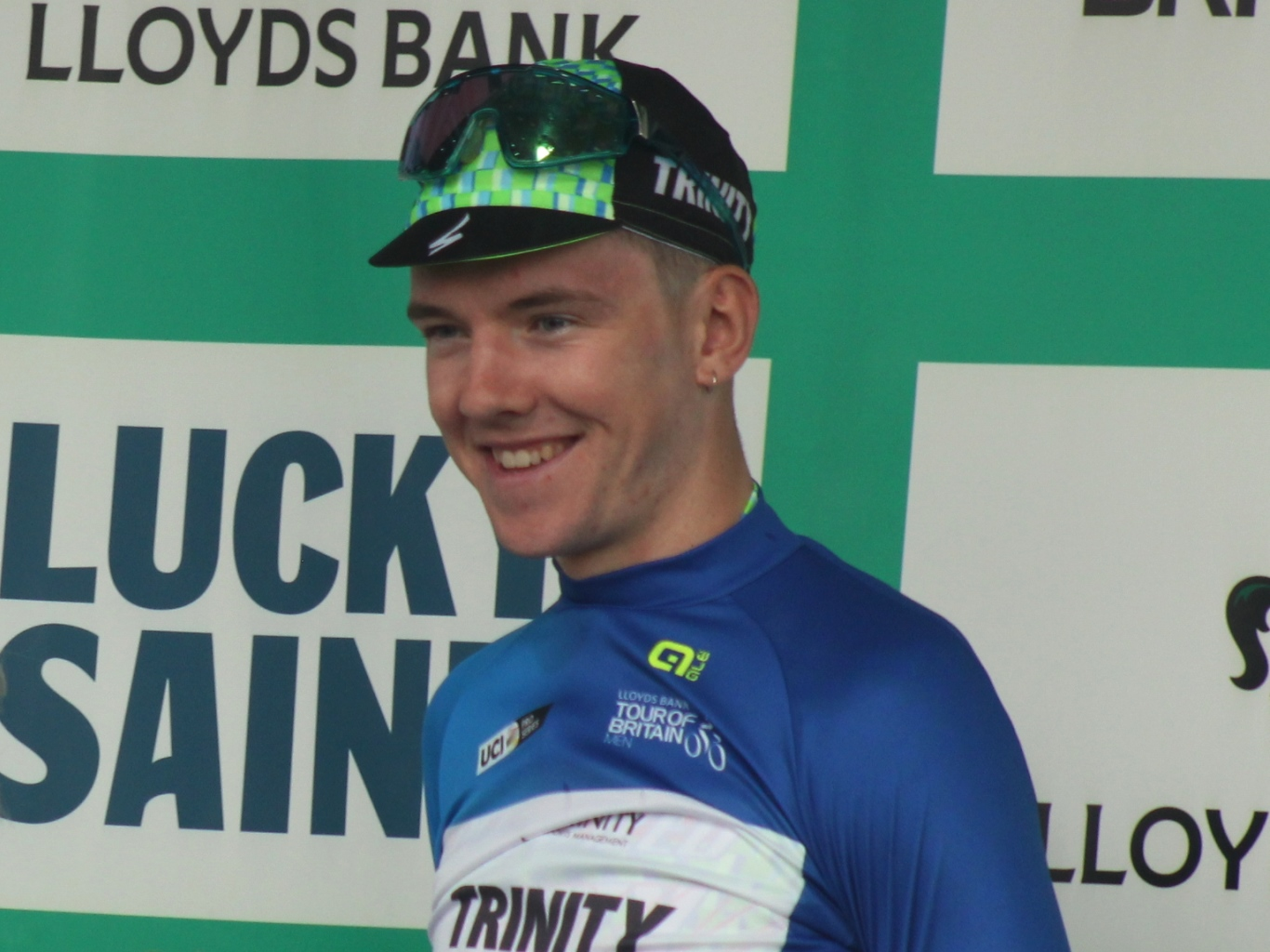
Callum Thornley (Mountains)
