= UCI Road World Championships – Men's under-23 road race =

World championship road cycling race for men aged 23 or under

The UCI Road World Championships - Men's under-23 road race is the annual world championship for road bicycle racing in the discipline of time trial, organised by the world governing body, the Union Cycliste Internationale. The event was first run in 1996. In 2020 no race was held due to the COVID-19 pandemic.

== Medal winners ==
Championships	Gold	Silver	Bronze
1996 Lugano	Giuliano Figueras (ITA)	Roberto Sgambelluri (ITA)	Luca Sironi (ITA)
1997 San Sebastián	Kurt Asle Arvesen (NOR)	Óscar Freire (ESP)	Gerrit Glomser (AUT)
1998 Valkenburg	Ivan Basso (ITA)	Rinaldo Nocentini (ITA)	Danilo Di Luca (ITA)
1999 Verona	Leonardo Giordani (ITA)	Luca Paolini (ITA)	Matthias Kessler (GER)
2000 Plouay	Evgeni Petrov (RUS)	Yaroslav Popovych (UKR)	Lorenzo Bernucci (ITA)
2001 Lisbon	Yaroslav Popovych (UKR)	Giampaolo Caruso (ITA)	Ruslan Gryschenko (UKR)
2002 Zolder and Hasselt	Francesco Chicchi (ITA)	Francisco Gutiérrez (ESP)	David Loosli (SUI)
2003 Hamilton	Sergey Lagutin (UZB)	Johan Van Summeren (BEL)	Thomas Dekker (NED)
2004 Verona	Kanstantsin Sivtsov (BLR)	Thomas Dekker (NED)	Mads Christensen (DEN)
2005 Madrid	Dmitry Grabovskiy (UKR)	William Walker (AUS)	Yevgeni Popov (RUS)
2006 Salzburg	Gerald Ciolek (GER)	Romain Feillu (FRA)	Alexander Khatuntsev (RUS)
2007 Stuttgart	Peter Velits (SVK)	Wesley Sulzberger (AUS)	Jonathan Bellis (GBR)
2008 Varese	Fabio Duarte (COL)	Simone Ponzi (ITA)	John Degenkolb (GER)
2009 Mendrisio	Romain Sicard (FRA)	Carlos Betancur (COL)	Egor Silin (RUS)
2010 Geelong	Michael Matthews (AUS)	John Degenkolb (GER)	Guillaume Boivin (CAN); Taylor Phinney (USA)
2011 Copenhagen	Arnaud Démare (FRA)	Adrien Petit (FRA)	Andrew Fenn (GBR)
2012 Limburg	Alexey Lutsenko (KAZ)	Bryan Coquard (FRA)	Tom Van Asbroeck (BEL)
2013 Firenze	Matej Mohorič (SLO)	Louis Meintjes (RSA)	Sondre Holst Enger (NOR)
2014 Ponferrada	Sven Erik Bystrøm (NOR)	Caleb Ewan (AUS)	Kristoffer Skjerping (NOR)
2015 Richmond	Kévin Ledanois (FRA)	Simone Consonni (ITA)	Anthony Turgis (FRA)
2016 Doha	Kristoffer Halvorsen (NOR)	Pascal Ackermann (GER)	Jakub Mareczko (ITA)
2017 Bergen	Benoit Cosnefroy (FRA)	Lennard Kämna (GER)	Michael Carbel Svendgaard (DEN)
2018 Innsbruck	Marc Hirschi (SUI)	Bjorg Lambrecht (BEL)	Jaakko Hänninen (FIN)
2019 Harrogate	Samuele Battistella (ITA)	Stefan Bissegger (SUI)	Thomas Pidcock (GBR)
2021 Flanders	Filippo Baroncini (ITA)	Biniam Girmay (ERI)	Olav Kooij (NED)
2022 Wollongong	Yevgeniy Fedorov (KAZ)	Mathias Vacek (CZE)	Søren Wærenskjold (NOR)
2023 Glasgow	Axel Laurance (FRA)	António Morgado (POR)	Martin Svrček (SVK)
2024 Zurich	Niklas Behrens (GER)	Martin Svrček (SVK)	Alec Segaert (BEL)
2025 Kigali	Lorenzo Finn (ITA)	Jan Huber (SUI)	Marco Schrettl (AUT)

=== Medallists by nation ===
Rank	Nation	Gold	Silver	Bronze	Total
1	Italy	7	6	4	17
2	France	5	3	1	9
3	Norway	3	0	3	6
4	Germany	2	3	2	7
5	Ukraine	2	1	1	4
6	Kazakhstan	2	0	0	2
7	Australia	1	3	0	4
8	Switzerland	1	2	1	4
9	Slovakia	1	1	1	3
10	Colombia	1	1	0	2
11	Russia	1	0	3	4
12	Belarus	1	0	0	1
12	Slovenia	1	0	0	1
12	Uzbekistan	1	0	0	1
15	Belgium	0	2	2	4
16	Spain	0	2	0	2
17	Netherlands	0	1	2	3
18	Czech Republic	0	1	0	1
18	Eritrea	0	1	0	1
18	Portugal	0	1	0	1
18	South Africa	0	1	0	1
22	Great Britain	0	0	3	3
23	Austria	0	0	2	2
23	Denmark	0	0	2	2
25	Canada	0	0	1	1
25	Finland	0	0	1	1
25	United States	0	0	1	1
Totals (27 entries)		29	29	30	88
