= Robin Donzé =

Swiss cyclist

Personal information
- Born: 6 November 2003 (age 22) Sierre, Switzerland

Cycling career
- Sport: Cycling
- Current team: Tudor Pro Cycling Team
- Discipline: Road
- Role: Rider
- Rider type: Climber

Amateur team
- 2021: AG2R Citroën U19 Team

Professional teams
- 2022: Tudor Pro Cycling Team
- 2023–2025: Tudor Pro Cycling Team U23
- 2026–: Tudor Pro Cycling Team

Robin Donzé (born 6 November 2003) is a Swiss cyclist, who currently rides for UCI ProTeam Tudor Pro Cycling Team.

== Major results ==
2021
National Junior Road Championships

3rd Road race
3rd Time trial

7th Overall Internationale Juniorenrundfahrt
2023
3rd Road race, National Under-23 Road Championships
2024
9th Overall Ronde de l'Isard
2025
2nd Road race, National Under-23 Road Championships
7th Coppa Città di San Daniele
8th Radsportfest Märwil
8th Road race, UCI Road World Under-23 Championships
