= Conor Murphy (cyclist) =

Irish cyclist (born 2007)

Personal information
- Born: 7 January 2007 (age 19)

Cycling career
- Sport: Cycling
- Current team: Decathlon–CMA CGM Development Team
- Disciplines: Road; Cyclo-cross
- Role: Rider

Amateur team
- 2025: Caldwell Cycles

Professional team
- 2026–: Decathlon–CMA CGM Development Team
Medal record
Representing Ireland
Men's road cycling
European Championships
Silver medal – second place	2025 Guilherand-Granges	Junior time trial

Conor Murphy (born 7 January 2007) is an Irish road racing cyclist who currently rides for UCI Continental Team Decathlon–CMA CGM Development Team

== Early life ==
From Clogherhead in County Louth, Murphy attended St Joseph's CBS in Drogheda. He was offered a sports scholarship at University College Dublin, but declined the offer to focus on cycling.

== Career ==
In 2022, Murphy was a winner on the U16 British Cyclocross National Trophy Series. Murphy was a silver medalist on the road at the 2023 European Youth Summer Olympic Festival in Slovenia, in the time trial. In October 2023, he won the elite race at the Leinster Cyclocross Series.

Murphy won the Eroica Juniores-Coppa Andrea Meneghelli; the junior Strade Bianche in 2024 at the age of 17 years-old, whilst riding for French team U19 Academy Région Sud powered by Giant.

Murphy was a silver medalist in the men's junior time trial at the 2025 European Road Championships in October 2025, finishing runner-up to the defending champion Michiel Mouris of the Netherlands. In 2025, he won the Irish road race and TT age-group titles and equalled Ryan Mullen's senior Irish record for the 10 mile time trial. After riding for Caldwell Cycles in 2025, he signed with Decathlon–AG2R La Mondiale Development Team for the 2026 season.
