= Marco Schrettl =

Austrian bicycle racer

- Schrettl in 2026

Personal information
- Born: 11 September 2003 (age 23) Münster, Austria
- Height: 1.81 m (5 ft 11 in)
- Weight: 63 kg (139 lb)

Cycling career
- Sport: Cycling
- Current team: XDS Astana Team
- Discipline: Road
- Role: Rider

Amateur team
- 2021: Team Auto Eder

Professional teams
- 2022: Trinity Racing
- 2023–2025: Tirol KTM Cycling Team
- 2026–: XDS Astana Team
Medal record
Men's cycling
Representing Austria
World Championships
Bronze medal – third place	2025 Kigali	Under-23 road race

Marco Schrettl (born 11 September 2003) is an Austrian professional racing cyclist, who currently rides for UCI WorldTeam XDS Astana Team. In 2025, he finished third at the Under-23 Road Race World Championships.

== Major results ==
2021
National Junior Road Championships

1st Road race
1st Time trial

1st Stage 2a (TTT) Aubel-Thimister-Stavelot
2nd Excellenze Valli del Soligo (TTT)
4th Overall Ain Bugey Valromey Tour
4th Grand Prix West Bohemia
6th Trofeo Guido Dorigo–Solighetto
8th Overall Course de la Paix Juniors
2023
2nd Gran Premio Industrie del Marmo
4th GP Vorarlberg
5th GP Capodarco
6th Gran Premio Palio del Recioto
6th GP Gorenjska
2024
1st Road race, National Under-23 Road Championships
3rd Radsaison-Eröffnungsrennen Leonding
5th GP Vorarlberg
6th GP Goriška & Vipava Valley
9th Trofeo Piva
10th Gran Premio Palio del Recioto
2025
1st Road race, National Under-23 Road Championships
1st Overall Orlen Nations Grand Prix
1st Trofeo Città di San Vendemiano
3rd Road race, UCI Road World Under-23 Championships
3rd Giro del Belvedere
3rd Gran Premio Palio del Recioto
3rd Radsaison-Eröffnungsrennen Leonding
7th Schwazer Radsporttage
2026
3rd Road race, National Road Championships
