= Giro Next Gen =

Italian U23 cycling stage race

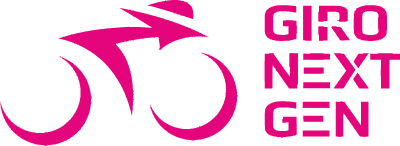

Race details
- Date: June
- Region: Italy
- Nickname: Baby Giro
- Discipline: Road
- Type: Stage race
- Organiser: RCS Sport
- Web site: www.gironextgen.it

History
- First edition: 1970
- Editions: 48 (as of 2025)
- First winner: Giancarlo Bellini (ITA)
- Most recent: Lorenzo Finn (ITA)

Giro Next Gen, also known as Baby Giro, Girobio, Giro d'Italia Giovani Under 23 or Giro Ciclistico d'Italia, is an Italian road bicycle racing amateur stage race created in 1970.

The race is considered to be the most important race on Italy's U23 calendar, the analogue of the Giro d'Italia. The list of winners includes renowned riders like Francesco Moser, Marco Pantani, Gilberto Simoni, Leonardo Piepoli and Danilo Di Luca.

After the 2012 edition, the race was not held for a few years, but it was announced that in 2017 it would return as a U23 race.

== Winners ==
Year	Country	Rider	Team
1970	Italy	Giancarlo Bellini	
1971	Italy	Francesco Moser	
1972	Italy	Giovanni Battaglin	
1973	Italy	Gianbattista Baronchelli	
1974	Italy	Leone Pizzini	
1975	Italy	Ruggero Gialdini	
1976	Italy	Francesco Conti	
1977	Italy	Claudio Corti	
1978	Italy	Fausto Stiz	
1979	Sweden	Alf Segersäll	
1980	Italy	Giovanni Fedrigo	
1981	Soviet Union	Sergey Voronin	
1982	Italy	Francesco Cesarini	
1983	Soviet Union	Vladimir Volochin	
1984	Soviet Union	Piotr Ugrumov	
1985	Soviet Union	Sergei Uslamin	
1986	Soviet Union	Alexandre Krasnov	
1987	No race		
1988	Soviet Union	Dmitri Konychev	
1989	Soviet Union	Andrei Teteriouk	
1990	Italy	Wladimir Belli	
1991	Italy	Francesco Casagrande	
1992	Italy	Marco Pantani	
1993	Italy	Gilberto Simoni	
1994	Italy	Leonardo Piepoli	
1995	Italy	Giuseppe Di Grande	
1996	Italy	Roberto Sgambelluri	
1997	Italy	Oscar Mason	
1998	Italy	Danilo Di Luca	
1999	Slovenia	Tadej Valjavec	
2000	Italy	Raffaele Ferrara	
2001	Italy	Davide Frattini	
2002	Italy	Giuseppe Muraglia	
2003	Lithuania	Dainius Kairelis	Modal Faresin
2004	Italy	Marco Marzano	VC Ceramiche Pagnoncelli
2005	No race		
2006	Italy	Dario Cataldo	Bedogni Natalini Praga
2007– 2008	No race		
2009	Colombia	Cayetano Sarmiento	Colombia
2010	Colombia	Carlos Betancur	Colombia
2011	Italy	Mattia Cattaneo	U.C. Trevigiani–Dynamon–Bottoli
2012	United States	Joe Dombrowski	United States
2013– 2016	No race		
2017	Russia	Pavel Sivakov	BMC Development Team
2018	Russia	Aleksandr Vlasov	Gazprom–RusVelo
2019	Colombia	Andrés Ardila	EPM
2020	Great Britain	Tom Pidcock	Trinity Racing
2021	Spain	Juan Ayuso	Team Colpack–Ballan
2022	Great Britain	Leo Hayter	Hagens Berman Axeon
2023	Norway	Johannes Staune-Mittet	Jumbo–Visma Development Team
2024	Belgium	Jarno Widar	Lotto–Dstny Development Team
2025	Slovenia	Jakob Omrzel	Bahrain Victorious Development Team
2026	Italy	Lorenzo Finn	Red Bull–Bora–Hansgrohe Rookies
