= Matevž Govekar =

Slovenian cyclist

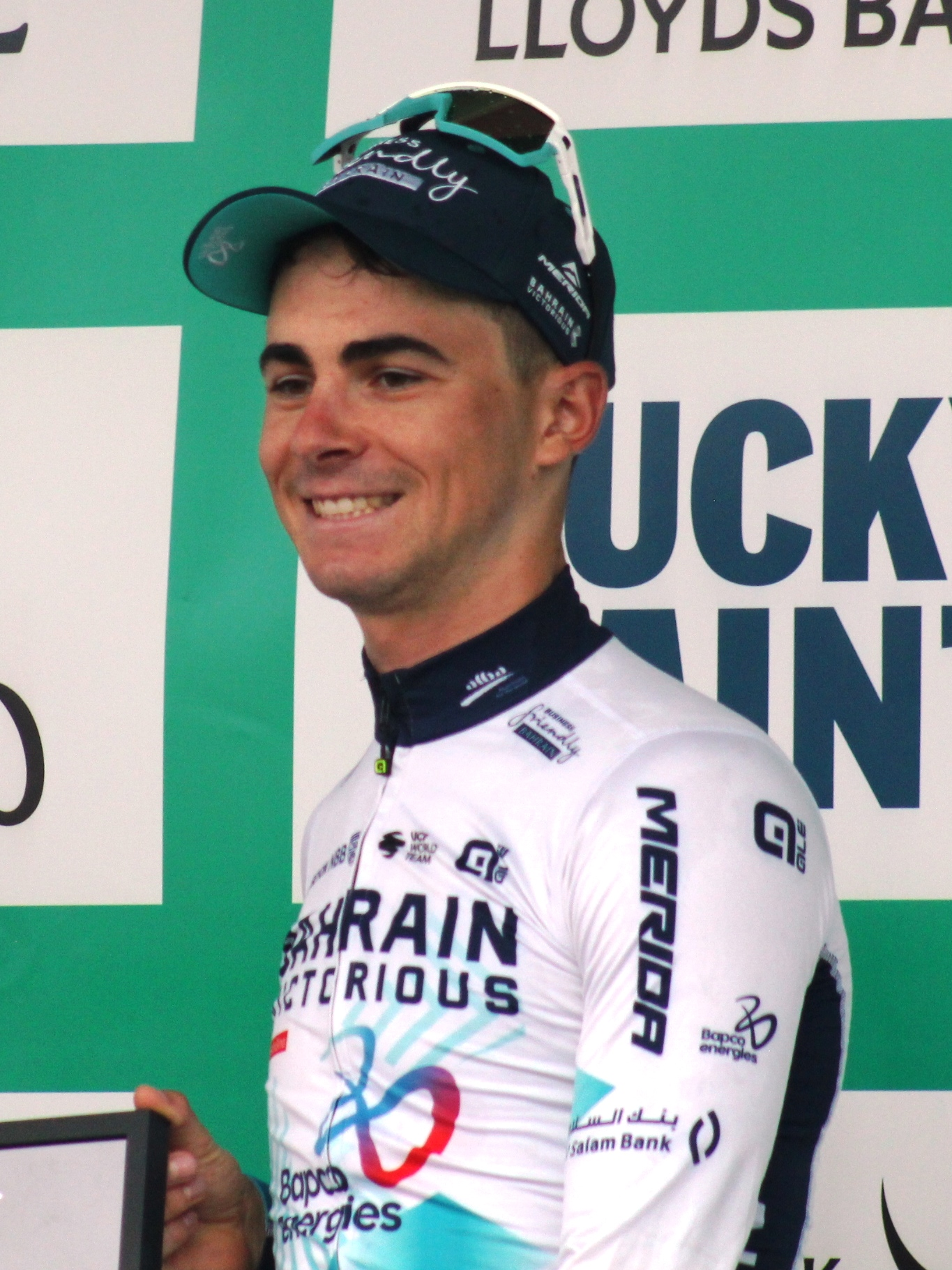
- Matevž Govekar in 2024

Personal information
- Born: 17 April 2000 (age 26) Ljubljana, Slovenia
- Height: 1.80 m (5 ft 11 in)
- Weight: 73 kg (161 lb)

Cycling career
- Sport: Cycling
- Current team: Team Bahrain Victorious
- Disciplines: Road; Gravel
- Role: Rider
- Rider type: All-rounder

Amateur team
- 2019–2020: MebloJOGI Pro-Concrete

Professional teams
- 2021–2022: Tirol KTM Cycling Team
- 2022–: Team Bahrain Victorious

Matevž Govekar (born 17 April 2000) is a Slovenian racing cyclist, who currently rides for UCI WorldTeam Team Bahrain Victorious.

== Major results ==
=== Road ===
2018
8th G.P. Eccellenze Valli del Soligo
2021
1st Mountains classification, In the footsteps of the Romans
5th Trofeo Matteotti
5th Gran Premio Sportivi di Poggiana
2022 (1 pro win)
1st Stage 4 Vuelta a Burgos
1st Prologue Istrian Spring Trophy
National Championships

2nd Road race
4th Time trial

2nd Poreč Trophy
5th GP Slovenian Istria
9th Road race, UCI World Under-23 Championships
2023
4th Road race, National Championships
2024 (3)
1st Stage 6 Tour of Guangxi
1st Stage 6 Tour of Britain
1st Stage 2 Tour of Antalya
2025
3rd Road race, National Championships
6th Gran Premio Castellón
2026
4th Kuurne–Brussels–Kuurne
7th Le Samyn

==== Grand Tour general classification results timeline ====
| Grand Tour | 2023 |
|---|---|
| Giro d'Italia | — |
| Tour de France | — |
| Vuelta a España | 133 |

Legend
| — | Did not compete |
| DNF | Did not finish |

=== Gravel ===
2025
UCI World Series

1st Girona
