= Romet Pajur =

Estonian cyclist

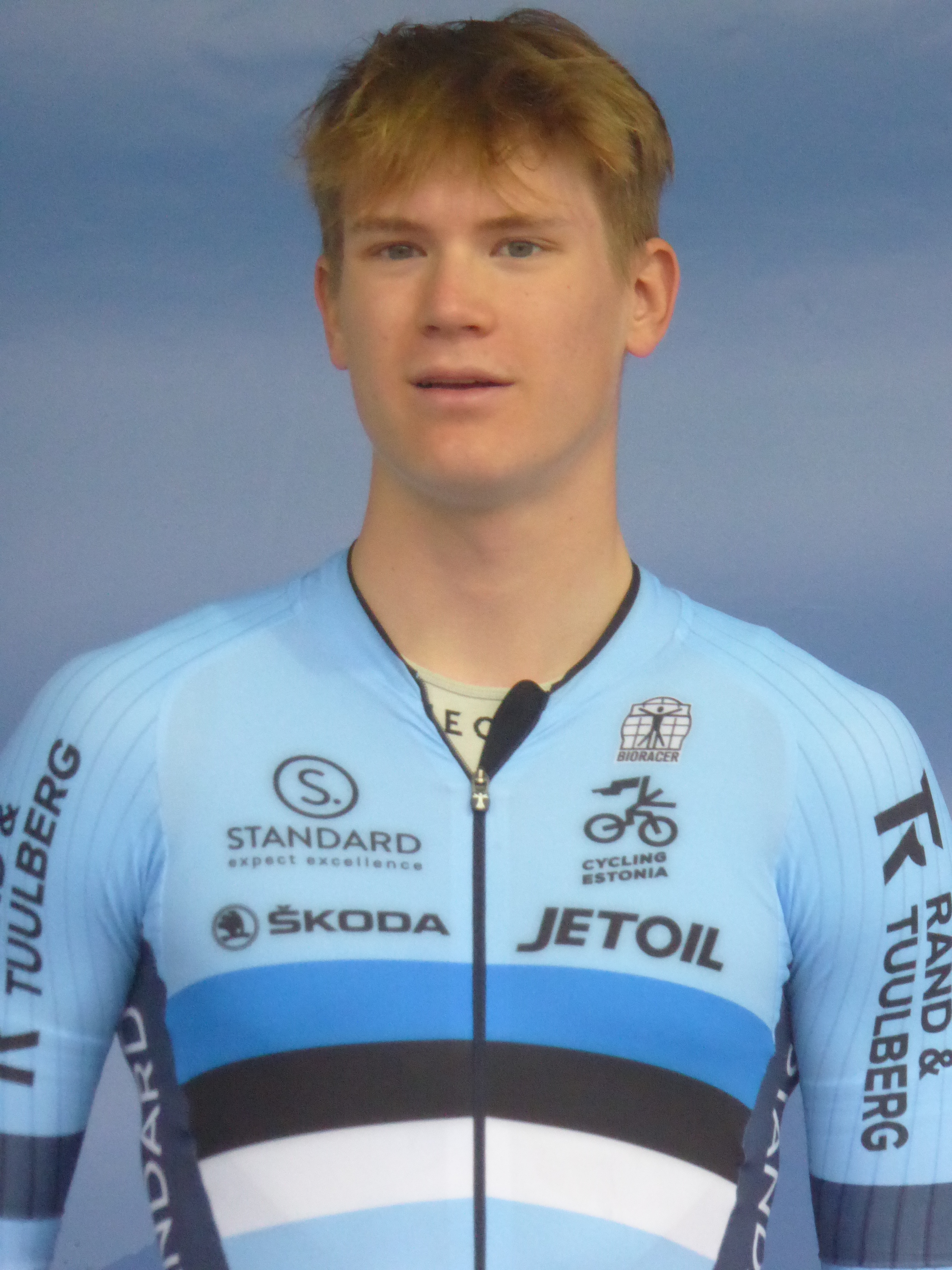
- Pajur in 2023

Personal information
- Born: 26 September 2004 (age 22) Tallinn, Estonia
- Height: 1.85 m (6 ft 1 in)
- Weight: 78 kg (172 lb)

Cycling career
- Sport: Cycling
- Current team: Red Bull–Bora–Hansgrohe Rookies
- Discipline: Road
- Role: Rider

Amateur team
- 2022: Team Auto Eder

Professional teams
- 2023–2024: Team Lotto–Kern Haus
- 2025–: Red Bull–Bora–Hansgrohe Rookies

Major wins
- Single-day races and Classics National Road Race Championships (2026)

Romet Pajur (born 26 September 2005) is an Estonian cyclist, who currently rides for UCI Continental team Red Bull–Bora–Hansgrohe Rookies.

== Major results ==
2021
1st Stage 4 Course de la Paix Juniors
National Junior Road Championships

2nd Time trial
3rd Road race

10th Overall One Belt One Road Nation's Cup Hungary
2022
National Junior Road Championships

1st Road race
2nd Time trial

1st Ronde van Vlaanderen Juniores
1st Trofeo Comune di Vertova
1st Stage 2b Course de la Paix Juniors
1st Stage 2a Grand Prix Rüebliland
2nd Paris–Roubaix Juniors
2nd Trofeo Emilio Paganessi
2nd Grand Prix West Bohemia
5th Time trial, UCI Road World Junior Championships
6th Road race, European Junior Road Championships
2023
4th Road race, National Under-23 Road Championships
2025
8th Overall Tour of Estonia
2026 (2 pro wins)
National Road Championships

1st Road race
4th Time trial

2nd Overall Tour of Estonia

1st Points classification
1st Young rider classification
1st Prologue

2nd Road race, National Under-23 Road Championships
