= Jan Huber =

Swiss cyclist (born 2005)

- Huber in 2026

Personal information
- Born: 28 May 2005 (age 21) Sulz, Aargau, Switzerland
- Height: 1.79 m (5 ft 10 in)
- Weight: 63 kg (139 lb)

Cycling career
- Sport: Cycling
- Current team: Tudor Pro Cycling Team U23
- Discipline: Road
- Role: Rider

Amateur teams
- 2024: Bauer Sport Cycling Team
- 2025: RE/MAX RacingTeam

Professional team
- 2026–: Tudor Pro Cycling Team U23
Medal record
Men's road cycling
Representing Switzerland
World Championships
Silver medal – second place	2025 Kigali	Under-23 road race

Jan Huber (born 28 May 2005) is a Swiss cyclist who rides for UCI Continental team Tudor Pro Cycling Team U23. In 2025, he finished second at the Under-23 Road Race World Championships.

== Major results ==
2023
3rd Gippinger Radsporttage
2024
4th GP Oberbaselbiet
2025
1st GP Filona
1st GP Oberbaselbiet
2nd Road race, UCI Road World Under-23 Championships
National Under-23 Championships

3rd Road race
3rd Time trial

5th Tour de Berne
6th GP Berra Immobilier – Mémorial Jean Luisier
