= Oscar Mason =

Oscar Mason may refer to:

- Oscar Mason (cyclist) (born 1975), Italian cyclist
- Oscar G. Mason (c. 1830–1921), American photographer
