= Decathlon CMA CGM Development Team =

French road cycling team

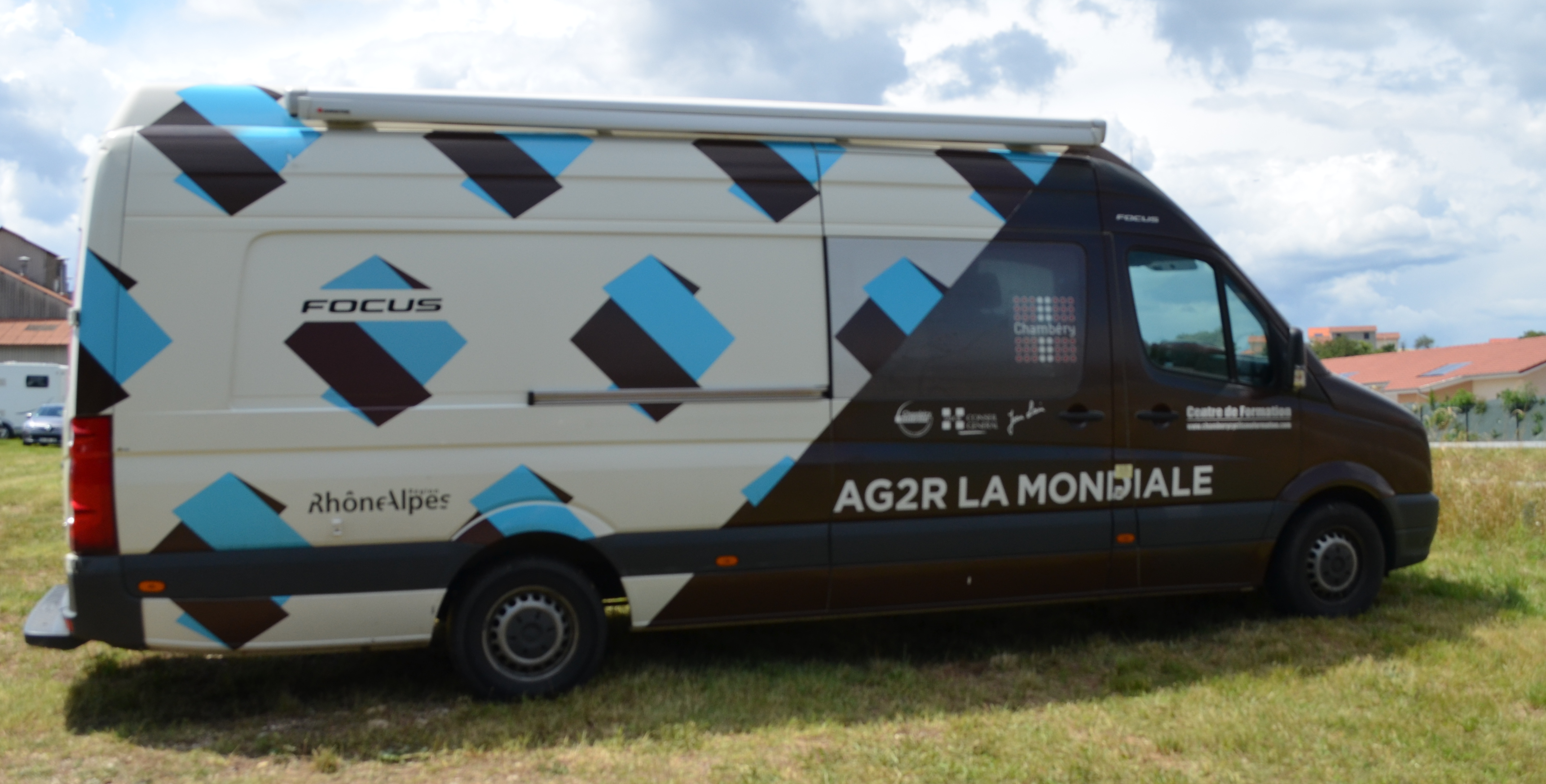
- A team vehicle in 2016

Team information
- UCI code: DCD
- Registered: France
- Founded: 2001; 25 years ago
- Discipline: Road
- Status: DN1 (2004–2023); UCI Continental (2024–)
- Bicycles: Van Rysel
- Components: DRAM

Key personnel
- Team managers: Kevin Fouache; David Giraud

Team name history
- 2001–2020 2021–2023 2024–: Chambéry Cyclisme Formation; AG2R Citroën U23 Team; Decathlon–AG2R La Mondiale Development Team

The Decathlon CMA CGM Development Team is a French UCI Continental road cycling team established in 2001. Until 2023, it was a national first-division (DN1) club team, upgrading to UCI Continental status for the 2024 season. The team acts as the development program for UCI WorldTeam Decathlon CMA CGM Team. Notable riders to have ridden for the team include Romain Bardet, Julien Bérard, Benoît Cosnefroy, Maxime Bouet, Victor Lafay and Pierre Latour among others.

== Team roster ==
As of 17 August 2026.

Rider	Date of birth
Rémi Arsac (FRA)	21 January 2005 (age 21)
Louic Boussemaere (BEL)	26 August 2006 (age 20)
Alexis Bouteloup (FRA)	17 January 2007 (age 19)
Louis Chaleil (FRA)	21 February 2006 (age 20)
Marius Innhaug Dahl (NOR)	19 May 2006 (age 20)
Kasper Haugland (NOR)	27 March 2005 (age 21)
Valentin Martinet (FRA)	17 September 2007 (age 18)

Rider	Date of birth
Conor Murphy (IRE)	7 January 2007 (age 19)
Nate Pringle (NZL)	16 October 2003 (age 22)
Braden Reitz (USA)	26 February 2007 (age 19)
Aubin Sparfel (FRA)	3 May 2006 (age 20)
Liam Van Bylen (BEL)	27 February 2005 (age 21)
Théophile Vassal (FRA)	10 January 2007 (age 19)

== Major wins ==
2007
Ronde van Vlaanderen U23, Alexandre Pliușchin
Stage 1 Tour Alsace, Paul Moucheraud
2008
Overall Ronde de l'Isard, Guillaume Bonnafond

Stage 4, Guillaume Bonnafond

2009
Stage 5 Ronde de l'Isard, Julien Bérard
Overall Tour des Pays de Savoie, Ben Gastauer

Stage 1, Ben Gastauer

Switzerland National Under-23 Time Trial Championships, Nicolas Schnyder
2010
Stage 4 Ronde de l'Isard, Romain Bardet
Switzerland National Under-23 Time Trial Championships, Silvan Dillier
2011
Stages 2 & 3 Tour des Pays de Savoie, Romain Bardet
2013
Stage 4 Tour des Pays de Savoie, Clément Chevrier
2016
Stage 2 Ronde de l'Isard, Rémy Rochas
2019
Luxembourg National Under-23 Road Race Championships, Ken Conter
Overall Giro della Friuli Venezia Giulia, Clément Champoussin

Stage 4, Clément Champoussin

2021
Trofeo Città di San Vendemiano, Paul Lapeira
France National Under-23 Road Race Championships, Valentin Retailleau
Stage 1 Tour de Bretagne, Valentin Retailleau
Piccolo Giro di Lombardia, Paul Lapeira
2022
Stage 4 Alpes Isère Tour, Valentin Retailleau
Stage 3 Kreiz Breizh Elites, Jordan Labrosse
Ruota d'Oro, Jordan Labrosse
2024
Overall Istrian Spring Trophy, Noa Isidore

Stage 2, Noa Isidore

Stages 4 & 5 Olympia's Tour, Rasmus Søjberg Pedersen
Stage 4 Tour de Bretagne, Baptiste Veistroffer
France National Under-23 Road Race Championships, Noa Isidore
Stage 2 Alpes Isère Tour, Killian Verschuren
Denmark National Road Race Championships, Rasmus Søjberg Pedersen
Overall Tour d'Eure-et-Loir, Antoine L'Hote

Stage 1, Antoine L'Hote

Paris–Tours Espoirs, Antoine L'Hote
2025
Overall Olympia's Tour, Antoine L'Hote

Stage 5, Antoine L'Hote

Overall Alpes Isère Tour, Aubin Sparfel

Stage 5, Aubin Sparfel
