= Flèche Ardennaise =

Belgian one-day road cycling race

Race details
- Date: May/June
- Region: Liège, Belgium
- English name: Flèche Ardennaise
- Discipline: Road race
- Competition: UCI Europe Tour
- Type: Single-day
- Web site: fleche-ardennaise.be

History
- First edition: 1966
- Editions: 61 (as of 2026)
- First winner: Willy Van Neste (BEL)
- Most wins: Ruslan Gryschenko (UKR) (2 wins)
- Most recent: Jack Ward (AUS)

The Flèche Ardennaise is a single-day road bicycle race held annually in June in the province of Liège, Belgium. Since 2010, the race is organized as a 1.2 event on the UCI Europe Tour.

== Winners ==
Year	Country	Rider	Team
1966	Belgium	Willy Van Neste	
1967	Belgium	Valère Van Sweevelt	
1968	Belgium	Roger De Vlaeminck	
1969	Belgium	Joseph Bruyère	
1970	Belgium	Theo Dockx	
1971	Belgium	Luc Van Goidsenhoven	
1972	Belgium	Gustaaf Hermans	
1973	Belgium	Lieven Malfait	
1974	Belgium	Joseph Gysemans	
1975	Belgium	Jean-Luc Vandenbroucke	
1976	Belgium	Wim Mynheer	
1977	Belgium	René Martens	
1978	Belgium	Ronny Claes	
1979	Belgium	Daniel Plummer	
1980	Belgium	Jan Nevens	
1981	Belgium	Danny Schoonbaert	
1982	Belgium	Eric Vanderaerden	
1983	Belgium	Franky Van Oyen	
1984	Belgium	Dirk Ghyselinck	
1985	Belgium	Luc Ronsse	
1986	Belgium	Greg Moens	
1987	Belgium	Benny Heylen	
1988	Belgium	Johan Pauwels	
1989	Netherlands	Eddy Bouwmans	
1990	Belgium	Bart Leysen	Lotto–Superclub
1991	France	Stéphane Galbois	
1992	Belgium	Nico Desmet	
1993	Netherlands	Casper van der Meer	
1994	Belgium	Steven Van Aken	
1995	Belgium	Tony Bracke	
1996	France	Benoît Salmon	Collstrop
1997	Germany	Christian Henn	Team Telekom
1998	Belgium	Erwin Thijs	Vlaanderen 2002–Eddy Merckx
1999	France	Pierrick Fédrigo	
2000	France	Thomas Voeckler	Bonjour
2001	Ukraine	Ruslan Gryschenko	Landbouwkrediet–Colnago
2002	Ukraine	Ruslan Gryschenko	Landbouwkrediet–Colnago
2003	Finland	Jukka Vastaranta	Rabobank GS3
2004	New Zealand	Jeremy Yates	Crédit Agricole
2005	Belgium	Francis De Greef	Bodysol–Win for Life–Jong Vlaanderen
2006	Belgium	Gil Suray	Unibet.com
2007	Belgium	Sébastien Delfosse	Pôle Continental Wallon–Bodysol–Euromillions
2008	Belgium	Jan Bakelants	Beveren 2000
2009	Belgium	Sander Armée	Beveren 2000
2010	Belgium	Thomas Degand	Verandas Willems
2011	Belgium	Zico Waeytens	Omega Pharma–Lotto Davo
2012	France	Clément Lhotellerie	Colba–Superano Ham
2013	Switzerland	Silvan Dillier	BMC Development Team
2014	Switzerland	Stefan Küng	BMC Development Team
2015	Belgium	Loïc Vliegen	BMC Development Team
2016	Netherlands	Jeroen Meijers	Rabobank Development Team
2017	Belgium	Harm Vanhoucke	Lotto–Soudal U23
2018	Netherlands	Cees Bol	Team Sunweb
2019	Switzerland	Simon Pellaud	IAM–Excelsior
2020– 2021	No race due to the COVID-19 pandemic in Belgium		
2022	France	Romain Grégoire	Équipe Continentale Groupama–FDJ
2023	Netherlands	Menno Huising	Jumbo–Visma Development Team
2024	Belgium	Milan Donie	Lotto–Dstny Development Team
2025	Belgium	Jarno Widar	Lotto Development Team
2026	Australia	Jack Ward	Lidl–Trek Future Racing
