= Orlen Nations Grand Prix =

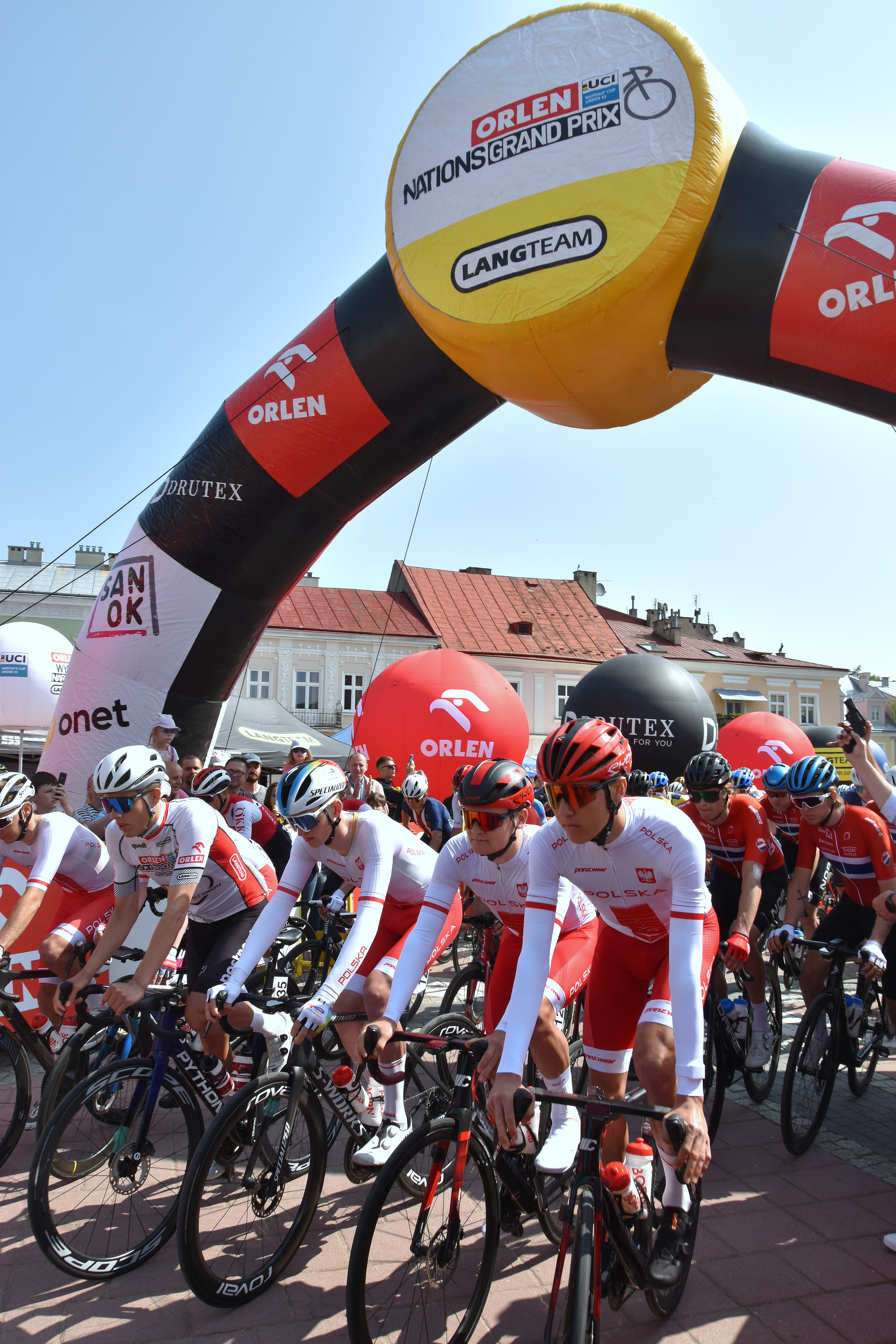
- Orlen Nations Grand Prix in Sanok (2023)

Race details
- Date: June (2019)/September (2020)
- Region: Poland
- Discipline: Road race
- Competition: UCI Under 23 Nations' Cup; UCI Europe Tour
- Type: Stage race
- Web site: orlenwyscignarodow.com

History
- First edition: 2019
- Editions: 7 (as of 2025)
- First winner: Nicolas Prodhomme (FRA)
- Most wins: No repeat winners
- Most recent: Marco Schrettl (AUT)

The Orlen Nations Grand Prix is a multi-day road cycling race held annually in Poland. It is part of the UCI Under 23 Nations' Cup, and is therefore reserved to under-23 cyclists.

== Winners ==
Year	Country	Rider	Team
2019	France	Nicolas Prodhomme	France (national team)
2020	Netherlands	Olav Kooij	Netherlands (national team)
2021	Netherlands	Marijn van den Berg	Netherlands (national team)
2022	Denmark	Morten Nørtoft	Denmark (national team)
2023	Slovenia	Gal Glivar	Slovenia (national team)
2024	France	Mathys Rondel	France (national team)
2025	Austria	Marco Schrettl	Austria (national team)
