= Red Bull–Bora–Hansgrohe Rookies =

German cycling team

Team information
- Registered: Germany (2025–)
- Founded: 2025
- Discipline: Road
- Status: UCI Continental (2025–)
- Bicycles: Specialized
- Website: Team home page

Key personnel
- General manager: Gregor Gazvoda
- Team managers: Cesare Benedetti; Pello Olaberria

Team name history
- 2025–: Red Bull–Bora–Hansgrohe Rookies

Red Bull–Bora–Hansgrohe Rookies is a UCI Continental road bicycle racing team based in Germany founded in 2025. It serves as a development team for the UCI WorldTeam Red Bull–Bora–Hansgrohe.

== Team roster ==
As of 12 August 2026

Rider	Date of birth
Gustave Blanc (FRA)	27 March 2007 (age 19)
Max Bock (GER)	10 March 2005 (age 21)
Theodor August Clemmensen (DEN)	24 August 2006 (age 20)
Davide Donati (ITA)	8 April 2005 (age 21)
Paul Fietzke (GER)	23 January 2006 (age 20)
Lorenzo Finn (ITA)	19 December 2006 (age 19)
Anatol Friedl (AUT)	14 April 2007 (age 19)

Rider	Date of birth
Alessio Magagnotti (ITA)	27 January 2007 (age 19)
Michiel Mouris (NED)	7 February 2007 (age 19)
Noah Lindholm Møller Andersen (DEN)	27 January 2007 (age 19)
Romet Pajur (EST)	26 September 2004 (age 21)
Sebastian Putz (AUT)	26 August 2003 (age 23)
Gijs Schoonvelde (NED)	29 January 2007 (age 19)

== Major results ==
2025
Overall Istrian Spring Trophy, Adrien Boichis
Giro del Belvedere, Lorenzo Finn
United Kingdom National Under-23 Time Trial, Callum Thornley
Italy National Under-23 Time Trial, Davide Donati
New Zealand National Under-23 Time Trial, Nate Pringle

== National champions ==
2025
British Under-23 Time Trial, Callum Thornley
Italian Under-23 Time Trial, Davide Donati
