= 2024 Tour of Taihu Lake =

2024 UCI ProSeries

Race details
- Dates: 9–13 October 2024
- Stages: 5
- Distance: 529.49 km (329.0 mi)
- Winning time: 10h 52' 22"

Results
Jersey awarded to the overall winner	Winner	Jelte Krijnsen (NED)	(Parkhotel Valkenburg)
	Second	Marcin Budziński (POL)	(Mazowsze Serce Polski)
	Third	Wilmar Paredes (COL)	(Team Medellín–EPM)
Jersey awarded to the points classification winner	Points	Martin Laas (EST)	(Ferei Quick-Panda Podium Mongolia Team)
Jersey awarded to the youth classification winner	Youth	Jelte Krijnsen (NED)	(Parkhotel Valkenburg)
	Team	(France) Team TotalEnergies	

The 2024 Tour of Taihu Lake was a men's road cycling stage race which took place from 9 to 13 October 2024. It was the 12th edition of the Tour of Taihu Lake, which was rated as a 2.Pro event on the 2024 UCI ProSeries calendar.

== Teams ==
Six UCI ProTeams and sixteen UCI Continental teams made up the twenty-two teams in the race.

UCI ProTeams

- Burgos BH
- Caja Rural–Seguros RGA
- Team Corratec–Vini Fantini
- Lotto–Dstny
- Team TotalEnergies
- Team Novo Nordisk

UCI Continental Teams

- Bodywrap Men's Cycling Team
- China Glory–Mentech Continental Cycling Team
- CCACHE x Par Küp
- Hengxiang Cycling Team
- Huansheng–SCOM–Taishan Sport Cycling Team
- Ljubljana Gusto Santic
- Li-Ning Star
- Team Medellín–EPM
- Mazowsze Serce Polski
- Giant Cycling Team
- Parkhotel Valkenburg
- Pingtan International Tourism Island Cycling Team
- Ferei Quick-Panda Podium Mongolia Team
- Roojai Insurance
- St George Continental Cycling Team
- Van Rysel–Roubaix

== Schedule ==
Stage characteristics and winners
Stage	Date	Route	Distance	Type	Stage winner
1	9 October	Wuxi to Wuxi	103 km (64 mi)	Flat stage	Martin Laas (EST)
2	10 October	Qidong to Qidong	78.6 km (48.8 mi)	Flat stage	Steffen De Schuyteneer (BEL)
3	11 October	Wujiang to Wujiang	116.8 km (72.6 mi)	Flat stage	Martin Laas (EST)
4	12 October	Huzhou to Changxing	117 km (73 mi)	Flat stage	Jason Tesson (FRA)
5	13 October	Nanjing to Nanjing	114.09 km (70.89 mi)	Flat stage	Jelte Krijnsen (NED)
Total			529.49 km (329.01 mi)		

== Stages ==
=== Stage 1 ===
9 October 2024 – Wuxi to Wuxi, 103 km (64 mi)

Stage 1 Result
Rank	Rider	Team	Time
1	Martin Laas (EST)	Ferei Quick-Panda Podium Mongolia Team	2h 04' 27"
2	Wang Kuicheng (CHN)	Bodywrap Men's Cycling Team	+ 0"
3	Tobiasz Pawlak (POL)	Mazowsze Serce Polski	+ 0"
4	Jesper Rasch (NED)	Parkhotel Valkenburg	+ 0"
5	Karl Patrick Lauk (EST)	Huansheng–SCOM–Taishan Sport Cycling Team	+ 0"
6	Jason Tesson (FRA)	Team TotalEnergies	+ 0"
7	Emmanuel Morin (FRA)	Van Rysel–Roubaix	+ 0"
8	Jan Stockli (SUI)	Team Corratec–Vini Fantini	+ 0"
9	Reinardt Janse van Rensburg (RSA)	China Glory–Mentech Continental Cycling Team	+ 0"
10	Siarhei Shauchenka	Huansheng–SCOM–Taishan Sport Cycling Team	+ 0"

General classification after Stage 1
Rank	Rider	Team	Time
1	Martin Laas (EST)	Ferei Quick-Panda Podium Mongolia Team	2h 04' 17"
2	Wang Kuicheng (CHN)	Bodywrap Men's Cycling Team	+ 4"
3	Tobiasz Pawlak (POL)	Mazowsze Serce Polski	+ 4"
4	Jesper Rasch (NED)	Parkhotel Valkenburg	+ 7"
5	Joshua Giddings (GBR)	Lotto–Dstny	+ 7"
6	Norbert Banaszek (POL)	Mazowsze Serce Polski	+ 8"
7	Lorrenzo Manzin (FRA)	Team TotalEnergies	+ 9"
8	Steffen De Schuyteneer (BEL)	Lotto–Dstny	+ 9"
9	Karl Patrick Lauk (EST)	Huansheng–SCOM–Taishan Sport Cycling Team	+ 10"
10	Jason Tesson (FRA)	Team TotalEnergies	+ 10"

=== Stage 2 ===
10 October 2024 – Qidong to Qidong, 78.6 km (48.8 mi)

Stage 2 Result
Rank	Rider	Team	Time
1	Steffen De Schuyteneer (BEL)	Lotto–Dstny	1h 38' 39"
2	Rait Ärm (EST)	Van Rysel–Roubaix	+ 0"
3	Martin Laas (EST)	Ferei Quick-Panda Podium Mongolia Team	+ 0"
4	Anton Popov	Pingtan International Tourism Island Cycling Team	+ 0"
5	Reinardt Janse van Rensburg (RSA)	China Glory–Mentech Continental Cycling Team	+ 0"
6	Norbert Banaszek (POL)	Mazowsze Serce Polski	+ 0"
7	Francesc Bennassar (ESP)	Burgos BH	+ 0"
8	Georgios Bouglas (GRE)	Burgos BH	+ 0"
9	Milan Menten (BEL)	Lotto–Dstny	+ 0"
10	Jesper Rasch (NED)	Parkhotel Valkenburg	+ 0"

General classification after Stage 2
Rank	Rider	Team	Time
1	Martin Laas (EST)	Ferei Quick-Panda Podium Mongolia Team	3h 42' 52"
2	Steffen De Schuyteneer (BEL)	Lotto–Dstny	+ 3"
3	Rait Ärm (EST)	Van Rysel–Roubaix	+ 8"
4	Tobiasz Pawlak (POL)	Mazowsze Serce Polski	+ 8"
5	Wang Kuicheng (CHN)	Bodywrap Men's Cycling Team	+ 8"
6	Jesper Rasch (NED)	Parkhotel Valkenburg	+ 11"
7	Joshua Giddings (GBR)	Lotto–Dstny	+ 11"
8	Óscar Sevilla (ESP)	Team Medellín–EPM	+ 11"
9	Māris Bogdanovičs (LAT)	Hengxiang Cycling Team	+ 12"
10	Norbert Banaszek (POL)	Mazowsze Serce Polski	+ 12"

=== Stage 3 ===
11 October 2024 – Wujiang to Wujiang, 116.8 km (72.6 mi)

Stage 3 Result
Rank	Rider	Team	Time
1	Martin Laas (EST)	Ferei Quick-Panda Podium Mongolia Team	2h 16' 21"
2	Daniel Babor (CZE)	Caja Rural–Seguros RGA	+ 0"
3	Jakub Mareczko (ITA)	Team Corratec–Vini Fantini	+ 0"
4	Karl Patrick Lauk (EST)	Huansheng–SCOM–Taishan Sport Cycling Team	+ 0"
5	Jason Tesson (FRA)	Team TotalEnergies	+ 0"
6	Geoffrey Soupe (FRA)	Team TotalEnergies	+ 0"
7	Rait Ärm (EST)	Van Rysel–Roubaix	+ 0"
8	Lucas Carstensen (GER)	Roojai Insurance	+ 0"
9	Jesper Rasch (NED)	Parkhotel Valkenburg	+ 0"
10	Francesc Bennassar (ESP)	Burgos BH	+ 0"

General classification after Stage 3
Rank	Rider	Team	Time
1	Martin Laas (EST)	Ferei Quick-Panda Podium Mongolia Team	5h 59' 03"
2	Steffen De Schuyteneer (BEL)	Lotto–Dstny	+ 9"
3	Rait Ärm (EST)	Van Rysel–Roubaix	+ 17"
4	Tobiasz Pawlak (POL)	Mazowsze Serce Polski	+ 18"
5	Daniel Babor (CZE)	Caja Rural–Seguros RGA	+ 18"
6	Wang Kuicheng (CHN)	Bodywrap Men's Cycling Team	+ 18"
7	Joshua Giddings (GBR)	Lotto–Dstny	+ 19"
8	Reinardt Janse van Rensburg (RSA)	China Glory–Mentech Continental Cycling Team	+ 20"
9	Jakub Mareczko (ITA)	Team Corratec–Vini Fantini	+ 20"
10	Milan Menten (BEL)	Lotto–Dstny	+ 20"

=== Stage 4 ===
12 October 2024 – Huzhou to Changxing, 117 km (73 mi)

Stage 4 Result
Rank	Rider	Team	Time
1	Jason Tesson (FRA)	Team TotalEnergies	2h 19' 53"
2	Graeme Frislie (AUS)	CCACHE x Par Küp	+ 0"
3	Reinardt Janse van Rensburg (RSA)	China Glory–Mentech Continental Cycling Team	+ 0"
4	Martin Laas (EST)	Ferei Quick-Panda Podium Mongolia Team	+ 0"
5	Steffen De Schuyteneer (BEL)	Lotto–Dstny	+ 0"
6	Tobiasz Pawlak (POL)	Mazowsze Serce Polski	+ 0"
7	Joshua Giddings (GBR)	Lotto–Dstny	+ 0"
8	Anton Popov	Pingtan International Tourism Island Cycling Team	+ 0"
9	Rait Ärm (EST)	Van Rysel–Roubaix	+ 0"
10	Francesc Bennassar (ESP)	Burgos BH	+ 0"

General classification after Stage 4
Rank	Rider	Team	Time
1	Martin Laas (EST)	Ferei Quick-Panda Podium Mongolia Team	8h 18' 56"
2	Steffen De Schuyteneer (BEL)	Lotto–Dstny	+ 9"
3	Jason Tesson (FRA)	Team TotalEnergies	+ 14"
4	Reinardt Janse van Rensburg (RSA)	China Glory–Mentech Continental Cycling Team	+ 15"
5	Tobiasz Pawlak (POL)	Mazowsze Serce Polski	+ 16"
6	Milan Menten (BEL)	Lotto–Dstny	+ 16"
7	Daniel Babor (CZE)	Caja Rural–Seguros RGA	+ 18"
8	Wang Kuicheng (CHN)	Bodywrap Men's Cycling Team	+ 18"
9	Graeme Frislie (AUS)	CCACHE x Par Küp	+ 18"
10	Joshua Giddings (GBR)	Lotto–Dstny	+ 19"

=== Stage 5 ===
13 October 2024 – Nanjing to Nanjing, 114.09 km (70.89 mi)

Stage 5 Result
Rank	Rider	Team	Time
1	Jelte Krijnsen (NED)	Parkhotel Valkenburg	2h 33' 17"
2	Marcin Budziński (POL)	Mazowsze Serce Polski	+ 0"
3	Karl Patrick Lauk (EST)	Huansheng–SCOM–Taishan Sport Cycling Team	+ 0"
4	Wilmar Paredes (COL)	Team Medellín–EPM	+ 0"
5	Gorka Sorrarain (ESP)	Caja Rural–Seguros RGA	+ 0"
6	Cristian Raileanu (ROM)	Li-Ning Star	+ 0"
7	Célestin Guillon (FRA)	Van Rysel–Roubaix	+ 0"
8	Ander Okamika (ESP)	Burgos BH	+ 0"
9	Logan Currie (NZL)	Lotto–Dstny	+ 0"
10	Dylan Hopkins (AUS)	Ljubljana Gusto Santic	+ 0"

General classification after Stage 5
Rank	Rider	Team	Time
1	Jelte Krijnsen (NED)	Parkhotel Valkenburg	10h 52' 22"
2	Marcin Budziński (POL)	Mazowsze Serce Polski	+ 8"
3	Wilmar Paredes (COL)	Team Medellín–EPM	+ 10"
4	Karl Patrick Lauk (EST)	Huansheng–SCOM–Taishan Sport Cycling Team	+ 11"
5	Gorka Sorrarain (ESP)	Caja Rural–Seguros RGA	+ 12"
6	Martin Laas (EST)	Ferei Quick-Panda Podium Mongolia Team	+ 14"
7	Paul Ourselin (FRA)	Team TotalEnergies	+ 14"
8	Dylan Hopkins (AUS)	Ljubljana Gusto Santic	+ 15"
9	Cristian Raileanu (ROM)	Li-Ning Star	+ 15"
10	Logan Currie (NZL)	Lotto–Dstny	+ 15"

== Classification leadership table ==
Classification leadership by stage
Stage	Winner	General classification	Points classification	Young rider classification	Team classification
1	Martin Laas	Martin Laas	Martin Laas	Joshua Giddings	Team Corratec–Vini Fantini
2	Steffen De Schuyteneer	Martin Laas	Martin Laas	Steffen De Schuyteneer	Mazowsze Serce Polski
3	Martin Laas	Martin Laas	Martin Laas	Steffen De Schuyteneer	Team Corratec–Vini Fantini
4	Jason Tesson	Martin Laas	Martin Laas	Steffen De Schuyteneer	Team Corratec–Vini Fantini
5	Jelte Krijnsen	Jelte Krijnsen	Martin Laas	Jelte Krijnsen	Team TotalEnergies
Final		Jelte Krijnsen	Martin Laas	Jelte Krijnsen	Team TotalEnergies

== Classification standings ==
Legend
Denotes the winner of the general classification	Denotes the winner of the young rider classification
Denotes the winner of the points classification	

=== General classification ===
Final general classification (1–10)
Rank	Rider	Team	Time
1	Jelte Krijnsen (NED)	Parkhotel Valkenburg	10h 52' 22"
2	Marcin Budziński (POL)	Mazowsze Serce Polski	+ 8"
3	Wilmar Paredes (COL)	Team Medellín–EPM	+ 10"
4	Karl Patrick Lauk (EST)	Huansheng–SCOM–Taishan Sport Cycling Team	+ 11"
5	Gorka Sorrarain (ESP)	Caja Rural–Seguros RGA	+ 12"
6	Martin Laas (EST)	Ferei Quick-Panda Podium Mongolia Team	+ 14"
7	Paul Ourselin (FRA)	Team TotalEnergies	+ 14"
8	Dylan Hopkins (AUS)	Ljubljana Gusto Santic	+ 15"
9	Cristian Raileanu (ROM)	Li-Ning Star	+ 15"
10	Logan Currie (NZL)	Lotto–Dstny	+ 15"

=== Points classification ===
Final points classification (1–10)
Rank	Rider	Team	Points
1	Martin Laas (EST)	Ferei Quick-Panda Podium Mongolia Team	46
2	Steffen De Schuyteneer (BEL)	Lotto–Dstny	27
3	Jason Tesson (FRA)	Team TotalEnergies	25
4	Reinardt Janse van Rensburg (RSA)	China Glory–Mentech Continental Cycling Team	25
5	Karl Patrick Lauk (EST)	Huansheng–SCOM–Taishan Sport Cycling Team	24
6	Jelte Krijnsen (NED)	Parkhotel Valkenburg	22
7	Tobiasz Pawlak (POL)	Mazowsze Serce Polski	21
8	Wilmar Paredes (COL)	Team Medellín–EPM	16
9	Jesper Rasch (NED)	Parkhotel Valkenburg	16
10	Rait Ärm (EST)	Van Rysel–Roubaix	16

=== Young rider classification ===
Final young rider classification (1–10)
Rank	Rider	Team	Time
1	Jelte Krijnsen (NED)	Parkhotel Valkenburg	10h 52' 22"
2	Dylan Hopkins (AUS)	Ljubljana Gusto Santic	+ 15"
3	Logan Currie (NZL)	Lotto–Dstny	+ 15"
4	Steffen De Schuyteneer (BEL)	Lotto–Dstny	+ 23"
5	Graeme Frislie (AUS)	CCACHE x Par Küp	+ 32"
6	Michał Pomorski (POL)	Mazowsze Serce Polski	+ 37"
7	Wu Junjie (CHN)	Giant Cycling Team	+ 38"
8	William Heffernan (AUS)	CCACHE x Par Küp	+ 38"
9	Francesc Bennassar (ESP)	Burgos BH	+ 38"
10	Lin Chuanyang (CHN)	Giant Cycling Team	+ 38"

=== Team classification ===
Final team classification (1–10)
Rank	Team	Time
1	(France) Team TotalEnergies	32h 38' 37"
2	(Poland) Mazowsze Serce Polski	+ 0"
3	(France) Van Rysel–Roubaix	+ 0"
4	(Spain) Burgos BH	+ 0"
5	(Spain) Caja Rural–Seguros RGA	+ 0"
6	(Belgium) Lotto–Dstny	+ 0"
7	(China) Huansheng–SCOM–Taishan Sport Cycling Team	+ 0"
8	(Netherlands) Parkhotel Valkenburg	+ 0"
9	(China) Li-Ning Star	+ 0"
10	(Colombia) Team Medellín–EPM	+ 0"
