= 2015 UCI Road World Championships – Men's under-23 road race =

Men's under-23 road race
2015 UCI Road World Championships
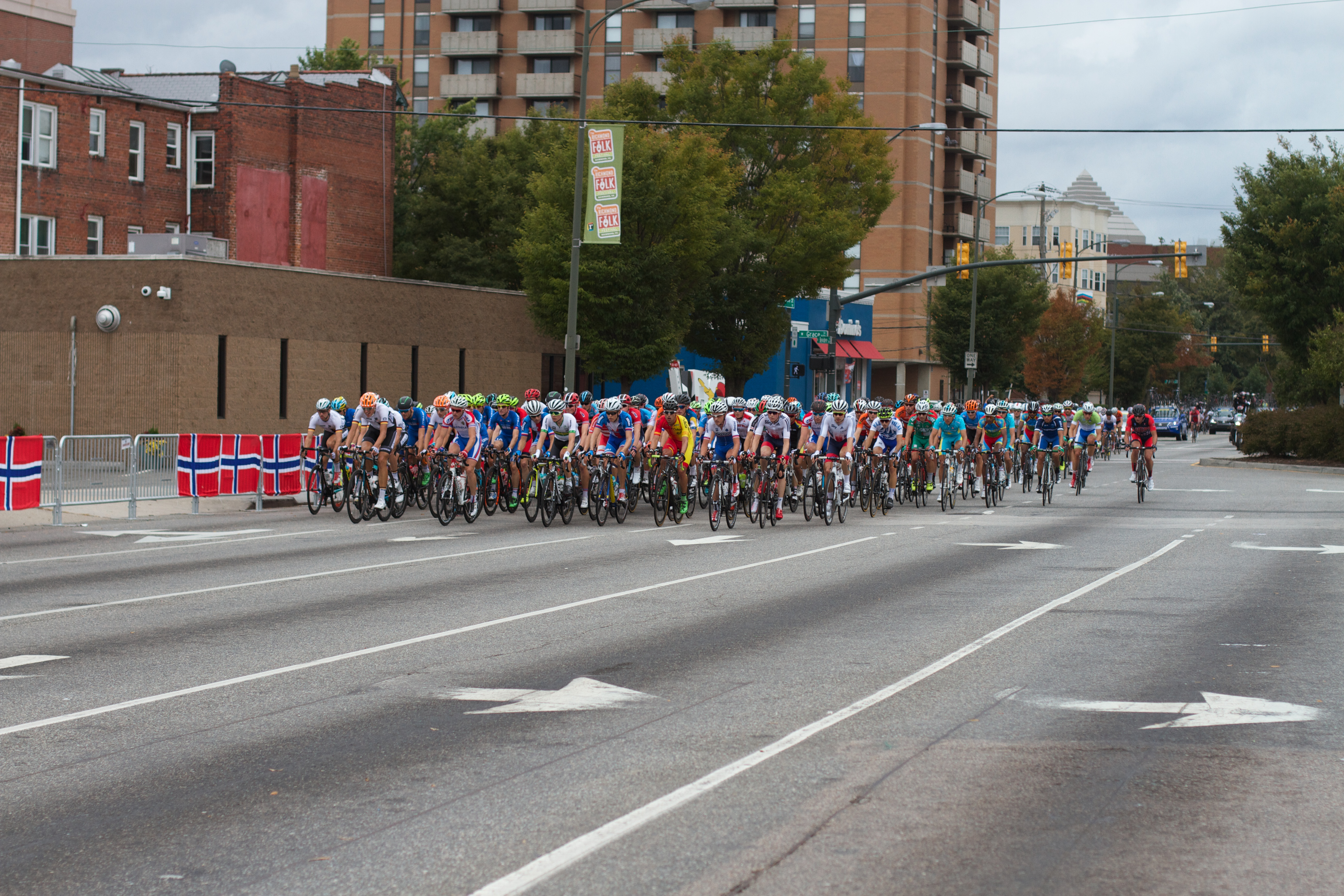
- Peloton during the race

Race details
- Dates: 25 September 2015
- Stages: 1
- Distance: 162.0 km (100.7 mi)
- Winning time: 3h 54' 45"

Medalists
	Gold	Kévin Ledanois (FRA)
	Silver	Simone Consonni (ITA)
	Bronze	Anthony Turgis (FRA)

The Men's under-23 road race of the 2015 UCI Road World Championships took place in and around in Richmond, Virginia, United States on September 25, 2015. The course of the race was 162.0 km (100.7 mi) with the start and finish in Richmond.

Kévin Ledanois became the third French rider to win the title, after making a late solo move in the closing kilometers. He held off Italy's Simone Consonni to take the gold medal, while Ledanois' team mate Anthony Turgis completed the podium, two seconds later.

== Qualification ==
Qualification was based on performances on the UCI run tours and the Men Under 23 Nations' Cup during 2015. Results from January to the middle of August counted towards the qualification criteria. In addition to this number, the current continental champions were also able to take part. The outgoing World Champion, Matej Mohorič, did not compete as he was no longer eligible – he moved to the UCI ProTeam Cannondale–Garmin for the 2015 season. If a nation is included in the final classification of the Men Under 23 Nations' Cup, but that nation was not yet qualified, it may register 6 riders, 3 of whom were starters. The first 5 nations of the final classification of the Men Under 23 Nations' Cup were entitled to an extra rider.

Number of riders	Nations
10 to enter, 5 to start	Algeria, Colombia, Chile, Argentina, Kazakhstan, South Korea, France, Italy, Denmark, Netherlands, Germany, Belgium, Norway, Austria, Great Britain, Turkey, Russia , Estonia, Switzerland, Belarus, Slovakia, Australia
8 to enter, 4 to start	Eritrea, United States, Canada, Mexico, Iran, Japan, Spain, Israel, Czech Republic, Sweden, Portugal
6 to enter, 3 to start	Morocco, South Africa, Rwanda, Venezuela, El Salvador, Ecuador, Lebanon, Hong Kong, Philippines, Ukraine, Slovenia, Serbia, Moldova, Bosnia and Herzegovina, Croatia, Greece, New Zealand
2 to enter, 1 to start	Aruba, Bermuda, Latvia, Georgia

In addition to this number the current continental champions were also able to take part.

Champion	Name
Asian Champion	Yuma Koishi (JPN)
Pan American Champion	Jhonatan Restrepo (COL)
European Champion	Erik Baska (SVK)

== Course ==
Profile of the road race circuit

The under-23 men rode ten laps on the road race circuit. The length of the circuit was 16.2 km (10.1 mi) and had a total elevation of 103 meters (338 feet). All road races took place on a challenging, technical and inner-city road circuit. The circuit headed west from Downtown Richmond, working its way onto Monument Avenue, a paver-lined, historic boulevard that's been named one of the "10 Great Streets in America". Cyclists took a 180-degree turn at the Jefferson Davis monument and then maneuvered through the Uptown district and Virginia Commonwealth University. Halfway through the circuit, the race headed down into Shockoe Bottom before following the canal and passing Great Shiplock Park, the start of the Virginia Capital Trail. A sharp, off-camber turn at Rocketts Landing brought the riders to the narrow, twisty, cobbled 200 meters (660 feet) climb up to Libby Hill Park in the historic Church Hill neighborhood. A quick descent, followed by three hard turns led to a 100 meters (330 feet) climb up 23rd Street. Once atop this steep cobbled hill, riders descended into Shockoe Bottom. This led them to the final 300 meters (980 feet) climb on Governor Street. At the top, the riders had to take a sharp left turn onto the false-flat finishing straight, 680 meters (2,230 feet) to the finish.

== Schedule ==
All times are in Eastern Daylight Time (UTC-4).

Date	Time	Event
25 September 2015	12:45–16:50	Men's under-23 road race

== Participating nations ==
170 cyclists from 52 nations took part in the men's under-23 road race. The number of cyclists per nation is shown in parentheses.

- Argentina (2)
- Algeria (4)
- Australia (5)
- Austria (5)
- Azerbaijan (1)
- Belgium (5)
- Bermuda (1)
- Belarus (1)
- Brazil (1)
- Canada (4)
- Chile (2)
- Colombia (6)
- Croatia (1)
- Czech Republic (4)
- Denmark (5)
- Ecuador (3)
- Eritrea (4)
- El Salvador (1)
- Spain (4)
- Estonia (5)
- France (6)
- Great Britain (5)
- Germany (5)
- Greece (1)
- Ireland (1)
- Israel (4)
- Italy (6)
- Japan (5)
- Kazakhstan (5)
- Latvia (1)
- Lebanon (1)
- Luxembourg (1)
- Morocco (1)
- Moldova (1)
- Mexico (3)
- Mongolia (1)
- North Macedonia (1)
- Netherlands (5)
- Norway (6)
- New Zealand (3)
- Philippines (3)
- Poland (3)
- Portugal (4)
- South Africa (3)
- Russia (6)
- Rwanda (3)
- Slovenia (3)
- Slovakia (3)
- Switzerland (5)
- Sweden (4)
- Ukraine (2)
- United States (5)

== Prize money ==
The UCI assigned premiums for the top 3 finishers with a total prize money of €8,049.

Position	1st	2nd	3rd	Total
Amount	€3,833	€2,683	€1,533	€8,049

== Final classification ==
Of the race's 170 entrants, 130 riders completed the full distance of 162 km (100.7 mi).

Rank	Rider	Country	Time
1	Kévin Ledanois	France	3h 54' 45"
2	Simone Consonni	Italy	s.t.
3	Anthony Turgis	France	+ 2"
4	Gianni Moscon	Italy	+ 2"
5	Alexander Kamp Egested	Denmark	+ 5"
6	Fabian Lienhard	Switzerland	+ 5"
7	Michal Schlegel	Czech Republic	+ 5"
8	Lucas Gaday	Argentina	+ 5"
9	Adam de Vos	Canada	+ 10"
10	Lennard Kämna	Germany	+ 12"
11	Merhawi Kudus	Eritrea	+ 12"
12	Tom Bohli	Switzerland	+ 12"
13	Jack Haig	Australia	+ 12"
14	Tim Kerkhof	Netherlands	+ 13"
15	Mihkel Räim	Estonia	+ 13"
16	Michał Paluta	Poland	+ 13"
17	Benjamin Declercq	Belgium	+ 13"
18	Jakub Kaczmarek	Poland	+ 13"
19	Maxime Farazijn	Belgium	+ 13"
20	Miguel Ángel Benito	Spain	+ 16"
21	Alexander Wachter	Austria	+ 16"
22	Sam Oomen	Netherlands	+ 16"
23	Twan Brusselman	Netherlands	+ 16"
24	Imanol Estévez	Spain	+ 24"
25	Rok Korošec	Slovenia	+ 24"
26	Ben Perry	Canada	+ 24"
27	Lucas Eriksson	Sweden	+ 24"
28	Felix Großschartner	Austria	+ 24"
29	Søren Kragh Andersen	Denmark	+ 24"
30	Sebastian Schönberger	Austria	+ 24"
31	Ignacio Prado	Mexico	+ 29"
32	Fabien Grellier	France	+ 29"
33	Stylianos Farantakis	Greece	+ 29"
34	Josip Rumac	Croatia	+ 35"
35	Jan Dieteren	Germany	+ 37"
36	Dylan Page	Switzerland	+ 37"
37	Laurens De Plus	Belgium	+ 37"
38	Truls Engen Korsæth	Norway	+ 37"
39	Nuno Matos	Portugal	+ 37"
40	David Per	Slovenia	+ 37"
41	Cristian Raileanu	Moldova	+ 37"
42	Anders Skaarseth	Norway	+ 48"
43	Metkel Eyob	Eritrea	+ 48"
44	Héctor Sáez	Spain	+ 48"
45	Yuri Kobashi	Japan	+ 48"
46	Samir Jabrayilov	Azerbaijan	+ 48"
47	Erik Baška	Slovakia	+ 48"
48	Daniel Eaton	United States	+ 48"
49	Gašper Katrašnik	Slovenia	+ 48"
50	Nils Politt	Germany	+ 48"
51	Michael Gogl	Austria	+ 59"
52	Oliviero Troia	Italy	+ 1' 03"
53	Josten Vaidem	Estonia	+ 1' 07"
54	Sergey Luchshenko	Kazakhstan	+ 1' 09"
55	Rui Carvalho	Portugal	+ 1' 12"
56	Nick Schultz	Australia	+ 1' 12"
57	Ildar Arslanov	Russia	+ 1' 12"
58	Amanuel Ghebreigzabhier	Eritrea	+ 1' 12"
59	Hugo Hofstetter	France	+ 1' 12"
60	Guy Gabay	Israel	+ 1' 12"
61	Toshiki Omote	Japan	+ 1' 12"
62	Yevgeniy Gidich	Kazakhstan	+ 1' 12"
63	Ryan Gibbons	South Africa	+ 1' 12"
64	Daan Myngheer	Belgium	+ 1' 12"
65	Maximilian Schachmann	Germany	+ 1' 12"
66	Davide Martinelli	Italy	+ 1' 12"
67	Gregor Mühlberger	Austria	+ 1' 12"
68	Artem Nych	Russia	+ 1' 12"
69	Roman Kustadinchev	Russia	+ 1' 17"
70	James Oram	New Zealand	+ 1' 20"
71	Anass Aït El Abdia	Morocco	+ 1' 25"
72	José Luis Rodríguez	Chile	+ 1' 25"
73	Daniel Hoelgaard	Norway	+ 1' 25"
74	Odd Christian Eiking	Norway	+ 1' 25"
75	Wilmar Paredes	Colombia	+ 1' 25"
76	Oleg Zemlyakov	Kazakhstan	+ 1' 25"
77	Lennard Hofstede	Netherlands	+ 1' 48"
78	Harry Carpenter	Australia	+ 2' 08"
79	Patrick Müller	Switzerland	+ 2' 20"
80	Juan Felipe Osorio	Colombia	+ 2' 22"
81	Marcus Fåglum	Sweden	+ 2' 49"
82	Nathan Van Hooydonck	Belgium	+ 3' 02"
83	Adrian Banaszek	Poland	+ 3' 02"
84	Dion Smith	New Zealand	+ 3' 02"
85	Daniel Turek	Czech Republic	+ 3' 31"

Rank	Rider	Country	Time
86	Josef Černý	Czech Republic	+ 3' 31"
87	Logan Owen	United States	+ 3' 32"
88	Leonardo Basso	Italy	+ 3' 34"
89	Jayde Julius	South Africa	+ 3' 34"
90	Colin Joyce	United States	+ 4' 11"
91	Markus Hoelgaard	Norway	+ 4' 25"
92	Owain Doull	Great Britain	+ 4' 40"
93	Michael Carbel	Denmark	+ 4' 40"
94	Krists Neilands	Latvia	+ 4' 40"
95	Gustav Hoog	Sweden	+ 5' 17"
96	Davide Ballerini	Italy	+ 5' 42"
97	Bonaventure Uwizeyimana	Rwanda	+ 6' 11"
98	Théry Schir	Switzerland	+ 6' 53"
99	Pedro Rodríguez	Ecuador	+ 8' 14"
100	Fabrizio Von Nacher	Mexico	+ 8' 51"
101	Juraj Bellan	Slovakia	+ 9' 46"
102	Stepan Astafyev	Kazakhstan	+ 9' 46"
103	Esteban Villareal	Ecuador	+ 9' 46"
104	João Rodrigues	Portugal	+ 10' 44"
105	Abderrahmane Mansouri	Algeria	+ 10' 44"
106	Aksel Nõmmela	Estonia	+ 10' 44"
107	Ludvig Bengtsson	Sweden	+ 10' 44"
108	Eddie Dunbar	Ireland	+ 10' 44"
109	Adil Barbari	Algeria	+ 10' 44"
110	Dmitriy Lukyanov	Kazakhstan	+ 10' 44"
111	Mamyr Stash	Russia	+ 11' 06"
112	Jonas Gregaard	Denmark	+ 11' 06"
113	Ľuboš Malovec	Slovakia	+ 11' 06"
114	Franck Bonnamour	France	+ 11' 49"
115	Hayden McCormick	New Zealand	+ 11' 49"
116	Juan Ignacio Curuchet	Argentina	+ 12' 04"
117	Roy Goldstein	Israel	+ 14' 27"
118	Yonas Tekeste	Eritrea	+ 14' 27"
119	Tao Geoghegan Hart	Great Britain	+ 15' 19"
120	Ruben Guerreiro	Portugal	+ 15' 19"
121	Aviv Yechezkel	Israel	+ 15' 19"
122	Yūma Koishi	Japan	+ 15' 41"
123	Jhonatan Ospina	Colombia	+ 16' 38"
124	Tyler Williams	United States	+ 16' 38"
125	Valens Ndayisenga	Rwanda	+ 17' 01"
126	Scott Davies	Great Britain	+ 17' 01"
127	Alex Peters	Great Britain	+ 17' 01"
128	Alejandro Morales	Chile	+ 17' 08"
129	Tom Wirtgen	Luxembourg	+ 17' 45"
130	Salvador Martínez	El Salvador	+ 23' 19"
	Jonas Koch	Germany	DNF
	Martin Laas	Estonia	DNF
	Marlen Zmorka	Ukraine	DNF
	Sergiy Kozachenko	Ukraine	DNF
	Nigel Ellsay	Canada	DNF
	Ruslan Giliazov	Russia	DNF
	Alexander Cataford	Canada	DNF
	Marc Fournier	France	DNF
	Suguru Tokuda	Japan	DNF
	Mads Würtz Schmidt	Denmark	DNF
	Caio Godoy	Brazil	DNF
	Gregory Daniel	United States	DNF
	Xavier San Sebastián	Spain	DNF
	Rustom Lim	Philippines	DNF
	Atsushi Oka	Japan	DNF
	Álvaro Hodeg	Colombia	DNF
	Jean Bosco Nsengiyumva	Rwanda	DNF
	Gabriel Cullaigh	Great Britain	DNF
	Nikolay Cherkasov	Russia	DNF
	František Sisr	Czech Republic	DNF
	Andrej Petrovski	North Macedonia	DNF
	Fridtjof Røinås	Norway	DNF
	Dominic Perez	Philippines	DNF
	Juan Sebastián Molano	Colombia	DNF
	Dominique Mayho	Bermuda	DNF
	Miles Scotson	Australia	DNF
	John Camingao	Philippines	DNF
	Jefferson Cepeda	Ecuador	DNF
	Oskar Nisu	Estonia	DNF
	Gerardo Medina	Mexico	DNF
	Nassim Saidi	Algeria	DNF
	Narankhuu Baterdene	Mongolia	DNF
	Abderrahmane Bechlaghem	Algeria	DNF
	Omer Goldstein	Israel	DNF
	Nic Dlamini	South Africa	DNF
	Kolya Shumov	Belarus	DNF
	Jhonatan Restrepo	Colombia	DNF
	Elias Abou Rachid	Lebanon	DNF
	Steven Lammertink	Netherlands	DNF
	Alistair Donohoe	Australia	DSQ

Alistair Donohoe was disqualified: rule 12.1.040.18 holding on to the car.
