= Nisu =

Nisu may refer to:

- Pulla, Finnish pastry
- Nisu language, ethnic sub group in Yunnan China
- Oskar Nisu (born 1994), Estonian cyclist
