= Cycling at the 2019 Island Games =

- Dates: 7–11 July

Cycling, for the 2019 Island Games, held in various locations around Gibraltar in July 2019.

== Medal table ==
Rank	Nation	Gold	Silver	Bronze	Total
1	Isle of Man	5	4	3	12
2	Saaremaa	4	2	1	7
3	Jersey	2	4	2	8
4	Guernsey	1	2	4	7
5	Menorca	0	0	2	2
Totals (5 entries)		12	12	12	36

== Results ==
=== Men ===
Event	Gold		Silver		Bronze	
Time trial	Mihkel Räim; Saaremaa	37:42.24	Sam Culverwell; Guernsey	37:50.24	Adam Scarffe; Isle of Man	38:11:13
Town criterium	Sam Culverwell; Guernsey	59:45.65	Oskar Nisu; Saaremaa	59:45.83	Albert Barceló; Menorca	59:45:97
Road race	Mihkel Räim; Saaremaa	2:15:01.29	Nathan Draper; Isle of Man	2:15:01.96	Steven Kalf; Saaremaa	2:15:01.97
Time trial team	Isle of Man; Thomas Bostock; William Corkill; Nathan Draper; Matt Looker; Adam Scarffe	1:56:31	Saaremaa; Steven Kalf; Karl Patrick Lauk; Jörgen Matt; Oskar Nisu; Mihkel Räim	1:56:51	Guernsey; Marc Cox; Sam Culverwell; Jack English; James Roe; Michael Serafin	1:57:41
Town criterium team	Saaremaa; Steven Kalf; Karl Patrick Lauk; Jörgen Matt; Oskar Nisu; Mihkel Räim	11	Guernsey; Marc Cox; Sam Culverwell; Jack English; James Roe; Michael Serafin	17	Isle of Man; Thomas Bostock; William Corkill; Nathan Draper; Matt Looker; Adam Scarffe	31
Road race team	Saaremaa; Steven Kalf; Karl Patrick Lauk; Jörgen Matt; Oskar Nisu; Mihkel Räim	15	Isle of Man; Thomas Bostock; William Corkill; Nathan Draper; Matt Looker; Adam Scarffe	17	Jersey; Samuel Firby; Rhys Hidrio; David Le Roux; Rhys Pilley; Jack Rebours	22

=== Women ===
Event	Gold		Silver		Bronze	
Time trial	Becky Storrie; Isle of Man	46:10.91	Florence Cox; Jersey	46:12:06	Núria Picó; Menorca	46:54.95
Town criterium	Tara Ferguson; Isle of Man	49:23.54	Rebecca Catley; Jersey	49:23.55	Ellen Barker; Isle of Man	49:23.69
Road race	Florence Cox; Jersey	1:51.41.49	Ellen Barker; Isle of Man	1:51.41.63	Rebecca Catley; Jersey	1:51.42.36
Time trial team	Isle of Man; Ellen Barker; Tara Ferguson; Emily Looker; Kathryn Priest; Becky Storrie	1:34:26	Jersey; Emily Bridson; Rebecca Catley; Florence Cox; Louise Woolrich	1:35:51	Guernsey; Karina Bowie; Hannah Brehaut; Danielle Hanley; Madeline Wilson; Jamie-Lee Wright	1:40:06
Town criterium team	Isle of Man; Ellen Barker; Tara Ferguson; Emily Looker; Kathryn Priest; Becky Storrie	4	Jersey; Emily Bridson; Rebecca Catley; Florence Cox; Louise Woolrich	7	Guernsey; Karina Bowie; Hannah Brehaut; Danielle Hanley; Madeline Wilson; Jamie-Lee Wright	11
Road race team	Jersey; Emily Bridson; Rebecca Catley; Florence Cox; Louise Woolrich	4	Isle of Man; Ellen Barker; Tara Ferguson; Emily Looker; Kathryn Priest; Becky Storrie	7	Guernsey; Karina Bowie; Hannah Brehaut; Danielle Hanley; Madeline Wilson; Jamie-Lee Wright	16
