= Dylan Hopkins =

Dylan Hopkins may refer to:

- Dylan Hopkins (American football) (born 1999), American football quarterback
- Dylan Hopkins (cyclist) (born 2001), Australian road cyclist
