= Marcin Budziński (cyclist) =

Polish cyclist

Personal information
- Born: 24 April 1998 (age 28) Opoczno, Poland
- Height: 1.78 m (5 ft 10 in)
- Weight: 70 kg (154 lb)

Cycling career
- Sport: Cycling
- Current team: MBH Bank CSB Telecom Fort
- Discipline: Road
- Role: Rider

Professional teams
- 2019: Hurom BDC Development
- 2020: Wibatech Merx 7R
- 2021–2024: Mazowsze Serce Polski
- 2025: ATT Investments
- 2026–: MBH Bank CSB Telecom Fort

Marcin Budziński (born 24 April 1998) is a Polish professional racing cyclist, who rides for UCI ProTeam MBH Bank CSB Telecom Fort. His twin brother Tomasz is also a professional cyclist.

== Major results ==
2019
7th Overall Tour de Serbie
2020
1st Memoriał Henryka Łasaka
2021
5th Grand Prix Gündoğmuş
9th Memoriał Henryka Łasaka
9th GP Slovakia
2022
1st Stage 1 (TTT) Belgrade Banjaluka
1st Mountains classification, In the Steps of Romans
2nd Memoriał Henryka Łasaka
6th GP Adria Mobil
6th Fyen Rundt
6th GP Slovenian Istria
8th GP Czech Republic
2023
2nd Overall Tour of Malopolska
3rd Road race, National Road Championships
3rd Overall Tour of Tai Yuan

1st Stage 3

4th Overall Gemenc Grand Prix
4th GP Czech Republic
5th Overall Istrian Spring Trophy
6th GP Goriška & Vipava Valley
10th Overall Tour d'Eure-et-Loir
2024
1st Overall Tour of Mersin
1st Overall Okolo Jižních Čech

1st Stage 3

1st GP Slovenian Istria
1st GP Brda-Collio
2nd Overall Tour of Taihu Lake
2nd Silesian Classic
4th GP Goriška & Vipava Valley
4th Ringerike GP
4th Sundvolden GP
5th GP Adria Mobil
10th Overall Tour of Istanbul
2025
1st International Rhodes Grand Prix
1st GP Brda-Collio
1st Silesian Beskid Race
3rd Grand Prix Vorarlberg
4th Overall International Tour of Rhodes

1st Stage 1

4th Overall Tour of Małopolska
4th Overall Course Cycliste de Solidarnosc et des Champions Olympiques
4th Overall Visit South Aegean Islands
4th Grand Prix Poland
4th Ślężański Mnich
5th GP Slovenian Istria
8th Overall Tour du Loir-et-Cher
9th Overall Okolo Jižních Čech
10th Overall Oberösterreich Rundfahrt

1st Stage 2

2026
2nd Overall Tour of Sharjah
2nd Trofeo Città di Brescia
2nd Classic Loire Atlantique
6th La Popolarissima
6th Hong Kong Cyclothon
8th Grand Prix La Marseillaise
10th NXT Classic
10th Trofeo Alcide Degasperi
