= 2024 Tour of Hainan =

2024 UCI ProSeries

Race details
- Dates: 27–31 August 2024
- Stages: 5
- Distance: 810.5 km (503.6 mi)
- Winning time: 18h 33' 57"

Results
Jersey awarded to the overall winner	Winner	Aaron Gate (NZL)	(Burgos BH)
	Second	Henok Mulubrhan (ERI)	(Astana Qazaqstan Team)
	Third	Filippo Magli (ITA)	(VF Group–Bardiani–CSF–Faizanè)
Jersey awarded to the points classification winner	Points	Aaron Gate (NZL)	(Burgos BH)
Jersey awarded to the mountains classification winner	Mountains	Wilmar Paredes (COL)	(Team Medellín–EPM)
	Team	(Spain) Burgos BH	

The 2024 Tour of Hainan was a men's road cycling stage race that took place from 27 to 31 August 2024. It was the 15th edition of the Tour of Hainan, which was rated as a 2.Pro event on the 2024 UCI ProSeries calendar.

== Teams ==
One UCI WorldTeam, five UCI ProTeams and fourteen UCI Continental teams made up the twenty teams in the race.

UCI WorldTeams

- Astana Qazaqstan Team

UCI ProTeams

- Burgos BH
- Equipo Kern Pharma
- Team Corratec–Vini Fantini
- Team Novo Nordisk
- VF Group–Bardiani–CSF–Faizanè

UCI Continental Teams

- Bodywrap Men's Cycling Team
- China Glory–Mentech Continental Cycling Team
- Ferei Quick-Panda Podium Mongolia Team
- Hainan Wuzhishan Cycling Team
- Hengxiang Cycling Team
- Li-Ning Star
- Malaysia Pro Cycling
- Parkhotel Valkenburg
- Roojai Insurance
- St George Continental Cycling Team
- St. Michel–Mavic–Auber93
- Tarteletto–Isorex
- Team Medellín–EPM
- Terengganu Cycling Team

== Schedule ==
Stage characteristics and winners
Stage	Date	Route	Distance	Type	Stage winner
1	27 August	Qionghai to Qionghai	95.6 km (59.4 mi)	Flat stage	Jakub Mareczko (ITA)
2	28 August	Qionghai to Lingshui	178.9 km (111.2 mi)	Hilly stage	Martin Laas (EST)
3	29 August	Lingshui to Wuzhishan	181.3 km (112.7 mi)	Hilly stage	Aaron Gate (NZL)
4	30 August	Wuzhishan to Changjiang	151.3 km (94.0 mi)	Hilly stage	Aaron Gate (NZL)
5	31 August	Changjiang to Sanya	203.4 km (126.4 mi)	Hilly stage	Ivan Smirnov
Total			810.5 km (503.6 mi)		

== Stages ==
=== Stage 1 ===
27 August 2024 – Qionghai to Qionghai, 95.6 km (59.4 mi)

Stage 1 Result
Rank	Rider	Team	Time
1	Jakub Mareczko (ITA)	Team Corratec–Vini Fantini	2h 02' 44"
2	Miguel Ángel Fernández (ESP)	Equipo Kern Pharma	+ 0"
3	Martin Laas (EST)	Ferei Quick-Panda Podium Mongolia Team	+ 0"
4	Timothy Dupont (BEL)	Tarteletto–Isorex	+ 0"
5	Enrico Zanoncello (ITA)	VF Group–Bardiani–CSF–Faizanè	+ 0"
6	Jesper Rasch (NED)	Parkhotel Valkenburg	+ 0"
7	George Jackson (NZL)	Burgos BH	+ 0"
8	Aliaksei Shnyrko	Li-Ning Star	+ 0"
9	Merhawi Kudus (ERI)	Terengganu Cycling Team	+ 0"
10	Ivan Smirnov	Astana Qazaqstan Team	+ 0"

General classification after Stage 1
Rank	Rider	Team	Time
1	Jakub Mareczko (ITA)	Team Corratec–Vini Fantini	2h 02' 34"
2	Miguel Ángel Fernández (ESP)	Equipo Kern Pharma	+ 4"
3	Martin Laas (EST)	Ferei Quick-Panda Podium Mongolia Team	+ 6"
4	Māris Bogdanovičs (LAT)	Hengxiang Cycling Team	+ 7"
5	Aaron Gate (NZL)	Burgos BH	+ 8"
6	Wang Kuicheng (CHN)	Bodywrap Men's Cycling Team	+ 9"
7	Timothy Dupont (BEL)	Tarteletto–Isorex	+ 10"
8	Enrico Zanoncello (ITA)	VF Group–Bardiani–CSF–Faizanè	+ 10"
9	Jesper Rasch (NED)	Parkhotel Valkenburg	+ 10"
10	George Jackson (NZL)	Burgos BH	+ 10"

=== Stage 2 ===
28 August 2024 – Qionghai to Lingshui, 178.9 km (111.2 mi)

Stage 2 Result
Rank	Rider	Team	Time
1	Martin Laas (EST)	Ferei Quick-Panda Podium Mongolia Team	4h 06' 04"
2	Aaron Gate (NZL)	Burgos BH	+ 0"
3	Timothy Dupont (BEL)	Tarteletto–Isorex	+ 0"
4	Ma Binyan (CHN)	China Glory–Mentech Continental Cycling Team	+ 0"
5	Jakub Mareczko (ITA)	Team Corratec–Vini Fantini	+ 0"
6	Henok Mulubrhan (ERI)	Astana Qazaqstan Team	+ 0"
7	Mohamad Izzat Hilmi Abdul Halil (MAS)	Malaysia Pro Cycling	+ 0"
8	Francisco Galván (ESP)	Equipo Kern Pharma	+ 0"
9	Georgios Bouglas (GRE)	Burgos BH	+ 0"
10	Merhawi Kudus (ERI)	Terengganu Cycling Team	+ 0"

General classification after Stage 2
Rank	Rider	Team	Time
1	Martin Laas (EST)	Ferei Quick-Panda Podium Mongolia Team	6h 08' 34"
2	Jakub Mareczko (ITA)	Team Corratec–Vini Fantini	+ 4"
3	Aaron Gate (NZL)	Burgos BH	+ 6"
4	Miguel Ángel Fernández (ESP)	Equipo Kern Pharma	+ 8"
5	Timothy Dupont (BEL)	Tarteletto–Isorex	+ 10"
6	Māris Bogdanovičs (LAT)	Hengxiang Cycling Team	+ 11"
7	Luke Mudgway (NZL)	Li-Ning Star	+ 11"
8	Nur Aiman Rosli (MAS)	Terengganu Cycling Team	+ 11"
9	Filippo Magli (ITA)	VF Group–Bardiani–CSF–Faizanè	+ 12"
10	Fan Yihua (CHN)	Bodywrap Men's Cycling Team	+ 12"

=== Stage 3 ===
29 August 2024 – Lingshui to Wuzhishan, 181.3 km (112.7 mi)

Stage 3 Result
Rank	Rider	Team	Time
1	Aaron Gate (NZL)	Burgos BH	4h 21' 32"
2	Wilmar Paredes (COL)	Team Medellín–EPM	+ 6"
3	Henok Mulubrhan (ERI)	Astana Qazaqstan Team	+ 6"
4	Filippo Magli (ITA)	VF Group–Bardiani–CSF–Faizanè	+ 6"
5	Alexandre Delettre (FRA)	St. Michel–Mavic–Auber93	+ 6"
6	Jambaljamts Sainbayar (MGL)	Burgos BH	+ 6"
7	Jordi López (ESP)	Equipo Kern Pharma	+ 6"
8	Nicolas Breuillard (FRA)	St. Michel–Mavic–Auber93	+ 6"
9	Lorenzo Quartucci (ITA)	Team Corratec–Vini Fantini	+ 6"
10	Cristian Raileanu (ROM)	Li-Ning Star	+ 6"

General classification after Stage 3
Rank	Rider	Team	Time
1	Aaron Gate (NZL)	Burgos BH	10h 30' 02"
2	Wilmar Paredes (COL)	Team Medellín–EPM	+ 18"
3	Henok Mulubrhan (ERI)	Astana Qazaqstan Team	+ 20"
4	Filippo Magli (ITA)	VF Group–Bardiani–CSF–Faizanè	+ 22"
5	José Manuel Díaz (ESP)	Burgos BH	+ 22"
6	Merhawi Kudus (ERI)	Terengganu Cycling Team	+ 24"
7	Cristian Raileanu (ROM)	Li-Ning Star	+ 24"
8	Jordi López (ESP)	Equipo Kern Pharma	+ 24"
9	Álex Jaime (ESP)	Equipo Kern Pharma	+ 24"
10	Jambaljamts Sainbayar (MGL)	Burgos BH	+ 24"

=== Stage 4 ===
30 August 2024 – Wuzhishan to Changjiang, 151.3 km (94.0 mi)

Stage 4 Result
Rank	Rider	Team	Time
1	Aaron Gate (NZL)	Burgos BH	3h 33' 39"
2	Enrico Zanoncello (ITA)	VF Group–Bardiani–CSF–Faizanè	+ 0"
3	Timothy Dupont (BEL)	Tarteletto–Isorex	+ 0"
4	Luke Mudgway (NZL)	Li-Ning Star	+ 0"
5	Miguel Ángel Fernández (ESP)	Equipo Kern Pharma	+ 0"
6	Ivan Smirnov	Astana Qazaqstan Team	+ 0"
7	Álex Jaime (ESP)	Equipo Kern Pharma	+ 0"
8	Alexandre Delettre (FRA)	St. Michel–Mavic–Auber93	+ 0"
9	Niek Voogt (NED)	Parkhotel Valkenburg	+ 0"
10	Lü Xianjing (CHN)	China Glory–Mentech Continental Cycling Team	+ 0"

General classification after Stage 4
Rank	Rider	Team	Time
1	Aaron Gate (NZL)	Burgos BH	14h 03' 28"
2	Wilmar Paredes (COL)	Team Medellín–EPM	+ 31"
3	Henok Mulubrhan (ERI)	Astana Qazaqstan Team	+ 33"
4	Cristian Raileanu (ROM)	Li-Ning Star	+ 35"
5	Filippo Magli (ITA)	VF Group–Bardiani–CSF–Faizanè	+ 35"
6	Álex Jaime (ESP)	Equipo Kern Pharma	+ 35"
7	José Manuel Díaz (ESP)	Burgos BH	+ 35"
8	Alexandre Delettre (FRA)	St. Michel–Mavic–Auber93	+ 36"
9	Merhawi Kudus (ERI)	Terengganu Cycling Team	+ 37"
10	Jordi López (ESP)	Equipo Kern Pharma	+ 37"

=== Stage 5 ===
31 August 2024 – Changjiang to Sanya, 203.4 km (126.4 mi)

Stage 5 Result
Rank	Rider	Team	Time
1	Ivan Smirnov	Astana Qazaqstan Team	4h 30' 29"
2	Timothy Dupont (BEL)	Tarteletto–Isorex	+ 0"
3	Mattia Pinazzi (ITA)	VF Group–Bardiani–CSF–Faizanè	+ 0"
4	Ma Binyan (CHN)	China Glory–Mentech Continental Cycling Team	+ 0"
5	Georgios Bouglas (GRE)	Burgos BH	+ 0"
6	Jesper Rasch (NED)	Parkhotel Valkenburg	+ 0"
7	Aaron Gate (NZL)	Burgos BH	+ 0"
8	Declan Irvine (AUS)	Team Novo Nordisk	+ 0"
9	Umberto Poli (ITA)	Team Novo Nordisk	+ 0"
10	Filippo Magli (ITA)	VF Group–Bardiani–CSF–Faizanè	+ 0"

General classification after Stage 5
Rank	Rider	Team	Time
1	Aaron Gate (NZL)	Burgos BH	18h 33' 57"
2	Henok Mulubrhan (ERI)	Astana Qazaqstan Team	+ 30"
3	Filippo Magli (ITA)	VF Group–Bardiani–CSF–Faizanè	+ 33"
4	Jordi López (ESP)	Equipo Kern Pharma	+ 35"
5	Cristian Raileanu (ROM)	Li-Ning Star	+ 35"
6	Álex Jaime (ESP)	Equipo Kern Pharma	+ 35"
7	José Manuel Díaz (ESP)	Burgos BH	+ 35"
8	Alexandre Delettre (FRA)	St. Michel–Mavic–Auber93	+ 36"
9	Lorenzo Quartucci (ITA)	Team Corratec–Vini Fantini	+ 37"
10	Jambaljamts Sainbayar (MGL)	Burgos BH	+ 37"

== Classification leadership table ==
Classification leadership by stage
Stage	Winner	General classification	Points classification	Mountains classification	Team classification
1	Jakub Mareczko	Jakub Mareczko	Jakub Mareczko	Xue Chaohua	Equipo Kern Pharma
2	Martin Laas	Martin Laas	Martin Laas	Kane Richards	Equipo Kern Pharma
3	Aaron Gate	Aaron Gate	Aaron Gate	Jambaljamts Sainbayar	Burgos BH
4	Aaron Gate	Aaron Gate	Aaron Gate	Alex Vandenbulcke	Burgos BH
5	Ivan Smirnov	Aaron Gate	Aaron Gate	Wilmar Paredes	Burgos BH
Final		Aaron Gate	Aaron Gate	Wilmar Paredes	Burgos BH

== Classification standings ==
Legend
Denotes the winner of the general classification
Denotes the winner of the points classification
Denotes the winner of the mountains classification

=== General classification ===
Final general classification (1–10)
Rank	Rider	Team	Time
1	Aaron Gate (NZL)	Burgos BH	18h 33' 57"
2	Henok Mulubrhan (ERI)	Astana Qazaqstan Team	+ 30"
3	Filippo Magli (ITA)	VF Group–Bardiani–CSF–Faizanè	+ 33"
4	Jordi López (ESP)	Equipo Kern Pharma	+ 35"
5	Cristian Raileanu (ROM)	Li-Ning Star	+ 35"
6	Álex Jaime (ESP)	Equipo Kern Pharma	+ 35"
7	José Manuel Díaz (ESP)	Burgos BH	+ 35"
8	Alexandre Delettre (FRA)	St. Michel–Mavic–Auber93	+ 36"
9	Lorenzo Quartucci (ITA)	Team Corratec–Vini Fantini	+ 37"
10	Jambaljamts Sainbayar (MGL)	Burgos BH	+ 37"

=== Points classification ===
Final points classification (1–10)
Rank	Rider	Team	Points
1	Aaron Gate (NZL)	Burgos BH	65
2	Timothy Dupont (BEL)	Tarteletto–Isorex	53
3	Ivan Smirnov	Astana Qazaqstan Team	38
4	Martin Laas (EST)	Ferei Quick-Panda Podium Mongolia Team	33
5	Filippo Magli (ITA)	VF Group–Bardiani–CSF–Faizanè	30
6	Enrico Zanoncello (ITA)	VF Group–Bardiani–CSF–Faizanè	30
7	Miguel Ángel Fernández (ESP)	Equipo Kern Pharma	29
8	Henok Mulubrhan (ERI)	Astana Qazaqstan Team	28
9	Ma Binyan (CHN)	China Glory–Mentech Continental Cycling Team	24
10	Alexandre Delettre (FRA)	St. Michel–Mavic–Auber93	20

=== Mountains classification ===
Final mountains classification (1–10)
Rank	Rider	Team	Points
1	Wilmar Paredes (COL)	Team Medellín–EPM	27
2	Alex Vandenbulcke (BEL)	Tarteletto–Isorex	21
3	Jon Agirre (ESP)	Equipo Kern Pharma	19
4	Jambaljamts Sainbayar (MGL)	Burgos BH	17
5	Jordi López (ESP)	Equipo Kern Pharma	15
6	Manuele Tarozzi (ITA)	VF Group–Bardiani–CSF–Faizanè	12
7	Róbigzon Oyola (COL)	Team Medellín–EPM	12
8	Lucas De Rossi (FRA)	China Glory–Mentech Continental Cycling Team	9
9	Andreas Miltiadis (CYP)	Terengganu Cycling Team	9
10	Kane Richards (AUS)	Roojai Insurance	7

=== Team classification ===
Final team classification (1–10)
Rank	Team	Time
1	(Spain) Burgos BH	55h 43' 36"
2	(Spain) Equipo Kern Pharma	+ 6"
3	(France) St. Michel–Mavic–Auber93	+ 6"
4	(Italy) VF Group–Bardiani–CSF–Faizanè	+ 57"
5	(Colombia) Team Medellín–EPM	+ 5' 00"
6	(Italy) Team Corratec–Vini Fantini	+ 5' 15"
7	(China) Li-Ning Star	+ 5' 43"
8	(Malaysia) Terengganu Cycling Team	+ 7' 57"
9	(Thailand) Roojai Insurance	+ 9' 21"
10	(Belgium) Tarteletto–Isorex	+ 12' 57"
