= Álex Jaime =

Spanish cyclist

Personal information
- Full name: Álex Jaime Fernández
- Born: 29 September 1998 (age 28) Sarrià de Ter, Spain
- Height: 1.83 m (6 ft 0 in)
- Weight: 70 kg (154 lb)

Cycling career
- Sport: Cycling
- Current team: Equipo Kern Pharma
- Discipline: Road
- Role: Rider

Amateur teams
- 2016–2016: Huesca La Magia
- 2017–2020: Lizarte

Professional team
- 2021–: Equipo Kern Pharma

Álex Jaime Fernández (born 29 September 1998) is a Spanish cyclist, who currently rides for UCI ProTeam Equipo Kern Pharma.

== Major results ==
2016
1st Road race, National Junior Road Championships
2021
10th Vuelta a Castilla y León
7th Overall Volta ao Alentejo
2022
4th Clàssica Comunitat Valenciana 1969
2023
2nd Clássica da Arrábida
2024
6th Overall Tour of Hainan
