= Quick Pro Team =

Estonian cycling team

Team information
- UCI code: QPT
- Registered: Mongolia (2022–2024); Estonia (2025–)
- Founded: 2022
- Discipline: Road
- Status: UCI Continental
- Bicycles: Quick
- Website: Team home page

Key personnel
- General manager: Xiaoyang Chen
- Team managers: Kai Wing Tam; Rigo Raim

Team name history
- 2022; 2023; 2024; 2025–: Ferei Mongolia Development Team; Ferei Mongolia Team; Ferei Quick-Panda Podium Mongolia; Quick Pro Team

Quick Pro Team is an Estonian-registered UCI Continental road cycling team founded in 2022. Prior to 2025, the team was based in Mongolia under the sponsor Ferei. The team moved to Estonia after signing several Estonian riders and one Finnish rider in 2024.

== Team roster ==
As of 23 June 2025.

Rider	Date of birth
Aaron Aus (EST)	10 March 2004 (age 22)
Myagmarsuren Baasankhuu (MGL)	16 April 1991 (age 35)
Hu Hang Yu (CHN)	18 December 1992 (age 33)
Bilguun Injyenyer (MGL)	31 May 2004 (age 22)
Gleb Karpenko (EST)	27 October 2001 (age 24)
Oskar Küüt (EST)	20 September 2005 (age 20)
Martin Laas (EST)	15 September 1993 (age 32)

Rider	Date of birth
Karl Patrick Lauk (EST)	9 January 1997 (age 29)
Liu Zhenlong (CHN)	26 December 2000 (age 25)
Lo Chun Kit (HKG)	5 February 1995 (age 31)
Oskar Nisu (EST)	11 August 1994 (age 32)
Mihkel Räim (EST)	3 July 1993 (age 33)
Enkhpurev Tsoodol (MGL)	3 March 2005 (age 21)

== Major wins ==
2022
Mongolia National Under-23 Road Race Championships, Amartuvshin Battsengel
Mongolia National Under-23 Time Trial Championships, Amartuvshin Battsengel
2023
Mongolia National Under-23 Time Trial Championships, Amartuvshin Battsengel
2024
Mongolia National Road Race Championships, Bilguunjargal Erdenebat
Stages 1 & 3 Tour of Taihu Lake, Martin Laas
Stage 2 Tour of Hainan, Martin Laas
Stages 3, 8 & 9 Tour of Poyang Lake, Martin Laas
Stages 4 & 5 Tour of Lithuania, Martin Laas
Tour de Banyuwangi Ijen

Stage 2, Martin Laas
Stage 3, Oskar Nisu

Stage 1 Trans-Himalaya Cycling Race, Martin Laas
2025
Overall Tour of Lithuania, Martin Laas

Stages 1, 3 & 4, Martin Laas
