= Jordi López (cyclist) =

Spanish cyclist

Personal information
- Full name: Jordi López Caravaca
- Born: 14 August 1998 (age 28) Badalona, Spain
- Height: 1.70 m (5 ft 7 in)
- Weight: 59 kg (130 lb)

Cycling career
- Sport: Cycling
- Current team: Euskaltel–Euskadi
- Discipline: Road
- Role: Rider

Amateur teams
- 2016: Huesca La Magia
- 2017–2020: Lizarte

Professional teams
- 2020: Equipo Kern Pharma (stagiaire)
- 2021–2024: Equipo Kern Pharma
- 2025–: Euskaltel–Euskadi

Jordi López Caravaca (born 14 August 1998) is a Spanish cyclist, who currently rides for UCI ProTeam Euskaltel–Euskadi.

== Major results ==
2021
5th Trofeo Calvià
7th Overall Volta ao Alentejo
2023 (1 pro win)
2nd Overall Tour de Taiwan

1st Stage 2

10th Overall Tour of Slovenia
2024
4th Overall Tour of Hainan
10th Overall GP Beiras e Serra da Estrela
2025
3rd Overall Tour de Taiwan
1st Stage 2 GP Beiras e Serra da Estrela
2026
3rd Overall Tour de Taiwan
7th Circuito de Getxo
