= Becky Storrie =

British cyclist (born 1998)

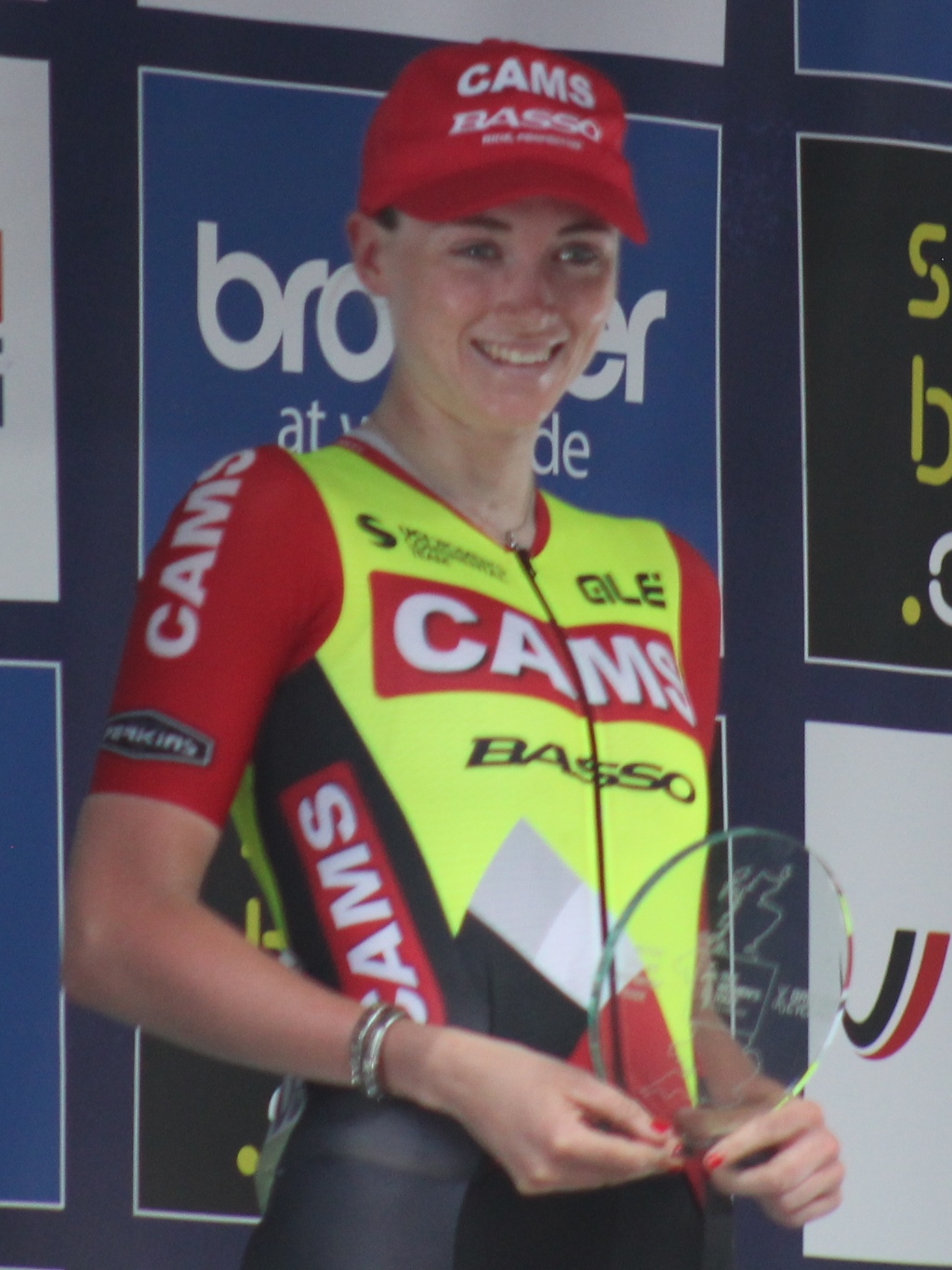
- Storrie with the 2022 The Women's Tour Best British Rider trophy

Personal information
- Full name: Rebecca Storrie
- Born: 27 September 1998 (age 28) Ballasalla, Isle of Man

Cycling career
- Sport: Cycling
- Current team: Team Picnic–PostNL
- Discipline: Road
- Role: Rider

Amateur team
- 2019–2020: Brother UK–OnForm

Professional teams
- 2021–2022: DAS–Hutchinson
- 2023–: Team Picnic–PostNL

Becky Storrie (born 27 September 1998) is a professional road cyclist from the Isle of Man who currently rides for Team Picnic–PostNL, a UCI Women's WorldTeam.

== Early life and education ==
Storrie was born in the Isle of Man, where she attended Ballasalla Primary School followed by Castle Rushen High School. After participating in several sports during her childhood, she first represented the Isle of Man in swimming. At the age of 14, she took part in her first triathlon, for which fellow Manx cyclist Lizzie Holden lent her a bicycle.

She gained a sports scholarship to pursue triathlon at the University of Stirling while also studying for a degree in sport and psychology. During her second year she collapsed two days in succession as a result of overtraining, resulting in chronic fatigue. This led to her taking an eight-month break from all physical exercise, after which she decided to restrict her sporting activities to cycling.

== Cycling career ==
Storrie took part in her first cycling race in February 2019. That July, she won a gold medal representing the Isle of Man in the time trial at the time trial at the 2019 Island Games, and also finished fifth in the road race. Following an enforced break from racing during the COVID-19 lockdowns, she won the under-23 title at the 2020 British Hill Climb Championship and placed third overall.

She was Scottish road race champion in 2021. She also took podium places in the Capenwray road race and the Ryedale Grand Prix, riding for British amateur team Brother UK–Team OnForm.

The next year she was recruited by CAMS–Basso Bikes, a UCI Women's Continental Team and became a full-time cyclist. She won the 2022 Lincoln Grand Prix, and represented the Isle of Man in road cycling at the 2022 Commonwealth Games, finishing 6th in the time trial and 26th in the road race. She also raced in the 2022 The Women's Tour, where she placed ninth on stage 5 and 15th overall, earning her the best British rider trophy.

In 2023, she joined Team DSM (now named Team Picnic–PostNL), a UCI Women's WorldTour Team. She rode for Great Britain in the women's road race at the 2023 European Road Championship, placing 39th.

Storrie's 2024 season was marred by three collar bone breakages: during training in April, at the 2024 Giro d'Italia Women in July, and in August at the 2024 Tour de France Femmes. That October, she was awarded a three-year contract to stay at the team until at least 2027.
