= Filippo Magli =

Italian cyclist (born 1999)

- Magli in 2026

Personal information
- Born: 29 April 1999 (age 27) Empoli, Italy

Cycling career
- Sport: Cycling
- Current team: Bardiani–CSF 7 Saber
- Discipline: Road
- Role: Rider

Amateur teams
- 2012–2015: San Miniato Ciclismo
- 2016–2017: Stabbia Ciclismo
- 2018–2022: GS Mastromarco–Sensi–FC Nibali

Professional teams
- 2021: Bardiani–CSF–Faizanè (stagiaire)
- 2022: Bardiani–CSF–Faizanè (stagiaire)
- 2023–: Green Project–Bardiani–CSF–Faizanè

Filippo Magli (born 29 April 1999) is an Italian racing cyclist, who currently rides for UCI ProTeam Bardiani–CSF 7 Saber.

== Major results ==
2017
2nd Gran Premio dell'Arno
6th Overall Ain Bugey Valromey Tour
6th Trofeo Emilio Paganessi
7th Trofeo Guido Dorigo
2019
6th Gran Premio Sportivi di Poggiana
2021
2nd Giro del Casentino
4th Il Piccolo Lombardia
10th Ruota d'Oro
2023
1st Muur Classic Geraardsbergen
4th Road race, National Road Championships
6th Giro della Provincia di Reggio Calabria
7th GP Goriska & Vipava Valley
2024
3rd Overall Tour of Hainan
4th Gran Piemonte
10th Overall Alpes Isère Tour
2025
5th Cholet Agglo Tour
7th Trofeo Matteotti
8th Coppa Bernocchi
10th GP Industria & Artigianato di Larciano

=== Grand Tour general classification results timeline ===
Grand Tour	2023	2024	2025
Giro d'Italia	105	—	116
Tour de France	—	—	—
Vuelta a España	—	—	—

Legend
—	Did not compete
DNF	Did not finish
