= Wilmar Paredes =

Colombian cyclist (born 1996)

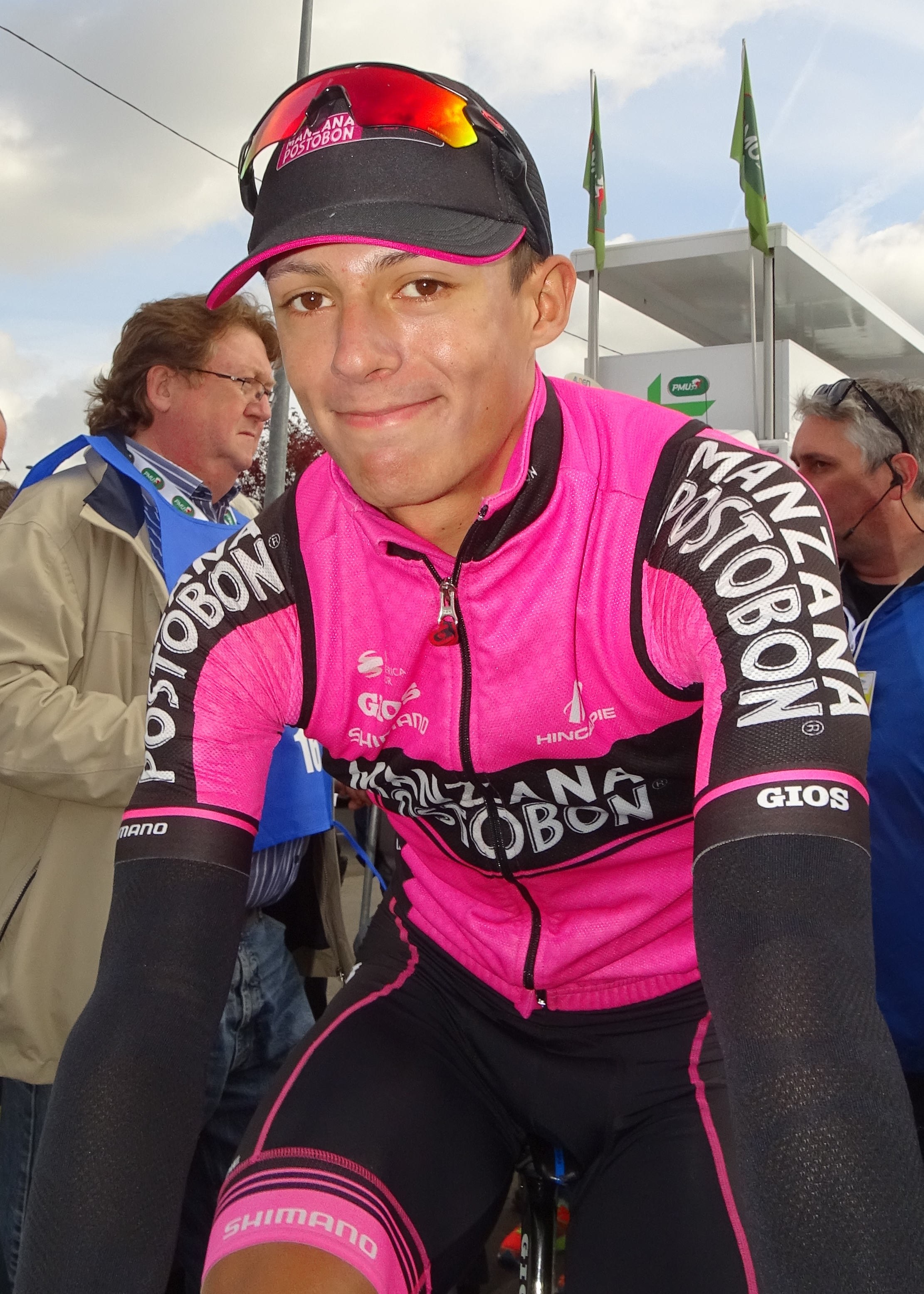
- Paredes in 2017.

Personal information
- Full name: Wilmar Andrés Paredes Zapata
- Born: 27 April 1996 (age 30) Medellín, Colombia
- Height: 1.79 m (5 ft 10 in)
- Weight: 66 kg (146 lb)

Cycling career
- Sport: Cycling
- Current team: Team Medellín–EPM
- Disciplines: Road; Track
- Role: Rider
- Rider type: All-rounder

Amateur team
- 2015: Team Manzana Postobón

Professional teams
- 2016–2019: Team Manzana Postobón
- 2023–: Team Medellín–EPM
Medal record
Representing Colombia
Men's track cycling
Pan American Championships
Gold medal – first place	2016 Aguascalientes	Team pursuit
World Junior Championships
Silver medal – second place	2014 Gwangmyeong	Team pursuit
Men's road cycling
Pan American Championships
Bronze medal – third place	2024 São José dos Campos	Road race

Wilmar Andrés Paredes Zapata (born 27 April 1996) is a Colombian road and track cyclist, who currently rides for UCI Continental team Team Medellín–EPM. He was provisionally suspended from the sport for four years from February 2019 to February 2023. He competed as a junior at the 2014 UCI Road World Championships in the men's junior road race and as an under-23 rider at the 2015 UCI Road World Championships in the men's under-23 road race. He won the gold medal at the 2016 Pan American Track Cycling Championships in the team pursuit.

In April 2019, Paredes returned an adverse analytical finding (AAF) for erythropoietin (EPO) in an out-of-competition control taken in February 2019. Team Manzana Postobón folded in May, due to the doping cases of Paredes and teammate Juan José Amador.

== Major results ==
=== Track ===
2014
2nd Team pursuit, UCI Junior World Championships
2016
1st Team pursuit, Pan American Championships

=== Road ===
2014
1st Road race, Pan American Junior Road Championships
2015
5th Road race, Pan American Under-23 Championships
2017
1st Young rider classification, Circuit de la Sarthe
1st Mountains classification, Tour des Fjords
1st Stage 2 Vuelta a Colombia
2nd Klasika Primavera
2018
3rd Klasika Primavera
6th Overall Volta Internacional Cova da Beira
7th La Roue Tourangelle
10th Overall Circuit de la Sarthe

1st Young rider classification

2023
2nd Overall Vuelta al Sur
8th Overall Vuelta a Formosa
2024
1st Overall Jamaica International Cycling Classic

1st Stage 1

1st Mountains classification, Tour of Hainan
1st Stage 1 Vuelta Bantrab
1st Stages 1 (TTT) & 3 Clásico RCN
2nd Overall Tour do Rio
2nd Gran Premio New York City
3rd Overall Tour of Taihu Lake
3rd Overall Tour of the Gila

1st Mountains classification
1st Stages 1 & 5

3rd Road race, Pan American Road Championships
2025
1st Stage 3 Vuelta Bantrab
1st Stages 1 & 7 Vuelta a Colombia
1st Stages 1, 3 & 8 Clásico RCN
1st Stage 2 Vuelta Bantrab
3rd Overall Vuelta al Tolima

1st Stage 4

3rd Overall Vuelta a la Independencia Nacional
2026
1st Overall Tour de Beauce

1st Points classification
1st Stage 5

1st Overall Volta Ciclistica Internacional do Estado de São Paulo

1st Points classification

1st Overall Vuelta a la Independencia Nacional

1st Points classification
1st Stage 2

1st Overall Clásica de Rionegro

1st Stages 1 (TTT) & 2

1st Circuito Miguel Sanabria
1st Stages 1, 2, 3 & 4 Vuelta a Colombia
1st Stage 5 Tour of America's Dairyland
3rd Gran Premio New York City
4th Desafio das Américas de Ciclismo
