= 2018 Klasika Primavera =

2018 UCI Europe Tour

Race details
- Dates: 8 April 2018
- Stages: 1
- Distance: 171.6 km (106.6 mi)
- Winning time: 4h 06' 11"

Results
	Winner	Andrey Amador (CRC)	(Movistar Team)
	Second	Alejandro Valverde (ESP)	(Movistar Team)
	Third	Wilmar Paredes (COL)	(Team Manzana Postobón)

The 2018 Klasika Primavera was the 64th edition of the Klasika Primavera, a one-day road cycling race, held on 8 April 2018. It was part of the 2018 UCI Europe Tour as a category 1.1 event.

== Teams ==
Fourteen teams started the race. Each team had a maximum of seven riders:

UCI WorldTeams

- Movistar Team

UCI Professional Continental teams

- Euskadi–Murias
- Burgos BH
- Rally Cycling
- Caja Rural–Seguros RGA
- Team Manzana Postobón

UCI Continental teams

- Team Ukyo
- Massi–Kuwait
- Polartec–Kometa
- Java Partizan
- VIB Sports
- W52 / FC Porto
- Fundación Euskadi
- Lokosphinx

== Result ==
The race was won by the Costa Rican cyclist Andrey Amador of Movistar Team, ahead of his Spanish teammate Alejandro Valverde and Wilmar Paredes of Team Manzana Postobón.

Final general classification

Rank	Rider	Team	Time
1	Andrey Amador (CRC)	Movistar Team	4h 06' 11"
2	Alejandro Valverde (ESP)	Movistar Team	s.t.
3	Wilmar Paredes (COL)	Team Manzana Postobón	+ 10"
4	Carlos Betancur (COL)	Movistar Team	s.t.
5	Dmitry Strakhov (RUS)	Lokosphinx	s.t.
6	Gustavo César (ESP)	W52 / FC Porto	s.t.
7	Nick Schultz (AUS)	Caja Rural–Seguros RGA	s.t.
8	Alexander Evtushenko (RUS)	Lokosphinx	+ 26"
9	Sergio Higuita (COL)	Team Manzana Postobón	+ 30"
10	Bernardo Suaza (COL)	Team Manzana Postobón	s.t.
