= Lizarte =

Spanish cycling team

Team information
- Registered: Spain
- Founded: 1993
- Discipline: Road
- Status: Amateur

Team name history
- 1993–2013 2014 2014–: Lizarte; Lizarte–AD Galibier; Lizarte

Lizarte is a Spanish amateur cycling team founded in 1993. From its creation until 2019, Lizarte was the primary team as part of the Asociación Deportiva Galibier organisation. In 2020, a professional team Equipo Kern Pharma was established by the organisation, with Lizarte acting as a feeder team.

== Team roster ==
As of 25 March 2020.

Rider	Date of birth
Pablo Castrillo (ESP)	2 January 2001 (age 25)
Iván Cobo (ESP)	2 January 2000 (age 26)
Unai Esparza (ESP)	2 June 2000 (age 26)
Sinuhé Fernández (ESP)	15 June 2000 (age 26)
Raúl García Pierna (ESP)	23 February 2001 (age 25)
Jon Gil (ESP)	25 March 2001 (age 25)
Pepe Ginestar (ESP)	15 February 2001 (age 25)
Mateo González (ESP)	24 November 2000 (age 25)
Javier Ibáñez (ESP)	29 November 2001 (age 24)
Álex Jaime (ESP)	29 September 1998 (age 27)

Rider	Date of birth
Jordi López (ESP)	14 August 1998 (age 28)
Pau Miquel (ESP)	20 August 2000 (age 26)
Mikel Retegi (ESP)	27 April 2001 (age 25)
Ferrán Robert (ESP)	2 May 1998 (age 28)
Juan José Rosal (ESP)	18 July 2001 (age 25)
Raúl Rota (ESP)	18 November 1999 (age 26)
Carlos Ruiz (ESP)	7 July 1997 (age 29)
Eugenio Sánchez (ESP)	10 March 1999 (age 27)
Diego Uriarte (ESP)	26 October 2001 (age 24)
Dylan Westley (GBR)	13 March 2001 (age 25)
