= Kévin Ledanois =

French road cyclist (born 1993)

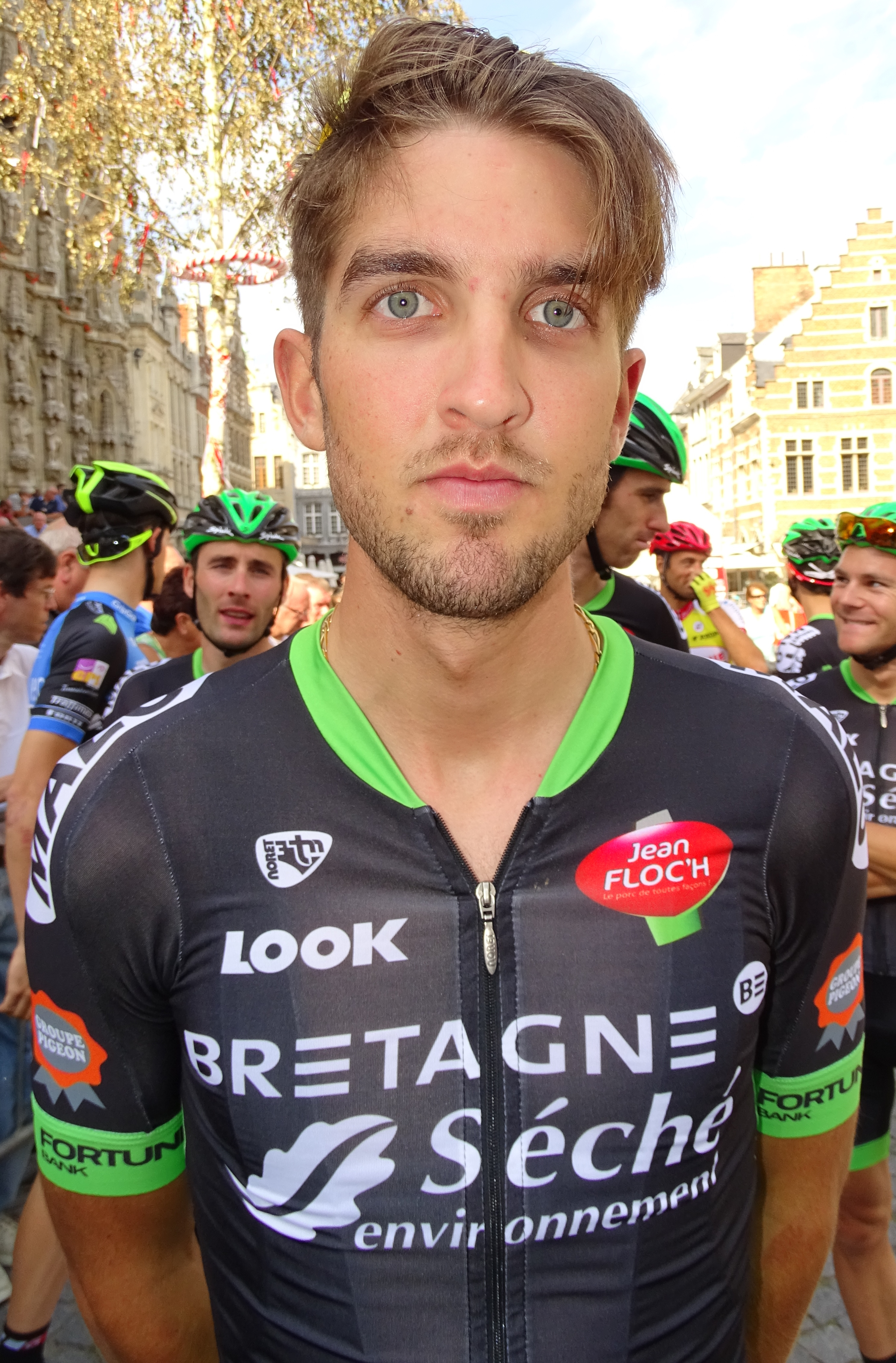
- Ledanois in 2015

Personal information
- Full name: Kévin Ledanois
- Born: 13 July 1993 (age 33) Noisy-le-Sec, France
- Height: 1.81 m (5 ft 11 1/2 in)
- Weight: 67 kg (148 lb; 10 st 8 lb)

Cycling career
- Sport: Cycling
- Current team: Retired
- Disciplines: Road; Cyclo-cross
- Role: Rider

Amateur teams
- 2007–2010: Saint-Jean-de-Monts Vendée Cyclisme
- 2011: Team UC Nantes Atlantique Junior
- 2012–2013: Team UC Nantes Atlantique
- 2014: CC Nogent-sur-Oise
- 2014: Bretagne–Séché Environnement (stagiaire)

Professional team
- 2015–2024: Bretagne–Séché Environnement

Kévin Ledanois (born 13 July 1993) is a French former road cyclist, who competed as a professional from 2015 to August 2024. He is the son of the former French cyclist Yvon Ledanois.

On September 25, 2015, he won the under-23 road race at the 2015 UCI Road World Championships held in Richmond, Virginia. In July 2018, he was named in the start list for the Tour de France.

== Major results ==
2014
1st Tour du Jura
6th Overall Arctic Race of Norway
6th Overall Tour de Normandie
2015
1st Road race, UCI Under-23 Road World Championships
4th Paris–Camembert
9th Tro-Bro Léon
10th Road race, European Games
2016
3rd Classic Loire Atlantique
2017
9th Overall Tour de l'Ain
10th Polynormande
2018
Tour de France

Held after Stage 1

2019
7th Tour de Vendée
2020
4th Overall Tour du Limousin
7th Prueba Villafranca de Ordizia
2021
8th Trofeo Calvia

=== Grand Tour general classification results timeline ===
Grand Tour	2018	2019	2020	2021	2022	2023
Giro d'Italia	—	—	—	—	—	—
Tour de France	96	103	102	—	—	—
Vuelta a España	—	—	—	—	—	103

Legend
—	Did not compete
DNF	Did not finish
