= Dylan Hopkins (cyclist) =

Australian cyclist)

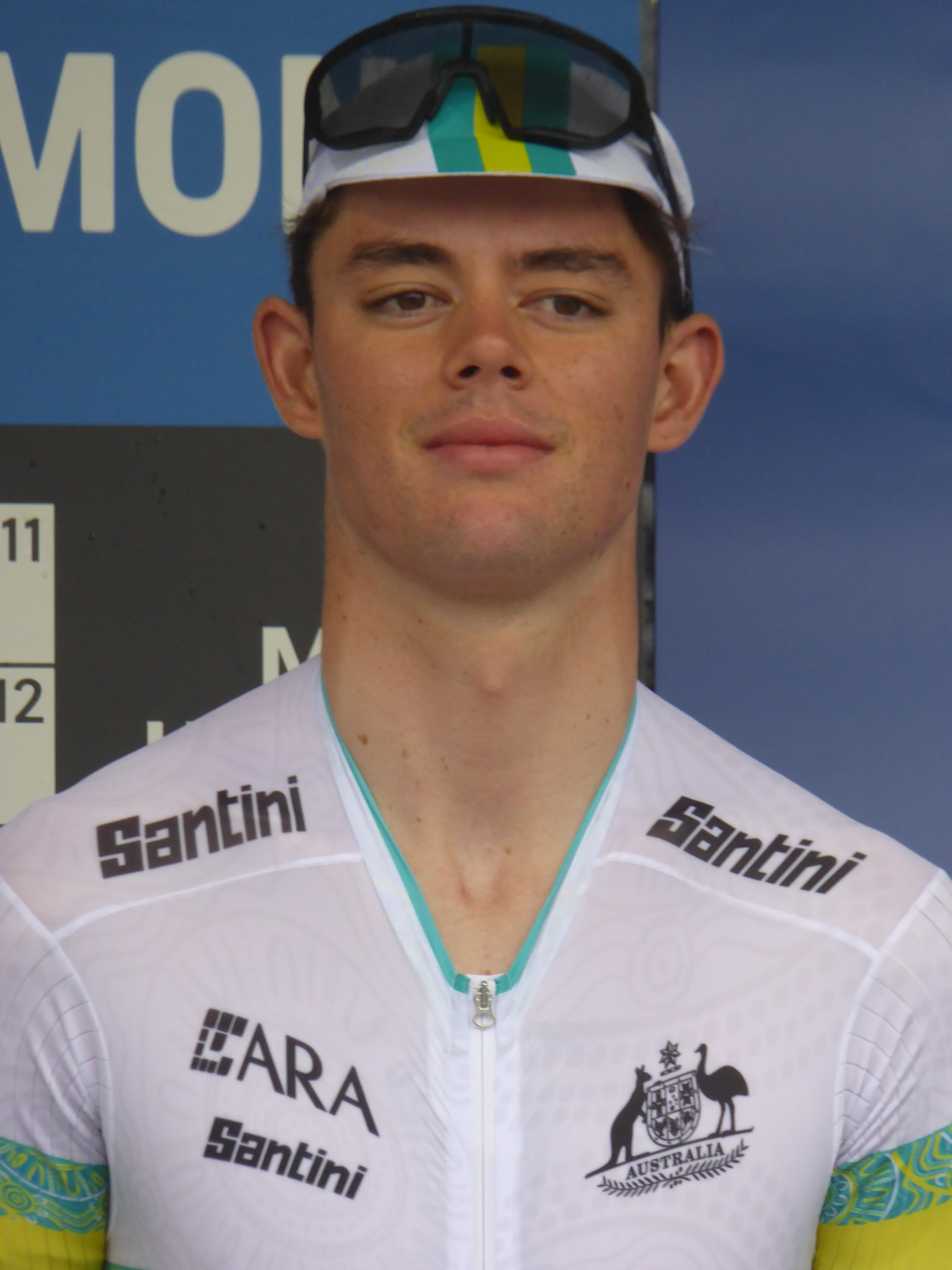
- Hopkins at the 2023 UCI Road World Championships

Personal information
- Born: 23 September 2001 (age 25) Canberra, Australia
- Height: 1.90 m (6 ft 3 in)
- Weight: 74 kg (163 lb)

Cycling career
- Sport: Cycling
- Current team: Roojai Insurance Winspace
- Discipline: Road
- Role: Rider

Amateur team
- 2018–2019: Phoenix Cycle Collective

Professional teams
- 2020–2024: Ljubljana Gusto Santic
- 2025–: Roojai Insurance

Dylan Hopkins (born 23 September 2001) is an Australian cyclist, who currently rides for UCI Continental team Roojai Insurance Winspace.

== Major results ==
2019
4th Road race, Oceania Junior Road Championships
4th Road race, National Junior Road Championships
2022
4th Trofeo Città di San Vendemiano
2023
2nd Overall Grand Prix Cycliste de Gemenc
5th Road race, National Under-23 Road Championships
Visegrad 4 Bicycle Race

5th Kerekparverseny
6th GP Slovakia

5th GP Goriška & Vipava Valley
8th GP Gorenjska
2024
1st Stage 1 Belgrade Banjaluka
4th National Criterium Championships
4th GP Slovakia, Visegrad 4 Bicycle Race
6th GP Brda-Collio
8th Overall Tour of Taihu Lake
8th GP Goriška & Vipava Valley
2025
1st Overall Tour de Gyeongnam

1st Mountains classification
1st Stage 1

2nd Overall Tour of Huangshan
4th Oita Urban Classic
5th Overall Tour of Thailand
2026
2nd Overall Grand Prix Jizzakh

1st Stage 1 (ITT)

5th Overall Tour de Taiwan
6th Road race, Oceania Road Championships
