= William Heffernan =

American novelist (born 1940)

- Born: August 22, 1940; New Haven, Connecticut, U.S.
- Died: December 4, 2020; Maryland, U.S.
- Occupation: Novelist

William Heffernan (born August 22, 1940) is an American novelist born in New Haven, Connecticut. Before becoming a novelist, Heffernan was an investigative reporter for the New York Daily News. Heffernan left journalism in 1978 after receiving his first book contract for the novel Broderick. He won the Heywood Broun Award twice, received the Robert F. Kennedy Journalism Award and has received a number of other local, state and regional honors. William Heffernan has received the Edgar Award, is a member of the Authors Guild and the Mystery Writers of America, and was once President of the International Association of Crime Writers. The film rights for The Dinosaur Club were sold to Warner Bros. in 1997 for $1 million.

== Works ==
- Broderick (1980)
- Caging the Raven (1981)
- The Corsican (1983)
- Acts of Contrition (1986)
- Blood Rose (a Paul Devlin series book) (1988)
- Ritual (a Paul Devlin series book) (1989)
- Corsican Honor (1991)
- Scarred (a Paul Devlin series book) (1992)
- Tarnished Blue (a Paul Devlin series book) (winner of the Edgar Award for best paperback original) (1993)
- Winter's Gold (a Paul Devlin series book) (1995)
- The Dinosaur Club (1997)
- Cityside (1997)
- Red Angel (a Paul Devlin series book) (1999)
- Beulah Hill (2000)
- Unholy Order (a Paul Devlin series book) (2000)
- A Time Gone By (2003)
- The Dead Detective (2010)
- When Johnny Came Marching Home (2012)
- The Scientology Murders (a Dead Detective series book) (2017)

== Translations ==
- A Time Gone By has been translated into Polish: Czas Przeszly, Wydawnictwo "Amber" Warsaw, 2004
