= Martin Laas =

Estonian cyclist (born 1993)

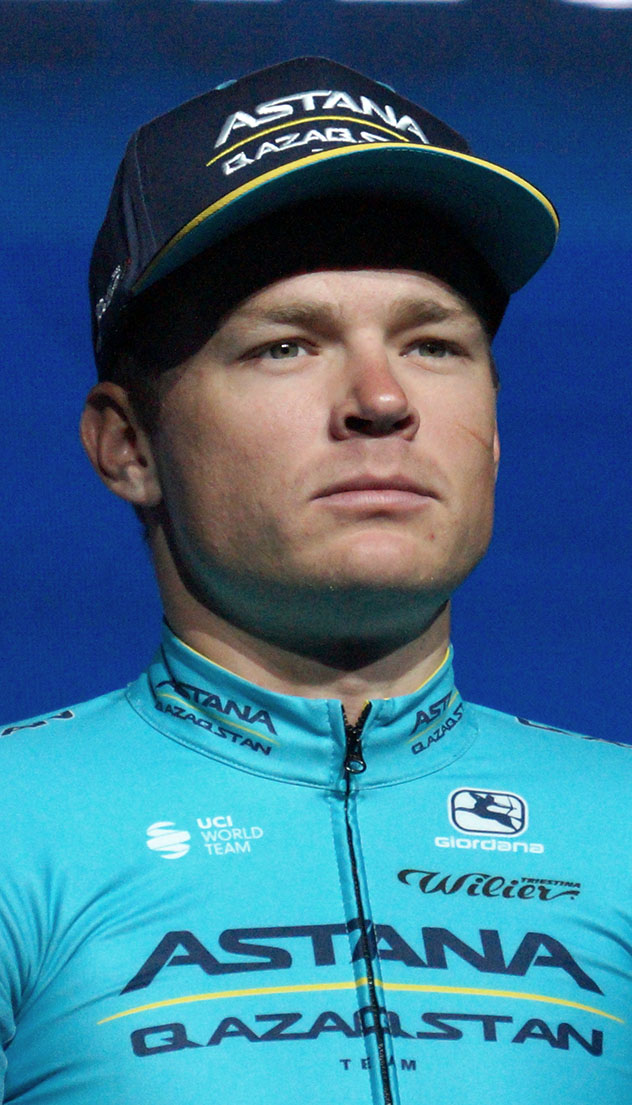
- Laas in 2023

Personal information
- Full name: Martin Laas
- Born: 15 September 1993 (age 33) Viljandi, Estonia
- Height: 1.76 m (5 ft 9 in)
- Weight: 74 kg (163 lb)

Cycling career
- Sport: Cycling
- Current team: Quick Pro Team
- Discipline: Road
- Role: Rider
- Rider type: Sprinter

Amateur team
- 2013–2015: Pro Immo Nicolas Roux

Professional teams
- 2015: Team Marseille 13 KTM (stagiaire)
- 2016–2017: Delko–Marseille Provence KTM
- 2018–2019: Team Illuminate
- 2020–2022: Bora–Hansgrohe
- 2023: Astana Qazaqstan Team
- 2024–: Ferei Quick-Panda Podium Mongolia Team

Martin Laas (born 15 September 1993) is an Estonian cyclist, who currently rides for UCI Continental team Quick Pro Team.

In 2023 he was a rider of UCI WorldTeam XDS Astana Team. In October 2020, he was named in the startlist for the 2020 Vuelta a España.

== Major results ==
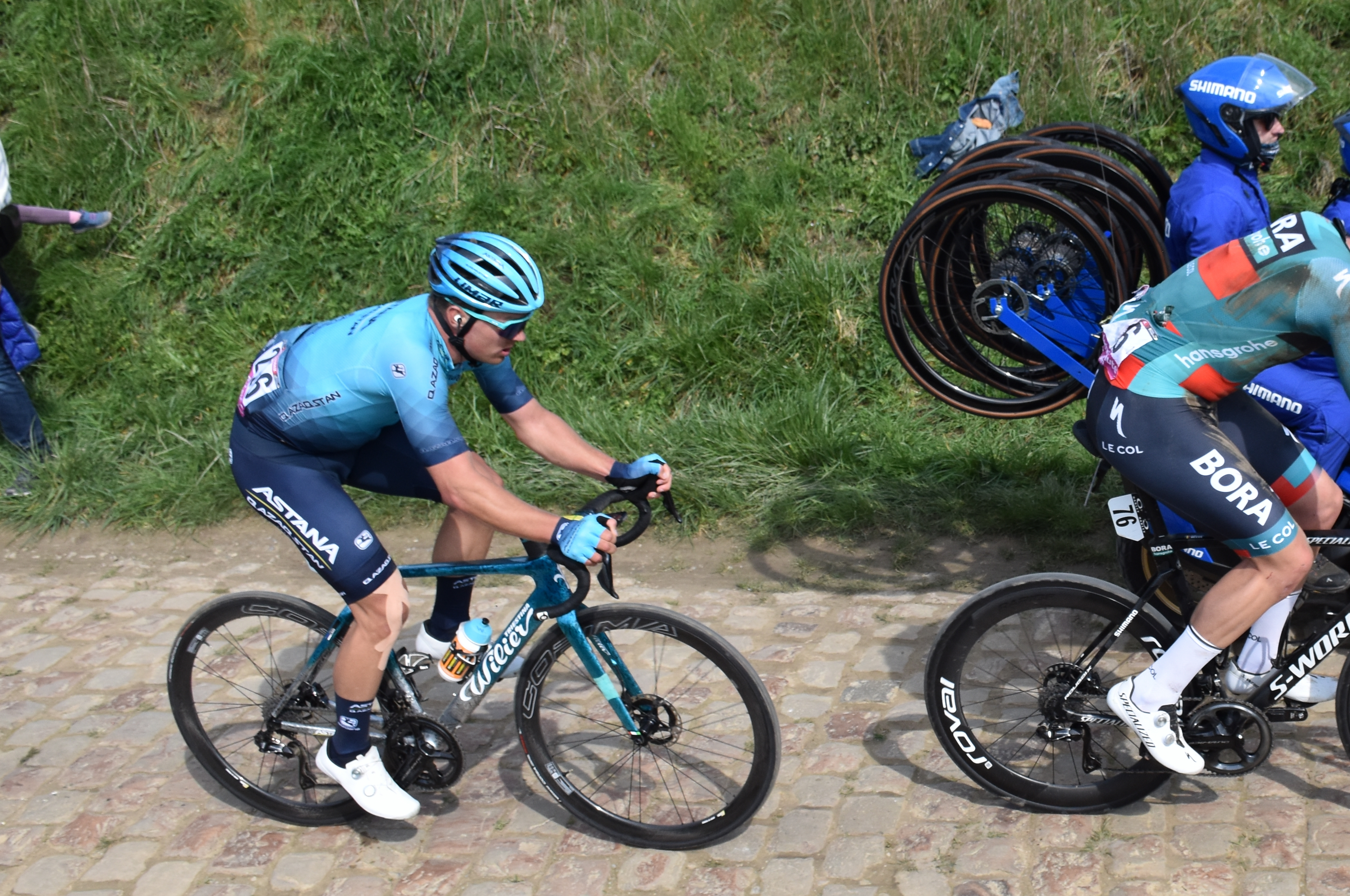
Laas at the 2023 Paris–Roubaix.

2013
3rd Time trial, National Under-23 Road Championships
3rd Riga Grand Prix
2014
1st Grand Prix de Lignac
4th Overall Baltic Chain Tour
2015
1st Overall Tour of Estonia

1st Points classification
1st Young rider classification
1st Stage 1

1st Stage 2 Tour du Loiret
6th Road race, UEC European Under-23 Road Championships
10th Overall Tour of Yancheng Coastal Wetlands
10th Coppa dei Laghi-Trofeo Almar
2017
4th Road race, National Road Championships
2018
Tour of Thailand

1st Points classification
1st Stages 4, 5 & 6

1st Stage 8 Tour of Japan
4th Overall Baltic Chain Tour

1st Stage 1

2019
Tour of Taiyuan

1st Points classification
1st Stages 2, 3, 5 & 6

Tour de Korea

1st Stages 2, 4 & 5

1st Stage 6 Tour of Thailand
2nd Grand Prix Minsk
4th Road race, National Road Championships
2020
Okolo Slovenska

1st Points classification
1st Stages 1a & 3

2021
1st Stage 2 Arctic Race of Norway
2nd Overall Tour of Estonia

1st Points classification
1st Stage 2

3rd Clásica de Almería
3rd Kampioenschap van Vlaanderen
2022
2nd Overall Baltic Chain Tour

1st Points classification
1st Stages 2 & 4

5th Road race, National Road Championships
2023
1st Overall Tour of Sakarya

1st Stage 2

2024
1st Overall Tour of Shanghai - New Cities

1st Points classification
1st Stage 2

1st Stages 1 & 3 Tour of Taihu Lake
1st Stage 2 Tour of Hainan
HTV Cup

1st Stages 4, 8, 10, 11, 13, 18, 22 & 25

Tour of Poyang Lake

1st Points classification
1st Stages 3, 8 & 9

1st Stages 4 & 5 Tour of Lithuania
Tour de Ijen

1st Points classification
1st Stage 2

1st Stage 2 Tour of Yellow River
5th Overall Trans-Himalaya Cycling Race

1st Stage 1

2025
1st Overall Tour of Lithuania

1st Points classification
1st Stages 1, 3 & 4

1st Stage 4 Tour of Magnificent Qinghai
1st Stage 2 Trans-Himalaya Cycling Race
7th Overall Yellow River Estuary Road Cycling Race

=== Grand Tour general classification results timeline ===
Grand Tour	2020	2021
Giro d'Italia	—	—
Tour de France	—	—
Vuelta a España	140	140

Legend
—	Did not compete
DNF	Did not finish
