= GP Goriška & Vipava Valley =

Race details
- Date: March
- Region: Nova Gorica, Slovenia
- Discipline: Road race
- Competition: UCI Europe Tour
- Type: Single-day

History
- First edition: 2022
- Editions: 3 (as of 2025)
- First winner: Fran Miholjević (CRO)
- Most wins: No repeat winners
- Most recent: Mattia Negrente (ITA)

GP Goriška & Vipava Valley is a single-day road bicycle race held annually in March in Nova Gorica, Slovenia. First held in 2022, the race is organized as a 1.2 event on the UCI Europe Tour. The race was known as the GP Vipava Valley & Crossborder Goriška for its inaugural edition before being renamed in 2023.

== Winners ==
Year	Country	Rider	Team
2022	Croatia	Fran Miholjević	Cycling Team Friuli ASD
2023	Czech Republic	Adam Ťoupalík	Elkov–Kasper
2024	Italy	Mattia Negrente	Astana Qazaqstan Development Team
2025	No race		
