= Karl Patrick Lauk =

Estonian cyclist (born 1997)

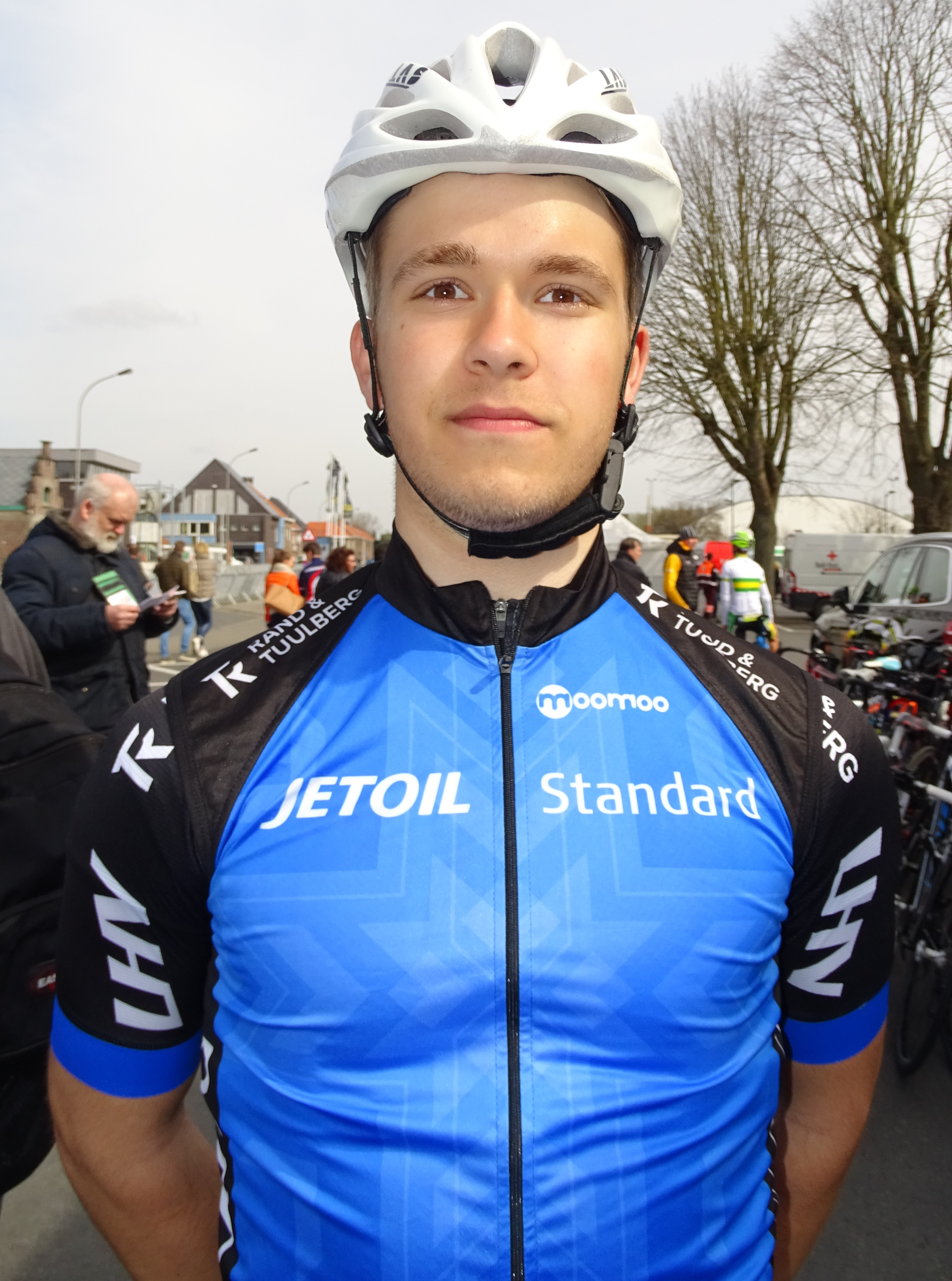
- Lauk in 2016

Personal information
- Full name: Karl Patrick Lauk
- Born: 9 January 1997 (age 29) Kuressaare, Estonia
- Height: 1.73 m (5 ft 8 in)
- Weight: 69 kg (152 lb)

Cycling career
- Sport: Cycling
- Current team: Quick Pro Team
- Discipline: Road
- Role: Rider
- Rider type: Sprinter; Puncheur

Amateur teams
- 2016–2018: Pro Immo Nicolas Roux
- 2020–2021: Pro Immo Nicolas Roux

Professional teams
- 2017: Astana (stagiaire)
- 2018: Fortuneo–Samsic (stagiaire)
- 2019: Équipe Continentale Groupama–FDJ
- 2022–2023: Bingoal Pauwels Sauces WB
- 2024: Huansheng–SCOM–Taishan Sport Cycling Team
- 2025–: Quick Pro Team

Major wins
- One-day races and Classics National Road Race Championships (2023)

Karl Patrick Lauk (born 9 January 1997 in Kuressaare) is an Estonian cyclist, who currently rides for UCI Continental team Quick Pro Team.

== Major results ==
2016
5th Time trial, National Road Championships
2017
1st Overall Tour of Estonia

1st Points classification
1st Young rider classification
1st Stage 1

National Road Championships

5th Time trial
5th Road race

2018
1st Mountains classification, Tour of Estonia
National Road Championships

3rd Road race
4th Time trial

2019
1st Stage 4 Rhône-Alpes Isère Tour
National Road Championships

2nd Time trial
5th Road race

4th Grand Prix de la ville de Nogent-sur-Oise
6th L'Etoile d'Or
2020
2nd Road race, National Road Championships
2021
1st Overall Tour of Estonia

1st Stage 1

1st Stage 3 International Tour of Rhodes
1st Grand Prix de la ville de Nogent-sur-Oise
1st Stage 7 Tour de la Guadeloupe
2nd Overall Baltic Chain Tour

1st Stage 2

2022
4th Overall ZLM Tour
2023
1st Road race, National Road Championships
2nd Road race, Island Games
9th Overall La Tropicale Amissa Bongo

1st Stage 6

2024
2nd Overall Tour of Estonia

1st Points classification
