= Oskar Nisu =

Estonian cyclist

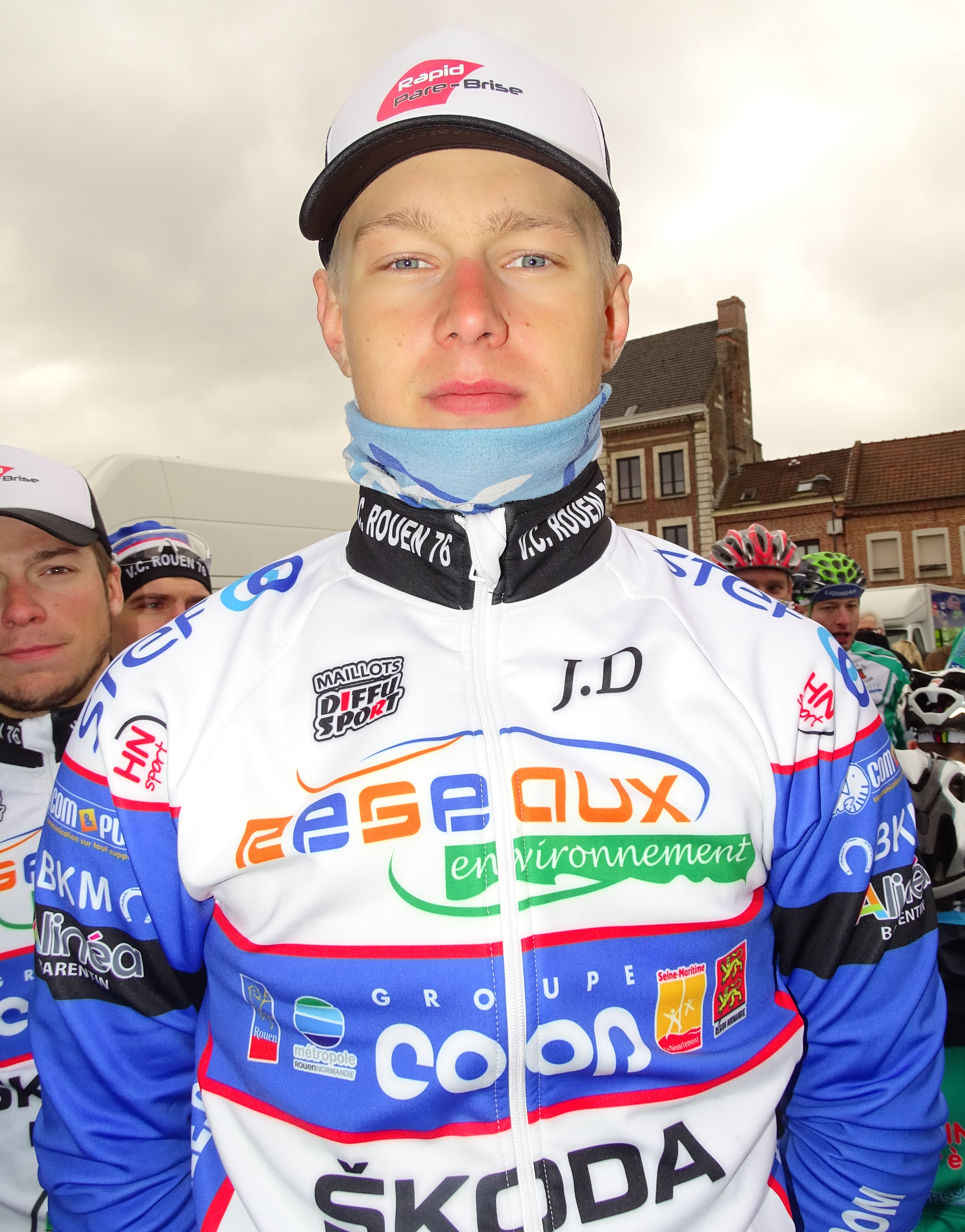
- Nisu at the 2016 Grand Prix de Lillers-Souvenir Bruno Comini

Personal information
- Born: 11 August 1994 (age 32) Randvere, Estonia
- Height: 1.88 m (6 ft 2 in)
- Weight: 84 kg (185 lb)

Cycling career
- Sport: Cycling
- Current team: Quick Pro Team
- Discipline: Road
- Role: Rider

Amateur teams
- 2012: CFC Spordiklubi
- 2013–2014: CC Villeneuve Saint-Germain
- 2015–2017: VC Rouen 76
- 2018–2019: Cycling Tartu
- 2022: Peloton

Professional teams
- 2019: Kunbao Sport Continental Cycling Team
- 2020–2021: EvoPro Racing
- 2023: Denver Disruptors
- 2024–: Ferei Quick-Panda Podium Mongolia Team

Oskar Nisu (born 11 August 1994) is an Estonian professional road cyclist, who currently rides for UCI Continental team Quick Pro Team. He competed in the road race at the 2021 UCI Road World Championships.

== Major results ==
2011
1st Road race, National Junior Road Championships
1st Overall Tour de la Région de Lódz

1st Stages 1 & 3

1st Stage 1 (TTT) Saaremaa Velotuur
2012
National Junior Road Championships

1st Road race
2nd Time trial

Tour de la Région de Lódz

1st Points classification
1st Stage 4

1st Stage 1 (TTT) Saaremaa Velotuur
2014
1st Time trial, National Under-23 Road Championships
National Road Championships

3rd Time trial
5th Road race

3rd Grand Prix de Beuvry-la-Forêt
2015
4th Time trial, National Road Championships
2016
4th Time trial, National Road Championships
2018
9th Overall Dookoła Mazowsza
2019
2nd Criterium, Island Games
3rd Time trial, National Road Championships
2020
9th Gooikse Pijl
2021
1st Grand Prix Michel Wuyts
2024
1st Stage 2 Tour de Ijen
National Road Championships

4th Time trial
5th Road race

7th Overall Tour of Estonia
8th Overall Tour of Lithuania
