= 2024 in cycling =

The 2024 in cycling results is given as follows:

== Cycle ball ==
- 2024 UCI Cycle–ball World Cup Calendar here.

=== World Championships ===
- October 25–27: 2024 UCI Indoor Cycling World Championships in (Germany) Bremen

=== 2024 UCI Cycle–ball World Cup ===
- April 13: World Cup #1 in (Japan) Kobe
  - Winners: (Switzerland) Rafael Artho / Björn Vogel
- May 4: World Cup #2 in (Switzerland) Mosnang
  - Winners: (Germany) Raphael Kopp / Bernd Mlady
- August 31: World Cup #3 in (Germany) Hannover
  - Winners: (Germany) Raphael Kopp / Bernd Mlady
- September 7: World Cup #4 in (Germany) Darmstadt
  - Winners: (Austria) Stefan Feuerstein / Patrick Schnetzer
- September 21: World Cup #5 in (Germany) Denkendorf
- October 12: World Cup #6 in (Switzerland) Altdorf
- November 9: World Cup #7 in (Austria) St. Pölten
- November 23: World Cup #8 in (France) Dorlisheim
- December 7: World Cup Final in (Germany) Ailingen

== Cycling – BMX ==
=== World & Continental Championships ===
- May 29 – June 2: 2024 UEC BMX Racing European Championships in (Italy) Verona
  - Winners: (France) Arthur Pilard (m) / (Switzerland) Zoé Claessens (w)
- September 20–21: 2024 UEC BMX Freestyle European Championships in (Switzerland) Cadenazzo
- December 17–21: 2024 UCI Urban Cycling World Championships in (United Arab Emirates) Abu Dhabi

=== 2024 UCI BMX Freestyle World Cup ===
- February 22 – 25: World Cup #1 in (Japan) Enoshima
  - Park winners: (France) Anthony Jeanjean (m) / (United States) Hannah Roberts (w)
  - Flatland winners: (Japan) Yu Katagiri (m) / (Japan) Nina Suzuki (w)
- May 8 – 12: World Cup #2 in (France) Montpellier
  - Park winners: (France) Anthony Jeanjean (m) / (France) Laury Perez (w)
  - Flatland winners: (Japan) Yu Shoji (m) / (Japan) Nina Suzuki (w)
- October 17 – 20: World Cup #3 in (China) Shanghai

=== 2024 UCI BMX Racing World Cup ===
- February 10 – 11: World Cup #1 & #2 in (New Zealand) Rotorua
  - Men's winners: (France) Romain Mahieu (#1) / (France) Joris Daudet (#2)
  - Women's winners: (Australia) Saya Sakakibara (2 times)
- February 24 – 25: World Cup #3 & #4 in (Australia) Brisbane
  - Men's Elite winners: (Australia) Izaac Kennedy (#1) / (United Kingdom) Kye Whyte (#2)
  - Women's Elite winners: (Switzerland) Zoé Claessens (2 times)
- April 27 – 28: World Cup #5 & #6 in (United States) Tulsa
  - Men's Elite winners: (Netherlands) Niek Kimmann (2 times)
  - Women's Elite winners: (Australia) Saya Sakakibara (2 times)
- June 22 – 23: World Cup #7 & #8 in (Netherlands) Papendal
  - Event was cancelled
- Overall winners: (Australia) Izaac Kennedy (m) / (Australia) Saya Sakakibara (w)

=== 2024 BMX European Cup ===
- March 9 – 10: European Cup #1 & #2 in (France) Sarrians
  - #1 was cancelled
  - Winners: (United Kingdom) Kye Whyte (m) / (Denmark) Malene Kejlstrup (w)
- March 30 – April 1: European Cup #3 & #4 in (Belgium) Heusden-Zolder
  - Men's winners: (United Kingdom) Kye Whyte (2 times)
  - Women's winners: (Denmark) Malene Kejlstrup (2 times)
- April 13 – 14: European Cup #5 & #6 in (Czech Republic) Benátky nad Jizerou
  - Men's winners: (Belgium) Ruben Gommers (2 times)
  - Women's winners: (Netherlands) Judy Baauw (#1) / (Netherlands) Indy Scheepers (#2)
- June 15 – 16: European Cup #7 & #8 in (Netherlands) Tiel
  - Men's winners: (France) Eddy Clerté (#1) / (Switzerland) Loris Aeberhard (#2)
  - Women's winners: (Netherlands) Judy Baauw (2 times)
- July 13 – 14: European Cup #9 & #10 in (Latvia) Valmiera
  - Men's winners: (France) Eddy Clerté (#1) / (Switzerland) Loris Aeberhard (#2)
  - Women's winners: (Netherlands) Judy Baauw (2 times)
- September 7 – 8: European Cup #11 & #12 in (Belgium) Ravels
  - Men's winners: (France) Eddy Clerté (2 times)
  - Women's winners: (Netherlands) Indy Scheepers (2 times)

== Cycling – Cross ==
- 2023–24 UCI Cyclocross Calendar here.

=== World Championships ===
- February 2 – 4: 2024 UCI Cyclo-cross World Championships in (Czech Republic) Tábor
  - Elite race winners: (Netherlands) Mathieu van der Poel (m) / (Netherlands) Fem van Empel (f)
  - U23 race winners: (Netherlands) Tibor Del Grosso (m) / (United Kingdom) Zoe Bäckstedt (f)
  - Junior race winners: (Italy) Stefano Viezzi (m) / (France) Célia Gery
  - Mixed relay winners: France

=== 2023–24 UCI Cyclo-cross World Cup ===
- October 15, 2023: UCI Cyclo-cross World Cup #1 in (United States) Waterloo
  - Winners: (Belgium) Thibau Nys (m) / (Netherlands) Fem van Empel (f)
- October 29, 2023: UCI Cyclo-cross World Cup #2 in (Belgium) Maasmechelen
  - Winners: (Netherlands) Lars van der Haar (m) / (Netherlands) Fem van Empel (f)
- November 12, 2023: UCI Cyclo-cross World Cup #3 in (Belgium) Dendermonde
  - Winners: (Netherlands) Pim Ronhaar (m) / (Netherlands) Ceylin del Carmen Alvarado (f)
- November 19, 2023: UCI Cyclo-cross World Cup #4 in (France) Troyes
  - Winners: (Belgium) Eli Iserbyt (m) / (Netherlands) Ceylin del Carmen Alvarado (f)
  - U23 winner: (Netherlands) Tibor Del Grosso
  - Juniors winners: (Italy) Stefano Viezzi (m) / (United Kingdom) Cat Ferguson
- November 26, 2023: UCI Cyclo-cross World Cup #5 in (Republic of Ireland) Dublin
  - Winners: (Netherlands) Pim Ronhaar (m) / (Netherlands) Lucinda Brand (f)
  - U23 winner: (Netherlands) Tibor Del Grosso
  - Juniors winners: (Italy) Stefano Viezzi (m) / (France) Célia Gery
- December 3, 2023: UCI Cyclo-cross World Cup #6 in (France) Flamanville
  - Winners: (Belgium) Eli Iserbyt (m) / (Netherlands) Lucinda Brand (f)
- December 10, 2023: UCI Cyclo-cross World Cup #7 in (Italy) Val di Sole
  - Winners: (Netherlands) Joris Nieuwenhuis (m) / (Netherlands) Manon Bakker (f)
- December 17, 2023: UCI Cyclo-cross World Cup #8 in (Belgium) Namur
  - Winners: (United Kingdom) Tom Pidcock (m) / (Netherlands) Ceylin del Carmen Alvarado (f)
  - U23 winner: (Belgium) Emiel Verstrynge
  - Juniors winners: (France) Aubin Sparfel (m) / (France) Célia Gery
- December 23, 2023: UCI Cyclo-cross World Cup #9 in (Belgium) Antwerp
  - Winners: (Netherlands) Mathieu van der Poel (m) / (Netherlands) Fem van Empel (f)
  - U23 winner: (Netherlands) Tibor Del Grosso
  - Juniors winners: (France) Aubin Sparfel (m) / (United Kingdom) Cat Ferguson
- December 26, 2023: UCI Cyclo-cross World Cup #10 in (Belgium) Gavere
  - Winners: (Netherlands) Mathieu van der Poel (m) / (Netherlands) Puck Pieterse (f)
- December 30, 2023: UCI Cyclo-cross World Cup #11 in (Netherlands) Hulst
  - Winners: (Netherlands) Mathieu van der Poel (m) / (Netherlands) Puck Pieterse (f)
- January 7: UCI Cyclo-cross World Cup #12 in (Belgium) Zonhoven
  - Winners: (Netherlands) Mathieu van der Poel (m) / (Netherlands) Puck Pieterse (f)
- January 21: UCI Cyclo-cross World Cup #13 in (Spain) Benidorm
  - Winners: (Belgium) Wout van Aert (m) / (Netherlands) Fem van Empel (f)
  - U23 winner: (Belgium) Emiel Verstrynge
  - Juniors winners: (France) Aubin Sparfel (m) / (France) Célia Gery
- January 28: UCI Cyclo-cross World Cup #14 in (Netherlands) Hoogerheide (final)
  - Winners: (Netherlands) Mathieu van der Poel (m) / (Netherlands) Fem van Empel (f)
  - U23 winner: (Netherlands) Tibor Del Grosso
  - Juniors winners: (Italy) Stefano Viezzi (m) / (Slovakia) Viktória Chladonová
- Overall winners:
  - Elite winners: (Belgium) Eli Iserbyt (m) / (Netherlands) Ceylin del Carmen Alvarado (f)
  - U23 winner: (Netherlands) Tibor del Grosso
  - Junior winners: (Italy) Stefano Viezzi (m) / (France) Célia Gery (f)

== Cycling – Mountain Bike ==
- Full 2024 MTB Events Calendar here.

=== World Championships ===
- February 10–11: 2024 UCI Snow Bike World Championships in (France) Châtel
  - Snow bike Dual slalom winners: (France) Pierre Thevenard (m) / (Switzerland) Lisa Baumann (w)
  - Snow bike Super G winners: (France) Pierre Thevenard (m) / (France) Morgane Such (w)
- July 13: 2024 UCI Mountain Bike Eliminator World Championships in (Germany) Aalen
  - Winners: (Netherlands) Jeroen van Eck (m) / (Italy) Gaia Tormena (w)
- August 28 – September 1: 2024 UCI Mountain Bike World Championships in (Andorra) Vallnord
  - XCO winners: (South Africa) Alan Hatherly (m) / (Netherlands) Puck Pieterse (w)
  - XCC winners: (France) Victor Koretzky (m) / (United Kingdom) Evie Richards (w)
  - E-MTB winners: (France) Jérôme Gilloux (m) / (Germany) Sofia Wiedenroth (w)
  - Downhill winners: (France) Loris Vergier (m) / (Austria) Valentina Höll (w)
- September 21–22: 2024 UCI Mountain Bike Marathon World Championships in (United States) Snowshoe
  - Winners: (Denmark) Simon Andreassen (m) / (Austria) Mona Mitterwallner (w)

=== 2024 UCI Mountain Bike World Cup ===
- April 12–14: World Cup #1 in (Brazil) Mairiporã
  - XCC winners: (New Zealand) Sam Gaze (m) / (United Kingdom) Evie Richards (f)
  - XCO winners: (United States) Christopher Blevins (m) / (Sweden) Jenny Rissveds (f)
- April 19–21: World Cup #2 in (Brazil) Araxá
  - XCC winners: (France) Victor Koretzky (m) / (United States) Haley Batten (f)
  - XCO winners: (Denmark) Simon Andreassen (m) / (United States) Haley Batten (f)
- May 3–5: World Cup #3 in (United Kingdom) Fort William
  - Downhill winners: (France) Loïc Bruni (m) / (Austria) Valentina Höll (f)
- May 10–12: World Cup #4 in (Italy) Finale Outdoor Region
  - Enduro winners: (United States) Richard Rude Jr. (m) / (Australia) Ryan Gilchrist (f)
- May 17–19: World Cup #5 in (Poland) Bielsko-Biała
  - Downhill winners: (Republic of Ireland) Ronan Dunne (m) / (France) Marine Cabirou (f)
  - Enduro winners: (New Zealand) Charles Murray (m) / (France) Isabeau Courdurier (f)
- May 24–26: World Cup #6 in (Czech Republic) Nové Město na Moravě
  - XCC winners: (France) Victor Koretzky (m) / (Switzerland) Alessandra Keller (f)
  - XCO winners: (United Kingdom) Tom Pidcock (m) / (France) Pauline Ferrand-Prévot (f)
  - Marathon winners: (Italy) Fabian Rabensteiner (m) / (Namibia) Vera Looser (f)
- June 7–9: World Cup #7 in (Austria) Saalfelden
  - Downhill winners: (France) Loïc Bruni (m) / (Austria) Valentina Höll (f)
  - Enduro winners: (United States) Richard Rude Jr. (m) / (France) Isabeau Courdurier (f)
- June 14–16: World Cup #8 in (Italy) Val di Sole
  - XCC winners: (New Zealand) Sam Gaze (m) / (Netherlands) Puck Pieterse (f)
  - XCO winners: (Switzerland) Nino Schurter (m) / (France) Pauline Ferrand-Prévot (f)
  - Downhill winners: (France) Amaury Pierron (m) / (United Kingdom) Tahnée Seagrave (f)
- June 28 – July 7: World Cup #9 in (France) Haute-Savoie
  - XCC winners: (South Africa) Alan Hatherly (m) / (Switzerland) Alessandra Keller (w)
  - XCO winners: (South Africa) Alan Hatherly (m) / (Netherlands) Puck Pieterse (w)
  - Downhill winners: (France) Amaury Pierron (m) / (Italy) Eleonora Farina (w)
- July 12–14: World Cup #10 in (Switzerland) Bellwald
- August 16–18: World Cup #11 in TBD
- September 6–8: World Cup #12 in (France) Loudenvielle
  - Downhill winners: (France) Benoît Coulanges (m) / (France) Myriam Nicole (w)
- September 27–29: World Cup #13 in (United States) Lake Placid
- October 4–6: World Cup #14 in (Canada) Mont-Sainte-Anne

=== 2024 Crankworx World Tour ===
- March 16 – 24: CWT in (New Zealand) Rotorua
- May 22 – 26: CWT in (Australia) Cairns
- June 12 – 16: CWT in (Austria) Innsbruck
- July 19 – 28: CWT in (Canada) Whistler

== Cycling – Para-cycling ==
=== International Championships ===
- March 20–24: 2024 UCI Para-cycling Track World Championships in (Brazil) Rio de Janeiro
- August 29 – September 7: 2024 Summer Paralympics in (France) Paris

=== 2024 UCI Para-cycling Road World Cup ===
- January 13–17: World Cup in (Australia) Adelaide
- May 2–5: World Cup in (Belgium) Ostend
- May 16–19: World Cup in (Italy) Maniago

== Cycling – Road ==
=== 2024 UCI World Tour ===
(Monuments and Grand Tours in bold)

- January 16–21: 2024 Tour Down Under in Australia
  - Winner: (United Kingdom) Stephen Williams ( Israel–Premier Tech)
- January 28: 2024 Cadel Evans Great Ocean Road Race in Australia
  - Winner: (New Zealand) Laurence Pithie ( (France) Groupama–FDJ)
- February 19–25: 2024 UAE Tour in United Arab Emirates
  - Winner: (Belgium) Lennert Van Eetvelt ( (Belgium) Lotto–Dstny)
- February 24: 2024 Omloop Het Nieuwsblad in Belgium
  - Winner: (Slovenia) Jan Tratnik ( (Netherlands) Visma–Lease a Bike)
- March 2: 2024 Strade Bianche in Italy
  - Winner: (Slovenia) Tadej Pogačar ( (United Arab Emirates) UAE Team Emirates)
- March 3–10: 2024 Paris–Nice in France
  - Winner: (United States) Matteo Jorgenson ( (Netherlands) Visma–Lease a Bike)
- March 4–10: 2024 Tirreno–Adriatico in Italy
  - Winner: (Denmark) Jonas Vingegaard ( (Netherlands) Visma–Lease a Bike)
- March 16: **2024 Milan–San Remo** in Italy
  - Winner: (Belgium) Jasper Philipsen ( (Belgium) Alpecin–Deceuninck)
- March 18–24: 2024 Volta a Catalunya in Spain
  - Winner: (Slovenia) Tadej Pogačar ( (United Arab Emirates) UAE Team Emirates)
- March 20: 2024 Classic Brugge–De Panne in Belgium
  - Winner: (Belgium) Jasper Philipsen ( (Belgium) Alpecin–Deceuninck)
- March 22: 2024 E3 Saxo Classic in Belgium
  - Winner: (Netherlands) Mathieu van der Poel ( (Belgium) Alpecin–Deceuninck)
- March 24: 2024 Gent–Wevelgem in Belgium
  - Winner: (Denmark) Mads Pedersen ( (United States) Lidl–Trek)
- March 27: 2024 Dwars door Vlaanderen in Belgium
  - Winner: (United States) Matteo Jorgenson ( (Netherlands) Visma–Lease a Bike)
- March 31: **2024 Tour of Flanders** in Belgium
  - Winner: (Netherlands) Mathieu van der Poel ( (Belgium) Alpecin–Deceuninck)
- April 1–6: 2024 Tour of the Basque Country in Spain
  - Winner: (Spain) Juan Ayuso ( (United Arab Emirates) UAE Team Emirates)
- April 7: **2024 Paris–Roubaix** in France
  - Winner: (Netherlands) Mathieu van der Poel ( (Belgium) Alpecin–Deceuninck)
- April 14: 2024 Amstel Gold Race in the Netherlands
  - Winner: (United Kingdom) Tom Pidcock ( (United Kingdom) INEOS Grenadiers)
- April 17: 2024 La Flèche Wallonne in Belgium
  - Winner: (United Kingdom) Stephen Williams ( Israel–Premier Tech)
- April 21: **2024 Liège–Bastogne–Liège** in Belgium
  - Winner: (Slovenia) Tadej Pogačar ( (United Arab Emirates) UAE Team Emirates)
- April 23–28: 2024 Tour de Romandie in Switzerland
  - Winner: (Spain) Carlos Rodríguez ( (United Kingdom) INEOS Grenadiers)
- May 1: 2024 Eschborn–Frankfurt in Germany
  - Winner: (Belgium) Maxim Van Gils ( (Belgium) Lotto–Dstny)
- May 4–26: **2024 Giro d'Italia** in Italy
  - Winner: (Slovenia) Tadej Pogačar ( (United Arab Emirates) UAE Team Emirates)
- June 2–9: 2024 Critérium du Dauphiné in France
  - Winner: (Slovenia) Primoź Roglić
- June 9–16: 2024 Tour de Suisse in Switzerland
  - Winner: (United Kingdom) Adam Yates ( (United Arab Emirates) UAE Team Emirates)
- June 29–July 21: **2024 Tour de France** in France
  - Winner: (Slovenia) Tadej Pogačar ( (United Arab Emirates) UAE Team Emirates)
- August 10: 2024 Clásica de San Sebastián in Spain
  - Winner: (Switzerland) Marc Hirschi ( (United Arab Emirates) UAE Team Emirates)
- August 12–18: 2024 Tour de Pologne in Poland
  - Winner: (Denmark) Jonas Vingegaard ( (Netherlands) Visma–Lease a Bike)
- August 17–September 8: **2024 Vuelta a España** in Spain
  - Winner: (Slovenia) Primož Roglič ( (Germany) Bora–Hansgrohe)
- August 25: 2024 Bretagne Classic Ouest-France in France
  - Winner: (Switzerland) Marc Hirschi ( (United Arab Emirates) UAE Team Emirates)
- August 28–September 1: 2024 Renewi Tour in Belgium and the Netherlands
  - Winner: (Belgium) Tim Wellens ( (United Arab Emirates) UAE Team Emirates)
- September 8: 2024 Hamburg Cyclassics in Germany
  - Winner: (Netherlands) Olav Kooij ( (Netherlands) Visma–Lease a Bike)
- September 13: 2024 Grand Prix Cycliste de Québec in Canada
  - Winner: (Australia) Michael Matthews ( (Australia) Team Jayco–AlUla)
- September 15: 2024 Grand Prix Cycliste de Montréal in Canada
  - Winner: (Slovenia) Tadej Pogačar ( (United Arab Emirates) UAE Team Emirates)
- October 12: **2024 Il Lombardia** in Italy
  - Winner: (Slovenia) Tadej Pogačar ( (United Arab Emirates) UAE Team Emirates)
- October 15–20: 2024 Tour of Guangxi in China
  - Winner: (Belgium) Lennert Van Eetvelt ( (Belgium) Lotto–Dstny)

=== 2024 UCI ProSeries ===
- January 31–February 4: 2024 Volta a la Comunitat Valenciana in Spain
  - Winner: (United States) Brandon McNulty ( (United Arab Emirates) UAE Team Emirates)
- February 10: 2024 Figueira Champions Classic in Portugal
  - Winner: (Belgium) Remco Evenepoel ( (Belgium) Soudal–Quick-Step)
- February 10–14: 2024 Tour of Oman in Oman
  - Winner: (United Kingdom) Adam Yates ( (United Arab Emirates) UAE Team Emirates)
- February 11: 2024 Clásica de Almería in Spain
  - Winner: (Netherlands) Olav Kooij ( (Netherlands) Visma–Lease a Bike)
- February 14–18: 2024 Volta ao Algarve in Portugal
  - Winner: (Belgium) Remco Evenepoel ( (Belgium) Soudal–Quick-Step)
- February 14–18: 2024 Vuelta a Andalucía in Spain
  - Winner: (Belgium) Maxim Van Gils ( (Belgium) Lotto–Dstny)
- February 24: 2024 Faun-Ardèche Classic in France
  - Winner: (Spain) Juan Ayuso ( (United Arab Emirates) UAE Team Emirates)
- February 25: 2024 Kuurne–Brussels–Kuurne in Belgium
  - Winner: (Belgium) Wout van Aert ( (Netherlands) Visma–Lease a Bike)
- February 25: 2024 Faun Drôme Classic in France
  - Winner: (Switzerland) Marc Hirschi ( (United Arab Emirates) UAE Team Emirates)
- February 28: 2024 Trofeo Laigueglia in Italy
  - Winner: (France) Lenny Martinez ( (France) Groupama–FDJ)
- March 13: 2024 Milano–Torino in Italy
  - Winner: (Italy) Alberto Bettiol ( (United States) EF Education–EasyPost)
- March 13: 2024 Nokere Koerse in Belgium
  - Winner: (Belgium) Tim Merlier ( (Belgium) Soudal–Quick-Step)
- March 14: 2024 Grand Prix de Denain in France
  - Winner: (Germany) Jannik Steimle ( (Switzerland) Q36.5 Pro Cycling Team)
- March 15: 2024 Bredene Koksijde Classic in Belgium
  - Winner: (Italy) Luca Mozzato ( (France) Arkéa–B&B Hotels)
- March 30: 2024 GP Miguel Induráin in Spain
  - Winner: (United States) Brandon McNulty ( (United Arab Emirates) UAE Team Emirates)
- April 3: 2024 Scheldeprijs in Belgium
  - Winner: (Belgium) Tim Merlier ( (Belgium) Soudal–Quick-Step)
- April 10: 2024 Brabantse Pijl in Belgium
  - Winner: (France) Benoît Cosnefroy ( (France) Decathlon–AG2R La Mondiale)
- April 15–19: 2024 Tour of the Alps in Italy
  - Winner: (Spain) Juan Pedro López ( (United States) Lidl–Trek)
- April 21–28: 2024 Presidential Tour of Turkey in Turkey
  - Winner: (Netherlands) Frank van den Broek ( (Netherlands) Team dsm–firmenich PostNL)
- May 4: 2024 Grand Prix du Morbihan in France
  - Winner: (France) Benoît Cosnefroy ( (France) Decathlon–AG2R La Mondiale)
- May 5: 2024 Tro-Bro Léon in France
  - Winner: (Belgium) Arnaud De Lie ( (Belgium) Lotto–Dstny)
- May 8–12: 2024 Tour de Hongrie in Hungary
  - Winner: (Belgium) Thibau Nys ( (United States) Lidl–Trek)
- May 14–19: 2024 Four Days of Dunkirk in France
  - Winner: (Republic of Ireland) Sam Bennett ( (France) Decathlon–AG2R La Mondiale)
- May 23–26: 2024 Boucles de la Mayenne in France
  - Winner: (Italy) Alberto Bettiol ( (United States) EF Education–EasyPost)
- May 23–26: 2024 Tour of Norway in Norway
  - Winner: (France) Axel Laurance ( (Belgium) Alpecin–Deceuninck)
- May 29: 2024 Circuit Franco–Belge in Belgium
  - Winner: (Eritrea) Biniam Girmay ( (Belgium) Intermarché–Wanty)
- June 2: 2024 Brussels Cycling Classic in Belgium
  - Winner: (Norway) Jonas Abrahamsen ( (Norway) Uno-X Mobility)
- June 8: 2024 Dwars door het Hageland in Belgium
  - Winner: (Belgium) Gianni Vermeersch ( (Belgium) Alpecin–Deceuninck)
- June 12–16: 2024 Tour of Belgium in Belgium
  - Winner: (Norway) Søren Wærenskjold ( (Norway) Uno-X Mobility)
- June 12–16: 2024 Tour of Slovenia in Slovenia
  - Winner: (Italy) Giovanni Aleotti ( (Germany) Bora–Hansgrohe)
- July 7–14: 2024 Tour of Qinghai Lake in China
  - Winner: (Ecuador) Jefferson Alveiro Cepeda ( (Spain) Caja Rural–Seguros RGA)
- July 22–26: 2024 Tour de Wallonie in Belgium
  - Winner: (Italy) Matteo Trentin ( (Switzerland) Tudor Pro Cycling Team)
- August 5–9: 2024 Vuelta a Burgos in Spain
  - Winner: (United States) Sepp Kuss ( (Netherlands) Visma–Lease a Bike)
- August 8–11: 2024 Arctic Race of Norway in Norway
  - Winner: (Denmark) Magnus Cort ( (Norway) Uno-X Mobility)
- August 14–18: 2024 Danmark Rundt in Denmark
  - Winner: (Belgium) Arnaud De Lie ( (Belgium) Lotto–Dstny)
- August 21–25: 2024 Deutschland Tour in Germany
  - Winner: (Denmark) Mads Pedersen ( (United States) Lidl–Trek)
- September 1: 2024 Maryland Cycling Classic in the United States
  - Cancelled
- September 1–8: 2024 Tour of Britain in Great Britain
  - Winner: (United Kingdom) Stephen Williams ( Israel–Premier Tech)
- September 8: 2024 GP Industria & Artigianato di Larciano in Italy
  - Winner: (Switzerland) Marc Hirschi ( (United Arab Emirates) UAE Team Emirates)
- September 8: 2024 Grand Prix de Fourmies in France
  - Winner: (Netherlands) Arvid de Kleijn ( (Switzerland) Tudor Pro Cycling Team)
- September 12: 2024 Coppa Sabatini in Italy
  - Winner: (Switzerland) Marc Hirschi ( (United Arab Emirates) UAE Team Emirates)
- September 18: 2024 Grand Prix de Wallonie in Belgium
  - Winner: (Spain) Roger Adrià ( (Germany) Red Bull–Bora–Hansgrohe)
- September 18–22: 2024 Tour de Luxembourg in Luxembourg
  - Winner: (Italy) Antonio Tiberi ( Team Bahrain Victorious)
- September 21: 2024 Super 8 Classic in Belgium
  - Winner: (Italy) Filippo Baroncini ( (United Arab Emirates) UAE Team Emirates)
- September 29–October 6: 2024 Tour de Langkawi in Malaysia
  - Winner: (United Kingdom) Max Poole ( (Netherlands) Team dsm–firmenich PostNL)
- October 3: 2024 Münsterland Giro in Germany
  - Winner: (Belgium) Jasper Philipsen ( (Belgium) Alpecin–Deceuninck)
- October 5: 2024 Giro dell'Emilia in Italy
  - Winner: (Slovenia) Tadej Pogačar ( (United Arab Emirates) UAE Team Emirates)
- October 6: 2024 Paris–Tours in France
  - Winner: (France) Christophe Laporte ( (Netherlands) Visma–Lease a Bike)
- October 7: 2024 Coppa Bernocchi in Italy
  - Winner: (Belgium) Stan Van Tricht ( (Belgium) Alpecin–Deceuninck)
- October 8: 2024 Tre Valli Varesine in Italy
  - Race stopped and cancelled
- October 10: 2024 Gran Piemonte in Italy
  - Winner: (United States) Neilson Powless ( (United States) EF Education–EasyPost)
- October 10–13: 2024 Tour of Taihu Lake in China
  - Winner: (Netherlands) Jelte Krijnsen ( (Netherlands) VolkerWessels Women Cyclingteam)
- October 16: 2024 Giro del Veneto in Italy
  - Winner: (New Zealand) Corbin Strong ( Israel–Premier Tech)
- October 20: 2024 Japan Cup in Japan
  - Winner: (United States) Neilson Powless ( (United States) EF Education–EasyPost)
- October 20: 2024 Veneto Classic in Italy
  - Winner: (Denmark) Magnus Cort ( (Norway) Uno-X Mobility)

=== 2024 Asian Road Cycling Championships ===
- June 6–12: 2024 Asian Road Cycling Championships in Kazakhstan
  - Individual road race winners: (South Korea) Kim Eu-ro (m) / (South Korea) Song Min-ji (f)
  - Individual time trial winners: (Kazakhstan) Yevgeniy Fedorov (m) / (Uzbekistan) Olga Zabelinskaya (f)
  - Team ewlay winners: Kazakhstan

== Cycling – Track ==
=== World & Continental Championships ===
- January 10–14: 2024 UEC European Track Championships in Apeldoorn
  - Sprint winners: (Netherlands) Harrie Lavreysen (m) / (United Kingdom) Emma Finucane (f)
  - Team sprint winners: Netherlands (m) / Germany (f)
  - Team pursuit winners: United Kingdom (m) / Italy (f)
  - Keirin winners: (Netherlands) Harrie Lavreysen (m) / (Germany) Lea Sophie Friedrich (f)
  - Omnium winners: (United Kingdom) Ethan Hayter (m) / (Norway) Anita Stenberg (f)
  - Madison winners: Germany (m) / France (f)
  - Time trial winners: (Italy) Matteo Bianchi (m) / (United Kingdom) Katy Marchant (f)
  - Individual pursuit winners: (United Kingdom) Daniel Bigham (m) / (United Kingdom) Josie Knight (f)
  - Points race winners: (Denmark) Niklas Larsen (m) / (Belgium) Lotte Kopecky (f)
  - Scratch winners: (Portugal) Iúri Leitão (m) / (France) Clara Copponi (f)
  - Elimination race winners: (Denmark) Tobias Hansen (m) / (Belgium) Lotte Kopecky (f)
- January 10–14: 2024 Track Cycling CAC African Championships in Cairo
  - Sprint winners: (South Africa) Jean Spies (m) / (Egypt) Shahd Mohamed (w) / (Mauritius) Samuel Dupuy (mj) / (Egypt) Sara Anwar (wj)
  - Team sprint winners: South Africa (m) / Egypt (w) / Egypt (mj) / Egypt (wj)
  - Team pursuit winners: Algeria (m) / Egypt (w) / South Africa (mj) / Egypt (wj)
  - Keirin winners: (South Africa) Jean Spies (m) / (South Africa) Ainslii de Beer (w) / (South Africa) Rhys Burrell (mj) / (Egypt) Sara Anwar (wj)
  - Omnium winners: (Egypt) Mahmoud Bakr (m) / (Egypt) Ebtissam Mohamed (w) / (South Africa) Gustav Roller (mj) / (Egypt) Alaliaa Darwish (wj)
  - Madison winners: Algeria (m) / South Africa (w) / South Africa (mj) / Egypt (wj)
  - Time trial winners: (South Africa) Johannes Mayburgh (m) / (Egypt) Shahd Mohamed (w) / (South Africa) Morgan Jones (mj) / (Egypt) Sara Anwar (wj)
  - Individual pursuit winners: (Egypt) Mahmoud Bakr (m) / (South Africa) S'annara Grove (m) / (South Africa) Rhys Burrell (mj) / (Egypt) Habiba Osama (wj)
  - Points race winners: (Algeria) Mohamed Nadjib Assal (m) / (Egypt) Ebtissam Mohamed (w) / (South Africa) Rhys Burrell (mj) / (Egypt) Alaliaa Darwish (wj)
  - Scratch winners: (Egypt) Mahmoud Bakr (m) / (Egypt) Ebtissam Mohamed (w) / (South Africa) Gustav Roller (mj) / (Egypt) Habiba Osama (wj)
  - Elimination race winners: (Algeria) Yacine Chalel (m) / (Egypt) Ebtissam Mohamed (w) / (Algeria) Anes Riahi (m) / (Egypt) Habiba Osama (wj)
- February 14–18: 2024 Oceania Track Championships in Cambridge
  - Sprint winners: (Australia) Matthew Richardson (m) / (Australia) Kristina Clonan (w) / (Australia) Tayte Ryan (mj) / (Australia) Liliya Tatarinoff (wj)
  - Team sprint winners: Australia (m) / Australia (w) / Australia (mj) / New Zealand (wj)
  - Team pursuit winners: New Zealand (m) / New Zealand (w) / New Zealand (mj) / New Zealand (wj)
  - Keirin winners: (Australia) Matthew Richardson (m) / (Australia) Kristina Clonan (w) / (Australia) Tayte Ryan (mj) / (New Zealand) Caitlin Kelly (wj)
  - Omnium winners: (New Zealand) Aaron Gate (m) / (New Zealand) Ally Wollaston (w) / (Australia) Matthew Davidson (mj) / (New Zealand) Elena Worrall (wj)
  - Madison winners: New Zealand (m) / New Zealand (w) / New Zealand (mj) / Australia (wj)
  - Time trial winners: (Australia) Thomas Cornish (m) / (Australia) Kristina Clonan (w) / (Australia) Tayte Ryan (mj) / (Australia) Liliya Tatarinoff (wj)
  - Individual pursuit winners: (New Zealand) Aaron Gate (m) / (New Zealand) Bryony Botha (m) / (Australia) Oscar Gallagher (mj) / (Australia) Lilyth Jones (wj)
  - Points race winners: (New Zealand) Aaron Gate (m) / (New Zealand) Ally Wollaston (w) / (New Zealand) Daniel Morton (mj)/ (New Zealand) Mya Wolfenden (wj)
  - Scratch winners: (Australia) Kelland O'Brien (m) / (New Zealand) Ally Wollaston (w) / (Australia) Oscar Gallagher (mj) / (Australia) Ella Liang (wj)
  - Elimination race winners: (New Zealand) Aaron Gate (m) / (New Zealand) Ally Wollaston (w) / (New Zealand) Magnus Jamieson (mj) / (Australia) Lilyth Jones (wj)
- February 21–26: 2024 Asian Track Cycling Championships in New Delhi
  - Sprint winners: (Japan) Yuta Obara (m) / (China) Wang Lijuan (f) / (South Korea) Park Jun-seon (mj) / (South Korea) Park Ye-been (wj)
  - Team sprint winners: Japan (m) / China (f) / South Korea (mj) / India (wj)
  - Team pursuit winners: Japan (m) / Japan (f) / Chinese Taipei (mj) / South Korea (wj)
  - Keirin winners: (Japan) Kento Yamasaki (m) / (Malaysia) Nurul Izzah Izzati Asri (f) / (Thailand) Norasetthada Bunma (mj) / (South Korea) Park Ye-been (wj)
  - Omnium winners: (Japan) Eiya Hashimoto (m) / (Japan) Yumi Kajihara (f) / (Chinese Taipei) Li Jing-feng (mj) / (South Korea) Hyeon Yu-mi (wj)
  - Madison winners: Japan (m) / Japan (f) / Japan (mj) / Kazakhstan (wj)
  - Time trial winners: (China) Li Zhiwei (m) / (Malaysia) Nurul Izzah Izzati Asri (f) / (South Korea) Park Jun-seon (mj) / (South Korea) Park Ye-been (wj)
  - Individual pursuit winners: (Japan) Shoi Matsuda (m) / (Japan) Maho Kakita (f) / (Japan) Kazuma Miura (mj) / (Kazakhstan) Mariya Yelkina (wj)
  - Points race winners: (Japan) Naoki Kojima (m) / (Japan) Tsuyaka Uchino (f) / (Indonesia) Julian Abi Manyu (mj) / (Kazakhstan) Aruzhan Rakhmzhan (wj)
  - Scratch winners: (Indonesia) Terry Yudha Kusuma (m) / (China) Liu Jiali (f) / (Kazakhstan) Yerdaulet Yegizbay (mj) / (Chinese Taipei) Huang Wen-xin (wj)
  - Elimination race winners: (Japan) Shunsuke Imamura (m) / (Japan) Yumi Kajihara (f) / (South Korea) Park Woo-jin (mj) / (Chinese Taipei) Huang Wen-xin (wj)
- April 3–7: 2024 Pan American Track Cycling Championships in Carson
  - Sprint winners: (Trinidad and Tobago) Nicholas Paul (m) / (Mexico) Daniela Gaxiola (w)
  - Team sprint winners: Colombia (m) / Mexico (w)
  - Team pursuit winners: United States (m) / United States (w)
  - Keirin winners: (Trinidad and Tobago) Nicholas Paul (m) / (Colombia) Martha Bayona (w)
  - Omnium winners: (Canada) Chris Ernst (m) / (United States) Jennifer Valente (w)
  - Madison winners: United States (m) / United States (w)
  - Time trial winners: (Colombia) Santiago Ramírez (m) / (Colombia) Martha Bayona (w)
  - Individual pursuit winners: (United States) Anders Johnson (m) / (United States) Emily Ehrlich (m)
  - Points race winners: (United States) Peter Moore (m) / (United States) Jennifer Valente (w)
  - Scratch winners: (Mexico) Fernando Nava Romo (m) / (United States) Jennifer Valente (w)
  - Elimination race winners: (United States) Grant Koontz (m) / (United States) Jennifer Valente (w)
- July 9–14: 2024 UEC European Track Championships (under-23 & junior) in (Germany) Cottbus
- October 16–20: 2024 UCI Track Cycling World Championships in (Denmark) Ballerup

=== 2024 UCI Track Cycling Nations Cup ===
- February 2–4: TNC #1 in Adelaide
  - Sprint winners: (Japan) Kaiya Ota (m) / (Germany) Emma Hinze (f)
  - Keirin winners: (Malaysia) Azizulhasni Awang (m) / (Japan) Mina Sato (f)
  - Elimination Race winners: (Canada) Dylan Bibic (m) / (New Zealand) Ally Wollaston (f)
  - Omnium winners: (Canada) Dylan Bibic (m) / (New Zealand) Ally Wollaston (f)
  - Team sprint winners: Australia (m) / United Kingdom (f)
  - Team pursuit winners: United Kingdom (m) / New Zealand (f)
  - Two team races winners: New Zealand (m) / United Kingdom (f)
- March 15–17: TNC #2 in Hong Kong
  - Sprint winners: (Japan) Kaiya Ota (m) / (United Kingdom) Emma Finucane (f)
  - Keirin winners: (Japan) Kaiya Ota (m) / (United Kingdom) Emma Finucane (f)
  - Elimination Race winners: (United Kingdom) William Perrett (m) / (Japan) Yumi Kajihara (f)
  - Madison winners: (New Zealand) Aaron Gate & Campbell Stewart (m) / (Japan) Maho Kakita & Tsuyaka Uchino (f)
  - Omnium winners: (New Zealand) Aaron Gate (m) / (Japan) Yumi Kajihara (f)
  - Team sprint winners: Australia (m) / United Kingdom (f)
  - Team pursuit winners: Denmark (m) / New Zealand (f)
- April 12–14: TNC #3 in (Canada) Milton
  - Sprint winners: (Netherlands) Harrie Lavreysen (m) / (France) Mathilde Gros (f)
  - Keirin winners: (Netherlands) Harrie Lavreysen (m) / (New Zealand) Ellesse Andrews (f)
  - Elimination Race winners: (Canada) Dylan Bibic (m) / (United States) Jennifer Valente (f)
  - Madison winners: (Belgium) Lindsay De Vylder & Robbe Ghys (m) / (United Kingdom) Katie Archibald & Neah Evans (f)
  - Omnium winners: (United Kingdom) Ethan Hayter (m) / (United Kingdom) Katie Archibald (f)
  - Team sprint winners: Netherlands (m) / Netherlands (f)
  - Team pursuit winners: United Kingdom (m) / United Kingdom (f)
- Overall winners:

== Cycling – Trials ==
=== World Championships ===
- December 17–21: 2024 UCI Urban Cycling World Championships in (United Arab Emirates) Abu Dhabi

== Cycling – Gran Fondo ==
- 2023–24 UCI Gran Fondo Calendar here.

=== World Championships ===
- August 29 – September 1: 2024 UCI Gran Fondo World Championships in (Denmark) Aalborg

== See also ==
2024 in keirin
