= 2024 Team dsm–firmenich PostNL (men's team) season =

Team dsm–firmenich PostNL
- 2024 season
- UCI code: DFP
- Status: UCI WorldTeam
- Manager: Iwan Spekenbrink (NED)
- Main sponsor(s): DSM
- Based: Netherlands
- Bicycles: Scott
- Groupset: Shimano

Season victories
- One-day races: 1
- Stage race overall: 2
- Stage race stages: 18
- Most wins: (Denmark) Tobias Lund Andresen (6)

The 2024 season for the Team dsm–firmenich PostNL is the 20th season in the team's existence and its 12th as a UCI WorldTeam.

== Team roster ==
As of 14 January 2024.

Rider	Date of birth
Tobias Lund Andresen (DEN)	20 August 2002 (aged 21)
Romain Bardet (FRA)	9 November 1990 (aged 33)
Warren Barguil (FRA)	28 October 1991 (aged 32)
Patrick Bevin (NZL)	15 February 1991 (aged 32)
Pavel Bittner (CZE)	29 October 2002 (aged 21)
Romain Combaud (FRA)	1 April 1991 (aged 32)
John Degenkolb (GER)	7 January 1989 (aged 34)
Matthew Dinham (AUS)	9 April 2000 (aged 23)
Patrick Eddy (AUS)	17 October 2002 (aged 21)
Alex Edmondson (AUS)	22 December 1993 (aged 30)
Nils Eekhoff (NED)	23 January 1998 (aged 25)
Sean Flynn (GBR)	2 March 2000 (aged 23)
Chris Hamilton (AUS)	18 May 1995 (aged 28)
Fabio Jakobsen (NED)	31 August 1996 (aged 27)

Rider	Date of birth
Gijs Leemreize (NED)	23 October 1999 (aged 24)
Enzo Leijnse (NED)	16 July 2001 (aged 22)
Emīls Liepiņš (LAT)	21 October 1992 (aged 31)
Niklas Märkl (GER)	3 March 1999 (aged 24)
Tim Naberman (NED)	11 May 1999 (aged 24)
Oscar Onley (GBR)	13 October 2002 (aged 21)
Max Poole (GBR)	1 March 2003 (aged 20)
Timo Roosen (NED)	11 January 1993 (aged 30)
Martijn Tusveld (NED)	9 September 1993 (aged 30)
Julius van den Berg (NED)	23 October 1996 (aged 27)
Frank van den Broek (NED)	28 December 2000 (aged 23)
Casper van Uden (NED)	22 July 2001 (aged 22)
Kevin Vermaerke (USA)	16 October 2000 (aged 23)
Bram Welten (NED)	29 March 1997 (aged 26)

== Season victories ==
Date	Race	Competition	Rider	Country	Location	Ref.
20 January	Tour Down Under, stage 5	UCI World Tour	Oscar Onley (GBR)	Australia	Willunga Hill	
30 January	AlUla Tour, stage 1	UCI Asia Tour	Casper van Uden (NED)	Saudi Arabia	Al Manshiyah Train Station	
21 April	Tour of Turkey, stage 1	UCI ProSeries	Fabio Jakobsen (NED)	Turkey	Antalya	
24 April	Tour of Turkey, stage 4	UCI ProSeries	Tobias Lund Andresen (DEN)	Turkey	Bodrum	
25 April	Tour of Turkey, stage 5	UCI ProSeries	Tobias Lund Andresen (DEN)	Turkey	Kuşadası	
26 April	Tour of Turkey, stage 6	UCI ProSeries	Frank van den Broek (NED)	Turkey	Manisa	
27 April	Tour of Turkey, stage 7	UCI ProSeries	Tobias Lund Andresen (DEN)	Turkey	İzmir	
28 April	Tour of Turkey, overall	UCI ProSeries	Frank van den Broek (NED)	Turkey		
26 May	Rund um Köln	UCI Europe Tour	Casper van Uden (NED)	Germany	Cologne	
6 June	ZLM Tour, stage 2	UCI Europe Tour	Casper van Uden (NED)	Netherlands	Wissenkerke	
8 June	ZLM Tour, stage 4	UCI Europe Tour	Casper van Uden (NED)	Netherlands	Roosendaal	
29 June	Tour de France, stage 1	UCI World Tour	Romain Bardet (FRA)	Italy	Rimini	
5 August	Vuelta a Burgos, stage 1	UCI ProSeries	Pavel Bittner (CZE)	Spain	Burgos	
9 August	Vuelta a Burgos, stage 5	UCI ProSeries	Pavel Bittner (CZE)	Spain	Condado de Treviño	
14 August	Tour of Denmark, stage 1 (TTT)	UCI ProSeries	(Note: The riders on the team were Tobias Lund Andresen, Frank van den Broek, Johan Dorussen, Alex Edmondson, Nils Eekhoff, Sean Flynn, and Warren Barguil)	Denmark	Holstebro	
16 August	Tour of Denmark, stage 3	UCI ProSeries	Tobias Lund Andresen (DEN)	Denmark	Haderslev	
18 August	Tour of Denmark, stage 5	UCI ProSeries	Tobias Lund Andresen (DEN)	Denmark	Gladsaxe	
21 August	Vuelta a España, stage 5	UCI World Tour	Pavel Bittner (CZE)	Spain	Sevilla	
1 October	Tour de Langkawi, stage 3	UCI ProSeries	Max Poole (UK)	Malaysia	Cameron Highlands	
4 October	CRO Race, stage 4	UCI Europe Tour	Tobias Lund Andresen (DEN)	Croatia	Labin	
6 October	Tour de Langkawi, overall	UCI ProSeries	Max Poole (UK)	Malaysia		

== National, Continental, and World Champions ==
Date	Discipline	Jersey	Rider	Country	Location	Ref.
22 June	Latvian National Road Race Championships		Emīls Liepiņš (LAT)	Latvia	Võru	
