= 2024 Bora–Hansgrohe season =

Bora–Hansgrohe
- 2024 season
- UCI code: BOH / RBH
- Status: UCI WorldTeam
- Manager: Ralph Denk (GER)
- Based: Germany
- Bicycles: Specialized
- Groupset: SRAM

Season victories
- One-day races: 1
- Stage race overall: 4
- Stage race stages: 16
- Grand Tours: 1
- National Championships: 3
- Most wins: (Slovenia) Primož Roglič (8)

The 2024 season for the Bora–Hansgrohe team is the team's 15th season in existence, and its 8th season as a UCI WorldTeam.

The team was officially renamed Red Bull–Bora–Hansgrohe ahead of the 2024 Tour de France.

== Team roster ==
As of 6 January 2024.

Rider	Date of birth
Roger Adrià (ESP)	18 May 1998 (aged 25)
Giovanni Aleotti (ITA)	25 May 1999 (aged 24)
Cesare Benedetti (POL)	3 August 1987 (aged 36)
Emanuel Buchmann (GER)	18 November 1992 (aged 31)
Nico Denz (GER)	15 February 1994 (aged 29)
Patrick Gamper (AUT)	18 February 1997 (aged 26)
Alexander Hajek (AUT)	19 July 2003 (aged 20)
Marco Haller (AUT)	1 April 1991 (aged 32)
Emil Herzog (GER)	6 October 2004 (aged 19)
Sergio Higuita (COL)	1 August 1997 (aged 26)
Jai Hindley (AUS)	5 May 1996 (aged 27)
Bob Jungels (LUX)	22 September 1992 (aged 31)
Jonas Koch (GER)	25 June 1993 (aged 30)
Lennard Kämna (GER)	9 September 1996 (aged 27)
Florian Lipowitz (GER)	21 September 2000 (aged 23)

Rider	Date of birth
Luis-Joe Lührs (GER)	20 January 2003 (aged 20)
Filip Maciejuk (POL)	3 September 1999 (aged 24)
Daniel Martínez (COL)	25 April 1996 (aged 27)
Jordi Meeus (BEL)	1 July 1998 (aged 25)
Ryan Mullen (IRL)	7 August 1994 (aged 29)
Anton Palzer (GER)	11 March 1993 (aged 30)
Primož Roglič (SLO)	29 October 1989 (aged 34)
Max Schachmann (GER)	9 January 1994 (aged 29)
Matteo Sobrero (ITA)	14 June 1997 (aged 26)
Danny van Poppel (NED)	26 July 1993 (aged 30)
Aleksandr Vlasov (RUS)	23 April 1996 (aged 27)
Frederik Wandahl (DEN)	9 May 2001 (aged 22)
Sam Welsford (AUS)	19 January 1996 (aged 27)
Ben Zwiehoff (GER)	22 February 1994 (aged 29)

== Season victories ==
Date	Race	Competition	Rider	Country	Location	Ref.
16 January	Tour Down Under, stage 1	UCI World Tour	Sam Welsford (AUS)	Australia	Tanunda	
18 January	Tour Down Under, stage 3	UCI World Tour	Sam Welsford (AUS)	Australia	Campbelltown	
19 January	Tour Down Under, stage 4	UCI World Tour	Sam Welsford (AUS)	Australia	Port Elliot	
15 February	Volta ao Algarve, stage 2	UCI ProSeries	Daniel Martínez (COL)	Portugal	Alto da Fóia	
18 February	Volta ao Algarve, stage 5	UCI ProSeries	Daniel Martínez (COL)	Portugal	Alto do Malhão	
9 March	Paris–Nice, stage 7	UCI World Tour	Aleksandr Vlasov (RUS)	France	Madone d'Utelle	
1 April	Tour of the Basque Country, stage 1 (ITT)	UCI World Tour	Primož Roglič (SLO)	Spain	Irun	
8 May	Tour de Hongrie, stage 1	UCI ProSeries	Sam Welsford (AUS)	Hungary	Hajdúszoboszló	
25 May	Tour of Norway, stage 3	UCI ProSeries	Jordi Meeus (BEL)	Norway	Egersund	
7 June	Critérium du Dauphiné, stage 6	UCI World Tour	Primož Roglič (SLO)	France	Le Collet d'Allevard	
8 June	Critérium du Dauphiné, stage 7	UCI World Tour	Primož Roglič (SLO)	France	Samoëns 1600	
9 June	Critérium du Dauphiné, overall	UCI World Tour	Primož Roglič (SLO)	France		
14 June	Tour of Slovenia, stage 3	UCI ProSeries	Giovanni Aleotti (ITA)	Slovenia	Nova Gorica	
16 June	Tour of Slovenia, overall	UCI ProSeries	Giovanni Aleotti (ITA)	Slovenia		
9 July	Sibiu Cycling Tour, overall	UCI Europe Tour	Florian Lipowitz (GER)	Romania		
22 July	Tour de Wallonie, stage 1	UCI ProSeries	Jordi Meeus (BEL)	Belgium	Fleurus	
20 August	Vuelta a España, stage 4	UCI World Tour	Primož Roglič (SLO)	Spain	Pico Villuercas	
24 August	Vuelta a España, stage 8	UCI World Tour	Primož Roglič (SLO)	Spain	Cazorla	
6 September	Vuelta a España, stage 19	UCI World Tour	Primož Roglič (SLO)	Spain	Alto de Moncalvillo	
8 September	Vuelta a España, overall	UCI World Tour	Primož Roglič (SLO)	Spain		
18 September	Grand Prix de Wallonie	UCI ProSeries	Roger Adrià (ESP)	Belgium	Namur	

== National, Continental, and World Champions ==
Date	Discipline	Jersey	Rider	Country	Location	Ref.
25 January	Colombian National Time Trial Championships		Daniel Martínez (COL)	Colombia	Tunja	
20 June	Polish National Time Trial Championships		Filip Maciejuk (POL)	Poland	Radzanowo	
23 June	Austrian National Road Race Championships		Alexander Hajek (AUT)	Austria	Königswiesen	
