= Kristian Egholm =

Danish cyclist

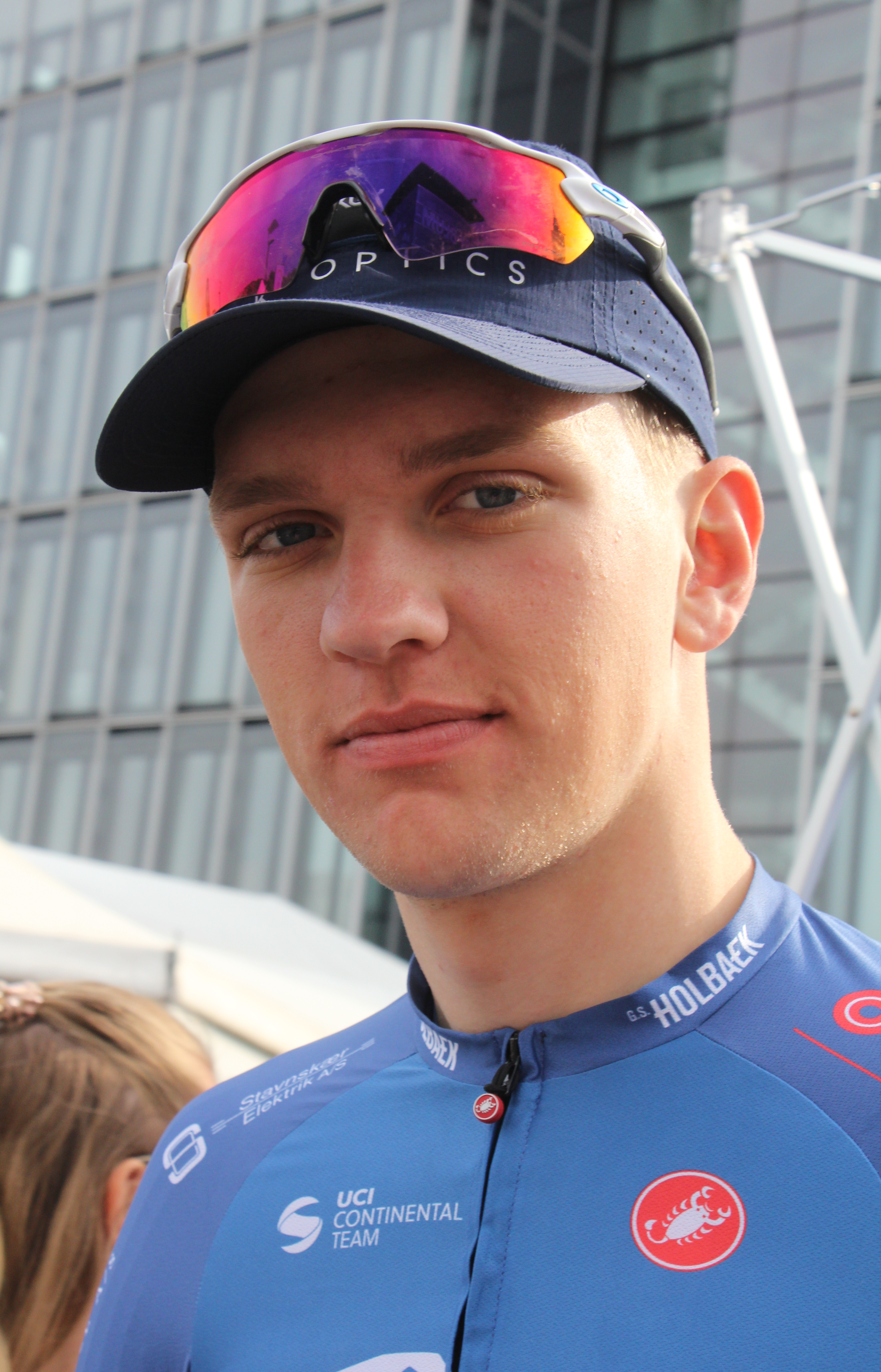
- Egholm in 2023

Personal information
- Born: 16 March 2004 (age 22) Holbæk, Denmark

Cycling career
- Sport: Cycling
- Current team: Lidl–Trek Future Racing
- Discipline: Road
- Role: Rider

Amateur team
- 2021–2022: NPV–Carl Ras Roskilde Junior

Professional teams
- 2023: Restaurant Suri–Carl Ras
- 2024–: Lidl–Trek Future Racing

Major wins
- One-day races and Classics National Time Trial Championships (2026)

Kristian Egholm (born 16 March 2004) is a Danish racing cyclist, who currently rides for UCI Continental team Lidl–Trek Future Racing. He won the Danish National Time Trial Championships in 2026.

== Major results ==
2021
3rd Time trial, National Junior Road Championships
2022
4th Paris–Roubaix Juniors
5th Overall Course de la Paix Juniors
2024
1st Mountains classification, Danmark Rundt
1st Stage 1 Orlen Nations Grand Prix
2026 (1 pro win)
1st Time trial, National Road Championships
2nd Time trial, National Under-23 Road Championships
6th Time trial, UCI Road World Under-23 Championships
8th Fyen Rundt
9th Grand Prix Herning
