= 2026 Gent–Wevelgem =

Belgian one-day cycling race

2026 UCI World Tour, race 12 of 36
- Event poster with previous winners Lorena Wiebes and Mads Pedersen

Race details
- Dates: 29 March 2026
- Stages: 1
- Distance: 240.8 km (149.6 mi)
- Winning time: 5h 08' 03"

Results
	Winner	Jasper Philipsen (BEL)	(Alpecin–Premier Tech)
	Second	Tobias Lund Andresen (DEN)	(Decathlon CMA CGM)
	Third	Christophe Laporte (FRA)	(Visma–Lease a Bike)

The 2026 In Flanders Fields - From Middelkerke to Wevelgem was a road cycling one-day race that took place on 29 March in the provinces of West Flanders and Hainaut in west Belgium. It was the 88th edition of the race previously known as Gent–Wevelgem and the 12th event of the 2026 UCI World Tour. Jasper Philipsen of the Alpecin–Premier Tech team won the race.

== Teams ==
Twenty-five teams participated in the race, including all eighteen UCI WorldTeams and seven UCI ProTeams.

UCI WorldTeams

- Alpecin–Premier Tech
- Decathlon CMA CGM
- EF Education–EasyPost
- Groupama–FDJ United
- INEOS Grenadiers
- Lotto–Intermarché
- Lidl–Trek
- Movistar Team
- NSN Cycling Team
- Red Bull–Bora–Hansgrohe
- Soudal–Quick-Step
- Team Bahrain Victorious
- Team Jayco–AlUla
- Team Picnic–PostNL
- UAE Team Emirates XRG
- Uno-X Mobility
- Visma–Lease a Bike
- XDS Astana Team

UCI ProTeams

- Burgos Burpellet BH
- Cofidis
- Pinarello–Q36.5 Pro Cycling Team
- Team Flanders–Baloise
- Team TotalEnergies
- Tudor Pro Cycling Team
- Unibet Rose Rockets

== Result ==
Result (1–10)
Rank	Rider	Team	Time
1	Jasper Philipsen (BEL)	Alpecin–Premier Tech	5h 08' 03"
2	Tobias Lund Andresen (DEN)	Decathlon CMA CGM	+ 0"
3	Christophe Laporte (FRA)	Visma–Lease a Bike	+ 0"
4	Arnaud De Lie (BEL)	Lotto–Intermarché	+ 0"
5	Robert Donaldson (GBR)	Team Jayco–AlUla	+ 0"
6	Matteo Trentin (ITA)	Tudor Pro Cycling Team	+ 0"
7	Luca Mozzato (ITA)	Tudor Pro Cycling Team	+ 0"
8	Aimé De Gendt (BEL)	Pinarello–Q36.5 Pro Cycling Team	+ 0"
9	Jonas Abrahamsen (NOR)	Uno-X Mobility	+ 0"
10	Jasper Stuyven (BEL)	Soudal–Quick-Step	+ 0"
