= 2026 Cadel Evans Great Ocean Road Race =

Cycling race

2026 UCI World Tour, race 2 of 36

Race details
- Dates: 1 February 2026
- Stages: 1
- Distance: 182.3 km (113.3 mi)
- Winning time: 4h 15' 25"

Results
	Winner	Tobias Lund Andresen (DEN)	(Decathlon CMA CGM)
	Second	Matthew Brennan (GBR)	(Visma–Lease a Bike)
	Third	Brady Gilmore (AUS)	(NSN Cycling Team)

The 2026 Cadel Evans Great Ocean Road Race was a road cycling race that was held on 1 February in Geelong, Australia. It was the tenth edition of the Cadel Evans Great Ocean Road Race and the second event of the 2026 UCI World Tour.

== Teams ==
All eighteen UCI WorldTeams, one UCI ProTeam, and the Australian national team participated in the race.

UCI WorldTeams

- Alpecin–Premier Tech
- Decathlon CMA CGM
- EF Education–EasyPost
- Groupama–FDJ United
- INEOS Grenadiers
- Lidl–Trek
- Lotto–Intermarché
- Movistar Team
- NSN Cycling Team
- Red Bull–Bora–Hansgrohe
- Soudal–Quick-Step
- Team Bahrain Victorious
- Team Jayco–AlUla
- Team Picnic–PostNL
- Visma–Lease a Bike
- UAE Team Emirates XRG
- Uno-X Mobility
- XDS Astana Team

UCI ProTeams

- Tudor Pro Cycling Team

National Teams

- Australia

== Result ==
Result
Rank	Rider	Team	Time
1	Tobias Lund Andresen (DEN)	Decathlon CMA CGM	4h 15' 25"
2	Matthew Brennan (GBR)	Visma–Lease a Bike	+ 0"
3	Brady Gilmore (AUS)	NSN Cycling Team	+ 0"
4	Mauro Schmid (SUI)	Team Jayco–AlUla	+ 0"
5	Natnael Tesfatsion (ERI)	Movistar Team	+ 0"
6	Laurence Pithie (NZL)	Red Bull–Bora–Hansgrohe	+ 0"
7	Filippo Zana (ITA)	Soudal–Quick-Step	+ 0"
8	Gal Glivar (SLO)	Alpecin–Premier Tech	+ 0"
9	Francesco Busatto (ITA)	Alpecin–Premier Tech	+ 0"
10	Aaron Gate (NZL)	XDS Astana Team	+ 0"
