= 2024 Tre Valli Varesine =

2024 UCI ProSeries

Race details
- Dates: 8 October 2024
- Stages: 1
- Distance: 200.33 km (124.5 mi)

The 2024 Tre Valli Varesine was supposed to be the 103rd edition of the Tre Valli Varesine road cycling one day race, which was to be held on 8 October 2024 as part of the 2024 UCI ProSeries calendar.

The race was stopped and cancelled with 110 km (68 mi) to go because of heavy rainstorms and flooding.

== Teams ==
Seventeen UCI WorldTeams and seven UCI ProTeams made up the twenty-four teams that participated in the cancelled race.

UCI WorldTeams

- Alpecin–Deceuninck
- Astana Qazaqstan Team
- Cofidis
- Decathlon–AG2R La Mondiale
- EF Education–EasyPost
- Groupama–FDJ
- Ineos Grenadiers
- Intermarché–Wanty
- Lidl–Trek
- Movistar Team
- Red Bull–Bora–Hansgrohe
- Soudal–Quick-Step
- Team Bahrain Victorious
- Team dsm–firmenich PostNL
- Team Jayco–AlUla
- UAE Team Emirates
- Visma–Lease a Bike

UCI ProTeams

- Euskaltel–Euskadi
- Israel–Premier Tech
- Lotto–Dstny
- Polti–Kometa
- Team Corratec–Vini Fantini
- Team TotalEnergies
- VF Group–Bardiani–CSF–Faizanè
