= 2024 Danmark Rundt =

2024 UCI ProSeries
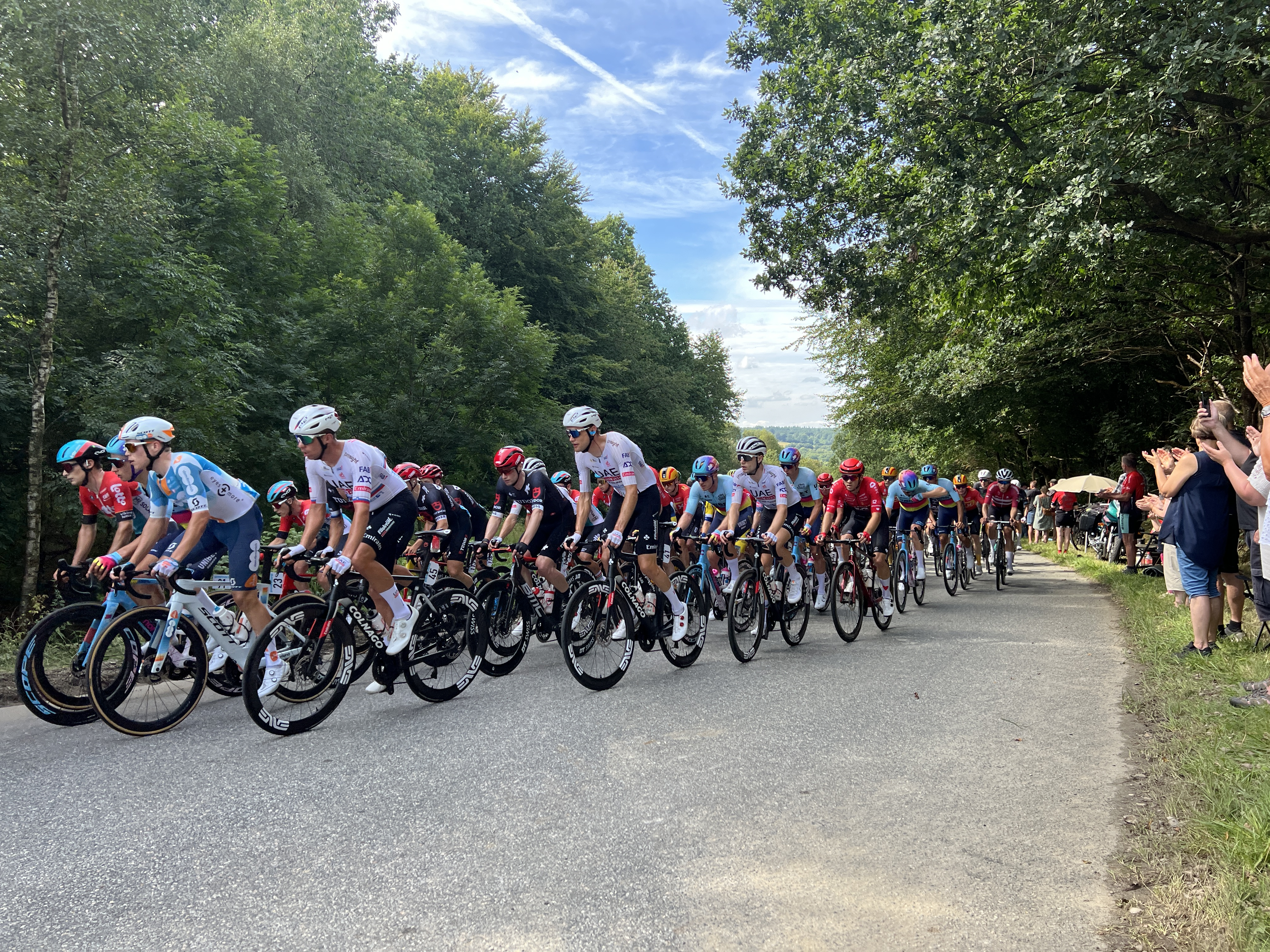

Race details
- Dates: 14–18 August 2024
- Stages: 5
- Distance: 742.8 km (461.6 mi)
- Winning time: 15h 56' 14"

Results
Jersey awarded to the overall winner	Winner	Arnaud De Lie (BEL)	(Lotto–Dstny)
	Second	Magnus Cort (DEN)	(Uno-X Mobility)
	Third	Anders Foldager (DEN)	(Team PostNord Landsholdet)
Jersey awarded to the points classification winner	Points	Tobias Lund Andresen (DEN)	(Team dsm–firmenich PostNL)
Jersey awarded to the mountains classification winner	Mountains	Kristian Egholm (DEN)	(Lidl–Trek Future Racing)
Jersey awarded to the youth classification winner	Youth	Arnaud De Lie (BEL)	(Lotto–Dstny)
Jersey awarded to the combativity classification winner	Combativity	Victor Grue Enggaard (DEN)	(BHS–PL Beton Bornholm)
	Team	(Netherlands) Team dsm–firmenich PostNL	

The 2024 Danmark Rundt (officially PostNord Danmark Rundt 2024 for sponsorship reasons) was the 33rd edition of the Danmark Rundt road cycling stage race, which is the part of the 2024 UCI ProSeries. It began on the 14th of August in Holstebro and finished on the 18th of August in Gladsaxe.

== Teams ==
Three UCI WorldTeams, eight UCI ProTeams, seven UCI Continental teams and the Danish national team made up the eighteen teams that will participate in the race.

UCI WorldTeams

- Alpecin–Deceuninck
- Team dsm–firmenich PostNL
- UAE Team Emirates

UCI ProTeams

- Lotto–Dstny
- Q36.5 Pro Cycling Team
- TDT–Unibet Cycling Team
- Team Flanders–Baloise
- Team Novo Nordisk
- Tudor Pro Cycling Team
- Uno-X Mobility
- VF Group–Bardiani–CSF–Faizanè

UCI Continental Teams

- Airtox–Carl Ras
- BHS–PL Beton Bornholm
- Lidl–Trek Future Racing
- Mazowsze Serce Polski
- Parkhotel Valkenburg
- Team ColoQuick
- Team Coop–Repsol

National Teams

- Team PostNord Landsholdet

== Route ==
Stage characteristics and winners
Stage	Date	Course	Distance	Type	Stage winner
1	14 August	Holstebro to Holstebro	13.7 km (8.5 mi)	Team time trial	(Netherlands) Team dsm–firmenich PostNL
2	15 August	Ringkøbing to Vejle	231 km (144 mi)	Hilly stage	Magnus Cort (DEN)
3	16 August	Kolding to Haderslev	156 km (97 mi)	Flat stage	Tobias Lund Andresen (DEN)
4	17 August	Stevns to Holbæk	177.5 km (110.3 mi)	Flat stage	Jelte Krijnsen (NED)
5	18 August	Roskilde to Gladsaxe	164.6 km (102.3 mi)	Flat stage	Tobias Lund Andresen (DEN)
Total			742.8 km (461.6 mi)		

== Stages ==
=== Stage 1 ===
14 August — Holstebro to Holstebro, 13.7 km (8.5 mi) (TTT)

Stage 1 Result
Rank	Team	Time
1	(Netherlands) Team dsm–firmenich PostNL	14' 31"
2	(United Arab Emirates) UAE Team Emirates	+ 0"
3	(Belgium) Lotto–Dstny	+ 1"
4	(Denmark) Team PostNord Landsholdet	+ 5"
5	(Denmark) Team ColoQuick	+ 6"
6	(Norway) Uno-X Mobility	+ 7"
7	(Switzerland) Q36.5 Pro Cycling Team	+ 14"
8	(Denmark) Airtox–Carl Ras	+ 16"
9	(Netherlands) TDT–Unibet Cycling Team	+ 17"
10	(Belgium) Team Flanders–Baloise	+ 18"

General classification after Stage 1
Rank	Rider	Team	Time
1	Tobias Lund Andresen (DEN)	Team dsm–firmenich PostNL	14' 31"
2	Johan Dorussen (NED)	Team dsm–firmenich PostNL	+ 0"
3	Ivo Oliveira (POR)	UAE Team Emirates	+ 0"
4	Frank van den Broek (NED)	Team dsm–firmenich PostNL	+ 0"
5	Finn Fisher-Black (NZL)	UAE Team Emirates	+ 1"
6	Mikkel Bjerg (DEN)	UAE Team Emirates	+ 1"
7	Sjoerd Bax (NED)	UAE Team Emirates	+ 1"
8	Jenno Berckmoes (BEL)	Lotto–Dstny	+ 3"
9	Jasper De Buyst (BEL)	Lotto–Dstny	+ 3"
10	Arnaud De Lie (BEL)	Lotto–Dstny	+ 3"

=== Stage 2 ===
15 August — Ringkøbing to Vejle, 231 km (144 mi)

Stage 2 Result
Rank	Rider	Team	Time
1	Magnus Cort (DEN)	Uno-X Mobility	5h 17' 10"
2	Arnaud De Lie (BEL)	Lotto–Dstny	+ 0"
3	Søren Kragh Andersen (DEN)	Alpecin–Deceuninck	+ 4"
4	Anders Foldager (DEN)	Team PostNord Landsholdet	+ 10"
5	Michael Gogl (AUT)	Alpecin–Deceuninck	+ 18"
6	Sean Flynn (GBR)	Team dsm–firmenich PostNL	+ 18"
7	Jenno Berckmoes (BEL)	Lotto–Dstny	+ 27"
8	Matteo Trentin (ITA)	Tudor Pro Cycling Team	+ 31"
9	Frank van den Broek (NED)	Team dsm–firmenich PostNL	+ 31"
10	Jelle Johannink (NED)	TDT–Unibet Cycling Team	+ 57"

General classification after Stage 2
Rank	Rider	Team	Time
1	Arnaud De Lie (BEL)	Lotto–Dstny	5h 31' 38"
2	Magnus Cort (DEN)	Uno-X Mobility	+ 0"
3	Anders Foldager (DEN)	Team PostNord Landsholdet	+ 18"
4	Søren Kragh Andersen (DEN)	Alpecin–Deceuninck	+ 24"
5	Jenno Berckmoes (BEL)	Lotto–Dstny	+ 33"
6	Frank van den Broek (NED)	Team dsm–firmenich PostNL	+ 34"
7	Michael Gogl (AUT)	Alpecin–Deceuninck	+ 42"
8	Matteo Trentin (ITA)	Tudor Pro Cycling Team	+ 54"
9	Sean Flynn (GBR)	Team dsm–firmenich PostNL	+ 57"
10	Mikkel Bjerg (DEN)	UAE Team Emirates	+ 1' 05"

=== Stage 3 ===
16 August — Kolding to Haderslev, 156 km (97 mi)

Stage 3 Result
Rank	Rider	Team	Time
1	Tobias Lund Andresen (DEN)	Team dsm–firmenich PostNL	3h 16' 59"
2	Arnaud De Lie (BEL)	Lotto–Dstny	+ 0"
3	Magnus Cort (DEN)	Uno-X Mobility	+ 0"
4	Matteo Trentin (ITA)	Tudor Pro Cycling Team	+ 0"
5	Jelte Krijnsen (NED)	Parkhotel Valkenburg	+ 0"
6	Nicolò Parisini (ITA)	Q36.5 Pro Cycling Team	+ 0"
7	Søren Kragh Andersen (DEN)	Alpecin–Deceuninck	+ 0"
8	Rui Oliveira (POR)	UAE Team Emirates	+ 0"
9	Aaron Van Poucke (BEL)	Team Flanders–Baloise	+ 0"
10	Sean Flynn (GBR)	Team dsm–firmenich PostNL	+ 0"

General classification after Stage 3
Rank	Rider	Team	Time
1	Arnaud De Lie (BEL)	Lotto–Dstny	8h 48' 28"
2	Magnus Cort (DEN)	Uno-X Mobility	+ 5"
3	Anders Foldager (DEN)	Team PostNord Landsholdet	+ 27"
4	Søren Kragh Andersen (DEN)	Alpecin–Deceuninck	+ 33"
5	Jenno Berckmoes (BEL)	Lotto–Dstny	+ 41"
6	Frank van den Broek (NED)	Team dsm–firmenich PostNL	+ 43"
7	Michael Gogl (AUT)	Alpecin–Deceuninck	+ 51"
8	Matteo Trentin (ITA)	Tudor Pro Cycling Team	+ 1' 03"
9	Sean Flynn (GBR)	Team dsm–firmenich PostNL	+ 1' 06"
10	Andreas Leknessund (NOR)	Uno-X Mobility	+ 1' 20"

=== Stage 4 ===
17 August — Stevns to Holbæk, 177.5 km (110.3 mi)

Stage 4 Result
Rank	Rider	Team	Time
1	Jelte Krijnsen (NED)	Parkhotel Valkenburg	3h 49' 05"
2	Anton Stensby (NOR)	Team Coop–Repsol	+ 17"
3	Tobias Lund Andresen (DEN)	Team dsm–firmenich PostNL	+ 23"
4	Arvid de Kleijn (NED)	Tudor Pro Cycling Team	+ 23"
5	Arnaud De Lie (BEL)	Lotto–Dstny	+ 23"
6	Nils Eekhoff (NED)	Team dsm–firmenich PostNL	+ 23"
7	Giacomo Nizzolo (ITA)	Q36.5 Pro Cycling Team	+ 23"
8	Luca Colnaghi (ITA)	VF Group–Bardiani–CSF–Faizanè	+ 23"
9	Rui Oliveira (POR)	UAE Team Emirates	+ 23"
10	Tim Torn Teutenberg (GER)	Lidl–Trek Future Racing	+ 23"

General classification after Stage 4
Rank	Rider	Team	Time
1	Arnaud De Lie (BEL)	Lotto–Dstny	12h 37' 56"
2	Magnus Cort (DEN)	Uno-X Mobility	+ 5"
3	Anders Foldager (DEN)	Team PostNord Landsholdet	+ 27"
4	Søren Kragh Andersen (DEN)	Alpecin–Deceuninck	+ 33"
5	Jenno Berckmoes (BEL)	Lotto–Dstny	+ 41"
6	Michael Gogl (AUT)	Alpecin–Deceuninck	+ 51"
7	Frank van den Broek (NED)	Team dsm–firmenich PostNL	+ 52"
8	Matteo Trentin (ITA)	Tudor Pro Cycling Team	+ 1' 03"
9	Sean Flynn (GBR)	Team dsm–firmenich PostNL	+ 1' 06"
10	Andreas Leknessund (NOR)	Uno-X Mobility	+ 1' 29"

=== Stage 5 ===
18 August — Roskilde to Gladsaxe, 164.6 km (102.3 mi)

Stage 5 Result
Rank	Rider	Team	Time
1	Tobias Lund Andresen (DEN)	Team dsm–firmenich PostNL	3h 18' 18"
2	Enrico Zanoncello (ITA)	VF Group–Bardiani–CSF–Faizanè	+ 0"
3	Magnus Cort (DEN)	Uno-X Mobility	+ 0"
4	Daniel Stampe (DEN)	Airtox–Carl Ras	+ 0"
5	Giacomo Nizzolo (ITA)	Q36.5 Pro Cycling Team	+ 0"
6	Rui Oliveira (POR)	UAE Team Emirates	+ 0"
7	Arvid de Kleijn (NED)	Tudor Pro Cycling Team	+ 0"
8	Jenno Berckmoes (BEL)	Lotto–Dstny	+ 0"
9	Tim Torn Teutenberg (GER)	Lidl–Trek Future Racing	+ 0"
10	Nils Eekhoff (NED)	Team dsm–firmenich PostNL	+ 0"

General classification after Stage 5
Rank	Rider	Team	Time
1	Arnaud De Lie (BEL)	Lotto–Dstny	15h 56' 14"
2	Magnus Cort (DEN)	Uno-X Mobility	+ 1"
3	Anders Foldager (DEN)	Team PostNord Landsholdet	+ 27"
4	Søren Kragh Andersen (DEN)	Alpecin–Deceuninck	+ 33"
5	Jenno Berckmoes (BEL)	Lotto–Dstny	+ 41"
6	Michael Gogl (AUT)	Alpecin–Deceuninck	+ 51"
7	Frank van den Broek (NED)	Team dsm–firmenich PostNL	+ 52"
8	Matteo Trentin (ITA)	Tudor Pro Cycling Team	+ 1' 03"
9	Sean Flynn (GBR)	Team dsm–firmenich PostNL	+ 1' 06"
10	Andreas Leknessund (NOR)	Uno-X Mobility	+ 1' 29"

== Classification leadership table ==
Stage	Winner	General classification	Points classification	Mountains classification	Young rider classification	Active rider classification	Team classification
1	Team dsm–firmenich PostNL	Tobias Lund Andresen	Tobias Lund Andresen	Jesper Rasch	Tobias Lund Andresen	not awarded	Team dsm–firmenich PostNL
2	Magnus Cort	Arnaud De Lie	Magnus Cort	Daniel Stampe	Arnaud De Lie	Jasper Dejaegher	Team dsm–firmenich PostNL
3	Tobias Lund Andresen	Arnaud De Lie	Arnaud De Lie	Daniel Stampe	Arnaud De Lie	Jasper Dejaegher	Team dsm–firmenich PostNL
4	Jelte Krijnsen	Arnaud De Lie	Tobias Lund Andresen	Kristian Egholm	Arnaud De Lie	Pelle Køster Mikkelsen	Team dsm–firmenich PostNL
5	Tobias Lund Andresen	Arnaud De Lie	Tobias Lund Andresen	Kristian Egholm	Arnaud De Lie	Victor Grue Enggaard	Team dsm–firmenich PostNL
Final		Arnaud De Lie	Tobias Lund Andresen	Kristian Egholm	Arnaud De Lie	Victor Grue Enggaard	Team dsm–firmenich PostNL

== Classification standings ==
Legend
Denotes the winner of the general classification	Denotes the winner of the young rider classification
Denotes the winner of the points classification	Denotes the winner of the active rider classification
Denotes the winner of the mountains classification	

=== General classification ===
Final general classification (1–10)
Rank	Rider	Team	Time
1	Arnaud De Lie (BEL)	Lotto–Dstny	15h 56' 14"
2	Magnus Cort (DEN)	Uno-X Mobility	+ 1"
3	Anders Foldager (DEN)	Team PostNord Landsholdet	+ 27"
4	Søren Kragh Andersen (DEN)	Alpecin–Deceuninck	+ 33"
5	Jenno Berckmoes (BEL)	Lotto–Dstny	+ 41"
6	Michael Gogl (AUT)	Alpecin–Deceuninck	+ 51"
7	Frank van den Broek (NED)	Team dsm–firmenich PostNL	+ 52"
8	Matteo Trentin (ITA)	Tudor Pro Cycling Team	+ 1' 03"
9	Sean Flynn (GBR)	Team dsm–firmenich PostNL	+ 1' 06"
10	Andreas Leknessund (NOR)	Uno-X Mobility	+ 1' 29"

=== Points classification ===
Final points classification (1–10)
Rank	Rider	Team	Points
1	Tobias Lund Andresen (DEN)	Team dsm–firmenich PostNL	55
2	Arnaud De Lie (BEL)	Lotto–Dstny	40
3	Magnus Cort (DEN)	Uno-X Mobility	35
4	Jelte Krijnsen (NED)	Parkhotel Valkenburg	23
5	Jenno Berckmoes (BEL)	Lotto–Dstny	17
6	Søren Kragh Andersen (DEN)	Alpecin–Deceuninck	16
7	Rui Oliveira (POR)	UAE Team Emirates	16
8	Matteo Trentin (ITA)	Tudor Pro Cycling Team	15
9	Arvid de Kleijn (NED)	Tudor Pro Cycling Team	15
10	Giacomo Nizzolo (ITA)	Q36.5 Pro Cycling Team	14

=== Mountains classification ===
Final mountains classification (1–10)
Rank	Rider	Team	Points
1	Kristian Egholm (DEN)	Lidl–Trek Future Racing	46
2	Alexander Arnt Hansen (DEN)	Airtox–Carl Ras	34
3	Emil Toudal (DEN)	Team ColoQuick	24
4	Daniel Stampe (DEN)	Airtox–Carl Ras	20
5	Sébastien Grignard (BEL)	Lotto–Dstny	12
6	Pelle Køster Mikkelsen (DEN)	Team ColoQuick	12
7	Konrad Czabok (POL)	Mazowsze Serce Polski	12
8	Jakub Kaczmarek (POL)	Mazowsze Serce Polski	10
9	Martin Szokody (DEN)	BHS–PL Beton Bornholm	10
10	Arnaud De Lie (BEL)	Lotto–Dstny	8

=== Young rider classification ===
Final young rider classification (1–10)
Rank	Rider	Team	Time
1	Arnaud De Lie (BEL)	Lotto–Dstny	15h 56' 14"
2	Matyáš Kopecký (CZE)	Team Novo Nordisk	+ 1' 59"
3	Tim Torn Teutenberg (GER)	Lidl–Trek Future Racing	+ 5' 24"
4	Tore Troelsen (DEN)	Team ColoQuick	+ 9' 13"
5	Dylan Vandenstorme (BEL)	Team Flanders–Baloise	+ 10' 20"
6	Adam Holm Jørgensen (DEN)	Team PostNord Landsholdet	+ 10' 46"
7	Alessandro Perracchione (ITA)	Team Novo Nordisk	+ 13' 19"
8	Tobias Lund Andresen (DEN)	Team dsm–firmenich PostNL	+ 15' 12"
9	Victor Vercouillie (BEL)	Team Flanders–Baloise	+ 17' 54"
10	Malte Hellerup (DEN)	Team PostNord Landsholdet	+ 19' 13"

=== Active rider classification ===
Final active rider classification (1–10)
Rank	Rider	Team	Points
1	Victor Grue Enggaard (DEN)	BHS–PL Beton Bornholm	16
2	Pelle Køster Mikkelsen (DEN)	Team ColoQuick	12
3	Martin Szokody (DEN)	BHS–PL Beton Bornholm	12
4	Konrad Czabok (POL)	Mazowsze Serce Polski	8
5	Jakub Kaczmarek (POL)	Mazowsze Serce Polski	8
6	Alexander Arnt Hansen (DEN)	Airtox–Carl Ras	8
7	Daniel Stampe (DEN)	Airtox–Carl Ras	8
8	Manuele Tarozzi (ITA)	VF Group–Bardiani–CSF–Faizanè	4
9	Kristian Egholm (DEN)	Lidl–Trek Future Racing	4
10	Cole Kessler (USA)	Lidl–Trek Future Racing	4

=== Team classification ===
Final team classification (1–10)
Rank	Team	Time
1	(Netherlands) Team dsm–firmenich PostNL	47h 50' 44"
2	(Belgium) Alpecin–Deceuninck	+ 1' 13"
3	(Norway) Uno-X Mobility	+ 1' 44"
4	(Belgium) Lotto–Dstny	+ 3' 50"
5	(Switzerland) Q36.5 Pro Cycling Team	+ 5' 48"
6	(Netherlands) TDT–Unibet Cycling Team	+ 6' 18"
7	(Belgium) Team Flanders–Baloise	+ 7' 59"
8	(Switzerland) Tudor Pro Cycling Team	+ 8' 05"
9	(United Arab Emirates) UAE Team Emirates	+ 8' 37"
10	(Denmark) Team ColoQuick	+ 12' 31"
