= 2024 Dwars door het Hageland =

Cycling race

2024 UCI ProSeries
- Event poster with previous winners Lotte Kopecky and Rasmus Tiller

Race details
- Dates: 8 June 2024
- Stages: 1
- Distance: 178.4 km (110.9 mi)
- Winning time: 4h 04' 18"

Results
	Winner	Gianni Vermeersch (BEL)	(Alpecin–Deceuninck)
	Second	Jonas Abrahamsen (NOR)	(Uno-X Mobility)
	Third	Hartthijs de Vries (NED)	(TDT–Unibet Cycling Team)

The 2024 Dwars door het Hageland was the 19th edition of the Dwars door het Hageland road cycling one-day race, which was held on 8 June 2024 in the Belgian province of Flemish Brabant. It was a 1.Pro event on the 2024 UCI ProSeries calendar.

== Teams ==
Five of the eighteen UCI WorldTeams, seven UCI ProTeams, three UCI Continental and three UCI Cylo-cross teams made up the eighteen teams that participated in the race.

UCI WorldTeams

- Alpecin–Deceuninck
- Arkéa–B&B Hotels
- Cofidis
- Intermarché–Wanty
- Soudal–Quick-Step

UCI ProTeams

- Israel–Premier Tech
- Lotto–Dstny
- TDT–Unibet Cycling Team
- Team Flanders–Baloise
- Team Novo Nordisk
- Uno-X Mobility

UCI Continental Teams

- Philippe Wagner–Bazin
- Tarteletto–Isorex
- VolkerWessels Women's Pro Cycling Team

UCI Cyclo-cross Teams

- Pauwels Sauzen–Bingoal
- Baloise–Trek Lions
- Team Deschacht–Group Hens–Containers Maes

== Result ==
Result
Rank	Rider	Team	Time
1	Gianni Vermeersch (BEL)	Alpecin–Deceuninck	4h 04' 18"
2	Jonas Abrahamsen (NOR)	Uno-X Mobility	+ 1"
3	Hartthijs de Vries (NED)	TDT–Unibet Cycling Team	+ 11"
4	Rasmus Tiller (NOR)	Uno-X Mobility	+ 21"
5	Søren Wærenskjold (NOR)	Uno-X Mobility	+ 21"
6	Quinten Hermans (BEL)	Alpecin–Deceuninck	+ 21"
7	Pim Ronhaar (NED)	Baloise–Trek Lions	+ 21"
8	Stanisław Aniołkowski (POL)	Cofidis	+ 28"
9	Lionel Taminiaux (BEL)	Lotto–Dstny	+ 30"
10	Lander Loockx (BEL)	TDT–Unibet Cycling Team	+ 31"
