= 2024 Circuit Franco-Belge =

2024 Circuit Franco–Belge
2024 UCI ProSeries
- Event poster with previous winner Arnaud De Lie

Race details
- Dates: 29 May 2024
- Stages: 1
- Distance: 190.6 km (118.4 mi)
- Winning time: 4h 37' 52"

Results
	Winner	Biniam Girmay (ERI)	(Intermarché–Wanty)
	Second	Axel Zingle (FRA)	(Cofidis)
	Third	Marc Hirschi (SUI)	(UAE Team Emirates)

The 2024 Circuit Franco-Belge was the 83rd edition of the Circuit Franco–Belge and the eighth edition since it became a one-day race. It was held on 29 May 2024 as part of the 2024 UCI ProSeries calendar.

== Teams ==
Six UCI WorldTeams, eleven UCI ProTeams, and four UCI Continental teams made up the 21 teams that participated in the race.

UCI WorldTeams

- Alpecin–Deceuninck
- Arkéa–B&B Hotels
- Cofidis
- Intermarché–Wanty
- Soudal–Quick-Step
- UAE Team Emirates

UCI ProTeams

- Bingoal WB
- Caja Rural–Seguros RGA
- Equipo Kern Pharma
- Israel–Premier Tech
- Lotto–Dstny
- Q36.5 Pro Cycling Team
- TDT–Unibet Cycling Team
- Team Flanders–Baloise
- Team Novo Nordisk
- Team TotalEnergies
- Uno-X Mobility

UCI Continental Teams

- Parkhotel Valkenburg
- Philippe Wagner–Bazin
- Tarteletto–Isorex
- Van Rysel–Roubaix

== Result ==
Result
Rank	Rider	Team	Time
1	Biniam Girmay (ERI)	Intermarché–Wanty	4h 37' 52"
2	Axel Zingle (FRA)	Cofidis	+ 0"
3	Marc Hirschi (SUI)	UAE Team Emirates	+ 0"
4	Jenno Berckmoes (BEL)	Lotto–Dstny	+ 0"
5	Emilien Jeannière (FRA)	Team TotalEnergies	+ 0"
6	Vincenzo Albanese (ITA)	Arkéa–B&B Hotels	+ 0"
7	Pau Miquel (ESP)	Equipo Kern Pharma	+ 0"
8	Matyáš Kopecký (CZE)	Team Novo Nordisk	+ 0"
9	Eduard Prades (ESP)	Caja Rural–Seguros RGA	+ 0"
10	Kaden Groves (AUS)	Alpecin–Deceuninck	+ 0"
