= 2024 Grand Prix de Fourmies =

2024 UCI ProSeries

Race details
- Dates: 8 September 2024
- Stages: 1
- Distance: 197.7 km (122.8 mi)
- Winning time: 4h 29' 07"

Results
	Winner	Arvid de Kleijn (NED)	(Tudor Pro Cycling Team)
	Second	Gerben Thijssen (BEL)	(Intermarché–Wanty)
	Third	Søren Wærenskjold (NOR)	(Uno-X Mobility)

The 2024 Grand Prix de Fourmies was the 91st edition of the Grand Prix de Fourmies, a one-day road cycling race in and around Fourmies in northern France. It was also the fifteenth event of the 2024 French Road Cycling Cup.

== Teams ==
Seven of the eighteen UCI WorldTeams, nine UCI ProTeams, and four UCI Continental teams made up the twenty teams that participated in the race.

UCI WorldTeams

- Alpecin–Deceuninck
- Arkéa–B&B Hotels
- Cofidis
- Decathlon–AG2R La Mondiale
- Groupama–FDJ
- Intermarché–Wanty
- Team Jayco–AlUla

UCI ProTeams

- Bingoal WB
- Euskaltel–Euskadi
- Lotto–Dstny
- Team Corratec–Vini Fantini
- Team Flanders–Baloise
- Polti–Kometa
- Team TotalEnergies
- Tudor Pro Cycling Team
- Uno-X Mobility

UCI Continental Teams

- CIC U Nantes Atlantique
- Nice Métropole Côte d'Azur
- St. Michel–Mavic–Auber93
- Van Rysel–Roubaix

== Result ==
Result
Rank	Rider	Team	Time
1	Arvid de Kleijn (NED)	Tudor Pro Cycling Team	4h 29' 07"
2	Gerben Thijssen (BEL)	Intermarché–Wanty	+ 0"
3	Søren Wærenskjold (NOR)	Uno-X Mobility	+ 0"
4	Milan Fretin (BEL)	Cofidis	+ 0"
5	Hugo Page (FRA)	Intermarché–Wanty	+ 0"
6	Jensen Plowright (AUS)	Alpecin–Deceuninck	+ 0"
7	Emilien Jeannière (FRA)	Team TotalEnergies	+ 0"
8	Jon Aberasturi (ESP)	Euskaltel–Euskadi	+ 0"
9	Gianluca Pollefliet (BEL)	Decathlon–AG2R La Mondiale	+ 0"
10	Laurence Pithie (NZL)	Groupama–FDJ	+ 0"
