= Tobias Lund Andresen =

Danish cyclist (born 2002)

Tobias Lund
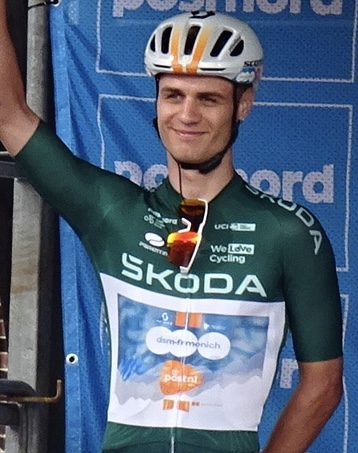
- Lund in 2024

Personal information
- Born: 20 August 2002 (age 24) Taastrup, Denmark
- Height: 1.81 m (5 ft 11 in)
- Weight: 69 kg (152 lb)

Cycling career
- Sport: Cycling
- Current team: Decathlon CMA CGM Team
- Disciplines: Road; Track
- Role: Sprinter

Amateur teams
- 2013–2018: Cykleklubben FIX Rødovre
- 2019–2020: Team NPV–Carl Ras Roskilde Junior

Professional teams
- 2021–2022: Development Team DSM
- 2023–2025: Team dsm–firmenich
- 2026–: Decathlon CMA CGM

Major wins
- One-day races and Classics Great Ocean Road Race (2026)

Tobias Lund Andresen (born 20 August 2002) is a Danish professional cyclist who rides for UCI WorldTeam Decathlon CMA CGM Team.

== Career ==
=== DSM (2021–2025) ===
After winning several high level races as a junior, Lund joined UCI Continental team Development Team DSM in 2021 for his first two years at the under-23 level. That season, he won stage seven of the Tour de Bretagne, his first senior level win. In 2023, he was promoted to the professional squad, finishing second in the Brussels Cycling Classic, a UCI ProSeries event. In his second season with the team, he took his first pro win in a sprint finish on stage four of the Tour of Turkey, also taking the race lead. He repeated this result the following day on stage five and again on stage seven.

=== Decathlon CMA CGM ===
Lund joined Decathlon CMA CGM for the 2026 season. He began the season strongly, winning a stage and the points classification at the Tour Down Under before taking victory at the Cadel Evans Great Ocean Road Race. On 11 March, he won stage three of Tirreno–Adriatico, prevailing in a mass sprint ahead of Jasper Philipsen, Jonathan Milan, Arnaud De Lie and Paul Magnier.

== Major results ==
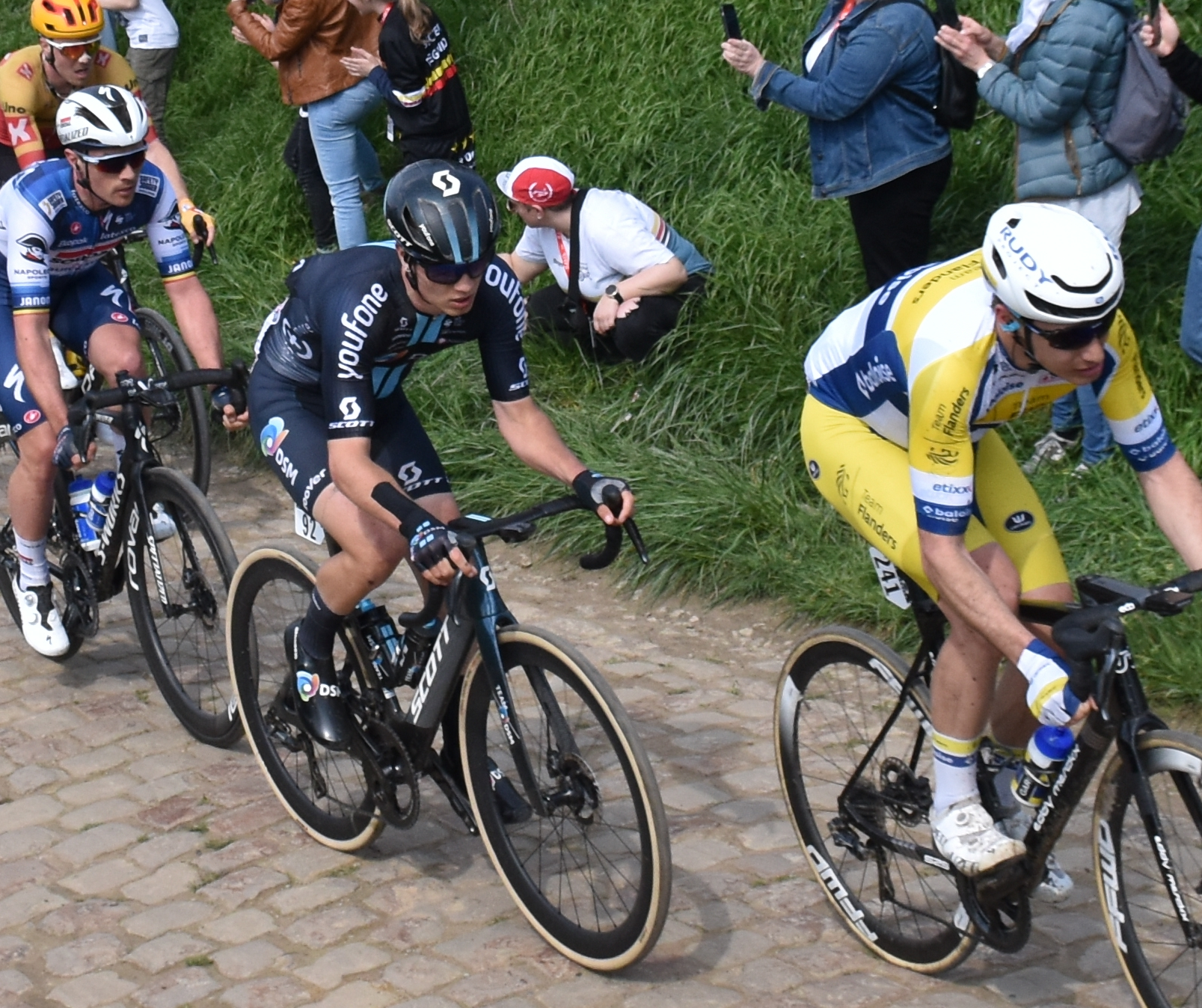
Paris-Roubaix 2023 - Secteur pavé de Quiévy à Saint-Python - N° 92 Lund Tobias Andresen.

=== Road ===
2019
1st E3 BinckBank Classic Junioren
2nd Tour of Flanders Juniors
2020
1st Road race, National Junior Championships
1st Overall Visegrad 4 Juniors

1st Stages 1, 2a (ITT), 2b & 3

Grand Prix Rüebliland

1st Points classification
1st Stages 2 & 3

2021
1st Stage 7 Tour de Bretagne
2022
9th Paris–Tours Espoirs
2023
2nd Brussels Cycling Classic
2nd Ronde van Drenthe
2024 (6 pro wins)
Tour of Turkey

1st Points classification
1st Stages 4, 5 & 7

Danmark Rundt

1st Points classification
1st Stages 1 (TTT), 3 & 5

2nd Overall CRO Race

1st Points classification
1st Young rider classification
1st Stage 4

2025 (1)
1st Surf Coast Classic
2nd Coppa Bernocchi
4th Overall Four Days of Dunkirk

1st Points classification

4th Overall Tour of Norway
5th Copenhagen Sprint
7th Classique Dunkerque
9th Bretagne Classic
2026 (3)
1st Cadel Evans Great Ocean Road Race
Tour Down Under

1st Points classification
1st Stage 1

1st Stage 3 Tirreno–Adriatico
2nd Gent–Wevelgem
2nd Copenhagen Sprint
6th Omloop Het Nieuwsblad
6th E3 Saxo Classic
7th Kuurne–Brussels–Kuurne

==== Grand Tour general classification results timeline ====
Grand Tour	2024	2025	2026
Giro d'Italia	140	—	122
Tour de France	—	96	—
Vuelta a España	—	—	—

==== Classics results timeline ====
Monument	2022	2023	2024	2025	2026
Milan–San Remo	—	—	—	—	13
Tour of Flanders	—	—	—	—	—
Paris–Roubaix	—	DNF	—	—	—
Liège–Bastogne–Liège	—	—	—	—	—
Giro di Lombardia	—	—	—	—	—
Classic	2022	2023	2024	2025	2026
Great Ocean Road Race	—	—	—	15	1
Omloop Het Nieuwsblad	—	—	—	—	6
Kuurne–Brussels–Kuurne	120	—	—	—	7
E3 Saxo Classic	—	—	DNF	—	6
Gent–Wevelgem	—	DNF	—	DNF	2
Copenhagen Sprint	Race did not exist			5	2
Brussels Cycling Classic	—	2	—	25	—
Hamburg Cyclassics	—	—	11	13	—
Bretagne Classic	—	—	118	9	—
Coppa Bernocchi	—	—	—	2	—

Legend
—	Did not compete
DNF	Did not finish

=== Track ===
2019
1st Team pursuit, National Championships
2020
1st Madison, UEC European Junior Championships (with Kasper Andersen)
