= 2024 UCI ProSeries =

International road cycling contest

- Fifth edition of the UCI ProSeries

Details
- Dates: 31 January – 20 October
- Location: Asia, Europe, United States
- Races: 55

The 2024 UCI ProSeries was the fifth season of the UCI ProSeries, the second tier road cycling tour, below the UCI World Tour, but above the various regional UCI Continental Circuits.

The calendar consisted of 55 events, of which 33 are one-day races (1.Pro), and 22 are stage races (2.Pro). There were 49 events in Europe, five in Asia, and one in the United States.

== Events ==
Races in the 2024 UCI ProSeries
Race	Date	Winner	Team	Ref.
(Spain) Volta a la Comunitat Valenciana	31 January – 4 February	Brandon McNulty (USA)	UAE Team Emirates	
(Portugal) Figueira Champions Classic	10 February	Remco Evenepoel (BEL)	Soudal–Quick-Step	
Tour of Oman	10–14 February	Adam Yates (GBR)	UAE Team Emirates	
(Spain) Clásica de Almería	11 February	Olav Kooij (NED)	Visma–Lease a Bike	
(Spain) Vuelta a Andalucía	16 February (Note: Stage 1,2,4 and 5 were cancelled due to lack of Guardia Civil officers due to farmers' demonstrations.)	No winner		
(Portugal) Volta ao Algarve	14–18 February	Remco Evenepoel (BEL)	Soudal–Quick-Step	
(France) Faun-Ardèche Classic	24 February	Juan Ayuso (ESP)	UAE Team Emirates	
(France) Faun Drôme Classic	25 February	Marc Hirschi (SUI)	UAE Team Emirates	
(Belgium) Kuurne–Brussels–Kuurne	25 February	Wout van Aert (BEL)	Visma–Lease a Bike	
(Italy) Trofeo Laigueglia	28 February	Lenny Martinez (FRA)	Groupama–FDJ	
(Belgium) Nokere Koerse	13 March	Tim Merlier (BEL)	Soudal–Quick-Step	
(Italy) Milano–Torino	13 March	Alberto Bettiol (ITA)	EF Education–EasyPost	
(France) GP de Denain	14 March	Jannik Steimle (GER)	Q36.5 Pro Cycling Team	
(Belgium) Bredene Koksijde Classic	15 March	Luca Mozzato (ITA)	Arkéa–B&B Hotels	
(Spain) GP Miguel Induráin	30 March	Brandon McNulty (USA)	UAE Team Emirates	
(Belgium) Scheldeprijs	3 April	Tim Merlier (BEL)	Soudal–Quick-Step	
(Belgium) Brabantse Pijl	10 April	Benoît Cosnefroy (FRA)	Decathlon–AG2R La Mondiale	
(Italy) Tour of the Alps	15–19 April	Juan Pedro López (ESP)	Lidl–Trek	
(Turkey) Tour of Turkiye	21–28 April	Frank van den Broek (NED)	Team dsm–firmenich PostNL	
(France) GP du Morbihan	4 May	Benoît Cosnefroy (FRA)	Decathlon–AG2R La Mondiale	
(France) Tro-Bro Léon	5 May	Arnaud De Lie (BEL)	Lotto–Dstny	
(Hungary) Tour de Hongrie	8–12 May	Thibau Nys (BEL)	Lidl–Trek	
(France) Four Days of Dunkirk	14–19 May	Sam Bennett (IRL)	Decathlon–AG2R La Mondiale	
Tour of Norway	23–26 May	Axel Laurance (FRA)	Alpecin–Deceuninck	
(France) Boucles de la Mayenne	23–26 May	Alberto Bettiol (ITA)	EF Education–EasyPost	
(Belgium) Circuit Franco–Belge	29 May	Biniam Girmay (ERI)	Intermarché–Wanty	
(Belgium) Brussels Cycling Classic	2 June	Jonas Abrahamsen (NOR)	Uno-X Mobility	
(Belgium) Dwars door het Hageland	8 June	Gianni Vermeersch (BEL)	Alpecin–Deceuninck	
Tour of Slovenia	12–16 June	Giovanni Aleotti (ITA)	Bora–Hansgrohe	
Tour of Belgium	12–16 June	Søren Wærenskjold (NOR)	Uno-X Mobility	
(China) Tour of Qinghai Lake	7–14 July	Jefferson Alveiro Cepeda (ECU)	Caja Rural–Seguros RGA	
(Belgium) Tour de Wallonie	22–26 July	Matteo Trentin (ITA)	Tudor Pro Cycling Team	
Arctic Race of Norway	4–7 August	Magnus Cort (DEN)	Uno-X Mobility	
(Spain) Vuelta a Burgos	5–9 August	Sepp Kuss (USA)	Visma–Lease a Bike	
Tour of Denmark	14–18 August	Arnaud De Lie (BEL)	Lotto–Dstny	
(Germany) Deutschland Tour	21–25 August	Mads Pedersen (DEN)	Lidl–Trek	
(China) Tour of Hainan	27–31 August	Aaron Gate (NZL)	Burgos BH	
(United States) Maryland Cycling Classic	1 September	Cancelled		
(United Kingdom) Tour of Britain	3–8 September	Stephen Williams (GBR)	Israel–Premier Tech	
(France) GP de Fourmies	8 September	Arvid de Kleijn (NED)	Tudor Pro Cycling Team	
(Italy) GP Industria & Artigianato	8 September	Marc Hirschi (SUI)	UAE Team Emirates	
(Italy) Coppa Sabatini	12 September	Marc Hirschi (SUI)	UAE Team Emirates	
(Belgium) GP de Wallonie	18 September	Roger Adrià (ESP)	Red Bull–Bora–Hansgrohe	
Tour de Luxembourg	18–22 September	Antonio Tiberi (ITA)	Team Bahrain Victorious	
(Belgium) Super 8 Classic	21 September	Filippo Baroncini (ITA)	UAE Team Emirates	
(Malaysia) Tour de Langkawi	29 September – 6 October	Max Poole (GBR)	Team dsm–firmenich PostNL	
(Germany) Münsterland Giro	3 October	Jasper Philipsen (BEL)	Alpecin–Deceuninck	
(Italy) Giro dell'Emilia	5 October	Tadej Pogačar (SLO)	UAE Team Emirates	
(France) Paris–Tours	6 October	Christophe Laporte (FRA)	Visma–Lease a Bike	
(Italy) Coppa Bernocchi	7 October	Stan Van Tricht (BEL)	Alpecin–Deceuninck	
(Italy) Tre Valli Varesine	8 October	Cancelled		
(China) Tour of Taihu Lake	9–13 October	Jelte Krijnsen (NED)	Parkhotel Valkenburg	
(Italy) Gran Piemonte	10 October	Neilson Powless (USA)	EF Education–EasyPost	
(Italy) Giro del Veneto	16 October	Corbin Strong (NZL)	Israel–Premier Tech	
(Italy) Veneto Classic	20 October	Magnus Cort (DEN)	Uno-X Mobility	
Japan Cup	20 October	Neilson Powless (USA)	EF Education–EasyPost	
