= Alexander Hajek =

Austrian bicycle racer

- Hajek in 2026

Personal information
- Born: 19 July 2003 (age 23) Austria

Cycling career
- Sport: Cycling
- Current team: Red Bull–Bora–Hansgrohe
- Discipline: Road
- Role: Rider

Amateur team
- 2021: Team Auto Eder

Professional teams
- 2022: Trinity Racing
- 2023: Tirol KTM Cycling Team
- 2024–: Bora–Hansgrohe

Major wins
- One-day races and Classics National Road Race Championships (2024)

Alexander Hajek (born 19 July 2003) is an Austrian professional racing cyclist, who currently rides for UCI WorldTeam Red Bull–Bora–Hansgrohe. Hajek signed a three-year deal with Bora–Hansgrohe starting from 2024.

== Major results ==
2021
1st Stage 2a (TTT) Aubel-Thimister-Stavelot
2nd Overall Internationale Juniorenrundfahrt

1st Points classification
1st Stage 3

4th TF GD Dorigo MO Biemmereti MO Ettore e Cristiano Floriani MO Emilio Mazzero
5th Overall Ain Bugey Valromey Tour
5th Road race, UCI Junior Road World Championships
6th Overall LVM Saarland Trofeo

1st Stages 3b & 4

6th Grand Prix West Bohemia
9th Junior European road race championships
2022
3rd Overall Carpathian Couriers Race
2023
3rd GP Gorenjska
3rd Mühlviertler Hügelwelt Classic
4th Internationales ÖRV Radliga Raiffeisenbank Kirschblütenrenn
7th Trofeo Banca Popolare di Vicenza
9th Giro del Belvedere
9th Flèche Ardennaise
10th Overall Orlen Nations Grand Prix
10th Radsaison-Eröffnungsennen Leonding
2024 (1 pro win)
1st Road race, National Road Championships
7th Overall Tour of Turkey
10th Coppa Sabatini
2025
4th Overall Tour de Hongrie
8th Overall Czech Tour
10th Overall CRO Race
10th Trofeo Matteotti
