= 2024 Giro del Veneto =

2024 UCI ProSeries

Race details
- Dates: 16 October 2024
- Stages: 1
- Distance: 165.35 km (102.7 mi)
- Winning time: 3h 50' 03"

Results
	Winner	Corbin Strong (NZL)	(Israel–Premier Tech)
	Second	Xandro Meurisse (BEL)	(Alpecin–Deceuninck)
	Third	Romain Grégoire (FRA)	(Groupama–FDJ)

The 2024 Giro del Veneto was the 87th edition of the Giro del Veneto road cycling one day race, which was held on 16 October 2024 as part of the 2024 UCI ProSeries calendar.

== Teams ==
Nine UCI WorldTeams, six UCI ProTeams and three UCI Continental teams made up the twenty-four teams that participated in the race.

UCI WorldTeams

- Alpecin–Deceuninck
- Arkéa–B&B Hotels
- Astana Qazaqstan Team
- Cofidis
- Groupama–FDJ
- Intermarché–Wanty
- Movistar Team
- Team Jayco–AlUla
- UAE Team Emirates

UCI ProTeams

- Israel–Premier Tech
- Q36.5 Pro Cycling Team
- Polti–Kometa
- Team Corratec–Vini Fantini
- Uno-X Mobility
- VF Group–Bardiani–CSF–Faizanè

UCI Continental Teams

- Biesse–Carrera
- General Store–Essegibi–Fratelli Curia
- MG.K vis Colors for Peace

== Results ==
Result
Rank	Rider	Team	Time
1	Corbin Strong (NZL)	Israel–Premier Tech	3h 50' 03"
2	Xandro Meurisse (BEL)	Alpecin–Deceuninck	+ 0"
3	Romain Grégoire (FRA)	Groupama–FDJ	+ 0"
4	Davide De Pretto (ITA)	Team Jayco–AlUla	+ 3"
5	Marc Hirschi (SUI)	UAE Team Emirates	+ 4"
6	Mattia Bais (ITA)	Polti–Kometa	+ 4"
7	Lorenzo Rota (ITA)	Intermarché–Wanty	+ 5"
8	Filippo Fiorelli (ITA)	VF Group–Bardiani–CSF–Faizanè	+ 5"
9	Davide Toneatti (ITA)	Astana Qazaqstan Team	+ 5"
10	Tobias Halland Johannessen (NOR)	Uno-X Mobility	+ 5"
