= 2024 Presidential Tour of Turkey =

Cycling race

2024 UCI ProSeries

Race details
- Dates: 21–28 April 2024
- Stages: 8
- Distance: 1,179.4 km (732.8 mi)
- Winning time: 25h 53' 09"

Results
Jersey awarded to the overall winner	Winner	Frank van den Broek (NED)	(Team dsm–firmenich PostNL)
	Second	Merhawi Kudus (ERI)	(Terengganu Cycling Team)
	Third	Paul Double (GBR)	(Polti–Kometa)
Jersey awarded to the points classification winner	Points	Tobias Lund Andresen (DEN)	(Team dsm–firmenich PostNL)
Jersey awarded to the mountains classification winner	Mountains	Vinzent Dorn (GER)	(Bike Aid)
Jersey awarded to the sprints classification winner	Sprints	Vinzent Dorn (GER)	(Bike Aid)
	Team	(Switzerland) Q36.5 Pro Cycling Team	

The 2024 Presidential Tour of Turkey is a road cycling stage race that is being held between 21 and 28 April 2024 in Turkey. It is the 59th edition of the Presidential Tour of Turkey.

== Teams ==
Four UCI WorldTeams, nine UCI ProTeams, and twelve UCI Continental teams made up the 25 teams that participate in the race.

UCI WorldTeams

- Alpecin–Deceuninck
- Astana Qazaqstan Team
- Bora–Hansgrohe
- Team dsm–firmenich PostNL

UCI ProTeams

- Bingoal WB
- Burgos BH
- Caja Rural–Seguros RGA
- Polti–Kometa
- Q36.5 Pro Cycling Team
- TDT–Unibet Cycling Team
- Team Corratec–Vini Fantini
- Team Novo Nordisk
- VF Group–Bardiani–CSF–Faizanè

UCI Continental Teams

- Adria Mobil
- Istanbul Büyükșehir Belediye Spor Türkiye
- Bike Aid
- China Glory–Mentech Continental Cycling Team
- Kinan Racing Team
- Konya Büyükşehir Belediyespor
- Mazowsze Serce Polski
- Rembe Pro Cycling Team Sauerland
- Sakarya BB Pro Team
- Spor Toto Cycling Team
- Tarteletto–Isorex
- Terengganu Cycling Team

== Route ==
Stage characteristics and winners
Stage	Date	Course	Distance	Type	Stage winner
1	21 April	Antalya to Antalya	134.7 km (83.7 mi)	Flat stage	Fabio Jakobsen (NED)
2	22 April	Kemer to Kaş	190.6 km (118.4 mi)	Medium-mountain stage	Max Kanter (GER)
3	23 April	Fethiye to Marmaris	147.4 km (91.6 mi)	Hilly stage	Giovanni Lonardi (ITA)
4	24 April	Marmaris to Bodrum	137.9 km (85.7 mi)	Medium-mountain stage	Tobias Lund Andresen (DEN)
5	25 April	Bodrum to Kuşadası	177.9 km (110.5 mi)	Hilly stage	Tobias Lund Andresen (DEN)
6	26 April	Kuşadası to Manisa	160.1 km (99.5 mi)	Mountain stage	Frank van den Broek (NED)
7	27 April	İzmir to İzmir	125.4 km (77.9 mi)	Hilly stage	Tobias Lund Andresen (DEN)
8	28 April	Istanbul to Istanbul	105.4 km (65.5 mi)	Medium-mountain stage	Stage neutralized
Total			1,179.4 km (732.8 mi)		

== Stages ==
=== Stage 1 ===
21 April 2024 — Antalya to Antalya, 134.7 km (83.7 mi)

Stage 1 Result
Rank	Rider	Team	Time
1	Fabio Jakobsen (NED)	Team dsm–firmenich PostNL	2h 56' 14"
2	Sasha Weemaes (BEL)	Bingoal WB	+ 0"
3	Simon Dehairs (BEL)	Alpecin–Deceuninck	+ 0"
4	Giovanni Lonardi (ITA)	Polti–Kometa	+ 0"
5	Léo Bouvier (FRA)	Bike Aid	+ 0"
6	Daniel Babor (CZE)	Caja Rural–Seguros RGA	+ 0"
7	Jensen Plowright (AUS)	Alpecin–Deceuninck	+ 0"
8	Davide Persico (ITA)	Bingoal WB	+ 0"
9	Reinardt Janse van Rensburg (RSA)	China Glory–Mentech Continental Cycling Team	+ 0"
10	Timothy Dupont (BEL)	Tarteletto–Isorex	+ 0"

General classification after Stage 1
Rank	Rider	Team	Time
1	Fabio Jakobsen (NED)	Team dsm–firmenich PostNL	2h 56' 04"
2	Sasha Weemaes (BEL)	Bingoal WB	+ 4"
3	Simon Dehairs (BEL)	Alpecin–Deceuninck	+ 6"
4	Tomasz Budziński (POL)	Mazowsze Serce Polski	+ 8"
5	Filippo Ridolfo (ITA)	Team Novo Nordisk	+ 9"
6	Giovanni Lonardi (ITA)	Polti–Kometa	+ 10"
7	Léo Bouvier (FRA)	Bike Aid	+ 10"
8	Daniel Babor (CZE)	Caja Rural–Seguros RGA	+ 10"
9	Jensen Plowright (AUS)	Alpecin–Deceuninck	+ 10"
10	Davide Persico (ITA)	Bingoal WB	+ 10"

=== Stage 2 ===
22 April 2024 — Kemer to Kaş, 190.6 km (118.4 mi)

Stage 2 Result
Rank	Rider	Team	Time
1	Max Kanter (GER)	Astana Qazaqstan Team	4h 43' 16"
2	Henri Uhlig (GER)	Alpecin–Deceuninck	+ 0"
3	Tobias Lund Andresen (DEN)	Team dsm–firmenich PostNL	+ 0"
4	Davide Ballerini (ITA)	Astana Qazaqstan Team	+ 0"
5	Giovanni Lonardi (ITA)	Polti–Kometa	+ 0"
6	David González (ESP)	Caja Rural–Seguros RGA	+ 0"
7	Lyu Xianjing (CHN)	China Glory–Mentech Continental Cycling Team	+ 0"
8	Danny van Poppel (NED)	Bora–Hansgrohe	+ 0"
9	Rory Townsend (IRL)	Q36.5 Pro Cycling Team	+ 0"
10	Marcin Budziński (POL)	Mazowsze Serce Polski	+ 0"

General classification after Stage 2
Rank	Rider	Team	Time
1	Henri Uhlig (GER)	Alpecin–Deceuninck	7h 39' 24"
2	Tobias Lund Andresen (DEN)	Team dsm–firmenich PostNL	+ 2"
3	David Lozano (ESP)	Team Novo Nordisk	+ 3"
4	Tomasz Budziński (POL)	Mazowsze Serce Polski	+ 4"
5	Giovanni Lonardi (ITA)	Polti–Kometa	+ 6"
6	Davide Ballerini (ITA)	Astana Qazaqstan Team	+ 6"
7	Rory Townsend (IRL)	Q36.5 Pro Cycling Team	+ 6"
8	Merhawi Kudus (ERI)	Terengganu Cycling Team	+ 6"
9	Matyáš Kopecký (CZE)	Team Novo Nordisk	+ 6"
10	Kenneth Van Rooy (BEL)	Bingoal WB	+ 6"

=== Stage 3 ===
23 April 2024 — Fethiye to Marmaris, 147.4 km (91.6 mi)

Stage 3 Result
Rank	Rider	Team	Time
1	Giovanni Lonardi (ITA)	Polti–Kometa	3h 24' 57"
2	Enrico Zanoncello (ITA)	VF Group–Bardiani–CSF–Faizanè	+ 0"
3	Max Kanter (GER)	Astana Qazaqstan Team	+ 0"
4	Matyáš Kopecký (CZE)	Team Novo Nordisk	+ 0"
5	Iúri Leitão (POR)	Caja Rural–Seguros RGA	+ 0"
6	Henri Uhlig (GER)	Alpecin–Deceuninck	+ 0"
7	Sebastián Mora (ESP)	Burgos BH	+ 0"
8	Kenneth Van Rooy (BEL)	Bingoal WB	+ 0"
9	Merhawi Kudus (ERI)	Terengganu Cycling Team	+ 0"
10	Rory Townsend (IRL)	Q36.5 Pro Cycling Team	+ 0"

General classification after Stage 3
Rank	Rider	Team	Time
1	Giovanni Lonardi (ITA)	Polti–Kometa	11h 04' 17"
2	Enrico Zanoncello (ITA)	VF Group–Bardiani–CSF–Faizanè	+ 4"
3	Henri Uhlig (GER)	Alpecin–Deceuninck	+ 4"
4	Tobias Lund Andresen (DEN)	Team dsm–firmenich PostNL	+ 6"
5	Filippo Conca (ITA)	Q36.5 Pro Cycling Team	+ 7"
6	David Lozano (ESP)	Team Novo Nordisk	+ 7"
7	Tomasz Budziński (POL)	Mazowsze Serce Polski	+ 8"
8	Willie Smit (RSA)	China Glory–Mentech Continental Cycling Team	+ 9"
9	Rory Townsend (IRL)	Q36.5 Pro Cycling Team	+ 10"
10	Merhawi Kudus (ERI)	Terengganu Cycling Team	+ 10"

=== Stage 4 ===
24 April 2024 — Marmaris to Bodrum, 137.9 km (85.7 mi)

Stage 4 Result
Rank	Rider	Team	Time
1	Tobias Lund Andresen (DEN)	Team dsm–firmenich PostNL	3h 29' 42"
2	Danny van Poppel (NED)	Bora–Hansgrohe	+ 0"
3	Henri Uhlig (GER)	Alpecin–Deceuninck	+ 0"
4	Sebastian Nielsen (DEN)	TDT–Unibet Cycling Team	+ 0"
5	Matyáš Kopecký (CZE)	Team Novo Nordisk	+ 0"
6	Max Kanter (GER)	Astana Qazaqstan Team	+ 0"
7	Thomas Joseph (BEL)	Tarteletto–Isorex	+ 0"
8	Lander Loockx (BEL)	TDT–Unibet Cycling Team	+ 0"
9	Merhawi Kudus (ERI)	Terengganu Cycling Team	+ 0"
10	Marco Tizza (ITA)	Bingoal WB	+ 0"

General classification after Stage 4
Rank	Rider	Team	Time
1	Tobias Lund Andresen (DEN)	Team dsm–firmenich PostNL	14h 33' 55"
2	Giovanni Lonardi (ITA)	Polti–Kometa	+ 4"
3	Henri Uhlig (GER)	Alpecin–Deceuninck	+ 4"
4	Danny van Poppel (NED)	Bora–Hansgrohe	+ 8"
5	Filippo Conca (ITA)	Q36.5 Pro Cycling Team	+ 11"
6	David Lozano (ESP)	Team Novo Nordisk	+ 11"
7	Tomasz Budziński (POL)	Mazowsze Serce Polski	+ 12"
8	Willie Smit (RSA)	China Glory–Mentech Continental Cycling Team	+ 13"
9	Manuele Tarozzi (ITA)	VF Group–Bardiani–CSF–Faizanè	+ 13"
10	Merhawi Kudus (ERI)	Terengganu Cycling Team	+ 14"

=== Stage 5 ===
25 April 2024 — Bodrum to Kuşadası, 177.9 km (110.5 mi)

Stage 5 Result
Rank	Rider	Team	Time
1	Tobias Lund Andresen (DEN)	Team dsm–firmenich PostNL	4h 18' 12"
2	Fabio Jakobsen (NED)	Team dsm–firmenich PostNL	+ 0"
3	Iúri Leitão (POR)	Caja Rural–Seguros RGA	+ 0"
4	Martijn Budding (NED)	TDT–Unibet Cycling Team	+ 0"
5	Jensen Plowright (AUS)	Alpecin–Deceuninck	+ 0"
6	Reinardt Janse van Rensburg (RSA)	China Glory–Mentech Continental Cycling Team	+ 0"
7	Giovanni Lonardi (ITA)	Polti–Kometa	+ 4"
8	Danny van Poppel (NED)	Bora–Hansgrohe	+ 0"
9	Andrea Peron (ITA)	Team Novo Nordisk	+ 0"
10	Rory Townsend (IRL)	Q36.5 Pro Cycling Team	+ 0"

General classification after Stage 5
Rank	Rider	Team	Time
1	Tobias Lund Andresen (DEN)	Team dsm–firmenich PostNL	18h 51' 57"
2	Giovanni Lonardi (ITA)	Polti–Kometa	+ 14"
3	Henri Uhlig (GER)	Alpecin–Deceuninck	+ 14"
4	Danny van Poppel (NED)	Bora–Hansgrohe	+ 18"
5	Filippo Conca (ITA)	Q36.5 Pro Cycling Team	+ 21"
6	David Lozano (ESP)	Team Novo Nordisk	+ 21"
7	Tomasz Budziński (POL)	Mazowsze Serce Polski	+ 22"
8	Willie Smit (RSA)	China Glory–Mentech Continental Cycling Team	+ 23"
9	Manuele Tarozzi (ITA)	VF Group–Bardiani–CSF–Faizanè	+ 23"
10	Merhawi Kudus (ERI)	Terengganu Cycling Team	+ 24"

=== Stage 6 ===
26 April 2024 — Kuşadası to Manisa, 160.1 km (99.5 mi)

Stage 6 Result
Rank	Rider	Team	Time
1	Frank van den Broek (NED)	Team dsm–firmenich PostNL	4h 10' 00"
2	Merhawi Kudus (ERI)	Terengganu Cycling Team	+ 0"
3	Paul Double (GBR)	Polti–Kometa	+ 3"
4	Metkel Eyob (ERI)	Terengganu Cycling Team	+ 14"
5	Harold Martín López (ECU)	Astana Qazaqstan Team	+ 14"
6	Mario Aparicio (ESP)	Burgos BH	+ 16"
7	Lander Loockx (BEL)	TDT–Unibet Cycling Team	+ 16"
8	Carl Fredrik Hagen (NOR)	Q36.5 Pro Cycling Team	+ 16"
9	Alexander Hajek (AUT)	Bora–Hansgrohe	+ 16"
10	Vadim Pronskiy (KAZ)	Astana Qazaqstan Team	+ 34"

General classification after Stage 6
Rank	Rider	Team	Time
1	Frank van den Broek (NED)	Team dsm–firmenich PostNL	23h 02' 11"
2	Merhawi Kudus (ERI)	Terengganu Cycling Team	+ 4"
3	Paul Double (GBR)	Polti–Kometa	+ 9"
4	Metkel Eyob (ERI)	Terengganu Cycling Team	+ 24"
5	Harold Martín López (ECU)	Astana Qazaqstan Team	+ 24"
6	Lander Loockx (BEL)	TDT–Unibet Cycling Team	+ 26"
7	Alexander Hajek (AUT)	Bora–Hansgrohe	+ 26"
8	Mario Aparicio (ESP)	Burgos BH	+ 26"
9	Carl Fredrik Hagen (NOR)	Q36.5 Pro Cycling Team	+ 26"
10	Victor Langellotti (MON)	Burgos BH	+ 44"

=== Stage 7 ===
27 April 2024 — İzmir to İzmir, 125.4 km (77.9 mi)

Stage 7 Result
Rank	Rider	Team	Time
1	Tobias Lund Andresen (DEN)	Team dsm–firmenich PostNL	2h 50' 58"
2	Timothy Dupont (BEL)	Tarteletto–Isorex	+ 0"
3	Manuel Peñalver (ESP)	Polti–Kometa	+ 0"
4	Sasha Weemaes (BEL)	Bingoal WB	+ 0"
5	Sergey Rostovtsev	Sakarya BB Pro Team	+ 0"
6	Fabio Jakobsen (NED)	Team dsm–firmenich PostNL	+ 0"
7	Enrico Zanoncello (ITA)	VF Group–Bardiani–CSF–Faizanè	+ 0"
8	Marcin Budziński (POL)	Mazowsze Serce Polski	+ 0"
9	Mattia Pinazzi (ITA)	VF Group–Bardiani–CSF–Faizanè	+ 0"
10	Sebastian Nielsen (DEN)	TDT–Unibet Cycling Team	+ 0"

General classification after Stage 7
Rank	Rider	Team	Time
1	Frank van den Broek (NED)	Team dsm–firmenich PostNL	25h 53' 09"
2	Merhawi Kudus (ERI)	Terengganu Cycling Team	+ 4"
3	Paul Double (GBR)	Polti–Kometa	+ 9"
4	Metkel Eyob (ERI)	Terengganu Cycling Team	+ 24"
5	Harold Martín López (ECU)	Astana Qazaqstan Team	+ 24"
6	Lander Loockx (BEL)	TDT–Unibet Cycling Team	+ 26"
7	Alexander Hajek (AUT)	Bora–Hansgrohe	+ 26"
8	Mario Aparicio (ESP)	Burgos BH	+ 26"
9	Carl Fredrik Hagen (NOR)	Q36.5 Pro Cycling Team	+ 26"
10	Victor Langellotti (MON)	Burgos BH	+ 44"

=== Stage 8 ===
28 April 2024 — Istanbul to Istanbul, 105.4 km (65.5 mi)

Stage 8 was neutralized due to bad weather.

== Classification leadership table ==
Classification leadership by stage
Stage	Winner	General classification	Points classification	Mountains classification	Turkish Beauties Sprints classification	Team classification
1	Fabio Jakobsen	Fabio Jakobsen	Fabio Jakobsen	Michał Pomorski	Vinzent Dorn	Alpecin–Deceuninck
2	Max Kanter	Henri Uhlig	Giovanni Lonardi	Samet Bulut	Vinzent Dorn	Q36.5 Pro Cycling Team
3	Giovanni Lonardi	Giovanni Lonardi	Giovanni Lonardi	Samet Bulut	Vinzent Dorn	VF Group–Bardiani–CSF–Faizanè
4	Tobias Lund Andresen	Tobias Lund Andresen	Giovanni Lonardi	Vinzent Dorn	Vinzent Dorn	Astana Qazaqstan Team
5	Tobias Lund Andresen	Tobias Lund Andresen	Giovanni Lonardi	Vinzent Dorn	Vinzent Dorn	Astana Qazaqstan Team
6	Frank van den Broek	Frank van den Broek	Giovanni Lonardi	Vinzent Dorn	Vinzent Dorn	Q36.5 Pro Cycling Team
7	Tobias Lund Andresen	Frank van den Broek	Tobias Lund Andresen	Vinzent Dorn	Vinzent Dorn	Q36.5 Pro Cycling Team
8	Stage neutralized	Frank van den Broek	Tobias Lund Andresen	Vinzent Dorn	Vinzent Dorn	Q36.5 Pro Cycling Team
Final		Frank van den Broek	Tobias Lund Andresen	Vinzent Dorn	Vinzent Dorn	Q36.5 Pro Cycling Team

== Classification standings ==
Legend
General classification	Denotes the winner of the general classification	Mountain classification	Denotes the winner of the mountains classification
Points classification	Denotes the winner of the points classification	Turkish Beauties Sprints classification	Denotes the winner of the Turkish Beauties Sprints classification

=== General classification ===
Final general classification (1–10)
Rank	Rider	Team	Time
1	Frank van den Broek (NED)	Team dsm–firmenich PostNL	25h 53' 09"
2	Merhawi Kudus (ERI)	Terengganu Cycling Team	+ 4"
3	Paul Double (GBR)	Polti–Kometa	+ 9"
4	Metkel Eyob (ERI)	Terengganu Cycling Team	+ 24"
5	Harold Martín López (ECU)	Astana Qazaqstan Team	+ 24"
6	Lander Loockx (BEL)	TDT–Unibet Cycling Team	+ 26"
7	Alexander Hajek (AUT)	Bora–Hansgrohe	+ 26"
8	Mario Aparicio (ESP)	Burgos BH	+ 26"
9	Carl Fredrik Hagen (NOR)	Q36.5 Pro Cycling Team	+ 26"
10	Victor Langellotti (MON)	Burgos BH	+ 44"

=== Points classification ===
Final points classification (1–10)
Rank	Rider	Team	Points
1	Tobias Lund Andresen (DEN)	Team dsm–firmenich PostNL	58
2	Giovanni Lonardi (ITA)	Polti–Kometa	48
3	Fabio Jakobsen (NED)	Team dsm–firmenich PostNL	44
4	Max Kanter (GER)	Astana Qazaqstan Team	38
5	Henri Uhlig (GER)	Alpecin–Deceuninck	37
6	Merhawi Kudus (ERI)	Terengganu Cycling Team	35
7	Iúri Leitão (POR)	Caja Rural–Seguros RGA	29
8	Timothy Dupont (BEL)	Tarteletto–Isorex	28
9	Enrico Zanoncello (ITA)	VF Group–Bardiani–CSF–Faizanè	26
10	Sasha Weemaes (BEL)	Bingoal WB	26

=== Mountains classification ===
Final mountains classification (1–10)
Rank	Rider	Team	Points
1	Vinzent Dorn (GER)	Bike Aid	15
2	Frank van den Broek (NED)	Team dsm–firmenich PostNL	8
3	Samet Bulut (TUR)	Istanbul Büyükșehir Belediye Spor Türkiye	7
4	Oliver Mattheis (GER)	Bike Aid	6
5	James Whelan (AUS)	Q36.5 Pro Cycling Team	6
6	Michał Pomorski (POL)	Mazowsze Serce Polski	6
7	Merhawi Kudus (ERI)	Terengganu Cycling Team	6
8	Petros Mengs (ERI)	Istanbul Büyükșehir Belediye Spor Türkiye	5
9	Paul Double (GBR)	Polti–Kometa	4
10	Lander Loockx (BEL)	TDT–Unibet Cycling Team	3

=== Turkish Beauties Sprints classification ===
Final Turkish Beauties Sprints classification (1–10)
Rank	Rider	Team	Points
1	Vinzent Dorn (GER)	Bike Aid	16
2	Konrad Czabok (POL)	Mazowsze Serce Polski	10
3	James Whelan (AUS)	Q36.5 Pro Cycling Team	6
4	Natnael Berhane (ERI)	Istanbul Büyükșehir Belediye Spor Türkiye	5
5	Feritcan Şamlı (TUR)	Spor Toto Cycling Team	5
6	Antoine Berlin (MON)	Bike Aid	3
7	Petros Mengs (ERI)	Istanbul Büyükșehir Belediye Spor Türkiye	3
8	Paul Wright (NZL)	Rembe Pro Cycling Team Sauerland	3
9	Michał Pomorski (POL)	Mazowsze Serce Polski	3
10	Jonathan Malte Rottmann (GER)	Rembe Pro Cycling Team Sauerland	3

=== Team classification ===
Final team classification (1–10)
Rank	Team	Time
1	(Switzerland) Q36.5 Pro Cycling Team	77h 41' 49"
2	(Malaysia) Terengganu Cycling Team	+ 9"
3	(Italy) VF Group–Bardiani–CSF–Faizanè	+ 26"
4	(Kazakhstan) Astana Qazaqstan Team	+ 29"
5	(Spain) Burgos BH	+ 33"
6	(Belgium) Bingoal WB	+ 3' 38"
7	(Germany) Bike Aid	+ 4' 25"
8	(Germany) Bora–Hansgrohe	+ 9' 54"
9	(Netherlands) TDT–Unibet Cycling Team	+ 10' 00"
10	(Spain) Caja Rural–Seguros RGA	+ 10' 11"
