= Jelte Krijnsen =

Dutch cyclist

Personal information
- Born: 12 May 2001 (age 25)
- Height: 1.84 m (6 ft 0 in)
- Weight: 73 kg (161 lb)

Cycling career
- Sport: Cycling
- Current team: Team Jayco–AlUla
- Discipline: Road
- Role: Rider

Amateur teams
- 2019: Willebrord Wil Vooruit Juniors
- 2020: WP Groot Amsterdam
- 2021: Amsterdam Racing Academy
- 2021: Holdsworth Zappi
- 2022: WP Groot Amsterdam
- 2023: Jegg-DJR Academy

Professional teams
- 2024: Parkhotel Valkenburg
- 2024: Q36.5 Pro Cycling Team (stagiaire)
- 2025–: Team Jayco–AlUla

Major wins
- Stage races Tour of Taihu Lake (2024)

Jelte Krijnsen (born 12 May 2001) is a Dutch professional road cyclist, who currently rides for UCI WorldTeam Team Jayco–AlUla. He took his first professional win in August 2024 on stage four of the Danmark Rundt. A week later, he won the Druivenkoers Overijse, his first race with Q36.5 Pro Cycling Team.

== Major results ==
2019
2nd Overall Tour de DMZ
3rd Guido Reybrouck Classic
8th Overall Ronde des Vallées
10th Nokere Koerse Juniores
2023
2nd Overall La SportBreizh
3rd Grand Prix des Marbriers
5th Grand Prix de Honelles
7th Overall Triptyque Ardennais
2024 (4 pro wins)
1st Overall Tour of Taihu Lake

1st Young rider classification
1st Stage 5

1st Druivenkoers Overijse
1st Stage 4 Danmark Rundt
2nd Elfstedenrace
3rd Overall Olympia's Tour
4th Fyen Rundt
4th Grand Prix Herning
6th Overall Tour du Loir-et-Cher

1st Stage 3

6th Overall Tour of Britain
7th Ronde van Overijssel
10th Muur Classic Geraardsbergen
