= 2024 Grand Prix de Wallonie =

2024 UCI ProSeries
- Event poster with previous winner Gonzalo Serrano

Race details
- Dates: 18 September 2024
- Stages: 1
- Distance: 202.39 km (125.8 mi)
- Winning time: 4h 41' 16"

Results
	Winner	Roger Adrià (ESP)	(Red Bull–Bora–Hansgrohe)
	Second	Alex Aranburu (ESP)	(Movistar Team)
	Third	Clément Champoussin (FRA)	(Arkéa–B&B Hotels)

The 2024 Grand Prix de Wallonie was the 64th edition of the Grand Prix de Wallonie road cycling one day race, which was held on 18 September 2024 as part of the 2024 UCI ProSeries calendar.

== Teams ==
Nine UCI WorldTeams, ten UCI ProTeams, and two UCI Continental teams made up the twenty-one teams that participated in the race.

UCI WorldTeams

- Alpecin–Deceuninck
- Arkéa–B&B Hotels
- Astana Qazaqstan Team
- Cofidis
- Decathlon–AG2R La Mondiale
- Intermarché–Wanty
- Movistar Team
- Red Bull–Bora–Hansgrohe
- UAE Team Emirates

UCI ProTeams

- Bingoal WB
- Caja Rural–Seguros RGA
- Team Flanders–Baloise
- Euskaltel–Euskadi
- Israel–Premier Tech
- Lotto–Dstny
- Q36.5 Pro Cycling Team
- Team TotalEnergies
- Tudor Pro Cycling Team
- Uno-X Mobility

UCI Continental Teams

- Van Rysel–Roubaix
- Philippe Wagner–Bazin

== Result ==
Result
Rank	Rider	Team	Time
1	Roger Adrià (ESP)	Red Bull–Bora–Hansgrohe	4h 41' 16"
2	Alex Aranburu (ESP)	Movistar Team	+ 0"
3	Clément Champoussin (FRA)	Arkéa–B&B Hotels	+ 0"
4	Biniam Girmay (ERI)	Intermarché–Wanty	+ 0"
5	Rick Pluimers (NED)	Tudor Pro Cycling Team	+ 0"
6	Tim Wellens (BEL)	UAE Team Emirates	+ 0"
7	Quinten Hermans (BEL)	Alpecin–Deceuninck	+ 0"
8	Joseph Blackmore (GBR)	Israel–Premier Tech	+ 0"
9	Axel Zingle (FRA)	Cofidis	+ 0"
10	Rui Oliveira (POR)	UAE Team Emirates	+ 0"
