= Matyáš Kopecký =

Czech professional road cyclist

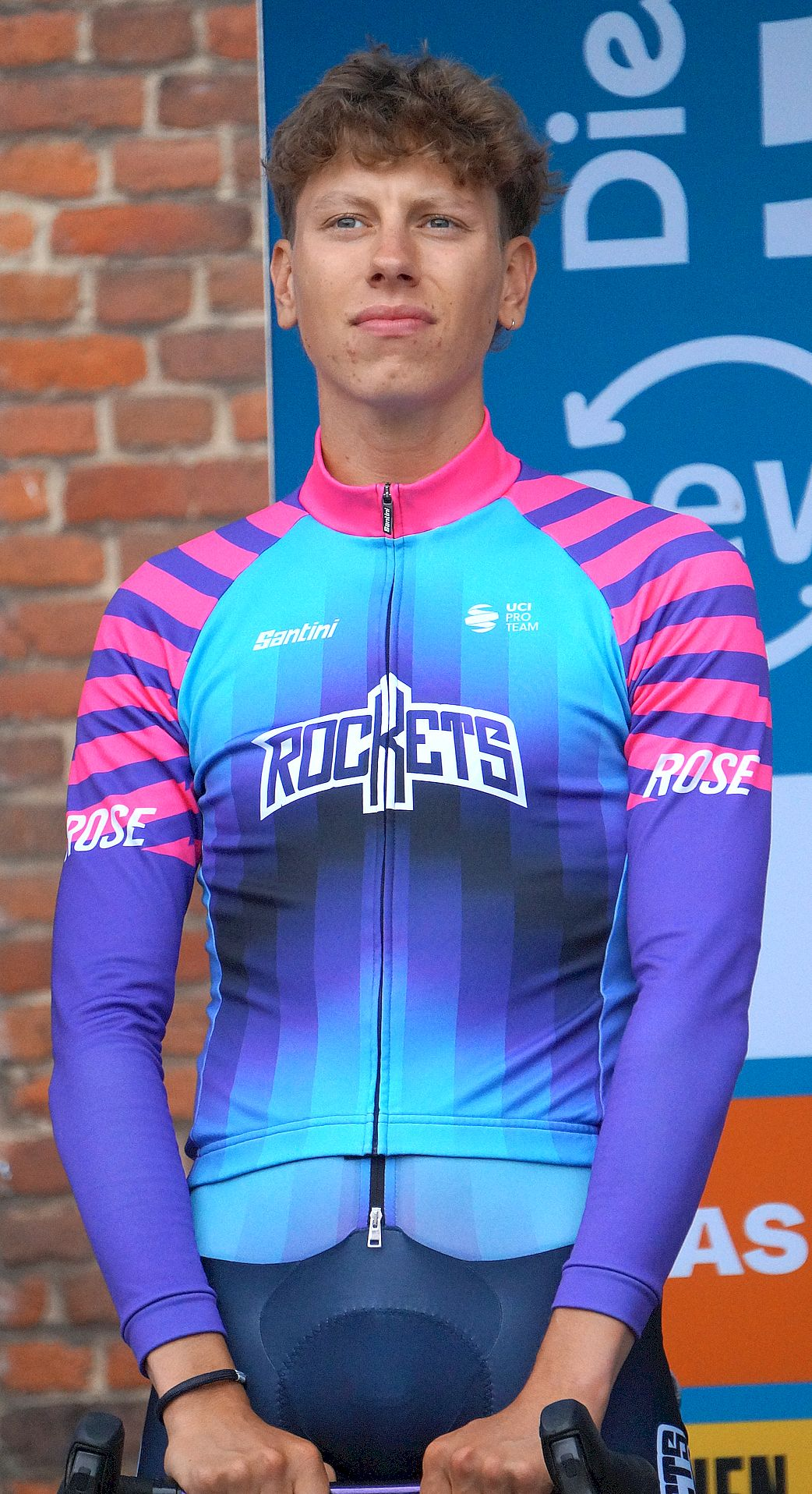
- Kopecký in 2026

Personal information
- Born: 19 January 2003 (age 23) Rotterdam, Netherlands

Cycling career
- Sport: Cycling
- Current team: Unibet Rose Rockets
- Disciplines: Road; Cyclo-cross
- Role: Rider
- Rider type: All-rounder

Amateur teams
- 2019: Acrog–Pauwels Sauzen–Balen BC Junior
- 2020: Callant–Pauwels Sauzen
- 2021: Acrog–Tormans Balen BC Junior

Professional teams
- 2022–2025: Team Novo Nordisk
- 2026: Unibet Rose Rockets

Matyáš Kopecký (born 19 January 2003) is a Czech professional road racing cyclist, who currently rides for the UCI ProTeam Unibet Rose Rockets. His older brother Tomáš and younger sister Julia are also professional cyclists.

== Major results ==
=== Road ===
2021
National Junior Championships

1st Road race
2nd Time trial

1st Overall Regionem Orlicka Lanškroun Juniors
2023
5th Road race, UEC European Under-23 Championships
10th Dwars door het Hageland
2024
5th Cholet-Pays de la Loire
8th Circuit Franco-Belge
9th La Roue Tourangelle
10th Road race, UEC European Under-23 Championships
10th Paris–Camembert
2025
1st Young rider classification, Région Pays de la Loire Tour
2nd Road race, National Championships
5th Route Adélie de Vitré
6th Overall Tour of Estonia

1st Young rider classification

7th Overall Région Pays de la Loire Tour

1st Young rider classification

7th Paris–Camembert
9th Overall Danmark Rundt
10th Maryland Cycling Classic
10th Münsterland Giro
2026
9th Overall Danmark Rundt
10th Overall Tour of Belgium

=== Cyclo-cross ===
2019–2020
1st Grand Prix Poprad Juniors
2nd Gran Premio Guerciotti Juniors
Junior DVV Trophy

3rd Brussels

2020–2021
Junior Toi Toi Cup

2nd Mladá Boleslav
3rd Holé Vrchy

2022–2023
2nd National Championships
