= Frank van den Broek =

Dutch cyclist

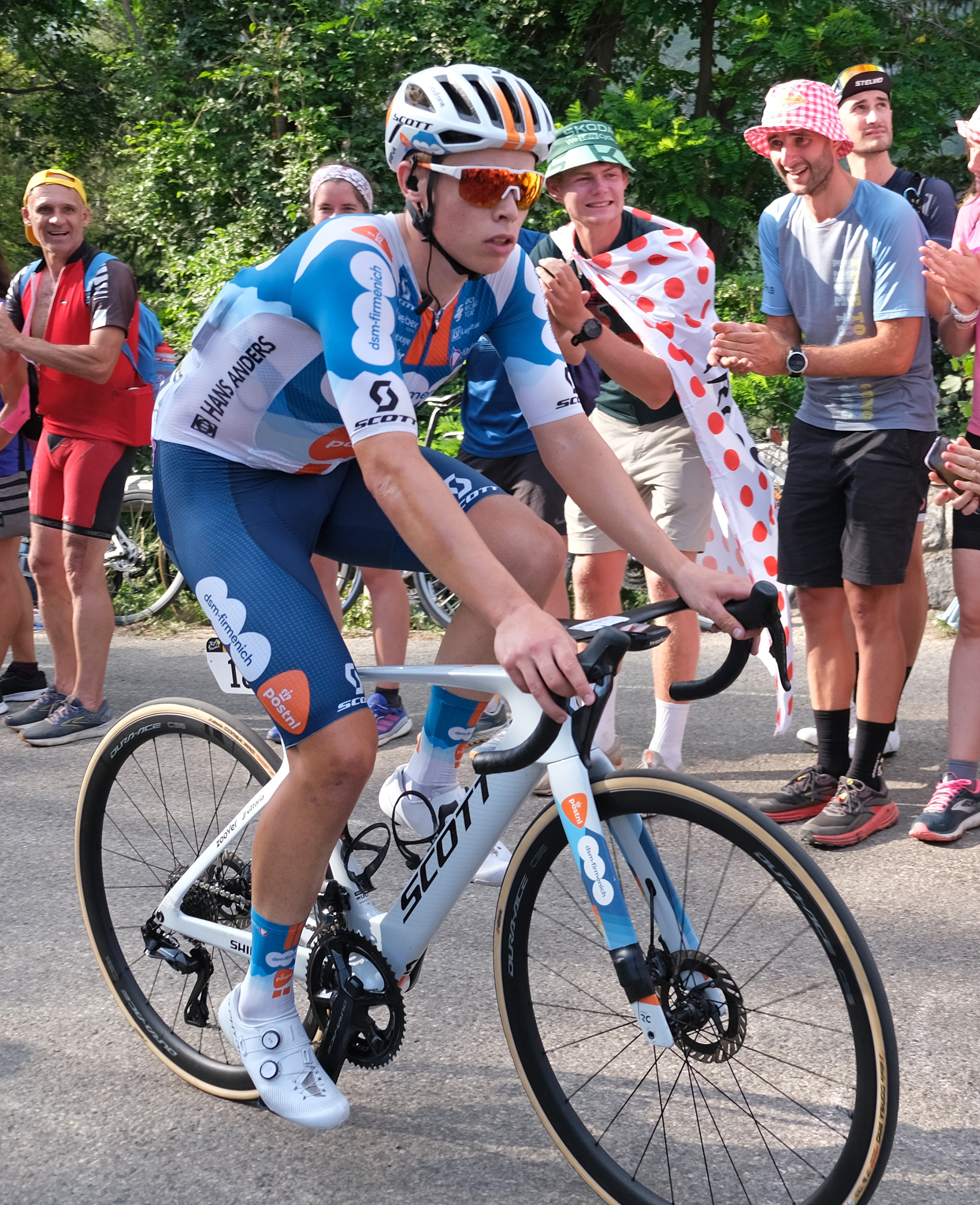
- van den Broek at the 2024 Tour de France

Personal information
- Born: 28 December 2000 (age 25) Warmond, Netherlands
- Height: 1.78 m (5 ft 10 in)
- Weight: 70 kg (154 lb)

Cycling career
- Sport: Cycling
- Current team: Team Picnic–PostNL
- Discipline: Road
- Role: Rider

Amateur teams
- 2019–2020: AW Groep–Swabo
- 2021: HSK Trias–Mooi Jong
- 2022: Jegg–DJR Academy

Professional teams
- 2023: ABLOC CT
- 2023: Development Team DSM–Firmenich
- 2024–: Team dsm–firmenich PostNL

Major wins
- Stage races Tour of Turkey (2024)

Frank van den Broek (born 28 December 2000) is a Dutch cyclist, who currently rides for UCI WorldTeam Team Picnic–PostNL.

After winning the national level Tour de Namur in 2022, van den Broek joined UCI Continental team ABLOC CT in 2023. In mid July, he moved to Development Team DSM–Firmenich, shortly after taking a stage win at the Tour of Qinghai Lake, his first pro-level victory. In 2024, van den Broek was promoted to the World Tour level with Team dsm–firmenich PostNL. In April, he won stage six of the Tour of Turkey, going on to win the overall title of the race as well. In July, he competed in his first Grand Tour: the Tour de France, where he finished second to team leader Romain Bardet on the first stage, holding off the chasing peloton by five seconds. He subsequently took the lead in both the young rider and points classifications, and was given the combativity award for the day.

== Major results ==
2022
1st Overall Tour de Namur
1st Ronde Van Midden-Brabant
1st Mountains classification, Carpathian Couriers Race
2023 (1 pro win)
1st Overall Ronde de l'Oise

1st Stage 4

1st Stage 4 Tour of Qinghai Lake
3rd Overall Tour Alsace

1st Stage 5

9th Overall Flèche du Sud
2024 (2)
1st Overall Tour of Turkey

1st Stage 6

7th Overall Danmark Rundt

1st Stage 1 (TTT)

9th Volta NXT Classic
Tour de France

Held & after Stage 1
Combativity award Stage 1

2025
2nd Volta NXT Classic
7th Overall Tour of Turkey
7th Overall AlUla Tour

=== Grand Tour general classification results timeline ===
Grand Tour	2024
Giro d'Italia	—
Tour de France	62
Vuelta a España	—

Legend
—	Did not compete
DNF	Did not finish
