= 2022 Tour of Belgium =

2022 UCI ProSeries
- Circuit of the 2022 Tour of Belgium

Race details
- Dates: 15–19 June 2021
- Stages: 5
- Distance: 717.9 km (446.1 mi)
- Winning time: 15h 58' 40"

Results
Jersey awarded to the overall winner	Winner	Mauro Schmid (SUI)	(Quick-Step Alpha Vinyl Team)
	Second	Tim Wellens (BEL)	(Lotto–Soudal)
	Third	Quinten Hermans (BEL)	(Intermarché–Wanty–Gobert Matériaux)
Jersey awarded to the points classification winner	Points	Mads Pedersen (DEN)	(Trek–Segafredo)
Jersey awarded to the combativity classification winner	Combativity	Dries De Bondt (BEL)	(Alpecin–Fenix)
	Team	Intermarché–Wanty–Gobert Matériaux	

The 2022 Tour of Belgium (known as the 2022 Baloise Belgium Tour for sponsorship purposes) was the 91st edition of the Tour of Belgium road cycling stage race, which took place from 15 to 19 June 2022. The category 2.Pro event formed a part of the 2022 UCI ProSeries.

== Teams ==
Eight of the nineteen UCI WorldTeams, six UCI ProTeams, and eight UCI Continental teams made up the twenty-two teams that participated in the race.

UCI WorldTeams

- Bora–Hansgrohe
- Cofidis
- Intermarché–Wanty–Gobert Matériaux
- Israel–Premier Tech
- Lotto–Soudal
- Quick-Step Alpha Vinyl Team
- Team DSM
- Trek–Segafredo

UCI ProTeams

- Alpecin–Fenix
- Arkéa–Samsic
- B&B Hotels–KTM
- Bingoal Pauwels Sauces WB
- Sport Vlaanderen–Baloise
- Uno-X Pro Cycling Team

UCI Continental Teams

- Baloise–Trek Lions
- Bolton Equities Black Spoke Pro Cycling
- BEAT Cycling
- Geofco–Doltcini Matériel-vélo.com
- Minerva Cycling Team
- Pauwels Sauzen–Bingoal
- Tarteletto–Isorex
- VolkerWessels Cycling Team

== Route ==
Stage characteristics and winners
Stage	Date	Course	Distance	Type	Stage winner
1	15 June	Merelbeke to Maarkedal	165.0 km (102.5 mi)	Flat stage	Mads Pedersen (DEN)
2	16 June	Beveren to Knokke-Heist	175.6 km (109.1 mi)	Flat stage	Jasper Philipsen (BEL)
3	17 June	Scherpenheuvel-Zichem to Scherpenheuvel-Zichem	11.8 km (7.3 mi)	Individual time trial	Yves Lampaert (BEL)
4	18 June	Durbuy to Durbuy	172.3 km (107.1 mi)	Hilly stage	Quinten Hermans (BEL)
5	19 June	Gingelom to Beringen	182.1 km (113.2 mi)	Flat stage	Fabio Jakobsen (NED)
Total			707.7 km (439.7 mi)		

== Stages ==
=== Stage 1 ===
15 June 2022 — Merelbeke to Maarkedal, 165.0 km (102.5 mi)

Stage 1 Result
Rank	Rider	Team	Time
1	Mads Pedersen (DEN)	Trek–Segafredo	3h 49' 35"
2	Tim Wellens (BEL)	Lotto–Soudal	+ 0"
3	Jasper Philipsen (BEL)	Alpecin–Fenix	+ 0"
4	Quinten Hermans (BEL)	Intermarché–Wanty–Gobert Matériaux	+ 0"
5	Robbe Ghys (BEL)	Sport Vlaanderen–Baloise	+ 0"
6	Lorenzo Rota (ITA)	Intermarché–Wanty–Gobert Matériaux	+ 0"
7	Florian Sénéchal (FRA)	Quick-Step Alpha Vinyl Team	+ 0"
8	Axel Zingle (FRA)	Cofidis	+ 0"
9	Julian Mertens (BEL)	Sport Vlaanderen–Baloise	+ 0"
10	Alberto Dainese (ITA)	Team DSM	+ 0"

General classification after Stage 1
Rank	Rider	Team	Time
1	Mads Pedersen (DEN)	Trek–Segafredo	3h 49' 19"
2	Tim Wellens (BEL)	Lotto–Soudal	+ 8"
3	Mauro Schmid (SUI)	Quick-Step Alpha Vinyl Team	+ 10"
4	Jasper Philipsen (BEL)	Alpecin–Fenix	+ 12"
5	Yves Lampaert (BEL)	Quick-Step Alpha Vinyl Team	+ 13"
6	Quinten Hermans (BEL)	Intermarché–Wanty–Gobert Matériaux	+ 16"
7	Robbe Ghys (BEL)	Sport Vlaanderen–Baloise	+ 16"
8	Lorenzo Rota (ITA)	Intermarché–Wanty–Gobert Matériaux	+ 16"
9	Florian Sénéchal (FRA)	Quick-Step Alpha Vinyl Team	+ 16"
10	Axel Zingle (FRA)	Cofidis	+ 16"

=== Stage 2 ===
16 June 2022 — Beveren to Knokke-Heist, 175.6 km (109.1 mi)

Stage 2 Result
Rank	Rider	Team	Time
1	Jasper Philipsen (BEL)	Alpecin–Fenix	3h 48' 12"
2	Danny van Poppel (NED)	Bora–Hansgrohe	+ 0"
3	Mads Pedersen (DEN)	Trek–Segafredo	+ 0"
4	Arnaud De Lie (BEL)	Lotto–Soudal	+ 0"
5	Sasha Weemaes (BEL)	Sport Vlaanderen–Baloise	+ 0"
6	Alberto Dainese (ITA)	Team DSM	+ 0"
7	Fabio Jakobsen (NED)	Quick-Step Alpha Vinyl Team	+ 0"
8	Hugo Hofstetter (FRA)	Arkéa–Samsic	+ 0"
9	Stanisław Aniołkowski (POL)	Bingoal Pauwels Sauces WB	+ 0"
10	Gerben Thijssen (BEL)	Intermarché–Wanty–Gobert Matériaux	+ 0"

General classification after Stage 2
Rank	Rider	Team	Time
1	Mads Pedersen (DEN)	Trek–Segafredo	7h 37' 57"
2	Jasper Philipsen (BEL)	Alpecin–Fenix	+ 6"
3	Tim Wellens (BEL)	Lotto–Soudal	+ 12"
4	Danny van Poppel (NED)	Bora–Hansgrohe	+ 14"
5	Mauro Schmid (SUI)	Quick-Step Alpha Vinyl Team	+ 14"
6	Quinten Hermans (BEL)	Intermarché–Wanty–Gobert Matériaux	+ 17"
7	Yves Lampaert (BEL)	Quick-Step Alpha Vinyl Team	+ 17"
8	Florian Sénéchal (FRA)	Quick-Step Alpha Vinyl Team	+ 17"
9	Loïc Vliegen (BEL)	Intermarché–Wanty–Gobert Matériaux	+ 18"
10	Axel Zingle (FRA)	Cofidis	+ 19"

=== Stage 3 ===
17 June 2022 — Scherpenheuvel-Zichem to Scherpenheuvel-Zichem, 11.8 km (7.3 mi)

Stage 3 Result
Rank	Rider	Team	Time
1	Yves Lampaert (BEL)	Quick-Step Alpha Vinyl Team	13' 39"
2	Mads Pedersen (DEN)	Trek–Segafredo	+ 7"
3	Daan Hoole (NED)	Trek–Segafredo	+ 10"
4	Oscar Riesebeek (NED)	Alpecin–Fenix	+ 12"
5	Lasse Norman Hansen (DEN)	Uno-X Pro Cycling Team	+ 14"
6	Florian Vermeersch (BEL)	Lotto–Soudal	+ 14"
7	Aaron Gate (NZL)	Bolton Equities Black Spoke Pro Cycling	+ 16"
8	Alex Kirsch (LUX)	Trek–Segafredo	+ 16"
9	Jordi Meeus (BEL)	Bora–Hansgrohe	+ 17"
10	Tim Wellens (BEL)	Lotto–Soudal	+ 19"

General classification after Stage 3
Rank	Rider	Team	Time
1	Mads Pedersen (DEN)	Trek–Segafredo	7h 51' 43"
2	Yves Lampaert (BEL)	Quick-Step Alpha Vinyl Team	+ 10"
3	Tim Wellens (BEL)	Lotto–Soudal	+ 24"
4	Oscar Riesebeek (NED)	Alpecin–Fenix	+ 25"
5	Jasper Philipsen (BEL)	Alpecin–Fenix	+ 28"
6	Mauro Schmid (SUI)	Quick-Step Alpha Vinyl Team	+ 28"
7	Axel Zingle (FRA)	Cofidis	+ 38"
8	Florian Sénéchal (FRA)	Quick-Step Alpha Vinyl Team	+ 43"
9	Quinten Hermans (BEL)	Intermarché–Wanty–Gobert Matériaux	+ 46"
10	Danny van Poppel (NED)	Bora–Hansgrohe	+ 48"

=== Stage 4 ===
18 June 2022 — Durbuy to Durbuy, 172.3 km (107.1 mi)

Stage 4 Result
Rank	Rider	Team	Time
1	Quinten Hermans (BEL)	Intermarché–Wanty–Gobert Matériaux	4h 19' 39"
2	Mauro Schmid (SUI)	Quick-Step Alpha Vinyl Team	+ 0"
3	Tim Wellens (BEL)	Lotto–Soudal	+ 4"
4	Lorenzo Rota (ITA)	Intermarché–Wanty–Gobert Matériaux	+ 6"
5	Dries De Bondt (BEL)	Alpecin–Fenix	+ 29"
6	Victor Campenaerts (BEL)	Lotto–Soudal	+ 29"
7	Mark Donovan (GBR)	Team DSM	+ 2' 20"
8	Yves Lampaert (BEL)	Quick-Step Alpha Vinyl Team	+ 2' 22"
9	Mads Pedersen (DEN)	Trek–Segafredo	+ 2' 27"
10	Jasper Philipsen (BEL)	Alpecin–Fenix	+ 2' 27"

General classification after Stage 4
Rank	Rider	Team	Time
1	Mauro Schmid (SUI)	Quick-Step Alpha Vinyl Team	12h 11' 41"
2	Tim Wellens (BEL)	Lotto–Soudal	+ 0"
3	Quinten Hermans (BEL)	Intermarché–Wanty–Gobert Matériaux	+ 8"
4	Lorenzo Rota (ITA)	Intermarché–Wanty–Gobert Matériaux	+ 41"
5	Victor Campenaerts (BEL)	Lotto–Soudal	+ 1' 05"
6	Dries De Bondt (BEL)	Alpecin–Fenix	+ 1' 50"
7	Mads Pedersen (DEN)	Trek–Segafredo	+ 2' 08"
8	Yves Lampaert (BEL)	Quick-Step Alpha Vinyl Team	+ 2' 13"
9	Oscar Riesebeek (NED)	Alpecin–Fenix	+ 2' 33"
10	Jasper Philipsen (BEL)	Alpecin–Fenix	+ 2' 36"

=== Stage 5 ===
19 June 2022 — Gingelom to Beringen, 182.1 km (113.2 mi)

Stage 5 Result
Rank	Rider	Team	Time
1	Fabio Jakobsen (NED)	Quick-Step Alpha Vinyl Team	3h 47' 03"
2	Jasper Philipsen (BEL)	Alpecin–Fenix	+ 0"
3	Gerben Thijssen (BEL)	Intermarché–Wanty–Gobert Matériaux	+ 0"
4	Sam Bennett (IRL)	Bora–Hansgrohe	+ 0"
5	Max Walscheid (GER)	Cofidis	+ 0"
6	Amaury Capiot (BEL)	Arkéa–Samsic	+ 0"
7	Mads Pedersen (DEN)	Trek–Segafredo	+ 0"
8	Alberto Dainese (ITA)	Team DSM	+ 0"
9	Sasha Weemaes (BEL)	Sport Vlaanderen–Baloise	+ 0"
10	Tom van Asbroeck (BEL)	Israel–Premier Tech	+ 0"

General classification after Stage 5
Rank	Rider	Team	Time
1	Mauro Schmid (SUI)	Quick-Step Alpha Vinyl Team	15h 58' 40"
2	Tim Wellens (BEL)	Lotto–Soudal	+ 0"
3	Quinten Hermans (BEL)	Intermarché–Wanty–Gobert Matériaux	+ 12"
4	Lorenzo Rota (ITA)	Intermarché–Wanty–Gobert Matériaux	+ 45"
5	Victor Campenaerts (BEL)	Lotto–Soudal	+ 1' 09"
6	Dries De Bondt (BEL)	Alpecin–Fenix	+ 1' 54"
7	Mads Pedersen (DEN)	Trek–Segafredo	+ 2' 12"
8	Jasper Philipsen (BEL)	Alpecin–Fenix	+ 2' 34"
9	Oscar Riesebeek (NED)	Alpecin–Fenix	+ 2' 37"
10	Aaron Gate (NZL)	Bolton Equities Black Spoke Pro Cycling	+ 3' 03"

== Classification leadership table ==
Classification leadership by stage
Stage	Winner	General classification (Dutch: Algemeenklassement)	Points classification (Dutch: Puntenklassement)	Combativity classification (Dutch: Strijdlustklassement)	Young rider classification (Dutch: Jongerenklassement)	Team classification (Dutch: Ploegenklassement)
1	Mads Pedersen	Mads Pedersen	Mads Pedersen	Mark Donovan	Thibau Nys	Intermarché–Wanty–Gobert Matériaux
2	Jasper Philipsen	Mads Pedersen	Mads Pedersen	Daan van Sintmaartensdijk	Thibau Nys	Intermarché–Wanty–Gobert Matériaux
3	Yves Lampaert	Mads Pedersen	Mads Pedersen	Daan van Sintmaartensdijk	Kévin Vauquelin	Quick-Step Alpha Vinyl Team
4	Quinten Hermans	Mauro Schmid	Mads Pedersen	Dries De Bondt	Kévin Vauquelin	Intermarché–Wanty–Gobert Matériaux
5	Fabio Jakobsen	Mauro Schmid	Mads Pedersen	Dries De Bondt	Kévin Vauquelin	Intermarché–Wanty–Gobert Matériaux
Final		Mauro Schmid	Mads Pedersen	Dries De Bondt	Kévin Vauquelin	Intermarché–Wanty–Gobert Matériaux

- On stage 2, Tim Wellens, who was second in the points classification, wore the red jersey, because first placed Mads Pedersen wore the blue jersey as the leader of the general classification.
- On stages 3 and 4, Jasper Philipsen, who was second in the points classification, wore the red jersey, because first placed Mads Pedersen wore the blue jersey as the leader of the general classification.

== Classification standings ==
Legend
Denotes the leader of the general classification	Denotes the leader of the combativity classification
Denotes the leader of the points classification	Denotes the leader of the young rider classification

=== General classification ===
Final general classification
Rank	Rider	Team	Time
1	Mauro Schmid (SUI)	Quick-Step Alpha Vinyl Team	15h 58' 40"
2	Tim Wellens (BEL)	Lotto–Soudal	+ 0"
3	Quinten Hermans (BEL)	Intermarché–Wanty–Gobert Matériaux	+ 12"
4	Lorenzo Rota (ITA)	Intermarché–Wanty–Gobert Matériaux	+ 45"
5	Victor Campenaerts (BEL)	Lotto–Soudal	+ 1' 09"
6	Dries De Bondt (BEL)	Alpecin–Fenix	+ 1' 54"
7	Mads Pedersen (DEN)	Trek–Segafredo	+ 2' 12"
8	Jasper Philipsen (BEL)	Alpecin–Fenix	+ 2' 34"
9	Oscar Riesebeek (NED)	Alpecin–Fenix	+ 2' 37"
10	Aaron Gate (NZL)	Bolton Equities Black Spoke Pro Cycling	+ 3' 03"

=== Points classification ===
Final points classification
Rank	Rider	Team	Points
1	Mads Pedersen (DEN)	Trek–Segafredo	94
2	Jasper Philipsen (BEL)	Alpecin–Fenix	87
3	Tim Wellens (BEL)	Lotto–Soudal	53
4	Quinten Hermans (BEL)	Intermarché–Wanty–Gobert Matériaux	49
5	Fabio Jakobsen (NED)	Quick-Step Alpha Vinyl Team	43
6	Alberto Dainese (ITA)	Team DSM	37
7	Lorenzo Rota (ITA)	Intermarché–Wanty–Gobert Matériaux	34
8	Gerben Thijssen (BEL)	Intermarché–Wanty–Gobert Matériaux	32
9	Sasha Weemaes (BEL)	Sport Vlaanderen–Baloise	28
10	Mauro Schmid (SUI)	Quick-Step Alpha Vinyl Team	25

=== Combativity classification ===
Final combativity classification
Rank	Rider	Team	Points
1	Dries De Bondt (BEL)	Alpecin–Fenix	57
2	Daan van Sintmaartensdijk (NED)	VolkerWessels Cycling Team	51
3	Yoeri Havik (NED)	BEAT Cycling	33
4	Marco Tizza (ITA)	Bingoal Pauwels Sauces WB	20
5	Yentl Vandevelde (BEL)	Minerva Cycling Team	17
6	Tom Van Asbroeck (BEL)	Israel–Premier Tech	16
7	Martin Urianstad (NOR)	Uno-X Pro Cycling Team	14
8	Quinten Hermans (BEL)	Intermarché–Wanty–Gobert Matériaux	13
9	Quentin Jaurégui (FRA)	B&B Hotels–KTM	12
10	Mark Donovan (GBR)	Team DSM	11

=== Young rider classification ===
Final young rider classification
Rank	Rider	Team	Time
1	Kévin Vauquelin (FRA)	Arkéa–Samsic	16h 01' 57"
2	William Blume Levy (DEN)	Uno-X Pro Cycling Team	+ 9' 42"
3	Thibau Nys (BEL)	Baloise–Trek Lions	+ 10' 22"
4	Jenno Berckmoes (BEL)	Sport Vlaanderen–Baloise	+ 10' 29"
5	Luis-Joe Lührs (GER)	Bora–Hansgrohe	+ 10' 57"
6	Logan Currie (NZL)	Bolton Equities Black Spoke Pro Cycling	+ 11' 21"
7	Axel Laurence (FRA)	B&B Hotels–KTM	+ 12' 58"
8	Yentl Vandevelde (BEL)	Minerva Cycling Team	+ 22' 23"
9	Arnaud De Lie (BEL)	Lotto–Soudal	+ 27' 11"
10	Witse Meeussen (BEL)	Pauwels Sauzen–Bingoal	+ 27' 18"

=== Team classification ===
Final team classification
Rank	Team	Time
1	Intermarché–Wanty–Gobert Matériaux	48h 00' 54"
2	Quick-Step Alpha Vinyl Team	+ 1' 59"
3	Alpecin–Fenix	+ 2' 33"
4	Lotto–Soudal	+ 7' 06"
5	Israel–Premier Tech	+ 12' 30"
6	Sport Vlaanderen–Baloise	+ 12' 40"
7	Uno-X Pro Cycling Team	+ 17' 51"
8	Bolton Equities Black Spoke Pro Cycling	+ 20' 15"
9	Arkéa–Samsic	+ 28' 37"
10	Team DSM	+ 34' 54"
