= 2023 ZLM Tour =

2023 UCI ProSeries

Race details
- Dates: 7–11 June
- Stages: 4 + Prologue
- Distance: 746.3 km (463.7 mi)
- Winning time: 16h 18' 37"

Results
Jersey awarded to the overall winner	Winner	Olav Kooij (NED)	(Team Jumbo–Visma)
	Second	Sam Welsford (AUS)	(Team DSM)
	Third	Nils Eekhoff (NED)	(Team DSM)
Jersey awarded to the points classification winner	Points	Olav Kooij (NED)	(Team Jumbo–Visma)
Jersey awarded to the youth classification winner	Youth	Olav Kooij (NED)	(Team Jumbo–Visma)
	Team	(Netherlands) Team DSM	

The 2023 ZLM Tour was the 34th edition of the ZLM Tour cycling stage race. It started on 7 June in Heinkenszand and ended on 11 June in Oosterhout and is part of the 2023 UCI ProSeries.

== Teams ==
Four UCI WorldTeams, eight UCI ProTeams and eight UCI Continental teams twenty teams that participated in the race.

UCI WorldTeams

- Alpecin–Deceuninck
- Astana Qazaqstan Team
- Team DSM
- Team Jumbo–Visma

UCI ProTeams

- Bingoal WB
- Burgos BH
- Eolo–Kometa
- Green Project–Bardiani–CSF–Faizanè
- Q36.5 Pro Cycling Team
- Team Corratec–Selle Italia
- Team Flanders–Baloise
- Tudor Pro Cycling Team

UCI Continental Teams

- ABLOC CT
- Allinq Continental Cycling Team
- BEAT Cycling Club
- Bike Aid
- Leopard TOGT Pro Cycling
- Metec–Solarwatt p/b Mantel
- TDT–Unibet Cycling Team
- VolkerWessels Cycling Team

== Route ==
Stage characteristics and winners
Stage	Date	Course	Distance	Type	Stage winner
P	7 June	Heinkenszand	6.6 km (4.1 mi)	Individual time trial	Nils Eekhoff (NED)
1	8 June	Westkapelle to 's-Heerenhoek	203.1 km (126.2 mi)	Flat stage	Yentl Vandevelde (BEL)
2	9 June	Schijndel to Buchten	184 km (114.3 mi)	Flat stage	Jakub Mareczko (ITA)
3	10 June	Roosendaal to Roosendaal	194.1 km (120.6 mi)	Flat stage	Arvid de Kleijn (NED)
4	11 June	Oosterhout to Oosterhout	158.5 km (98.5 mi)	Flat stage	Olav Kooij (NED)
Total		746.3 km (463.7 mi)			

== Stages ==
=== Prologue ===
7 June 2023 – Heinkenszand, 6.6 km (4.1 mi) (ITT)

Prologue Result
Rank	Rider	Team	Time
1	Nils Eekhoff (NED)	Team DSM	7' 27"
2	Alex Edmondson (AUS)	Team DSM	+ 1"
3	Olav Kooij (NED)	Team Jumbo–Visma	+ 1"
4	Maikel Zijlaard (NED)	Tudor Pro Cycling Team	+ 3"
5	Sam Welsford (AUS)	Team DSM	+ 4"
6	Cees Bol (NED)	Astana Qazaqstan Team	+ 6"
7	Tim van Dijke (NED)	Team Jumbo–Visma	+ 8"
8	Jos van Emden (NED)	Team Jumbo–Visma	+ 9"
9	Patrick Eddy (AUS)	Team DSM	+ 9"
10	Noah Vandenbranden (BEL)	Team Flanders–Baloise	+ 11"

General classification after Stage 1
Rank	Rider	Team	Time
1	Nils Eekhoff (NED)	Team DSM	7' 27"
2	Alex Edmondson (AUS)	Team DSM	+ 1"
3	Olav Kooij (NED)	Team Jumbo–Visma	+ 1"
4	Maikel Zijlaard (NED)	Tudor Pro Cycling Team	+ 3"
5	Sam Welsford (AUS)	Team DSM	+ 4"
6	Cees Bol (NED)	Astana Qazaqstan Team	+ 6"
7	Tim van Dijke (NED)	Team Jumbo–Visma	+ 8"
8	Jos van Emden (NED)	Team Jumbo–Visma	+ 9"
9	Patrick Eddy (AUS)	Team DSM	+ 9"
10	Noah Vandenbranden (BEL)	Team Flanders–Baloise	+ 11"

=== Stage 1 ===
8 June 2023 – Westkapelle to 's-Heerenhoek, 203.1 km (126.2 mi)

Stage 1 Result
Rank	Rider	Team	Time
1	Yentl Vandevelde (BEL)	TDT–Unibet Cycling Team	4h 21' 52"
2	Alexander Konychev (ITA)	Team Corratec–Selle Italia	+ 0"
3	Bert-Jan Lindeman (NED)	VolkerWessels Cycling Team	+ 0"
4	Emiel Vermeulen (BEL)	BEAT Cycling Club	+ 0"
5	Martijn Rasenberg (NED)	ABLOC CT	+ 0"
6	Sam Welsford (AUS)	Team DSM	+ 0"
7	Arvid de Kleijn (NED)	Tudor Pro Cycling Team	+ 0"
8	Matteo Malucelli (ITA)	Bingoal WB	+ 0"
9	Olav Kooij (NED)	Team Jumbo–Visma	+ 0"
10	Manuel Peñalver (ESP)	Burgos BH	+ 0"

General classification after Stage 1
Rank	Rider	Team	Time
1	Nils Eekhoff (NED)	Team DSM	4h 29' 25"
2	Alex Edmondson (AUS)	Team DSM	+ 1"
3	Olav Kooij (NED)	Team Jumbo–Visma	+ 1"
4	Sam Welsford (AUS)	Team DSM	+ 4"
5	Cees Bol (NED)	Astana Qazaqstan Team	+ 6"
6	Tim van Dijke (NED)	Team Jumbo–Visma	+ 15"
7	Joren Bloem (NED)	TDT–Unibet Cycling Team	+ 20"
8	Robbe Ghys (BEL)	Alpecin–Deceuninck	+ 22"
9	Hartthijs de Vries (NED)	TDT–Unibet Cycling Team	+ 22"
10	Mark Cavendish (GBR)	Astana Qazaqstan Team	+ 23"

=== Stage 2 ===
9 June 2023 – Schijndel to Buchten, 184 km (114.3 mi)

Stage 2 Result
Rank	Rider	Team	Time
1	Jakub Mareczko (ITA)	Alpecin–Deceuninck	4h 05' 46"
2	Olav Kooij (NED)	Team Jumbo–Visma	+ 0"
3	Robbe Ghys (BEL)	Alpecin–Deceuninck	+ 0"
4	Matteo Malucelli (ITA)	Bingoal WB	+ 0"
5	Arvid de Kleijn (NED)	Tudor Pro Cycling Team	+ 0"
6	Jules Hesters (BEL)	Team Flanders–Baloise	+ 0"
7	Manuel Peñalver (ESP)	Burgos BH	+ 0"
8	Matteo Moschetti (ITA)	Q36.5 Pro Cycling Team	+ 0"
9	Jesper Rasch (NED)	ABLOC CT	+ 0"
10	Filippo Fiorelli (ITA)	Green Project–Bardiani–CSF–Faizanè	+ 0"

General classification after Stage 2
Rank	Rider	Team	Time
1	Olav Kooij (NED)	Team Jumbo–Visma	8h 35' 06"
2	Nils Eekhoff (NED)	Team DSM	+ 5"
3	Alex Edmondson (AUS)	Team DSM	+ 6"
4	Sam Welsford (AUS)	Team DSM	+ 9"
5	Cees Bol (NED)	Astana Qazaqstan Team	+ 11"
6	Tim van Dijke (NED)	Team Jumbo–Visma	+ 20"
7	Hartthijs de Vries (NED)	TDT–Unibet Cycling Team	+ 21"
8	Robbe Ghys (BEL)	Alpecin–Deceuninck	+ 23"
9	Joren Bloem (NED)	TDT–Unibet Cycling Team	+ 25"
10	Mark Cavendish (GBR)	Astana Qazaqstan Team	+ 28"

=== Stage 3 ===
10 June 2023 – Roosendaal to Roosendaal, 194.1 km (120.6 mi)

Stage 3 Result
Rank	Rider	Team	Time
1	Arvid de Kleijn (NED)	Tudor Pro Cycling Team	4h 16' 35"
2	Jakub Mareczko (ITA)	Alpecin–Deceuninck	+ 0"
3	Matteo Moschetti (ITA)	Q36.5 Pro Cycling Team	+ 0"
4	Matteo Malucelli (ITA)	Bingoal WB	+ 0"
5	Jules Hesters (BEL)	Team Flanders–Baloise	+ 0"
6	Enrico Zanoncello (ITA)	Green Project–Bardiani–CSF–Faizanè	+ 0"
7	Giovanni Lonardi (ITA)	Eolo–Kometa	+ 0"
8	Filippo Fiorelli (ITA)	Green Project–Bardiani–CSF–Faizanè	+ 0"
9	Alex Edmondson (AUS)	Team DSM	+ 0"
10	Mārtiņš Pluto (LAT)	ABLOC CT	+ 0"

General classification after Stage 3
Rank	Rider	Team	Time
1	Olav Kooij (NED)	Team Jumbo–Visma	12h 51' 41"
2	Nils Eekhoff (NED)	Team DSM	+ 5"
3	Alex Edmondson (AUS)	Team DSM	+ 6"
4	Sam Welsford (AUS)	Team DSM	+ 9"
5	Cees Bol (NED)	Astana Qazaqstan Team	+ 11"
6	Tim van Dijke (NED)	Team Jumbo–Visma	+ 20"
7	Hartthijs de Vries (NED)	TDT–Unibet Cycling Team	+ 21"
8	Robbe Ghys (BEL)	Alpecin–Deceuninck	+ 23"
9	Joren Bloem (NED)	TDT–Unibet Cycling Team	+ 25"
10	Mark Cavendish (GBR)	Astana Qazaqstan Team	+ 28"

=== Stage 4 ===
11 June 2023 – Oosterhout to Oosterhout, 158.5 km (98.5 mi)

Stage 4 Result
Rank	Rider	Team	Time
1	Olav Kooij (NED)	Team Jumbo–Visma	3h 27' 06"
2	Sam Welsford (AUS)	Team DSM	+ 0"
3	Jakub Mareczko (ITA)	Alpecin–Deceuninck	+ 0"
4	Arvid de Kleijn (NED)	Tudor Pro Cycling Team	+ 0"
5	Yoeri Havik (NED)	BEAT Cycling Club	+ 0"
6	Matteo Malucelli (ITA)	Bingoal WB	+ 0"
7	Jules Hesters (BEL)	Team Flanders–Baloise	+ 0"
8	Giovanni Lonardi (ITA)	Eolo–Kometa	+ 0"
9	Manuel Peñalver (ESP)	Burgos BH	+ 0"
10	Filippo Fiorelli (ITA)	Green Project–Bardiani–CSF–Faizanè	+ 0"

General classification after Stage 4
Rank	Rider	Team	Time
1	Olav Kooij (NED)	Team Jumbo–Visma	16h 18' 37"
2	Sam Welsford (AUS)	Team DSM	+ 13"
3	Nils Eekhoff (NED)	Team DSM	+ 15"
4	Alex Edmondson (AUS)	Team DSM	+ 16"
5	Cees Bol (NED)	Astana Qazaqstan Team	+ 21"
6	Tim van Dijke (NED)	Team Jumbo–Visma	+ 30"
7	Robbe Ghys (BEL)	Alpecin–Deceuninck	+ 33"
8	Joren Bloem (NED)	TDT–Unibet Cycling Team	+ 35"
9	Mark Cavendish (GBR)	Astana Qazaqstan Team	+ 38"
10	Hartthijs de Vries (NED)	TDT–Unibet Cycling Team	+ 41"

== Classification leadership table ==
Stage	Winner	General classification	Points classification	Young rider classification	Teams classification
P	Nils Eekhoff	Nils Eekhoff	Nils Eekhoff	Olav Kooij	Team DSM
1	Yentl Vandevelde	Nils Eekhoff	Nils Eekhoff	Olav Kooij	Team DSM
2	Jakub Mareczko	Olav Kooij	Olav Kooij	Olav Kooij	Team DSM
3	Arvid de Kleijn	Olav Kooij	Jakub Mareczko	Olav Kooij	Team DSM
4	Olav Kooij	Olav Kooij	Olav Kooij	Olav Kooij	Team DSM
Final		Olav Kooij	Olav Kooij	Olav Kooij	Team DSM

== Classification standings ==
Legend
Denotes the winner of the general classification
Denotes the winner of the points classification
Denotes the winner of the young rider classification

=== General classification ===
Final general classification (1–10)
Rank	Rider	Team	Time
1	Olav Kooij (NED)	Team Jumbo–Visma	16h 18' 37"
2	Sam Welsford (AUS)	Team DSM	+ 13"
3	Nils Eekhoff (NED)	Team DSM	+ 15"
4	Alex Edmondson (AUS)	Team DSM	+ 16"
5	Cees Bol (NED)	Astana Qazaqstan Team	+ 21"
6	Tim van Dijke (NED)	Team Jumbo–Visma	+ 30"
7	Robbe Ghys (BEL)	Alpecin–Deceuninck	+ 33"
8	Joren Bloem (NED)	TDT–Unibet Cycling Team	+ 35"
9	Mark Cavendish (GBR)	Astana Qazaqstan Team	+ 38"
10	Hartthijs de Vries (NED)	TDT–Unibet Cycling Team	+ 41"

=== Points classification ===
Final points classification (1–10)
Rank	Rider	Team	Points
1	Olav Kooij (NED)	Team Jumbo–Visma	39
2	Jakub Mareczko (ITA)	Alpecin–Deceuninck	37
3	Arvid de Kleijn (NED)	Tudor Pro Cycling Team	33
4	Matteo Malucelli (ITA)	Bingoal WB	24
5	Sam Welsford (AUS)	Team DSM	23
6	Jules Hesters (BEL)	Team Flanders–Baloise	15
7	Nils Eekhoff (NED)	Team DSM	15
8	Yentl Vandevelde (BEL)	TDT–Unibet Cycling Team	15
9	Alex Edmondson (AUS)	Team DSM	14
10	Matteo Moschetti (ITA)	Q36.5 Pro Cycling Team	13

=== Young rider classification ===
Final young rider classification (1–10)
Rank	Rider	Team	Time
1	Olav Kooij (NED)	Team Jumbo–Visma	16h 18' 37"
2	Tobias Lund Andresen (DEN)	Team DSM	+ 1' 11"
3	Tobias Aagaard Hansen (DEN)	Leopard TOGT Pro Cycling	+ 1' 48"
4	Lars Hohmann (NED)	Metec–Solarwatt p/b Mantel	+ 1' 53"
5	Milan Fretin (BEL)	Team Flanders–Baloise	+ 2' 55"
6	Iker Bonillo (ESP)	Green Project–Bardiani–CSF–Faizanè	+ 7' 47"
7	Javier Serrano (ESP)	Eolo–Kometa	+ 8' 42"
8	Mike Bronswijk (NED)	Allinq Continental Cycling Team	+ 10' 14"
9	Noah Vandenbranden (BEL)	Team Flanders–Baloise	+ 10' 56"
10	Thibaut Bernard (BEL)	Bingoal WB	+ 11' 02"

=== Team classification ===
Final team classification (1–10)
Rank	Team	Time
1	(Netherlands) Team DSM	48h 56' 41"
2	(Netherlands) TDT–Unibet Cycling Team	+ 1' 21"
3	(Belgium) Alpecin–Deceuninck	+ 1' 26"
4	(Switzerland) Tudor Pro Cycling Team	+ 1' 27"
5	(Netherlands) Team Jumbo–Visma	+ 1' 35"
6	(Belgium) Team Flanders–Baloise	+ 2' 16"
7	(Netherlands) BEAT Cycling Club	+ 2' 19"
8	(Italy) Eolo–Kometa	+ 2' 42"
9	(Belgium) Bingoal WB	+ 2' 46"
10	(Switzerland) Q36.5 Pro Cycling Team	+ 2' 53"
