= 2025 Nokere Koerse =

2025 UCI ProSeries
- Official event poster

Race details
- Dates: 19 March 2025
- Stages: 1
- Distance: 188.1 km (116.9 mi)
- Winning time: 4h 17' 33"

Results
	Winner	Nils Eekhoff (NED)	(Team Picnic PostNL)
	Second	Matteo Moschetti (ITA)	(Q36.5 Pro Cycling Team)
	Third	Luke Lamperti (USA)	(Soudal–Quick-Step)

The 2025 Danilith Nokere Koerse was the 79th edition of the Nokere Koerse one-day road cycling race. It was held on 19 March 2025 as a category 1.Pro race on the 2025 UCI ProSeries calendar.

== Teams ==
Ten of the 18 UCI WorldTeams, nine UCI ProTeams, and one UCI Continental team made up the 20 teams that participated in the race.

UCI WorldTeams

- Alpecin–Deceuninck
- Cofidis
- Groupama–FDJ
- Intermarché–Wanty
- Lidl–Trek
- Soudal–Quick-Step
- Team Bahrain Victorious
- Team Picnic PostNL
- UAE Team Emirates XRG
- XDS Astana Team

UCI ProTeams

- Euskaltel–Euskadi
- Israel–Premier Tech
- Lotto
- Q36.5 Pro Cycling Team
- Team Flanders–Baloise
- Tudor Pro Cycling Team
- Unibet Tietema Rockets
- Uno-X Mobility
- Wagner Bazin WB

UCI Continental Teams

- Tarteletto–Isorex

== Result ==
Result (1–10)
Rank	Rider	Team	Time
1	Nils Eekhoff (NED)	Team Picnic PostNL	4h 17' 33"
2	Matteo Moschetti (ITA)	Q36.5 Pro Cycling Team	+ 0"
3	Luke Lamperti (USA)	Soudal–Quick-Step	+ 0"
4	Milan Fretin (BEL)	Cofidis	+ 0"
5	Milan Menten (BEL)	Lotto	+ 0"
6	Piet Allegaert (BEL)	Cofidis	+ 0"
7	Lewis Askey (GBR)	Groupama–FDJ	+ 0"
8	Alberto Dainese (ITA)	Tudor Pro Cycling Team	+ 0"
9	Lukáš Kubiš (SVK)	Unibet Tietema Rockets	+ 0"
10	Hugo Hofstetter (FRA)	Israel–Premier Tech	+ 0"
