= Diego Rubio (cyclist) =

Spanish cyclist (born 1991)

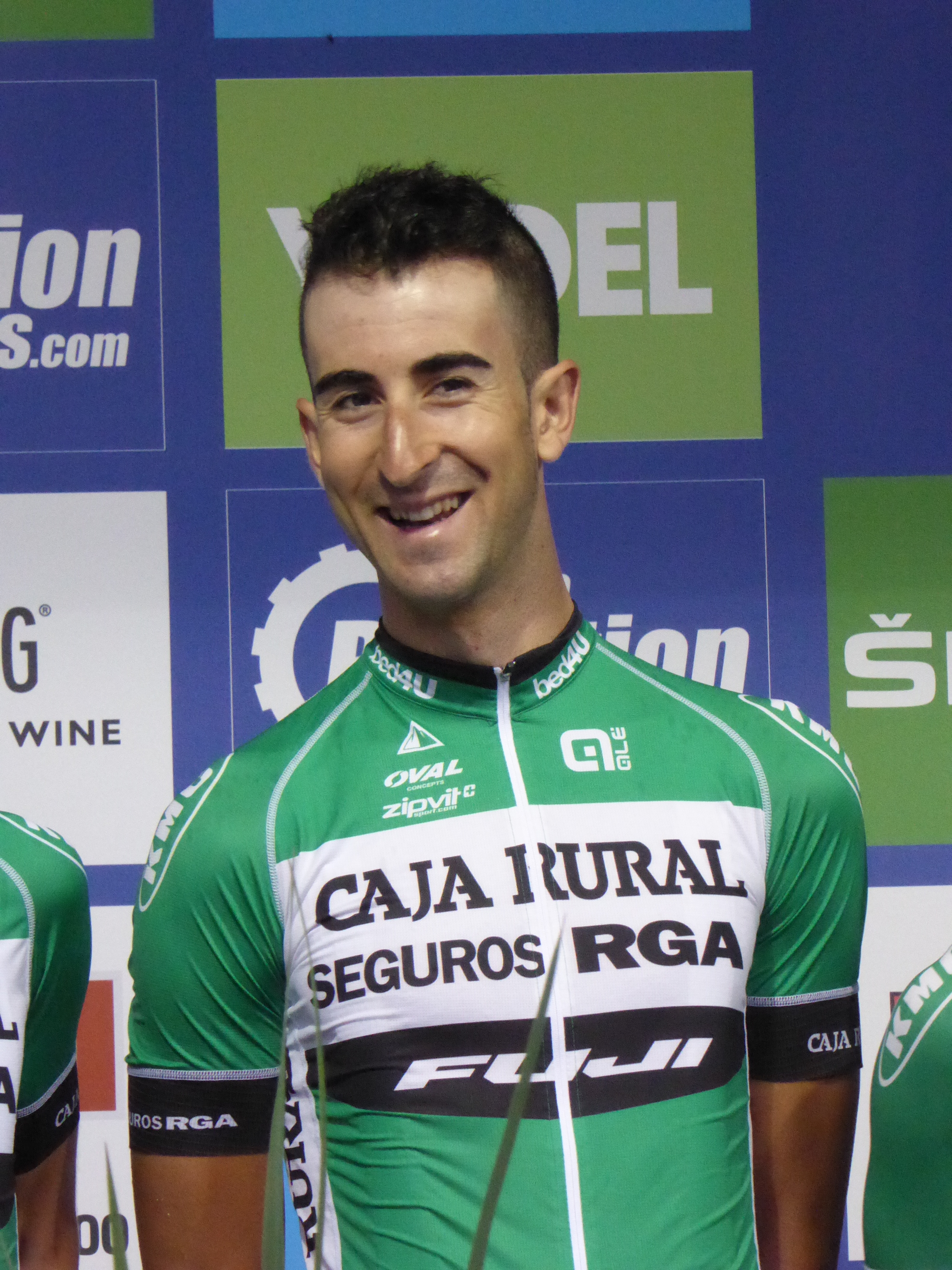
- Rubio at the 2016 Tour of Britain.

Personal information
- Full name: Diego Rubio Hernández
- Born: 13 June 1991 (age 35) Navaluenga, Spain
- Height: 1.93 m (6 ft 4 in)
- Weight: 81 kg (179 lb)

Cycling career
- Sport: Cycling
- Current team: Burgos Burpellet BH
- Discipline: Road
- Role: Rider

Amateur teams
- 2010–2012: Diputación de Ávila–Toshiba
- 2013: Caja Rural amateur

Professional teams
- 2013: Caja Rural–Seguros RGA (stagiaire)
- 2014–2015: Efapel–Glassdrive
- 2016–2017: Caja Rural–Seguros RGA
- 2018–: Burgos BH

Diego Rubio Hernández (born 13 June 1991) is a Spanish cyclist, who currently rides for UCI ProTeam Burgos Burpellet BH. He was named in the startlist for the 2017 Vuelta a España.

== Major results ==
2012
4th Overall Tour d'Azerbaïdjan

1st Stage 2

2015
2nd Overall Vuelta a la Comunidad de Madrid
2016
6th Overall Tour du Limousin

1st Young rider classification

2017
4th Vuelta a La Rioja
Combativity award Stage 4 Vuelta a España
2018
5th Overall Vuelta a Castilla y León
7th Prueba Villafranca de Ordizia
2019
1st Mountains classification Volta a la Comunitat Valenciana
4th Road race, National Road Championships
7th Overall Vuelta a Aragón
Combativity award Stage 14 Vuelta a España
2020
2nd Trofeo Matteotti
2021
5th Overall Boucles de la Mayenne
Combativity award Stage 2 Vuelta a España

=== Grand Tour general classification results timeline ===
| Grand Tour | 2017 | 2018 | 2019 | 2020 | 2021 |
|---|---|---|---|---|---|
| Giro d'Italia | — | — | — | — | — |
| Tour de France | — | — | — | — | — |
| Vuelta a España | 127 | 138 | 146 | — | DNF |

Legend
| — | Did not compete |
| DNF | Did not finish |
