= 2021 Boucles de la Mayenne =

2021 UCI Europe Tour 2021 UCI ProSeries

Race details
- Dates: 27–30 May 2021
- Stages: 4
- Distance: 711 km (441.8 mi)

Results
Jersey awarded to the overall winner	Winner	Arnaud Démare (FRA)	(Groupama–FDJ)
	Second	Philipp Walsleben (GER)	(Alpecin–Fenix)
	Third	Kristoffer Halvorsen (NOR)	(Uno-X Pro Cycling Team)
Jersey awarded to the points classification winner	Points	Arnaud Démare (FRA)	(Groupama–FDJ)
Jersey awarded to the mountains classification winner	Mountains	Jhonatan Restrepo (COL)	(Androni Giocattoli–Sidermec)
Jersey awarded to the youth classification winner	Youth	Nils Eekhoff (NED)	(Team DSM)
	Team	Delko	

The 2021 Boucles de la Mayenne (transl. Loops of the Mayenne) was the 46th edition of the Boucles de la Mayenne road cycling stage race, which took place between 27 and 30 May 2021 in the Mayenne department in northwestern France.

The race had been promoted from category-2.1 race to a category-2.Pro race after the 2019 season and was due to be a part of the inaugural edition of the UCI ProSeries, but after the 2020 edition was cancelled due to the COVID-19 pandemic, it made its UCI ProSeries debut in 2021, while also still being a part of the 2021 UCI Europe Tour.

== Teams ==
Five of the nineteen UCI WorldTeams, fourteen UCI ProTeams, and two UCI Continental teams made up the twenty-one teams that participated in the race. Team DSM and Rally Cycling, with five riders each, were the only teams not to enter a full squad of six riders. However, two late scratches, one each from Cofidis and Team DSM, left 122 riders on the start line. 111 riders finished the race.

UCI WorldTeams

- AG2R Citroën Team
- Cofidis
- Groupama–FDJ
- Intermarché–Wanty–Gobert Matériaux
- Team DSM

UCI ProTeams

- Alpecin–Fenix
- Androni Giocattoli–Sidermec
- Arkéa–Samsic
- B&B Hotels p/b KTM
- Bingoal Pauwels Sauces WB
- Burgos BH
- Caja Rural–Seguros RGA
- Delko
- Equipo Kern Pharma
- Gazprom–RusVelo
- Rally Cycling
- Sport Vlaanderen–Baloise
- Total Direct Énergie
- Uno-X Pro Cycling Team

UCI Continental Teams

- St. Michel–Auber93
- Xelliss–Roubaix–Lille Métropole

== Route ==
Stage characteristics and winners
Stage	Date	Course	Distance	Type	Stage winner
1	27 May	Le Genest-Saint-Isle to Ambrières-les-Vallées	175 km (109 mi)	Hilly stage	Philipp Walsleben (GER)
2	28 May	Vaiges to Évron	173 km (107 mi)	Hilly stage	Arnaud Démare (FRA)
3	29 May	Saint-Berthevin to Craon	182 km (113 mi)	Hilly stage	Arnaud Démare (FRA)
4	30 May	Méral to Laval	181 km (112 mi)	Hilly stage	Arnaud Démare (FRA)
Total			711 km (442 mi)		

== Stages ==
=== Stage 1 ===
27 May 2021 – Le Genest-Saint-Isle to Ambrières-les-Vallées, 175 km (109 mi)

Stage 1 Result
Rank	Rider	Team	Time
1	Philipp Walsleben (GER)	Alpecin–Fenix	3h 59' 48"
2	Diego Rubio (ESP)	Burgos BH	+ 7"
3	Arnaud Démare (FRA)	Groupama–FDJ	+ 11"
4	Kristoffer Halvorsen (NOR)	Uno-X Pro Cycling Team	+ 11"
5	Bryan Coquard (FRA)	B&B Hotels p/b KTM	+ 11"
6	Piet Allegaert (BEL)	Cofidis	+ 11"
7	Marc Sarreau (FRA)	AG2R Citroën Team	+ 11"
8	Nils Eekhoff (NED)	Team DSM	+ 11"
9	Bram Welten (NED)	Arkéa–Samsic	+ 15"
10	Jon Aberasturi (ESP)	Caja Rural–Seguros RGA	+ 17"

General classification after Stage 1
Rank	Rider	Team	Time
1	Philipp Walsleben (GER)	Alpecin–Fenix	3h 59' 33"
2	Diego Rubio (ESP)	Burgos BH	+ 16"
3	Arnaud Démare (FRA)	Groupama–FDJ	+ 22"
4	Kristoffer Halvorsen (NOR)	Uno-X Pro Cycling Team	+ 26"
5	Bryan Coquard (FRA)	B&B Hotels p/b KTM	+ 26"
6	Piet Allegaert (BEL)	Cofidis	+ 26"
7	Marc Sarreau (FRA)	AG2R Citroën Team	+ 26"
8	Nils Eekhoff (NED)	Team DSM	+ 26"
9	Bram Welten (NED)	Arkéa–Samsic	+ 30"
10	Jon Aberasturi (ESP)	Caja Rural–Seguros RGA	+ 32"

=== Stage 2 ===
28 May 2021 – Vaiges to Évron, 173 km (107 mi)

Stage 2 Result
Rank	Rider	Team	Time
1	Arnaud Démare (FRA)	Groupama–FDJ	4h 11' 32"
2	Niccolò Bonifazio (ITA)	Total Direct Énergie	+ 0"
3	Kristoffer Halvorsen (NOR)	Uno-X Pro Cycling Team	+ 0"
4	Jonas Koch (GER)	Intermarché–Wanty–Gobert Matériaux	+ 0"
5	Stanisław Aniołkowski (POL)	Bingoal Pauwels Sauces WB	+ 0"
6	Piet Allegaert (BEL)	Cofidis	+ 0"
7	Matteo Malucelli (ITA)	Androni Giocattoli–Sidermec	+ 0"
8	Emiel Vermeulen (BEL)	Xelliss–Roubaix–Lille Métropole	+ 0"
9	Jon Aberasturi (ESP)	Caja Rural–Seguros RGA	+ 0"
10	Nils Eekhoff (NED)	Team DSM	+ 0"

General classification after Stage 2
Rank	Rider	Team	Time
1	Philipp Walsleben (GER)	Alpecin–Fenix	8h 11' 05"
2	Arnaud Démare (FRA)	Groupama–FDJ	+ 12"
3	Diego Rubio (ESP)	Burgos BH	+ 16"
4	Kristoffer Halvorsen (NOR)	Uno-X Pro Cycling Team	+ 22"
5	Piet Allegaert (BEL)	Cofidis	+ 26"
6	Nils Eekhoff (NED)	Team DSM	+ 26"
7	Niccolò Bonifazio (ITA)	Total Direct Énergie	+ 26"
8	Marc Sarreau (FRA)	AG2R Citroën Team	+ 26"
9	Bryan Coquard (FRA)	B&B Hotels p/b KTM	+ 26"
10	Benoît Cosnefroy (FRA)	AG2R Citroën Team	+ 29"

=== Stage 3 ===
29 May 2021 – Saint-Berthevin to Craon, 182 km (113 mi)

Stage 3 Result
Rank	Rider	Team	Time
1	Arnaud Démare (FRA)	Groupama–FDJ	4h 18' 48"
2	Kristoffer Halvorsen (NOR)	Uno-X Pro Cycling Team	+ 0"
3	Nils Eekhoff (NED)	Team DSM	+ 0"
4	Arvid de Kleijn (NED)	Rally Cycling	+ 0"
5	Stanisław Aniołkowski (POL)	Bingoal Pauwels Sauces WB	+ 0"
6	Piet Allegaert (BEL)	Cofidis	+ 0"
7	Daniel McLay (GBR)	Arkéa–Samsic	+ 0"
8	Emiel Vermeulen (BEL)	Xelliss–Roubaix–Lille Métropole	+ 0"
9	Sasha Weemaes (BEL)	Sport Vlaanderen–Baloise	+ 0"
10	Jon Aberasturi (ESP)	Caja Rural–Seguros RGA	+ 0"

General classification after Stage 3
Rank	Rider	Team	Time
1	Arnaud Démare (FRA)	Groupama–FDJ	12h 29' 55"
2	Philipp Walsleben (GER)	Alpecin–Fenix	+ 2"
3	Kristoffer Halvorsen (NOR)	Uno-X Pro Cycling Team	+ 14"
4	Bryan Coquard (FRA)	B&B Hotels p/b KTM	+ 18"
5	Diego Rubio (ESP)	Burgos BH	+ 18"
6	Nils Eekhoff (NED)	Team DSM	+ 20"
7	Piet Allegaert (BEL)	Cofidis	+ 24"
8	Niccolò Bonifazio (ITA)	Total Direct Énergie	+ 24"
9	Tobias Bayer (AUT)	Alpecin–Fenix	+ 26"
10	Marc Sarreau (FRA)	AG2R Citroën Team	+ 28"

=== Stage 4 ===
30 May 2021 – Méral to Laval, 181 km (112 mi)

Stage 4 Result
Rank	Rider	Team	Time
1	Arnaud Démare (FRA)	Groupama–FDJ	4h 14' 55"
2	Daniel McLay (GBR)	Arkéa–Samsic	+ 0"
3	Bryan Coquard (FRA)	B&B Hotels p/b KTM	+ 0"
4	Nils Eekhoff (NED)	Team DSM	+ 0"
5	Stanisław Aniołkowski (POL)	Bingoal Pauwels Sauces WB	+ 0"
6	Niccolò Bonifazio (ITA)	Total Direct Énergie	+ 0"
7	Kristoffer Halvorsen (NOR)	Uno-X Pro Cycling Team	+ 0"
8	Jon Aberasturi (ESP)	Caja Rural–Seguros RGA	+ 0"
9	Marc Sarreau (FRA)	AG2R Citroën Team	+ 0"
10	Jordi Warlop (BEL)	Sport Vlaanderen–Baloise	+ 0"

General classification after Stage 4
Rank	Rider	Team	Time
1	Arnaud Démare (FRA)	Groupama–FDJ	16h 44' 40"
2	Philipp Walsleben (GER)	Alpecin–Fenix	+ 17"
3	Kristoffer Halvorsen (NOR)	Uno-X Pro Cycling Team	+ 24"
4	Bryan Coquard (FRA)	B&B Hotels p/b KTM	+ 24"
5	Diego Rubio (ESP)	Burgos BH	+ 28"
6	Nils Eekhoff (NED)	Team DSM	+ 30"
7	Niccolò Bonifazio (ITA)	Total Direct Énergie	+ 34"
8	Daniel McLay (GBR)	Arkéa–Samsic	+ 34"
9	Tobias Bayer (AUT)	Alpecin–Fenix	+ 36"
10	Marc Sarreau (FRA)	AG2R Citroën Team	+ 38"

== Classification leadership table ==
Classification leadership by stage
Stage	Winner	General classification	Points classification	Mountains classification	Young rider classification	Team classification	Combativity award
1	Philipp Walsleben	Philipp Walsleben	Philipp Walsleben	Maxime Urruty	Nils Eekhoff	Alpecin–Fenix	Diego Rubio
2	Arnaud Démare	Philipp Walsleben	Arnaud Démare	Maxime Urruty	Nils Eekhoff	Alpecin–Fenix	Benoît Cosnefroy
3	Arnaud Démare	Arnaud Démare	Arnaud Démare	Maxime Urruty	Nils Eekhoff	Alpecin–Fenix	Ludovic Robeet
4	Arnaud Démare	Arnaud Démare	Arnaud Démare	Jhonatan Restrepo	Nils Eekhoff	Delko	Roger Adrià
Final		Arnaud Démare	Arnaud Démare	Jhonatan Restrepo	Nils Eekhoff	Delko	Not awarded

- On stage 2, Diego Rubio, who was second in the points classification, wore the green jersey, because first placed Philipp Walsleben wore the yellow jersey as the leader of the general classification.
- On stage 4, Kristoffer Halvorsen, who was second in the points classification, wore the green jersey, because first placed Arnaud Démare wore the yellow jersey as the leader of the general classification.

== Final classification standings ==
Legend
Denotes the winner of the general classification	Denotes the winner of the mountains classification
Denotes the winner of the points classification	Denotes the winner of the young rider classification

=== General classification ===
Final general classification (1–10)
Rank	Rider	Team	Time
1	Arnaud Démare (FRA)	Groupama–FDJ	16h 44' 40"
2	Philipp Walsleben (GER)	Alpecin–Fenix	+ 17"
3	Kristoffer Halvorsen (NOR)	Uno-X Pro Cycling Team	+ 24"
4	Bryan Coquard (FRA)	B&B Hotels p/b KTM	+ 24"
5	Diego Rubio (ESP)	Burgos BH	+ 28"
6	Nils Eekhoff (NED)	Team DSM	+ 30"
7	Niccolò Bonifazio (ITA)	Total Direct Énergie	+ 34"
8	Daniel McLay (GBR)	Arkéa–Samsic	+ 34"
9	Tobias Bayer (AUT)	Alpecin–Fenix	+ 36"
10	Marc Sarreau (FRA)	AG2R Citroën Team	+ 38"

=== Points classification ===
Final points classification (1–10)
Rank	Rider	Team	Points
1	Arnaud Démare (FRA)	Groupama–FDJ	92
2	Kristoffer Halvorsen (NOR)	Uno-X Pro Cycling Team	59
3	Bryan Coquard (FRA)	B&B Hotels p/b KTM	45
4	Nils Eekhoff (NED)	Team DSM	44
5	Stanisław Aniołkowski (POL)	Bingoal Pauwels Sauces WB	36
6	Philipp Walsleben (GER)	Alpecin–Fenix	35
7	Niccolò Bonifazio (ITA)	Total Direct Énergie	30
8	Piet Allegaert (BEL)	Cofidis	30
9	Daniel McLay (GBR)	Arkéa–Samsic	29
10	Jon Aberasturi (ESP)	Caja Rural–Seguros RGA	27

=== Mountains classification ===
Final mountains classification (1–10)
Rank	Rider	Team	Points
1	Jhonatan Restrepo (COL)	Androni Giocattoli–Sidermec	36
2	Roger Adrià (ESP)	Equipo Kern Pharma	34
3	Stan Dewulf (BEL)	AG2R Citroën Team	31
4	Maxime Urruty (FRA)	Xelliss–Roubaix–Lille Métropole	30
5	Tobias Bayer (AUT)	Alpecin–Fenix	30
6	Morné van Niekerk (RSA)	St. Michel–Auber93	22
7	Kiko Galván (ESP)	Equipo Kern Pharma	13
8	Alexandre Delettre (FRA)	Delko	12
9	Benoît Cosnefroy (FRA)	AG2R Citroën Team	12
10	Ludwig De Winter (BEL)	Intermarché–Wanty–Gobert Matériaux	12

=== Young rider classification ===
Final young rider classification (1–10)
Rank	Rider	Team	Time
1	Nils Eekhoff (NED)	Team DSM	16h 45' 10"
2	Tobias Bayer (AUT)	Alpecin–Fenix	+ 6"
3	Alexandre Delettre (FRA)	Delko	+ 8"
4	Stanisław Aniołkowski (POL)	Bingoal Pauwels Sauces WB	+ 10"
5	Pier-André Côté (CAN)	Rally Cycling	+ 19"
6	Jordí López (ESP)	Equipo Kern Pharma	+ 29"
7	Petr Rikunov (RUS)	Gazprom–RusVelo	+ 29"
8	Roger Adrià (ESP)	Equipo Kern Pharma	+ 1' 09"
9	Kiko Galván (ESP)	Equipo Kern Pharma	+ 1' 13"
10	Bram Welten (NED)	Arkéa–Samsic	+ 1' 14"

=== Team classification ===
Final team classification (1–10)
Rank	Team	Time
1	Delko	50h 16' 04"
2	Sport Vlaanderen–Baloise	+ 0"
3	Alpecin–Fenix	+ 2"
4	Xelliss–Roubaix–Lille Métropole	+ 15"
5	Burgos BH	+ 18"
6	Team DSM	+ 18"
7	Androni Giocattoli–Sidermec	+ 19"
8	AG2R Citroën Team	+ 22"
9	B&B Hotels p/b KTM	+ 28"
10	Caja Rural–Seguros RGA	+ 34"
