= Oscar Riesebeek =

Dutch cyclist (born 1992)

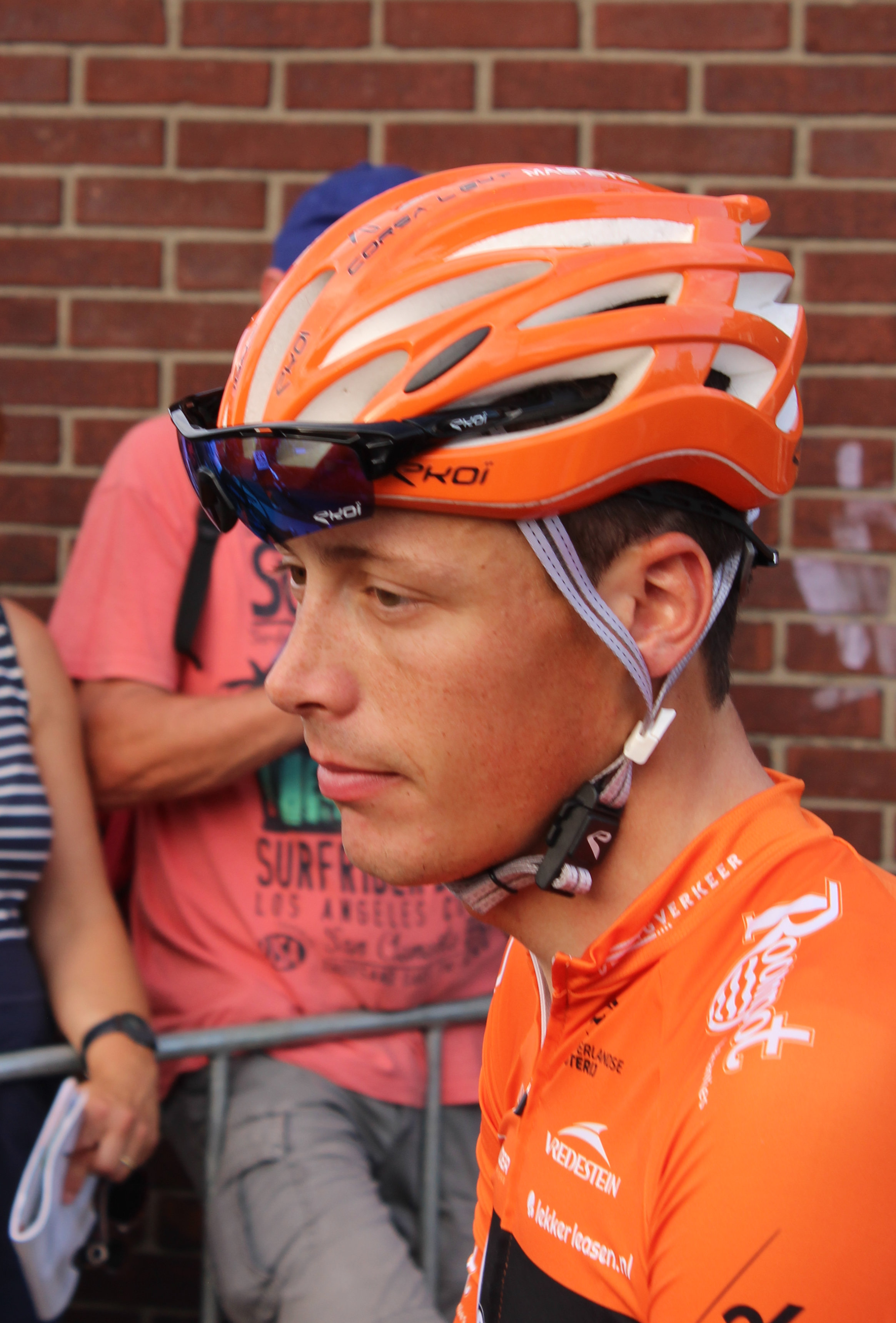

Personal information
- Full name: Oscar Riesebeek
- Born: 23 December 1992 (age 33) Ede, Netherlands
- Height: 1.91 m (6 ft 3 in)
- Weight: 75 kg (165 lb)

Cycling career
- Sport: Cycling
- Current team: Alpecin–Premier Tech
- Discipline: Road
- Role: Rider

Amateur teams
- 1999–2008: JvR de Batauwers
- 2009–2010: UWTC de Volharding

Professional teams
- 2011–2012: Rabobank Continental Team
- 2013–2016: Metec–TKH
- 2017–2019: Roompot–Nederlandse Loterij
- 2020–: Alpecin–Deceuninck

Oscar Riesebeek (born 23 December 1992 in Ede) is a Dutch cyclist, who currently rides for UCI WorldTeam Alpecin–Premier Tech.

== Major results ==
2009
1st Overall Grand Prix Rüebliland
2010
2nd Overall Munsterland Giro Juniors

1st Stage 1

2nd Overall Keizer der Juniores
2015
1st Mountains classification, Czech Cycling Tour
3rd Parel van de Veluwe
4th GP Viborg
8th Grote Prijs Jef Scherens
8th La Roue Tourangelle
2016
1st Omloop der Kempen
7th Sundvolden GP
10th Ringerike GP
2017
6th Omloop Mandel-Leie-Schelde
9th Overall Circuit de la Sarthe
2018
2nd Druivenkoers Overijse
3rd Overall Four Days of Dunkirk
7th Overall Circuit de la Sarthe
2019
3rd Overall Circuit de la Sarthe
4th Ronde van Overijssel
4th Memorial Rik Van Steenbergen
4th Circuit de Wallonie
4th Veenendaal–Veenendaal Classic
2020
1st Overall Tour Bitwa Warszawska 1920

1st Stage 4

2021
3rd Road race, National Road Championships
8th Overall Tour of Belgium
8th Heistse Pijl
9th Brabantse Pijl
2022
1st Dwars door het Hageland
9th Overall Tour of Belgium

=== Grand Tour general classification results timeline ===
Grand Tour	2021	2022	2023	2024	2025
Giro d'Italia	104	113	DNF	—	—
Tour de France	—	—	—	—	—
Vuelta a España	—	—	—	130	153

Legend
—	Did not compete
DNF	Did not finish
IP	In progress
