= Tim van Dijke =

Dutch racing cyclist

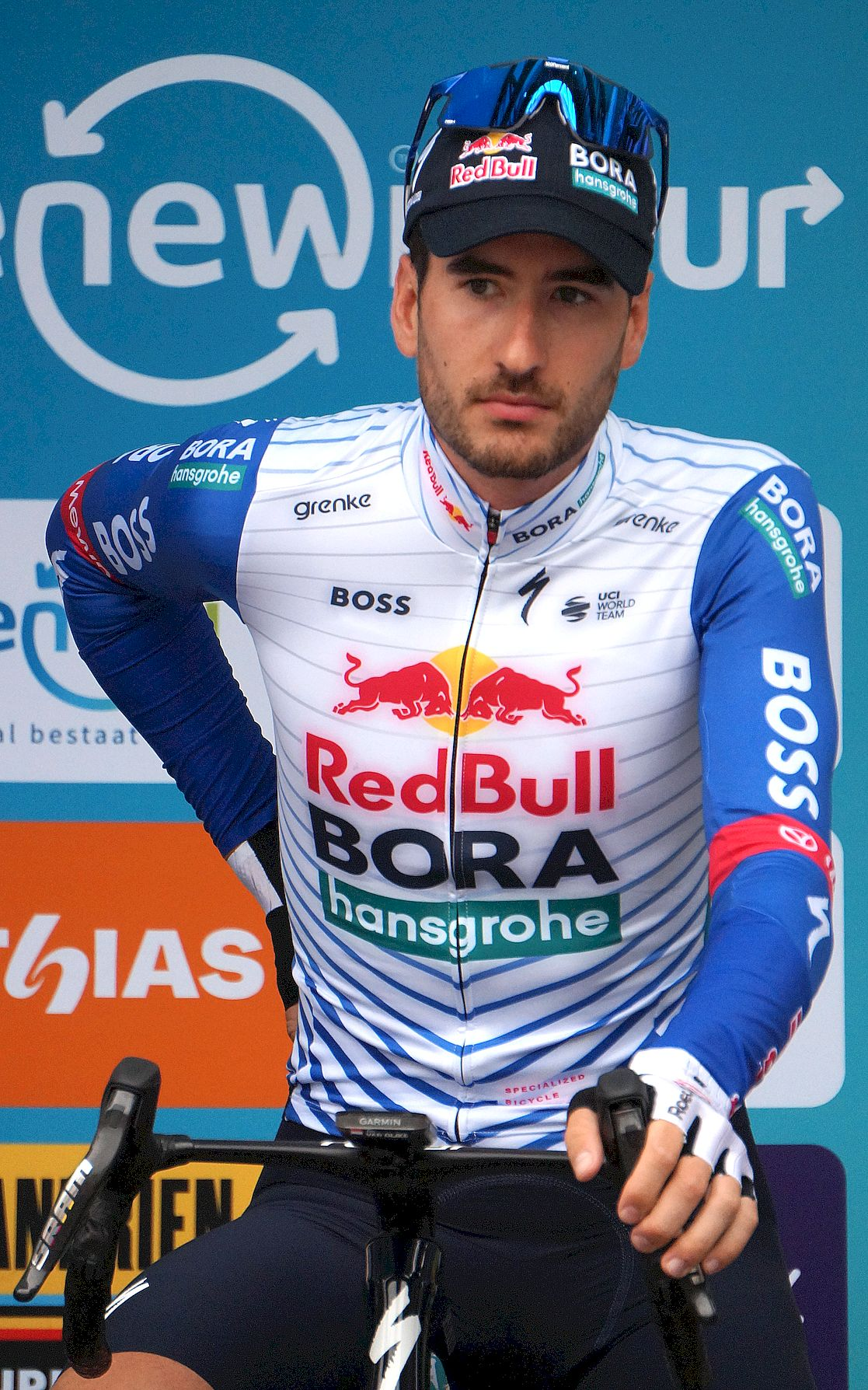
- Tim van Dijke in 2026

Personal information
- Full name: Tim van Dijke
- Born: 15 March 2000 (age 26) Goes, Netherlands
- Height: 1.89 m (6 ft 2 in)
- Weight: 74 kg (163 lb)

Cycling career
- Sport: Cycling
- Current team: Red Bull–Bora–Hansgrohe
- Disciplines: Road; Cyclo-cross
- Role: Rider

Amateur team
- 2019: ZRTC Theo Middelkamp

Professional teams
- 2020–2021: Jumbo–Visma Development Team
- 2022–2024: Team Jumbo–Visma
- 2025–: Red Bull–Bora–Hansgrohe

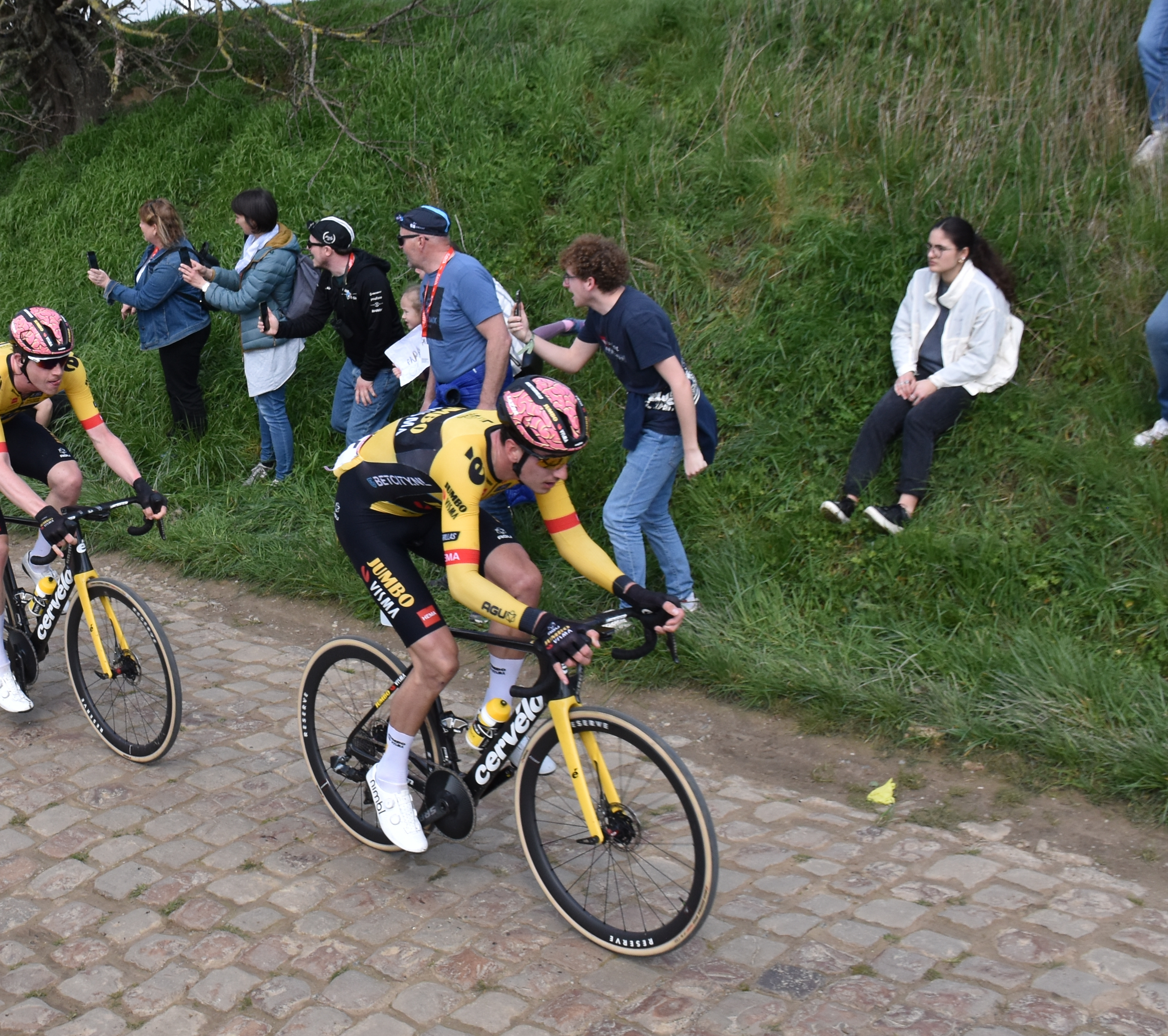
Paris-Roubaix 2023 - Secteur pavé de Quiévy à Saint-Python - N° 5 Tim van Dijke.

Tim van Dijke (born 15 March 2000) is a Dutch professional racing cyclist, who currently rides for UCI WorldTeam Red Bull–Bora–Hansgrohe. His twin brother Mick also rides for Red Bull–Bora–Hansgrohe.

== Major results ==
2019
1st Ronde van Oud-Vossemeer
2020
9th Overall Tour Bitwa Warszawska 1920
2021 (1 pro win)
National Under-23 Road Championships

1st Road race
2nd Time trial

1st Stage 6 CRO Race
2nd Ster van Zwolle
6th Coppa della Pace
7th Overall Kreiz Breizh Elites

1st Stage 1 (TTT)

9th Overall Flanders Tomorrow Tour
2022 (1)
1st Prologue (TTT) Tour de l'Avenir
1st Prologue Sibiu Cycling Tour
1st Mountains classification, Sazka Tour
4th Flanders Tomorrow Tour
2023
2nd Grand Prix de Denain
6th Overall ZLM Tour
2026
2nd Omloop Het Nieuwsblad
4th Overall ZLM Tour

=== Grand Tour general classification results timeline ===
Grand Tour	2024	2025	2026
Giro d'Italia	105	—	—
Tour de France	—	—	111
Vuelta a España	—	138	—

Legend
—	Did not compete
DNF	Did not finish
