= 2026 Paris–Tours =

- 2026 UCI ProSeries

Race details
- Dates: 11 October 2026
- Stages: 1
- Distance: 216.2 km (134.3 mi)
- Winning time: 4h 31' 46"

Results
	Winner	Per Strand Hagenes (NOR)	(Visma–Lease a Bike)
	Second	Jasper Stuyven (BEL)	(Soudal–Quick-Step)
	Third	Christophe Laporte (FRA)	(Visma–Lease a Bike)

The 2026 Paris–Tours was the 120th edition of the Paris–Tours road cycling classic. It was held on 11 October 2026 as part of the 2026 UCI ProSeries calendar.

== Teams ==
Twelve UCI WorldTeams, eight UCI ProTeams, and four UCI Continental teams made up the twenty-four teams that participated in the race.

UCI WorldTeams

- Alpecin–Premier Tech
- Decathlon CMA CGM
- Groupama–FDJ United
- Lidl–Trek
- Lotto–Intermarché
- Netcompany INEOS
- NSN Cycling Team
- Soudal–Quick-Step
- Team Picnic–PostNL
- Visma–Lease a Bike
- Uno-X Mobility
- XDS Astana Team

UCI ProTeams

- Caja Rural–Seguros RGA
- Cofidis
- Modern Adventure Pro Cycling
- Pinarello–Q36.5 Pro Cycling Team
- Team Flanders–Baloise
- Team TotalEnergies
- Tudor Pro Cycling Team
- Unibet Rose Rockets

UCI Continental Teams

- CIC Pro Cycling Academy
- Nice Métropole Côte d'Azur
- St. Michel–Preference Home–Auber93
- Van Rysel–Roubaix

== Results ==
Result
Rank	Rider	Team	Time
1	Per Strand Hagenes (NOR)	Visma–Lease a Bike	4h 31' 46"
2	Jasper Stuyven (BEL)	Soudal–Quick-Step	+ 2"
3	Christophe Laporte (FRA)	Visma–Lease a Bike	+ 2"
4	Matys Grisel (FRA)	Lotto–Intermarché	+ 2"
5	Jonas Abrahamsen (NOR)	Uno-X Mobility	+ 2"
6	Paul Lapeira (FRA)	Decathlon CMA CGM	+ 2"
7	Thibaud Gruel (FRA)	Groupama–FDJ United	+ 2"
8	Lewis Askey (GBR)	NSN Cycling Team	+ 2"
9	Florian Sénéchal (FRA)	Alpecin–Premier Tech	+ 2"
10	Toms Skujiņš (LAT)	Lidl–Trek	+ 9"
