= Rose Bikes =

German bicycle manufacturer

ROSE Bikes
- Type: Private
- Industry: Bicycle industry
- Founded: 1907; 119 years ago
- Founder: Heinrich Rose
- Headquarters: Bocholt, Germany
- Number of locations: 2
- Products: E-Bike, MTB, Trekkingbike, Equipment
- Owner: Erwin Rose, Stefanie Rose, Thorsten Heckrath-Rose
- Number of employees: 410
- Website: rosebikes.com

Rose Bikes GmbH (stylized in short form as ROSE, formerly Rose Versand GmbH) is a German bicycle manufacturer from Bocholt in the Münsterland region of North Rhine-Westphalia.

== History ==
In 1907, Heinrich Rose founded the first bicycle shop in the Westphalian city of Bocholt. In 1932, Heinrich Rose, Jr., took over the management and opened a bicycle shop in the city, consisting of 30 square metres. To get affluent clientele, the shop applied the slogan “The price is cheapest in the smallest shop.” During winter most of ROSEs business consisted of selling Dürkopp sewing machines. In 1970, Heinrich’s sons Erwin and Walter took over the management of ROSE.

In 1982, the first printed catalogue was published in black and white with 64 pages and a print run of 4,000 copies. In the 1990s, ROSE’s mail order business grew and the company moved into its new premises at Schersweide 4, which offered 3,800m² of space for storage, commissioning and the shipping of parcels, for bike assembly, administration and catalogue production. The mail order business employed 55 staff, while a further 20 staff worked in the shop. After 2000 ROSE opened the “biketown” in Bocholt with over 6,000 m² and set a new benchmark.

Today ROSE Bikes has 227 employees and a turnover of 60 million euros. Since 2014 there is also a “BIKETOWN” with 300 square metres in Munich, which was honored with the “Stores of the year Award” by the German Trade Association.

== Sponsoring ==
ROSE sponsors the following riders and teams:

- Unibet Rose Rockets
- Team Stölting Service Group
- ROSE Vaujany ultraSPORTS
- LKT-Team-Brandenburg
- Team Roseversand Bocholter WSV
- Roseteam Münsterland
- Roseteam NRW
- Rose Factory Racing Team (Mountain bike)
- Rad-net Rose Team (Continental Team)
- Bobby Root and Jakub Vencl (Freerider)
- Mareen Hufe (Triathlete)
- Laura Lindemann (Triathlete)
- Marcel Kittel (retired professional cyclist)
- Lucas Huppert (Slopestyle)
