= Nils Eekhoff =

Dutch cyclist (born 1998)

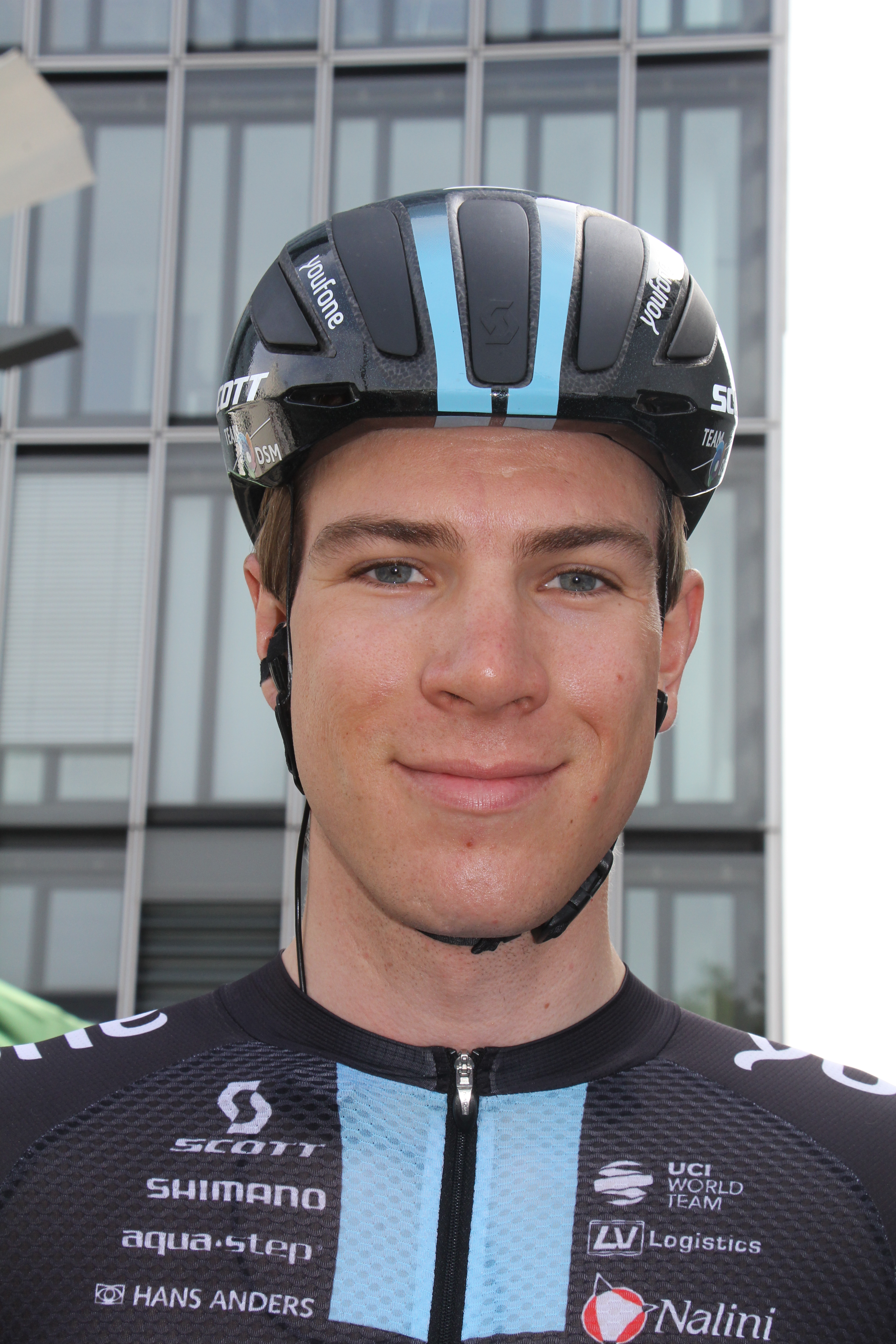
- Eekhoff in 2023

Personal information
- Full name: Nils Eekhoff
- Born: 23 January 1998 (age 28) Rijsenhout, Netherlands
- Height: 1.92 m (6 ft 4 in)
- Weight: 75 kg (165 lb)

Cycling career
- Sport: Cycling
- Current team: Team Picnic–PostNL
- Discipline: Road
- Role: Rider

Amateur team
- 2016: Wilton

Professional teams
- 2017–2019: Development Team Sunweb
- 2018: Team Sunweb (stagiaire)
- 2019: Team Sunweb (stagiaire)
- 2020–: Team Sunweb

Major wins
- One-day races and Classics Nokere Koerse (2025)

Nils Eekhoff (born 23 January 1998) is a Dutch cyclist, who currently rides for UCI WorldTeam Team Picnic–PostNL.

== Career ==
Eekhoff joined Development Team Sunweb in 2017, notably winning Paris–Roubaix Espoirs. In August 2019, Eekhoff joined UCI WorldTeam Team Sunweb as a stagiaire for the second half of the season, before joining the team permanently in 2020.

At the under 23 road race of the 2019 UCI Road World Championships, Eekhoff initially won the race, but was later disqualified for illegal drafting behind a team car.

He took his first professional win on the prologue of the 2023 ZLM Tour.

== Major results ==
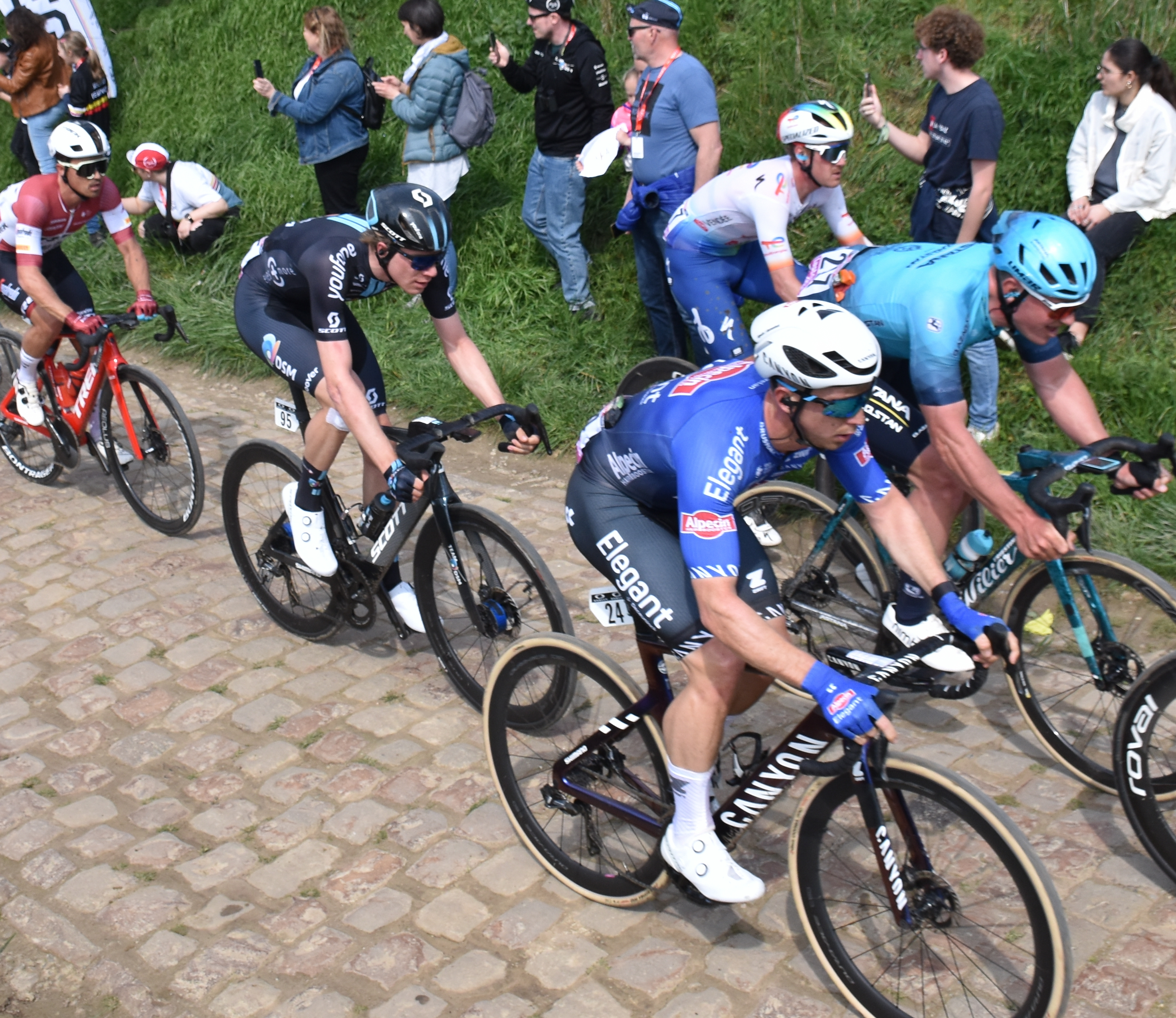
Paris-Roubaix 2023 - Secteur pavé de Quiévy à Saint-Python - N° 95 Nils Eekhoff.

2016
1st Stage 4 Peace Race Juniors
2nd Overall Ronde des vallées

1st Stage 2

2nd Paris–Roubaix Juniors
2017
1st Paris–Roubaix Espoirs
6th Grand Prix Criquielion
8th Poreč Trophy
2018
1st Prologue Istrian Spring Trophy
2nd Time trial, National Under-23 Road Championships
3rd Paris–Tours Espoirs
9th Paris–Bourges
2019
1st Ronde van Overijssel
1st Prologue Grand Prix Priessnitz spa
National Under-23 Road Championships

2nd Road race
4th Time trial

3rd Overall Tour de Bretagne

1st Stage 7

5th Road race, UEC European Under-23 Road Championships
6th Overall Le Triptyque des Monts et Châteaux
7th Time trial, UCI Road World Under-23 Championships
8th Paris–Bourges
2020
2nd Road race, National Road Championships
2nd Dwars door het Hageland
7th Bretagne Classic
2021
6th Overall Boucles de la Mayenne

1st Young rider classification

8th Ronde van Drenthe
2023 (1 pro win)
3rd Overall ZLM Tour

1st Prologue

3rd Tro-Bro Léon
4th Münsterland Giro
2024
1st Stage 1 (TTT) Danmark Rundt
5th Kuurne–Brussels–Kuurne
8th Münsterland Giro
9th Elfstedenrace
2025 (1)
1st Nokere Koerse
2nd Binche–Chimay–Binche
3rd Bredene Koksijde Classic
5th Road race, National Road Championships

=== Grand Tour general classification results timeline ===
Grand Tour	2021	2022	2023	2024
Giro d'Italia	—	—	—	—
Tour de France	126	119	138	DNF
Vuelta a España	—	—	—	—

Legend
—	Did not compete
DNF	Did not finish
