= Bas Tietema =

Dutch cyclist (born 1995)

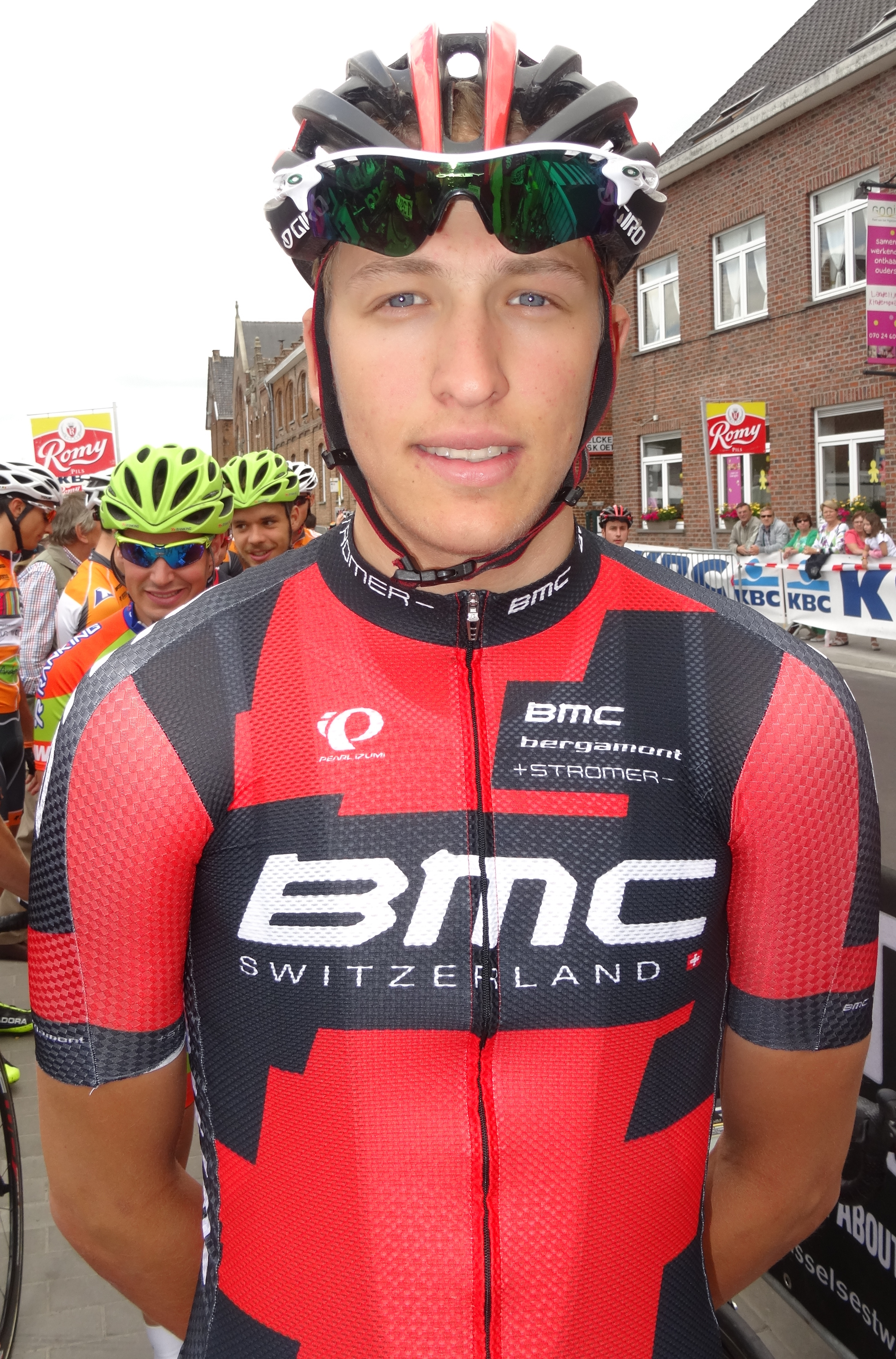
- Tietema at the 2014 Internationale Wielertrofee Jong Maar Moedig.

Personal information
- Born: 29 January 1995 (age 31) Zwolle, Netherlands
- Height: 1.85 m (6 ft 1 in)
- Weight: 74 kg (163 lb)

Cycling career
- Sport: Cycling
- Current team: Unibet Rose Rockets
- Discipline: Road
- Role: Rider; Directeur sportif

Amateur teams
- 2013: Vacansoleil Niederland Junioren
- 2014–2016: BMC Development Team
- 2019–2020: Allinq–Krush–de IJsselstreek
- 2021: Tour de Tietema Cycling Team

Professional teams
- 2017: An Post–Chain Reaction
- 2018: BEAT Cycling Club
- 2022: Bingoal Pauwels Sauces WB
- 2023: TDT–Unibet Cycling Team

Managerial team
- 2023–: TDT–Unibet Cycling Team

Bas Tietema (born 29 January 1995) is a Dutch former cyclist, who competed as a professional from 2017 to 2018 and again from 2022 to 2023. He runs the Tour de Tietema YouTube channel and founded UCI ProTeam Unibet Rose Rockets in 2023.

== Career ==
Tietema originally played football in his childhood, but began cycling in 2010. After a fairly successful junior and under-23 career, Tietema retired from competition in 2019 due to skin allergies and loss of motivation. He then started a YouTube channel known as Tour de Tietema, where he uploads cycling videos with friends Josse Wester and Devin van der Wiel. As of May 2022, the channel has more than 250,000 subscribers. In 2021, the group started an amateur team known as the Tour de Tietema Cycling Team, as a challenge to attempt to win local races. Tietema gained back his desire to race, and then came in contact with UCI ProTeam Bingoal Pauwels Sauces WB after reportedly seeing improvements in his fitness. In February 2022, he returned to professional cycling after officially joining Bingoal Pauwels Sauces WB.

== Founding of TDT–Unibet Cycling Team ==
In 2023, Tietema founded his own UCI Continental team, TDT–Unibet Cycling Team, partnering with Unibet. Tietema competed for the team in its inaugural year and served as Assistant Sports Director during the 2023–2024 seasons. The team remained under the same name in 2024, and was elevated to the UCI ProTeam ranking. In 2025, the team name was changed to Unibet Tietema Rockets. In the announcement video, Tietema expressed, "We strongly believe that we do sports for the fans," emphasizing that establishing "The Rockets" as a franchise name aimed to create a lasting identity for supporters. The Tour de Tietema YouTube channel produced a few documentaries following the team at races including Amstel Gold race. A second channel Unibet Tietema Rockets was built to highlight the cycling team and its riders, and to provide fans with behind-the-scenes experiences.

== Major results ==
2013
Keizer der Juniores

1st Mountains classification
1st Stage 1

4th Overall Ronde des Vallées

1st Stage 2 (ITT)

6th Overall Driedaagse van Axel
7th Grand Prix Bati-Metallo
2014
3rd Paris–Roubaix Espoirs
2015
10th Paris–Roubaix Espoirs
2016
8th Overall Tour de Berlin

1st Prologue (TTT)

2017
Tour Alsace

1st Points classification
1st Combativity classification
1st Km 70 classification

3rd Time trial, National Under-23 Road Championships
2024
1st Turbo Cross Diegem
