= Joren Bloem =

Dutch cyclist (born 1999)

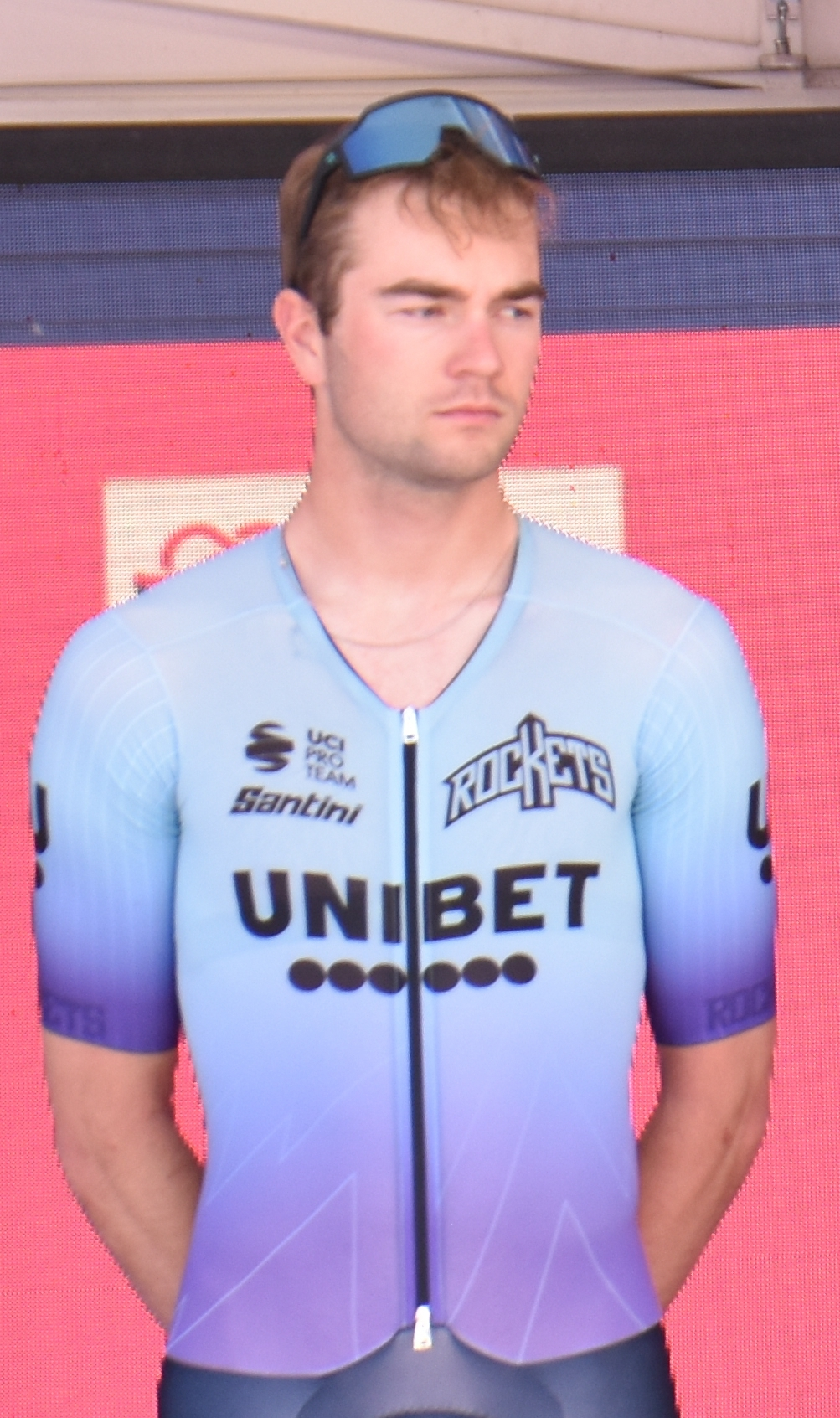
- Bloem in 2025

Personal information
- Full name: Joren Bloem
- Nickname: Flower Power
- Born: 21 December 1999 (age 26) Hall, Brummen, Netherlands

Cycling career
- Sport: Cycling
- Current team: Unibet Rose Rockets
- Discipline: Road
- Role: Rider
- Rider type: Sprinter

Amateur team
- 2018–2021: Sensa–Kanjers voor Kanjers

Professional teams
- 2022: Abloc CT
- 2023–: TDT–Unibet Cycling Team

Joren Bloem (born 21 December 1999) is a Dutch cyclist, who currently rides for UCI ProTeam Unibet Rose Rockets.

== Major results ==
2021
5th Road race, National Under-23 Road Championships
5th Overall Carpathian Couriers Race
2022
3rd Overall Olympia's Tour
3rd Ronde van Overijssel
3rd Grand Prix Justiniano Race
4th PWZ Zuidenveld Tour
4th Ronde van de Achterhoek
5th Ronde van Drenthe
7th Fyen Rundt
7th Visit Friesland Elfsteden Race
2023
4th Ster van Zwolle
8th Overall ZLM Tour
9th Van Merksteijn Fences Classic
2024
1st Points classification,, Sibiu Cycling Tour
2025
6th Famenne Ardenne Classic
8th Omloop van het Houtland
2026
3rd Circuit de Wallonie
5th Grand Prix d'Isbergues
5th Tour de Vendée
