= Unibet Rose Rockets =

Dutch cycling team

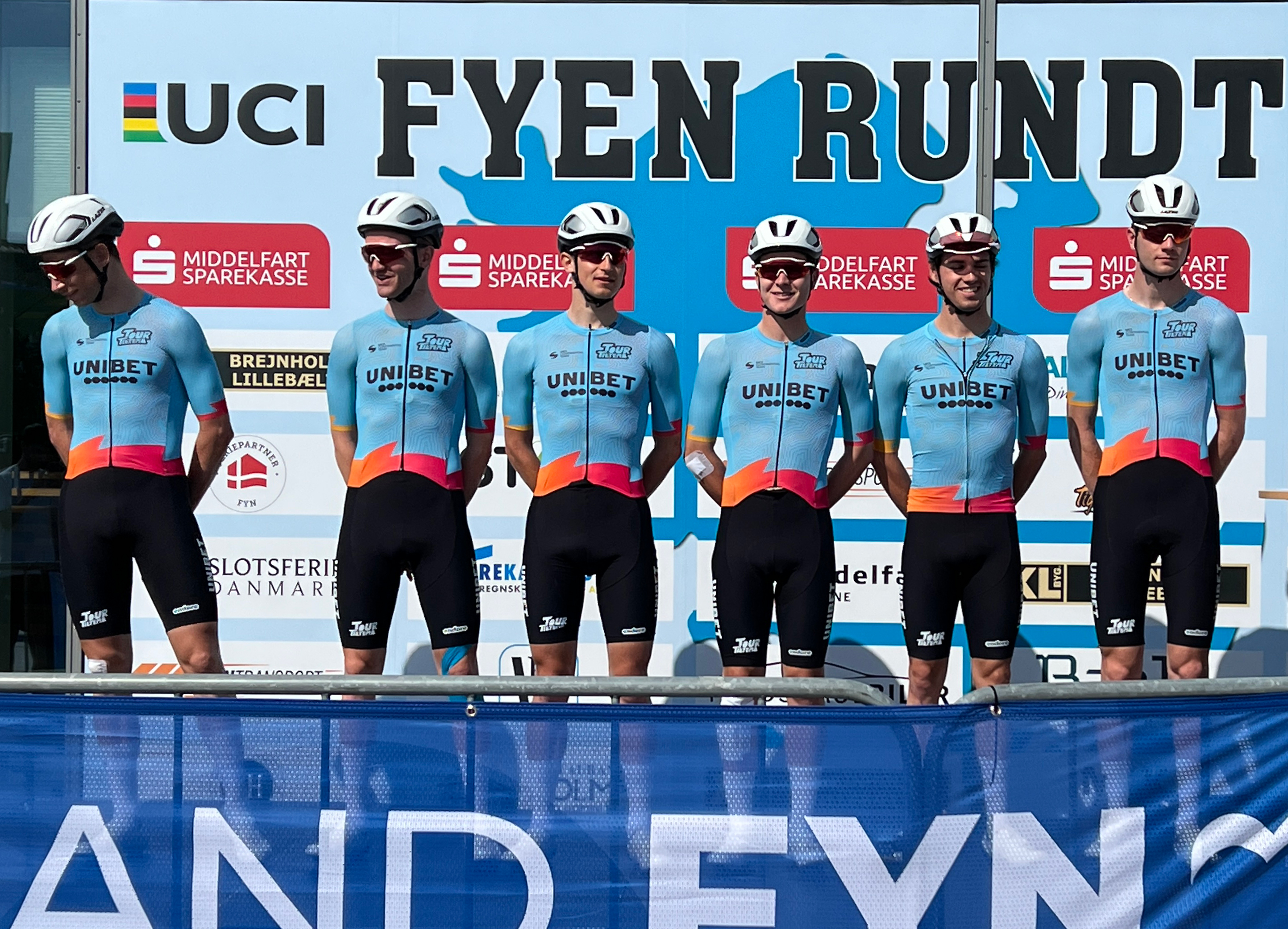
- The team at the 2023 Fyen Rundt

Team information
- UCI code: URR
- Registered: France
- Founded: 2023
- Discipline: Road
- Status: UCI Continental (2023); UCI ProTeam (2024–)
- Bicycles: Rose Bikes
- Website: Team home page

Key personnel
- General manager: Julia Soek and Josse Wester
- Team managers: Rob Harmeling; Bas Tietema; Sverre Vik; Gaëtan Pons

Team name history
- 2023–2024; 2025; 2026–: TDT–Unibet Cycling Team; Unibet Tietema Rockets; Unibet Rose Rockets

The Unibet Rose Rockets are a Dutch UCI ProTeam status cycling team on a French license focusing on road bicycle racing. Bas Tietema created the team in 2023. The team upgraded from UCI Continental to UCI ProTeam status in 2024.

== History ==
The main sponsor of the team is Unibet. They previously sponsored a different team in 2006/2007 (Unibet.com). However, owing to a dispute with major race organizers over gambling companies being sponsors they pulled out. Now with other teams having sponsors which are lotteries, Unibet decided to come back to professional cycling, although from 2028 teams sponsored by gambling companies will not be able to race in Belgium.

=== 2023 ===
Hugo Haak joined as Team Manager in 2023 after coaching on the Track for the past few years.

The team's calendar for 2023 consisted of mostly Belgian and Dutch races. The team's biggest victory was stage 1 of the ZLM Tour by Yentl Vandevelde. Despite this success, Vandevelde was let go by the team for 2024.

=== 2024 ===
They started their season with 12 new riders, and started their first race in Turkey at the Tour of Antalya where they won stage 1 with the rider Hartthijs de Vries. They then participated in their first UCI WorldTour race, the Amstel Gold Race. The team went on to win the general classification and a stage in the Oberösterreich Rundfahrt. In the summer of 2024, they rode their second UCI World Tour race the Renewi Tour, Davide Bomboi took a top 10 result. By the end of the year, the team announced that it would be renamed to Unibet Tietema Rockets and would ride on a French license from 2025 on.

=== 2025 ===
Results included a victory at the Cholet-Pays de la Loire by new rider Lukáš Kubiš and a victory in Paris–Camembert by Lander Lookx. The team also gained entry to larger races more frequently: their participation in cycling monument Paris-Roubaix through a wildcard was a key milestone. At the same time, the season was not without setbacks: new rider Giovanni Carboni became involved in a doping case and ultimately left the team. The team ended the year with the signings of experienced riders such as Dylan Groenewegen, Wout Poels and Victor Lafay. A partnership with Rose Bikes lead to a change in team name: from 2026, the team is named Unibet Rose Rockets.

=== 2026 ===
In March 2026, the team won their first UCI World Tour race, with Groenewegen winning the Tour of Bruges. The team was invited to the Giro d'Italia, but missed out on an invite to the Tour de France, despite media expectations.

== Equipment ==
The team will be using Rose Bikes in the 2026 Season.

== Team roster ==
As of 16 March 2026.

Rider	Date of birth
Ronan Augé (FRA)	29 April 2004 (age 22)
Joren Bloem (NED)	21 December 1999 (age 26)
Cedrik Bakke Christophersen (NOR)	11 December 2001 (age 24)
Hartthijs de Vries (NED)	11 July 1996 (age 30)
Odd Christian Eiking (NOR)	28 December 1994 (age 31)
Karsten Larsen Feldmann (NOR)	28 March 2003 (age 23)
Eivind Broholt Fougner (NOR)	2 March 2003 (age 23)
Owen Geleijn (NED)	14 January 2001 (age 25)
Dylan Groenewegen (NED)	21 June 1993 (age 33)
Jelle Johannink (NED)	22 October 1996 (age 29)
Tomáš Kopecký (CZE)	8 April 2000 (age 26)
Matyáš Kopecký (CZE)	19 January 2003 (age 23)
Lukáš Kubiš (SVK)	31 January 2000 (age 26)
Victor Lafay (FRA)	17 January 1996 (age 30)
Niklas Larsen (DNK)	22 March 1997 (age 29)

Rider	Date of birth
Lander Loockx (BEL)	25 April 1997 (age 29)
Adrien Maire (FRA)	17 November 2000 (age 25)
Sergio Meris (ITA)	10 March 2001 (age 25)
Wessel Mouris (NED)	30 December 2002 (age 23)
Tobias Müller (GER)	31 March 2004 (age 22)
Jannis Peter (GER)	30 October 2000 (age 25)
Wout Poels (NED)	1 October 1987 (age 38)
Elmar Reinders (NED)	14 March 1992 (age 34)
Martijn Rasenberg (NED)	9 November 2001 (age 24)
Colin Savioz (FRA)	11 June 2004 (age 22)
Abram Stockman (BEL)	31 July 1996 (age 30)
Adam Ťoupalík (CZE)	9 May 1996 (age 30)
Rory Townsend (IRL)	30 June 1995 (age 31)
Clément Venturini (FRA)	16 October 1993 (age 32)
Killian Verschuren (FRA)	20 October 2002 (age 23)

== Major wins ==
2023
Stage 1 ZLM Tour, Yentl Vandevelde
Overall Kreiz Breizh Elites, Hartthijs de Vries

Stage 3, Tomáš Kopecký

2024
Stage 4 Tour of Antalya, Hartthijs de Vries
Ster van Zwolle, Nicklas Amdi Pedersen
Overall Oberösterreich Rundfahrt, Adrien Maire

Stage 3, Adrien Maire

2025
Cholet Agglo Tour, Lukáš Kubiš
Paris–Camembert, Lander Loockx
Stage 4 International Tour of Hellas, Adrien Maire
Slovakia Road Race Championships, Lukáš Kubiš
Stage 7 Tour de Langkawi, Zeb Kyffin
2026
Clàssica Comunitat Valenciana, Dylan Groenewegen
Bredene Koksijde Classic, Dylan Groenewegen
Grote Prijs Jean-Pierre Monseré, Dylan Groenewegen
Tour of Bruges, Dylan Groenewegen
La Roue Tourangelle, Clément Venturini

=== Supplementary statistics ===
Grand Tours by highest finishing position
Race	2024	2025	2026
Giro d'Italia	–	–	22
Tour de France	–	–	–
Vuelta a España	–	–	–
Major week-long stage races by highest finishing position
Race	2024	2025	2026
Tour Down Under	–	–	–
Paris–Nice	–	–	–
Tirreno–Adriatico	–	–	–
Volta a Catalunya	–	–	–
Tour of the Basque Country	–	–	–
Tour de Romandie	–	–	
Critérium du Dauphiné	–	–	–
Tour de Suisse	–	–	
Tour de Pologne	–	–	
Renewi Tour	30	23	
Tour of Guangxi	-	-	
Monuments by highest finishing position
Monument	2024	2025	2026
Milan–San Remo	–	–	50
Tour of Flanders	–	–	25
Paris–Roubaix	–	27	30
Liège–Bastogne–Liège	–	–	–
Il Lombardia	–	–	
Classics (1.UWT) by highest finishing position
Classic	2024	2025	2026
Cadel Evans Great Ocean Road Race	–	–	–
Omloop Het Nieuwsblad	–	6	12
Strade Bianche	–	–	22
Tour de Bruges	–	13	1
E3 Saxo Classic	–	–	28
Gent–Wevelgem	–	–	19
Dwars door Vlaanderen	–	–	11
Amstel Gold Race	55	47	34
La Flèche Wallonne	–	–	17
Eschborn–Frankfurt	–	–	31
Copenhagen Sprint	DNE	21	38
Clásica de San Sebastián	–	–	-
Hamburg Cyclassics	–	–	16
Bretagne Classic	–	–	15
Grand Prix Cycliste de Québec	–	–	-
Grand Prix Cycliste de Montréal	–	–	-

Legend
—	Did not compete
DNS	Did not start
DNF	Did not finish
DNE	Did not exist
NH	Not held
