= Méral =

- Commune
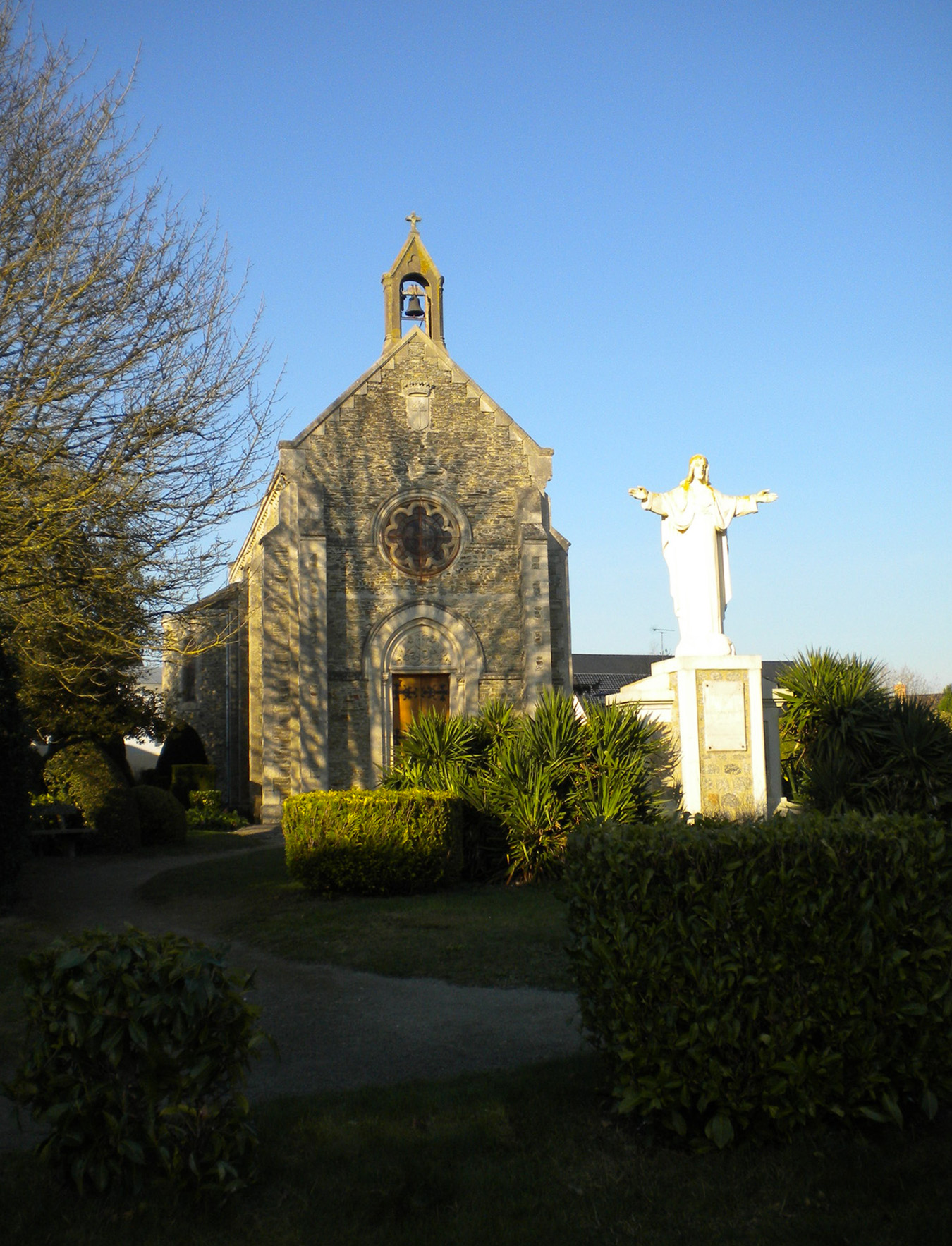
- The Chapel of the Saint, in Méral

- Coat of arms
- Location of Méral
- Location within France Location within Pays de la Loire
- Coordinates: 47°57′41″N 0°58′46″W
- Country: France
- Region: Pays de la Loire
- Department: Mayenne
- Arrondissement: Château-Gontier
- Canton: Cossé-le-Vivien

Government
  - Mayor (2020–2026): Richard Chamaret
- Area^{1}: 29.5 km^{2} (11.4 sq mi)
- Elevation: 95 m (312 ft)
- Highest elevation: 102 m (335 ft)
- Lowest elevation: 59 m (194 ft)
- Population (2023): 1,053
  - Density: 35.7/km^{2} (92.4/sq mi)
- Time zone: UTC+01:00 (CET)
  - Summer (DST): UTC+02:00 (CEST)
- INSEE/Postal code: 53151 /53230
- ^{1} French Land Register data, which excludes lakes, ponds, glaciers > 1 km^{2} (0.386 sq mi or 247 acres) and river estuaries.

Méral (French pronunciation: [meʁal]) is a commune in the Mayenne department in north-western France.

== Geography ==
The Oudon River forms part of the commune's north-eastern border.

== See also ==
- Communes of Mayenne
