= 's-Heerenhoek =

- Village
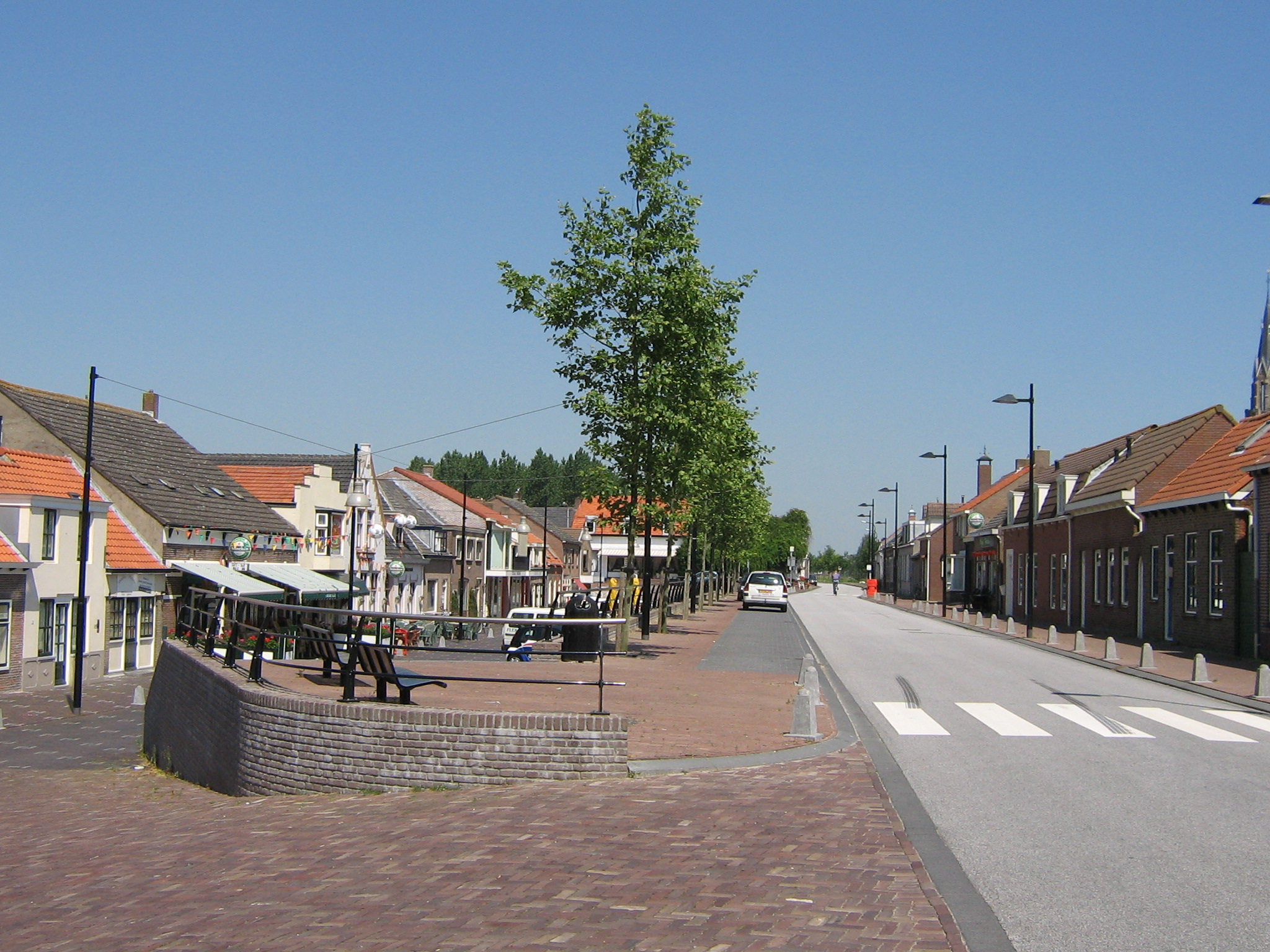
- Street view

- Coat of arms

- Location in the province of Zeeland in the Netherlands 's-Heerenhoek (Netherlands)
- Coordinates: 51°27′12″N 3°46′10″E
- Country: Netherlands
- Province: Zeeland
- Municipality: Borsele

Area
  - Total: 9.09 km^{2} (3.51 sq mi)
- Elevation: 1.7 m (5.6 ft)

Population (2021)
  - Total: 1,975
  - Density: 217/km^{2} (563/sq mi)
- Time zone: UTC+1 (CET)
  - Summer (DST): UTC+2 (CEST)
- Postal code: 4453
- Dialing code: 0113

's-Heerenhoek is a village in the Dutch province of Zeeland. It is a part of the municipality of Borsele, and lies about 12 km east of Middelburg.

== History ==
The village was first mentioned around 1750 as 'S Heerenhoek, and "means corner of the lord". It is located in the north-eastern corner of the Borsselepolder which was poldered in 1616. The lords refers to the lord of Schenge Castle in 's-Heer-Arendskerke. 's-Heerenhoek developed after 1616 in a grid structure. In 1669, the village was devastated by fire and a new church was built in 1672.

The Dutch Reformed church from 1672 was moved to Netherlands Open Air Museum in Arnhem between 1987 and 1988. The village developed into a Catholic area from the 1760s onwards. The Catholic St Willibrordus Church was built between 1873 and 1874 in Gothic Revival style and has a tall tower.

's-Heerenhoek was home to 772 people in 1840. The municipal council used to meet in the local inn. In 1881, it was outlawed to hold meetings in a locality which served alcohol. The problem was solved by separating a part of the inn and building its own front door. In 1892, a town hall was built.

's-Heerenhoek was a separate municipality until 1970 when it was merged into Borsele.

== Gallery ==
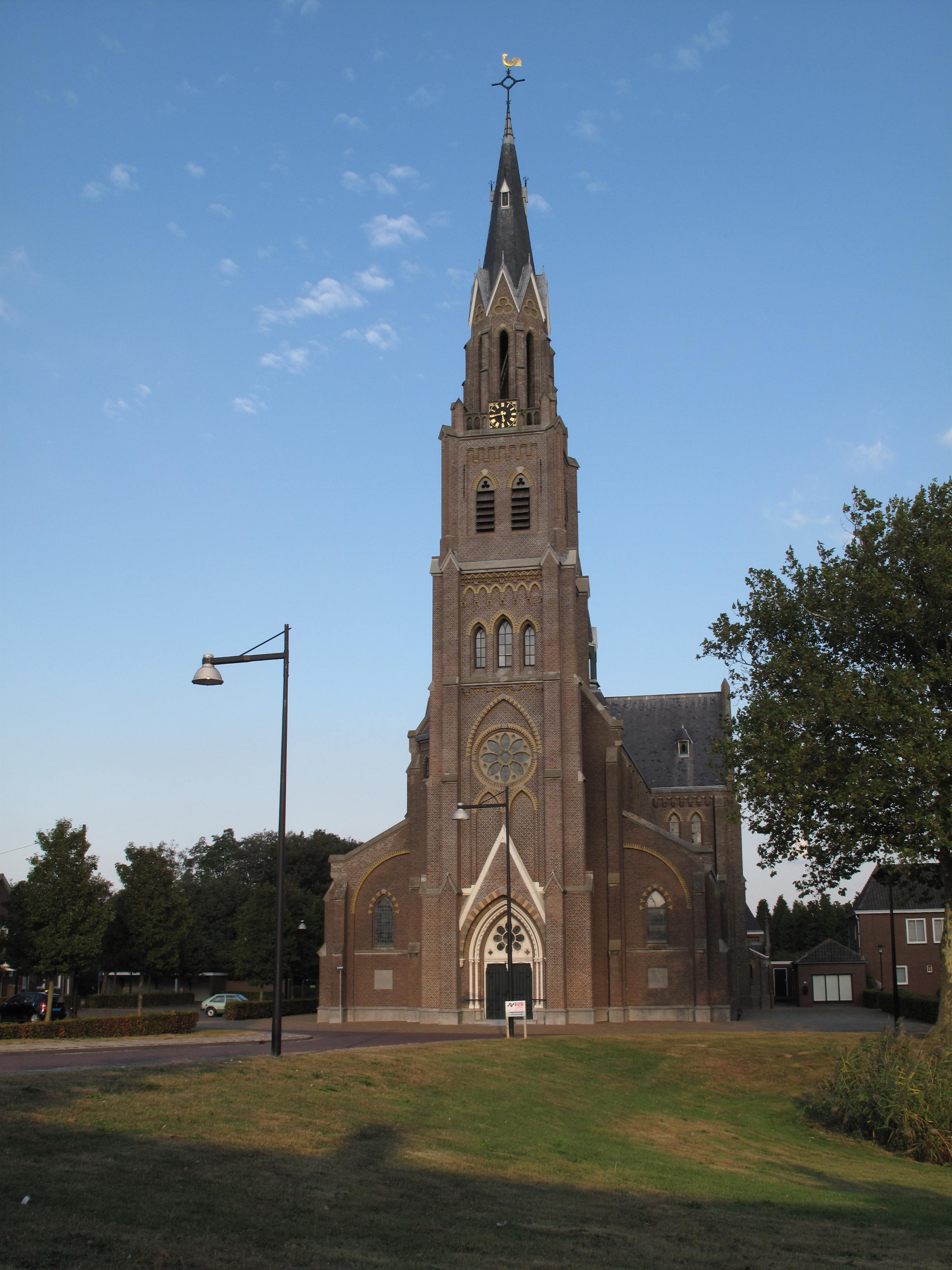
's-Heerenhoek, church

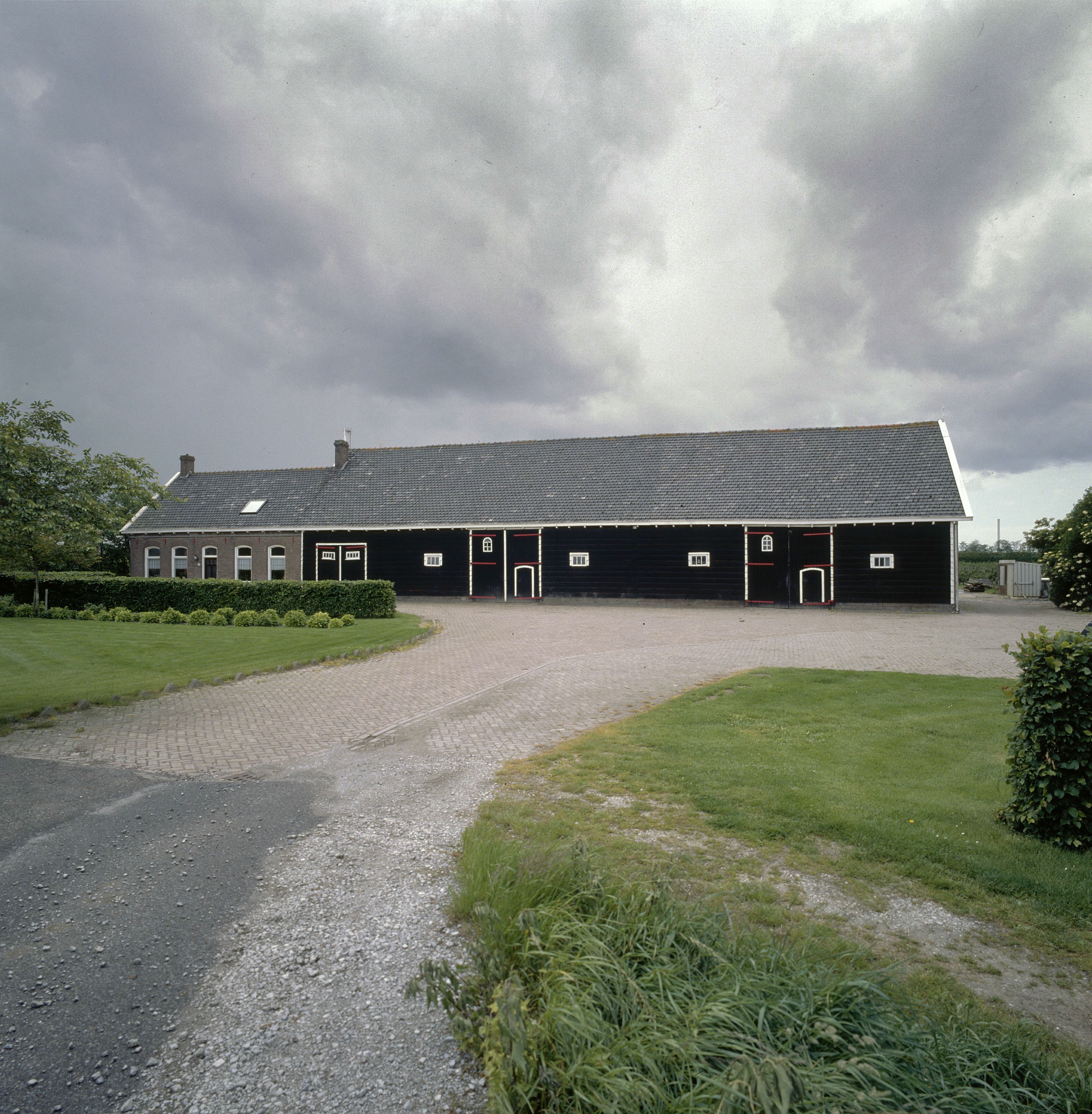
Farm in 's-Heerenhoek

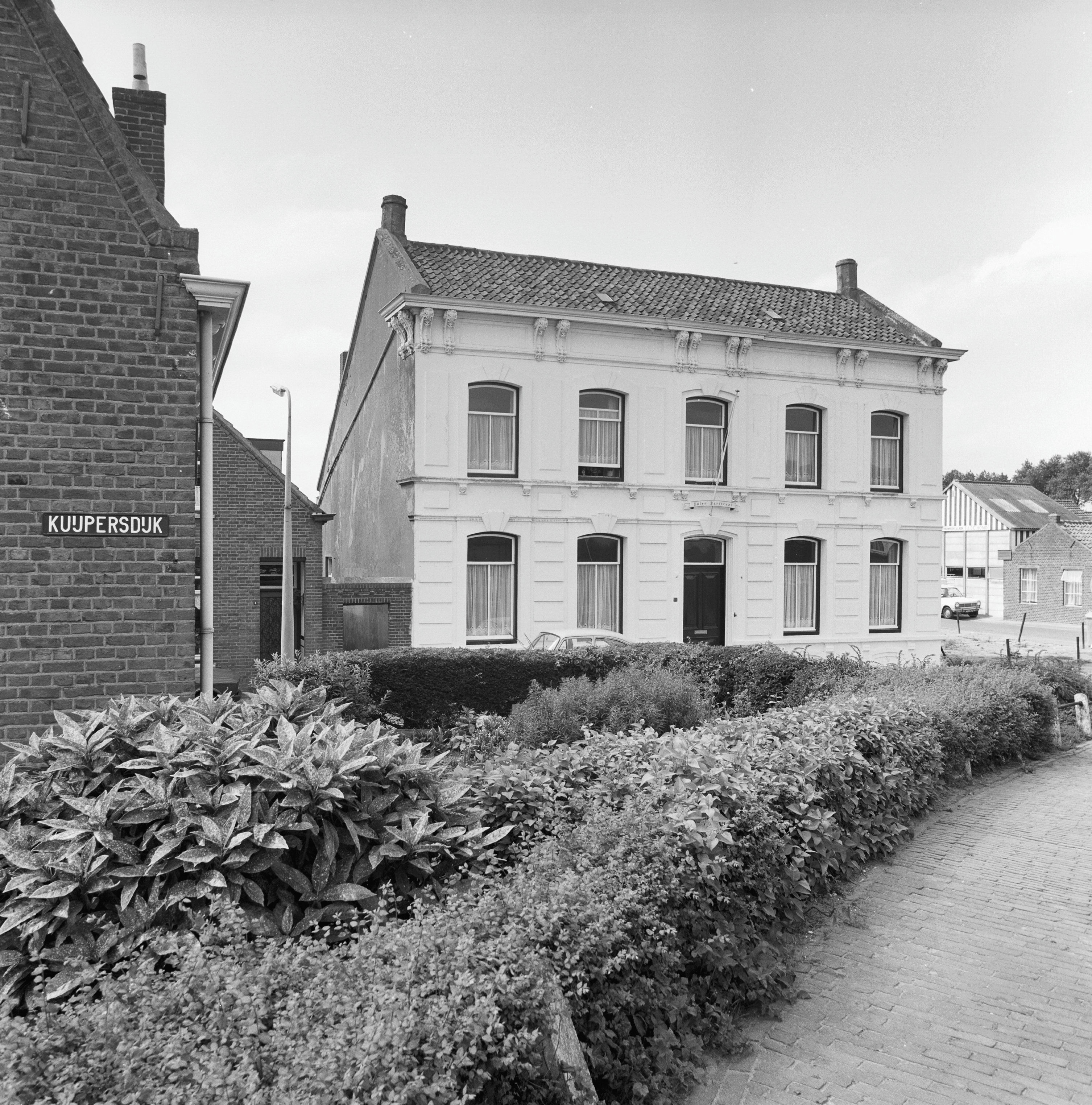
Former clergy house

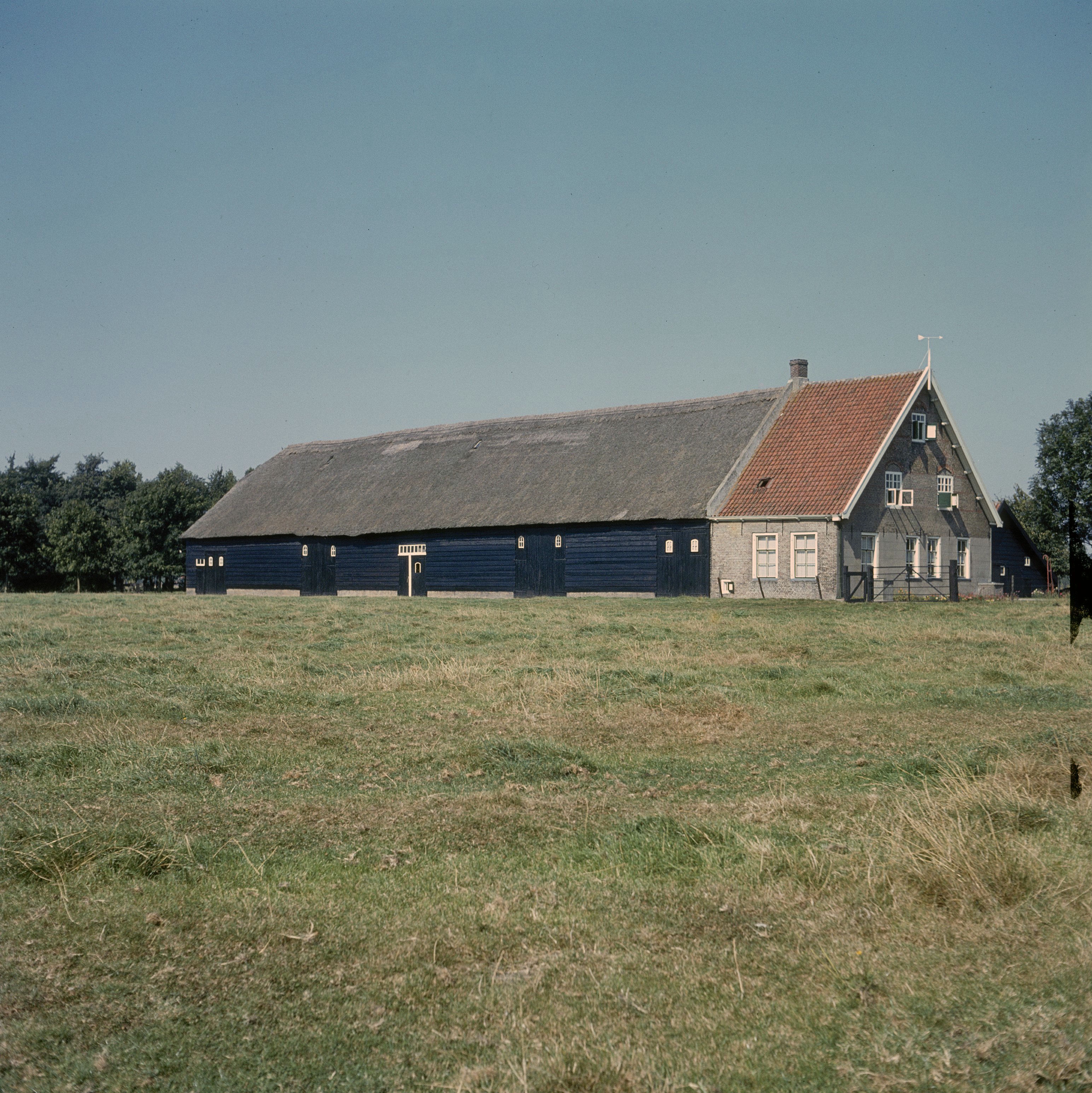
Farm in 's-Heerenhoek
