= Yentl Vandevelde =

Belgian cyclist (born 2000)

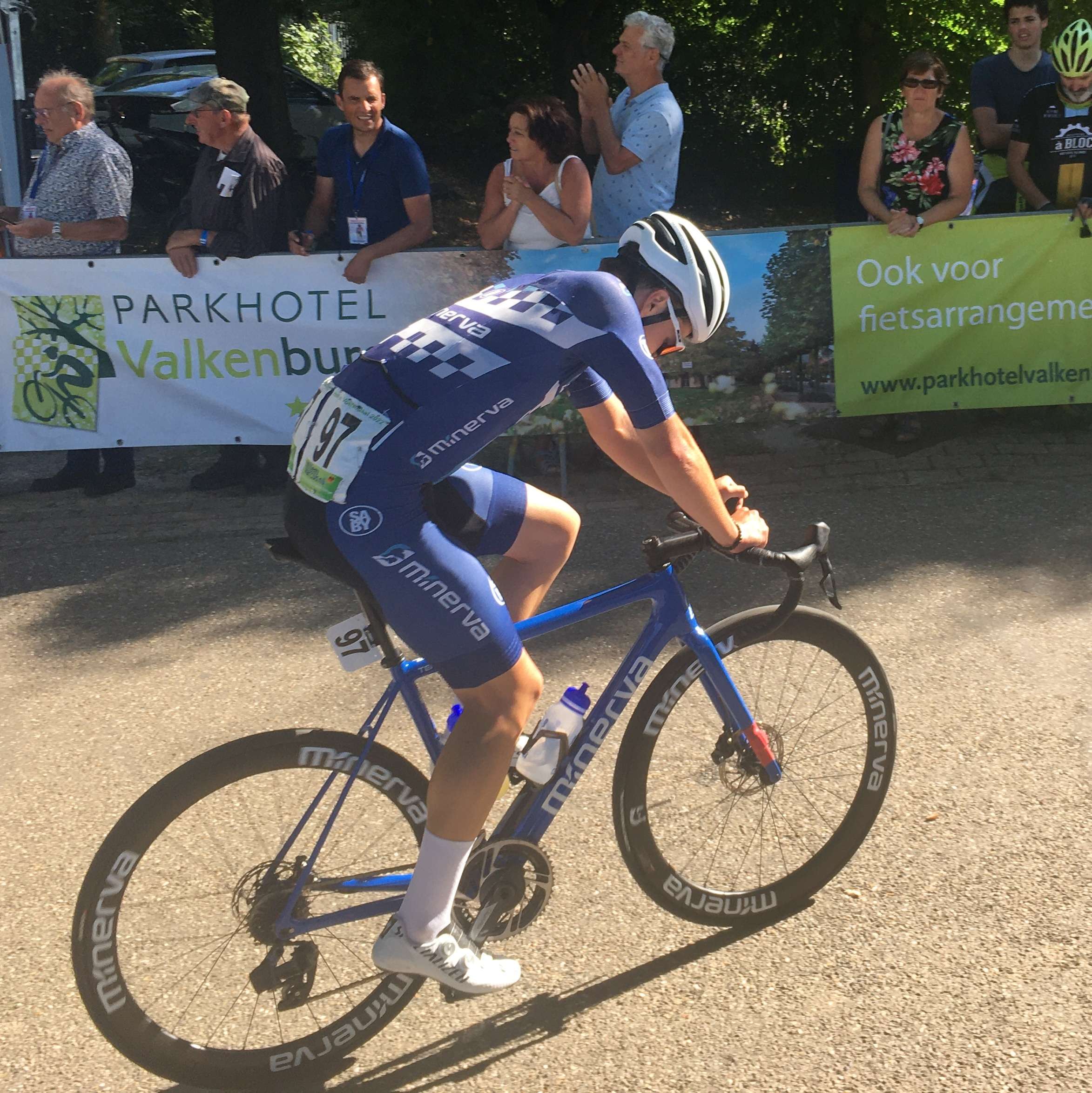
- Vandevelde in 2022

Personal information
- Born: 31 October 2000 (age 25) Ghent, Belgium
- Height: 1.79 m (5 ft 10 in)
- Weight: 69 kg (152 lb)

Cycling career
- Sport: Cycling
- Current team: Team Flanders–Baloise
- Discipline: Road
- Role: Rider

Amateur teams
- 2017–2018: Onders Ons Parike
- 2019: VDM Van Durme–Michiels–Trawobo CT
- 2020–2021: Davo-United CT

Professional teams
- 2022: Minerva Cycling Team
- 2023: TDT–Unibet Cycling Team
- 2024–: Team Flanders–Baloise

Yentl Vandevelde (born 31 October 2000) is a Belgian cyclist, who currently rides for UCI ProTeam Team Flanders–Baloise.

Vandevelde had a surprise victory from the breakaway on stage 1 of the 2023 ZLM Tour, a UCI ProSeries event. However, he was let go by TDT–Unibet Cycling Team for 2024 and later announced he would join Team Flanders–Baloise on a two-year contract.

== Major results ==
2018
10th Keizer der Juniores
2022
1st Internatie Reningelst
5th Omloop Het Nieuwsblad U23
2023 (1 pro win)
1st Stage 1 ZLM Tour
