= 2024 Paris–Tours =

- 2024 UCI ProSeries

Race details
- Dates: 6 October 2024
- Stages: 1
- Distance: 213.8 km (132.8 mi)
- Winning time: 5h 00' 27"

Results
	Winner	Christophe Laporte (FRA)	(Visma–Lease a Bike)
	Second	Mathias Vacek (CZE)	(Lidl–Trek)
	Third	Jasper Philipsen (BEL)	(Alpecin–Deceuninck)

The 2024 Paris–Tours was the 118th edition of the Paris–Tours road cycling classic. It was held on 6 October 2024 as part of the 2024 UCI ProSeries calendar.

== Teams ==
11 of the 18 UCI WorldTeams, eight UCI ProTeams, and four UCI Continental teams made up the 23 teams that participated in the race.

UCI WorldTeams

- Alpecin–Deceuninck
- Arkéa–B&B Hotels
- Astana Qazaqstan Team
- Cofidis
- Decathlon–AG2R La Mondiale
- Groupama–FDJ
- Intermarché–Wanty
- Lidl–Trek
- Team dsm–firmenich PostNL
- UAE Team Emirates
- Visma–Lease a Bike

UCI ProTeams

- Bingoal WB
- Equipo Kern Pharma
- Israel–Premier Tech
- Lotto–Dstny
- Q36.5 Pro Cycling Team
- Team TotalEnergies
- Tudor Pro Cycling Team
- Uno-X Mobility

UCI Continental Teams

- CIC U Nantes Atlantique
- Nice Métropole Côte d'Azur
- St. Michel–Mavic–Auber93
- Van Rysel–Roubaix

== Results ==
Result
Rank	Rider	Team	Time
1	Christophe Laporte (FRA)	Visma–Lease a Bike	5h 00' 27"
2	Mathias Vacek (CZE)	Lidl–Trek	+ 0"
3	Jasper Philipsen (BEL)	Alpecin–Deceuninck	+ 21"
4	Mike Teunissen (NED)	Intermarché–Wanty	+ 21"
5	Alexis Renard (FRA)	Cofidis	+ 21"
6	Cees Bol (NED)	Astana Qazaqstan Team	+ 21"
7	Arnaud de Lie (BEL)	Lotto–Dstny	+ 21"
8	Tom van Asbroeck (BEL)	Israel–Premier Tech	+ 21"
9	Fabio Christen (SUI)	Q36.5 Pro Cycling Team	+ 21"
10	Anthony Turgis (FRA)	Team TotalEnergies	+ 21"
