= Navaluenga =

- municipality
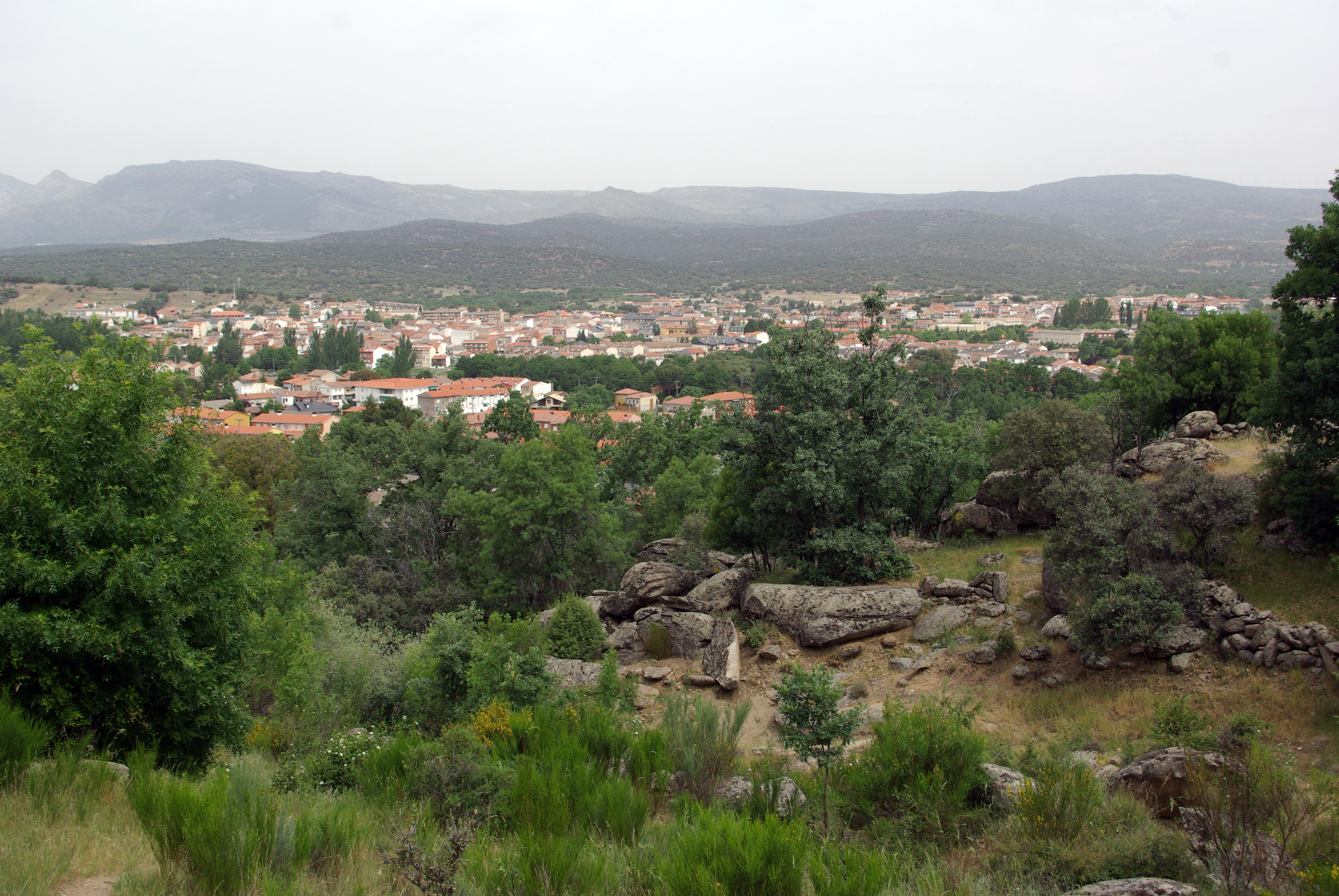
- General view of Navaluenga

- Location in Spain. Navaluenga (Spain)
- Coordinates: 40.4097°N 4.7081°W
- Country: Spain
- Autonomous community: Castile and León
- Province: Ávila
- Municipality: Navaluenga

Area
  - Total: 73 km^{2} (28 sq mi)

Population (2025-01-01)
  - Total: 2,135
  - Density: 29/km^{2} (76/sq mi)
- Time zone: UTC+1 (CET)
  - Summer (DST): UTC+2 (CEST)
- Website: Official website

Navaluenga is a municipality located in the province of Ávila, Castile and León, Spain.

== Population ==
Historical population
Year	Pop.	±% p.a.
2023	2,164	—
2024	2,172	+0.37%
2025	2,135	−1.70%
Source: INE
