= Minerva Cycling Team =

Belgian cycling team

Team information
- UCI code: MCT
- Registered: Belgium
- Founded: 2022
- Disbanded: 2022
- Discipline: Road
- Status: UCI Continental

Key personnel
- General manager: Gilbert Orbie
- Team managers: Preben Van Hecke; Ivo Myngheer

Team name history
- 2022: Minerva Cycling Team
Minerva Cycling Team jersey
Jersey

Minerva Cycling Team was a Belgian UCI Continental team founded in 2022.

== Team roster ==
As of 21 March 2022.

Rider	Date of birth
Gilles Borra (BEL)	26 July 1998 (age 28)
Kenneth Caethoven (BEL)	2 March 1999 (age 27)
Gil D'Heygere (BEL)	30 March 1998 (age 28)
Jorre Debaele (BEL)	7 September 2001 (age 24)
Angel Deckers (BEL)	25 September 2002 (age 23)
Enrico Dhaeye (BEL)	2 February 2001 (age 25)
Justin Houtekier (BEL)	2 May 2000 (age 26)
Thomas Joseph (BEL)	6 December 1996 (age 29)

Rider	Date of birth
Stefano Museeuw (BEL)	1 June 1997 (age 29)
Thibaut Ponsaerts (BEL)	21 June 2000 (age 26)
Kasper Saver (BEL)	26 November 2000 (age 25)
Jarne van Dyck (BEL)	16 November 2001 (age 24)
Robbe Van Praet (BEL)	5 November 2000 (age 25)
Matthew Van Schoor (BEL)	31 March 2000 (age 26)
Yentl Vandevelde (BEL)	31 October 2000 (age 25)
Thimo Willems (BEL)	9 February 1996 (age 30)
