= 2023 Renewi Tour =

2023 UCI World Tour, race 29 of 35

Race details
- Dates: 23–27 August 2023
- Stages: 5
- Distance: 735.9 km (457.3 mi)

Results
Jersey awarded to the overall winner	Winner	Tim Wellens (BEL)	(UAE Team Emirates)
	Second	Florian Vermeersch (BEL)	(Lotto–Dstny)
	Third	Yves Lampaert (BEL)	(Soudal–Quick-Step)
Jersey awarded to the points classification winner	Points	Arnaud De Lie (BEL)	(Lotto–Dstny)
Jersey awarded to the youth classification winner	Youth	Arnaud De Lie (BEL)	(Lotto–Dstny)
Jersey awarded to the combativity classification winner	Combativity	Aaron Van Poucke (BEL)	(Team Flanders–Baloise)
	Team	(United Arab Emirates) UAE Team Emirates	

The 2023 Renewi Tour was a road cycling stage race that took place from 23 to 27 August 2023 in Belgium and the Netherlands. It was the second edition of the rebranded Benelux Tour and the 18th edition overall.

== Teams ==
All eighteen UCI WorldTeams and four UCI ProTeams make up the twenty-two teams that will participate in the race.

UCI WorldTeams

- AG2R Citroën Team
- Alpecin–Deceuninck
- Arkéa–Samsic
- Astana Qazaqstan Team
- Bora–Hansgrohe
- Cofidis
- EF Education–EasyPost
- Groupama–FDJ
- Ineos Grenadiers
- Intermarché–Circus–Wanty
- Lidl–Trek
- Movistar Team
- Soudal–Quick-Step
- Team dsm–firmenich
- Team Bahrain Victorious
- Team Jayco–AlUla
- Team Jumbo–Visma
- UAE Team Emirates

UCI ProTeams

- Bingoal WB
- Israel–Premier Tech
- Lotto–Dstny
- Team Flanders–Baloise

== Route ==
Stage characteristics and winners
Stage	Date	Course	Distance	Type	Stage winner
1	23 August	(Belgium) Blankenberge to (Belgium) Ardooie	183.9 km (114.3 mi)	Flat stage	Jasper Philipsen (BEL)
2	24 August	(Netherlands) Sluis	13.6 km (8.5 mi)	Individual time trial	Josh Tarling (GBR)
3	25 August	(Belgium) Aalter to (Belgium) Geraardsbergen	171.5 km (106.6 mi)	Hilly stage	Mike Teunissen (NED)
4	26 August	(Belgium) Beringen to (Belgium) Peer	179.6 km (111.6 mi)	Flat stage	Sam Welsford (AUS)
5	27 August	(Belgium) Riemst to (Belgium) Bilzen	187.3 km (116.4 mi)	Hilly stage	Matej Mohorič (SLO)
Total			735.9 km (457.3 mi)		

== Stages ==
=== Stage 1 ===
23 August 2023 – Blankenberge to Ardooie, 183.9 km (114.3 mi)

Stage 1 Result
Rank	Rider	Team	Time
1	Jasper Philipsen (BEL)	Alpecin–Deceuninck	3h 51' 53"
2	Tim Merlier (BEL)	Soudal–Quick-Step	+ 0"
3	Olav Kooij (NED)	Team Jumbo–Visma	+ 0"
4	Arnaud De Lie (BEL)	Lotto–Dstny	+ 0"
5	Dylan Groenewegen (NED)	Team Jayco–AlUla	+ 0"
6	Matteo Trentin (ITA)	UAE Team Emirates	+ 0"
7	Laurence Pithie (NZL)	Groupama–FDJ	+ 0"
8	Arne Marit (BEL)	Intermarché–Circus–Wanty	+ 0"
9	Elia Viviani (ITA)	Ineos Grenadiers	+ 0"
10	Clément Russo (FRA)	Arkéa–Samsic	+ 0"

General classification after Stage 1
Rank	Rider	Team	Time
1	Jasper Philipsen (BEL)	Alpecin–Deceuninck	3h 51' 43"
2	Alessandro Covi (ITA)	UAE Team Emirates	+ 2"
3	Tim Merlier (BEL)	Soudal–Quick-Step	+ 4"
4	Jonas Rutsch (GER)	EF Education–EasyPost	+ 5"
5	Olav Kooij (NED)	Team Jumbo–Visma	+ 6"
6	Arnaud De Lie (BEL)	Lotto–Dstny	+ 10"
7	Dylan Groenewegen (NED)	Team Jayco–AlUla	+ 10"
8	Matteo Trentin (ITA)	UAE Team Emirates	+ 10"
9	Laurence Pithie (NZL)	Groupama–FDJ	+ 10"
10	Arne Marit (BEL)	Intermarché–Circus–Wanty	+ 10"

=== Stage 2 ===
24 August 2023 – Sluis, 13.6 km (8.5 mi) (ITT)

Stage 2 Result
Rank	Rider	Team	Time
1	Joshua Tarling (GBR)	Ineos Grenadiers	15' 05"
2	Tim Wellens (BEL)	UAE Team Emirates	+ 14"
3	Yves Lampaert (BEL)	Soudal–Quick-Step	+ 18"
4	Jasper Stuyven (BEL)	Lidl–Trek	+ 19"
5	Florian Vermeersch (BEL)	Lotto–Dstny	+ 21"
6	Kasper Asgreen (DEN)	Soudal–Quick-Step	+ 21"
7	Daan Hoole (NED)	Lidl–Trek	+ 23"
8	Mikkel Bjerg (DEN)	UAE Team Emirates	+ 24"
9	Tobias Foss (NOR)	Team Jumbo–Visma	+ 25"
10	Matej Mohorič (SLO)	Team Bahrain Victorious	+ 26"

General classification after Stage 2
Rank	Rider	Team	Time
1	Joshua Tarling (GBR)	Ineos Grenadiers	4h 06' 58"
2	Tim Wellens (BEL)	UAE Team Emirates	+ 14"
3	Yves Lampaert (BEL)	Soudal–Quick-Step	+ 18"
4	Jasper Stuyven (BEL)	Lidl–Trek	+ 19"
5	Kasper Asgreen (DEN)	Soudal–Quick-Step	+ 21"
6	Florian Vermeersch (BEL)	Lotto–Dstny	+ 21"
7	Daan Hoole (NED)	Lidl–Trek	+ 23"
8	Mikkel Bjerg (DEN)	UAE Team Emirates	+ 24"
9	Tobias Foss (NOR)	Team Jumbo–Visma	+ 25"
10	Matej Mohorič (SLO)	Team Bahrain Victorious	+ 26"

=== Stage 3 ===
25 August 2023 – Aalter to Geraardsbergen, 171.5 km (106.6 mi)

Stage 3 Result
Rank	Rider	Team	Time
1	Mike Teunissen (NED)	Intermarché–Circus–Wanty	3h 40' 17"
2	Tim Wellens (BEL)	UAE Team Emirates	+ 1"
3	Axel Zingle (FRA)	Cofidis	+ 2"
4	Marc Hirschi (SUI)	UAE Team Emirates	+ 4"
5	Arnaud De Lie (BEL)	Lotto–Dstny	+ 4"
6	Fred Wright (GBR)	Team Bahrain Victorious	+ 6"
7	Florian Vermeersch (BEL)	Lotto–Dstny	+ 8"
8	Matej Mohorič (SLO)	Team Bahrain Victorious	+ 8"
9	Yves Lampaert (BEL)	Soudal–Quick-Step	+ 8"
10	Jasper De Buyst (BEL)	Lotto–Dstny	+ 10"

General classification after Stage 3
Rank	Rider	Team	Time
1	Tim Wellens (BEL)	UAE Team Emirates	7h 47' 16"
2	Yves Lampaert (BEL)	Soudal–Quick-Step	+ 24"
3	Florian Vermeersch (BEL)	Lotto–Dstny	+ 26"
4	Jasper Stuyven (BEL)	Lidl–Trek	+ 30"
5	Fred Wright (GBR)	Team Bahrain Victorious	+ 30"
6	Marc Hirschi (SUI)	UAE Team Emirates	+ 31"
7	Matej Mohorič (SLO)	Team Bahrain Victorious	+ 33"
8	Mike Teunissen (NED)	Intermarché–Circus–Wanty	+ 34"
9	Axel Zingle (FRA)	Cofidis	+ 36"
10	Michał Kwiatkowski (POL)	Ineos Grenadiers	+ 38"

=== Stage 4 ===
26 August 2023 – Beringen to Peer, 179.6 km (111.6 mi)

Stage 4 Result
Rank	Rider	Team	Time
1	Sam Welsford (AUS)	Team dsm–firmenich	3h 57' 36"
2	Olav Kooij (NED)	Team Jumbo–Visma	+ 0"
3	Jasper Philipsen (BEL)	Alpecin–Deceuninck	+ 0"
4	Tim Merlier (BEL)	Soudal–Quick-Step	+ 0"
5	Arnaud De Lie (BEL)	Lotto–Dstny	+ 0"
6	Dylan Groenewegen (NED)	Team Jayco–AlUla	+ 0"
7	Max Kanter (GER)	Movistar Team	+ 0"
8	Milan Fretin (BEL)	Team Flanders–Baloise	+ 0"
9	Laurence Pithie (NZL)	Groupama–FDJ	+ 0"
10	Arne Marit (BEL)	Intermarché–Circus–Wanty	+ 0"

General classification after Stage 4
Rank	Rider	Team	Time
1	Tim Wellens (BEL)	UAE Team Emirates	11h 44' 52"
2	Florian Vermeersch (BEL)	Lotto–Dstny	+ 23"
3	Yves Lampaert (BEL)	Soudal–Quick-Step	+ 23"
4	Jasper Stuyven (BEL)	Lidl–Trek	+ 30"
5	Fred Wright (GBR)	Team Bahrain Victorious	+ 30"
6	Mike Teunissen (NED)	Intermarché–Circus–Wanty	+ 31"
7	Marc Hirschi (SUI)	UAE Team Emirates	+ 31"
8	Matej Mohorič (SLO)	Team Bahrain Victorious	+ 33"
9	Axel Zingle (FRA)	Cofidis	+ 34"
10	Matteo Trentin (ITA)	UAE Team Emirates	+ 36"

=== Stage 5 ===
27 August 2023 – Riemst to Bilzen, 187.3 km (116.4 mi)

Stage 5 Result
Rank	Rider	Team	Time
1	Matej Mohorič (SLO)	Team Bahrain Victorious	4h 07' 00"
2	Matteo Trentin (ITA)	UAE Team Emirates	+ 0"
3	Søren Kragh Andersen (DEN)	Alpecin–Deceuninck	+ 0"
4	Jasper De Buyst (BEL)	Lotto–Dstny	+ 0"
5	Arnaud De Lie (BEL)	Lotto–Dstny	+ 0"
6	Jasper Stuyven (BEL)	Lidl–Trek	+ 0"
7	Jasper Philipsen (BEL)	Alpecin–Deceuninck	+ 0"
8	Mike Teunissen (NED)	Intermarché–Circus–Wanty	+ 0"
9	Axel Zingle (FRA)	Cofidis	+ 0"
10	Yves Lampaert (BEL)	Soudal–Quick-Step	+ 0"

General classification after Stage 5
Rank	Rider	Team	Time
1	Tim Wellens (BEL)	UAE Team Emirates	15h 51' 52"
2	Florian Vermeersch (BEL)	Lotto–Dstny	+ 23"
3	Yves Lampaert (BEL)	Soudal–Quick-Step	+ 23"
4	Jasper Stuyven (BEL)	Lidl–Trek	+ 30"
5	Mike Teunissen (NED)	Intermarché–Circus–Wanty	+ 31"
6	Matej Mohorič (SLO)	Team Bahrain Victorious	+ 33"
7	Axel Zingle (FRA)	Cofidis	+ 34"
8	Matteo Trentin (ITA)	UAE Team Emirates	+ 36"
9	Marc Hirschi (SUI)	UAE Team Emirates	+ 38"
10	Søren Kragh Andersen (DEN)	Alpecin–Deceuninck	+ 40"

== Classification leadership table ==
Classification leadership by stage
Stage	Winner	General classification	Points classification	Combativity classification	Young rider classification	Team classification
1	Jasper Philipsen	Jasper Philipsen	Jasper Philipsen	Ludovic Robeet	Olav Kooij	Cofidis
2	Josh Tarling	Josh Tarling	Josh Tarling	Ludovic Robeet	Josh Tarling	Ineos Grenadiers
3	Mike Teunissen	Tim Wellens	Tim Wellens	Ludovic Robeet	Arnaud De Lie	UAE Team Emirates
4	Sam Welsford	Tim Wellens	Arnaud De Lie	Aaron Van Poucke	Arnaud De Lie	UAE Team Emirates
5	Matej Mohorič	Tim Wellens	Arnaud De Lie	Aaron Van Poucke	Arnaud De Lie	UAE Team Emirates
Final		Tim Wellens	Arnaud De Lie	Aaron Van Poucke	Arnaud De Lie	UAE Team Emirates

== Classification standings ==
Legend
Denotes the winner of the general classification	Denotes the winner of the combativity classification
Denotes the winner of the points classification	Denotes the winner of the young rider classification

=== General classification ===
Final general classification (1–10)
Rank	Rider	Team	Time
1	Tim Wellens (BEL)	UAE Team Emirates	15h 51' 52"
2	Florian Vermeersch (BEL)	Lotto–Dstny	+ 23"
3	Yves Lampaert (BEL)	Soudal–Quick-Step	+ 23"
4	Jasper Stuyven (BEL)	Lidl–Trek	+ 30"
5	Mike Teunissen (NED)	Intermarché–Circus–Wanty	+ 31"
6	Matej Mohorič (SLO)	Team Bahrain Victorious	+ 33"
7	Axel Zingle (FRA)	Cofidis	+ 34"
8	Matteo Trentin (ITA)	UAE Team Emirates	+ 36"
9	Marc Hirschi (SUI)	UAE Team Emirates	+ 38"
10	Søren Kragh Andersen (DEN)	Alpecin–Deceuninck	+ 40"

=== Points classification ===
Final points classification (1–10)
Rank	Rider	Team	Points
1	Arnaud De Lie (BEL)	Lotto–Dstny	70
2	Jasper Philipsen (BEL)	Alpecin–Deceuninck	65
3	Matej Mohorič (SLO)	Team Bahrain Victorious	52
4	Tim Wellens (BEL)	UAE Team Emirates	50
5	Olav Kooij (NED)	Team Jumbo–Visma	47
6	Tim Merlier (BEL)	Soudal–Quick-Step	44
7	Yves Lampaert (BEL)	Soudal–Quick-Step	43
8	Mike Teunissen (NED)	Intermarché–Circus–Wanty	42
9	Matteo Trentin (ITA)	UAE Team Emirates	40
10	Jasper Stuyven (BEL)	Lidl–Trek	34

=== Combativity classification ===
Final combativity classification (1–10)
Rank	Rider	Team	Points
1	Aaron Van Poucke (BEL)	Team Flanders–Baloise	39
2	Ceriel Desal (BEL)	Bingoal WB	33
3	Ludovic Robeet (BEL)	Bingoal WB	31
4	Senne Leysen (BEL)	Alpecin–Deceuninck	18
5	Andrey Amador (CRC)	EF Education–EasyPost	16
6	Derek Gee (CAN)	Israel–Premier Tech	12
7	Kamiel Bonneu (BEL)	Team Flanders–Baloise	16
8	Milan Fretin (BEL)	Team Flanders–Baloise	12
9	Cameron Wurf (AUS)	Ineos Grenadiers	11
10	Arne Marit (BEL)	Intermarché–Circus–Wanty	10

=== Young rider classification ===
Final young rider classification (1–10)
Rank	Rider	Team	Time
1	Arnaud De Lie (BEL)	Lotto–Dstny	15h 52' 56"
2	Nicolò Buratti (ITA)	Team Bahrain Victorious	+ 5' 41"
3	Dries De Pooter (BEL)	Intermarché–Circus–Wanty	+ 5' 42"
4	Thibau Nys (BEL)	Lidl–Trek	+ 6' 47"
5	Olav Kooij (NED)	Team Jumbo–Visma	+ 9' 34"
6	Casper van Uden (NED)	Team dsm–firmenich	+ 9' 36"
7	Ben Tulett (GBR)	Ineos Grenadiers	+ 11' 28"
8	Frederik Wandahl (DEN)	Bora–Hansgrohe	+ 12' 10"
9	Laurence Pithie (AUS)	Groupama–FDJ	+ 12' 42"
10	Milan Fretin (BEL)	Team Flanders–Baloise	+ 15' 54"

=== Team classification ===
Final team classification (1–10)
Rank	Team	Time
1	(United Arab Emirates) UAE Team Emirates	47h 36' 57"
2	(Belgium) Lotto–Dstny	+ 29"
3	(Belgium) Soudal–Quick-Step	+ 1' 39"
4	Team Bahrain Victorious	+ 1' 51"
5	(Belgium) Intermarché–Circus–Wanty	+ 1' 51"
6	(United States) EF Education–EasyPost	+ 2' 32"
7	(France) AG2R Citroën Team	+ 2' 55"
8	(United States) Lidl–Trek	+ 3' 42"
9	Israel–Premier Tech	+ 4' 46"
10	(United Kingdom) Ineos Grenadiers	+ 5' 59"
