= 2026 Renewi Tour =

2026 UCI World Tour, race 30 of 36

Race details
- Dates: 19–23 August 2026
- Stages: 5
- Distance: 917.7 km (570.2 mi)
- Winning time: 19h 28' 57"

Results
Jersey awarded to the overall winner	Winner	Jasper Philipsen (BEL)	(Alpecin–Premier Tech)
	Second	Jenno Berckmoes (BEL)	(Lotto–Intermarché)
	Third	Olav Kooij (NED)	(Decathlon CMA CGM)
Jersey awarded to the points classification winner	Points	Jasper Philipsen (BEL)	(Alpecin–Premier Tech)
Jersey awarded to the young rider classification winner	Young rider	Pietro Mattio (ITA)	(Visma–Lease a Bike)
Jersey awarded to the combativity classification winner	Combativity	Lionel Taminiaux (BEL)	(Lotto–Intermarché)
	Team	(Kazakhstan) XDS Astana Team	

The 2026 Renewi Tour was a road cycling stage race that took places in Belgium. It started on 19 August 2026 and finished on 23 August 2026. It was the 21st edition of the Renewi Tour.

== Teams ==
All eighteen UCI WorldTeams and four UCI ProTeams teams participated in the race.

UCI WorldTeams

- Alpecin–Premier Tech
- Decathlon CMA CGM
- EF Education–EasyPost
- Groupama–FDJ United
- Lidl–Trek
- Lotto–Intermarché
- Movistar Team
- Netcompany INEOS
- NSN Cycling Team
- Red Bull–Bora–Hansgrohe
- Soudal–Quick-Step
- Team Bahrain Victorious
- Team Jayco–AlUla
- Team Picnic–PostNL
- UAE Team Emirates XRG
- Uno-X Mobility
- Visma–Lease a Bike
- XDS Astana Team

UCI ProTeams

- Pinarello–Q36.5 Pro Cycling Team
- Tudor Pro Cycling Team
- Team Flanders–Baloise
- Unibet Rose Rockets

== Route ==
Stage characteristics and winners
Stage	Date	Course	Distance	Type	Stage winner
1	19 August	Diest to Diest	188.3 km (117.0 mi)	Flat stage	Jonathan Milan (ITA)
2	20 August	Blankenberge to Ardooie	173.9 km (108.1 mi)	Flat stage	Jasper Philipsen (BEL)
3	21 August	Celles to Geraardsbergen	184.6 km (114.7 mi)	Hilly stage	Jenno Berckmoes (BEL)
4	22 August	Riemst to Bilzen-Hoeselt	187.3 km (116.4 mi)	Hilly stage	Jasper Philipsen (BEL)
5	23 August	Leuven to Leuven	183.6 km (114.1 mi)	Flat stage	Jasper Philipsen (BEL)
Total			917.7 km (570.2 mi)		

== Stages ==
=== Stage 1 ===
19 August 2026 – Diest to Diest, 188.3 km (117.0 mi)

Stage 1 Result
Rank	Rider	Team	Time
1	Jonathan Milan (ITA)	Lidl–Trek	4h 04' 18"
2	Olav Kooij (NED)	Decathlon CMA CGM	+ 0"
3	Tim Merlier (BEL)	Soudal–Quick-Step	+ 0"
4	Jasper Philipsen (BEL)	Alpecin–Premier Tech	+ 0"
5	Sam Bennett (IRL)	Pinarello–Q36.5 Pro Cycling Team	+ 0"
6	Sam Welsford (AUS)	Netcompany INEOS	+ 0"
7	Pavel Bittner (CZE)	Team Picnic–PostNL	+ 0"
8	Dylan Groenewegen (NED)	Unibet Rose Rockets	+ 0"
9	Mike Teunissen (NED)	XDS Astana Team	+ 0"
10	Arnaud De Lie (BEL)	Lotto–Intermarché	+ 0"

General classification after Stage 1
Rank	Rider	Team	Time
1	Jonathan Milan (ITA)	Lidl–Trek	4h 04' 18"
2	Olav Kooij (NED)	Decathlon CMA CGM	+ 4"
3	Dries De Bondt (BEL)	Team Jayco–AlUla	+ 4"
4	Quinten Hermans (BEL)	Pinarello–Q36.5 Pro Cycling Team	+ 5"
5	Tim Merlier (BEL)	Soudal–Quick-Step	+ 6"
6	Timo Kielich (BEL)	Visma–Lease a Bike	+ 7"
7	Lionel Taminiaux (BEL)	Lotto–Intermarché	+ 8"
8	Carl-Frederik Bévort (DEN)	Uno-X Mobility	+ 8"
9	Jasper Philipsen (BEL)	Alpecin–Premier Tech	+ 10"
10	Sam Bennett (IRL)	Pinarello–Q36.5 Pro Cycling Team	+ 10"

=== Stage 2 ===
20 August 2026 – Blankenberge to Ardooie, 173.9 km (108.1 mi)

Stage 2 Result
Rank	Rider	Team	Time
1	Jasper Philipsen (BEL)	Alpecin–Premier Tech	3h 11' 27"
2	Joshua Giddings (GBR)	Lotto–Intermarché	+ 0"
3	Søren Wærenskjold (NOR)	Uno-X Mobility	+ 0"
4	Matteo Milan (ITA)	Groupama–FDJ United	+ 0"
5	Arvid de Kleijn (NED)	Tudor Pro Cycling Team	+ 0"
6	Arne Marit (BEL)	Red Bull–Bora–Hansgrohe	+ 0"
7	Žak Eržen (SLO)	Team Bahrain Victorious	+ 0"
8	Huub Artz (NED)	Lotto–Intermarché	+ 0"
9	Sam Bennett (IRL)	Pinarello–Q36.5 Pro Cycling Team	+ 0"
10	Tim Merlier (BEL)	Soudal–Quick-Step	+ 0"

General classification after Stage 2
Rank	Rider	Team	Time
1	Jasper Philipsen (BEL)	Alpecin–Premier Tech	7h 15' 35"
2	Olav Kooij (NED)	Decathlon CMA CGM	+ 4"
3	Dries De Bondt (BEL)	Team Jayco–AlUla	+ 4"
4	Quinten Hermans (BEL)	Pinarello–Q36.5 Pro Cycling Team	+ 5"
5	Tim Merlier (BEL)	Soudal–Quick-Step	+ 6"
6	Søren Wærenskjold (NOR)	Uno-X Mobility	+ 6"
7	Mike Teunissen (NED)	XDS Astana Team	+ 7"
8	Arnaud De Lie (BEL)	Lotto–Intermarché	+ 7"
9	Matteo Trentin (ITA)	Tudor Pro Cycling Team	+ 7"
10	Timo Kielich (BEL)	Visma–Lease a Bike	+ 7"

=== Stage 3 ===
21 August 2026 – Celles to Geraardsbergen, 184.6 km (114.7 mi)

Stage 3 Result
Rank	Rider	Team	Time
1	Jenno Berckmoes (BEL)	Lotto–Intermarché	4h 09' 11"
2	Jasper Philipsen (BEL)	Alpecin–Premier Tech	+ 3"
3	Olav Kooij (NED)	Decathlon CMA CGM	+ 3"
4	Arnaud De Lie (BEL)	Lotto–Intermarché	+ 3"
5	Robert Donaldson (GBR)	Team Jayco–AlUla	+ 6"
6	Quinten Hermans (BEL)	Pinarello–Q36.5 Pro Cycling Team	+ 6"
7	Mike Teunissen (NED)	XDS Astana Team	+ 6"
8	Filippo Fiorelli (ITA)	Visma–Lease a Bike	+ 8"
9	Pepijn Reinderink (NED)	Soudal–Quick-Step	+ 8"
10	Søren Wærenskjold (NOR)	Uno-X Mobility	+ 8"

General classification after Stage 3
Rank	Rider	Team	Time
1	Jenno Berckmoes (BEL)	Lotto–Intermarché	11h 24' 37"
2	Jasper Philipsen (BEL)	Alpecin–Premier Tech	+ 6"
3	Olav Kooij (NED)	Decathlon CMA CGM	+ 12"
4	Arnaud De Lie (BEL)	Lotto–Intermarché	+ 19"
5	Quinten Hermans (BEL)	Pinarello–Q36.5 Pro Cycling Team	+ 19"
6	Mike Teunissen (NED)	XDS Astana Team	+ 22"
7	Søren Wærenskjold (NOR)	Uno-X Mobility	+ 23"
8	Alec Segaert (BEL)	Team Bahrain Victorious	+ 23"
9	Matteo Trentin (ITA)	Tudor Pro Cycling Team	+ 24"
10	Robert Donaldson (GBR)	Team Jayco–AlUla	+ 25"

=== Stage 4 ===
22 August 2026 – Riemst to Bilzen-Hoeselt, 187.3 km (116.4 mi)

Stage 4 Result
Rank	Rider	Team	Time
1	Jasper Philipsen (BEL)	Alpecin–Premier Tech	3h 57' 45"
2	Olav Kooij (NED)	Decathlon CMA CGM	+ 0"
3	Alessandro Borgo (ITA)	Team Bahrain Victorious	+ 0"
4	Dylan Groenewegen (NED)	Unibet Rose Rockets	+ 0"
5	Luca Mozzato (ITA)	Tudor Pro Cycling Team	+ 0"
6	Marijn van den Berg (NED)	EF Education–EasyPost	+ 0"
7	Biniam Girmay (ERI)	NSN Cycling Team	+ 0"
8	Tim van Dijke (NED)	Red Bull–Bora–Hansgrohe	+ 0"
9	Sam Bennett (IRL)	Pinarello–Q36.5 Pro Cycling Team	+ 0"
10	Pavel Bittner (CZE)	Team Picnic–PostNL	+ 0"

General classification after Stage 4
Rank	Rider	Team	Time
1	Jasper Philipsen (BEL)	Alpecin–Premier Tech	15h 22' 18"
2	Jenno Berckmoes (BEL)	Lotto–Intermarché	+ 4"
3	Olav Kooij (NED)	Decathlon CMA CGM	+ 10"
4	Quinten Hermans (BEL)	Pinarello–Q36.5 Pro Cycling Team	+ 23"
5	Mike Teunissen (NED)	XDS Astana Team	+ 26"
6	Alec Segaert (BEL)	Team Bahrain Victorious	+ 27"
7	Søren Wærenskjold (NOR)	Uno-X Mobility	+ 27"
8	Matteo Trentin (ITA)	Tudor Pro Cycling Team	+ 28"
9	Robert Donaldson (GBR)	Team Jayco–AlUla	+ 29"
10	Filippo Fiorelli (ITA)	Visma–Lease a Bike	+ 30"

=== Stage 5 ===
23 August 2026 – Leuven to Leuven, 183.6 km (114.1 mi)

Stage 5 Result
Rank	Rider	Team	Time
1	Jasper Philipsen (BEL)	Alpecin–Premier Tech	4h 06' 49"
2	Luca Mozzato (ITA)	Tudor Pro Cycling Team	+ 0"
3	Mike Teunissen (NED)	XDS Astana Team	+ 0"
4	Filippo Fiorelli (ITA)	Visma–Lease a Bike	+ 0"
5	Alessandro Borgo (ITA)	Team Bahrain Victorious	+ 0"
6	Jenno Berckmoes (BEL)	Lotto–Intermarché	+ 0"
7	Marijn van den Berg (NED)	EF Education–EasyPost	+ 0"
8	Carl-Frederik Bévort (DEN)	Uno-X Mobility	+ 0"
9	Kim Heiduk (GER)	Netcompany INEOS	+ 0"
10	Toms Skujiņš (LAT)	Lidl–Trek	+ 0"

General classification after Stage 5
Rank	Rider	Team	Time
1	Jasper Philipsen (BEL)	Alpecin–Premier Tech	19h 28' 57"
2	Jenno Berckmoes (BEL)	Lotto–Intermarché	+ 14"
3	Olav Kooij (NED)	Decathlon CMA CGM	+ 20"
4	Mike Teunissen (NED)	XDS Astana Team	+ 32"
5	Quinten Hermans (BEL)	Pinarello–Q36.5 Pro Cycling Team	+ 33"
6	Alec Segaert (BEL)	Team Bahrain Victorious	+ 37"
7	Søren Wærenskjold (NOR)	Uno-X Mobility	+ 37"
8	Matteo Trentin (ITA)	Tudor Pro Cycling Team	+ 38"
9	Robert Donaldson (GBR)	Team Jayco–AlUla	+ 39"
10	Filippo Fiorelli (ITA)	Visma–Lease a Bike	+ 40"

== Classification leadership table ==
Classification leadership by stage
Stage	Winner	General classification	Points classification	Combativity classification	Young rider classification	Team classification
1	Jonathan Milan	Jonathan Milan	Jonathan Milan	Lionel Taminiaux	Vlad Van Mechelen	Team Bahrain Victorious
2	Jasper Philipsen	Jasper Philipsen	Jasper Philipsen	Lionel Taminiaux	Vlad Van Mechelen	Lotto–Intermarché
3	Jenno Berckmoes	Jenno Berckmoes	Jasper Philipsen	Lionel Taminiaux	Pietro Mattio	XDS Astana Team
4	Jasper Philipsen	Jasper Philipsen	Jasper Philipsen	Lionel Taminiaux	Pietro Mattio	XDS Astana Team
5	Jasper Philipsen	Jasper Philipsen	Jasper Philipsen	Lionel Taminiaux	Pietro Mattio	XDS Astana Team
Final		Jasper Philipsen	Jasper Philipsen	Lionel Taminiaux	Pietro Mattio	XDS Astana Team

== Classification standings ==
Legend
Denotes the winner of the general classification	Denotes the winner of the combativity classification
Denotes the winner of the points classification	Denotes the winner of the young rider classification

=== General classification ===
Final general classification (1–10)
Rank	Rider	Team	Time
1	Jasper Philipsen (BEL)	Alpecin–Premier Tech	19h 28' 57"
2	Jenno Berckmoes (BEL)	Lotto–Intermarché	+ 14"
3	Olav Kooij (NED)	Decathlon CMA CGM	+ 20"
4	Mike Teunissen (NED)	XDS Astana Team	+ 32"
5	Quinten Hermans (BEL)	Pinarello–Q36.5 Pro Cycling Team	+ 33"
6	Alec Segaert (BEL)	Team Bahrain Victorious	+ 37"
7	Søren Wærenskjold (NOR)	Uno-X Mobility	+ 37"
8	Matteo Trentin (ITA)	Tudor Pro Cycling Team	+ 38"
9	Robert Donaldson (GBR)	Team Jayco–AlUla	+ 39"
10	Filippo Fiorelli (ITA)	Visma–Lease a Bike	+ 40"

=== Points classification ===
Final points classification (1–10)
Rank	Rider	Team	Points
1	Jasper Philipsen (BEL)	Alpecin–Premier Tech	134
2	Olav Kooij (NED)	Decathlon CMA CGM	72
3	Mike Teunissen (NED)	XDS Astana Team	46
4	Jenno Berckmoes (BEL)	Lotto–Intermarché	45
5	Luca Mozzato (ITA)	Tudor Pro Cycling Team	42
6	Alessandro Borgo (ITA)	Team Bahrain Victorious	39
7	Sam Bennett (IRL)	Pinarello–Q36.5 Pro Cycling Team	39
8	Søren Wærenskjold (NOR)	Uno-X Mobility	32
9	Tim Merlier (BEL)	Soudal–Quick-Step	32
10	Filippo Fiorelli (ITA)	Visma–Lease a Bike	31

=== Combativity classification ===
Final combativity classification (1–10)
Rank	Rider	Team	Points
1	Lionel Taminiaux (BEL)	Lotto–Intermarché	59
2	Dries De Bondt (BEL)	Team Jayco–AlUla	41
3	Frederik Frison (BEL)	Pinarello–Q36.5 Pro Cycling Team	40
4	Edward Theuns (BEL)	Lidl–Trek	28
5	Michiel Lambrecht (BEL)	Team Flanders–Baloise	22
6	Johan Jacobs (SUI)	Groupama–FDJ United	20
7	Julius Johansen (DEN)	UAE Team Emirates XRG	18
8	Robert Stannard (AUS)	Team Bahrain Victorious	16
9	Toms Skujiņš (LAT)	Lidl–Trek	16
10	Carl-Frederik Bévort (DEN)	Uno-X Mobility	13

=== Young rider classification ===
Final young rider classification (1–8)
Rank	Rider	Team	Time
1	Pietro Mattio (ITA)	Visma–Lease a Bike	19h 29' 41"
2	Thibaud Gruel (FRA)	Groupama–FDJ United	+ 52"
3	Alessandro Borgo (ITA)	Team Bahrain Victorious	+ 2' 45"
4	Menno Huising (NED)	Visma–Lease a Bike	+ 10' 31"
5	Emil Herzog (GER)	Red Bull–Bora–Hansgrohe	+ 11' 08"
6	Storm Ingebrigtsen (NOR)	Uno-X Mobility	+ 21' 18"
7	Artem Shmidt (USA)	Netcompany INEOS	+ 25' 00"
8	Felix Ørn-Kristoff (NOR)	Lotto–Intermarché	+ 30' 23"

=== Team classification ===
Final team classification
Rank	Team	Time
1	(Kazakhstan) XDS Astana Team	58h 28' 58"
2	(Belgium) Team Flanders–Baloise	+ 5"
3	(Switzerland) Pinarello–Q36.5 Pro Cycling Team	+ 17"
4	(Netherlands) Visma–Lease a Bike	+ 27"
5	(France) Unibet Rose Rockets	+ 1' 44"
6	(France) Groupama–FDJ United	+ 2' 28"
7	(Norway) Uno-X Mobility	+ 2' 43"
8	Team Bahrain Victorious	+ 3' 03"
9	(United States) EF Education–EasyPost	+ 3' 21"
10	(Belgium) Alpecin–Premier Tech	+ 4' 04"
