= Benelux Tour =

Cycling stage race in Belgium and the Netherlands

- 2023 logo

Race details
- Date: August
- Region: Benelux
- Discipline: Road
- Competition: UCI World Tour
- Type: Stage race
- Race director: Jan Nys; Golazo
- Web site: renewitour.com

History
- First edition: 2005
- Editions: 21 (as of 2026)
- First winner: Bobby Julich (USA)
- Most wins: Tim Wellens (BEL) (4)
- Most recent: Jasper Philipsen (BEL)

The Benelux Tour (since 2023 known as the Renewi Tour for sponsorship reasons, and previously as the Eneco Tour and the BinckBank Tour) is a road bicycle racing stage race that is part of the UCI World Tour. The race was established in 2005 and was originally known as the Eneco Tour, named after the original sponsor. In 2017, the online discount broker BinckBank took over as the title sponsor, with the name of the race changing accordingly. In 2021, with the absence of a title sponsor, the race was known again as the Benelux Tour. The race was not held in 2022 due to conflicts with the racing calendar. In 2023, waste management company Renewi joined as a sponsor and renamed the race once again, this time to the Renewi Tour.

== History ==
The Tour of the Netherlands began on 6 May 1948, but only became an annual event in 1975. From about 2000 it was known as the Eneco Tour. The start of the UCI's ProTour in 2005 saw the faltering tour reorganised and reinvigorated. From 2017 to 2020, the race was known as the BinckBank Tour.

The Benelux Tour is a continuation of the faltering Tour of the Netherlands, which UCI president Hein Verbruggen deemed necessary for marketing reasons. The Dutch Tour organisation got a better sponsor (ENECO Energie). But because the race was not difficult enough, it could not be accepted into the new ProTour. At that point the organisation sought help from the organisation of the Tour of Belgium and the Tour de Luxembourg. They envisaged a Tour of the Benelux that would replace the three. This led to the Tour of Belgium as a co-organiser. The Tours of Belgium and Luxembourg however continued as such. The co-organisation or incorporation of the Tour de Luxembourg did not materialize, and since its inception the Benelux Tour has not crossed into Luxembourgish territory yet.

== Jerseys ==
The jersey colors for the classification leaders have changed several times over the years, mostly to reflect sponsor changes.

Jersey colors for classification leaders in the Benelux Tour
Year(s)	General	Points	Mountains	Young	Combativity
2005	Red jersey	Blue jersey	White jersey	Yellow jersey	No classification
2006	Red jersey	White jersey	No classification	Yellow jersey	No classification
2007	Red jersey	White jersey	No jersey	No classification	No classification
2008	White jersey	Red jersey	No jersey	No classification	No classification
2009	White jersey	Red jersey	No classification	No classification	No classification
2010–2011	White jersey	Red jersey	No classification	Green jersey	No classification
2012–2014	White jersey	Red jersey	No classification	No classification	Black jersey
2015–2016	White jersey	Red jersey	No classification	No classification	Green jersey
2017	Green jersey	Blue jersey	No classification	No classification	Black jersey
2018	Green jersey	Red jersey	No classification	No classification	Black jersey
2019–2020	Green jersey	Red jersey	No classification	No classification	White jersey
2021	Blue jersey	Cyan jersey	No classification	No classification	White jersey
2023–2026	Blue jersey	Cyan jersey	No classification	Red jersey	White jersey

== Winners ==
=== General classification ===
The winners since 2005 have been:

- 2005 : Bobby Julich (USA)
- 2006 : Stefan Schumacher (GER)
- 2007 : Iván Gutiérrez (ESP)
- 2008 : Iván Gutiérrez (ESP)
- 2009 : Edvald Boasson Hagen (NOR)
- 2010 : Tony Martin (GER)
- 2011 : Edvald Boasson Hagen (NOR)
- 2012 : Lars Boom (NED)
- 2013 : Zdeněk Štybar (CZE)
- 2014 : Tim Wellens (BEL)
- 2015 : Tim Wellens (BEL)
- 2016 : Niki Terpstra (NED)
- 2017 : Tom Dumoulin (NED)
- 2018 : Matej Mohorič (SLO)
- 2019 : Laurens De Plus (BEL)
- 2020 : Mathieu van der Poel (NED)
- 2021 : Sonny Colbrelli (ITA)
- 2023 : Tim Wellens (BEL)
- 2024 : Tim Wellens (BEL)
- 2025 : Arnaud De Lie (BEL)
- 2026 : Jasper Philipsen (BEL)

=== Points classification ===
The winners of the points classification were:

- 2005 : Allan Davis (AUS)
- 2006 : Simone Cadamuro (ITA)
- 2007 : Mark Cavendish (GBR)
- 2008 : Jürgen Roelandts (BEL)
- 2009 : Edvald Boasson Hagen (NOR)
- 2010 : Edvald Boasson Hagen (NOR)
- 2011 : Edvald Boasson Hagen (NOR)
- 2012 : Giacomo Nizzolo (ITA)
- 2013 : Lars Boom (NED)
- 2014 : Tom Dumoulin (NED)
- 2015 : André Greipel (GER)
- 2016 : Peter Sagan (SVK)
- 2017 : Peter Sagan (SVK)
- 2018 : Zdeněk Štybar (CZE)
- 2019 : Sam Bennett (IRL)
- 2020 : Mads Pedersen (DEN)
- 2021 : Danny van Poppel (NED)
- 2023 : Arnaud De Lie (BEL)
- 2024 : Jasper Philipsen (BEL)
- 2025 : Pavel Bittner (CZE)
- 2026 : Jasper Philipsen (BEL)

=== Mountains classification ===
There have only been mountains classifications in 2005, 2007 and 2008. The winners were:

- 2005 : Christian Vande Velde (USA)
- 2007 : Martin Pedersen (DEN)
- 2008 : Floris Goesinnen (NED)

=== Young rider classification ===
The young rider classification is open for cyclists under 25. The winners of the young rider classification were:

- 2005 : Thomas Dekker (NED)
- 2006 : Stefan Schumacher (GER)
- 2010 : Tony Martin (GER)
- 2011 : Edvald Boasson Hagen (NOR)
- 2023 : Arnaud De Lie (BEL)
- 2024 : Alec Segaert (BEL)
- 2025 : Tibor Del Grosso (NED)
- 2026 : Pietro Mattio (ITA)

=== Combativity classification ===
The winners of the combativity classification were:

- 2012 : Laurens De Vreese (BEL)
- 2013 : Laurens De Vreese (BEL)
- 2014 : Kenneth Vanbilsen (BEL)
- 2015 : Gijs Van Hoecke (BEL)
- 2016 : Bert Van Lerberghe (BEL)
- 2017 : Piet Allegaert (BEL)
- 2018 : Elmar Reinders (NED)
- 2019 : Baptiste Planckaert (BEL)
- 2020 : Kenneth Van Rooy (BEL)
- 2021 : Arjen Livyns (BEL)
- 2023 : Aaron Van Poucke (BEL)
- 2024 : Jordy Bouts (BEL)
- 2025 : Siebe Deweirdt (BEL)
- 2026 : Lionel Taminiaux (BEL)

=== Team classification ===
- 2005 : Liberty Seguros–Würth
- 2006 : Liquigas
- 2007 : Quick-Step–Innergetic
- 2008 : Team Columbia
- 2009 : Rabobank
- 2010 : Rabobank
- 2011 : Team RadioShack
- 2012 : Omega Pharma–Quick-Step
- 2013 : Omega Pharma–Quick-Step
- 2014 : Garmin–Sharp
- 2015 : Lotto–Soudal
- 2016 : Etixx–Quick-Step
- 2017 : Trek–Segafredo
- 2018 : Quick-Step Floors
- 2019 : Team Sunweb
- 2020 : Alpecin–Fenix
- 2021 : Team Bahrain Victorious
- 2023 : UAE Team Emirates
- 2024 : Visma–Lease a Bike
- 2025 : Alpecin–Deceuninck
- 2026 : XDS Astana Team

== Most stage wins ==
Last updated after the 2026 Renewi Tour:

Most stage wins in the Benelux Tour
Rank	Cyclist	# Stages	Stages
1	Tom Boonen (BEL)	7	2006: Stages 1 (Hoogeveen, Netherlands), 3 (Westmalle, Belgium) and 5 (Balen, Belgium); 2008: Stages 1 (Roermond, Netherlands) and 4 (Ardooie, Belgium); 2009: Stage 3 (Hasselt, Belgium); 2015: Stage 3 (Ardooie, Belgium)
1	André Greipel (GER)	7	2008: Stage 2 (Nieuwegein, Netherlands); 2010: Stages 2 (Ardooie, Belgium) and 6 (Heers, Belgium); 2011: Stages 1 (Sint Willebrord, Netherlands), 2 (Ardooie, Belgium); 2013: Stage 4 (Vlijmen, Netherlands); 2015: Stage 2 (Breda, Netherlands)
3	Jasper Philipsen (BEL)	6	2020: Stage 1 (Ardooie, Belgium); 2023: Stage 1 (Ardooie, Belgium); 2024: Stage 4 (Aalter, Belgium); 2026: Stages 2 (Diest, Belgium), 4 (Bilzen-Hoeselt, Belgium) and 5 (Leuven, Belgium)
4	Edvald Boasson Hagen (NOR)	5	2008: Stage 6 (Brussels, Belgium); 2009: Stages 6 (Roermond, Netherlands) and 7 (Amersfoort, Netherlands) (ITT); 2011: Stage 6 (Sittard, Netherlands); 2016: Stage 7 (Geraardsbergen, Belgium)
5	Peter Sagan (SVK)	4	2016: Stages 3 (Ardooie, Belgium) and 4 (Sint-Pieters-Leeuw, Belgium); 2017: Stages 1 (Venray, Netherlands) and 3 (Ardooie, Belgium)
5	Tim Wellens (BEL)	4	2014: Stage 6 (Aywaille, Belgium); 2015: Stage 6 (Houffalize, Belgium); 2017: Stage 6 (Houffalize, Belgium); 2019: Stage 4 (Houffalize, Belgium)
5	Tim Merlier (BEL)	4	2021: Stages 1 (Dokkum, Netherlands) and 4 (Ardooie, Belgium); 2025: Stages 1 (Breskens, Netherlands) and 4 (Bilzen-Hoeselt, Belgium)
8	Tyler Farrar (USA)	3	2009: Stages 1 (Ardooie, Belgium), 2 (Brussels, Belgium) and 4 (Libramont, Belgium)
8	Zdeněk Štybar (CZE)	3	2013: Stages 3 (Brouwersdam, Netherlands) and 7 (Geraardsbergen, Belgium); 2014: Stage 2 (Heusden, Netherlands)
8	Sam Bennett (IRL)	3	2019: Stages 1 (Hulst, Netherlands) and 2 (Ardooie, Belgium) and Stage 3 (Aalter, Belgium)
8	Jonathan Milan (ITA)	3	2024: Stages 1 (Bilzen, Belgium) and Stages 3 (Ardooie, Belgium); 2026: Stage 1 (Diest, Belgium)
12	Alessandro Ballan (ITA); Sylvain Chavanel (FRA); Arnaud De Lie (BEL); Philippe Gilbert (BEL); Marcel Kittel (GER); Robbie McEwen (AUS); Matej Mohorič (SLO); Manuel Quinziato (ITA); Svein Tuft (CAN); Mathieu van der Poel (NED); Max van Heeswijk (NED)	2	
23	56 riders	1	
