= 2024 Renewi Tour =

2024 UCI World Tour, race 30 of 35

Race details
- Dates: 28 August – 1 September 2024
- Stages: 5
- Distance: 745.5 km (463.2 mi)
- Winning time: 16h 03' 28"

Results
Jersey awarded to the overall winner	Winner	Tim Wellens (BEL)	(UAE Team Emirates)
	Second	Alec Segaert (BEL)	(Lotto–Dstny)
	Third	Per Strand Hagenes (NOR)	(Visma–Lease a Bike)
Jersey awarded to the points classification winner	Points	Jasper Philipsen (BEL)	(Alpecin–Deceuninck)
Jersey awarded to the youth classification winner	Youth	Alec Segaert (BEL)	(Lotto–Dstny)
Jersey awarded to the combativity classification winner	Combativity	Jordy Bouts (BEL)	(TDT–Unibet Cycling Team)
	Team	(Netherlands) Visma–Lease a Bike	

The 2024 Renewi Tour was a road cycling stage race that took place in Belgium and the Netherlands. It started on 28 August and finished on 1 September. It was the third edition of the rebranded Benelux Tour and the 19th edition overall.

== Teams ==
All eighteen UCI WorldTeams and five UCI ProTeams teams participated in the race.

UCI WorldTeams

- Alpecin–Deceuninck
- Arkéa–B&B Hotels
- Astana Qazaqstan Team
- Cofidis
- Decathlon–AG2R La Mondiale
- EF Education–EasyPost
- Groupama–FDJ
- Ineos Grenadiers
- Intermarché–Wanty
- Lidl–Trek
- Movistar Team
- Red Bull–Bora–Hansgrohe
- Soudal–Quick-Step
- Team Bahrain Victorious
- Team dsm–firmenich PostNL
- Team Jayco–AlUla
- UAE Team Emirates
- Visma–Lease a Bike

UCI ProTeams

- Bingoal WB
- Lotto–Dstny
- TDT–Unibet Cycling Team
- Team Flanders–Baloise
- Tudor Pro Cycling Team

== Route ==
Stage characteristics and winners
Stage	Date	Course	Distance	Type	Stage winner
1	28 August	(Belgium) Riemst to (Belgium) Bilzen	163.6 km (101.7 mi)	Hilly stage	Jonathan Milan (ITA)
2	29 August	(Belgium) Tessenderlo	15.4 km (9.6 mi)	Individual time trial	Alec Segaert (BEL)
3	30 August	(Belgium) Blankenberge to (Belgium) Ardooie	185.5 km (115.3 mi)	Flat stage	Jonathan Milan (ITA)
4	31 August	(Netherlands) Oostburg to (Belgium) Aalter	178.5 km (110.9 mi)	Flat stage	Jasper Philipsen (BEL)
5	1 September	(Belgium) Menen to (Belgium) Geraardsbergen	202.5 km (125.8 mi)	Hilly stage	Arnaud De Lie (BEL)
Total			745.5 km (463.2 mi)		

== Stages ==
=== Stage 1 ===
28 August 2024 – Riemst to Bilzen, 163.6 km (101.7 mi)

Stage 1 Result
Rank	Rider	Team	Time
1	Jonathan Milan (ITA)	Lidl–Trek	3h 41' 01"
2	Jasper Philipsen (BEL)	Alpecin–Deceuninck	+ 0"
3	Axel Zingle (FRA)	Cofidis	+ 0"
4	Dylan Groenewegen (NED)	Team Jayco–AlUla	+ 0"
5	Paul Penhoët (FRA)	Groupama–FDJ	+ 0"
6	Gerben Thijssen (BEL)	Intermarché–Wanty	+ 0"
7	Matteo Trentin (ITA)	Tudor Pro Cycling Team	+ 0"
8	Elia Viviani (ITA)	Ineos Grenadiers	+ 0"
9	Davide Bomboi (BEL)	TDT–Unibet Cycling Team	+ 0"
10	Iván García Cortina (ESP)	Movistar Team	+ 0"

General classification after Stage 1
Rank	Rider	Team	Time
1	Jonathan Milan (ITA)	Lidl–Trek	3h 40' 51"
2	Jasper Philipsen (BEL)	Alpecin–Deceuninck	+ 4"
3	Axel Huens (FRA)	TDT–Unibet Cycling Team	+ 4"
4	Axel Zingle (FRA)	Cofidis	+ 6"
5	Lars Craps (BEL)	Team Flanders–Baloise	+ 6"
6	Dylan Groenewegen (NED)	Team Jayco–AlUla	+ 10"
7	Paul Penhoët (FRA)	Groupama–FDJ	+ 10"
8	Gerben Thijssen (BEL)	Intermarché–Wanty	+ 10"
9	Matteo Trentin (ITA)	Tudor Pro Cycling Team	+ 10"
10	Elia Viviani (ITA)	Ineos Grenadiers	+ 10"

=== Stage 2 ===
29 August 2024 – Tessenderlo, 15.4 km (9.6 mi) (ITT)

Stage 2 Result
Rank	Rider	Team	Time
1	Alec Segaert (BEL)	Lotto–Dstny	16' 59"
2	Magnus Sheffield (USA)	Ineos Grenadiers	+ 7"
3	Stefan Bissegger (SUI)	EF Education–EasyPost	+ 10"
4	Tobias Foss (NOR)	Ineos Grenadiers	+ 11"
5	Tim Wellens (BEL)	UAE Team Emirates	+ 16"
6	Ben Turner (GBR)	Ineos Grenadiers	+ 22"
7	Christophe Laporte (FRA)	Visma–Lease a Bike	+ 23"
8	Filip Maciejuk (POL)	Red Bull–Bora–Hansgrohe	+ 26"
9	Maximilian Schachmann (GER)	Red Bull–Bora–Hansgrohe	+ 27"
10	Alberto Bettiol (ITA)	Astana Qazaqstan Team	+ 28"

General classification after Stage 2
Rank	Rider	Team	Time
1	Alec Segaert (BEL)	Lotto–Dstny	3h 58' 00"
2	Magnus Sheffield (USA)	Ineos Grenadiers	+ 7"
3	Tobias Foss (NOR)	Ineos Grenadiers	+ 11"
4	Tim Wellens (BEL)	UAE Team Emirates	+ 16"
5	Ben Turner (GBR)	Ineos Grenadiers	+ 22"
6	Christophe Laporte (FRA)	Visma–Lease a Bike	+ 23"
7	Maximilian Schachmann (GER)	Red Bull–Bora–Hansgrohe	+ 27"
8	Alberto Bettiol (ITA)	Astana Qazaqstan Team	+ 28"
9	Rémi Cavagna (FRA)	Movistar Team	+ 30"
10	Per Strand Hagenes (NOR)	Visma–Lease a Bike	+ 32"

=== Stage 3 ===
30 August 2024 – Blankenberge to Ardooie, 185.5 km (115.3 mi)

Stage 3 Result
Rank	Rider	Team	Time
1	Jonathan Milan (ITA)	Lidl–Trek	3h 57' 17"
2	Jasper Philipsen (BEL)	Alpecin–Deceuninck	+ 0"
3	Max Walscheid (GER)	Team Jayco–AlUla	+ 0"
4	Arnaud Démare (FRA)	Arkéa–B&B Hotels	+ 0"
5	Gleb Syritsa	Astana Qazaqstan Team	+ 0"
6	Jules Hesters (BEL)	Team Flanders–Baloise	+ 0"
7	Gerben Thijssen (BEL)	Intermarché–Wanty	+ 0"
8	Davide Persico (ITA)	Bingoal WB	+ 0"
9	Stefan Bissegger (SUI)	EF Education–EasyPost	+ 0"
10	Arnaud De Lie (BEL)	Lotto–Dstny	+ 0"

General classification after Stage 3
Rank	Rider	Team	Time
1	Alec Segaert (BEL)	Lotto–Dstny	7h 55' 17"
2	Magnus Sheffield (USA)	Ineos Grenadiers	+ 7"
3	Tobias Foss (NOR)	Ineos Grenadiers	+ 11"
4	Tim Wellens (BEL)	UAE Team Emirates	+ 16"
5	Ben Turner (GBR)	Ineos Grenadiers	+ 22"
6	Christophe Laporte (FRA)	Visma–Lease a Bike	+ 23"
7	Jonathan Milan (ITA)	Lidl–Trek	+ 23"
8	Maximilian Schachmann (GER)	Red Bull–Bora–Hansgrohe	+ 27"
9	Alberto Bettiol (ITA)	Astana Qazaqstan Team	+ 28"
10	Rémi Cavagna (FRA)	Movistar Team	+ 30"

=== Stage 4 ===
31 August 2024 – Oostburg to Aalter, 178.5 km (110.9 mi)

Stage 4 Result
Rank	Rider	Team	Time
1	Jasper Philipsen (BEL)	Alpecin–Deceuninck	3h 37' 08"
2	Christophe Laporte (FRA)	Visma–Lease a Bike	+ 0"
3	Arnaud De Lie (BEL)	Lotto–Dstny	+ 0"
4	Paul Penhoët (FRA)	Groupama–FDJ	+ 0"
5	Bram Welten (NED)	Team dsm–firmenich PostNL	+ 0"
6	Phil Bauhaus (GER)	Team Bahrain Victorious	+ 0"
7	Matteo Trentin (ITA)	Tudor Pro Cycling Team	+ 0"
8	Jonathan Milan (ITA)	Lidl–Trek	+ 0"
9	Milan Fretin (BEL)	Cofidis	+ 0"
10	Juan Sebastián Molano (COL)	UAE Team Emirates	+ 0"

General classification after Stage 4
Rank	Rider	Team	Time
1	Alec Segaert (BEL)	Lotto–Dstny	11h 32' 25"
2	Magnus Sheffield (USA)	Ineos Grenadiers	+ 7"
3	Tobias Foss (NOR)	Ineos Grenadiers	+ 11"
4	Tim Wellens (BEL)	UAE Team Emirates	+ 16"
5	Christophe Laporte (FRA)	Visma–Lease a Bike	+ 17"
6	Jasper Philipsen (BEL)	Alpecin–Deceuninck	+ 21"
7	Ben Turner (GBR)	Ineos Grenadiers	+ 22"
8	Jonathan Milan (ITA)	Lidl–Trek	+ 23"
9	Maximilian Schachmann (GER)	Red Bull–Bora–Hansgrohe	+ 27"
10	Alberto Bettiol (ITA)	Astana Qazaqstan Team	+ 28"

=== Stage 5 ===
1 September 2024 – Menen to Geraardsbergen, 202.5 km (125.8 mi)

Stage 5 Result
Rank	Rider	Team	Time
1	Arnaud De Lie (BEL)	Lotto–Dstny	4h 30' 56"
2	Tim Wellens (BEL)	UAE Team Emirates	+ 5"
3	Valentin Madouas (FRA)	Groupama–FDJ	+ 17"
4	Rick Pluimers (NED)	Tudor Pro Cycling Team	+ 20"
5	Stan Dewulf (BEL)	Decathlon–AG2R La Mondiale	+ 20"
6	Matej Mohorič (SLO)	Team Bahrain Victorious	+ 20"
7	Per Strand Hagenes (NOR)	Visma–Lease a Bike	+ 20"
8	Axel Zingle (FRA)	Cofidis	+ 39"
9	Christophe Laporte (FRA)	Visma–Lease a Bike	+ 41"
10	Paul Penhoët (FRA)	Groupama–FDJ	+ 43"

General classification after Stage 5
Rank	Rider	Team	Time
1	Tim Wellens (BEL)	UAE Team Emirates	16h 03' 28"
2	Alec Segaert (BEL)	Lotto–Dstny	+ 40"
3	Per Strand Hagenes (NOR)	Visma–Lease a Bike	+ 42"
4	Christophe Laporte (FRA)	Visma–Lease a Bike	+ 51"
5	Stan Dewulf (BEL)	Decathlon–AG2R La Mondiale	+ 55"
6	Jasper Philipsen (BEL)	Alpecin–Deceuninck	+ 57"
7	Ben Turner (GBR)	Ineos Grenadiers	+ 58"
8	Matej Mohorič (SLO)	Team Bahrain Victorious	+ 1' 01"
9	Maximilian Schachmann (GER)	Red Bull–Bora–Hansgrohe	+ 1' 03"
10	Alberto Bettiol (ITA)	Astana Qazaqstan Team	+ 1' 04"

== Classification leadership table ==
Classification leadership by stage
Stage	Winner	General classification	Points classification	Combativity classification	Young rider classification	Team classification
1	Jonathan Milan	Jonathan Milan	Jonathan Milan (Note: On stage 2, Jasper Philipsen, who was second in the points classification, wore the light blue jersey, because first-placed Jonathan Milan wore the blue jersey as the leader of the general classification.)	Jordy Bouts	Arnaud De Lie	Lidl–Trek
2	Alec Segaert	Alec Segaert	Alec Segaert (Note: On stage 3, Jonathan Milan, who was second in the points classification, wore the light blue jersey, because first-placed Alec Segaert wore the blue jersey as the leader of the general classification.)	Jordy Bouts	Alec Segaert (Note: On stage 3, Magnus Sheffield, who was second in the youth classification, wore the red jersey, because first-placed Alec Segaert wore the blue jersey as the leader of the general classification.)	Ineos Grenadiers
3	Jonathan Milan	Alec Segaert	Jonathan Milan	Jordy Bouts	Alec Segaert	Ineos Grenadiers
4	Jasper Philipsen	Alec Segaert	Jasper Philipsen	Jordy Bouts	Alec Segaert	Ineos Grenadiers
5	Arnaud De Lie	Tim Wellens	Jasper Philipsen	Jordy Bouts	Alec Segaert	Visma–Lease a Bike
Final		Tim Wellens	Jasper Philipsen	Jordy Bouts	Alec Segaert	Visma–Lease a Bike

== Classification standings ==
Legend
Denotes the winner of the general classification	Denotes the winner of the combativity classification
Denotes the winner of the points classification	Denotes the winner of the young rider classification

=== General classification ===
Final general classification (1–10)
Rank	Rider	Team	Time
1	Tim Wellens (BEL)	UAE Team Emirates	16h 03' 28"
2	Alec Segaert (BEL)	Lotto–Dstny	+ 40"
3	Per Strand Hagenes (NOR)	Visma–Lease a Bike	+ 42"
4	Christophe Laporte (FRA)	Visma–Lease a Bike	+ 51"
5	Stan Dewulf (BEL)	Decathlon–AG2R La Mondiale	+ 55"
6	Jasper Philipsen (BEL)	Alpecin–Deceuninck	+ 57"
7	Ben Turner (GBR)	Ineos Grenadiers	+ 58"
8	Matej Mohorič (SLO)	Team Bahrain Victorious	+ 1' 01"
9	Maximilian Schachmann (GER)	Red Bull–Bora–Hansgrohe	+ 1' 03"
10	Alberto Bettiol (ITA)	Astana Qazaqstan Team	+ 1' 04"

=== Points classification ===
Final points classification (1–10)
Rank	Rider	Team	Points
1	Jasper Philipsen (BEL)	Alpecin–Deceuninck	80
2	Arnaud De Lie (BEL)	Lotto–Dstny	62
3	Christophe Laporte (FRA)	Visma–Lease a Bike	49
4	Paul Penhoët (FRA)	Groupama–FDJ	46
5	Tim Wellens (BEL)	UAE Team Emirates	42
6	Axel Zingle (FRA)	Cofidis	34
7	Stefan Bissegger (SUI)	EF Education–EasyPost	33
8	Alec Segaert (BEL)	Lotto–Dstny	30
9	Matteo Trentin (ITA)	Tudor Pro Cycling Team	26
10	Magnus Sheffield (USA)	Ineos Grenadiers	25

=== Combativity classification ===
Final combativity classification (1–10)
Rank	Rider	Team	Points
1	Jordy Bouts (BEL)	TDT–Unibet Cycling Team	52
2	Axel Huens (FRA)	TDT–Unibet Cycling Team	26
3	Alex Colman (BEL)	Team Flanders–Baloise	16
4	Warre Vangheluwe (BEL)	Soudal–Quick-Step	13
5	Ward Vanhoof (BEL)	Team Flanders–Baloise	13
6	Jonas Rutsch (GER)	EF Education–EasyPost	12
7	Ceriel Desal (BEL)	Bingoal WB	12
8	Jan Maas (NED)	Team Jayco–AlUla	11
9	Matteo Trentin (ITA)	Tudor Pro Cycling Team	10
10	Tobias Foss (NOR)	Ineos Grenadiers	10

=== Young rider classification ===
Final young rider classification (1–8)
Rank	Rider	Team	Time
1	Alec Segaert (BEL)	Lotto–Dstny	16h 04' 08"
2	Per Strand Hagenes (NOR)	Visma–Lease a Bike	+ 2"
3	Eddy Le Huitouze (FRA)	Groupama–FDJ	+ 1' 00"
4	Dylan Vandenstorme (BEL)	Team Flanders–Baloise	+ 2' 04"
5	Arnaud De Lie (BEL)	Lotto–Dstny	+ 2' 13"
6	Iván Romeo (ESP)	Movistar Team	+ 4' 54"
7	Magnus Sheffield (USA)	Ineos Grenadiers	+ 11' 38"
8	Emil Herzog (GER)	Red Bull–Bora–Hansgrohe	+ 13' 14"

=== Team classification ===
Final team classification (1–10)
Rank	Team	Time
1	(Netherlands) Visma–Lease a Bike	48h 13' 16"
2	(France) Decathlon–AG2R La Mondiale	+ 1' 35"
3	(United States) EF Education–EasyPost	+ 1' 47"
4	(France) Groupama–FDJ	+ 1' 51"
5	(Belgium) Lotto–Dstny	+ 2' 23"
6	(Belgium) Team Flanders–Baloise	+ 3' 07"
7	(Germany) Red Bull–Bora–Hansgrohe	+ 5' 07"
8	Team Bahrain Victorious	+ 5' 53"
9	(Netherlands) TDT–Unibet Cycling Team	+ 7' 21"
10	(Belgium) Intermarché–Wanty	+ 8' 04"
