= 2022 ZLM Tour =

2022 UCI ProSeries

Race details
- Dates: 8–12 June
- Stages: 5
- Distance: 839 km (521.3 mi)
- Winning time: 18h 01' 39"

Results
Jersey awarded to the overall winner	Winner	Olav Kooij (NED)	(Team Jumbo–Visma)
	Second	Jakub Mareczko (ITA)	(Alpecin–Fenix)
	Third	Aaron Van Poucke (BEL)	(Sport Vlaanderen–Baloise)
Jersey awarded to the points classification winner	Points	Olav Kooij (NED)	(Team Jumbo–Visma)
Jersey awarded to the youth classification winner	Youth	Olav Kooij (NED)	(Team Jumbo–Visma)
	Team	Team Jumbo–Visma	

The 2022 ZLM Tour was the 33rd edition of the ZLM Tour cycling stage race. It started on 8 June in Kapelle and ended on 12 June in Rijsbergen and was part of the 2022 UCI ProSeries.

== Teams ==
Three UCI WorldTeams, five UCI ProTeams, nine UCI Continental teams and the Dutch national team made up the eighteen teams that participated in the race.

UCI WorldTeams

- Ineos Grenadiers
- Team Jumbo–Visma
- Team DSM

UCI ProTeams

- Alpecin–Fenix
- Bingoal Pauwels Sauces WB
- Burgos BH
- Human Powered Health
- Sport Vlaanderen–Baloise

UCI Continental Teams

- Abloc CT
- Allinq Continental Cycling Team
- BEAT Cycling
- Bike Aid
- EvoPro Racing
- Metec–Solarwatt p/b Mantel
- Riwal Cycling Team
- Tarteletto–Isorex
- VolkerWessels Cycling Team

National Teams

- Netherlands

== Route ==
Stage characteristics and winners
Stage	Date	Course	Distance	Type	Stage winner
1	8 June	Kapelle to Kapelle	102.5 km (63.7 mi)	Flat stage	Olav Kooij (NED)
2	9 June	Veere to Goes	183 km (113.7 mi)	Flat stage	Olav Kooij (NED)
3	10 June	Heythuysen to Buchten	192.5 km (119.6 mi)	Hilly stage	Jakub Mareczko (ITA)
4	11 June	Rucphen to Mierlo	199 km (123.7 mi)	Flat stage	Timothy Dupont (BEL)
5	12 June	Made to Rijsbergen	162 km (100.7 mi)	Flat stage	Olav Kooij (NED)
Total		839 km (521.3 mi)			

== Stages ==
=== Stage 1 ===
8 June 2022 – Kapelle to Kapelle, 102.5 km (63.7 mi)

Stage 1 Result
Rank	Rider	Team	Time
1	Olav Kooij (NED)	Team Jumbo–Visma	2h 08' 27"
2	Jakub Mareczko (ITA)	Alpecin–Fenix	+ 0"
3	Elia Viviani (ITA)	Ineos Grenadiers	+ 0"
4	Sam Welsford (AUS)	Team DSM	+ 0"
5	Arvid de Kleijn (NED)	Human Powered Health	+ 0"
6	Bram Welten (NED)	Netherlands	+ 0"
7	Alexander Salby (DEN)	Riwal Cycling Team	+ 0"
8	Daan van Sintmaartensdijk (NED)	VolkerWessels Cycling Team	+ 0"
9	Tim van Dijke (NED)	Team Jumbo–Visma	+ 0"
10	Joren Bloem (NED)	Abloc CT	+ 0"

General classification after Stage 1
Rank	Rider	Team	Time
1	Olav Kooij (NED)	Team Jumbo–Visma	2h 08' 17"
2	Jakub Mareczko (ITA)	Alpecin–Fenix	+ 4"
3	Aaron Van Poucke (BEL)	Sport Vlaanderen–Baloise	+ 5"
4	Elia Viviani (ITA)	Ineos Grenadiers	+ 6"
5	Arne Peters (NED)	Allinq Continental Cycling Team	+ 6"
6	Sam Welsford (AUS)	Team DSM	+ 7"
7	Ben Turner (GBR)	Ineos Grenadiers	+ 8"
8	Wesley Mol (NED)	Bike Aid	+ 8"
9	Tim van Dijke (NED)	Team Jumbo–Visma	+ 9"
10	Thijs de Lange (NED)	Metec–Solarwatt p/b Mantel	+ 9"

=== Stage 2 ===
9 June 2022 – Veere to Goes, 183 km (113.7 mi)

Stage 2 Result
Rank	Rider	Team	Time
1	Olav Kooij (NED)	Team Jumbo–Visma	3h 45' 38"
2	Elia Viviani (ITA)	Ineos Grenadiers	+ 0"
3	Aaron Van Poucke (BEL)	Sport Vlaanderen–Baloise	+ 0"
4	Arvid de Kleijn (NED)	Human Powered Health	+ 0"
5	Tomáš Kopecký (CZE)	Abloc CT	+ 0"
6	Karl Patrick Lauk (EST)	Bingoal Pauwels Sauces WB	+ 0"
7	Jan-Willem van Schip (NED)	BEAT Cycling	+ 0"
8	Ceriel Desal (BEL)	Bingoal Pauwels Sauces WB	+ 0"
9	Ben Turner (GBR)	Ineos Grenadiers	+ 0"
10	Mick van Dijke (NED)	Team Jumbo–Visma	+ 0"

General classification after Stage 2
Rank	Rider	Team	Time
1	Olav Kooij (NED)	Team Jumbo–Visma	5h 53' 43"
2	Elia Viviani (ITA)	Ineos Grenadiers	+ 9"
3	Aaron Van Poucke (BEL)	Sport Vlaanderen–Baloise	+ 12"
4	Jakub Mareczko (ITA)	Alpecin–Fenix	+ 16"
5	Karl Patrick Lauk (EST)	Bingoal Pauwels Sauces WB	+ 19"
6	Ben Turner (GBR)	Ineos Grenadiers	+ 20"
7	Thijs de Lange (NED)	Metec–Solarwatt p/b Mantel	+ 21"
8	Arvid de Kleijn (NED)	Human Powered Health	+ 22"
9	Tomáš Kopecký (CZE)	Abloc CT	+ 22"
10	Jan-Willem van Schip (NED)	BEAT Cycling	+ 22"

=== Stage 3 ===
10 June 2022 – Heythuysen to Buchten, 192.5 km (119.6 mi)

Stage 3 Result
Rank	Rider	Team	Time
1	Jakub Mareczko (ITA)	Alpecin–Fenix	4h 27' 36"
2	Olav Kooij (NED)	Team Jumbo–Visma	+ 0"
3	Alexander Salby (DEN)	Riwal Cycling Team	+ 0"
4	Elia Viviani (ITA)	Ineos Grenadiers	+ 0"
5	Milan Fretin (BEL)	Sport Vlaanderen–Baloise	+ 0"
6	Sam Welsford (AUS)	Team DSM	+ 0"
7	Mick van Dijke (NED)	Team Jumbo–Visma	+ 0"
8	Bram Welten (NED)	Netherlands	+ 0"
9	Arvid de Kleijn (NED)	Human Powered Health	+ 0"
10	Yoeri Havik (NED)	BEAT Cycling	+ 0"

General classification after Stage 3
Rank	Rider	Team	Time
1	Olav Kooij (NED)	Team Jumbo–Visma	10h 21' 13"
2	Jakub Mareczko (ITA)	Alpecin–Fenix	+ 12"
3	Elia Viviani (ITA)	Ineos Grenadiers	+ 15"
4	Aaron Van Poucke (BEL)	Sport Vlaanderen–Baloise	+ 18"
5	Karl Patrick Lauk (EST)	Bingoal Pauwels Sauces WB	+ 25"
6	Ben Turner (GBR)	Ineos Grenadiers	+ 26"
7	Mick van Dijke (NED)	Team Jumbo–Visma	+ 27"
8	Arvid de Kleijn (NED)	Human Powered Health	+ 28"
9	Jan-Willem van Schip (NED)	BEAT Cycling	+ 28"
10	Tomáš Kopecký (CZE)	Abloc CT	+ 28"

=== Stage 4 ===
11 June 2022 – Rucphen to Mierlo, 199 km (123.7 mi)

Stage 4 Result
Rank	Rider	Team	Time
1	Timothy Dupont (BEL)	Bingoal Pauwels Sauces WB	4h 12' 57"
2	Olav Kooij (NED)	Team Jumbo–Visma	+ 0"
3	Elia Viviani (ITA)	Ineos Grenadiers	+ 0"
4	Arvid de Kleijn (NED)	Human Powered Health	+ 0"
5	Alexander Salby (DEN)	Riwal Cycling Team	+ 0"
6	Jakub Mareczko (ITA)	Alpecin–Fenix	+ 0"
7	Bram Welten (NED)	Netherlands	+ 0"
8	Daan van Sintmaartendsijk (NED)	VolkerWessels Cycling Team	+ 0"
9	Raymond Kreder (NED)	Netherlands	+ 0"
10	Jesper Rasch (NED)	Abloc CT	+ 0"

General classification after Stage 4
Rank	Rider	Team	Time
1	Olav Kooij (NED)	Team Jumbo–Visma	14h 34' 04"
2	Elia Viviani (ITA)	Ineos Grenadiers	+ 17"
3	Jakub Mareczko (ITA)	Alpecin–Fenix	+ 18"
4	Aaron Van Poucke (BEL)	Sport Vlaanderen–Baloise	+ 24"
5	Karl Patrick Lauk (EST)	Bingoal Pauwels Sauces WB	+ 31"
6	Ben Turner (GBR)	Ineos Grenadiers	+ 32"
7	Mick van Dijke (NED)	Team Jumbo–Visma	+ 33"
8	Arvid de Kleijn (NED)	Human Powered Health	+ 34"
9	Jan-Willem van Schip (NED)	BEAT Cycling	+ 34"
10	Tomáš Kopecký (CZE)	Abloc CT	+ 34"

=== Stage 5 ===
12 June 2022 – Made to Rijsbergen, 162 km (100.7 mi)

Stage 5 Result
Rank	Rider	Team	Time
1	Olav Kooij (NED)	Team Jumbo–Visma	3h 27' 45"
2	Alexander Salby (DEN)	Riwal Cycling Team	+ 0"
3	Sam Welsford (AUS)	Team DSM	+ 0"
4	Timothy Dupont (BEL)	Bingoal Pauwels Sauces WB	+ 0"
5	Jakub Mareczko (ITA)	Alpecin–Fenix	+ 0"
6	Daan van Sintmaartendsijk (NED)	VolkerWessels Cycling Team	+ 0"
7	Yoeri Havik (NED)	BEAT Cycling	+ 0"
8	Jan-Willem van Schip (NED)	BEAT Cycling	+ 0"
9	Bram Welten (NED)	Netherlands	+ 0"
10	Magnus Sheffield (USA)	Ineos Grenadiers	+ 0"

General classification after Stage 5
Rank	Rider	Team	Time
1	Olav Kooij (NED)	Team Jumbo–Visma	18h 01' 39"
2	Jakub Mareczko (ITA)	Alpecin–Fenix	+ 28"
3	Aaron Van Poucke (BEL)	Sport Vlaanderen–Baloise	+ 34"
4	Karl Patrick Lauk (EST)	Bingoal Pauwels Sauces WB	+ 41"
5	Ben Turner (GBR)	Ineos Grenadiers	+ 42"
6	Mick van Dijke (NED)	Team Jumbo–Visma	+ 43"
7	Jan-Willem van Schip (NED)	BEAT Cycling	+ 44"
8	Tomáš Kopecký (CZE)	Abloc CT	+ 44"
9	Tosh Van der Sande (BEL)	Lotto–Soudal	+ 44"
10	Ceriel Desal (BEL)	Bingoal Pauwels Sauces WB	+ 44"

== Classification leadership table ==
Stage	Winner	General classification	Points classification	Young rider classification	Teams classification
1	Olav Kooij	Olav Kooij	Olav Kooij	Olav Kooij	Team DSM
2	Olav Kooij	Olav Kooij	Olav Kooij	Olav Kooij	Ineos Grenadiers
3	Jakub Mareczko	Olav Kooij	Olav Kooij	Olav Kooij	Team Jumbo–Visma
4	Timothy Dupont	Olav Kooij	Olav Kooij	Olav Kooij	Team Jumbo–Visma
5	Olav Kooij	Olav Kooij	Olav Kooij	Olav Kooij	Team Jumbo–Visma
Final		Olav Kooij	Olav Kooij	Olav Kooij	Team Jumbo–Visma

- On stage 2, Sam Welsford, who was second in the points classification, wore the blue jersey, because first placed Olav Kooij wore the yellow jersey as the leader of the general classification. On stage 3 and 4, Elia Viviani wore the blue jersey for the same reason.
- On stage 2, Tim van Dijke, who was second in the young rider classification, wore the white jersey, because first placed Olav Kooij wore the yellow jersey as the leader of the general classification. On stage 3, Tomáš Kopecký wore the blue jersey for the same reason. On stage 4, Mick van Dijke wore the white jersey for the same reason.

== Final classification standings ==
Legend
Denotes the leader of the general classification
Denotes the leader of the points classification
Denotes the leader of the young rider classification

=== General classification ===
Final general classification (1–10)
Rank	Rider	Team	Time
1	Olav Kooij (NED)	Team Jumbo–Visma	18h 01' 39"
2	Jakub Mareczko (ITA)	Alpecin–Fenix	+ 28"
3	Aaron Van Poucke (BEL)	Sport Vlaanderen–Baloise	+ 34"
4	Karl Patrick Lauk (EST)	Bingoal Pauwels Sauces WB	+ 41"
5	Ben Turner (GBR)	Ineos Grenadiers	+ 42"
6	Mick van Dijke (NED)	Team Jumbo–Visma	+ 43"
7	Jan-Willem van Schip (NED)	BEAT Cycling	+ 44"
8	Tomáš Kopecký (CZE)	Abloc CT	+ 44"
9	Tosh Van der Sande (BEL)	Team Jumbo–Visma	+ 44"
10	Cériel Desal (BEL)	Bingoal Pauwels Sauces WB	+ 44"

=== Points classification ===
Final points classification (1–10)
Rank	Rider	Team	Points
1	Olav Kooij (NED)	Team Jumbo–Visma	72
2	Elia Viviani (ITA)	Ineos Grenadiers	45
3	Jakub Mareczko (ITA)	Alpecin–Fenix	34
4	Alexander Salby (DEN)	Riwal Cycling Team	32
5	Sam Welsford (AUS)	Team DSM	28
6	Arvid de Kleijn (NED)	Human Powered Health	24
7	Timothy Dupont (BEL)	Bingoal Pauwels Sauces WB	23
8	Aaron Van Poucke (BEL)	Sport Vlaanderen–Baloise	19
9	Bram Welten (NED)	Netherlands	14
10	Daan van Sintmaartensdijk (NED)	VolkerWessels Cycling Team	11

=== Young rider classification ===
Final young rider classification (1–10)
Rank	Rider	Team	Time
1	Olav Kooij (NED)	Team Jumbo–Visma	18h 01' 39"
2	Mick van Dijke (NED)	Team Jumbo–Visma	+ 43"
3	Tomáš Kopecký (CZE)	Abloc CT	+ 44"
4	Roel van Sintmaartensdijk (NED)	VolkerWessels Cycling Team	+ 1' 54"
5	Milan Fretin (BEL)	Sport Vlaanderen–Baloise	+ 2' 00"
6	Magnus Sheffield (USA)	Ineos Grenadiers	+ 2' 00"
7	Michel Hessmann (GER)	Team Jumbo–Visma	+ 2' 02"
8	Tim van Dijke (NED)	Team Jumbo–Visma	+ 2' 15"
9	Axel van der Tuuk (NED)	Metec–Solarwatt p/b Mantel	+ 4' 14"
10	Pavel Bittner (CZE)	Team DSM	+ 4' 20"

=== Team classification ===
Final team classification (1–10)
Rank	Team	Time
1	Team Jumbo–Visma	54h 07' 09"
2	Bingoal Pauwels Sauces WB	+ 0"
3	Ineos Grenadiers	+ 1' 47"
4	BEAT Cycling	+ 2' 32"
5	Sport Vlaanderen–Baloise	+ 4' 19"
6	Team DSM	+ 4' 36"
7	Riwal Cycling Team	+ 4' 39"
8	Alpecin–Fenix	+ 4' 50"
9	Abloc CT	+ 5' 26"
10	Burgos BH	+ 6' 31"
