= 2024 Grand Prix de Denain =

French cycling race

2024 UCI ProSeries

Race details
- Dates: 14 March 2024
- Stages: 1
- Distance: 196.2 km (121.9 mi)
- Winning time: 4h 40' 31"

Results
	Winner	Jannik Steimle (GER)	(Q36.5 Pro Cycling Team)
	Second	Cériel Desal (BEL)	(Bingoal WB)
	Third	Dries Van Gestel (BEL)	(Team TotalEnergies)

The 2024 Grand Prix de Denain – Porte du Hainaut was the 65th edition of the Grand Prix de Denain one-day road cycling race. It was held on 14 March 2024 as a category 1.Pro race on the 2024 UCI ProSeries calendar.

== Teams ==
Nine of the 18 UCI WorldTeams, seven UCI ProTeams, and four UCI Continental teams made up the 20 teams that participated in the race. Three teams did not enter a full squad of seven riders, with Decathlon–AG2R La Mondiale, Team Jayco–AlUla and St. Michel–Mavic–Auber93 entering six riders. In total, 137 riders entered the race, of which 87 finished.

UCI WorldTeams

- Alpecin–Deceuninck
- Arkéa–B&B Hotels
- Cofidis
- Decathlon–AG2R La Mondiale
- Groupama–FDJ
- Intermarché–Wanty
- Soudal–Quick-Step
- Team Jayco–AlUla
- UAE Team Emirates

UCI ProTeams

- Bingoal WB
- Euskaltel–Euskadi
- Lotto–Dstny
- Q36.5 Pro Cycling Team
- TDT–Unibet Cycling Team
- Team Flanders–Baloise
- Team TotalEnergies

UCI Continental Teams

- CIC U Nantes Atlantique
- Nice Métropole Côte d'Azur
- St. Michel–Mavic–Auber93
- Van Rysel–Roubaix

== Result ==
Result (1–10)
Rank	Rider	Team	Time
1	Jannik Steimle (GER)	Q36.5 Pro Cycling Team	4h 40' 31"
2	Cériel Desal (BEL)	Bingoal WB	+ 0"
3	Dries Van Gestel (BEL)	Team TotalEnergies	+ 11"
4	Arnaud De Lie (BEL)	Lotto–Dstny	+ 11"
5	Hugo Page (FRA)	Intermarché–Wanty	+ 11"
6	Maxime Jarnet (FRA)	Van Rysel–Roubaix	+ 13"
7	Brent Van Moer (BEL)	Lotto–Dstny	+ 15"
8	Aimé De Gendt (BEL)	Cofidis	+ 1' 06"
9	Simon Dehairs (BEL)	Alpecin–Deceuninck	+ 1' 09"
10	Amaury Capiot (BEL)	Arkéa–B&B Hotels	+ 1' 09"
