= Swatt Club =

Italian cycling team

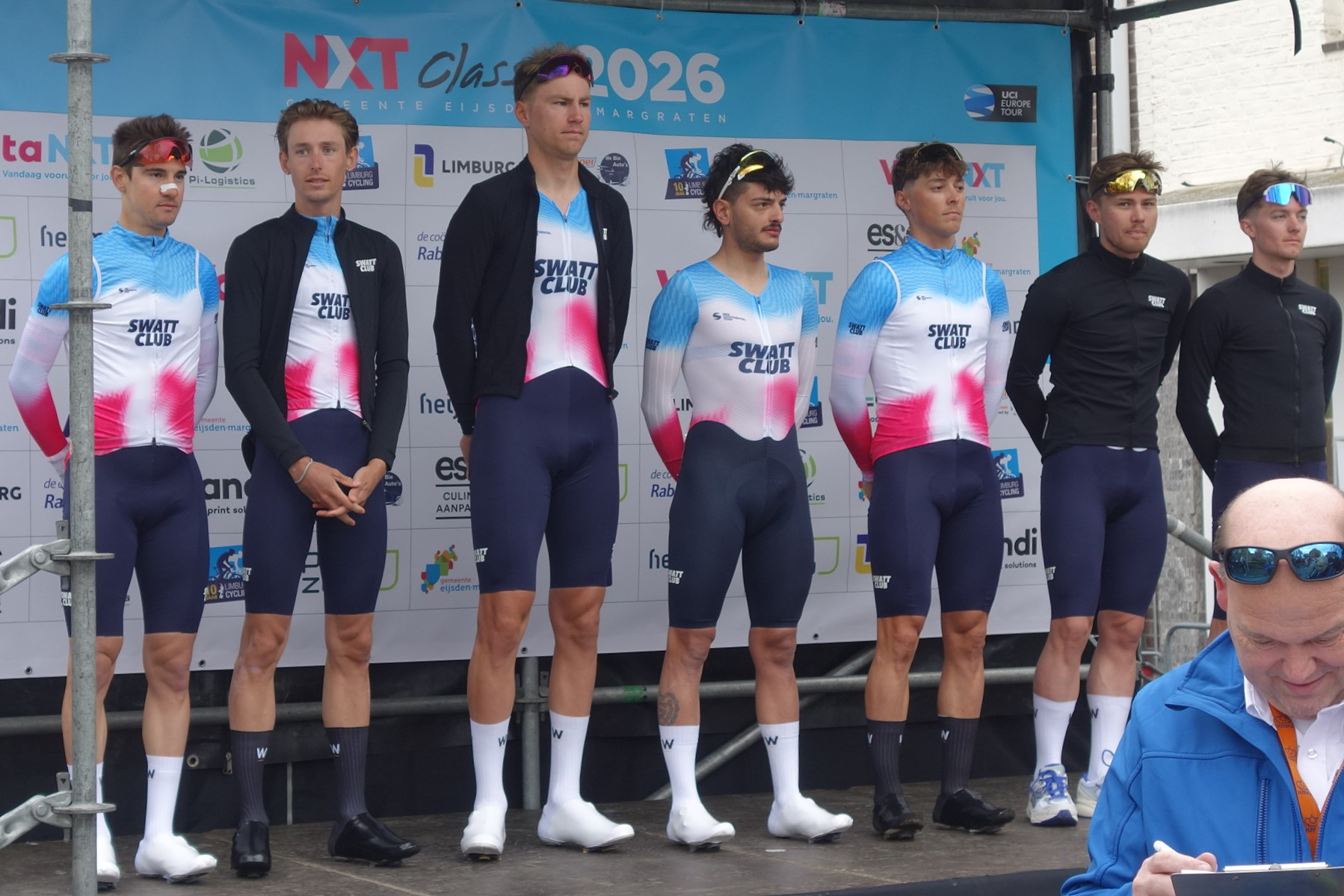
- The team at the 2026 Volta NXT Classic

Team information
- UCI code: SWT
- Registered: Italy
- Founded: 2017
- Disciplines: Road; Gravel
- Status: National (2017–2025); UCI Continental (2026–)
- Bicycles: Giant
- Components: Shimano

Key personnel
- General manager: Giorgio Brambilla
- Team manager: Carlo Beretta

Team name history
- 2017–: Swatt Club

Swatt Club is an Italian UCI Continental cycling team that competes in road and gravel races. The team competed domestically before gaining UCI status in 2026. Filippo Conca notably won the Italian National Road Race Championships in 2025 while riding for the team.

Carlo Beretta started the club in 2013, initially as a blog known as "SoloWattaggio" focusing on alpine skiing. Around 2017, the group created an amateur cycling club, known for their plain white uniforms. In 2025, the team began competing at a higher level, signing riders such as Filippo Conca, Mattia Gaffuri, Jordy Bouts and Sebastian Schönberger, all of whom had previously or went on to compete at a fully pro level.

In addition to the elite team, the amateur club has over 1,100 members, which riders can pay to be part of.
