= Jordy Bouts =

Belgian racing cyclist (born 1996)

Personal information
- Full name: Jordy Bouts
- Born: 8 August 1996 (age 30) Mechelen, Belgium
- Height: 1.74 m (5 ft 9 in)
- Weight: 62 kg (137 lb)

Cycling career
- Sport: Cycling
- Current team: The Grip
- Disciplines: Road; Gravel
- Role: Rider

Amateur teams
- 2015–2017: Prorace Cycling Team
- 2018–2019: EFC-L&R-Vulsteke

Professional teams
- 2020: Tarteletto–Isorex
- 2021–2022: BEAT Cycling
- 2023–2024: TDT–Unibet
- 2025: Swatt Club
- 2026–: The Grip

Jordy Bouts (born 8 August 1996) is a Belgian racing cyclist, who currently competes in gravel racing for the elite team The Grip. He previously raced professionally on the road for UCI Continental teams Tarteletto–Isorex and BEAT Cycling, and UCI ProTeam TDT–Unibet.

== Career ==
Bouts was born in Mechelen and began his athletic career in BMX racing before transitioning to road cycling. He spent his early amateur years riding for the Prorace Cycling Team and EFC-L&R-Vulsteke. During his U23 years, he placed third at Bruxelles-Opwijk in 2018, and finished second overall at the 2019 Tour de la Mirabelle.

In 2020, Bouts turned professional by signing with the Belgian UCI Continental team Tarteletto–Isorex, though his debut season was heavily impacted by the COVID-19 pandemic. He then moved to the Dutch outfit BEAT Cycling for the 2021 and 2022 seasons. Ahead of the 2023 season, he joined the newly formed TDT–Unibet squad, which upgraded to UCI ProTeam status in 2024.

During the 2024 season, Bouts received significant media coverage in the cycling press following a severe diagnosis of myocarditis (heart muscle inflammation), which sidelined him for months. After passing cardiological clearances, he made a notable return to the peloton at the WorldTour-level Renewi Tour, where he successfully broke away on stage one and ultimately won the race's overall Super 8 combativity classification. Despite this achievement, TDT-Unibet chose not to renew his contract at the end of the year.

Following his departure from road racing, Bouts shifted his focus to competitive gravel racing in 2025, joining Swatt Club and establishing his own cycling coaching business. During the year, he won the Utopia Gravel Fest and placed 14th at Unbound Gravel. In 2026, he signed with The Grip, a new elite gravel racing project managed by former professional Mattia De Marchi and co-sponsored by Wilier Triestina.

== Major results ==
=== Road ===
2018
3rd Bruxelles-Opwijk
2019
2nd Overall Tour de la Mirabelle
7th Grand Prix des Marbriers
2024
1st Combativity classification, Renewi Tour

=== Gravel ===
2025
1st Utopia Gravel Fest
