= Bob Donaldson (cyclist) =

British cyclist (born 2002)

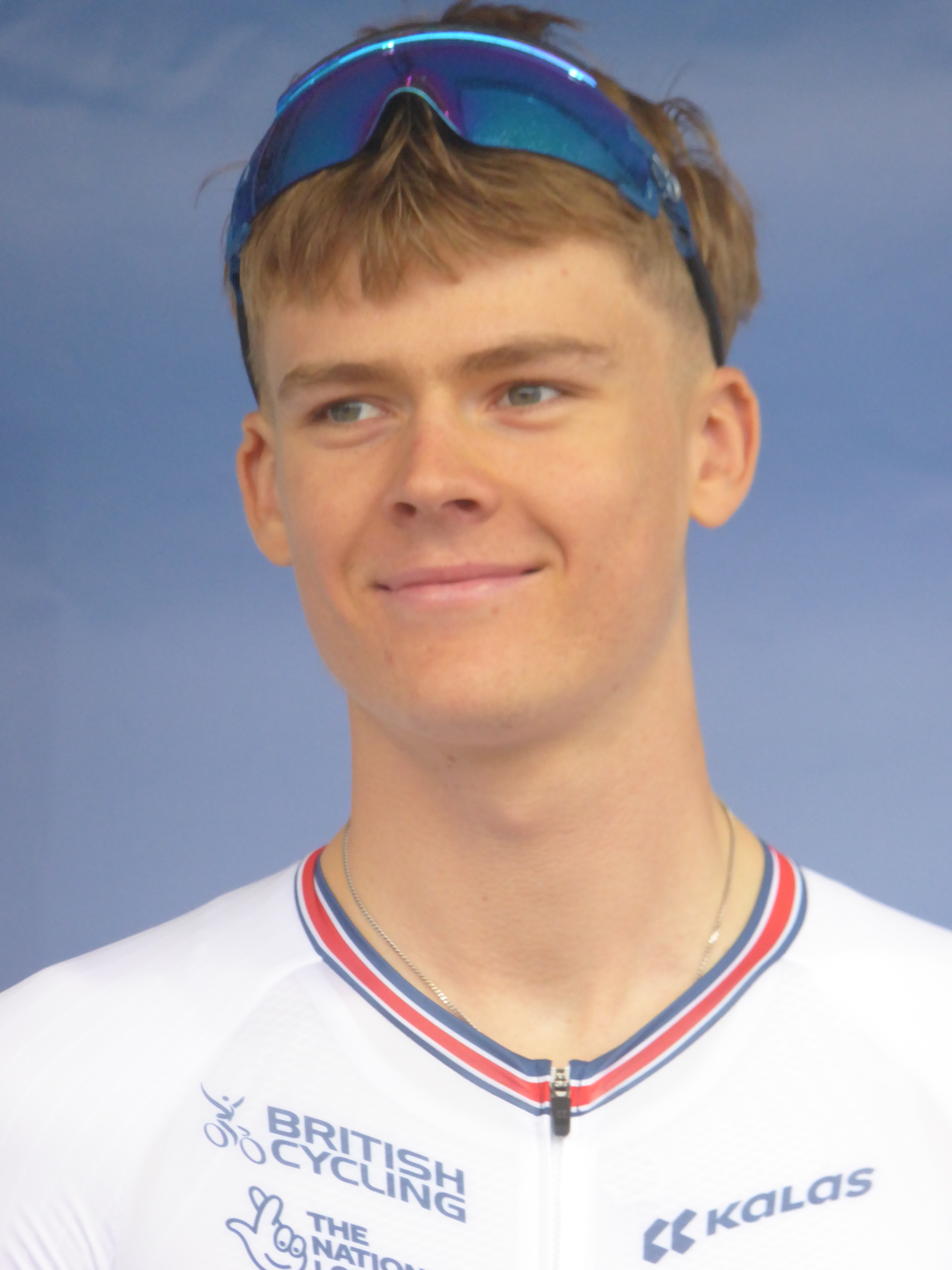
- Donaldson in 2023

Personal information
- Full name: Robert Donaldson
- Born: 8 April 2002 (age 24) Manchester, England
- Height: 1.89 m (6 ft 2 in)

Cycling career
- Sport: Cycling
- Current team: Team Jayco–AlUla
- Discipline: Road
- Role: Rider

Amateur teams
- 2019–2020: Fensham Howes–MAS Design
- 2021–2022: GB Cycling Senior Academy

Professional teams
- 2023–2024: Trinity Racing
- 2025–: Team Jayco–AlUla

Robert Donaldson (born 8 April 2002) is a British cyclist, who currently rides for UCI WorldTeam Team Jayco–AlUla.

== Career ==
=== 2021 ===
In 2021, he was selected the Great Britain team for the Tour de l'Avenir. The following month, he was selected as part of the British team for the U23 road race at the UCI Cycling World Championships in Flanders.

=== 2022 ===
In 2022, he was selected as part of the Great Britain team for the Tour de l'Avenir. Donaldson finished fourth in the general classification of Tour d'Eure-et-Loir in 2022. He missed the start of the 2023 season after being hit by a car and suffering a broken transverse process on four lumbar vertebrae following a training ride in the Peak District.

=== 2023 ===
He joined Trinity Racing for the 2023 season. In June 2023, he won the Otley Grand Prix in Yorkshire for Trinity Racing with a solo breakaway. In May 2023, he won stage four of the Orlen Nations Grand Prix. He was selected for the U23 road race and time trial at the 2023 UCI Cycling World Championships in Glasgow.

=== 2024 ===
In April 2024, he finished runner-up at the Paris–Roubaix Espoirs. In June 2024, he won the British U23 Road Race title in Yorkshire.

== Major results ==
2019
1st Overall La Coupe du President de la Ville de Grudziądz

1st Points classification
1st Young rider classification

2nd Trofee van Vlaanderen
10th Guido Reybrouck Classic
2020
9th Kuurne–Brussels–Kuurne Junioren
2022
4th Overall Tour d'Eure-et-Loir

1st Young rider classification

7th PWZ Zuidenveld Tour
7th Gent–Wevelgem Beloften
9th Rutland–Melton CiCLE Classic
2023
1st Otley Grand Prix
1st Stage 4 Orlen Nations Grand Prix
2024
1st Road race, National Under-23 Road Championships
2nd Paris–Roubaix Espoirs
2026
2nd Philadelphia Cycling Classic
4th Hong Kong Cyclothon
5th Gent–Wevelgem
7th Clàssica Comunitat Valenciana 1969
9th Overall Renewi Tour
