= Pietro Mattio =

Italian cyclist

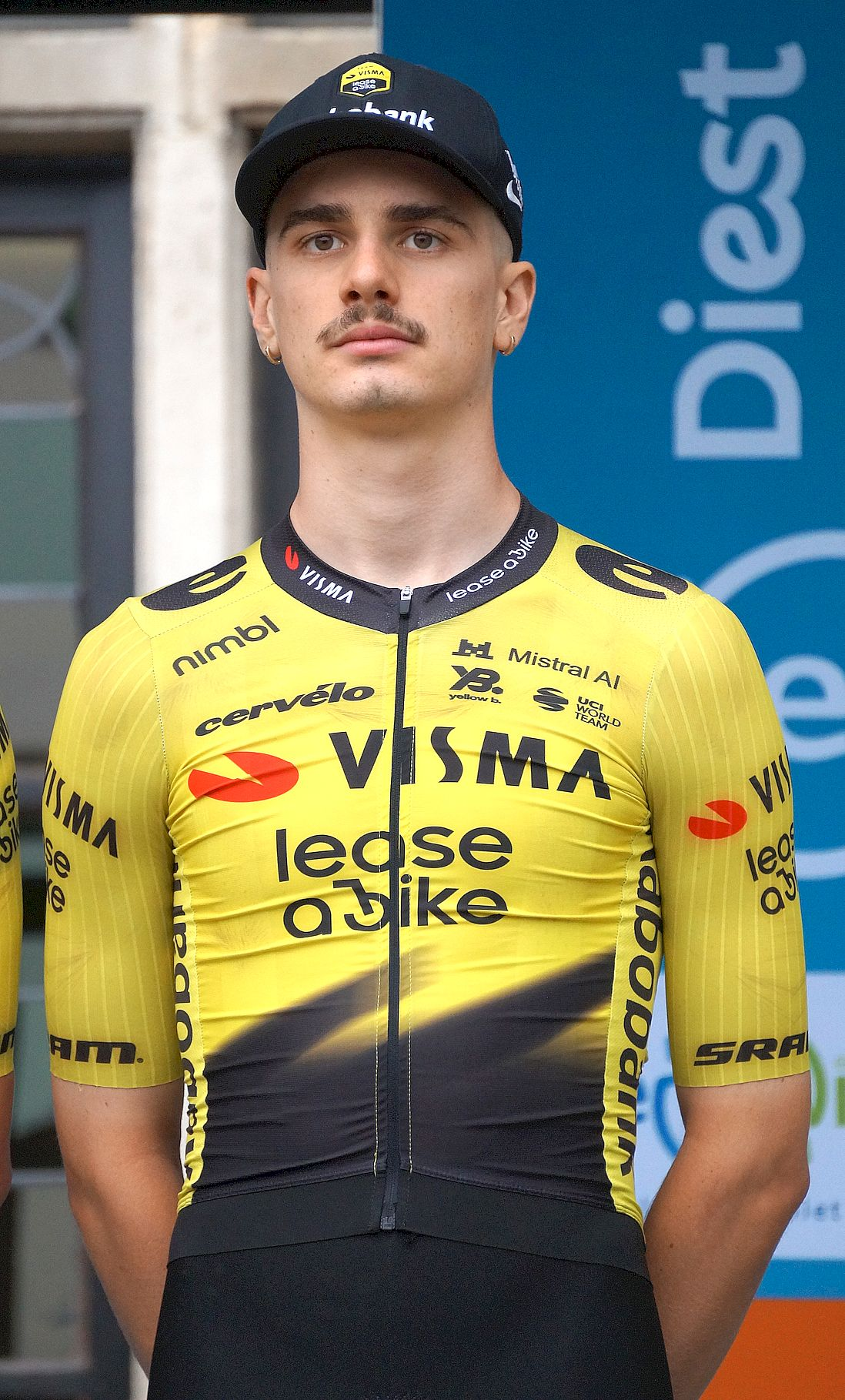

Personal information
- Born: 27 June 2004 (age 22) Cuneo, Italy
- Height: 1.84 m (6 ft 0 in)
- Weight: 70 kg (154 lb)

Cycling career
- Sport: Cycling
- Current team: Visma–Lease a Bike
- Discipline: Road
- Role: Rider

Amateur team
- 2021–2022: Vigor Cycling Team

Professional teams
- 2023–2025: Jumbo–Visma Development Team
- 2026–: Visma–Lease a Bike

Pietro Mattio (born 27 June 2004) is an Italian racing cyclist, who currently rides for UCI WorldTeam Visma–Lease a Bike.

== Major results ==
2021
4th La Classique des Alpes Juniors
6th Trofeo Buffoni
2022
7th Giro di Primavera
2024
1st Mountains classification, Orlen Nations Grand Prix
3rd Road race, National Under-23 Road Championships
5th Overall Istrian Spring Trophy
9th Piccolo Giro di Lombardia
2025
5th Paris–Roubaix Espoirs
6th Overall Alpes Isère Tour
2026
1st Young rider classification, Renewi Tour
