= Rijsbergen =

- Town
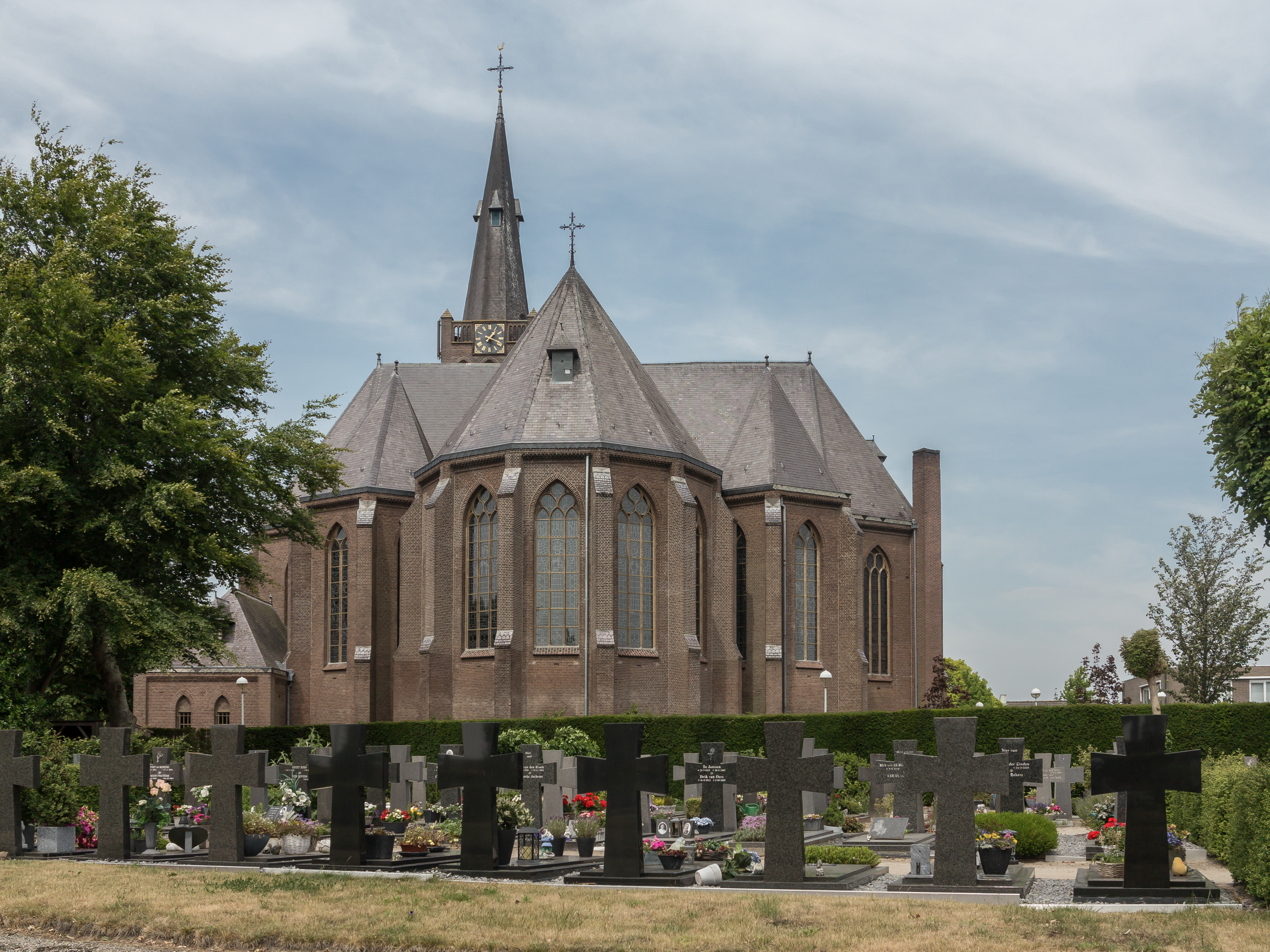
- St Bavo Church

- Location in the province of North Brabant in the Netherlands Rijsbergen (Netherlands)
- Coordinates: 51°31′1″N 4°41′46″E
- Country: Netherlands
- Province: North Brabant
- Municipality: Zundert

Area
  - Total: 35.36 km^{2} (13.65 sq mi)
- Elevation: 8 m (26 ft)

Population (2025)
  - Total: 6,945
  - Density: 196.4/km^{2} (508.7/sq mi)
- Time zone: UTC+1 (CET)
  - Summer (DST): UTC+2 (CEST)
- Postal code: 4891
- Dialing code: 076

Rijsbergen a town in the municipality of Zundert in the southern Netherlands.

In the town used to be an AC (Aanmeldcentrum, i.e. Asylum Request Center).

Until 1997 Rijsbergen was an independent municipality, after which it was added to Zundert.

== History ==
The first mentioning of Rijsbergen is in 1159. Werner of Rijsbergen then gives his land to the Tongerlo Abbey. In 1812, there were remains found of a small Roman temple out the 2nd-3rd century.

Rijsbergen was always part of land Breda. Together with Zundert they formed "Zundert-Nassau".

In 1810, Rijsbergen became an independent municipality.

On 28 October, 1944 Rijsbergen got freed from the Germans.

== Landmarks ==
The skyline of Rijsbergen is dominated by the neo-Gothic Roman Catholic church of Saint Bavo, which was built in 1918 as a replacement of a smaller fourteenth-century church. The church is in the town centre and is flanked by the former town hall, which has been transformed into a museum. Furthermore, in the outskirts of Rijsbergen a successful Garden Centre can be found named: "De Bosrand". It is and loved by many locals.

The countryside around Rijsbergen is dotted with eleven shrines devoted to the Virgin Mary. They were built after the Second World War as a thanksgiving for surviving the war relatively undamaged.

== Demographics ==
As demonstrated in this table below, the biggest age group of Rijsbergen are middle-aged adults (aged 45-65).

Age distribution of Rijsbergen
Age group	Population	Percentage
0-15	930	13.4%
15-25	715	10.3%
25-45	1535	22.1%
45-65	1990	28.7%
65+	1770	25.5%

90,6% of residents are born inside the Netherlands, 9,4% are foreign-born residents.

44,3% of foreign-born residents are born outside of Europe, 55,7% are born inside of Europe.

== Transportation ==
Bus 374 connects Rijsbergen with Zundert, Breda and Made. Bus 225 connects Rijsbergen with Zundert and Etten-Leur.

== Education ==
There is the Sint Bavoschool, an elementary school. Outside the village, there is also De Koperakker, a special education elementary school.

== Gallery ==
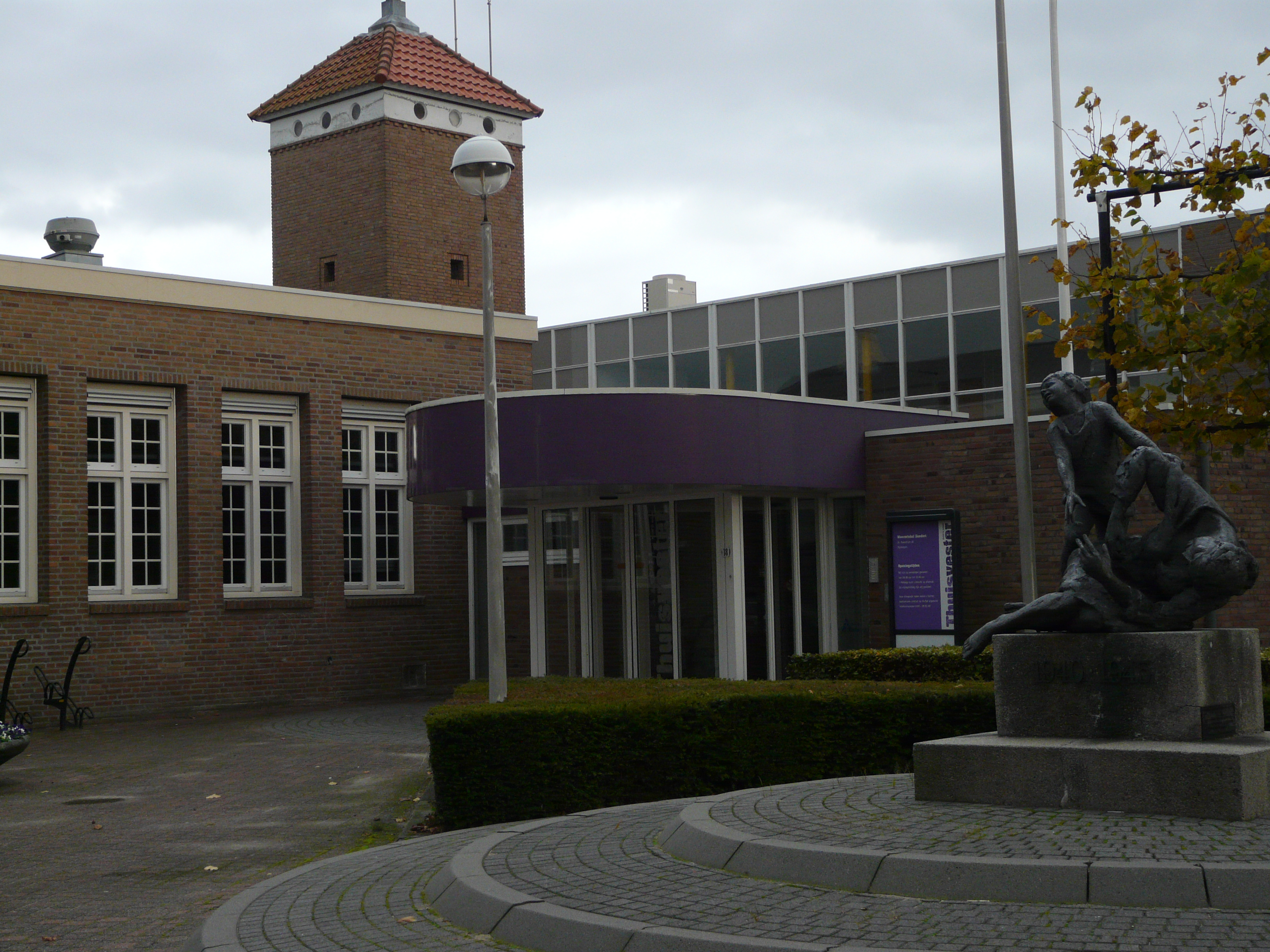
Building in Rijsbergen

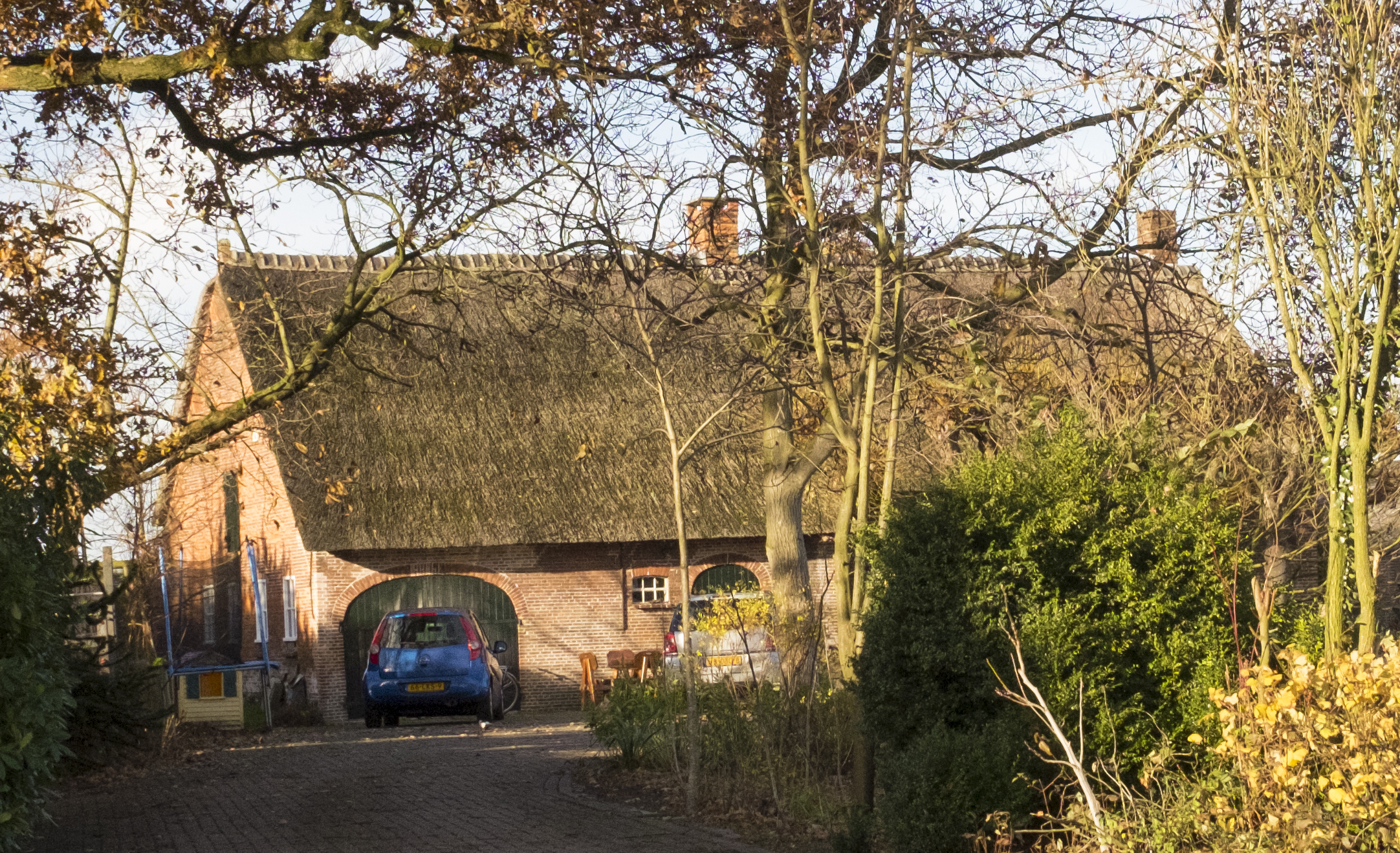
Farm in Rijsbergen

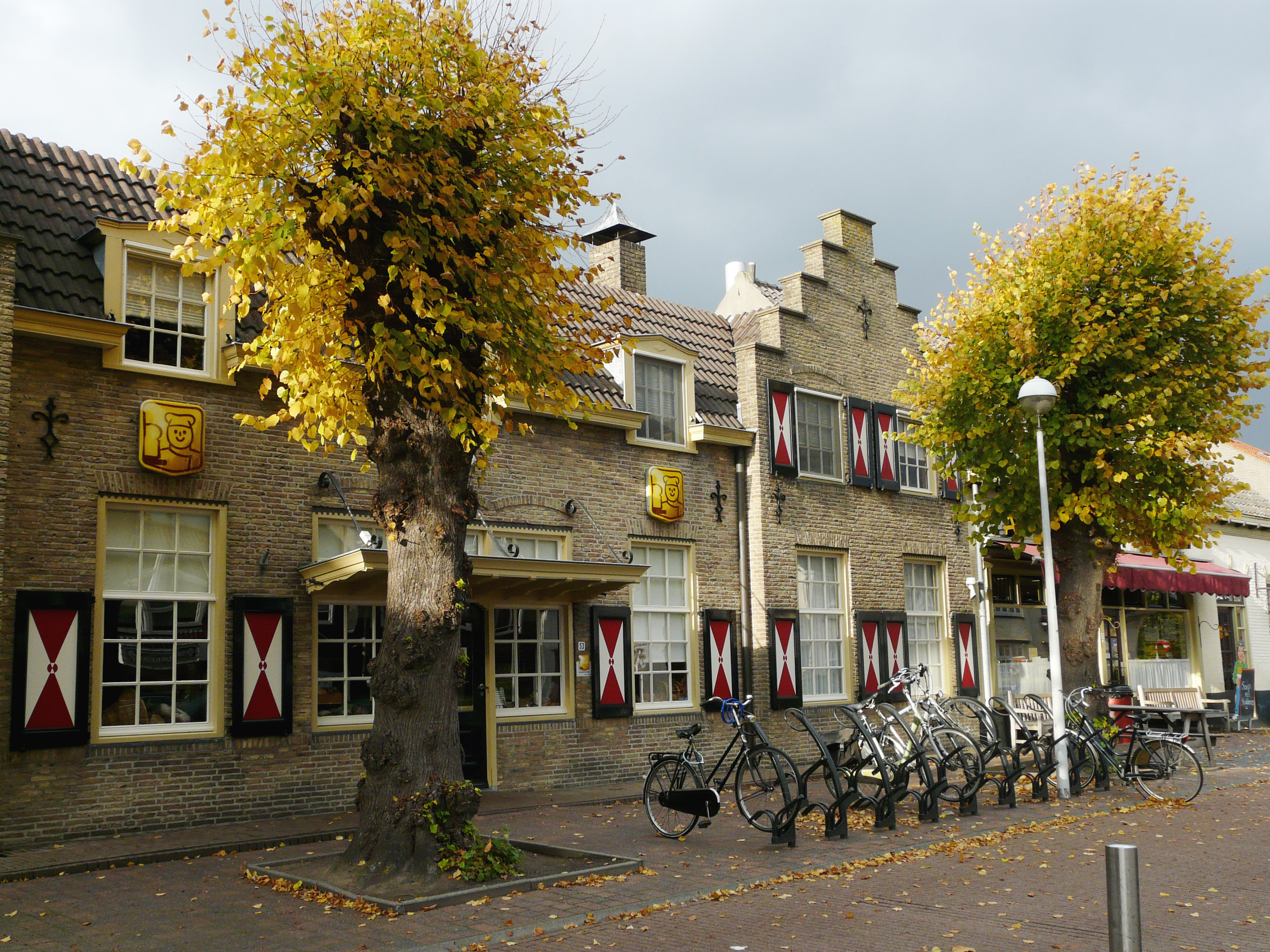
Bakery

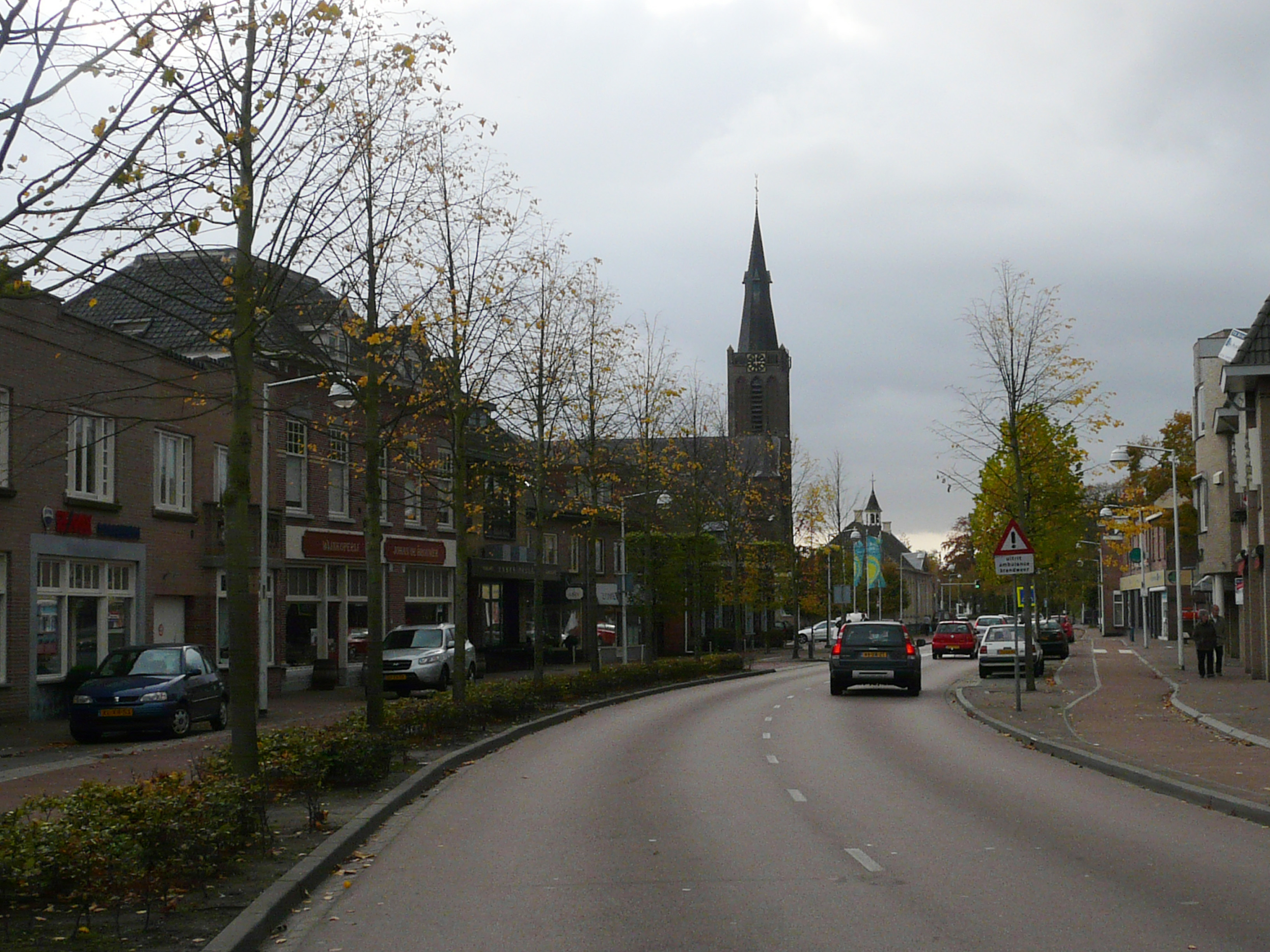
Street view
