= Aaron Van Poucke =

Belgian cyclist

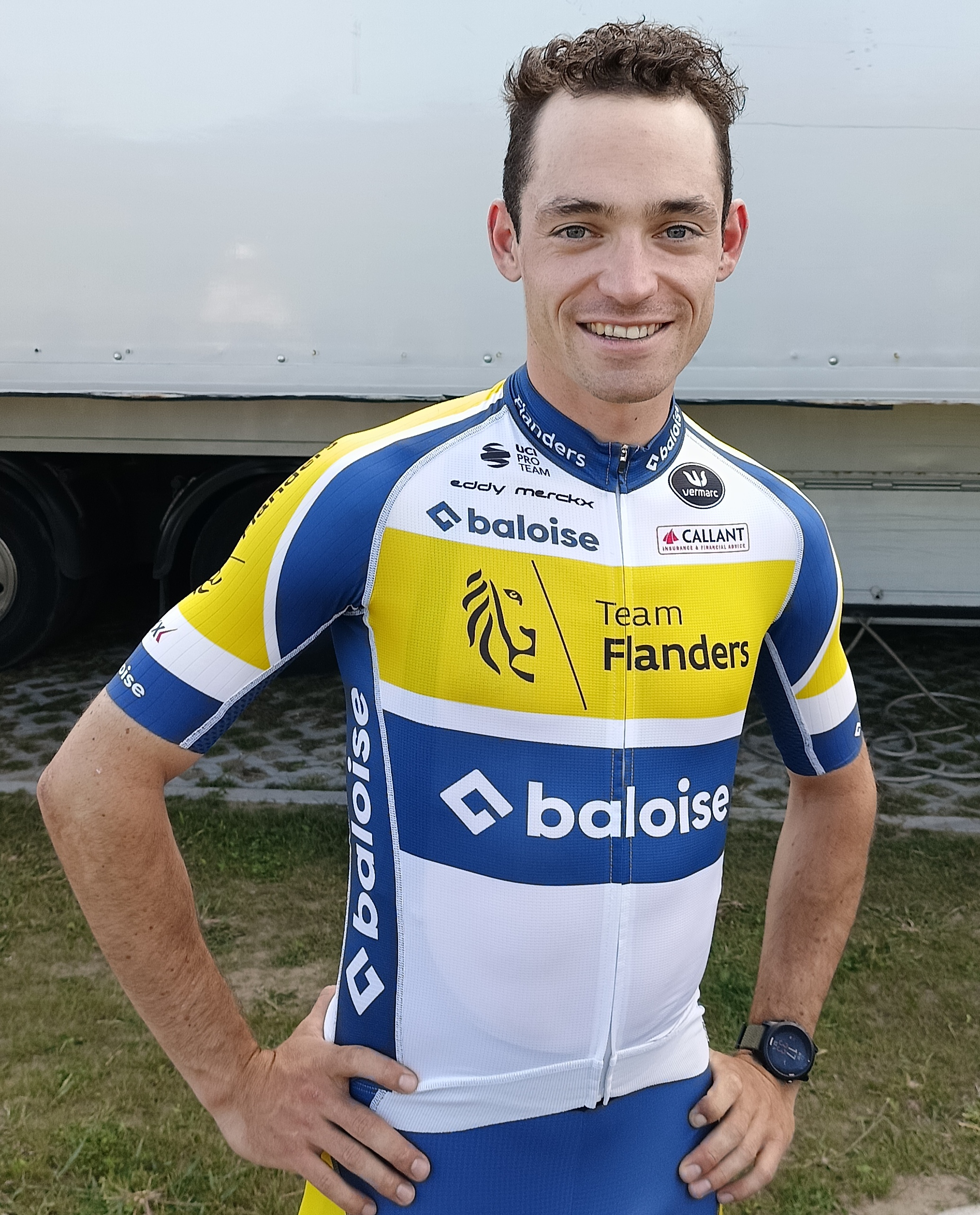
- Van Poucke at the 2024 Renewi Tour

Personal information
- Born: 4 April 1998 (age 28) Bruges, Belgium
- Height: 1.77 m (5 ft 10 in)
- Weight: 68 kg (150 lb)

Cycling career
- Sport: Cycling
- Discipline: Road
- Role: Rider

Amateur teams
- 2016: Isorex
- 2017: VL Technics–Experza–Abutriek
- 2018: Lotto–Soudal U23

Professional team
- 2019–2025: Sport Vlaanderen–Baloise

Aaron Van Poucke (born 4 April 1998 in Bruges) is a retired Belgian professional road bicycle racer, who most recently rode for UCI ProTeam Team Flanders–Baloise.

== Major results ==
2016
3rd La Route des Géants
5th Overall Aubel-Thimister-La Gleize
2018
1st Stage 1 (TTT) Okolo Jižních Čech
3rd Overall Course de Solidarność et des Champions Olympiques

1st Young rider classification

7th Lillehammer GP
2019
10th Cholet-Pays de Loire
2020
10th Paris–Chauny
2022
1st Mountains classification, Tour de Hongrie
3rd Overall ZLM Tour
2023
1st Sprints classification, Vuelta a Andalucía
2024
3rd SD WORX BW Classic
