= Bilzen-Hoeselt =

- Municipality
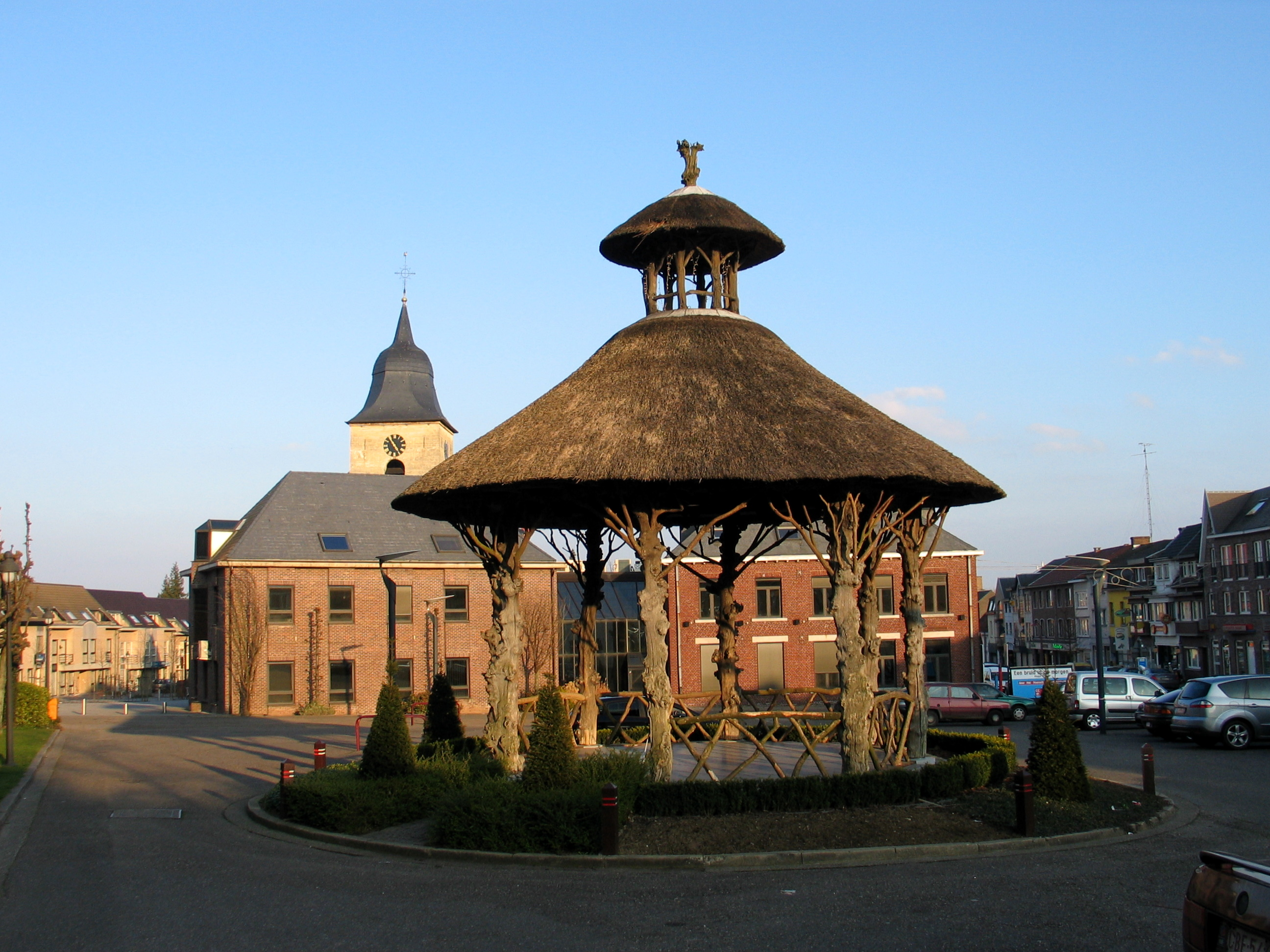

- Location of Bilzen-Hoeselt in Limburg
- Interactive map of Bilzen-Hoeselt
- Location in Belgium
- Coordinates: 50°52′N 05°30′E
- Country: Belgium
- Community: community
- Region: region
- Province: Limburg
- Arrondissement: Tongeren
- Area codes: 089

Bilzen-Hoeselt is a municipality located in the Belgian province of Limburg. It was established on 1 January 2025 as the result of the voluntary merger of the municipalities of Bilzen and Hoeselt. The merged municipality has an area of 106 km^{2} and approximately 42,000 inhabitants.

Bilzen-Hoeselt is one of the 14 municipalities that was created during the merger wave of 2025. Initially, Riemst was also involved in the exploratory discussions for the merger, but in 2021, the municipal council of the latter decided to remain independent. The municipal authorities of Bilzen and Hoeselt then continued as two. On 28 June 2021, the municipal councils of Bilzen and Hoeselt approved the principle of the merger of the two municipalities. The two municipalities merged on 1 January 2025. The residents chose "Bilzen-Hoeselt" as the new name for the merged municipality via an online vote. This beat the options Biesen, Demershoven and Bivelen with 57% of the votes.

The merger took effect after the municipal elections on 13 October 2024.
