= Cériel Desal =

Belgian cyclist

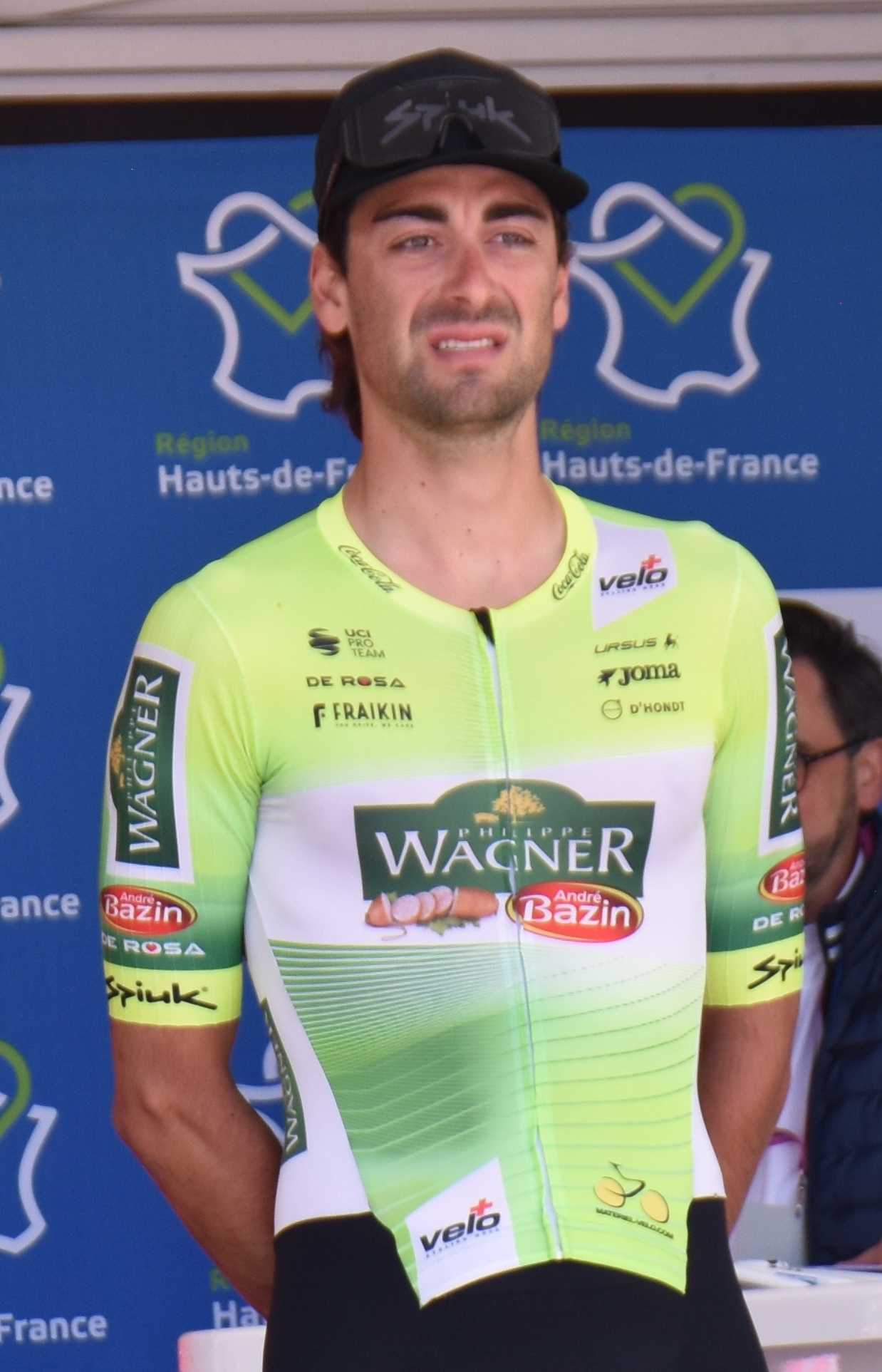
- Desal in 2025

Personal information
- Born: 20 October 1999 (age 26) Roeselare, Belgium
- Height: 1.87 m (6 ft 2 in)
- Weight: 72 kg (159 lb)

Cycling career
- Sport: Cycling
- Current team: Soudal–Quick-Step Devo Team
- Discipline: Road
- Role: Rider

Amateur teams
- 2016–2017: CT Luc Wallays–Jonge Renners
- 2018–2021: EFC–L&R–Vulsteke

Professional teams
- 2021: Bingoal WB (stagiaire)
- 2022–2025: Bingoal Pauwels Sauces WB
- 2026–: Soudal–Quick-Step Devo Team

Cériel Desal (born 20 October 1999) is a Belgian cyclist, who currently rides for UCI Continental Team Soudal–Quick-Step Devo Team.

Desal is the grandson of Benoni Beheyt, who was the 1963 UCI Road Race World Champion. His cousin Guillaume Van Keirsbulck is also a cyclist.

== Major results ==
2017
3rd Overall Keizer der Juniores
4th La route des Géants
7th Menen–Kemmel–Menen
2018
2nd Memorial Danny Jonckheere
2021
2nd Gullegem Koerse
3rd Memorial Danny Jonckheere
2022
6th Omloop Mandel-Leie-Schelde Meulebeke
10th Overall ZLM Tour
2024
2nd Grand Prix de Denain
2026
1st Boucle de l'Artois
1st Grand Prix Cerami
5th Overall Kreiz Breizh Elites
