= General classification =

Category that tracks overall times for bicycle riders in multi-stage bicycle races

The general classification (or the GC) in road bicycle racing is the category that tracks overall times for riders in multi-stage races. Each stage will have a stage winner, but the overall winner in the GC is the rider who has the fastest cumulative time across all stages. Hence, whoever leads the GC is generally regarded as the overall leader or winner of the race.

Riders who finish in the same group are awarded the same time, with possible subtractions due to time bonuses. Two riders are said to have finished in the same group if the gap between them is less than three seconds. A crash or mechanical incident in the final 3 kilometres of a stage that finishes without a categorised climb usually means that riders thus affected are considered to have finished as part of the group they were with at the 3 km mark, so long as they finish the stage.

It is possible to win the GC without winning a stage. It is also possible to win the GC race without being the GC leader before the last stage.

The most important stages of a bicycle race for GC contenders are mountain stages and individual time trial stages, both of which offer good opportunities for a single racer to outperform other racers.

== Jerseys ==
In many bicycle races, the current leader of the GC gets a special jersey awarded. In the Tour de France, the leader wears a yellow jersey, in the Giro d'Italia a pink jersey, and in the Vuelta a España the leader's jersey is red.

=== Jerseys of the major stage races ===
Race	Year	Maillot of the general classification	Category UCI 2022
Tour de France	1903	Yellow	First (UCI WorldTour)
Tour of Belgium	1908	Blue	Second (UCI ProSeries)
(Italy) Giro d'Italia	1909	Pink	First (UCI WorldTour)
(Spain) Volta a Catalunya	1911	White with horizontal green stripes	First (UCI WorldTour)
Tour of Germany	1911	Red	Second (UCI ProSeries)
(Spain) Vuelta al País Vasco	1924	Yellow	First (UCI WorldTour)
(Poland) Tour de Pologne	1928	Yellow	First (UCI WorldTour)
(France) Paris–Nice	1933	Yellow	First (UCI WorldTour)
(Switzerland) Tour de Suisse	1933	Yellow	First (UCI WorldTour)
(Spain) Vuelta a España	1935	Red	First (UCI WorldTour)
(France) Critérium du Dauphiné	1947	Yellow with horizontal blue stripe	First (UCI WorldTour)
(Switzerland) Tour de Romandie	1947	Green	First (UCI WorldTour)
(France) 4 jours de Dunquerke	1955	Pink	Second (UCI ProSeries)
(Italy) Tirreno–Adriatico	1966	Blue	First (UCI WorldTour)
(Belgium) Tour de Wallonie	1974	Yellow	Second (UCI ProSeries)
(Australia) Tour Down Under	1999	Orange	First (UCI WorldTour)
Tour of Benelux	2005	Blue	First (UCI WorldTour)

The listed year is the first edition of the race. The jersey was sometimes added later.

== See also ==
- Points classification
- Mountains classification
- Young rider classification
