= 2025 Lidl–Trek (men's team) season =

Lidl–Trek
- 2025 season
- UCI code: LTK
- Status: UCI WorldTeam
- Manager: Luca Guercilena (ITA)
- Main sponsor(s): Lidl; Trek
- Based: United States
- Bicycles: Trek
- Groupset: SRAM

Season victories
- One-day races: 6
- Stage race overall: 2
- Stage race stages: 26
- National Championships: 9
- Most wins: (Denmark) Mads Pedersen (13)

The 2025 season for the Lidl–Trek is the 15th season in the team's existence, all of them as a UCI WorldTeam.

== Team roster ==
All ages are as of 1 January 2025, the first day of the 2025 season.

As of January 5, 2025.

Rider	Date of birth
Andrea Bagioli (ITA)	March 23, 1999 (age 27)
Julien Bernard (FRA)	March 17, 1992 (age 34)
Simone Consonni (ITA)	September 12, 1994 (age 32)
Giulio Ciccone (ITA)	December 20, 1994 (age 31)
Tim Declercq (BEL)	March 29, 1989 (age 37)
Tao Geoghegan Hart (GBR)	March 30, 1995 (age 31)
Amanuel Ghebreigzabhier (ERI)	August 17, 1994 (age 32)
Ryan Gibbons (RSA)	August 13, 1994 (age 32)
Daan Hoole (NED)	February 22, 1999 (age 27)
Lennard Kämna (GER)	September 9, 1996 (age 30)
Alex Kirsch (LUX)	June 12, 1992 (age 34)
Patrick Konrad (AUT)	October 23, 1991 (age 34)
Søren Kragh Andersen (DEN)	August 10, 1994 (age 32)
Juan Pedro López (ESP)	July 31, 1997 (age 29)
Jonathan Milan (ITA)	October 1, 2000 (age 25)

Rider	Date of birth
Bauke Mollema (NED)	November 26, 1986 (age 39)
Jacopo Mosca (ITA)	August 29, 1993 (age 33)
Thibau Nys (BEL)	November 12, 2002 (age 23)
Sam Oomen (NED)	August 15, 1995 (age 31)
Mads Pedersen (DEN)	December 18, 1995 (age 30)
Albert Philipsen (DEN)	September 3, 2006 (age 20)
Quinn Simmons (USA)	May 8, 2001 (age 25)
Mattias Skjelmose (DEN)	September 26, 2000 (age 26)
Toms Skujiņš (LAT)	June 15, 1991 (age 35)
Jasper Stuyven (BEL)	April 17, 1992 (age 34)
Tim Torn Teutenberg (GER)	June 19, 2002 (age 24)
Edward Theuns (BEL)	April 30, 1991 (age 35)
Mathias Vacek (CZE)	June 12, 2002 (age 24)
Otto Vergaerde (BEL)	July 15, 1994 (age 32)
Carlos Verona (ESP)	November 4, 1992 (age 33)

== Season victories ==
Date	Race	Competition	Rider	Country	Location	Ref.
5 February	Volta a la Comunitat Valenciana, stage 1 (TTT)	UCI ProSeries	(Note: The riders in the squad were Simone Consonni, Amanuel Ghebreigzabhier, Daan Hoole, Jonathan Milan, Jakob Söderqvist, Edward Theuns and Mathias Vacek.)	Spain	Orihuela	
9 February	Volta a la Comunitat Valenciana, stage 5	UCI ProSeries	Jonathan Milan (ITA)	Spain	Valencia	
15 February	Tour de la Provence, stage 2	UCI Europe Tour	Mads Pedersen (DEN)	France	Manosque	
16 February	Tour de la Provence, overall	UCI Europe Tour	Mads Pedersen (DEN)	France		
17 February	UAE Tour, stage 1	UCI World Tour	Jonathan Milan (ITA)	United Arab Emirates	Liwa Palace	
20 February	UAE Tour, stage 4	UCI World Tour	Jonathan Milan (ITA)	United Arab Emirates	Umm Al Quwain	
11 March	Tirreno–Adriatico, stage 2	UCI World Tour	Jonathan Milan (ITA)	Italy	Follonica	
14 March	Paris–Nice, stage 6	UCI World Tour	Mads Pedersen (DEN)	France	Berre l'Étang	
16 March	Tirreno–Adriatico, stage 7	UCI World Tour	Jonathan Milan (ITA)	Italy	San Benedetto del Tronto	
16 March	Bredene Koksijde Classic	UCI ProSeries	Edward Theuns (BEL)	Belgium	Koksijde	
29 March	Volta a Catalunya, stage 6	UCI World Tour	Quinn Simmons (USA)	Spain	Berga	
30 March	Gent–Wevelgem	UCI World Tour	Mads Pedersen (DEN)	Belgium	Wevelgem	
5 April	GP Miguel Induráin	UCI ProSeries	Thibau Nys (BEL)	Spain	Estella-Lizarra	
20 April	Amstel Gold Race	UCI World Tour	Mattias Skjelmose (DEN)	Netherlands	Berg en Terblijt	
21 April	Tour of the Alps, stage 1	UCI ProSeries	Giulio Ciccone (ITA)	Italy	San Lorenzo Dorsino	
9 May	Giro d'Italia, stage 1	UCI World Tour	Mads Pedersen (DEN)	Albania	Tirana	
11 May	Giro d'Italia, stage 3	UCI World Tour	Mads Pedersen (DEN)	Albania	Vlorë	
14 May	Giro d'Italia, stage 5	UCI World Tour	Mads Pedersen (DEN)	Italy	Matera	
20 May	Giro d'Italia, stage 10 (ITT)	UCI World Tour	Daan Hoole (NED)	Italy	Pisa	
23 May	Giro d'Italia, stage 13	UCI World Tour	Mads Pedersen (DEN)	Italy	Vicenza	
25 May	Giro d'Italia, stage 15	UCI World Tour	Carlos Verona (ESP)	Italy	Asiago	
9 June	Critérium du Dauphiné, stage 2	UCI World Tour	Jonathan Milan (ITA)	France	Issoire	
17 June	Tour de Suisse, stage 3	UCI World Tour	Quinn Simmons (USA)	Switzerland	Heiden	
22 June	Andorra MoraBanc Clàssica	UCI Europe Tour	Mattias Skjelmose (DEN)	Andorra	Coll de la Botella	
12 July	Tour de France, stage 8	UCI World Tour	Jonathan Milan (ITA)	France	Laval	
23 July	Tour de France, stage 17	UCI World Tour	Jonathan Milan (ITA)	France	Valence	
29 July	Tour de Wallonie, stage 4	UCI ProSeries	Mathias Vacek (CZE)	Belgium	Seraing	
2 August	Clásica de San Sebastián	UCI World Tour	Giulio Ciccone (ITA)	Spain	San Sebastián	
9 August	Vuelta a Burgos, stage 5	UCI ProSeries	Giulio Ciccone (ITA)	Spain	Lagunas de Neila	
12 August	Tour of Denmark, stage 1	UCI ProSeries	Mads Pedersen (DEN)	Denmark	Rønne	
14 August	Tour of Denmark, stage 3 (ITT)	UCI ProSeries	Jakob Söderqvist (SWE)	Denmark	Kerteminde	
15 August	Tour of Denmark, stage 4	UCI ProSeries	Mads Pedersen (DEN)	Denmark	Vejle	
16 August	Tour of Denmark, stage 5	UCI ProSeries	Mads Pedersen (DEN)	Denmark	Silkeborg	
16 August	Tour of Denmark, overall	UCI ProSeries	Mads Pedersen (DEN)	Denmark		

== National, Continental, and World Champions ==
Date	Discipline	Jersey	Rider	Country	Location	Ref.
26 May	United States National Road Race Championships		Quinn Simmons (USA)	United States	Charleston	
24 June	Dutch National Time Trial Championships		Daan Hoole (NED)	Netherlands	Surhuisterveen	
25 June	Latvian National Time Trial Championships		Toms Skujiņš (LAT)	Latvia	Riga	
25 June	Czech National Time Trial Championships		Mathias Vacek (CZE)	Slovakia (Note: The Czech and Slovak national time trial championships were jointly held in Horné Naštice, Slovakia.)	Horné Naštice	
27 June	Eritrean National Time Trial Championships		Amanuel Ghebreigzabhier (ERI)	Eritrea		
27 June	Danish National Time Trial Championships		Mads Pedersen (DEN)	Denmark	Aalborg	
29 June	Czech National Road Race Championships		Mathias Vacek (CZE)	Slovakia (Note: The Czech and Slovak national road race championships were jointly held in Bánovce nad Bebravou, Slovakia.)	Bánovce nad Bebravou	
29 June	Danish National Road Race Championships		Søren Kragh Andersen (DEN)	Denmark	Aalborg	
29 June	Latvian National Road Race Championships		Toms Skujiņš (LAT)	Latvia	Cēsu novads	
