= 2025 Tour of Belgium =

2025 UCI ProSeries

Race details
- Dates: 18–22 June 2025
- Stages: 5
- Distance: 758.1 km (471.1 mi)
- Winning time: 16h 39' 07"

Results
Jersey awarded to the overall winner	Winner	Filippo Baroncini (ITA)	(UAE Team Emirates XRG)
	Second	Ethan Hayter (GBR)	(Soudal–Quick-Step)
	Third	Jenno Berckmoes (BEL)	(Lotto)
Jersey awarded to the points classification winner	Points	Juan Sebastián Molano (COL)	(UAE Team Emirates XRG)
Jersey awarded to the youth classification winner	Youth	Alec Segaert (BEL)	(Lotto)
Jersey awarded to the combativity classification winner	Combativity	Dylan Vandenstorme (BEL)	(Team Flanders–Baloise)
	Team	(Belgium) Lotto	

The 2025 Tour of Belgium (known as the 2025 Baloise Belgium Tour for sponsorship purposes) is the 94th edition of the Tour of Belgium road cycling stage race, which is taking place between 18 and 22 June 2025. The category 2.Pro event forms a part of the 2025 UCI ProSeries.

== Teams ==
Eight UCI WorldTeams, nine UCI ProTeams, three UCI Continental, and two UCI Cyclo-cross teams make up the twenty-two teams that participate in the race.

UCI WorldTeams

- Alpecin–Deceuninck
- Ineos Grenadiers
- Intermarché–Wanty
- Lidl–Trek
- Movistar Team
- Soudal–Quick-Step
- Team Picnic–PostNL
- UAE Team Emirates XRG

UCI ProTeams

- Israel–Premier Tech
- Lotto
- Team Flanders–Baloise
- Team Novo Nordisk
- Team TotalEnergies
- Tudor Pro Cycling Team
- Unibet Tietema Rockets
- Uno-X Mobility
- Wagner Bazin WB

UCI Continental Teams

- BEAT Cycling Club
- Metec–Solarwatt p/b Mantel
- Tarteletto–Isorex

UCI Cyclo-cross Teams

- Baloise Glowi Lions
- Pauwels Sauzen–Cibel Clementines

== Route ==
Stage characteristics and winners
Stage	Date	Course	Distance	Type	Stage winner
1	18 June	Merelbeke-Melle to Knokke-Heist	197.6 km (122.8 mi)	Flat stage	Tim Merlier (BEL)
2	19 June	Beringen to Putte	194.4 km (120.8 mi)	Flat stage	Jasper Philipsen (BEL)
3	20 June	Tessenderlo to Ham	9.7 km (6.0 mi)	Individual time trial	Ethan Hayter (GBR)
4	21 June	Durbuy to Durbuy	173 km (107 mi)	Hilly stage	Jenno Berckmoes (BEL)
5	22 June	Brussels to Brussels	183.4 km (114.0 mi)	Flat stage	Tim Merlier (BEL)
Total			758.1 km (471.1 mi)		

== Stages ==
=== Stage 1 ===
18 June 2025 — Merelbeke-Melle to Knokke-Heist, 197.6 km (122.8 mi)

Stage 1 Result
Rank	Rider	Team	Time
1	Tim Merlier (BEL)	Soudal–Quick-Step	4h 23' 43"
2	Juan Sebastián Molano (COL)	UAE Team Emirates XRG	+ 0"
3	Ethan Vernon (GBR)	Israel–Premier Tech	+ 0"
4	Fernando Gaviria (COL)	Movistar Team	+ 0"
5	Alberto Dainese (ITA)	Tudor Pro Cycling Team	+ 0"
6	Jason Tesson (FRA)	Team TotalEnergies	+ 0"
7	Tim Torn Teutenberg (GER)	Lidl–Trek	+ 0"
8	Casper van Uden (NED)	Team Picnic–PostNL	+ 0"
9	Leander Van Hautegem (BEL)	Wagner Bazin WB	+ 0"
10	Luca Van Boven (BEL)	Intermarché–Wanty	+ 0"

General classification after Stage 1
Rank	Rider	Team	Time
1	Tim Merlier (BEL)	Soudal–Quick-Step	4h 23' 33"
2	Juan Sebastián Molano (COL)	UAE Team Emirates XRG	+ 4"
3	Ethan Vernon (GBR)	Israel–Premier Tech	+ 6"
4	Ben Turner (GBR)	Ineos Grenadiers	+ 7"
5	Jenno Berckmoes (BEL)	Lotto	+ 7"
6	Søren Kragh Andersen (DEN)	Lidl–Trek	+ 7"
7	Ådne Holter (NOR)	Uno-X Mobility	+ 8"
8	Filippo Ganna (ITA)	Ineos Grenadiers	+ 8"
9	Florian Vermeersch (BEL)	UAE Team Emirates XRG	+ 9"
10	Jasper Philipsen (BEL)	Alpecin–Deceuninck	+ 9"

=== Stage 2 ===
19 June 2025 — Beringen to Putte, 194.4 km (120.8 mi)

Stage 2 Result
Rank	Rider	Team	Time
1	Jasper Philipsen (BEL)	Alpecin–Deceuninck	4h 07' 27"
2	Juan Sebastián Molano (COL)	UAE Team Emirates XRG	+ 0"
3	Jenno Berckmoes (BEL)	Lotto	+ 0"
4	Tim Torn Teutenberg (GER)	Lidl–Trek	+ 0"
5	Florian Dauphin (FRA)	Team TotalEnergies	+ 0"
6	Matyáš Kopecký (CZE)	Team Novo Nordisk	+ 0"
7	Tim Merlier (BEL)	Soudal–Quick-Step	+ 0"
8	Steffen De Schuyteneer (BEL)	Lotto	+ 0"
9	Fernando Gaviria (COL)	Movistar Team	+ 0"
10	Lindsay De Vylder (BEL)	Team Flanders–Baloise	+ 0"

General classification after Stage 2
Rank	Rider	Team	Time
1	Juan Sebastián Molano (COL)	UAE Team Emirates XRG	8h 30' 58"
2	Jasper Philipsen (BEL)	Alpecin–Deceuninck	+ 1"
3	Tim Merlier (BEL)	Soudal–Quick-Step	+ 2"
4	Jenno Berckmoes (BEL)	Lotto	+ 5"
5	Olivier Godfroid (BEL)	Baloise Glowi Lions	+ 6"
6	Axel van der Tuuk (NED)	Metec–Solarwatt p/b Mantel	+ 6"
7	Wessel Mouris (NED)	Unibet Tietema Rockets	+ 6"
8	Ethan Vernon (GBR)	Israel–Premier Tech	+ 8"
9	Ben Turner (GBR)	Ineos Grenadiers	+ 9"
10	Søren Kragh Andersen (DEN)	Lidl–Trek	+ 9"

=== Stage 3 ===
20 June 2025 — Tessenderlo to Ham, 9.7 km (6.0 mi) (ITT)

Stage 3 Result
Rank	Rider	Team	Time
1	Ethan Hayter (GBR)	Soudal–Quick-Step	10' 29"
2	Filippo Ganna (ITA)	Ineos Grenadiers	+ 4"
3	Florian Vermeersch (BEL)	UAE Team Emirates XRG	+ 16"
4	Filippo Baroncini (ITA)	UAE Team Emirates XRG	+ 17"
5	Huub Artz (NED)	Intermarché–Wanty	+ 18"
6	Connor Swift (GBR)	Ineos Grenadiers	+ 19"
7	Alec Segaert (BEL)	Lotto	+ 20"
8	Pier-André Côté (CAN)	Israel–Premier Tech	+ 22"
9	Ben Turner (GBR)	Ineos Grenadiers	+ 23"
10	Rune Herregodts (BEL)	UAE Team Emirates XRG	+ 23"

General classification after Stage 3
Rank	Rider	Team	Time
1	Ethan Hayter (GBR)	Soudal–Quick-Step	8h 41' 39"
2	Filippo Ganna (ITA)	Ineos Grenadiers	+ 2"
3	Florian Vermeersch (BEL)	UAE Team Emirates XRG	+ 15"
4	Filippo Baroncini (ITA)	UAE Team Emirates XRG	+ 17"
5	Huub Artz (NED)	Intermarché–Wanty	+ 18"
6	Axel van der Tuuk (NED)	Metec–Solarwatt p/b Mantel	+ 19"
7	Connor Swift (GBR)	Ineos Grenadiers	+ 19"
8	Ben Turner (GBR)	Ineos Grenadiers	+ 20"
9	Ethan Vernon (GBR)	Israel–Premier Tech	+ 20"
10	Alec Segaert (BEL)	Lotto	+ 20"

=== Stage 4 ===
21 June 2025 — Durbuy to Durbuy, 173 km (107 mi)

Stage 4 Result
Rank	Rider	Team	Time
1	Jenno Berckmoes (BEL)	Lotto	4h 00' 34"
2	Marco Frigo (ITA)	Israel–Premier Tech	+ 5"
3	Orluis Aular (VEN)	Movistar Team	+ 5"
4	Filippo Baroncini (ITA)	UAE Team Emirates XRG	+ 5"
5	Alexandre Delettre (FRA)	Team TotalEnergies	+ 17"
6	Toon Aerts (BEL)	Lotto	+ 17"
7	Dion Smith (NZL)	Intermarché–Wanty	+ 17"
8	Ådne Holter (NOR)	Uno-X Mobility	+ 17"
9	Pier-André Côté (CAN)	Israel–Premier Tech	+ 17"
10	Florian Vermeersch (BEL)	UAE Team Emirates XRG	+ 17"

General classification after Stage 4
Rank	Rider	Team	Time
1	Filippo Baroncini (ITA)	UAE Team Emirates XRG	12h 42' 29"
2	Ethan Hayter (GBR)	Soudal–Quick-Step	+ 4"
3	Jenno Berckmoes (BEL)	Lotto	+ 7"
4	Filippo Ganna (ITA)	Ineos Grenadiers	+ 10"
5	Marco Frigo (ITA)	Israel–Premier Tech	+ 11"
6	Florian Vermeersch (BEL)	UAE Team Emirates XRG	+ 16"
7	Orluis Aular (VEN)	Movistar Team	+ 18"
8	Jasper Philipsen (BEL)	Alpecin–Deceuninck	+ 22"
9	Pier-André Côté (CAN)	Israel–Premier Tech	+ 23"
10	Axel van der Tuuk (NED)	Metec–Solarwatt p/b Mantel	+ 23"

=== Stage 5 ===
22 June 2025 — Brussels to Brussels, 183.4 km (114.0 mi)

Stage 5 Result
Rank	Rider	Team	Time
1	Tim Merlier (BEL)	Soudal–Quick-Step	3h 56' 38"
2	Juan Sebastián Molano (COL)	UAE Team Emirates XRG	+ 0"
3	Kim Heiduk (GER)	Ineos Grenadiers	+ 0"
4	Tim Torn Teutenberg (GER)	Lidl–Trek	+ 0"
5	Jasper Philipsen (BEL)	Alpecin–Deceuninck	+ 0"
6	Arne Marit (BEL)	Intermarché–Wanty	+ 0"
7	Matyáš Kopecký (CZE)	Team Novo Nordisk	+ 0"
8	Ethan Vernon (GBR)	Israel–Premier Tech	+ 0"
9	Alberto Dainese (ITA)	Tudor Pro Cycling Team	+ 0"
10	Tom Van Asbroeck (BEL)	Israel–Premier Tech	+ 0"

General classification after Stage 5
Rank	Rider	Team	Time
1	Filippo Baroncini (ITA)	UAE Team Emirates XRG	16h 39' 07"
2	Ethan Hayter (GBR)	Soudal–Quick-Step	+ 4"
3	Jenno Berckmoes (BEL)	Lotto	+ 7"
4	Filippo Ganna (ITA)	Ineos Grenadiers	+ 10"
5	Marco Frigo (ITA)	Israel–Premier Tech	+ 11"
6	Florian Vermeersch (BEL)	UAE Team Emirates XRG	+ 16"
7	Orluis Aular (VEN)	Movistar Team	+ 18"
8	Jasper Philipsen (BEL)	Alpecin–Deceuninck	+ 22"
9	Pier-André Côté (CAN)	Israel–Premier Tech	+ 23"
10	Axel van der Tuuk (NED)	Metec–Solarwatt p/b Mantel	+ 23"

== Classification leadership table ==
Classification leadership by stage
Stage	Winner	General classification (Dutch: Algemeen klassement)	Points classification (Dutch: Puntenklassement)	Combativity classification (Dutch: Strijdlustklassement)	Young rider classification (Dutch: Jongerenklassement)	Team classification (Dutch: Ploegenklassement)
1	Tim Merlier	Tim Merlier	Tim Merlier	Dylan Vandenstorme	Tim Torn Teutenberg	Team Flanders–Baloise
2	Jasper Philipsen	Juan Sebastián Molano	Juan Sebastián Molano	Alex Colman	Wessel Mouris	Team Flanders–Baloise
3	Ethan Hayter	Ethan Hayter	Juan Sebastián Molano	Alex Colman	Huub Artz	Ineos Grenadiers
4	Jenno Berckmoes	Filippo Baroncini	Jenno Berckmoes	Dylan Vandenstorme	Alec Segaert	Lotto
5	Tim Merlier	Filippo Baroncini	Juan Sebastián Molano	Dylan Vandenstorme	Alec Segaert	Lotto
Final		Filippo Baroncini	Juan Sebastián Molano	Dylan Vandenstorme	Alec Segaert	Lotto

== Classification standings ==
Legend
Denotes the winner of the general classification	Denotes the winner of the combativity classification
Denotes the winner of the points classification	Denotes the winner of the young rider classification

=== General classification ===
Final general classification (1–10)
Rank	Rider	Team	Time
1	Filippo Baroncini (ITA)	UAE Team Emirates XRG	16h 39' 07"
2	Ethan Hayter (GBR)	Soudal–Quick-Step	+ 4"
3	Jenno Berckmoes (BEL)	Lotto	+ 7"
4	Filippo Ganna (ITA)	Ineos Grenadiers	+ 10"
5	Marco Frigo (ITA)	Israel–Premier Tech	+ 11"
6	Florian Vermeersch (BEL)	UAE Team Emirates XRG	+ 16"
7	Orluis Aular (VEN)	Movistar Team	+ 18"
8	Jasper Philipsen (BEL)	Alpecin–Deceuninck	+ 22"
9	Pier-André Côté (CAN)	Israel–Premier Tech	+ 23"
10	Axel van der Tuuk (NED)	Metec–Solarwatt p/b Mantel	+ 23"

=== Points classification ===
Final points classification (1–10)
Rank	Rider	Team	Points
1	Juan Sebastián Molano (COL)	UAE Team Emirates XRG	75
2	Tim Merlier (BEL)	Soudal–Quick-Step	73
3	Jenno Berckmoes (BEL)	Lotto	52
4	Tim Torn Teutenberg (GER)	Lidl–Trek	51
5	Jasper Philipsen (BEL)	Alpecin–Deceuninck	47
6	Ethan Vernon (GBR)	Israel–Premier Tech	34
7	Filippo Baroncini (ITA)	UAE Team Emirates XRG	33
8	Fernando Gaviria (COL)	Movistar Team	30
9	Matyáš Kopecký (CZE)	Team Novo Nordisk	28
10	Alberto Dainese (ITA)	Tudor Pro Cycling Team	28

=== Combativity classification ===
Final combativity classification (1–10)
Rank	Rider	Team	Points
1	Dylan Vandenstorme (BEL)	Team Flanders–Baloise	75
2	Yorben Lauryssen (BEL)	Pauwels Sauzen–Cibel Clementines	53
3	Roy Hoogendoorn (NED)	Metec–Solarwatt p/b Mantel	45
4	Alex Colman (BEL)	Team Flanders–Baloise	30
5	Quentin Bezza (FRA)	Wagner Bazin WB	27
6	Kenay De Moyer (BEL)	Pauwels Sauzen–Cibel Clementines	26
7	Alexys Brunel (FRA)	Team TotalEnergies	21
8	Alex Vandenbulcke (BEL)	Tarteletto–Isorex	19
9	Luca De Meester (BEL)	Wagner Bazin WB	16
10	Victor Broex (NED)	Metec–Solarwatt p/b Mantel	15

=== Young rider classification ===
Final young rider classification (1–10)
Rank	Rider	Team	Time
1	Alec Segaert (BEL)	Lotto	16h 39' 36"
2	Héctor Álvarez (ESP)	Lidl–Trek	+ 13"
3	Matyáš Kopecký (CZE)	Team Novo Nordisk	+ 28"
4	Tim Torn Teutenberg (GER)	Lidl–Trek	+ 1' 14"
5	Huub Artz (NED)	Intermarché–Wanty	+ 1' 53"
6	Frits Biesterbos (NED)	BEAT Cycling Club	+ 2' 02"
7	David Haverdings (NED)	Baloise Glowi Lions	+ 2' 19"
8	Viktor Vandenberghe (BEL)	Pauwels Sauzen–Cibel Clementines	+ 2' 30"
9	Kay De Bruyckere (BEL)	Pauwels Sauzen–Cibel Clementines	+ 3' 18"
10	Steffen De Schuyteneer (BEL)	Lotto	+ 9' 31"

=== Team classification ===
Final team classification (1–10)
Rank	Team	Time
1	(Belgium) Lotto	49h 58' 43"
2	(Spain) Movistar Team	+ 23"
3	(France) Team TotalEnergies	+ 40"
4	Israel–Premier Tech	+ 41"
5	(United States) Lidl–Trek	+ 1' 28"
6	(France) Unibet Tietema Rockets	+ 1' 45"
7	(Belgium) Intermarché–Wanty	+ 8' 08"
8	(United Arab Emirates) UAE Team Emirates XRG	+ 9' 09"
9	(Belgium) Team Flanders–Baloise	+ 10' 24"
10	(Norway) Uno-X Mobility	+ 11' 14"
