= 2025 Danmark Rundt =

2025 UCI ProSeries
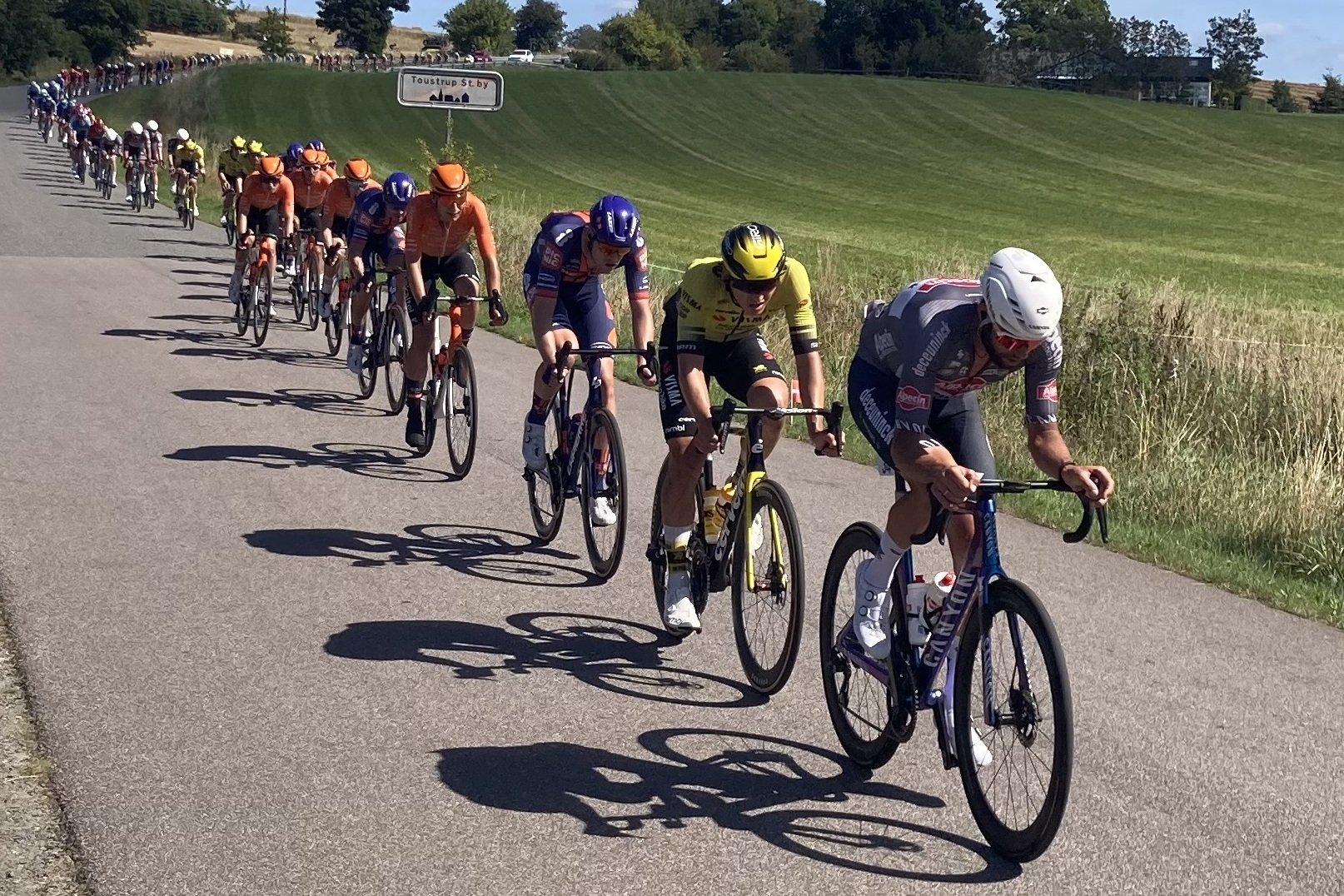
- The peloton passing through Tovstrup Stationsby

Race details
- Dates: 12–16 August 2025
- Stages: 5
- Distance: 687.4 km (427.1 mi)
- Winning time: 15h 08' 16"

Results
Jersey awarded to the overall winner	Winner	Mads Pedersen (DEN)	(Lidl–Trek)
	Second	Jakob Söderqvist (SWE)	(Lidl–Trek)
	Third	Niklas Larsen (DEN)	(BHS–PL Beton Bornholm)
Jersey awarded to the points classification winner	Points	Mads Pedersen (DEN)	(Lidl–Trek)
Jersey awarded to the mountains classification winner	Mountains	Marius Innhaug Dahl (NOR)	(Decathlon–AG2R La Mondiale Development Team)
Jersey awarded to the youth classification winner	Youth	Jakob Söderqvist (SWE)	(Lidl–Trek)
Jersey awarded to the combativity classification winner	Combativity	Julius Johansen (DEN)	(Denmark)
	Team	(United States) Lidl–Trek	

The 2025 Danmark Rundt (officially PostNord Danmark Rundt 2025 for sponsorship reasons) is the 34th edition of the Danmark Rundt road cycling stage race, which is the part of the 2025 UCI ProSeries. It began on the 12th of August in Nexø and finished on the 16th of August in Silkeborg.

== Teams ==
Four UCI WorldTeams, seven UCI ProTeams, six UCI Continental teams and the Danish national team made up the eighteen teams that participate in the race.

UCI WorldTeams

- Alpecin–Deceuninck
- Lidl–Trek
- Team Picnic–PostNL
- Visma–Lease a Bike

UCI ProTeams

- Euskaltel–Euskadi
- Lotto
- Team Flanders–Baloise
- Team Novo Nordisk
- Team Polti VisitMalta
- Unibet Tietema Rockets
- Uno-X Mobility

UCI Continental Teams

- AIRTOX–Carl Ras
- BEAT Cycling Club
- BHS–PL Beton Bornholm
- Decathlon–AG2R La Mondiale Development Team
- Team ColoQuick
- Team Give Steel–2M Cycling Elite

National Teams

- Denmark

== Route ==
Stage characteristics and winners
Stage	Date	Course	Distance	Type	Stage winner
1	12 August	Nexø to Rønne	178.3 km (110.8 mi)	Hilly stage	Mads Pedersen (DEN)
2	13 August	Rødovre to Gladsaxe	110.5 km (68.7 mi)	Flat stage	Søren Wærenskjold (NOR)
3	14 August	Kerteminde to Kerteminde	14.3 km (8.9 mi)	Individual time trial	Jakob Söderqvist (SWE)
4	15 August	Svendborg to Vejle	226.9 km (141.0 mi)	Hilly stage	Mads Pedersen (DEN)
5	16 August	Hobro to Silkeborg	157.4 km (97.8 mi)	Hilly stage	Mads Pedersen (DEN)
Total			687.4 km (427.1 mi)		

== Stages ==
=== Stage 1 ===
12 August 2025 — Nexø to Rønne, 178.3 km (110.8 mi)

Stage 1 Result
Rank	Rider	Team	Time
1	Mads Pedersen (DEN)	Lidl–Trek	4h 03' 45"
2	Lukáš Kubiš (SVK)	Unibet Tietema Rockets	+ 0"
3	Conrad Haugsted (DEN)	Team ColoQuick	+ 0"
4	Niklas Larsen (DEN)	BHS–PL Beton Bornholm	+ 0"
5	William Blume Levy (DEN)	Uno-X Mobility	+ 0"
6	Magnus Bak Klaris (DEN)	AIRTOX–Carl Ras	+ 0"
7	Julius Johansen (DEN)	Denmark	+ 0"
8	Mattias Skjelmose (DEN)	Lidl–Trek	+ 2"
9	Victor Vercouille (BEL)	Team Flanders–Baloise	+ 5"
10	Henrik Pedersen (DEN)	Uno-X Mobility	+ 38"

General classification after Stage 1
Rank	Rider	Team	Time
1	Mads Pedersen (DEN)	Lidl–Trek	4h 03' 35"
2	Lukáš Kubiš (SVK)	Unibet Tietema Rockets	+ 4"
3	Conrad Haugsted (DEN)	Team ColoQuick	+ 5"
4	Julius Johansen (DEN)	Denmark	+ 8"
5	Niklas Larsen (DEN)	BHS–PL Beton Bornholm	+ 10"
6	William Blume Levy (DEN)	Uno-X Mobility	+ 10"
7	Magnus Bak Klaris (DEN)	AIRTOX–Carl Ras	+ 10"
8	Mattias Skjelmose (DEN)	Lidl–Trek	+ 12"
9	Victor Vercouille (BEL)	Team Flanders–Baloise	+ 15"
10	Henrik Pedersen (DEN)	Uno-X Mobility	+ 48"

=== Stage 2 ===
13 August 2025 — Rødovre to Gladsaxe, 110.5 km (68.7 mi)

Stage 2 Result
Rank	Rider	Team	Time
1	Søren Wærenskjold (NOR)	Uno-X Mobility	2h 09' 12"
2	Steffen De Schuyteneer (BEL)	Lotto	+ 0"
3	Axel Zingle (FRA)	Visma–Lease a Bike	+ 0"
4	Jasper Philipsen (BEL)	Alpecin–Deceuninck	+ 0"
5	Nils Eekhoff (NED)	Team Picnic–PostNL	+ 0"
6	Tom Crabbe (BEL)	Team Flanders–Baloise	+ 0"
7	Lukáš Kubiš (SVK)	Unibet Tietema Rockets	+ 0"
8	Stian Rosenlund (DEN)	AIRTOX–Carl Ras	+ 0"
9	Mads Pedersen (DEN)	Lidl–Trek	+ 0"
10	Mads Landbo (DEN)	Team Give Steel–2M Cycling Elite	+ 0"

General classification after Stage 2
Rank	Rider	Team	Time
1	Mads Pedersen (DEN)	Lidl–Trek	6h 12' 47"
2	Lukáš Kubiš (SVK)	Unibet Tietema Rockets	+ 4"
3	Conrad Haugsted (DEN)	Team ColoQuick	+ 5"
4	Niklas Larsen (DEN)	BHS–PL Beton Bornholm	+ 10"
5	William Blume Levy (DEN)	Uno-X Mobility	+ 10"
6	Victor Vercouille (BEL)	Team Flanders–Baloise	+ 15"
7	Steffen De Schuyteneer (BEL)	Lotto	+ 42"
8	Axel Zingle (FRA)	Visma–Lease a Bike	+ 44"
9	Nils Eekhoff (NED)	Team Picnic–PostNL	+ 48"
10	Mads Landbo (DEN)	Team Give Steel–2M Cycling Elite	+ 48"

=== Stage 3 ===
14 August 2025 — Kerteminde to Kerteminde, 14.3 km (8.9 mi) (ITT)

Stage 3 Result
Rank	Rider	Team	Time
1	Jakob Söderqvist (SWE)	Lidl–Trek	15' 28"
2	Alec Segaert (BEL)	Lotto	+ 5"
3	Mads Pedersen (DEN)	Lidl–Trek	+ 14"
4	Niklas Larsen (DEN)	BHS–PL Beton Bornholm	+ 14"
5	Johan Price-Pejtersen (DEN)	Alpecin–Deceuninck	+ 17"
6	Søren Wærenskjold (NOR)	Uno-X Mobility	+ 23"
7	Mattias Skjelmose (DEN)	Lidl–Trek	+ 24"
8	Søren Kragh Andersen (DEN)	Lidl–Trek	+ 26"
9	Mads Landbo (DEN)	Team Give Steel–2M Cycling Elite	+ 26"
10	Axel van der Tuuk (NED)	Euskaltel–Euskadi	+ 32"

General classification after Stage 3
Rank	Rider	Team	Time
1	Mads Pedersen (DEN)	Lidl–Trek	6h 28' 29"
2	Niklas Larsen (DEN)	BHS–PL Beton Bornholm	+ 10"
3	Jakob Söderqvist (SWE)	Lidl–Trek	+ 34"
4	Lukáš Kubiš (SVK)	Unibet Tietema Rockets	+ 35"
5	Alec Segaert (BEL)	Lotto	+ 39"
6	Conrad Haugsted (DEN)	Team ColoQuick	+ 48"
7	William Blume Levy (DEN)	Uno-X Mobility	+ 59"
8	Søren Kragh Andersen (DEN)	Lidl–Trek	+ 1' 01"
9	Mads Landbo (DEN)	Team Give Steel–2M Cycling Elite	+ 1' 01"
10	Victor Vercouillie (BEL)	Team Flanders–Baloise	+ 1' 01"

=== Stage 4 ===
15 August 2025 — Svendborg to Vejle, 226.9 km (141.0 mi)

Stage 4 Result
Rank	Rider	Team	Time
1	Mads Pedersen (DEN)	Lidl–Trek	5h 12' 26"
2	Tibor Del Grosso (NED)	Alpecin–Deceuninck	+ 31"
3	Antoine L'Hote (FRA)	Decathlon–AG2R La Mondiale Development Team	+ 32"
4	Morten Aalling Nørtoft (DEN)	Team ColoQuick	+ 32"
5	Matyáš Kopecký (CZE)	Team Novo Nordisk	+ 32"
6	Anders Foldager (DEN)	Denmark	+ 32"
7	Lukáš Kubiš (SVK)	Unibet Tietema Rockets	+ 32"
8	Dylan van Baarle (NED)	Visma–Lease a Bike	+ 35"
9	Jakob Söderqvist (SWE)	Lidl–Trek	+ 35"
10	Niklas Larsen (DEN)	BHS–PL Beton Bornholm	+ 35"

General classification after Stage 4
Rank	Rider	Team	Time
1	Mads Pedersen (DEN)	Lidl–Trek	11h 40' 42"
2	Niklas Larsen (DEN)	BHS–PL Beton Bornholm	+ 58"
3	Lukáš Kubiš (SVK)	Unibet Tietema Rockets	+ 1' 18"
4	Jakob Söderqvist (SWE)	Lidl–Trek	+ 1' 22"
5	Alec Segaert (BEL)	Lotto	+ 1' 27"
6	Søren Kragh Andersen (DEN)	Lidl–Trek	+ 1' 49"
7	Axel van der Tuuk (NED)	Euskaltel–Euskadi	+ 1' 55"
8	Mattias Skjelmose (DEN)	Lidl–Trek	+ 1' 59"
9	Tibor Del Grosso (NED)	Alpecin–Deceuninck	+ 2' 04"
10	Dylan van Baarle (NED)	Visma–Lease a Bike	+ 2' 06"

=== Stage 5 ===
16 August 2025 — Hobro to Silkeborg, 157.4 km (97.8 mi)

Stage 5 Result
Rank	Rider	Team	Time
1	Mads Pedersen (DEN)	Lidl–Trek	3h 27' 44"
2	Axel Zingle (FRA)	Visma–Lease a Bike	+ 0"
3	Jakob Söderqvist (SWE)	Lidl–Trek	+ 0"
4	Matyáš Kopecký (CZE)	Team Novo Nordisk	+ 0"
5	Søren Kragh Andersen (DEN)	Lidl–Trek	+ 5"
6	Mattias Skjelmose (DEN)	Lidl–Trek	+ 22"
7	Milan Menten (BEL)	Lotto	+ 22"
8	Axel van der Tuuk (NED)	Euskaltel–Euskadi	+ 22"
9	Mirco Maestri (ITA)	Team Polti VisitMalta	+ 22"
10	Carl-Frederik Bévort (DEN)	Uno-X Mobility	+ 22"

General classification after Stage 5
Rank	Rider	Team	Time
1	Mads Pedersen (DEN)	Lidl–Trek	15h 08' 16"
2	Jakob Söderqvist (SWE)	Lidl–Trek	+ 1' 28"
3	Niklas Larsen (DEN)	BHS–PL Beton Bornholm	+ 1' 30"
4	Lukáš Kubiš (SVK)	Unibet Tietema Rockets	+ 1' 50"
5	Alec Segaert (BEL)	Lotto	+ 1' 59"
6	Søren Kragh Andersen (DEN)	Lidl–Trek	+ 2' 04"
7	Axel van der Tuuk (NED)	Euskaltel–Euskadi	+ 2' 27"
8	Mattias Skjelmose (DEN)	Lidl–Trek	+ 2' 31"
9	Tibor Del Grosso (NED)	Alpecin–Deceuninck	+ 2' 34"
10	Matyáš Kopecký (CZE)	Team Novo Nordisk	+ 2' 36"

== Classification leadership table ==
Stage	Winner	General classification	Points classification	Mountains classification	Young rider classification	Active rider classification	Team classification
1	Mads Pedersen	Mads Pedersen	Mads Pedersen	Conrad Haugsted	Conrad Haugsted	Julius Johansen	Lidl–Trek
2	Søren Wærenskjold	Mads Pedersen	Mads Pedersen	Conrad Haugsted	Conrad Haugsted	Matias Malmberg	Lidl–Trek
3	Jakob Söderqvist	Mads Pedersen	Mads Pedersen	Conrad Haugsted	Jakob Söderqvist	not awarded	Lidl–Trek
4	Mads Pedersen	Mads Pedersen	Mads Pedersen	Matias Malmberg	Jakob Söderqvist	Mads Würtz Schmidt	Lidl–Trek
5	Mads Pedersen	Mads Pedersen	Mads Pedersen	Marius Innhaug Dahl	Jakob Söderqvist	Mads Andersen	Lidl–Trek
Final		Mads Pedersen	Mads Pedersen	Marius Innhaug Dahl	Jakob Söderqvist	Julius Johansen	Lidl–Trek

== Classification standings ==
Legend
Denotes the leader of the general classification	Denotes the leader of the young rider classification
Denotes the leader of the points classification	Denotes the leader of the active rider classification
Denotes the leader of the mountains classification	

=== General classification ===
Final general classification (1–10)
Rank	Rider	Team	Time
1	Mads Pedersen (DEN)	Lidl–Trek	15h 08' 16"
2	Jakob Söderqvist (SWE)	Lidl–Trek	+ 1' 28"
3	Niklas Larsen (DEN)	BHS–PL Beton Bornholm	+ 1' 30"
4	Lukáš Kubiš (SVK)	Unibet Tietema Rockets	+ 1' 50"
5	Alec Segaert (BEL)	Lotto	+ 1' 59"
6	Søren Kragh Andersen (DEN)	Lidl–Trek	+ 2' 04"
7	Axel van der Tuuk (NED)	Euskaltel–Euskadi	+ 2' 27"
8	Mattias Skjelmose (DEN)	Lidl–Trek	+ 2' 31"
9	Tibor Del Grosso (NED)	Alpecin–Deceuninck	+ 2' 34"
10	Matyáš Kopecký (CZE)	Team Novo Nordisk	+ 2' 36"

=== Points classification ===
Final points classification (1–10)
Rank	Rider	Team	Points
1	Mads Pedersen (DEN)	Lidl–Trek	54
2	Lukáš Kubiš (SVK)	Unibet Tietema Rockets	27
3	Axel Zingle (FRA)	Visma–Lease a Bike	23
4	Matyáš Kopecký (CZE)	Team Novo Nordisk	19
5	Søren Wærenskjold (NOR)	Uno-X Mobility	15
6	Jakob Söderqvist (SWE)	Lidl–Trek	14
7	Tibor Del Grosso (NED)	Alpecin–Deceuninck	14
8	Niklas Larsen (DEN)	BHS–PL Beton Bornholm	12
9	Mattias Skjelmose (DEN)	Lidl–Trek	12
10	Steffen De Schuyteneer (BEL)	Lotto	12

=== Mountains classification ===
Final mountains classification (1–10)
Rank	Rider	Team	Points
1	Marius Innhaug Dahl (NOR)	Decathlon–AG2R La Mondiale Development Team	70
2	Conrad Haugsted (DEN)	Team ColoQuick	44
3	Matias Malmberg (DEN)	AIRTOX–Carl Ras	34
4	Mads Würtz Schmidt (DEN)	Denmark	26
5	Daniel Weis Nielsen (DEN)	Decathlon–AG2R La Mondiale Development Team	24
6	Julius Johansen (DEN)	Denmark	12
7	Victor Vercouille (BEL)	Team Flanders–Baloise	12
8	Filippo Ridolfo (ITA)	Team Novo Nordisk	10
9	Stian Rosenlund (DEN)	AIRTOX–Carl Ras	8
10	Emil Toudal (DEN)	Team ColoQuick	8

=== Young rider classification ===
Final young rider classification (1–10)
Rank	Rider	Team	Time
1	Jakob Söderqvist (SWE)	Lidl–Trek	15h 09' 44"
2	Alec Segaert (BEL)	Lotto	+ 31"
3	Matyáš Kopecký (CZE)	Team Novo Nordisk	+ 1' 06"
4	Tibor Del Grosso (NED)	Alpecin–Deceuninck	+ 1' 08"
5	Carl-Fredrik Bévort (DEN)	Uno-X Mobility	+ 1' 05"
6	Kasper Haugland (NOR)	Decathlon–AG2R La Mondiale Development Team	+ 1' 30"
7	Arthur Blaise (FRA)	Decathlon–AG2R La Mondiale Development Team	+ 1' 41"
8	Antoine L'Hote (FRA)	Decathlon–AG2R La Mondiale Development Team	+ 3' 39"
9	Steffen De Schuyteneer (BEL)	Lotto	+ 7' 33"
10	Pietro Mattio (ITA)	Visma–Lease a Bike	+ 8' 38"

=== Active rider classification ===
Final active rider classification(1–10)
Rank	Rider	Team	Points
1	Julius Johansen (DEN)	Denmark	12
2	Mads Würtz Schmidt (DEN)	Denmark	12
3	Mads Andersen (DEN)	AIRTOX–Carl Ras	12
4	Matias Malmberg (DEN)	AIRTOX–Carl Ras	12
5	Sebastian Nielsen (DEN)	Unibet Tietema Rockets	8
6	Jakob Fuglsang (DEN)	Denmark	8
7	Stian Rosenlund (DEN)	AIRTOX–Carl Ras	8
8	Rasmus Bøgh Wallin (DEN)	Uno-X Mobility	4
9	Filippo Ridolfo (ITA)	Team Novo Nordisk	4
10	Conrad Haugsted (DEN)	Team ColoQuick	4

=== Team classification ===
Final team classification (1–10)
Rank	Team	Time
1	(United States) Lidl–Trek	45h 27' 42"
2	(France) Decathlon–AG2R La Mondiale Development Team	+ 5' 08"
3	(France) Unibet Tietema Rockets	+ 5' 28"
4	Denmark	+ 7' 41"
5	(Belgium) Lotto	+ 8' 56"
6	(Belgium) Team Flanders–Baloise	+ 11' 55"
7	(Netherlands) Visma–Lease a Bike	+ 12' 59"
8	(Belgium) Alpecin–Deceuninck	+ 16' 07"
9	(Denmark) Team ColoQuick	+ 16' 46"
10	(Spain) Euskaltel–Euskadi	+ 18' 57"
