= 2021 UCI Road World Championships – Men's under-23 road race =

Men's under-23 road race
2021 UCI Road World Championships

Race details
- Dates: 24 September 2021
- Stages: 1
- Distance: 160.9 km (100.0 mi)
- Winning time: 3h 37' 36"

Medalists
	Gold	(Italy) Filippo Baroncini (ITA)
	Silver	(Eritrea) Biniam Girmay (ERI)
	Bronze	(Netherlands) Olav Kooij (NED)

The Men's under-23 road race of the 2021 UCI Road World Championships was a cycling event that took place on 24 September 2021 from Antwerp to Leuven, Belgium. It was the 25th edition of the event. The race was won by Italian rider Filippo Baroncini, finishing two seconds ahead of the bunch sprint for silver, won by Biniam Girmay of Eritrea.

American rider Luke Lamperti originally finished 10th, but was disqualified after the race by the UCI jury after allegedly causing a Belgian rider to crash earlier in the race.

== Final classification ==
Of the race's 177 entrants, 143 riders completed the full distance of 160.9 kilometres (100.0 mi).

Rank	Rider	Country	Time
1	Filippo Baroncini	Italy	3h 37' 36"
2	Biniam Girmay	Eritrea	+ 2"
3	Olav Kooij	Netherlands	+ 2"
4	Michele Gazzoli	Italy	+ 2"
5	Lewis Askey	Great Britain	+ 2"
6	Thibau Nys	Belgium	+ 2"
7	Luca Colnaghi	Italy	+ 2"
8	Paul Penhoët	France	+ 2"
9	Vinicius Rangel Costa	Brazil	+ 2"
10	Tobias Bayer	Austria	+ 2"
11	Pavel Bittner	Czech Republic	+ 2"
12	Petr Kelemen	Czech Republic	+ 2"
13	Samuel Watson	Great Britain	+ 2"
14	Niklas Märkl	Germany	+ 2"
15	Fabio Christen	Switzerland	+ 2"
16	Sebastian Changizi	Denmark	+ 2"
17	Filippo Zana	Italy	+ 2"
18	Corbin Strong	New Zealand	+ 2"
19	Alexis Renard	France	+ 2"
20	Fábio Costa	Portugal	+ 2"
21	Cedric Pries	Luxembourg	+ 2"
22	Alexandre Balmer	Switzerland	+ 2"
23	Jarrad Drizners	Australia	+ 2"
24	Matúš Štoček	Slovakia	+ 2"
25	Maksym Bilyi	Ukraine	+ 2"
26	Mats Wenzel	Luxembourg	+ 2"
27	Mauro Schmid	Switzerland	+ 2"
28	Yevgeniy Fedorov	Kazakhstan	+ 2"
29	Pirmin Benz	Germany	+ 2"
30	Antoine Raugel	France	+ 2"
31	Antti-Jussi Juntunen	Finland	+ 2"
32	Pedro Miguel Lopes	Portugal	+ 2"
33	Mathias Larsen	Denmark	+ 2"
34	Matis Louvel	France	+ 12"
35	Nurbergen Nurlykhassym	Kazakhstan	+ 12"
36	Matthew Riccitello	United States	+ 15"
37	Michel Hessmann	Germany	+ 15"
38	Tim Torn Teutenberg	Germany	+ 15"
39	Tom Lindner	Germany	+ 15"
40	Erik Fetter	Hungary	+ 17"
41	Kevin Vermaerke	United States	+ 20"
42	Mick van Dijke	Portugal	+ 28"
43	Arthur Kluckers	Luxembourg	+ 35"
44	Kevin Vauquelin	France	+ 53"
45	Tomáš Kopecký	Czech Republic	+ 53"
46	Casper van Uden	Netherlands	+ 1' 26"
47	Renus Byiza Uhiriwe	Rwanda	+ 1' 26"
48	Tim van Dijke	Netherlands	+ 1' 26"
49	Yaroslav Parashchak	Ukraine	+ 1' 26"
50	Florian Vermeersch	Belgium	+ 1' 30"
51	Hugo Page	France	+ 1' 30"
52	Santiago Buitrago	Colombia	+ 1' 37"
53	Paul Daumont	Burkina Faso	+ 2' 28"
54	Reuben Thompson	New Zealand	+ 2' 28"
55	Viktor Potočki	Croatia	+ 2' 41"
56	Ádám Kristóf Karl	Hungary	+ 2' 41"
57	Luca Coati	Italy	+ 2' 41"
58	Daan Hoole	Netherlands	+ 2' 41"
59	Marijn van den Berg	Netherlands	+ 2' 41"
60	Henok Mulubrhan	Eritrea	+ 2' 41"
61	Anders Halland Johannessen	Norway	+ 2' 41"
62	Jakub Ťoupalík	Czech Republic	+ 2' 41"
63	Tord Gudmestad	Norway	+ 2' 41"
64	Matevž Govekar	Slovenia	+ 2' 59"
65	Joonas Kurits	Estonia	+ 3' 32"
66	Thanakhan Chaiyasombat	Thailand	+ 4' 28"
67	Harold López	Ecuador	+ 4' 28"
68	Nicolas Vinokurov	Kazakhstan	+ 4' 28"
69	Lukáš Kubiš	Slovakia	+ 4' 28"
70	Gleb Brussenskiy	Kazakhstan	+ 4' 30"
71	Fran Miholjević	Croatia	+ 4' 30"
72	Filip Maciejuk	Poland	+ 4' 30"
73	Robert Donaldson	Great Britain	+ 4' 30"
74	Xabier Azparren	Spain	+ 4' 30"
75	Rait Ärm	Estonia	+ 4' 30"
76	Raphael Parisella	Canada	+ 6' 20"
77	Marco Frigo	Italy	+ 6' 20"
78	Stan Van Tricht	Belgium	+ 6' 20"
79	Idar Andersen	Norway	+ 6' 20"
80	William Blume Levy	Denmark	+ 6' 20"
81	Juan Esteban Guerrero	Colombia	+ 6' 20"
82	Natnael Tesfatsion	Eritrea	+ 6' 20"
83	Tobias Halland Johannessen	Norway	+ 6' 20"
84	Fabio Van den Bossche	Belgium	+ 7' 28"
85	Finn Fisher-Black	New Zealand	+ 8' 55"
86	Dillon Corkery	Ireland	+ 9' 16"
87	Jacob Eriksson	Sweden	+ 9' 16"

Rank	Rider	Country	Time
88	Jorge Peyrot	Mexico	+ 9' 40"
89	Alekss Krasts	Latvia	+ 9' 40"
90	Carlos Salgueiro	Portugal	+ 9' 43"
91	Aivaras Mikutis	Lithuania	+ 9' 43"
92	Efrem Gebrehiwet	Eritrea	+ 9' 43"
93	Ruben Eggenberg	Switzerland	+ 9' 43"
94	Savva Novikov	Russia	+ 9' 43"
95	Logan Currie	New Zealand	+ 9' 46"
96	Alastair Mackellar	Australia	+ 9' 46"
97	Kaden Hopkins	Bermuda	+ 10' 16"
98	Andrei Stepanov	Russia	+ 10' 16"
99	Petros Mengs	Eritrea	+ 10' 16"
100	Ben Healy	Ireland	+ 10' 21"
101	Danil Evdokimov	Uzbekistan	+ 11' 35"
102	Heberth Alejandro Gutiérrez	Colombia	+ 11' 35"
103	Jensen Plowright	Australia	+ 11' 35"
104	Nicholas Narraway	Bermuda	+ 11' 36"
105	Mikel Demiri	Albania	+ 11' 36"
106	Tobias Vančo	Slovakia	+ 11' 39"
107	Erik Bergström Frisk	Sweden	+ 11' 39"
108	Oussama Cheblaoui	Algeria	+ 11' 39"
109	Ethan Vernon	Great Britain	+ 11' 39"
110	Oliver Stockwell	Great Britain	+ 11' 39"
111	Alexandr Semenov	Kazakhstan	+ 11' 39"
112	Joel Fuertes	Ecuador	+ 11' 39"
113	Adam Ward	Ireland	+ 12' 33"
114	Travis Stedman	South Africa	+ 12' 33"
115	Mantas Januškevičius	Lithuania	+ 12' 33"
116	Denys Khotulov	Ukraine	+ 12' 33"
117	Jesús David Peña	Colombia	+ 12' 33"
118	Ratchanon Yaowarat	Thailand	+ 12' 33"
119	Aleksandr Bereznyak	Russia	+ 12' 33"
120	Jason Oosthuizen	South Africa	+ 12' 33"
121	Alex Vogel	Switzerland	+ 12' 33"
122	Maurice Ballerstedt	Germany	+ 12' 54"
123	Aleksey Fomovskiy	Uzbekistan	+ 14' 11"
124	Thomas Silva	Uruguay	+ 14' 36"
125	Ivan Yatsenko	Russia	+ 14' 36"
126	José Autran	Chile	+ 14' 36"
127	Nixon Efrain Rosero	Ecuador	+ 14' 36"
128	Pau Miquel	Spain	+ 14' 36"
129	Pauls Rubenis	Latvia	+ 14' 36"
130	Daniil Nikulin	Ukraine	+ 14' 36"
131	Tom Paquet	Luxembourg	+ 14' 36"
132	Roi Weinberg	Israel	+ 14' 36"
133	Rokas Kmieliauskas	Lithuania	+ 14' 36"
134	Kristers Ansons	Latvia	+ 14' 39"
135	Travis Barrett	South Africa	+ 16' 11"
136	Conor White	Bermuda	+ 16' 19"
137	Muhammadhanafee Kueji	Thailand	+ 16' 19"
138	Jose Manuel Aramayo	Bolivia	+ 16' 19"
139	Achraf Ed Doghmy	Morocco	+ 16' 19"
140	Daniel Babor	Czech Republic	+ 16' 19"
141	Sergei Kurianov	Russia	+ 16' 19"
142	Žygimantas Matuzevičius	Lithuania	+ 16' 19"
143	Aymen Merdj	Algeria	+ 18' 12"
	Juan Ayuso	Spain	DNF
	Nikita Stenkovoy	Uzbekistan	DNF
	Marc Brustenga	Spain	DNF
	Nicolás David Gómez	Colombia	DNF
	Gleb Karpenko	Estonia	DNF
	Magnus Sheffield	United States	DNF
	Arnaud De Lie	Belgium	DNF
	Sean Quinn	United States	DNF
	Søren Wærenskjold	Norway	DNF
	Victor Ocampo	Colombia	DNF
	Raúl García Pierna	Spain	DNF
	Jacob Hindsgaul Madsen	Denmark	DNF
	Lennert Van Eetvelt	Belgium	DNF
	Marcus Sander Hansen	Denmark	DNF
	Marc Pritzen	South Africa	DNF
	Filip Lohinský	Slovakia	DNF
	Artjom Mirzojev	Estonia	DNF
	Roberto José Herrera	Panama	DNF
	Martin Urianstad	Norway	DNF
	Jesus Roniel Marte	Dominican Republic	DNF
	Hugo Forssell	Sweden	DNF
	Adam Foltán	Slovakia	DNF
	Richard Huera	Ecuador	DNF
	Kristinn Jónsson	Iceland	DNF
	Jack Drage	New Zealand	DNF
	Bachirou Nikiema	Burkina Faso	DNF
	Alejandro Hernández	Cuba	DNF
	Linus Kvist	Sweden	DNF
	Vincent Mouni	Burkina Faso	DNF
	Mohamed Amine Nehari	Algeria	DNF
	Luke Lamperti	United States	DSQ
