= 2024 CRO Race =

2024 UCI Europe Tour

Race details
- Dates: 1–6 October 2024
- Stages: 6
- Distance: 916 km (569.2 mi)
- Winning time: 17h 23' 53"

Results
Jersey awarded to the overall winner	Winner	Brandon McNulty (USA)	(UAE Team Emirates)
	Second	Tobias Lund Andresen (DEN)	(Team dsm–firmenich PostNL)
	Third	Fred Wright (GBR)	(Team Bahrain Victorious)
Jersey awarded to the points classification winner	Points	Tobias Lund Andresen (DEN)	(Team dsm–firmenich PostNL)
Jersey awarded to the mountains classification winner	Mountains	Axel van der Tuuk (NED)	(Metec–Solarwatt p/b Mantel)
Jersey awarded to the youth classification winner	Youth	Tobias Lund Andresen (DEN)	(Team dsm–firmenich PostNL)
	Team	(Netherlands) Team dsm–firmenich PostNL	

The 2024 CRO Race was a road cycling stage race in Croatia that was held between 1 October and 6 October 2024. It was the ninth edition of the Tour of Croatia since its revival in 2015 and the fifth under the CRO Race name. The race was rated as a category 2.1 event on the 2024 UCI Europe Tour calendar.

== Teams ==
Six UCI WorldTeams, eight UCI ProTeams, and six UCI Continental teams made up the 20 teams that participated in the race.

UCI WorldTeams

- Team Bahrain Victorious
- Ineos Grenadiers
- Red Bull–Bora–Hansgrohe
- Team dsm–firmenich PostNL
- Team Jayco–AlUla
- UAE Team Emirates

UCI ProTeams

- Caja Rural–Seguros RGA
- Equipo Kern Pharma
- Israel–Premier Tech
- Polti–Kometa
- Q36.5 Pro Cycling Team
- TDT–Unibet Cycling Team
- Tudor Pro Cycling Team
- Uno-X Mobility

UCI Continental Teams

- Adria Mobil
- ATT Investments
- Ljubljana Gusto Santic
- Mazowsze Serce Polski
- Metec–Solarwatt p/b Mantel
- Santic–Wibatech

== Route ==
Stage characteristics and winners
Stage	Date	Course	Distance	Type	Winner
1	1 October	Vodice to Sinj	162.5 km (101.0 mi)	Hilly stage	Alexander Kristoff (NOR)
2	2 October	Biograd na Moru to Novalja	114.5 km (71.1 mi)	Flat stage	Juan Sebastián Molano (COL)
3	3 October	Novi Vinodolski to Opatija (Note: Original start of the stage was in Otočac but due to strong wind at the section from Senj to Novi Vinodolski and road closure for the big vehicles and motorcycles, the start point was moved to Novi Vinodolski at km 64.5 at 13:40 without a neutral zone.)	89.5 km (55.6 mi)	Hilly stage	Brandon McNulty (USA)
4	4 October	Krk to Labin	160.5 km (99.7 mi)	Mountain stage	Tobias Lund Andresen (DEN)
5	5 October	Ozalj to Karlovac	100.5 km (62.4 mi)	Hilly stage	Alexander Kristoff (NOR)
6	6 October	Sveta Nedelja to Zagreb	157.5 km (97.9 mi)	Flat stage	Oded Kogut (ISR)
Total			916 km (569 mi)		

== Stages ==
=== Stage 1 ===
1 October 2024 — Vodice to Sinj, 162.5 km (101.0 mi)

Stage 1 Result
Rank	Rider	Team	Time
1	Alexander Kristoff (NOR)	Uno-X Mobility	3h 53' 02"
2	Giovanni Lonardi (ITA)	Polti–Kometa	+ 0"
3	Alberto Bruttomesso (ITA)	Team Bahrain Victorious	+ 0"
4	Anders Foldager (DEN)	Team Jayco–AlUla	+ 0"
5	Elia Viviani (ITA)	Ineos Grenadiers	+ 0"
6	Oded Kogut (ISR)	Israel–Premier Tech	+ 0"
7	Jordy Bouts (BEL)	TDT–Unibet Cycling Team	+ 0"
8	Sam Welsford (AUS)	Red Bull–Bora–Hansgrohe	+ 0"
9	Javier Serrano (ESP)	Polti–Kometa	+ 0"
10	Marcin Budziński (POL)	Mazowsze Serce Polski	+ 0"

General classification after Stage 1
Rank	Rider	Team	Time
1	Alexander Kristoff (NOR)	Uno-X Mobility	3h 52' 52"
2	Giovanni Lonardi (ITA)	Polti–Kometa	+ 4"
3	Cyrus Monk (AUS)	Q36.5 Pro Cycling Team	+ 4"
4	Alberto Bruttomesso (ITA)	Team Bahrain Victorious	+ 6"
5	Axel van der Tuuk (NED)	Metec–Solarwatt p/b Mantel	+ 6"
6	Fred Wright (GBR)	Team Bahrain Victorious	+ 7"
7	Jordy Bouts (BEL)	TDT–Unibet Cycling Team	+ 8"
8	Luc Wirtgen (LUX)	Tudor Pro Cycling Team	+ 9"
9	Jokin Murguialday (ESP)	Caja Rural–Seguros RGA	+ 9"
10	Anders Foldager (DEN)	Team Jayco–AlUla	+ 10"

=== Stage 2 ===
2 October 2024 — Biograd na Moru to Novalja, 114.5 km (71.1 mi)

Stage 2 Result
Rank	Rider	Team	Time
1	Juan Sebastián Molano (COL)	UAE Team Emirates	2h 16' 19"
2	Giovanni Lonardi (ITA)	Polti–Kometa	+ 0"
3	Sam Welsford (AUS)	Red Bull–Bora–Hansgrohe	+ 0"
4	Nicolò Buratti (ITA)	Team Bahrain Victorious	+ 0"
5	Alexander Kristoff (NOR)	Uno-X Mobility	+ 0"
6	Pavel Bittner (CZE)	Team dsm–firmenich PostNL	+ 0"
7	Edoardo Zambanini (ITA)	Team Bahrain Victorious	+ 0"
8	Mirco Maestri (ITA)	Polti–Kometa	+ 0"
9	Javier Serrano (ESP)	Polti–Kometa	+ 0"
10	Ben Turner (GBR)	Ineos Grenadiers	+ 0"

General classification after Stage 2
Rank	Rider	Team	Time
1	Giovanni Lonardi (ITA)	Polti–Kometa	6h 09' 09"
2	Alexander Kristoff (NOR)	Uno-X Mobility	+ 2"
3	Cyrus Monk (AUS)	Q36.5 Pro Cycling Team	+ 6"
4	Sam Welsford (AUS)	Red Bull–Bora–Hansgrohe	+ 8"
5	Alberto Bruttomesso (ITA)	Team Bahrain Victorious	+ 8"
6	Fred Wright (GBR)	Team Bahrain Victorious	+ 8"
7	Pavel Bittner (CZE)	Team dsm–firmenich PostNL	+ 9"
8	Nicolas Gojković (CRO)	Adria Mobil	+ 9"
9	Jordy Bouts (BEL)	TDT–Unibet Cycling Team	+ 10"
10	Tobias Lund Andresen (DEN)	Team dsm–firmenich PostNL	+ 10"

=== Stage 3 ===
3 October 2024 — Novi Vinodolski to Opatija, 89.5 km (55.6 mi)

Stage 3 Result
Rank	Rider	Team	Time
1	Brandon McNulty (USA)	UAE Team Emirates	1h 47' 23"
2	Igor Arrieta (ESP)	UAE Team Emirates	+ 34"
3	Tobias Lund Andresen (DEN)	Team dsm–firmenich PostNL	+ 34"
4	Filippo Ganna (ITA)	Ineos Grenadiers	+ 34"
5	Sakarias Koller Løland (NOR)	Uno-X Mobility	+ 34"
6	Mirco Maestri (ITA)	Polti–Kometa	+ 34"
7	Pier-André Côté (CAN)	Israel–Premier Tech	+ 34"
8	Warren Barguil (FRA)	Team dsm–firmenich PostNL	+ 34"
9	Pablo Castrillo (ESP)	Equipo Kern Pharma	+ 34"
10	Kim Heiduk (GER)	Ineos Grenadiers	+ 34"

General classification after Stage 3
Rank	Rider	Team	Time
1	Brandon McNulty (USA)	UAE Team Emirates	7h 56' 41"
2	Giovanni Lonardi (ITA)	Polti–Kometa	+ 25"
3	Cyrus Monk (AUS)	Q36.5 Pro Cycling Team	+ 31"
4	Fred Wright (GBR)	Team Bahrain Victorious	+ 33"
5	Tobias Lund Andresen (DEN)	Team dsm–firmenich PostNL	+ 35"
6	Kim Heiduk (GER)	Ineos Grenadiers	+ 35"
7	Anders Foldager (DEN)	Team Jayco–AlUla	+ 36"
8	Nicolò Buratti (ITA)	Team Bahrain Victorious	+ 37"
9	Ben Turner (GBR)	Ineos Grenadiers	+ 37"
10	Marcin Budziński (POL)	Mazowsze Serce Polski	+ 37"

=== Stage 4 ===
4 October 2024 — Krk to Labin, 160.5 km (99.7 mi)

Stage 4 Result
Rank	Rider	Team	Time
1	Tobias Lund Andresen (DEN)	Team dsm–firmenich PostNL	3h 58' 38"
2	Edoardo Zambanini (ITA)	Team Bahrain Victorious	+ 0"
3	Odd Christian Eiking (NOR)	Uno-X Mobility	+ 3"
4	Fred Wright (GBR)	Team Bahrain Victorious	+ 3"
5	Pablo Castrillo (ESP)	Equipo Kern Pharma	+ 3"
6	Pier-André Côté (CAN)	Israel–Premier Tech	+ 3"
7	Brandon McNulty (USA)	UAE Team Emirates	+ 3"
8	Warren Barguil (FRA)	Team dsm–firmenich PostNL	+ 3"
9	Frederik Wandahl (DEN)	Red Bull–Bora–Hansgrohe	+ 3"
10	Anders Foldager (DEN)	Team Jayco–AlUla	+ 3"

General classification after Stage 4
Rank	Rider	Team	Time
1	Brandon McNulty (USA)	UAE Team Emirates	11h 55' 19"
2	Tobias Lund Andresen (DEN)	Team dsm–firmenich PostNL	+ 25"
3	Edoardo Zambanini (ITA)	Team Bahrain Victorious	+ 31"
4	Fred Wright (GBR)	Team Bahrain Victorious	+ 33"
5	Anders Foldager (DEN)	Team Jayco–AlUla	+ 39"
6	Pier-André Côté (CAN)	Israel–Premier Tech	+ 40"
7	Pablo Castrillo (ESP)	Equipo Kern Pharma	+ 40"
8	Frederik Wandahl (DEN)	Red Bull–Bora–Hansgrohe	+ 40"
9	Warren Barguil (FRA)	Team dsm–firmenich PostNL	+ 40"
10	Mattia Bais (ITA)	Polti–Kometa	+ 44"

=== Stage 5 ===
5 October 2024 — Ozalj to Karlovac, 100.5 km (62.4 mi)

Stage 5 Result
Rank	Rider	Team	Time
1	Alexander Kristoff (NOR)	Uno-X Mobility	2h 12' 24"
2	Oded Kogut (ISR)	Israel–Premier Tech	+ 0"
3	Giovanni Lonardi (ITA)	Polti–Kometa	+ 0"
4	Tobias Lund Andresen (DEN)	Team dsm–firmenich PostNL	+ 0"
5	Ben Turner (GBR)	Ineos Grenadiers	+ 0"
6	Tord Gudmestad (NOR)	Uno-X Mobility	+ 0"
7	Mirco Maestri (ITA)	Polti–Kometa	+ 0"
8	Sam Welsford (AUS)	Red Bull–Bora–Hansgrohe	+ 0"
9	Campbell Stewart (NZL)	Team Jayco–AlUla	+ 0"
10	Alberto Bruttomesso (ITA)	Team Bahrain Victorious	+ 0"

General classification after Stage 5
Rank	Rider	Team	Time
1	Brandon McNulty (USA)	UAE Team Emirates	14h 07' 46"
2	Tobias Lund Andresen (DEN)	Team dsm–firmenich PostNL	+ 14"
3	Edoardo Zambanini (ITA)	Team Bahrain Victorious	+ 28"
4	Fred Wright (GBR)	Team Bahrain Victorious	+ 28"
5	Anders Foldager (DEN)	Team Jayco–AlUla	+ 35"
6	Pier-André Côté (CAN)	Israel–Premier Tech	+ 37"
7	Pablo Castrillo (ESP)	Equipo Kern Pharma	+ 37"
8	Warren Barguil (FRA)	Team dsm–firmenich PostNL	+ 37"
9	Frederik Wandahl (DEN)	Red Bull–Bora–Hansgrohe	+ 37"
10	Mattia Bais (ITA)	Polti–Kometa	+ 41"

=== Stage 6 ===
6 October 2024 — Sveta Nedelja to Zagreb, 157.5 km (97.9 mi)

Stage 6 Result
Rank	Rider	Team	Time
1	Oded Kogut (ISR)	Israel–Premier Tech	3h 16' 07"
2	Alexander Kristoff (NOR)	Uno-X Mobility	+ 0"
3	Tord Gudmestad (NOR)	Uno-X Mobility	+ 0"
4	Ben Turner (GBR)	Ineos Grenadiers	+ 0"
5	Alberto Bruttomesso (ITA)	Team Bahrain Victorious	+ 0"
6	Orluis Aular (VEN)	Caja Rural–Seguros RGA	+ 0"
7	Jakub Kaczmarek (POL)	Mazowsze Serce Polski	+ 0"
8	Juan Sebastián Molano (COL)	UAE Team Emirates	+ 0"
9	Sam Welsford (AUS)	Red Bull–Bora–Hansgrohe	+ 0"
10	Robin Froidevaux (SUI)	Tudor Pro Cycling Team	+ 0"

General classification after Stage 6
Rank	Rider	Team	Time
1	Brandon McNulty (USA)	UAE Team Emirates	17h 23' 53"
2	Tobias Lund Andresen (DEN)	Team dsm–firmenich PostNL	+ 8"
3	Fred Wright (GBR)	Team Bahrain Victorious	+ 27"
4	Edoardo Zambanini (ITA)	Team Bahrain Victorious	+ 28"
5	Pier-André Côté (CAN)	Israel–Premier Tech	+ 34"
6	Anders Foldager (DEN)	Team Jayco–AlUla	+ 35"
7	Pablo Castrillo (ESP)	Equipo Kern Pharma	+ 37"
8	Warren Barguil (FRA)	Team dsm–firmenich PostNL	+ 37"
9	Frederik Wandahl (DEN)	Red Bull–Bora–Hansgrohe	+ 37"
10	Mattia Bais (ITA)	Polti–Kometa	+ 41"

== Classification leadership table ==
In the 2024 CRO Race, four different jerseys were awarded. The general classification was calculated by adding each cyclist's finishing times on each stage, and applying time bonuses for the first three riders at intermediate sprints (three seconds to first, two seconds to second, and one second to third) and at the finish of mass-start stages; these were awarded to the first three finishers on all stages: the stage winner won a ten-second bonus, with six and four seconds for the second and third riders, respectively. The leader of the classification received a red jersey; it was considered the most important of the 2023 CRO Race, and the winner of the classification was considered the winner of the race.

Points for the mountains classification
Position	1	2	3	4	5	6	7	8
Points for Hors-category	20	15	10	8	6	4	3	2
Points for Category 1	12	8	6	4	2	0		
Points for Category 2	6	4	2	0				
Points for Category 3	3	2	1	0				

Additionally, there was a points classification, for which the leader was awarded a blue jersey. In the points classification, cyclists received points for finishing in the top 15 of each stage. For winning a stage, a rider earned 25 points, with 20 for second, 16 for third, 14 for fourth, 12 for fifth, 10 for sixth, and a point fewer per place down to 1 point for 15th place. Points towards the classification could also be won on a 5–3–1 scale for the first three riders, respectively, at intermediate sprint points during each stage; these intermediate sprints also offered bonus seconds towards the general classification as noted above.

There was also a mountains classification, the leadership of which was marked by a green jersey. In the mountains classification, points towards the classification were won by reaching the summit of a climb before other cyclists. Each climb was marked as either hors, first, second, or third-category, with more points available for the higher-categorized climbs.

The fourth and final jersey represented the young rider classification, and its leadership was marked by a white jersey. This was decided in the same way as the general classification, but only riders born after 1 January 2001 (i.e., under 23 years of age at the beginning of the year) were eligible to be ranked in the classification. There was also a team classification, in which the times of the best three cyclists per team on each stage were added together; the leading team at the end of the race was the team with the lowest total time.

Classification leadership by stage
Stage	Winner	General classification	Points classification	Mountains classification	Young rider classification	Team classification
1	Alexander Kristoff	Alexander Kristoff	Alexander Kristoff	Axel van der Tuuk	Alberto Bruttomesso	Team Bahrain Victorious
2	Juan Sebastián Molano	Giovanni Lonardi	Giovanni Lonardi	Axel van der Tuuk	Alberto Bruttomesso	Team Bahrain Victorious
3	Brandon McNulty	Brandon McNulty	Giovanni Lonardi	Axel van der Tuuk	Tobias Lund Andresen	Team Bahrain Victorious
4	Tobias Lund Andresen	Brandon McNulty	Brandon McNulty	Axel van der Tuuk	Tobias Lund Andresen	Team dsm–firmenich PostNL
5	Alexander Kristoff	Brandon McNulty	Tobias Lund Andresen	Axel van der Tuuk	Tobias Lund Andresen	Team dsm–firmenich PostNL
6	Oded Kogut	Brandon McNulty	Tobias Lund Andresen	Axel van der Tuuk	Tobias Lund Andresen	Team dsm–firmenich PostNL
Final		Brandon McNulty	Tobias Lund Andresen	Axel van der Tuuk	Tobias Lund Andresen	Team dsm–firmenich PostNL

- On stage 2, Giovanni Lonardi, who was second in the points classification, wore the blue jersey, because first-placed Alexander Kristoff wore the red jersey as the leader of the general classification.
- On stage 3, Alexander Kristoff, who was second in the points classification, will wear the blue jersey, because first-placed Giovanni Lonardi will wear the red jersey as the leader of the general classification.

== Classification standings ==
Legend
Denotes the winner of the general classification	Denotes the winner of the mountains classification
Denotes the winner of the points classification	Denotes the winner of the young rider classification

=== General classification ===
Final general classification (1–10)
Rank	Rider	Team	Time
1	Brandon McNulty (USA)	UAE Team Emirates	17h 23' 53"
2	Tobias Lund Andresen (DEN)	Team dsm–firmenich PostNL	+ 8"
3	Fred Wright (GBR)	Team Bahrain Victorious	+ 27"
4	Edoardo Zambanini (ITA)	Team Bahrain Victorious	+ 28"
5	Pier-André Côté (CAN)	Israel–Premier Tech	+ 34"
6	Anders Foldager (DEN)	Team Jayco–AlUla	+ 35"
7	Pablo Castrillo (ESP)	Equipo Kern Pharma	+ 37"
8	Warren Barguil (FRA)	Team dsm–firmenich PostNL	+ 37"
9	Frederik Wandahl (DEN)	Red Bull–Bora–Hansgrohe	+ 37"
10	Mattia Bais (ITA)	Polti–Kometa	+ 41"

=== Points classification ===
Final points classification (1–10)
Rank	Rider	Team	Points
1	Tobias Lund Andresen (DEN)	Team dsm–firmenich PostNL	84
2	Giovanni Lonardi (ITA)	Polti–Kometa	57
3	Oded Kogut (ISR)	Israel–Premier Tech	55
4	Juan Sebastián Molano (COL)	UAE Team Emirates	48
5	Alexander Kristoff (NOR)	Uno-X Mobility	45
6	Brandon McNulty (USA)	UAE Team Emirates	44
7	Ben Turner (GBR)	Ineos Grenadiers	38
8	Alberto Bruttomesso (ITA)	Team Bahrain Victorious	34
9	Fred Wright (GBR)	Team Bahrain Victorious	29
10	Edoardo Zambanini (ITA)	Team Bahrain Victorious	29

=== Mountains classification ===
Final mountains classification (1–10)
Rank	Rider	Team	Points
1	Axel van der Tuuk (NED)	Metec–Solarwatt p/b Mantel	29
2	Robert Stannard (AUS)	Team Bahrain Victorious	20
3	Andreas Leknessund (NOR)	Uno-X Mobility	15
4	Edoardo Zambanini (ITA)	Team Bahrain Victorious	10
5	Hugo Aznar (ESP)	Equipo Kern Pharma	10
6	Jokin Murguialday (ESP)	Caja Rural–Seguros RGA	10
7	Casper van der Woude (NED)	Metec–Solarwatt p/b Mantel	9
8	Brandon McNulty (USA)	UAE Team Emirates	8
9	Warren Barguil (FRA)	Team dsm–firmenich PostNL	7
10	Mattia Bais (ITA)	Polti–Kometa	6

=== Young rider classification ===
Final young rider classification (1–10)
Rank	Rider	Team	Time
1	Tobias Lund Andresen (DEN)	Team dsm–firmenich PostNL	17h 24' 01"
2	Igor Arrieta (ESP)	UAE Team Emirates	+ 59"
3	Alexander Hajek (AUT)	Red Bull–Bora–Hansgrohe	+ 1' 32"
4	Fran Miholjević (CRO)	Team Bahrain Victorious	+ 1' 47"
5	Joris Reinderink (NED)	Metec–Solarwatt p/b Mantel	+ 11' 51"
6	Oscar Onley (GBR)	Team dsm–firmenich PostNL	+ 11' 57"
7	Aivaras Mikutis (LTU)	Tudor Pro Cycling Team	+ 13' 24"
8	Michael Leonard (CAN)	Ineos Grenadiers	+ 13' 24"
9	Pavel Bittner (CZE)	Team dsm–firmenich PostNL	+ 16' 16"
10	Hugo Aznar (ESP)	Equipo Kern Pharma	+ 17' 24"

=== Team classification ===
Final team classification (1–10)
Rank	Team	Time
1	(Netherlands) Team dsm–firmenich PostNL	52h 13' 34"
2	Team Bahrain Victorious	+ 1' 11"
3	(United Kingdom) Ineos Grenadiers	+ 2' 28"
4	(Norway) Uno-X Mobility	+ 5' 32"
5	(Germany) Red Bull–Bora–Hansgrohe	+ 12' 00"
6	(Switzerland) Tudor Pro Cycling Team	+ 16' 01"
7	(Italy) Polti–Kometa	+ 16' 12"
8	(Spain) Equipo Kern Pharma	+ 17' 07"
9	(Spain) Caja Rural–Seguros RGA	+ 23' 05"
10	(United Arab Emirates) UAE Team Emirates	+ 26' 34"
