= 2024 Super 8 Classic =

2024 UCI ProSeries
- Event poster with previous winner Mathieu van der Poel

Race details
- Dates: 21 September 2024
- Stages: 1
- Distance: 197.6 km (122.8 mi)
- Winning time: 4h 27' 09"

Results
| | Winner | Filippo Baroncini (ITA) | (UAE Team Emirates) |
| | Second | Rick Pluimers (NED) | (Tudor Pro Cycling Team) |
| | Third | Rui Oliveira (POR) | (UAE Team Emirates) |

The 2024 Super 8 Classic (also known as the Grand Prix Impanis-Van Petegem) was the 26th edition of the Super 8 Classic road cycling one day race, which was held on 21 September 2024 as part of the 2024 UCI ProSeries calendar.

== Teams ==
Twelve UCI WorldTeams, nine UCI ProTeams and one UCI Continental team made up the twenty-two teams that participated in the race.

UCI WorldTeams

- Alpecin–Deceuninck
- Arkéa–B&B Hotels
- Astana Qazaqstan Team
- Cofidis
- Intermarché–Wanty
- Lidl–Trek
- Movistar Team
- Red Bull–Bora–Hansgrohe
- Soudal–Quick-Step
- Team dsm–firmenich PostNL
- Team Jayco–AlUla
- UAE Team Emirates

UCI ProTeams

- Bingoal WB
- Caja Rural–Seguros RGA
- Euskaltel–Euskadi
- Israel–Premier Tech
- Lotto–Dstny
- Team Flanders–Baloise
- Team TotalEnergies
- Tudor Pro Cycling Team
- Uno-X Mobility

UCI Continental Teams

- Pauwels Sauzen–Bingoal

== Results ==
Result
| Rank | Rider | Team | Time |
|---|---|---|---|
| 1 | Filippo Baroncini (ITA) | UAE Team Emirates | 4h 27' 09" |
| 2 | Rick Pluimers (NED) | Tudor Pro Cycling Team | + 21" |
| 3 | Rui Oliveira (POR) | UAE Team Emirates | + 28" |
| 4 | Emilien Jeannière (FRA) | Team TotalEnergies | + 28" |
| 5 | Roger Adrià (ESP) | Red Bull–Bora–Hansgrohe | + 28" |
| 6 | Matteo Trentin (ITA) | Tudor Pro Cycling Team | + 28" |
| 7 | Laurenz Rex (BEL) | Intermarché–Wanty | + 28" |
| 8 | Jake Stewart (GBR) | Israel–Premier Tech | + 28" |
| 9 | Mike Teunissen (NED) | Intermarché–Wanty | + 28" |
| 10 | Dylan Vandenstorme (BEL) | Team Flanders–Baloise | + 28" |
