= Filippo Baroncini =

Italian cyclist (born 2000)

- Baroncini at Renewi Tour 2026

Personal information
- Born: 26 August 2000 (age 26) Massa Lombarda, Italy
- Height: 1.88 m (6 ft 2 in)

Cycling career
- Sport: Cycling
- Current team: UAE Team Emirates XRG
- Discipline: Road
- Role: Rider
- Rider type: Allrounder

Amateur teams
- 2010–2017: SC Massese
- 2018: Italia Nuova Borgo Panigale

Professional teams
- 2019–2020: Beltrami TSA
- 2021: Team Colpack–Ballan
- 2021: Trek–Segafredo (stagiaire)
- 2022–2023: Trek–Segafredo
- 2024–: UAE Team Emirates

Major wins
- Stage races Tour of Belgium (2025) One-day races and Classics Super 8 Classic (2024)
Medal record
Representing Italy
Men's road bicycle racing
World Championships
| Gold medal – first place | 2021 Flanders | Under-23 road race |
European Championships
| Silver medal – second place | 2021 Trentino | Under-23 road race |

Filippo Baroncini (born 26 August 2000) is an Italian professional cyclist who rides for UCI WorldTeam UAE Team Emirates. A versatile all-rounder, he won the under-23 road race at the 2021 UCI Road World Championships, took his first professional victory at the 2024 Super 8 Classic, and claimed his first WorldTour-level stage race overall at the 2025 Tour of Belgium.

Baroncini developed through the Italian UCI Continental teams Beltrami TSA and Team Colpack Ballan, before joining Trek–Segafredo as a stagiaire in 2021. The following year he joined on a full-time contract, and remained with the team through its rebranding to Lidl–Trek, competing there for two seasons before signing with UAE Team Emirates in 2024. He made his Grand Tour debut at the 2024 Vuelta a España, finishing 66th overall, and started the 2025 Giro d'Italia, placing 78th. In August 2025 he suffered a serious crash at the Tour de Pologne, was placed in an induced coma, and was later reported to be in recovery.

== Career ==
With his move to the under-23 ranks in 2019, Baroncini joined the Italian UCI Continental team Beltrami TSA; for the 2021 season he moved to Team Colpack Ballan. With Colpack he won the individual time trial at the Giro Ciclistico d'Italia and a stage of the UCI Nations' Cup U23 race Étoile d'Or. He also became Italian under-23 time trial champion and was runner-up in the under-23 road race at the national championships. At the 2021 European Road Championships he took silver in the under-23 road race.

Two weeks later he won the under-23 world title in Leuven, attacking solo in the final kilometres. Owing to those performances he rode as a stagiaire with Trek–Segafredo from 1 August 2021 and joined the WorldTeam full-time from 2022 (renamed Lidl–Trek in 2023). His best result during two seasons with Lidl–Trek was ninth overall at the 2023 Tour de Wallonie.

Baroncini moved to UAE Team Emirates for 2024, winning his first professional race at the Super 8 Classic in September. He made his Grand Tour debut at the 2024 Vuelta a España, finishing 66th overall. In June 2025, he won the overall classification at the Tour of Belgium.

On 6 August 2025, during stage 3 of the Tour de Pologne, Baroncini crashed into a wall and sustained multiple injuries. He was placed in an induced coma but remained in a stable, non–life-threatening condition and was flown to Milan for surgery. On 23 August, he was brought out of the induced coma following multiple operations, including an 11-hour maxillofacial surgery, and Italian outlets reported he was alert and set to leave intensive care as his recovery progressed.

== Major results ==
2018
3rd Road race, National Junior Road Championships
2019
4th Trofeo Città di Brescia
2020
1st Vicenza–Bionde
5th Trofeo Città di San Vendemiano
2021
UCI Road World Under-23 Championships

1st Road race
9th Time trial

National Under-23 Road Championships

1st Time trial
2nd Road race

1st Stage 4 (ITT) Giro Ciclistico d'Italia
UEC European Under-23 Road Championships

2nd Road race
7th Time trial

3rd Overall L'Étoile d'or

1st Stage 2

3rd Gran Premio Sportivi di Poggiana
4th Coppa Sabatini
6th Overall Giro della Regione Friuli Venezia Giulia
9th Ruota d'Oro
10th Piccolo Giro di Lombardia
2022
National Road Championships

5th Road race
5th Time trial

7th Overall Tour Poitou-Charentes en Nouvelle-Aquitaine
2023
9th Overall Tour de Wallonie
2024 (1 pro win)
1st Super 8 Classic
3rd Time trial, National Road Championships
4th Giro dell'Appennino
7th Veneto Classic
2025 (1)
1st Overall Tour of Belgium
2nd Time trial, National Road Championships
2026
9th Coppa Bernocchi
