= Axel van der Tuuk =

Dutch cyclist

Personal information
- Full name: Axel van der Tuuk
- Born: 25 May 2001 (age 25) Assen, Netherlands
- Height: 183 cm (6 ft 0 in)
- Weight: 71 kg (157 lb)

Cycling career
- Sport: Cycling
- Current team: Euskaltel–Euskadi
- Discipline: Road
- Role: Rider

Professional teams
- 2020–2021: Jumbo–Visma Development Team
- 2021–2025: Metec–Solarwatt p/b Mantel
- 2025–: Euskaltel–Euskadi

Axel van der Tuuk (born 25 May 2001) is a Dutch professional racing cyclist, who currently rides for UCI Continental team Euskaltel–Euskadi.

He is the younger brother of fellow racing cyclist Danny van der Tuuk, who also competes for UCI ProTeam Euskaltel–Euskadi. His mother Kaśka Rogulska is a former speed skater, who competed for both Poland and the Netherlands.

In August 2021, van der Tuuk made a mid-season transfer to Metec–Solarwatt p/b Mantel.

== Major results ==
2018
1st Time trial, National Junior Road Championships
1st E3 BinckBank Classic Junioren
1st Stage 1 (TTT) Tour du Pays de Vaud
2nd Guido Reybrouck Classic
4th Overall Ronde des Vallées

1st Stage 1

5th Overall La Coupe du Président de la Ville de Grudziądz

1st Stage 3

2019
1st Road race, National Junior Road Championships
1st Stage 2a (ITT) Ronde des Vallées
3rd E3 BinckBank Classic Junioren
5th Johan Museeuw Classic
10th La Route des Géants Saint-Omer–Ypres
2022
1st Time trial, National Under-23 Road Championships
1st Prologue (TTT) Tour de l'Avenir
2023
3rd Overall Flanders Tomorrow Tour

1st Stage 3a (ITT)

3rd Time trial, National Under-23 Road Championships
8th Time trial, UEC European Under-23 Road Championships
8th Paris–Tours Espoirs
2024
1st Ronde van Usquert
1st Ronde van Noordeloos
1st Mountains classification, CRO Race
3rd Overall Tour du Loir-et-Cher
4th Omloop der Kempen
5th Time trial, National Road Championships
2025
3rd Time trial, National Road Championships
7th Overall Danmark Rundt
10th Overall Tour of Belgium
2026
1st Gran Premio Primavera Ontur
3rd Overall ZLM Tour
4th Time trial, National Road Championships
4th Overall Tour Poitou-Charentes en Nouvelle-Aquitaine
