= Horné Naštice =

- Municipality
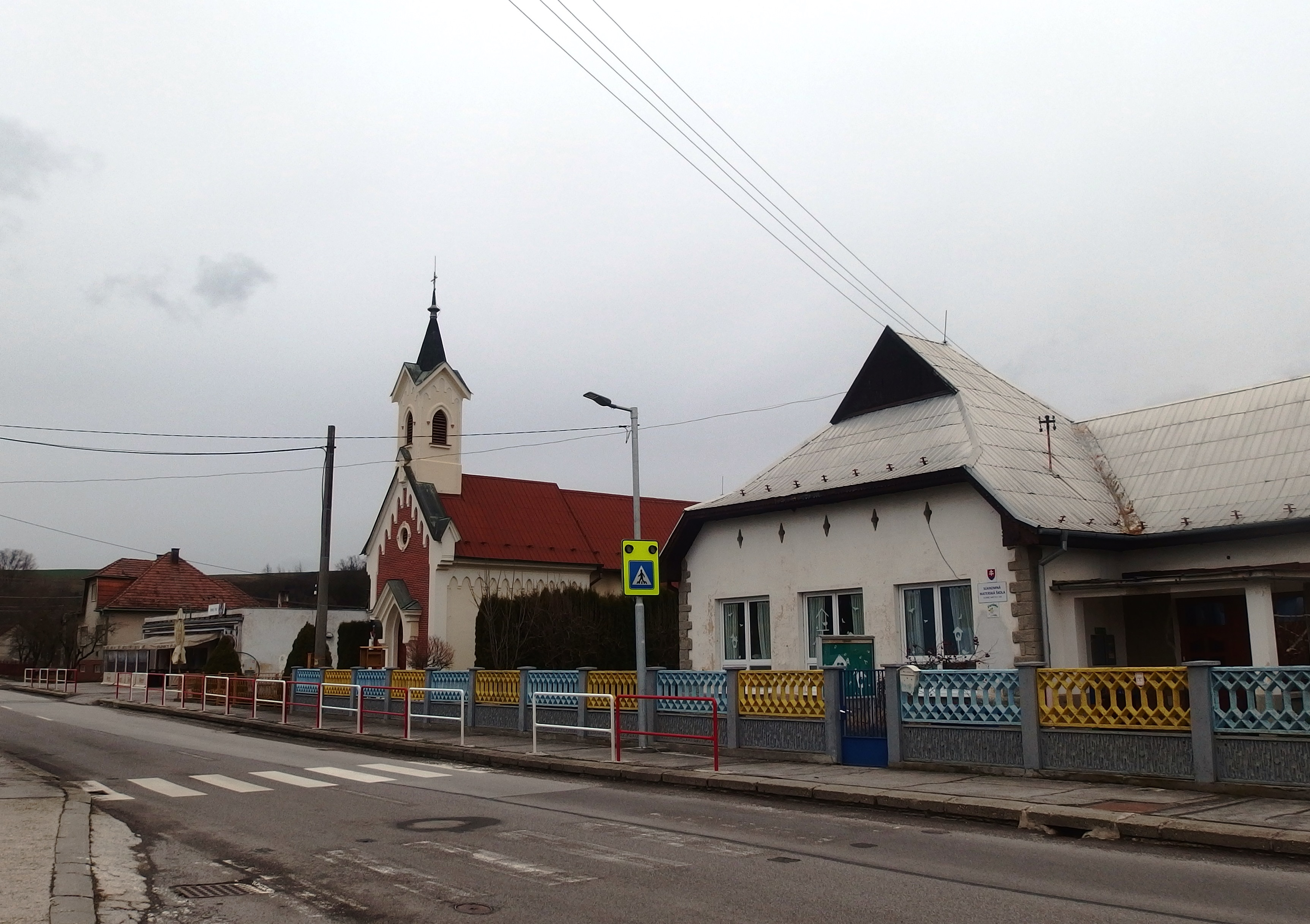

- Flag

- Location of Horné Naštice in the Trenčín Region Location of Horné Naštice in Slovakia
- Coordinates: 48.73°N 18.30°E
- Country: Slovakia
- Region: Trenčín Region
- District: Bánovce nad Bebravou District
- First mentioned: 1295

Area
  - Total: 8.56 km^{2} (3.31 sq mi)
- Elevation: 220 m (720 ft)

Population (2025)
  - Total: 530
- Time zone: UTC+1 (CET)
  - Summer (DST): UTC+2 (CEST)
- Postal code: 956 41
- Area code: +421 38
- Vehicle registration plate (until 2022): BN
- Website: www.obechornenastice.sk

Horné Naštice (Hungarian: Felsőneszte) is a village and municipality in Bánovce nad Bebravou District in the Trenčín Region of north-western Slovakia.

== History ==
In historical records the village was first mentioned in 1295.

== Geography ==
The municipality lies at an altitude of 220 metres (720 ft) and covers an area of 8.56 km^{2} (3.31 sq mi) (2025).

== Population ==
Population statistic (10 years)
Year	1995	2005	2015	2025
Count	446	415	434	530
Difference		−6.95%	+4.57%	+22.11%

Population statistic
Year	2024	2025
Count	529	530
Difference		+0.18%

It has a population of 530 people (31 December 2025).

=== Ethnicity ===
Census 2021 (1+ %)
Ethnicity	Number	Fraction
Slovak	499	98.61%
Not found out	9	1.77%
Total	506	

In year 2021 was 506 people by ethnicity 499 as Slovak, 9 as Not found out, 2 as Czech, 2 as Romanian, 1 as Ukrainian and 1 as Serbian.

Note on population: The difference values of population numbers in the table "Population statistic" and in the sections "Ethnicity" & "Religion" is caused by the use of various statistical methods.

=== Religion ===
Census 2021 (1+ %)
Religion	Number	Fraction
Roman Catholic Church	294	58.1%
Evangelical Church	112	22.13%
None	86	17%
Total	506	

In year 2021 was 506 people by religion 294 from Roman Catholic Church, 112 from Evangelical Church, 86 from None, 5 from Not found out, 2 from Eastern Orthodox Church, 2 from Jehovah's Witnesses, 2 from Ad hoc movements, 1 from Other and not ascertained christian church, 1 from Other and 1 from Greek Catholic Church.

== See also ==
- List of municipalities and towns in Slovakia

== Genealogical resources ==
The records for genealogical research are available at the state archive "Statny Archiv in Nitra,, Slovakia"

- Roman Catholic church records (births/marriages/deaths): 1700-1895 (parish B)
- Lutheran church records (births/marriages/deaths): 1732-1919 (parish B)
