= Dylan Vandenstorme =

Belgian cyclist (born 2002)

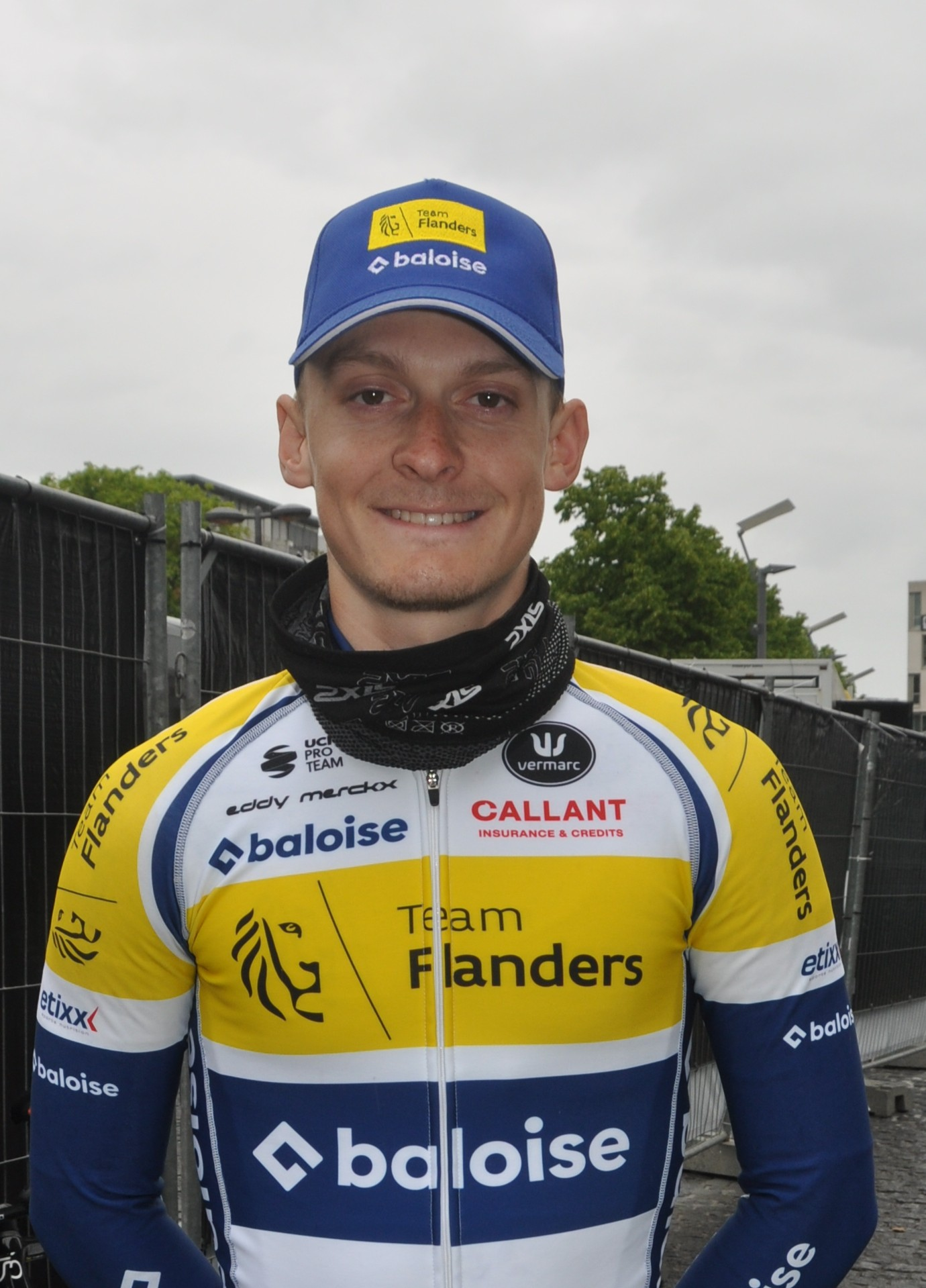
- Vandenstorme at the 2026 Rund um Köln

Personal information
- Born: 19 April 2002 (age 24) Aalst, Belgium
- Height: 1.72 m (5 ft 8 in)
- Weight: 62 kg (137 lb)

Cycling career
- Sport: Cycling
- Current team: Team Flanders–Baloise
- Discipline: Road
- Role: Rider
- Rider type: Classics specialist

Amateur teams
- 2019: Zannata Galloo Cycling Team
- 2020: Canguru–QTS–Air College Cycling Team
- 2021: Home Solution–Soenens
- 2022: EFC–L&R–AGS

Professional teams
- 2023: Circus–ReUz–Technord
- 2024–: Team Flanders–Baloise

Dylan Vandenstorme (born 19 April 2002) is a Belgian cyclist, who currently rides for UCI ProTeam Team Flanders–Baloise.

== Major results ==
2022
2nd Grand Prix Color Code
4th Omloop Het Nieuwsblad U23
2023
1st Stage 1 Giro della Valle d'Aosta
2nd Omloop Het Nieuwsblad U23
2nd Grote Prijs Jules Van Hevel
2nd Hel van Voerendaal
2nd Romsée-Stavelot-Romsée
3rd Grand Prix de la ville de Pérenchies
7th Memorial Philippe Van Coningsloo
2024
10th Super 8 Classic
