= Mads Landbo =

Danish cyclist

- Landbo in 2026

Personal information
- Born: 30 September 2004 (age 22) Hørsholm, Denmark

Cycling career
- Sport: Cycling
- Current team: Team ColoQuick
- Discipline: Road
- Role: Rider

Amateur team
- 2022: Tscherning Cycling Academy

Professional teams
- 2023–2024: Uno-X Dare Development Team
- 2025: Team Give Steel–2M Cycling Elite
- 2026–: Team ColoQuick

Mads Landbo (born 30 September 2004) is a Danish cyclist, who currently rides for UCI Continental team Team ColoQuick.

== Major results ==
2022
3rd Road race, National Junior Road Championships
2023
1st Stage 3 Baltic Chain Tour
2nd Road race, National Under-23 Road Championships
2024
1st Stage 3 Randers Bike Week
8th Paris–Tours Espoirs
2025
1st Time trial, National Under-23 Road Championships
2nd Eschborn–Frankfurt Under-23
5th Time trial, UEC European Under-23 Road Championships
2026
1st Time trial, National Under-23 Road Championships
1st Overall Flanders Tomorrow Tour

1st Stage 1a (ITT)

1st Grand Prix Herning
Course de la Paix U23

1st Points classification
1st Stages 1 & 2

1st Stage 3 Circuit des Ardennes
5th Time trial, UCI Road World Under-23 Championships
5th Time trial, National Road Championships
