= William Blume Levy =

Danish cyclist (born 2001)

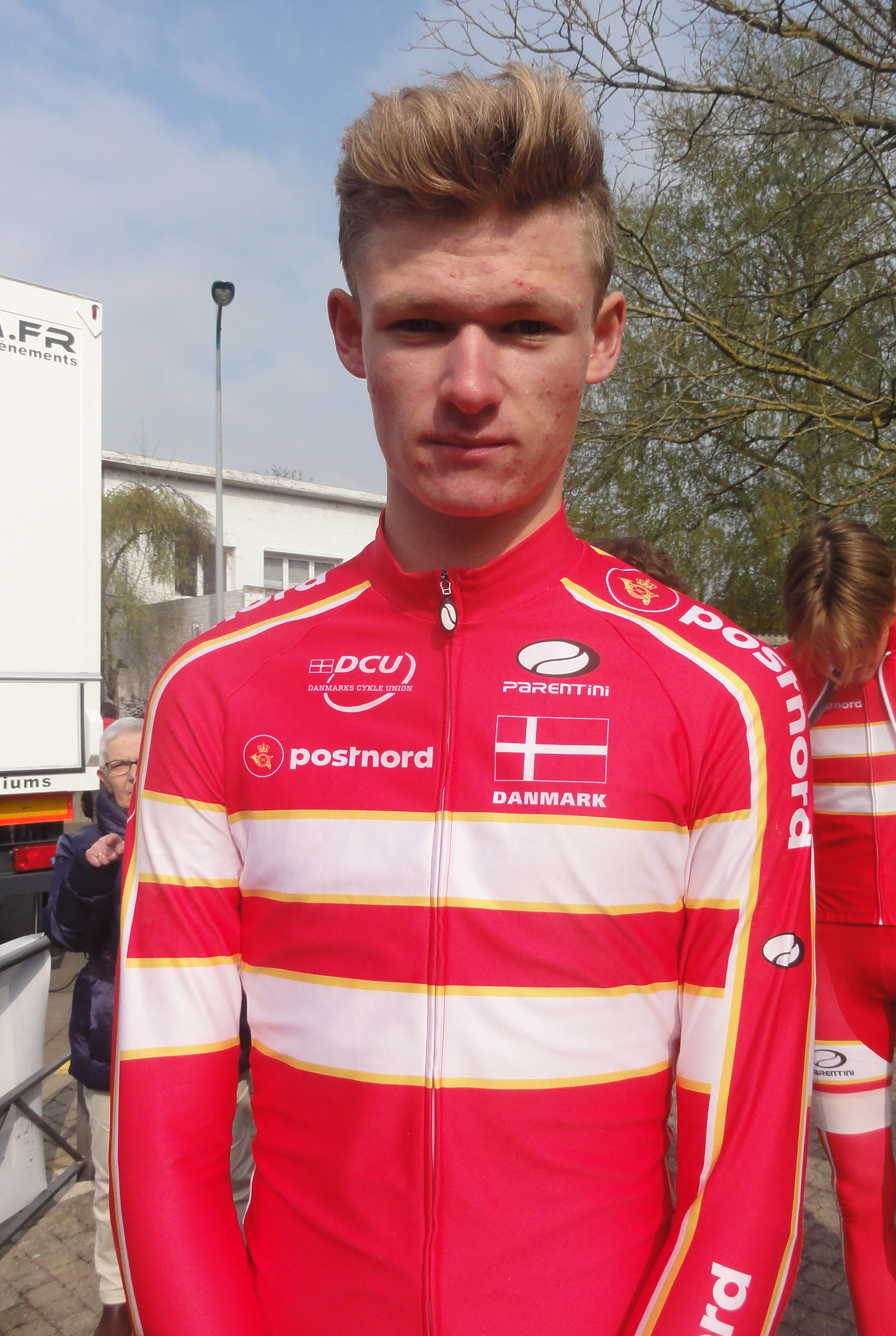
- Levy in 2019

Personal information
- Full name: William Blume Levy
- Born: 14 January 2001 (age 25) Horsens, Denmark

Cycling career
- Sport: Cycling
- Current team: Uno-X Mobility
- Discipline: Road
- Role: Rider

Amateur teams
- 2018: Børkop Cykler–Carl Ras Roskilde Junior
- 2019: NPV Carl Ras–Roskilde Junior

Professional teams
- 2020–2021: Team ColoQuick
- 2022–: Uno-X Pro Cycling Team

William Blume Levy (born 14 January 2001) is a Danish professional road cyclist, who currently rides for UCI ProTeam Uno-X Mobility.

== Major results ==
2018
2nd Overall Tour du Pays de Vaud

1st Young rider classification
1st Stage 2

3rd La Route des Géants
3rd Johan Museeuw Classic
4th Overall Sint-Martinusprijs Kontich

1st Stage 3a (ITT)

5th Junior Tour of Flanders
2019
1st Junior Tour of Flanders
National Junior Road Championships

3rd Road race
3rd Time trial

3rd Overall Tour du Pays de Vaud
2021
1st Gylne Gutuer
10th Overall Flanders Tomorrow Tour
2022
8th Grand Prix Alanya
2024
7th Muscat Classic
