= Jarosław Rębiewski =

Polish cyclist (born 1974)

Personal information
- Born: 27 February 1974 (age 52) Łódź, Poland

Cycling career
- Sport: Cycling
- Current team: Retired
- Discipline: Road
- Role: Rider

Amateur team
- 2018: Domin Sport

Professional teams
- 2000: Legia–Bazyliszek
- 2001–2002: Ceresit–CCC–Mat
- 2003: Mikomax–Browar Staropolski
- 2004–2006: Knauf Team
- 2007–2010: CCC–Polsat–Polkowice
- 2011: Bank BGŻ
- 2013–2017: Las Vegas Power Energy Drink

Jarosław Rębiewski (born 27 February 1974 in Łódź) is a Polish former professional road cyclist.

== Major results ==
1999
7th Overall Tour de Serbie
9th Overall Szlakiem Grodów Piastowskich
2000
10th Overall Bałtyk–Karkonosze Tour
10th GP Ostrowca Swietokrzyskiego
2001
7th Overall Tour of Slovenia
7th Overall Bałtyk–Karkonosze Tour
2002
4th Wyścig Kolarski o Puchar Trzech Miast
2003
1st GP Weltour
1st Stage 2a (ITT) 4 Asy Fiata Autopoland
3rd Pasmem Gór Świętokrzyskich
4th Wyścig Kolarski o Puchar Trzech Miast
2004
1st Stage 6 Bałtyk–Karkonosze Tour
7th Memoriał Henryka Łasaka
2005
Tour of Bulgaria

1st Stages 2a (TTT) & 4a

3rd National Time Trial Championships
9th Overall Dookoła Mazowsza
2006
1st Prologue (ITT) Bałtyk–Karkonosze Tour
3rd National Time Trial Championships
5th Pomorski Klasyk
8th Overall Dookoła Mazowsza
9th EOS Tallinn GP
9th Szlakiem Walk Majora Hubala
2007
2nd National Time Trial Championships
5th Overall Course de la Solidarité Olympique
5th Overall Dookoła Mazowsza
10th Overall Szlakiem Walk Majora Hubala
2008
1st Stage 7 Bałtyk–Karkonosze Tour
1st Stage 4 (ITT) Tour of Małopolska
6th Overall Circuit des Ardennes
8th Overall Szlakiem Grodów Piastowskich
8th Puchar Ministra Obrony Narodowej
10th Overall Course de la Solidarité Olympique
2009
8th Overall Dookoła Mazowsza
2012
7th Overall Dookoła Mazowsza
2013
9th Memoriał Henryka Łasaka
2014
5th Overall Memorial Grundmanna I Wizowskiego
