= Wojciech Pawłak =

Polish cyclist

Personal information
- Born: 31 October 1969 (age 56) Ostrów Wielkopolski, Poland
- Height: 1.76 m (5 ft 9 in)
- Weight: 73 kg (161 lb)

Cycling career
- Sport: Cycling
- Current team: Retired
- Discipline: Road
- Role: Rider

Professional teams
- 2000–2001: Atlas–Lukullus
- 2002–2007: Mikomax–Browar Staropolski
- 2008: Mróz–Action–UNIQA

Wojciech Pawłak (born 31 October 1969) is a Polish former professional road cyclist. He competed at the 1988 Summer Olympics and the 1992 Summer Olympics.

== Major results ==
1998
8th Overall Course de Solidarność et des Champions Olympiques
2000
4th Road race, National Road Championships
5th Overall Course de Solidarność et des Champions Olympiques
2002
2nd Time trial, National Road Championships
2003
2nd Puchar Ministra Obrony Narodowej
3rd Overall Szlakiem Grodów Piastowskich
2004
3rd Overall Szlakiem Walk Majora Hubala
4th Klasyk im. Wincentego Witosa
8th Overall Szlakiem Grodów Piastowskich
9th Overall Bałtyk–Karkonosze Tour
9th Overall Tour du Maroc
2005
2nd Puchar Uzdrowisk Karpackich
2nd Majowy Wyścig Klasyczny-Lublin
10th Pomorski Klasyk
2006
1st Tartu GP
3rd Overall Szlakiem Grodów Piastowskich
6th Memoriał Henryka Łasaka
2007
2nd Pomorski Klasyk
4th Overall Szlakiem Walk Majora Hubala
5th Puchar Uzdrowisk Karpackich
7th Overall Tour of Małopolska
7th Overall Bałtyk–Karkonosze Tour
8th Overall Course de Solidarność et des Champions Olympiques
8th Overall Dookoła Mazowsza
10th Overall Szlakiem Grodów Piastowskich
2008
2nd Overall Szlakiem Walk Majora Hubala

1st Stage 1

5th Puchar Ministra Obrony Narodowej
