= Mateusz Komar =

Polish cyclist

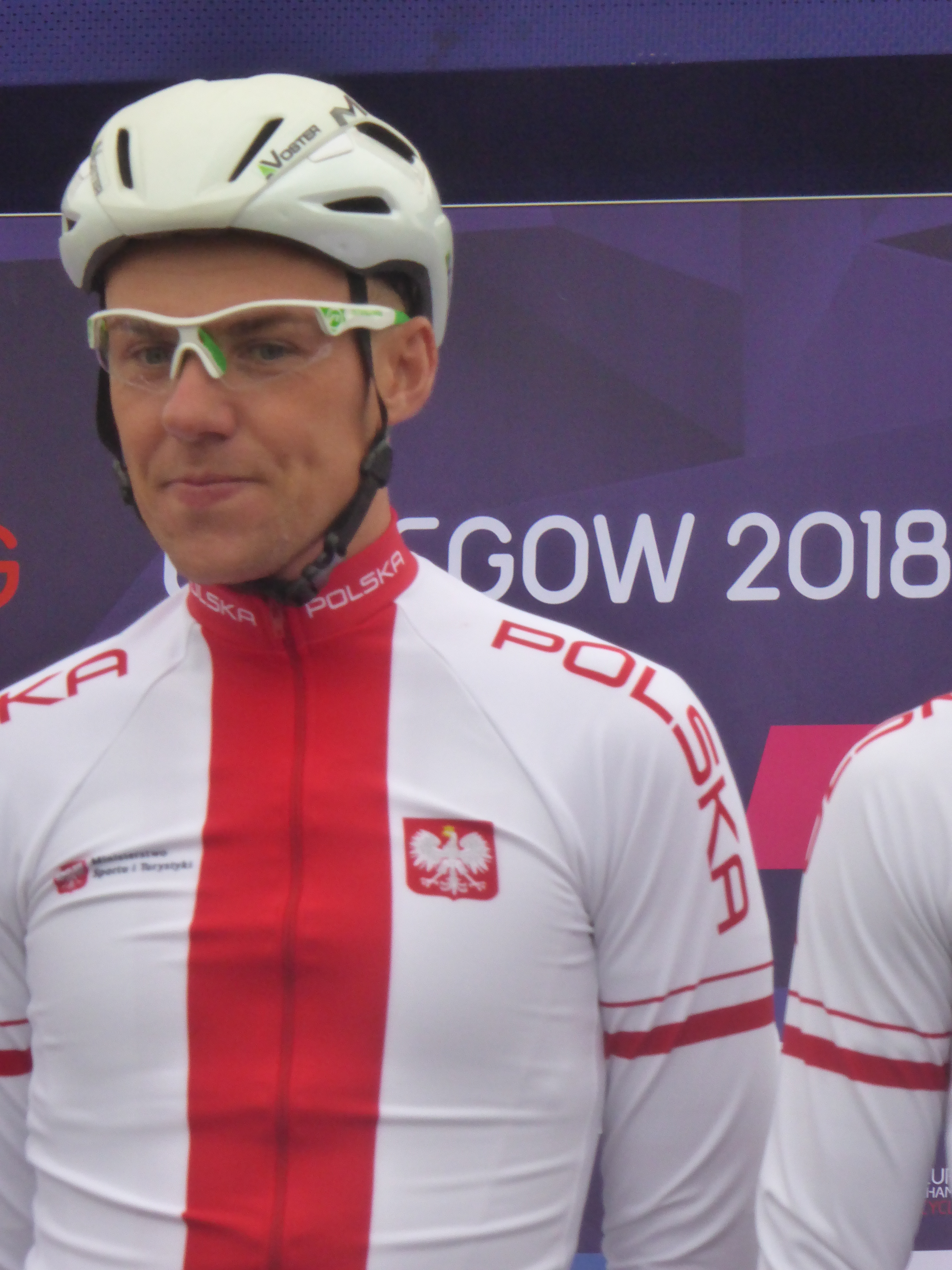
- Komar at the 2018 European Road Cycling Championships

Personal information
- Full name: Mateusz Komar
- Born: 18 July 1985 (age 41) Słubice, Poland

Cycling career
- Sport: Cycling
- Current team: Retired
- Discipline: Road
- Role: Rider

Amateur teams
- 2011: BDC Team
- 2015: Whistle Ziemia Brzeska

Professional teams
- 2007–2009: DHL–Author
- 2010: Mróz–Active Jet
- 2012–2014: BDC–Marcpol Team
- 2016: Domin Sport
- 2017–2019: Voster Uniwheels Team

Mateusz Komar (born 18 July 1985) is a Polish former racing cyclist, who competed between 2007 and 2019 for five professional teams. He rode at the 2013 UCI Road World Championships, competing with BDC–Marcpol Team in the team time trial.

== Major results ==
2007
1st Overall Tour of Małopolska

1st Stage 1

2nd Overall Szlakiem Walk Majora Hubala

1st Young rider classification
1st Stage 1

2nd Memoriał Henryka Łasaka
8th Grand Prix Bradlo
9th La Côte Picarde
2008
5th Pomorski Klasyk
9th Memoriał Henryka Łasaka
2009
1st Stage 4 Bałtyk–Karkonosze Tour
6th Memoriał Henryka Łasaka
2011
1st Stage 5 Dookoła Mazowsza
2013
1st Mountains classification, Tour of Estonia
1st Stage 7 Tour du Maroc
1st Stage 4 (TTT) Dookoła Mazowsza
2nd Puchar Ministra Obrony Narodowej
7th Overall Baltic Chain Tour
10th Jūrmala Grand Prix
2014
4th Overall Dookoła Mazowsza
4th Memoriał Andrzeja Trochanowskiego
6th Puchar Ministra Obrony Narodowej
8th Overall Memorial Grundmanna I Wizowskiego
2015
6th Memoriał Henryka Łasaka
10th Puchar Ministra Obrony Narodowej
2016
1st Korona Kocich Gór
Tour of Małopolska

1st Points classification
1st Stage 2

2017
1st Overall Course de Solidarność et des Champions Olympiques

1st Stage 4

2nd Korona Kocich Gór
4th Puchar Ministra Obrony Narodowej
7th Visegrad 4 Bicycle Race – GP Polski
9th Memoriał Andrzeja Trochanowskiego
2018
2nd Memorial Grundmanna I Wizowskiego
9th Memoriał Andrzeja Trochanowskiego
