= Artur Detko =

Polish cyclist

Personal information
- Full name: Artur Detko
- Born: 18 February 1983 (age 43) Radomsko, Poland

Cycling career
- Sport: Cycling
- Discipline: Road
- Role: Rider

Amateur team
- 2018: Domin Sport

Professional teams
- 2005–2006: Knauf Team
- 2007: Dynatek
- 2008–2009: DHL–Author
- 2010: Aktio Group Mostostal Puławy
- 2011: Bank BGŻ
- 2013–2017: Las Vegas Power Energy Drink
- 2019: Hurom BDC Development

Artur Detko (born 18 February 1983 in Radomsko) is a Polish cyclist, who last rode for UCI Continental team Hurom BDC Development.

== Major results ==
2007
5th Memoriał Henryka Łasaka
2008
2nd Memoriał Andrzeja Trochanowskiego
3rd Overall Dookoła Mazowsza

1st Stage 5 (TTT)

3rd Grand Prix Kooperativa
5th Majowy Wyścig Klasyczny-Lublin
5th Coupe des Carpathes
9th Overall Szlakiem Walk Majora Hubala
9th Pomorski Klasyk
2009
1st Overall Tour of Małopolska

1st Stage 1

1st Overall Pomerania Tour

1st Stages 1 & 2

2010
1st Stage 1 Bałtyk–Karkonosze Tour
5th Pomerania Tour
2011
1st Stage 6 Bałtyk–Karkonosze Tour
9th Overall Dookoła Mazowsza
2012
3rd Coupe des Carpathes
2013
9th Overall Course de Solidarność et des Champions Olympiques
2014
1st Stage 1 Bałtyk–Karkonosze Tour
3rd Visegrad 4 Bicycle Race – GP Polski Via Odra
7th Overall Memorial Grundmanna I Wizowskiego
9th Overall Tour of Małopolska
10th Overall Course de Solidarność et des Champions Olympiques
10th Overall Dookoła Mazowsza
2015
3rd Memorial Grundmanna I Wizowskiego
2016
3rd Memoriał Henryka Łasaka
4th Korona Kocich Gór
6th Visegrad 4 Bicycle Race – GP Czech Republic
6th Memorial Grundmanna I Wizowskiego
2017
3rd Memoriał Henryka Łasaka
9th Memorial Grundmanna I Wizowskiego
2019
2nd Memoriał Henryka Łasaka
7th Coupe des Carpathes
8th Visegrad 4 Bicycle Race – GP Polski
