= Mariusz Witecki =

Polish road racing cyclist

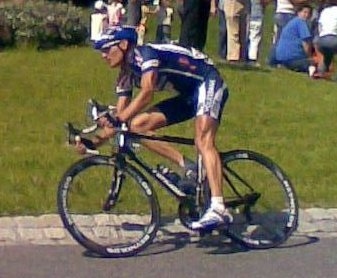
- Witecki at the 2007 Deutschland Tour

Personal information
- Full name: Mariusz Witecki
- Born: 10 May 1981 (age 45) Kielce, Poland

Cycling career
- Sport: Cycling
- Current team: Voster Team
- Discipline: Road
- Role: Rider (retired); Directeur sportif; Team manager

Amateur team
- 2008: Mróz–Action–UNIQA

Professional teams
- 2003–2005: Servisco–Koop
- 2006: Intel–Action
- 2007: Team Volksbank
- 2009–2010: Mróz Continental Team
- 2011: CCC–Polsat–Polkowice
- 2012–2013: Bank BGŻ
- 2014–2016: Mexller

Managerial team
- 2017–: Voster Uniwheels Team

Major wins
- National Road Race Championships (2006); Memoriał Andrzeja Trochanowskiego (2004); Coupe des Carpathes (2008); Szlakiem Grodów Piastowskich (2009); Memoriał Henryka Łasaka (2010)

Mariusz Witecki (born 10 May 1981) is a Polish former professional road bicycle racer, who rode professionally between 2003 and 2016 for the Team Volksbank, Mróz–Active Jet, CCC–Polsat–Polkowice, Bank BGŻ and Domin Sport teams. He now works as the team manager for UCI Continental team Voster Team.

Born in Kielce, Witecki won the five-day Course de la Solidarité Olympique stage race in Poland in July 2012, beating Team NetApp's Bartosz Huzarski by five seconds.

== Major results ==
2003
9th Paris–Roubaix Espoirs
10th Grand Prix de la ville de Pérenchies
2004
1st Memoriał Andrzeja Trochanowskiego
6th Szlakiem Walk Majora Hubala
8th Coupe des Carpathes
2005
4th Szlakiem Walk Majora Hubala
4th Pomorski Klasyk
5th Miedzynarodowy 3-Majow Wyscig
9th Memoriał Henryka Łasaka
2006
1st Road race, National Road Championships
3rd Coupe des Carpathes
9th Overall Bałtyk–Karkonosze Tour
2007
9th Giro di Festina
10th Overall Sachsen Tour
2008
1st Coupe des Carpathes
2nd Overall Tour of Małopolska
4th Overall Tour of Japan
7th Overall Bałtyk–Karkonosze Tour

1st Stage 6

2009
1st Overall Szlakiem Grodów Piastowskich
10th Memoriał Andrzeja Trochanowskiego
2010
1st Memoriał Henryka Łasaka
2nd Road race, National Road Championships
2012
1st Overall Course de la Solidarité Olympique
1st Overall Memorial Grundmanna I Wizowskiego
3rd Overall Tour of Małopolska
8th Overall Dookoła Mazowsza
2013
4th Coupe des Carpathes
7th Puchar Ministra Obrony Narodowej
2014
5th Coupe des Carpathes
2015
9th Coupe des Carpathes
10th Overall Course de Solidarność et des Champions Olympiques
