= Tomasz Lisowicz =

Polish cyclist (1977–2024)

Personal information
- Born: 23 February 1977 Kalisz, Poland
- Died: 8 August 2024 (aged 47) Kalisz County, Poland

Cycling career
- Sport: Cycling
- Discipline: Road
- Role: Rider

Professional teams
- 2000–2001: Atlas
- 2002–2003: Mikomax–Browar Staropolski
- 2004–2006: Knauf Team
- 2007–2010: CCC–Polsat–Polkowice
- 2011: Bank BGŻ
- 2013: Las Vegas Power Energy Drink

Major wins
- One-day races and Classics National Time Trial Championships (2003)

Tomasz Lisowicz (23 February 1977 – 8 August 2024) was a Polish racing cyclist.

Lisowicz was the 2003 national time trial champion.

On the 8 August 2024, Lisowicz died after collapsing suddenly during a cycling training session. He was 47.

== Major results ==
1999
7th Rund um die Hainleite
10th Warszawa - Lodz
2000
3rd Overall Dookoła Mazowsza

1st Stage 5 (TTT)

3rd Overall Szlakiem Grodów Piastowskich
2001
10th Overall Szlakiem Grodów Piastowskich
2002
1st Coupe des Carpathes
2003
1st Time trial, National Road Championships
8th Overall Szlakiem Grodów Piastowskich
2004
3rd Overall Malopolski Wyscig Gorski
3rd Memoriał Henryka Łasaka
2006
1st Szlakiem Walk Majora Hubala
3rd Neuseen Classics-Rund um die Braunkohle
2007
1st Memoriał Andrzeja Trochanowskiego
2009
3rd Puchar Ministra Obrony Narodowej
