= Błażej Janiaczyk =

Polish cyclist (born 1983)

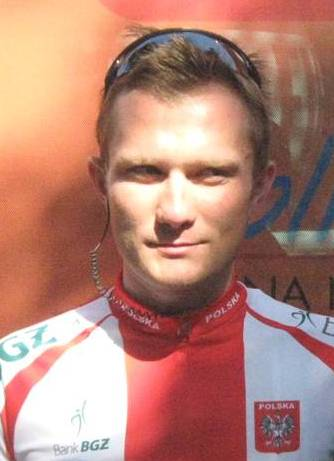
- Janiaczyk at the 2007 Bałtyk–Karkonosze Tour

Personal information
- Full name: Błażej Janiaczyk
- Born: 27 January 1983 (age 43) Toruń, Poland

Cycling career
- Sport: Cycling
- Current team: Retired
- Discipline: Road
- Role: Rider

Amateur teams
- 2004: Norda Volvo Dorini
- 2008: Mróz–Action–UNIQA

Professional teams
- 2005–2006: Androni Giocattoli–3C Casalinghi
- 2007: Intel–Action
- 2009–2010: Mróz Continental Team
- 2011: CCC–Polsat–Polkowice
- 2012–2013: Bank BGŻ
- 2014: BDC Marcpol
- 2015: Kolss BDC Team
- 2016: Wibatech–Fuji

Błażej Janiaczyk (born 27 January 1983) is a Polish former racing cyclist, who professionally between 2005 and 2016 for the Team 3C Casalinghi Jet Androni Giocattoli, Mróz–Active Jet, CCC–Polsat–Polkowice, Bank BGŻ, BDC Marcpol, Kolss BDC Team and Wibatech–Fuji teams. He rode at the 2014 UCI Road World Championships.

== Major results ==
2004
1st La Roue Tourangelle
1st Coppa della Pace
3rd Trofeo Banca Popolare di Vicenza
4th GP Kranj
7th Road race, UEC European Under-23 Road Championships
7th Giro del Belvedere
2005
3rd Time trial, National Under-23 Road Championships
2006
7th Giro del Piemonte
2007
2nd Overall Course de la Solidarité Olympique

1st Points classification

5th Overall Bałtyk–Karkonosze Tour
10th Neuseen Classics
2008
2nd Memoriał Henryka Łasaka
3rd Overall Course de la Solidarité Olympique
3rd Overall Tour of Hainan
6th Overall Szlakiem Walk Majora Hubala
2009
3rd Road race, National Road Championships
5th Memoriał Andrzeja Trochanowskiego
9th Overall Tour of Hainan
2010
4th Pomerania Tour
5th Overall Tour of Małopolska
10th Overall Szlakiem Grodów Piastowskich
2012
8th Puchar Ministra Obrony Narodowej
9th Overall Szlakiem Grodów Piastowskich
9th Overall Course de la Solidarité Olympique
9th Overall Okolo Jižních Čech
9th Poreč Trophy
9th Memoriał Andrzeja Trochanowskiego
2013
7th Overall Dookoła Mazowsza
2014
1st Overall Memorial Grundmanna I Wizowskiego
2nd Race Horizon Park 1
2nd Race Horizon Park 3
4th Memoriał Henryka Łasaka
6th Overall Tour of Małopolska
8th Croatia–Slovenia
2015
3rd Visegrad 4 Bicycle Race – GP Hungary
4th Overall Tour of Estonia
2016
3rd Visegrad 4 Bicycle Race – GP Slovakia
3rd Memoriał Andrzeja Trochanowskiego
6th Horizon Park Classic
