= Kazimierz Stafiej =

Personal information
- Born: 22 February 1968 (age 58) Nowa Sarzyna, Poland

Cycling career
- Sport: Cycling
- Current team: Retired
- Discipline: Road
- Role: Rider

Professional teams
- 1996: Pecaes–Bolato
- 2000–2005: Mróz–Supradyn Witaminy
- 2006–2007: DHL–Author

Kazimierz Stafiej (born 22 February 1968 in Nowa Sarzyna) is a Polish former road cyclist. He competed as a professional from 1996 to 2007.

== Major results ==
1994
7th Overall Regio-Tour
2000
5th Overall Tour of Japan

1st Mountains classification
1st Stage 5

5th Memoriał Andrzeja Trochanowskiego
2001
1st Stage 1 Tour of Małopolska
2nd Overall Ringerike GP
4th Overall Herald Sun Tour
5th Grand Prix Midtbank
5th GP Aarhus
10th Overall Tour of Japan

1st Stage 4

2002
3rd Memoriał Henryka Łasaka
7th GP Rudy Dhaenens
7th Ronde van Drenthe
8th Overall Tour of Japan
2003
1st Puchar Ministra Obrony Narodowej
1st Stage 1 Szlakiem Grodów Piastowskich
3rd Tartu Grand Prix
6th Tallinn–Tartu Grand Prix
6th Lubelski Wyscig 3-Majowy
2004
1st Szlakiem Walk Majora Hubala
2nd Klasyk im. Wincentego Witosa
6th Memoriał Henryka Łasaka
9th Overall Tour of Małopolska
2005
6th Szlakiem Walk Majora Hubala
2006
2nd Overall Bałtyk–Karkonosze Tour
3rd Road race, National Road Championships
4th GP Kooperativa
7th Overall Tour of Małopolska
7th Memoriał Andrzeja Trochanowskiego
9th Puchar Uzdrowisk Karpackich
2007
1st Stage 5 Okolo Slovenska
2nd Puchar Ministra Obrony Narodowej
2nd Puchar Uzdrowisk Karpackich
9th Overall Szlakiem Walk Majora Hubala
9th GP Hydraulika Mikolasek
10th Overall Tour of Croatia
10th Overall Course de Solidarność et des Champions Olympiques
