= Łukasz Podolski (cyclist) =

Polish road cyclist (born 1980)

Personal information
- Born: 21 May 1980 (age 46) Skierniewice, Poland

Cycling career
- Sport: Cycling
- Current team: Retired
- Discipline: Road
- Role: Rider

Professional teams
- 2002–2003: CCC–Polsat
- 2004–2005: Grupa PSB
- 2007: Weltour

Łukasz Podolski (born 21 May 1980) is a Polish former professional road cyclist. He most notably won the 2006 Tour du Sénégal.

== Major results ==
2002
1st Stage 7 Bałtyk–Karkonosze Tour
5th Paris–Mantes-en-Yvelines
2003
5th Memoriał Andrzeja Trochanowskiego
2004
1st Memoriał Romana Siemińskiego
3rd Miedzynarodowy 3-Majow Wyscig
5th Overall Course de Solidarność et des Champions Olympiques
2005
5th Szlakiem Walk Majora Hubala
2006
1st Overall Tour du Sénégal

1st Prologue & Stages 2, 3, 6 & 9

1st Stage 5 Dookoła Mazowsza
4th Puchar Ministra Obrony Narodowej
7th Szlakiem Walk Majora Hubala
7th GP Kooperativa
2007
1st Mountains classification, Course de Solidarność et des Champions Olympiques
3rd Memoriał Andrzeja Trochanowskiego
5th Tartu GP
