= Bogdan Bondariew =

Ukrainian cyclist

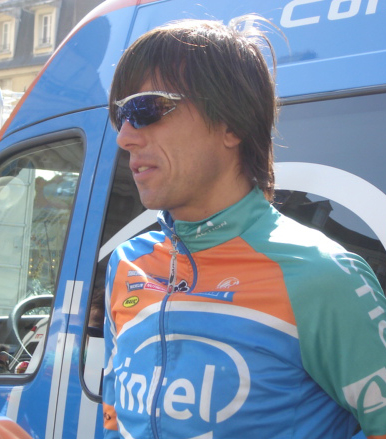

Personal information
- Born: 2 June 1974 (age 52) Donetsk, Ukrainian SSR, Soviet Union
- Height: 1.96 m (6 ft 5 in)

Cycling career
- Sport: Cycling
- Current team: Retired
- Disciplines: Road; Track
- Role: Rider

Professional teams
- 2001–2001: Mróz–Supradyn Witaminy
- 2003: CCC–Polsat
- 2004–2007: Action
Medal record
Representing Ukraine
Men's track cycling
World Championships
Silver medal – second place	1995 Bogotá	Team pursuit

Bogdan Bondariew (born 2 June 1974) is a Ukrainian former professional cyclist.

== Major results ==
1995
2nd Team pursuit, UCI Track World Championships
2000
1st Stage 3 Bałtyk–Karkonosze Tour
2001
1st Stage 3 Tour de Pologne
1st Stages 2 & 9 Peace Race
1st Prologue Malopolski Wyscig Gorski
1st Stage 5 Inter. Course 4 Asy Fiata Autopoland
2002
1st Memoriał Andrzeja Trochanowskiego
1st Stage 1 Bałtyk–Karkonosze Tour
1st Stage 2 Szlakiem Grodów Piastowskich
1st Prologue & Stage 2 Inter. Course 4 Asy Fiata Autopoland
2nd Time trial, National Road Championships
2003
1st Stage 2 Szlakiem Grodów Piastowskich
1st Stage 5 Dookoła Mazowsza
2004
1st Overall Course de la Solidarité Olympique

1st Stage 3

1st Overall Malopolski Wyscig Gorski
6th Overall Bałtyk–Karkonosze Tour
2005
1st Stage 3 Bałtyk–Karkonosze Tour
8th Puchar Ministra Obrony Narodowej
2006
1st Stages 6 & 9 Tour of Qinghai Lake
2007
5th Puchar Ministra Obrony Narodowej
