= Adam Stachowiak (cyclist) =

Polish cyclist

Personal information
- Full name: Adam Stachowiak
- Born: 10 July 1989 (age 37) Żyrardów, Poland
- Height: 176 cm (5 ft 9 in)
- Weight: 64 kg (141 lb)

Cycling career
- Sport: Cycling
- Current team: Mazowsze Serce Polski
- Discipline: Road
- Role: Rider (retired); Directeur sportif

Amateur teams
- 2008–2010: PTC Pruszkàw
- 2011: KLTC Konin

Professional teams
- 2012–2013: Bank BGŻ
- 2014: BDC Marcpol
- 2015: Kolss BDC Team
- 2016: Verva ActiveJet
- 2017–2020: Voster Uniwheels Team
- 2021–2023: Mazowsze Serce Polski

Managerial team
- 2024–: Mazowsze Serce Polski

Adam Stachowiak (born 10 July 1989) is a Polish former racing cyclist, who competed as a professional from 2012 to 2023. He now works as a directeur sportif for UCI Continental team Mazowsze Serce Polski. He rode at the 2014 UCI Road World Championships.

== Major results ==
2013
8th Overall Czech Cycling Tour
9th Overall Szlakiem Grodów Piastowskich
2014
1st Mountains classification, Tour of Małopolska
2nd Coupe des Carpathes
6th Overall Course de la Solidarité Olympique
6th Race Horizon Park 2
10th Overall Memorial Grundmanna I Wizowskiego
2015
1st Memorial Grundmanna I Wizowskiego
4th Visegrad 4 Bicycle Race – GP Polski
5th Overall Szlakiem Grodów Piastowskich
6th Sochi Cup
7th Grand Prix of Sochi Mayor
10th Overall Grand Prix of Sochi
2016
4th Overall Bałtyk–Karkonosze Tour
8th Overall Szlakiem Grodów Piastowskich
2017
3rd Overall Bałtyk–Karkonosze Tour
3rd Overall Course de la Solidarité Olympique
3rd Visegrad 4 Bicycle Race – Kerékpárverseny
4th Overall Szlakiem Walk Majora Hubala
5th Coupe des Carpathes
6th Overall Tour of Małopolska

1st Mountains classification

2018
4th Overall Bałtyk–Karkonosze Tour
5th Overall Course de la Solidarité Olympique
10th Overall Szlakiem Walk Majora Hubala
2019
1st Overall Tour of Małopolska

1st Stage 3

3rd Overall Bałtyk–Karkonosze Tour
8th Memoriał Andrzeja Trochanowskiego
2020
3rd Overall Bałtyk–Karkonosze Tour
5th Overall Tour of Małopolska
8th Overall Tour of Bulgaria
2021
5th Overall Tour of Małopolska
5th Overall Tour de Serbie
9th Overall Szlakiem Grodów Piastowskich
