= Tobiasz Pawlak =

Polish cyclist (born 1995)

Personal information
- Born: 24 November 1995 (age 30) Ostrów Wielkopolski, Poland
- Height: 1.89 m (6 ft 2 in)
- Weight: 79 kg (174 lb)

Cycling career
- Sport: Cycling
- Current team: Mazowsze Serce Polski
- Discipline: Road
- Role: Rider

Amateur teams
- 2013: Kaliskie Towarzystwo Kolarskie
- 2016–2017: Klub Kolarski Tarnovia
- 2018: Domin Sport

Professional teams
- 2014–2015: Mexller
- 2019: Hurom BDC Development
- 2020–: Mazowsze Serce Polski

Tobiasz Pawlak (born 24 November 1995) is a Polish professional racing cyclist, who rides for UCI Continental team Mazowsze Serce Polski.

== Major results ==
2013
2nd Time trial, National Junior Road Championships
8th Overall Coupe du Président de la Ville de Grudziądz

1st Stage 2

2017
3rd Road race, National Under-23 Road Championships
10th Overall Dookoła Mazowsza
10th Puchar Ministra Obrony Narodowej
2018
4th Grand Prix Poland, Visegrad 4 Bicycle Race
5th Memoriał Andrzeja Trochanowskiego
10th Memoriał Henryka Łasaka
2019
3rd Memorial Grundmanna I Wizowskiego
5th Puchar Ministra Obrony Narodowej
10th Memoriał Romana Siemińskiego
2021
6th Overall Tour of Szeklerland
2022
1st Stage 1 (TTT) Belgrade Banjaluka
4th Road race, National Road Championships
5th Overall In the Steps of Romans
2024
1st Overall Course de Solidarność et des Champions Olympiques

1st Points classification

1st Overall Tour de Kurpie

1st Points classification
1st Stages 1, 2 & 3 (TTT)

7th Memoriał Andrzeja Trochanowskiego
