= Piotr Chmielewski =

Polish cyclist

Personal information
- Full name: Piotr Chmielewski
- Born: 18 September 1970 (age 56) Lublin, Poland
- Height: 1.87 m (6 ft 2 in)
- Weight: 72 kg (159 lb)

Cycling career
- Sport: Cycling
- Current team: Retired
- Discipline: Road
- Role: Rider

Professional teams
- 1996: Pecaes-Bolato-Langrover
- 2000–2002: Mróz–Supradyn Witaminy
- 2003: CCC–Polsat
- 2004–2005: Action
- 2006: CCC–Polsat
- 2008: Mróz–Action–UNIQA

Piotr Chmielewski (born 18 September 1970) is a Polish former racing cyclist.

== Palmarès ==
Date	Placing	Event	Location	Country
16 May 1992	1	Stage 8, Peace Race	Trutnov	Czechoslovakia
1993	1	General Classification, Polska-Ukraina		Poland
1996	1	Polish National Time Trial Championships		Poland
1997	3	Polish National Time Trial Championships		Poland
1998	1	General Classification, Bałtyk–Karkonosze Tour		Poland
2000	1	Memoriał Andrzeja Trochanowskiego		Poland
2000	1	Stage 3, Course de la Solidarité Olympique		Poland
7 March 2001	1	Stage 2, Giro del Capo	Stellenbosch	South Africa
10 March 2001	1	General Classification, Giro del Capo		South Africa
27 July 2001	1	Stage 3, Dookoła Mazowsza	Nowy Dwór Mazowiecki	Poland
23 August 2001	1	Memoriał Henryka Łasaka		Poland
7 September 2001	1	Stage 5, Tour de Pologne	Szklarska Poręba	Poland
26 October 2001	1	Stage 12 (team time trial), Herald Sun Tour (Note: The other riders on the team were Eugen Wacker, Remigius Lupeikis, Zbigniew Piątek and Kazimierz Stafiej.)	Hamilton	Australia
27 October 2001	1	Stage 14 Herald Sun Tour	Colac	Australia
26 July 2003	1	Stage 4, Dookoła Mazowsza	Płońsk	Poland
8 August 2003	1	Stage 3, Tour of Małopolska	Gorlice	Poland
18 July 2004	1	Slupska do Ustiki Pomorskim Klasyku		Poland
29 August 2004	1	General Classification, Tour de Slovaquie		Slovakia
1 May 2006	1	Memoriał Andrzeja Trochanowskiego		Poland
