= Adam Wadecki =

Polish cyclist

Personal information
- Full name: Adam Wadecki
- Born: 23 December 1977 (age 48) Elbląg, Poland

Cycling career
- Sport: Cycling
- Current team: Las Vegas Power Energy Drink
- Discipline: Road
- Role: Rider
- Rider type: All-rounder, sprinter

Amateur teams
- 1997: Mlexer Elbląg
- 1998: Stal Grudziądz
- 1999: Mróz (stagiaire)
- 2011: Aktio Group–Mostostal Puławy
- 2013–: Las Vegas Power Energy Drink

Professional teams
- 2000: Servisco
- 2001–2002: Mróz–Supradyn Witaminy
- 2003: Action nVidia Mróz
- 2004–2005: Action ATI
- 2006: CCC–Polsat
- 2007: Ceramica Flaminia–Bossini Docce
- 2008: Kalev Sport
- 2009: Team Utensilnord
- 2010: Aktio Group–Mostostal Puławy
- 2012: BDC-Marcpol

Adam Wadecki (born 23 December 1977 in Elbląg, Poland) is a professional road racing cyclist. He entered professional cycling in 2000. He is the younger brother of professional cyclist, Piotr Wadecki.

== Team membership ==
Wadecki has been a member of numerous teams including Mlexer Elbląg (1997), Stal Grudziądz (1998), Mróz (1999), Servisco (Poland) (2000), Mróz (2001–2002), Action nVidia Mróz (2003), Action ATI (2004), Intel-Action (2005), CCC–Polsat (2006), and Ceramica Flaminia–Bossini Docce (Italy) (2007).

== Palmarès ==
1999
3rd Warsaw–Łódź

2000
2nd GP Weltour
10th Lubelski Wyscig 3-Majowy

2001
1st Memoriał Andrzeja Trochanowskiego
1st Wyscig Po Ziemi Kaliskiej
1st Stage 2a Szlakiem Grodów Piastowskich

2002
1st Stage 3 Szlakiem Grodów Piastowskich
2nd Poreč Trophy VI
3rd Memorial Pawla Sosika
7th Poreč Trophy II
8th Poreč Trophy I

2003
5th Puchar Ministra Obrony Narodowej
6th Coupe des Carpathes

2004
1st Overall Dookoła Mazowsza

1st Stage 3

1st Puchar Ministra Obrony Narodewej
1st Stage 3a Tour de Slovaquie

2005
1st National Road Race Championships
Course de la Solidarité Olympique

1st Stages 1, 3 & 4

1st Stage 5 Four Days of Dunkirk
10th Szlakiem Walk Majora Hubala

2006
3rd Pomorski Klasyk

2007
7th Pomorski Klasyk
8th Memorial Viviana Manservisi

2008
1st Stage 1 Dookoła Mazowsza
1st Stage 5 Tour de Slovaquie
7th Memoriał Andrzeja Trochanowskiego
8th Overall Szlakiem Walk Majora Hubala

1st Stage 4

8th Pomorski Klasyk
9th Overall Tour du Maroc

1st Stage 10

9th Tallinn–Tartu GP

2010
1st Stage 1 Course de la Solidarité Olympique
2nd Memoriał Andrzeja Trochanowskiego
5th Overall Dookoła Mazowsza
9th Pomerania Tour

2012
1st Stage 1 Dookoła Mazowsza
4th Memoriał Andrzeja Trochanowskiego
9th Banja Luka-Beograd I

2013
6th Puchar Ministra Obrony Narodowej
7th Memoriał Andrzeja Trochanowskiego
