= Krzysztof Ciesielski =

Polish cyclist

Personal information
- Born: 12 June 1974 (age 52) Kalisz, Poland

Cycling career
- Sport: Cycling
- Current team: Retired
- Discipline: Road
- Role: Rider

Professional teams
- 2000: Atlas–Lukullus
- 2001–2007: Servisco

Krzysztof Ciesielski (born 12 June 1974) is a Polish former road cyclist. Professional from 2000 to 2007, he most notably won the Raiffeisen Grand Prix in 2005 and competed in the road race and time trial at the 2004 UCI Road World Championships.

== Major results ==
1997
9th Overall Course Cycliste de Solidarnosc et des Champions Olympiques
2000
8th Overall Circuit des Mines
2004
2nd Time trial, National Road Championships
10th Memoriał Henryka Łasaka
2005
1st Raiffeisen Grand Prix
3rd Overall Bałtyk–Karkonosze Tour
7th Puchar Uzdrowisk Karpackich
2006
4th Memoriał Andrzeja Trochanowskiego
