= Eryk Latoń =

Polish cyclist

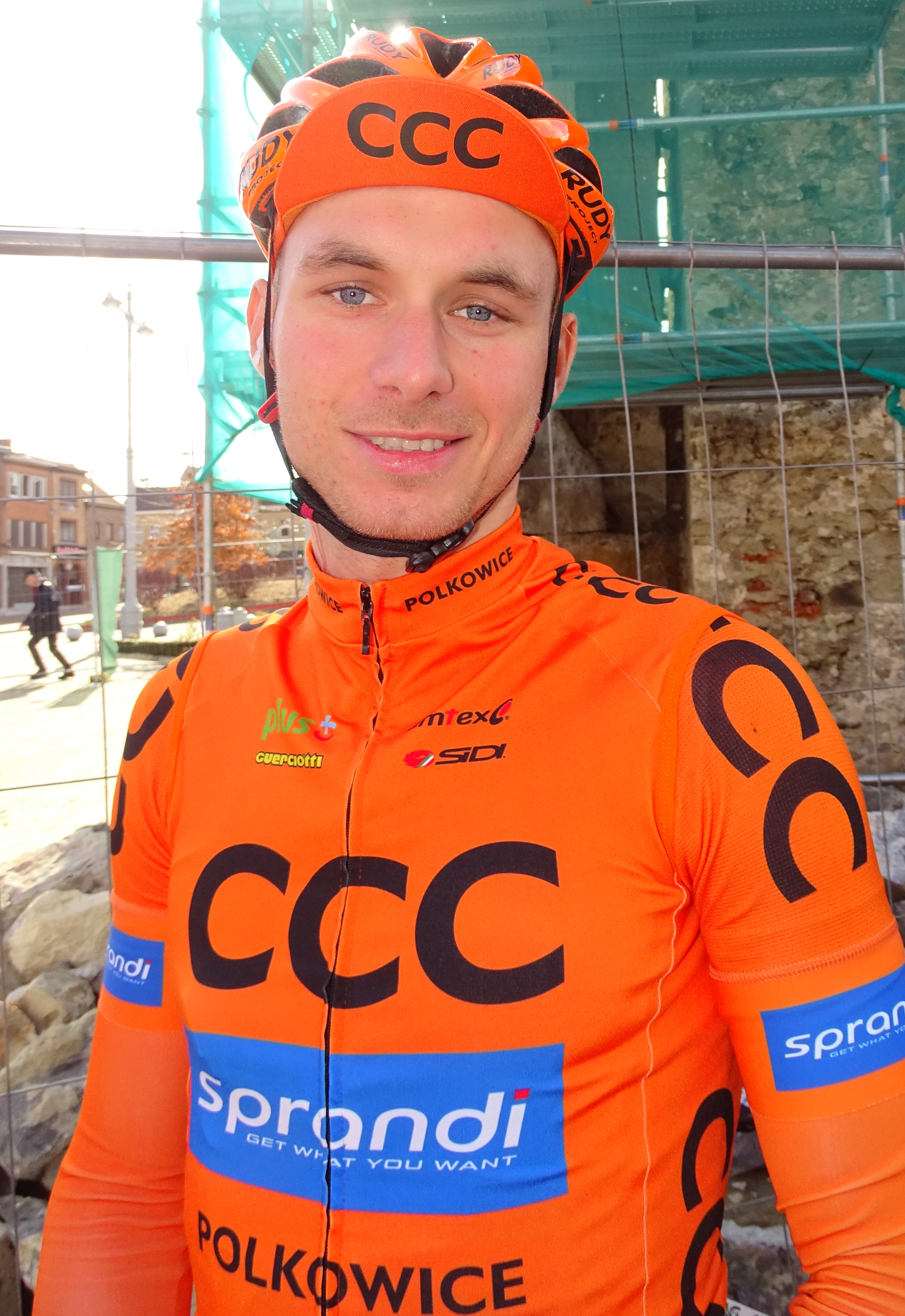
- Latoń in 2016.

Personal information
- Full name: Eryk Latoń
- Born: 22 August 1993 (age 33) Godziesze Małe, Poland
- Height: 1.84 m (6 ft 0 in)
- Weight: 76 kg (168 lb)

Cycling career
- Sport: Cycling
- Discipline: Road
- Role: Rider

Professional teams
- 2012–2014: BDC–Marcpol Team
- 2015–2016: CCC–Sprandi–Polkowice
- 2017–2018: Team Hurom

Eryk Latoń (born 22 August 1993) is a Polish professional racing cyclist, who most recently rode for UCI Continental team, Team Hurom.

== Major results ==
2014
2nd Overall Dookoła Mazowsza

1st Sprints classification
1st Stage 6

8th Memoriał Andrzeja Trochanowskiego
8th Race Horizon Park 2
2016
2nd Puchar Ministra Obrony Narodowej
9th Clásica de Almería
10th Memorial Grundmanna I Wizowskiego
2017
2nd Puchar Ministra Obrony Narodowej
3rd Memoriał Andrzeja Trochanowskiego
4th Overall Dookoła Mazowsza
2018
3rd Grand Prix Poland
4th Overall Belgrade–Banja Luka
4th Memoriał Romana Siemińskiego
