= Dariusz Batek =

Polish cyclist

Personal information
- Full name: Dariusz Batek
- Born: 27 April 1986 (age 40) Oświęcim, Poland

Cycling career
- Sport: Cycling
- Current team: Retired
- Discipline: Road
- Role: Rider

Amateur team
- 2017: Mazowsze–LZS

Professional teams
- 2010–2012: CCC–Polsat–Polkowice
- 2013: Bank BGŻ
- 2015–2016: Wibatech–Fuji

Dariusz Batek (born 27 April 1986 in Oświęcim) is a Polish former professional cyclist.

== Major results ==
2007
2nd Time trial, National Under-23 Road Championships
2008
4th Time trial, National Under-23 Road Championships
2009
7th Overall Tour of Małopolska
2010
2nd Szlakiem Walk Majora Hubala
6th Overall Tour of Małopolska
9th Time trial, National Road Championships
2015
4th Overall Szlakiem Grodów Piastowskich
4th Visegrad 4 Bicycle Race – GP Czech Republic
4th Race Horizon Park Maidan
6th Overall Tour of Małopolska
6th Visegrad 4 Bicycle Race – GP Polski
7th Overall Course de Solidarność et des Champions Olympiques
8th Race Horizon Park Classic
2016
2nd Visegrad 4 Bicycle Race – GP Kerékpárverseny
3rd Visegrad 4 Bicycle Race – GP Polski
4th Overall Szlakiem Grodów Piastowskich

1st Points classification

4th Visegrad 4 Bicycle Race – GP Slovakia
4th Race Horizon Park Race for Peace
8th Overall Tour of Małopolska

1st Stage 1
