= Robert Radosz =

Polish cyclist

Personal information
- Full name: Robert Radosz
- Born: 8 July 1975 (age 51) Sławno, Poland

Cycling career
- Sport: Cycling
- Current team: Retired
- Discipline: Road
- Role: Rider

Amateur team
- 2008: Mróz–Action–UNIQA

Professional teams
- 2000–2001: Atlas
- 2002–2003: Servisco–Koop
- 2004–2005: Grupa PSB
- 2006: DHL–Author
- 2007: Intel–Action
- 2009: DHL–Author
- 2010: Aktio Group
- 2011–2014: BDC Team

Robert Radosz (born 8 July 1975) is a Polish former cyclist, who rode professionally between 2000 and 2014.

== Major results ==
2000
1st Overall Bałtyk–Karkonosze Tour
9th Overall Course de Solidarność et des Champions Olympiques
2001
2nd Memoriał Andrzeja Trochanowskiego
2003
1st Stage 8 Bałtyk–Karkonosze Tour
2nd Memoriał Henryka Łasaka
5th Szlakiem Walk Majora Hubala
2004
1st Memoriał Henryka Łasaka
1st Stage 7 Bałtyk–Karkonosze Tour
3rd Overall Tour of Małopolska
6th Memoriał Andrzeja Trochanowskiego
7th Grand Prix Kooperativa
8th Overall Course de la Solidarité Olympique

1st Stage 2

2005
1st Stage 4a Dookoła Mazowsza
1st Stage 3 Tour of Małopolska
1st Stage 4b Okolo Slovenska
1st Stage 7 Tour of Bulgaria
3rd Puchar Ministra Obrony Narodowej
5th Neuseen Classics
7th Overall Szlakiem Grodów Piastowskich
8th Overall Bałtyk–Karkonosze Tour
9th Memoriał Andrzeja Trochanowskiego
2006
1st Overall Course de la Solidarité Olympique

1st Stage 1

1st Stage 3 Tour of Małopolska
1st Stage 4 Tour of Bulgaria
5th Szlakiem Walk Majora Hubala
6th Overall Dookoła Mazowsza
2007
1st Overall Tour of Hainan

1st Stages 5 & 7

3rd Road race, National Road Championships
4th Overall Szlakiem Grodów Piastowskich

1st Stage 4

6th Overall Bałtyk–Karkonosze Tour
7th Overall Course de Solidarność et des Champions Olympiques
2008
4th Puchar Ministra Obrony Narodowej
6th Overall Tour of Japan
7th Overall Tour of Małopolska
10th Coupe des Carpathes
2009
2nd Overall Dookoła Mazowsza
6th Overall Bałtyk–Karkonosze Tour
6th Overall Tour of Małopolska
8th Memoriał Andrzeja Trochanowskiego
8th Memoriał Henryka Łasaka
9th Overall Course de Solidarność et des Champions Olympiques
9th Puchar Ministra Obrony Narodowej
2010
3rd Grand Prix Jasnej Góry
2011
1st Overall Bałtyk–Karkonosze Tour

1st Stage 5

1st Overall Dookoła Mazowsza

1st Stage 2

4th Memoriał Andrzeja Trochanowskiego
9th Overall Tour of Małopolska

1st Stage 3

2012
3rd Overall Bałtyk–Karkonosze Tour

1st Stage 8

3rd Coupe des Carpathes
6th Overall Tour of Bulgaria
9th Overall Tour of Małopolska
9th Overall Dookoła Mazowsza
9th Puchar Ministra Obrony Narodowej
2013
2nd Overall Dookoła Mazowsza

1st Stage 4 (TTT)

8th Puchar Ministra Obrony Narodowej
2014
6th Visegrad 4 Bicycle Race – GP Slovakia
8th Coupe des Carpathes
10th Overall Tour of Estonia
