= Jacek Morajko =

Polish racing cyclist

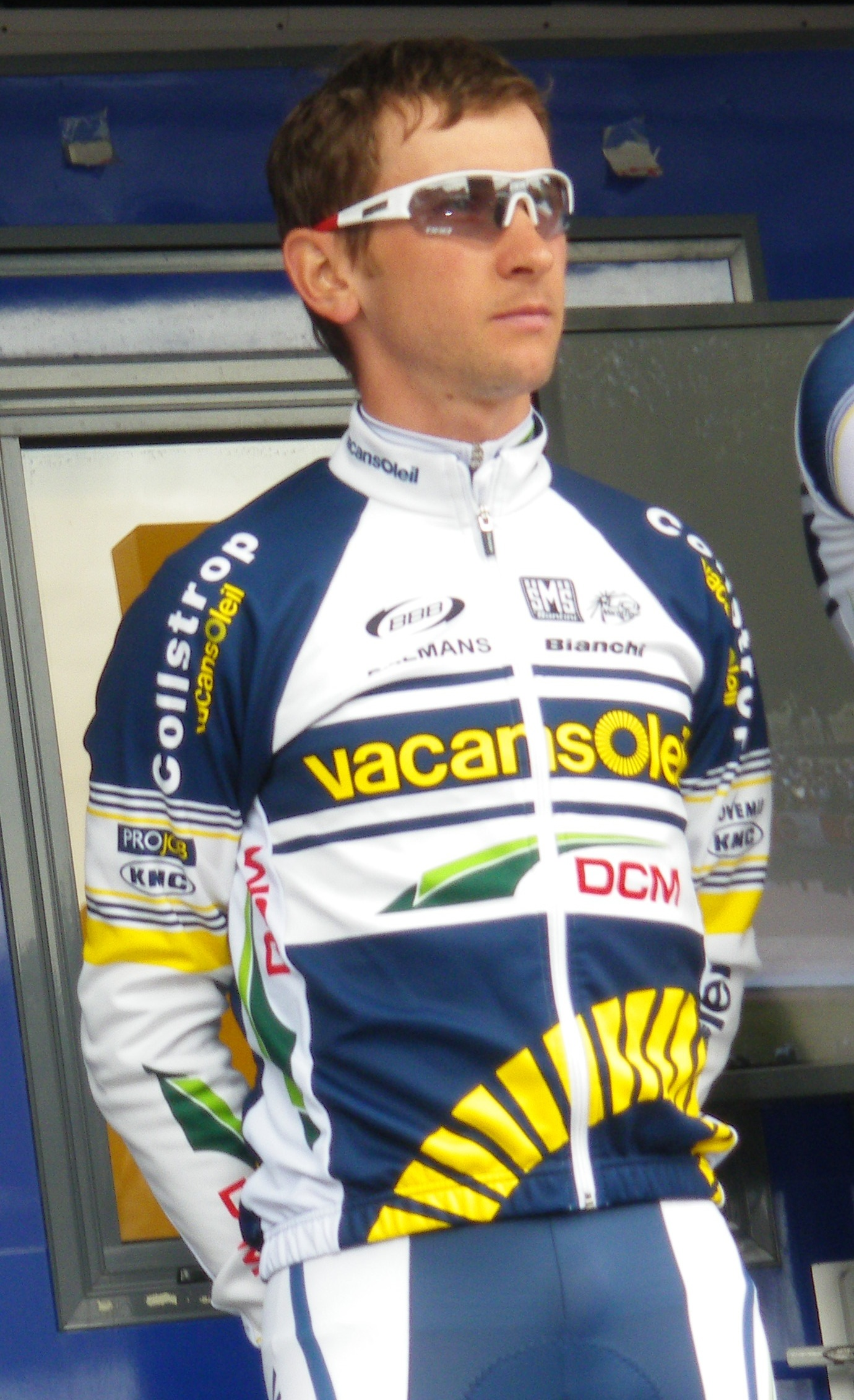
- Morajko at the 2012 Four Days of Dunkirk

Personal information
- Full name: Jacek Tadeusz Morajko
- Born: 26 April 1981 (age 45) Opole, Poland

Cycling career
- Sport: Cycling
- Current team: Voster Team
- Discipline: Road
- Role: Rider (retired); Directeur sportif

Professional teams
- 2003–2004: Antarte–Rota dos Móveis
- 2005–2008: Carvalhelhos–Boavista
- 2009–2010: Mróz Continental Team
- 2011: CCC–Polsat–Polkowice
- 2012: Vacansoleil–DCM
- 2013–2014: CCC–Polsat–Polkowice
- 2015–2018: Wibatech–Fuji

Managerial team
- 2019–: Voster ATS Team

Major wins
- National Road Race Championships (2010); Course de la Solidarité Olympique (2010); Tour of Małopolska (2010)

Jacek Tadeusz Morajko (born 26 April 1981) is a Polish former road racing cyclist, who rode professionally between 2003 and 2018 for the Antarte–Rota dos Móveis, Madeinox–Boavista, Mróz–Active Jet, Vacansoleil–DCM, CCC–Polsat–Polkowice (two spells) and Wibatech Merx 7R teams. He now works as a directeur sportif for UCI Continental team Voster Team.

Born in Opole, Morajko made his professional debut in 2003 for the team Antarte–Rota dos Móveis. In 2007, he was finished second at the Polish National Road Race Championships. Three years later, he won the road race and also two stages and the general classification of the Course de la Solidarité Olympique and the Tour of Małopolska. In 2011, he won the Coupe des Carpathes.

In 2008, he finished 54th at the road race of the 2008 Summer Olympics in Beijing.

== Major results ==
2002
2nd Grand Prix Cristal Energie
9th GP Ostrowca Swietokrzyskiego
2003
3rd Wielkanocny Wyścig o Puchar Wójta Gminy Kłomnice
2004
4th GP Ciudad de Vigo
2006
1st GP Area Metropolitana de Vigo
3rd GP Ciudad de Vigo
2007
2nd Road race, National Road Championships
4th Overall Beijing 2008 Test Event
2008
1st Puchar Wojta Gminy Chrzastowice
6th Overall Tour of Hainan
2009
2nd Overall Tour of Małopolska
2nd Coupe des Carpathes
5th Overall Tour de Slovaquie
6th Rund um die Nürnberger Altstadt
9th Overall Szlakiem Grodów Piastowskich

1st Stage 2

10th Overall Course de la Solidarité Olympique
2010
1st Road race, National Road Championships
1st Overall Tour of Małopolska
1st Overall Course de la Solidarité Olympique

1st Stages 4 & 5

3rd Coupe des Carpathes
2011
1st Coupe des Carpathes
2013
3rd Coupe des Carpathes
5th Overall Tour of Małopolska
2014
1st Stage 5 Course de la Solidarité Olympique
1st Stage 3a (TTT) Sibiu Cycling Tour
1st Stage 1 (TTT) Dookoła Mazowsza
2015
7th Coupe des Carpathes
2016
2nd Race Horizon Park for Peace
2017
1st Mountains classification East Bohemia Tour
4th Coupe des Carpathes
5th Korona Kocich Gór
6th Race Horizon Park for Peace
