= 2010 Tour de Pologne =

Cycling race

2010 UCI World Ranking, race 19 of 26

Race details
- Dates: 1 – 7 August
- Stages: 7
- Distance: 1,256.5 km (780.8 mi)
- Winning time: 30h 38' 48"

Results
Jersey awarded to the overall winner	Winner	Dan Martin (IRL)	(Garmin–Transitions)
	Second	Grega Bole (SVN)	(Lampre–Farnese)
	Third	Bauke Mollema (NED)	(Rabobank)
Jersey awarded to the points classification winner	Points	Allan Davis (AUS)	(Astana)
Jersey awarded to the mountains classification winner	Mountains	Johnny Hoogerland (NED)	(Vacansoleil)
Jersey awarded to the sprints classification winner	Sprints	Johnny Hoogerland (NED)	(Vacansoleil)
	Team	Garmin–Transitions	

The 2010 Tour de Pologne was the 67th running of the Tour de Pologne, in the 82nd year since the first edition. The event was part of both the 2010 UCI ProTour and the World Calendar. It ran from 1 to 7 August and commenced in Sochaczew and finished in Kraków.

== Teams ==
Twenty three teams have been invited to the 2010 Tour de Pologne.

Teams from the UCI Pro Tour

- Ag2r–La Mondiale
- Astana
- Caisse d'Epargne
- Euskaltel–Euskadi
- Footon–Servetto–Fuji
- Française des Jeux
- Garmin–Transitions
- Lampre–Farnese
- Liquigas–Doimo
- Omega Pharma–Lotto
- Quick-Step
- Rabobank
- Team Sky
- Team HTC–Columbia
- Team Katusha
- Team Milram
- Team RadioShack
- Team Saxo Bank

Teams awarded a wildcard invitation

- Team Poland
- Vacansoleil
- Cervélo TestTeam
- BMC Racing Team
- Skil–Shimano

== Stages ==
Aside from entering the Czech Republic (to the city of Český Těšín on the border with Poland) during the fourth stage, the race stages started and ended in Polish locations.

Stage	Date	Course	Distance	Type	Winner
1	1 August	Sochaczew to Warsaw	175.1 km (108.8 mi)	Flat stage	Jacopo Guarnieri (ITA)
2	2 August	Rawa Mazowiecka to Dąbrowa Górnicza	240.0 km (149.1 mi)	Flat stage	André Greipel (GER)
3	3 August	Sosnowiec to Katowice	122.1 km (75.9 mi)	Flat stage	Yauheni Hutarovich (BLR)
4	4 August	Tychy to Cieszyn	177.9 km (110.5 mi)	Medium-mountain stage	Mirco Lorenzetto (ITA)
5	5 August	Jastrzębie-Zdrój to Ustroń	149.0 km (92.6 mi)	Mountain stage	Dan Martin (IRL)
6	6 August	Oświęcim to Bukowina Tatrzańska	228.5 km (142.0 mi)	Mountain stage	Bauke Mollema (NED)
7	7 August	Nowy Targ to Kraków	163.9 km (101.8 mi)	Medium-mountain stage	André Greipel (GER)

=== Stage 1 ===
1 August 2010 – Sochaczew to Warsaw, 175.1 km (108.8 mi)

Stage 1 Result

	Rider	Team	Time
1	Jacopo Guarnieri (ITA)	Liquigas–Doimo	4h 05' 32"
2	Aitor Galdós (ESP)	Euskaltel–Euskadi	s.t.
3	Allan Davis (AUS)	Astana	s.t.
4	Sébastien Chavanel (FRA)	FDJ	s.t.
5	Jarosław Marycz (POL)	Team Saxo Bank	s.t.
6	Christopher Sutton (AUS)	Team Sky	s.t.
7	Alexander Kristoff (NOR)	BMC Racing Team	s.t.
8	Marcel Sieberg (GER)	Team HTC–Columbia	s.t.
9	Wouter Weylandt (BEL)	Quick-Step	s.t.
10	Mathieu Drujon (FRA)	Caisse d'Epargne	s.t.

General Classification after Stage 1

	Rider	Team	Time
1	Jacopo Guarnieri (ITA)	Liquigas–Doimo	4h 05' 22"
2	Aitor Galdós (ESP)	Euskaltel–Euskadi	+ 4"
3	Błażej Janiaczyk (POL)	Team Poland	+ 4"
4	Michael Schär (SUI)	BMC Racing Team	+ 5"
5	László Bodrogi (FRA)	Team Katusha	+ 5"
6	Allan Davis (AUS)	Astana	+ 6"
7	Daniel Sesma (ESP)	Euskaltel–Euskadi	+ 8"
8	Sébastien Chavanel (FRA)	FDJ	+ 10"
9	Jarosław Marycz (POL)	Team Saxo Bank	+ 10"
10	Christopher Sutton (AUS)	Team Sky	+ 10"

=== Stage 2 ===
2 August 2010 – Rawa Mazowiecka to Dąbrowa Górnicza, 240 km (149.1 mi)

Stage 2 Result

	Rider	Team	Time
1	André Greipel (GER)	Team HTC–Columbia	6h 02' 52"
2	Allan Davis (AUS)	Astana	s.t.
3	Wouter Weylandt (BEL)	Quick-Step	s.t.
4	Christopher Sutton (AUS)	Team Sky	s.t.
5	Borut Božič (SLO)	Vacansoleil	s.t.
6	Kenny Dehaes (BEL)	Omega Pharma–Lotto	s.t.
7	Lucas Sebastián Haedo (ARG)	Team Saxo Bank	s.t.
8	Alexander Kristoff (NOR)	BMC Racing Team	s.t.
9	Yauheni Hutarovich (BLR)	FDJ	s.t.
10	Angelo Furlan (ITA)	Lampre–Farnese	s.t.

General Classification after Stage 2

	Rider	Team	Time
1	Allan Davis (AUS)	Astana	10h 08' 14"
2	Jacopo Guarnieri (ITA)	Liquigas–Doimo	+ 0"
3	André Greipel (GER)	Team HTC–Columbia	+ 0"
4	Aitor Galdós (ESP)	Euskaltel–Euskadi	+ 4"
5	Błażej Janiaczyk (POL)	Team Poland	+ 4"
6	Michael Schär (SUI)	BMC Racing Team	+ 5"
7	Bartłomiej Matysiak (POL)	Team Poland	+ 5"
8	László Bodrogi (FRA)	Team Katusha	+ 5"
9	Wouter Weylandt (BEL)	Quick-Step	+ 6"
10	Marcin Sapa (POL)	Lampre–Farnese	+ 6"

=== Stage 3 ===
3 August 2010 – Sosnowiec to Katowice, 122.1 km (75.9 mi)

Stage 3 Result

	Rider	Team	Time
1	Yauheni Hutarovich (BLR)	FDJ	2h 45' 04"
2	Lucas Sebastián Haedo (ARG)	Team Saxo Bank	s.t.
3	Allan Davis (AUS)	Astana	s.t.
4	Tom Veelers (NED)	Skil–Shimano	s.t.
5	Kenny Dehaes (BEL)	Omega Pharma–Lotto	s.t.
6	Wouter Weylandt (BEL)	Quick-Step	s.t.
7	Borut Božič (SLO)	Vacansoleil	s.t.
8	Robert Förster (GER)	Team Milram	s.t.
9	Graeme Brown (AUS)	Rabobank	s.t.
10	Alexander Kristoff (NOR)	BMC Racing Team	s.t.

General Classification after Stage 3

	Rider	Team	Time
1	Allan Davis (AUS)	Astana	12h 53' 14"
2	André Greipel (GER)	Team HTC–Columbia	+ 3"
3	Jacopo Guarnieri (ITA)	Liquigas–Doimo	+ 4"
4	Yauheni Hutarovich (BLR)	FDJ	+ 4"
5	Aitor Galdós (ESP)	Euskaltel–Euskadi	+ 8"
6	Lucas Sebastián Haedo (ARG)	Team Saxo Bank	+ 8"
7	Błażej Janiaczyk (POL)	Team Poland	+ 8"
8	Michael Schär (SUI)	BMC Racing Team	+ 9"
9	Bartłomiej Matysiak (POL)	Team Poland	+ 9"
10	László Bodrogi (FRA)	Team Katusha	+ 9"

=== Stage 4 ===
4 August 2010 – Tychy to Cieszyn, 177.9 km (110.5 mi)

Stage 4 Result

	Rider	Team	Time
1	Mirco Lorenzetto (ITA)	Lampre–Farnese	4h 07' 36"
2	Grega Bole (SLO)	Lampre–Farnese	s.t.
3	Alessandro Ballan (ITA)	BMC Racing Team	s.t.
4	Simon Geschke (GER)	Skil–Shimano	s.t.
5	Sergey Lagutin (UZB)	Vacansoleil	+ 2"
6	Michael Albasini (SUI)	Team HTC–Columbia	+ 2"
7	Mathew Hayman (AUS)	Team Sky	+ 2"
8	Martin Pedersen (DEN)	Footon–Servetto–Fuji	+ 4"
9	Pablo Lastras (ESP)	Caisse d'Epargne	+ 4"
10	Marek Rutkiewicz (POL)	Team Poland	+ 4"

General Classification after Stage 4

	Rider	Team	Time
1	Mirco Lorenzetto (ITA)	Lampre–Farnese	17h 00' 51"
2	Grega Bole (SLO)	Lampre–Farnese	+ 7"
3	Alessandro Ballan (ITA)	BMC Racing Team	+ 8"
4	Simon Geschke (GER)	Skil–Shimano	+ 10"
5	Kenny Dehaes (BEL)	Omega Pharma–Lotto	+ 14"
6	Pablo Lastras (ESP)	Caisse d'Epargne	+ 15"
7	Sergey Lagutin (UZB)	Vacansoleil	+ 15"
8	Mathew Hayman (AUS)	Team Sky	+ 15"
9	Paul Voss (GER)	Team Milram	+ 15"
10	Michael Albasini (SUI)	Team HTC–Columbia	+ 15"

=== Stage 5 ===
5 August 2010 – Jastrzębie-Zdrój to Ustroń, 149 km (92.6 mi)

Stage 5 Result

	Rider	Team	Time
1	Dan Martin (IRL)	Garmin–Transitions	3h 51' 13"
2	Grega Bole (SLO)	Lampre–Farnese	+ 20"
3	Sylwester Szmyd (POL)	Liquigas–Doimo	+ 20"
4	Mauro Santambrogio (ITA)	BMC Racing Team	+ 20"
5	Diego Ulissi (ITA)	Lampre–Farnese	+ 20"
6	Bauke Mollema (NED)	Rabobank	+ 20"
7	Michael Albasini (SUI)	Team HTC–Columbia	+ 20"
8	Marek Rutkiewicz (POL)	Team Poland	+ 20"
9	Tom Danielson (USA)	Garmin–Transitions	+ 20"
10	Alessandro Ballan (ITA)	BMC Racing Team	+ 20"

General Classification after Stage 5

	Rider	Team	Time
1	Dan Martin (IRL)	Garmin–Transitions	20h 52' 11"
2	Grega Bole (SLO)	Lampre–Farnese	+ 14"
3	Alessandro Ballan (ITA)	BMC Racing Team	+ 21"
4	Sylwester Szmyd (POL)	Liquigas–Doimo	+ 26"
5	Michael Albasini (SUI)	Team HTC–Columbia	+ 28"
6	Bauke Mollema (NED)	Rabobank	+ 29"
7	Marek Rutkiewicz (POL)	Team Poland	+ 30"
8	Diego Ulissi (ITA)	Lampre–Farnese	+ 30"
9	Mauro Santambrogio (ITA)	BMC Racing Team	+ 30"
10	Tom Danielson (USA)	Garmin–Transitions	+ 30"

=== Stage 6 ===
6 August 2010 – Oświęcim to Bukowina Tatrzańska, 228.5 km (142.0 mi)

Stage 6 Result

	Rider	Team	Time
1	Bauke Mollema (NED)	Rabobank	5h 54' 30"
2	Michael Albasini (SUI)	Team HTC–Columbia	+ 7"
3	Grega Bole (SLO)	Lampre–Farnese	+ 7"
4	Mauro Santambrogio (ITA)	BMC Racing Team	+ 7"
5	Tiago Machado (POR)	Team RadioShack	+ 9"
6	Alessandro Ballan (ITA)	BMC Racing Team	+ 9"
7	Dan Martin (IRL)	Garmin–Transitions	+ 9"
8	Lars Petter Nordhaug (NOR)	Team Sky	+ 9"
9	Sylwester Szmyd (POL)	Liquigas–Doimo	+ 9"
10	Marek Rutkiewicz (POL)	Team Poland	+ 9"

General Classification after Stage 6

	Rider	Team	Time
1	Dan Martin (IRL)	Garmin–Transitions	26h 46' 50"
2	Grega Bole (SLO)	Lampre–Farnese	+ 8"
3	Bauke Mollema (NED)	Rabobank	+ 10"
4	Michael Albasini (SUI)	Team HTC–Columbia	+ 20"
5	Alessandro Ballan (ITA)	BMC Racing Team	+ 21"
6	Sylwester Szmyd (POL)	Liquigas–Doimo	+ 26"
7	Mauro Santambrogio (ITA)	BMC Racing Team	+ 28"
8	Marek Rutkiewicz (POL)	Team Poland	+ 30"
9	Diego Ulissi (ITA)	Lampre–Farnese	+ 30"
10	Tom Danielson (USA)	Garmin–Transitions	+ 33"

=== Stage 7 ===
7 August 2010 – Nowy Targ to Kraków, 163.9 km (101.8 mi)

Stage 7 Result

	Rider	Team	Time
1	André Greipel (GER)	Team HTC–Columbia	3h 51' 58"
2	Yauheni Hutarovich (BLR)	FDJ	s.t.
3	Robert Förster (GER)	Team Milram	s.t.
4	Daniele Bennati (ITA)	Liquigas–Doimo	s.t.
5	Wouter Weylandt (BEL)	Quick-Step	s.t.
6	Alexander Kristoff (NOR)	BMC Racing Team	s.t.
7	Sébastien Hinault (FRA)	Ag2r–La Mondiale	s.t.
8	Ben Swift (GBR)	Team Sky	s.t.
9	Allan Davis (AUS)	Astana	s.t.
10	David Vitoria (SUI)	Footon–Servetto–Fuji	s.t.

Final General Classification

	Rider	Team	Time
1	Dan Martin (IRL)	Garmin–Transitions	30h 38' 48"
2	Grega Bole (SLO)	Lampre–Farnese	+ 8"
3	Bauke Mollema (NED)	Rabobank	+ 10"
4	Michael Albasini (SUI)	Team HTC–Columbia	+ 20"
5	Alessandro Ballan (ITA)	BMC Racing Team	+ 21"
6	Sylwester Szmyd (POL)	Liquigas–Doimo	+ 26"
7	Marek Rutkiewicz (POL)	Team Poland	+ 30"
8	Diego Ulissi (ITA)	Lampre–Farnese	+ 30"
9	Tom Danielson (USA)	Garmin–Transitions	+ 33"
10	Tiago Machado (POR)	Team RadioShack	+ 41"

== Category leadership table ==
Stage	Winner	General classification Żółta koszulka	Mountains classification Klasyfikacja górska	Intermediate Sprints Classification Klasyfikacja najaktywniejszych	Points classification Klasyfikacja punktowa	Teams classification
1	Jacopo Guarnieri	Jacopo Guarnieri	Łukasz Bodnar	Błażej Janiaczyk	Jacopo Guarnieri	Team Sky
2	André Greipel	Allan Davis	Marcin Sapa	Błażej Janiaczyk	Allan Davis	Team Sky
3	Yauheni Hutarovich	Allan Davis	Dominique Rollin	Błażej Janiaczyk	Allan Davis	Team Sky
4	Mirco Lorenzetto	Mirco Lorenzetto	Johnny Hoogerland	Błażej Janiaczyk	Allan Davis	Lampre–Farnese
5	Dan Martin	Dan Martin	Johnny Hoogerland	Błażej Janiaczyk	Allan Davis	Garmin–Transitions
6	Bauke Mollema	Dan Martin	Johnny Hoogerland	Johnny Hoogerland	Grega Bole	Garmin–Transitions
7	André Greipel	Dan Martin	Johnny Hoogerland	Johnny Hoogerland	Allan Davis	Garmin–Transitions
Final		Dan Martin	Johnny Hoogerland	Johnny Hoogerland	Allan Davis	Garmin–Transitions
