= Wrona =

Wrona (Polish pronunciation: [ˈvrɔna]) is a surname of Polish-language origin, meaning crow. It may refer to:

- Leszek Wrona (born 1955), Polish footballer
- Marcin Wrona (1973–2015), Polish director
- Marek Wrona, Polish cyclist
- Michael Wrona (born 1966), Australian horse-racing announcer
- Rick Wrona (born 1963), baseball player
- Tadeusz Wrona (disambiguation), multiple people
- Zdzisław Wrona, Polish cyclist

== See also ==
- Nowa Wrona, Gmina Nasielsk, Nowy Dwór County, Masovian Voivodeship
- Nowa Wrona, Płońsk County, Masovian Voivodeship
