= Piotr Gawroński =

Polish bicycle racer

Personal information
- Full name: Piotr Gawroński
- Born: 25 March 1990 (age 36)

Cycling career
- Sport: Cycling
- Current team: Retired
- Discipline: Road
- Role: Rider

Professional team
- 2012–2014: CCC–Polkowice

Piotr Gawroński (born 25 March 1990) is a Polish former cyclist, who rode professionally between 2012 and 2014 for the CCC–Polsat–Polkowice team.

== Major results ==
2007
3rd Time trial, UEC European Junior Road Championships
2008
1st Stage 1 Peace Race Juniors
3rd Road race, UEC European Junior Road Championships
2010
1st Road race, UEC European Under-23 Road Championships
2012
1st Prologue Bałtyk–Karkonosze Tour
1st Young rider classification Szlakiem Grodów Piastowskich
2014
1st Stage 1 (TTT) Dookoła Mazowsza
