= Mateusz Nowak =

Polish cyclist

Personal information
- Born: 15 July 1992 (age 34)

Cycling career
- Sport: Cycling
- Discipline: Road
- Role: Rider

Professional teams
- 2013–2014: CCC–Polsat–Polkowice
- 2015–2016: Domin Sport

Mateusz Nowak (born 15 July 1992) is a Polish former professional cyclist.

== Major results ==
2010
1st Time trial, National Junior Road Championships
2011
7th Memoriał Andrzeja Trochanowskiego
2012
2nd Overall Dookoła Mazowsza

1st Young rider classification

2014
9th Visegrad 4 Bicycle Race – GP Polski
2015
1st Omnium, National Under-23 Track Championships
1st Memoriał Andrzeja Trochanowskiego
4th Memoriał Romana Siemińskiego
4th Puchar Ministra Obrony Narodowej
5th Overall Dookoła Mazowsza
