= Memoriał Romana Siemińskiego =

Polish one-day road cycling race

Race details
- Date: May
- Region: Masovian Voivodeship, Poland
- English name: Memorial of Roman Sieminski
- Discipline: Road
- Competition: UCI Europe Tour
- Type: Single-day race
- Organiser: Klub Kolarski Legia 1928
- Race director: Marcin Wasiołek

History
- First edition: 1998
- Editions: 20 (as of 2019)
- First winner: Piotr Wadecki (POL)
- Most wins: Alois Kaňkovský (CZE) (4 wins)
- Most recent: Alois Kaňkovský (CZE)

The Memoriał Romana Siemińskiego is a one-day cycling race held in the Masovian Voivodeship, Poland. It was first held in 1998 and has been part of the UCI Europe Tour in category 1.2.

== Winners ==
Year	Country	Rider	Team
1998	Poland	Piotr Wadecki	Mróz
1999	No race		
2000	Poland	Bartłomiej Ksobiak	Atlas–Lukullus–Ambra
2001	Poland	Piotr Zaradny	Atlas–Ambra–Lukullus
2002	Poland	Robert Radosz	Servisco–Koop
2003	No race		
2004	Poland	Łukasz Podolski	Grupa PSB
2005	Poland	Mariusz Wiesiak	Team Nippo
2006	Poland	Marcin Gębka	DHL–Author
2007	Slovakia	Roman Broniś	DHL–Author
2008	Poland	Piotr Zaradny	DHL–Author
2009	Poland	Wojciech Halejak	DHL–Author
2010	Poland	Wojciech Ziółkowski	DHL–Author
2011	Poland	Robert Radosz	BDC Team
2012	Germany	Rick Ampler	Nutrixxion–Abus
2013	Poland	Tomasz Smoleń	Bank BGŻ
2014	Poland	Eryk Latoń	BDC Marcpol
2015	Czech Republic	Alois Kaňkovský	Whirlpool–Author
2016	Ukraine	Mykhaylo Kononenko	Kolss BDC Team
2017	Czech Republic	Alois Kaňkovský	Elkov–Author
2018	Czech Republic	Alois Kaňkovský	Elkov–Author
2019	Czech Republic	Alois Kaňkovský	Elkov–Author
