= 2000 Tour de Pologne =

Cycling race

Race details
- Dates: 4–10 September 2000
- Stages: 7
- Distance: 1,171 km (727.6 mi)
- Winning time: 27h 44' 37"

Results
	Winner	Piotr Przydział (POL)
	Second	Piotr Wadecki (POL)
	Third	Sergei Ivanov (RUS)

The 2000 Tour de Pologne was the 57th edition of the Tour de Pologne cycle race and was held from 4 September to 10 September 2000. The race started in Braniewo and finished in Karpacz. The race was won by Piotr Przydział.

== General classification ==
Final general classification

Rank	Rider	Time
1	Piotr Przydział (POL)	27h 44' 37"
2	Piotr Wadecki (POL)	+ 7"
3	Sergei Ivanov (RUS)	+ 1' 26"
4	Viatcheslav Ekimov (RUS)	+ 2' 04"
5	Miguel Ángel Martín Perdiguero (ESP)	+ 2' 08"
6	Aitor González (ESP)	+ 3' 29"
7	Kurt Van De Wouwer (BEL)	+ 3' 43"
8	Dario Andriotto (ITA)	+ 3' 54"
9	Cezary Zamana (POL)	+ 4' 29"
10	Radosław Romanik (POL)	+ 4' 30"
