= Radosław Romanik =

Polish cyclist

Personal information
- Born: 16 January 1967 (age 59) Kamienna Góra, Poland

Cycling career
- Sport: Cycling
- Current team: Retired
- Discipline: Road
- Role: Rider

Professional teams
- 2000–2004: Mat–Ceresit–CCC
- 2005–2011: DHL–Author

Radosław Romanik (born 16 January 1967 in Kamienna Góra) is a Polish former professional road cyclist.

== Major results ==
1993
1st Overall Bałtyk–Karkonosze Tour
1994
1st Overall Bałtyk–Karkonosze Tour
1995
1st Overall Bałtyk–Karkonosze Tour
1996
1st Overall Bałtyk–Karkonosze Tour
1997
1st Stage 1 TV Wisła Tour
2000
1st Stage 5a Bałtyk–Karkonosze Tour
2001
1st Road race, National Road Championships
2nd Overall Bałtyk–Karkonosze Tour
1st Stage 7
3rd Overall Peace Race
2002
1st Overall Małopolski Wyścig Górski
1st Overall Course de la Solidarité Olympique
3rd Overall Bałtyk–Karkonosze Tour
2003
3rd Overall Małopolski Wyścig Górski
1st Stage 4
2004
1st Stage 4 Tour de Beauce
3rd Overall Settimana Ciclistica Lombarda
2005
1st Coupe des Carpathes
1st Overall Bałtyk–Karkonosze Tour

1st Stage 5

1st GP Jasnej Góry
1st Ogólnopolski Wyścig z Okazji Dnia Dziecka
1st Stage 2 Małopolski Wyścig Górski
2nd Szlakiem Grodów Piastowskich
3rd Overall Małopolski Wyścig Górski
2006
1st Overall Okolo Slovenska

1st Stage 4a

2nd Grand Prix Hydraulika Mikolasek
2007
1st Stage 6 Bałtyk–Karkonosze Tour
2nd Overall Małopolski Wyścig Górski
2008
1st Overall Bałtyk–Karkonosze Tour
1st Stage 5 Dookoła Mazowsza (TTT)
2nd Puchar Ministra Obrony Narodowej
2009
3rd Overall Course de la Solidarité Olympique
2011
2nd Puchar Ministra Obrony Narodowej
