= Memorial Grundmanna I Wizowskiego =

Polish one-day road cycling race

Race details
- Date: June
- Region: Poland
- Discipline: Road
- Competition: UCI Europe Tour (until 2019)
- Type: Single-day race

History
- First edition: 1984
- Editions: 32 (as of 2022)
- First winner: Ryszard Szurkowski (POL)
- Most wins: 4 riders with 2 wins (Note: The two-time race winners are Polish riders Dariusz Baranowski, Daniel Czajkowski and Bartosz Rudyk, and Vojtěch Hačecký from the Czech Republic.)
- Most recent: Tobiasz Pawlak (POL)

The Memorial Grundmanna I Wizowskiego is a one-day cycling race held in Poland. It was previously part of the UCI Europe Tour as a category 1.2 race. In 2014, it was rated 2.2.

== Winners ==
Year	Country	Rider	Team
1984	Poland	Ryszard Szurkowski	
1985– 1990	No race		
1991	Poland	Zbigniew Spruch	
1992	Poland	Dariusz Baranowski	
1993	Poland	Andrzej Sypytkowski	
1994	Poland	Krzysztof Biskup	
1995	Poland	Paweł Czopek	
1996	Poland	Dariusz Baranowski	
1997	Poland	Mariusz Bielewski	
1998	Poland	Rafał Kaźmierczak	
1999	Poland	Piotr Zaradny	
2000	Poland	Daniel Okruciński	
2001	Poland	Grzegorz Wajs	
2002	Ukraine	Alexei Nakazny	
2003	Poland	Paweł Bentkowski	
2004	Poland	Krzysztof Rzepecki	
2005	Poland	Mateusz Rybczyński	
2006	Poland	Daniel Czajkowski	
2007	Poland	Daniel Czajkowski	
2008	Poland	Marcin Sapa	
2009	Poland	Kamil Zieliński	
2010	Poland	Piotr Gawroński	
2011	Poland	Mateusz Taciak	
2012	Poland	Mariusz Witecki	
2013	Czech Republic	Vojtěch Hačecký	ASC Dukla Praha
2014	Poland	Błażej Janiaczyk	BDC Marcpol
2015	Poland	Adam Stachowiak	Kolss BDC Team
2016	Czech Republic	Vojtěch Hačecký	Team Dukla Praha
2017	Poland	Alan Banaszek	CCC–Sprandi–Polkowice
2018	Poland	Łukasz Owsian	CCC–Sprandi–Polkowice
2019	Poland	Sylwester Janiszewski	Wibatech Merx 7R
2020	Poland	Bartosz Rudyk	Wibatech Merx 7R
2021	Poland	Bartosz Rudyk	TC Chrobry Scott Głogów
2022	Poland	Tobiasz Pawlak	HRE Mazowsze Serce Polski
