= Vrona =

Vrona may refer to:

- Vrona, Oklahoma, former name of Nicut, Oklahoma
- Ivan Vrona (1887–1970), Ukrainian artist

== See also ==
- Wrona
