= Tomasz Smoleń =

Polish cyclist

Personal information
- Full name: Tomasz Smoleń
- Born: 3 February 1983 (age 43) Dębica, Poland

Cycling career
- Sport: Cycling
- Current team: Retired
- Discipline: Road
- Role: Rider

Amateur team
- 2003–2008: CC Étupes

Professional teams
- 2009–2011: CCC–Polsat–Polkowice
- 2012–2013: Bank BGŻ
- 2014: Wibatech Fuji Zory

Tomasz Smoleń (born 3 February 1983 in Dębica) is a Polish former professional racing cyclist.

== Major results ==
2005
2nd overall Rhône-Alpes Isère Tour

1st stage 4

3rd La Côte Picarde
3rd Paris–Tours Espoirs
2009
1st stage 3 Szlakiem Grodów Piastowskich
1st stage 3 Tour of Małopolska
2nd Road race, National Road Championships
2010
1st stage 6 Tour de Taiwan
1st stage 3 Tour of Małopolska
2011
2nd road race, National Road Championships
2012
1st Memoriał Andrzeja Trochanowskiego
1st stage 5 Okolo Slovenska
1st stage 2 Okolo Jižních Čech
2nd Road race, National Road Championships
