= Korona Kocich Gór =

Polish one-day road cycling race

Race details
- Date: June
- Region: Gmina Zawonia
- Discipline: Road
- Competition: UCI Europe Tour
- Type: One day race
- Web site: www.koronakocichgor.com

History
- First edition: 2013
- Editions: 7 (as of 2019)
- First winner: Błażej Janiaczyk (POL)
- Most wins: No repeat winners
- Most recent: Patryk Stosz (POL)

The Korona Kocich Gór is a one-day cycling race held in Poland. It was first held in 2013 and has been part of the UCI Europe Tour in category 1.2 since 2015.

== Winners ==
Year	Country	Rider	Team
2013	Poland	Błażej Janiaczyk	Bank BGŻ
2014	Poland	Wojciech Halejak	Mexller
2015	Czech Republic	František Sisr	Team Dukla Praha
2016	Poland	Mateusz Komar	Domin Sport
2017	Poland	Łukasz Owsian	CCC–Sprandi–Polkowice
2018	Poland	Michał Podlaski	Voster ATS Team
2019	Poland	Patryk Stosz	CCC Development Team
2020	No race due to the COVID-19 pandemic in Poland		
