= Piotr Zaradny =

Polish cyclist

Personal information
- Born: 16 February 1972 (age 54) Krotoszyn, Poland

Cycling career
- Sport: Cycling
- Current team: Retired
- Discipline: Road
- Role: Rider

Professional teams
- 2000: Mat–Ceresit–CCC
- 2001: Atlas–Lukullus
- 2002: Ambra–Centrum Obuwia
- 2003: Mikomax
- 2004–2006: Knauf Team
- 2007–2008: DHL–Author

Piotr Zaradny (born 16 February 1972) is a former Polish racing cyclist.

== Palmares ==
1997
1st Szlakiem Grodów Piastowskich
1998
1st Stage 3 Peace Race
1999
1st Stages 1 & 2 Bałtyk–Karkonosze Tour
2000
1st Stage 1 Bałtyk–Karkonosze Tour
2001
1st Stages 11 & 12 Tour du Maroc
2002
1st Stage 2 Dookoła Mazowsza
2003
1st Stage 3 Szlakiem Grodów Piastowskich
1st Stages 2 & 3 Dookoła Mazowsza
2nd Szlakiem Walk Majora Hubala
2004
1st Stages 2 & 8 Tour du Maroc
1st Prologue and Stage 1 Szlakiem Grodów Piastowskich
2nd Dookoła Mazowsza

1st Prologue & Stages 1 & 4

2005
1st Stage 1 Bałtyk–Karkonosze Tour
1st Stage 3 Dookoła Mazowsza
1st Dookoła Mazowsza
1st Stage 3
2006
1st Stage 3 Bałtyk–Karkonosze Tour
1st Stage 2 Dookoła Mazowsza
2007
1st Prologue Szlakiem Walk Majora Hubala
1st Stage 1b Tour of Croatia
1st Stages 2 & 5 Bałtyk–Karkonosze Tour
1st, Stages 1, 3 & 6 Course de la Solidarité Olympique
2nd Dookoła Mazowsza

1st Stages 2a, 3 & 5

2nd Memoriał Andrzeja Trochanowskiego
2008
1st Stage 2 Bałtyk–Karkonosze Tour
1st Stage 2 Course de la Solidarité Olympique
1st Stage 2 Dookoła Mazowsza
