= Piotr Przydział =

Polish cyclist

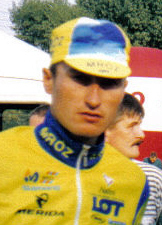

Personal information
- Born: 15 May 1974 (age 52) Sędziszów Małopolski, Poland
- Height: 1.86 m (6 ft 1 in)
- Weight: 80 kg (176 lb)

Cycling career
- Sport: Cycling
- Discipline: Road
- Role: Rider

Professional teams
- 1996: Pecaes–Bolato
- 2000–2004: Mat–Ceresit–CCC
- 2005: DHL–Author
- 2007: Dynatek
- 2007: Passage

Piotr Przydział (born 15 May 1974) is a Polish former racing cyclist. He won the Tour de Pologne 2000. He also rode in the men's road race at the 2000 Summer Olympics.

== Major results ==
1994
1st Overall Tour of Małopolska
1998
1st National Time Trial Championships
1999
1st Stage 8 Volta a Portugal
1st Stage 8 Peace Race
2nd National Road Race Championships
2000
1st Overall Tour de Pologne
2nd Overall Szlakiem Grodów Piastowskich
2nd Overall Peace Race
2001
1st National Time Trial Championships
1st Majowy Wyścig Klasyczny–Lublin
1st Overall Bałtyk–Karkonosze Tour
3rd Overall Course de la Solidarité Olympique
3rd Overall Tour of Małopolska

1st Stages 2 & 4

3rd Overall Tour de Pologne
2002
1st Stages 4 & 10 Peace Race
2003
1st National Road Race Championships
2004
1st Overall Szlakiem Grodów Piastowskich

1st Stage 4

1st Majowy Wyścig Klasyczny–Lublin
2005
1st Grand Prix Kooperativa
3rd Overall Szlakiem Grodów Piastowskich
