= Edward Barcik =

Polish cyclist

Personal information
- Born: 31 January 1950 (age 76) Prusice, Poland
- Height: 1.78 m (5 ft 10 in)
- Weight: 72 kg (159 lb)

Sport
- Sport: Cycling
- Club: LZS Opol
Medal record
Representing Poland
Olympic Games
Silver medal – second place	1972 Munich	Team time trial
World championships
Bronze medal – third place	1971 Mendrisio	Team time trial

Edward Barcik (born 31 May 1950) is a retired Polish cyclist. He had his best achievements in the 100 km team time trial, namely a silver medal at the 1972 Summer Olympics and a bronze medal at the 1971 UCI Road World Championships. Individually he won the Tour of Małopolska in 1972 and Szlakiem Grodów Piastowskich in 1975. He was awarded the Polish Cross of Merit.

After retiring from competitions he worked as a cycling coach and organizer of youth competitions. In December 1981, he moved to Hanau, Germany. He is married and has two daughters.
