= Bank BGŻ team =

Bank BGŻ
Team information
- UCI code: BGZ
- Registered: Poland
- Founded: 2000
- Disbanded: 2013
- Discipline: Road
- Status: 2000–2004: Div. III; 2005–2013: Cont

Key personnel
- Team manager: Zbigniew Szczepkowski

Team name history
- 2000–2001 2002–2003 2004–2010 2011–2013: Servisco; Servisco-Koop; DHL–Author; Bank BGŻ

Bank BGŻ (UCI team code: BGZ), named after the eponymous BGZ Bank, was a continental cycling team based in Poland that participated in UCI Continental Circuits races. From 2004 to 2010 it was known as "DHL–Author"; from 2011, the team has the homonymous Polish bank as its main sponsor. It disbanded at the end of the 2013 season.

== Major wins ==
2000
Stage 2 Dookoła Mazowsza, Zbigniew Wyrzykowski
Stage 3 Dookoła Mazowsza, Marek Kaminski
2001
Stage 2 Dookoła Mazowsza, Marek Kaminski
Stage 4 Dookoła Mazowsza, Paweł Szaniawski
2002
Memorial Andrzeja Kaczyny, Bartłomiej Ksobiak
2003
Stage 3 Bałtyk–Karkonosze Tour, Grzegorz Rosolinski
Stage 6b Bałtyk–Karkonosze Tour, Robert Radosz
2004
Memoriał Andrzeja Trochanowskiego, Mariusz Witecki
Stages 2 & 4 Bałtyk–Karkonosze Tour, Marcin Gebka
Stage 6 Course de la Solidarité Olympique, Marcin Gebka
2005
GP Kooperativa, Piotr Przydział
Overall Bałtyk–Karkonosze Tour, Radosław Romanik

Stage 4, Marcin Gebka
Stage 5, Radosław Romanik

GP Judendorf-Strassengel, Krzysztof Ciesielski
Stage 7 Course de la Solidarité Olympique, Dariusz Skoczylas
Stage 2 Tour of Małopolska, Radosław Romanik
Coupe des Carpathes, Radosław Romanik
2006
Overall Course de la Solidarité Olympique, Robert Radosz

Stage 1, Robert Radosz

Puchar Ministra Obrony Narodowej, Marcin Gebka
Overall Tour de Slovaquie, Radosław Romanik

Stage 4, Radosław Romanik

Stage 4a Tour of Bulgaria, Robert Radosz
2007
GP Hydraulika Mikolasek, Marcin Sapa
Overall Bałtyk–Karkonosze Tour, Roman Broniš

Stages 2 & 5, Piotr Zaradny
Stage 6, Radosław Romanik
Stage 7, Marcin Sapa

Stages 1, 3 & 6 Course de la Solidarité Olympique, Piotr Zaradny
Pomorski Klasyk, Marcin Sapa
Stages 1, 2, 4 & 6 Dookoła Mazowsza, Piotr Zaradny
Overall Tour of Małopolska, Mateusz Komar

Stage 1, Mateusz Komar

Prologue Szlakiem Walk Majora Hubala, Piotr Zaradny
Stage 1 Szlakiem Walk Majora Hubala, Mateusz Komar
Stage 3 Szlakiem Walk Majora Hubala, Daniel Czajkowski
Stage 1 Tour de Slovaquie, Marci Sapa
Stage 5 Tour de Slovaquie, Kazimierz Stafiej
Stages 1a & 5 Tour de Croatie, Marcin Sapa
Stage 1b Tour de Croatie, Piotr Zaradny
2008
Overall Bałtyk–Karkonosze Tour, Radosław Romanik

Stage 2, Piotr Zaradny

Poland Road Race Championships, Marcin Sapa
Poland Time Trial Championships, Łukasz Bodnar
Overall Course de la Solidarité Olympique, Łukasz Bodnar

Stage 2, Piotr Zaradny
Stage 4, Łukasz Bodnar

Pomorski Klasyk, Dariusz Baranowski
Overall Dookoła Mazowsza, Marcin Sapa

Stage 2, Piotr Zaradny
Stage 5, Team Time Trial

Overall Tour of Małopolska, Marcin Sapa

Stage 1, Marcin Sapa

2009
Stage 4 Bałtyk–Karkonosze Tour, Mateusz Komar
Overall Tour of Małopolska, Artur Detko

Stage 1, Artur Detko

2010
2011
Stage 4 Tour de Slovaquie, Paweł Cieślik
2012
Memoriał Andrzeja Trochanowskiego, Tomasz Smoleń
Stage 2 Tour of Małopolska, Paweł Cieślik
Stage 5 Tour de Slovaquie, Tomasz Smoleń
Overall Course de la Solidarité Olympique, Mariusz Witecki
Stage 2 Okolo Jižních Čech, Tomasz Smoleń
2013
Overall Tour of Małopolska, Łukasz Bodnar

Stage 2, Łukasz Bodnar

== 2013 squad ==
As of 22 January 2013.

Rider	Date of birth
Dariusz Batek (POL)	27 April 1986 (age 40)
Łukasz Bodnar (POL)	10 May 1982 (age 44)
Paweł Bryłowski (POL)	29 June 1989 (age 37)
Mieszko Bulik (POL)	19 July 1990 (age 36)
Paweł Cieślik (POL)	3 February 1989 (age 37)
Konrad Czajkowski (POL)	11 January 1980 (age 46)
Błażej Janiaczyk (POL)	27 January 1983 (age 43)

Rider	Date of birth
Patryk Komisarek (POL)	3 March 1993 (age 33)
Mateusz Nowaczek (POL)	13 March 1991 (age 35)
Michał Podlaski (POL)	13 May 1988 (age 38)
Tomasz Smoleń (POL)	3 February 1983 (age 43)
Adam Stachowiak (POL)	10 July 1989 (age 37)
Adrian Tekliński (POL)	3 November 1989 (age 36)
Mariusz Witecki (POL)	10 May 1981 (age 45)
