= Paweł Niedźwiecki =

Polish cyclist

Personal information
- Full name: Paweł Niedźwiecki
- Born: 12 May 1974 (age 52)

Cycling career
- Sport: Cycling
- Role: Rider
- Rider type: Road

Professional teams
- 1996: Pecaes-Bolato-Langrover
- 2000–2002: Mróz–Supradyn Witaminy

Paweł Niedźwiecki (born 12 May 1974) is a Polish former road racing cyclist.

== Palmarès ==
Date	Placing	Event	Competition	Location	Country
1994	1	General Classification	Szlakiem Grodów Piastowskich		Poland
1995	1		Memoriał Andrzeja Trochanowskiego		Poland
1997	2	Time trial	National championships		Poland
2000	1	Stage 5	Commonwealth Bank Classic		Australia
2001	1	Stage 1	Tour of Japan	Sakai	Japan
2001	1	General Classification	Tour of Japan		Japan
2001	3	Road race	National championships		Poland
