= Jacek Bodyk =

Polish cyclist

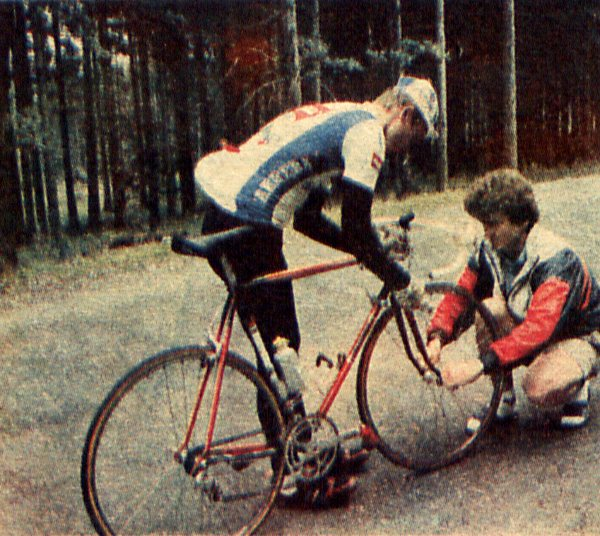
- Bodyk (left) in 1991

Personal information
- Born: 12 June 1966 (age 60) Polkowice, Poland

Cycling career
- Sport: Cycling
- Current team: Retired
- Discipline: Road
- Role: Rider

Professional team
- 1992: Lampre–Colnago

Jacek Bodyk (born 12 June 1966) is a Polish former cyclist. He competed in the road race at the 1988 Summer Olympics.

== Palmares ==
1987
1st Stage 9 Tour de Pologne
1988
1st Stage 4 Tour de Pologne
1989
1st Stages 1 & 2 Tour de Pologne
1st Stage 9 Niedersachsen-Rundfahrt
1990
1st Stage 8 Peace Race
1st stage 6b Circuit de Lorraine
1991
1st Tour of Małopolska
1994
1st Grand Prix Cristal Energie
1994
3rd Course de la Solidarité Olympique
