= Tadeusz Wrona =

Tadeusz Wrona may refer to:

- Tadeusz Wrona (aviator) (born 1958), Polish civil pilot
- Tadeusz Wrona (politician) (born 1951), Polish politician, MP, mayor of Częstochowa
