= Zenon Czechowski =

Polish cyclist

Personal information
- Born: 19 November 1946 Poznań, Poland
- Died: 17 November 2016 (aged 69)

Cycling career
- Sport: Cycling

Zenon Czechowski (19 November 1946 – 17 November 2016) was a Polish cyclist. He competed in the individual road race and the team time trial events at the 1968 Summer Olympics.
