= Aitor Galdós =

Spanish cyclist

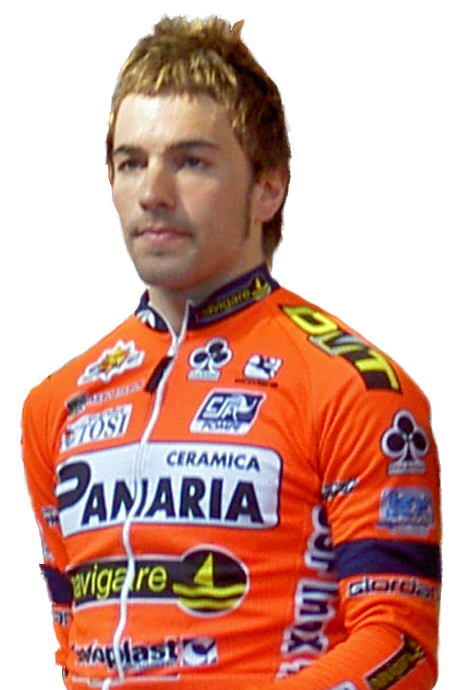

Personal information
- Full name: Aitor Galdós Alonso
- Born: November 9, 1979 (age 46) Ermua, Spain

Cycling career
- Sport: Cycling
- Current team: Retired
- Discipline: Road
- Role: Rider
- Rider type: Sprinter

Professional teams
- 2005–2006: Ceramica Panaria–Navigare
- 2007–2010: Euskaltel–Euskadi
- 2011–2012: Caja Rural

Aitor Galdós Alonso (born November 9, 1979) is a Spanish professional road bicycle racer who last rode for UCI Professional Continental team Caja Rural.

== Major results ==
1997
Spain U19 Cyclo-Cross Champion (1997)
2004
1st, Overall Giro del Lago Maggiore
1 stage in Tour of Maroc
1 stage in Circuito Montañés
2006
1 stage in Tour of Denmark
1 stage in Tour de Wallonie
2009
7th, Milan-San Remo
2012
1st Sprints classification Vuelta a Burgos
