= Zdzisław Wrona =

Polish cyclist (born 1962)

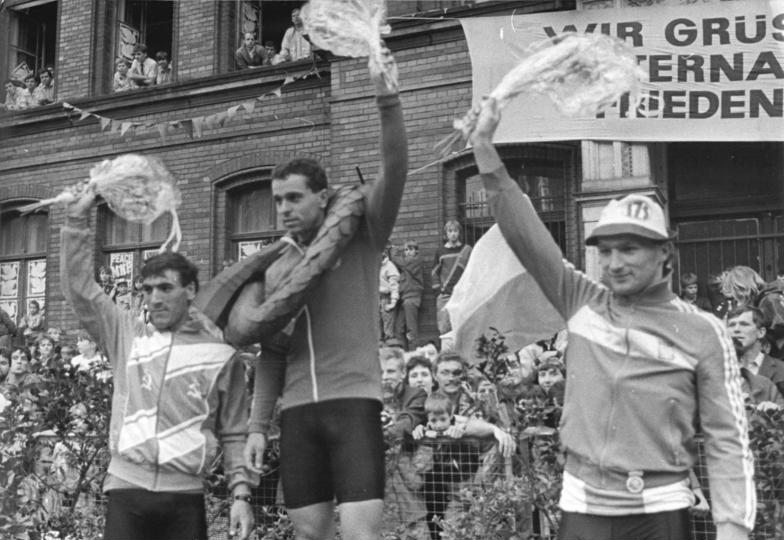
- Wrona (right) at the Peace Race 1987

Personal information
- Born: 12 January 1962 (age 64) Sobótka, Poland

Cycling career
- Sport: Cycling

Zdzisław Wrona (born 12 January 1962) is a Polish former cyclist. He competed in the road race at the 1988 Summer Olympics.
