= Domin Sport =

Polish cycling team

Team information
- UCI code: DOM
- Registered: Poland
- Founded: 2013
- Discipline: Road
- Status: UCI Continental

Team name history
- 2013 2014 2015–2018: Las Vegas Power Energy Drink; Mexller; Domin Sport

Domin Sport was a Polish cycling team founded in 2012.

The team was UCI Continental from 2013 through 2017, and downgraded to the status of club for the 2018 season.

== Team roster ==
Rider	Date of birth
Paweł Bernas (POL)	24 May 1990 (age 36)
Paweł Charucki (POL)	14 October 1988 (age 37)
Artur Detko (POL)	18 February 1983 (age 43)
Kacper Gronkiewicz (POL)	29 June 1993 (age 33)
Patryk Kostecki (POL)	17 August 1993 (age 33)
Adrian Kucharek (POL)	19 July 1994 (age 32)

Rider	Date of birth
Jarosław Marycz (POL)	17 April 1987 (age 39)
Jarosław Rębiewski (POL)	27 February 1974 (age 52)
Piotr Skrzeszewski (POL)	20 April 1994 (age 32)
Piotr Wojciechowski (POL)	9 June 1992 (age 34)
Kamil Zieliński (POL)	3 March 1988 (age 38)

== Major wins ==
2014
Overall Course de la Solidarité Olympique, Kamil Zieliński

Stage 4, Kamil Zieliński

2015
Memoriał Andrzeja Trochanowskiego, Mateusz Nowak
Stage 6 Bałtyk–Karkonosze Tour, Kamil Zieliński
Stage 1 Podlasie Tour, Kamil Zieliński
2017
Kerékpárverseny, Kamil Zieliński
Stage 2 (ITT) Szlakiem Walk Majora Hubala, Kamil Zieliński
Stage 1 Tour of Małopolska, Kamil Zieliński
Stage 5 Course de Solidarność et des Champions Olympiques, Kamil Zieliński
Stage 2 Dookoła Mazowsza, Jarosław Marycz
