= Dariusz Baranowski =

Polish cyclist

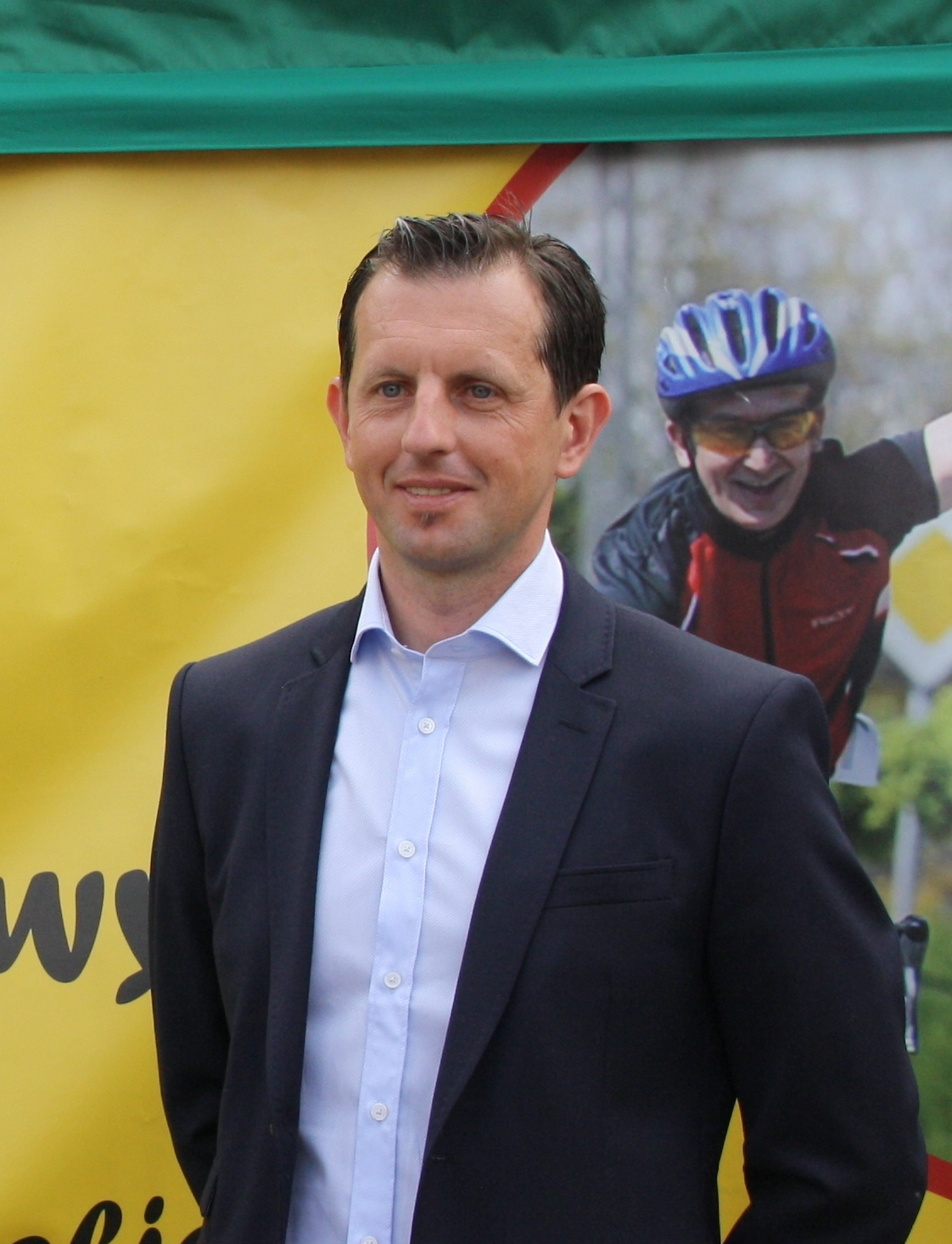

Personal information
- Full name: Dariusz Baranowski
- Nickname: Ryba (Fish in Polish)
- Born: 22 June 1972 (age 54) Wałbrzych, Poland
- Height: 1.77 m (5 ft 9 1/2 in)
- Weight: 70 kg (154 lb; 11 st 0 lb)

Cycling career
- Sport: Cycling
- Discipline: Road
- Role: Rider

Amateur teams
- 2011: Polska Szosowa
- 2011: BDC Team

Professional teams
- 1996–1998: U.S. Postal Service
- 1999–2002: Banesto
- 2003: CCC–Polsat
- 2004–2006: Liberty Seguros
- 2008–2009: DHL-Author
- 2010: Romet Weltour Debiça
- 2011–2012: BDC-Marcpol

Dariusz Baranowski (born 22 June 1972) is a Polish former professional racing cyclist. He is known as individual time trialist and a climbing specialist who excels in competing in the King of the Mountains competitions for stage races. He has competed in all three of the Grand Tours. He also won the Tour de Pologne 1991, 1992 and 1993. He also rode at the 1992 Summer Olympics and the 1996 Summer Olympics.

== Major results ==
1991
1st, Overall, Tour de Pologne
1992
1st, Overall, Tour de Pologne
1993
1st, Overall, Tour de Pologne
1996
3rd, Rheinland-Pfalz Rundfahrt
1997
87th, Overall, Tour de France
1998
12th, Overall, Tour de France
3rd, Grand Prix Eddy Merckx
1999
3rd, Stage 9, Volta a Portugal
2000
30th, Overall, Tour de France
2001
5th, Stage 13, Vuelta a España
2002
24th, Overall, Tour de France
1st, King of the Mountains, Dauphiné Libéré
1st Overall Grande Prémio Internacional de Ciclismo MR Cortez-Mitsubishi

1st Stages 3 (ITT) & 4

2003
12th, Overall, Giro d'Italia
2004
94th, Overall, Tour de France
14th, Volta a Catalunya
2005
19th, Paris-Nice
2008
1st, Pomorski Klasyk
