= Israel Cycling Federation =

National governing body of cycle racing in Israel

The Israel Cycling Federation or ICF (in Hebrew: איגוד האופניים בישראל) is the national governing body of cycle racing in Israel.

The ICF is a member of the UCI and the UEC.

== See also ==
- Cycling in Israel
