= Roman Cieślak =

Roman Sławomir Cieślak is a Polish psychologist who is the Rector of SWPS University of Social Sciences and Humanities.

Cieślak earned his undergraduate degree in psychology from the Warsaw University. Subsequently, he obtained his doctoral degree from the Institute of Psychology of the Polish Academy of Sciences (2000), an extended Ph.D. (habilitacja) form the Warsaw School of Social Psychology (2010), and in 2018, he was awarded a title of Professor by the President of the Republic of Poland.

Cieślak completed his postdoctoral work at the University of Colorado in Colorado Springs, where he worked as Director for Research and Senior Statistical and Content Expert Consultant of the Trauma, Health & Hazards Center (THHC), collaborating with Dr. Chip Benight.

== Awards ==
In 2011, Cieślak was awarded the Officer's Cross of the Order of Polonia Restituta.
