= Grand Prix Kooperativa =

Race details
- Date: May
- Region: Slovakia
- Discipline: Road
- Competition: UCI Europe Tour
- Type: One day race

History
- First edition: 2004
- Editions: 6
- Final edition: 2009
- First winner: Laszlo Garamszegi (HUN)
- Most wins: No repeat winners
- Final winner: Peter Sagan (SVK)

The Grand Prix Kooperativa was a cycling race held annually in Slovakia. It was part of UCI Europe Tour in category 1.2.

== Winners ==
Year	Winner	Second	Third
2004	(Hungary) Laszlo Garamszegi	(Slovakia) Martin Prázdnovský	(Czech Republic) Stanislav Kozubek
2005	(Poland) Piotr Przydział	(Czech Republic) František Raboň	(Kazakhstan) Kairat Baigudinov
2006	(Slovakia) Peter Velits	(Slovenia) Jure Kocjan	(Croatia) Radoslav Rogina
2007	(Slovenia) Kristjan Fajt	(Czech Republic) René Andrle	(Poland) Marcin Sapa
2008	(Serbia) Esad Hasanovic	(Serbia) Nebojša Jovanović	(Poland) Artur Detko
2009	(Slovakia) Peter Sagan	(Ukraine) Oleksandr Sheydyk	(Austria) Rupert Probst
