= Marek Wrona =

Polish cyclist

Personal information
- Born: 31 August 1966 (age 60) Oława, Poland

Cycling career
- Sport: Cycling
- Role: Rider

Marek Wrona (born 31 August 1966) is a Polish former racing cyclist. He won the Tour de Pologne 1989.

== PCS Ranking position per season ==
	POINTS	POSITION
1998	2	1293
1995	18	662
1993	5	849
1989	34	577
