= Andrzej Sypytkowski =

Polish cyclist

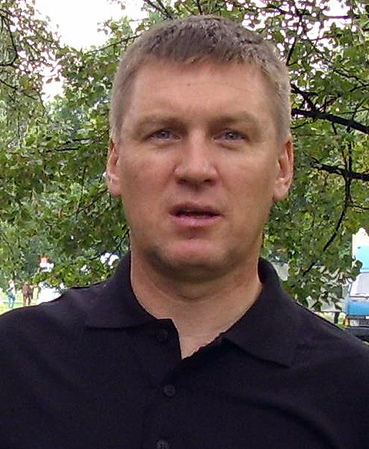
- Sypytkowski in 2007

Personal information
- Full name: Andrzej Sypytkowski
- Born: 14 October 1963 (age 63) Korsze, Poland

Cycling career
- Sport: Cycling
- Discipline: Road
- Role: Rider

Professional teams
- 1994: Kelme–Avianca–Gios
- 1995: Rotan Spiessens–Hot Dog Louis
- 1996–1999: Mróz

Andrzej Sypytkowski (born 14 October 1963) is a Polish former racing cyclist. He won the silver medal in the team time trial at the 1988 Summer Olympics and finished 6th in the road race at the 1992 Summer Olympics.

== Major results ==
1986
1st Stage 4 Tour de Pologne
10th Overall GP Tell
1987
1st Overall Tour of Małopolska
1988
2nd Team time trial, Summer Olympics (with Joachim Halupczok, Zenon Jaskuła and Marek Leśniewski)
1992
2nd GP Lugano
6th Road race, Olympic Games
1993
1st Tour du Lac Léman
4th Overall Tour de Pologne
1995
1st Road race, National Road Championships
4th Druivenkoers Overijse
1996
2nd Grote Prijs Jef Scherens
1997
6th Overall Course Cycliste de Solidarnosc et des Champions Olympiques
1998
3rd Time trial, National Road Championships
6th Overall Tour de Slovénie
6th Overall Course Cycliste de Solidarnosc et des Champions Olympiques
8th Overall Tour of Japan
1999
1st Overall Tour of Japan

1st Stage 2

5th Overall Course Cycliste de Solidarnosc et des Champions Olympiques
