= Marcin Sapa =

Polish cyclist (born 1976)

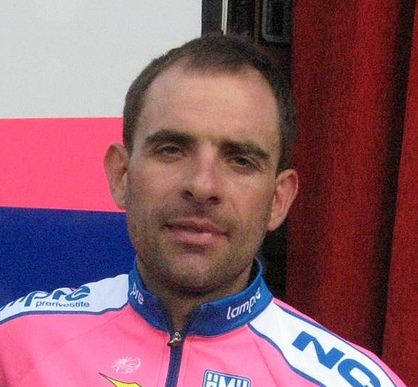

Personal information
- Full name: Marcin Sapa
- Born: 10 February 1976 (age 50) Konin, Poland
- Height: 1.79 m (5 ft 10 in)
- Weight: 82 kg (181 lb)

Cycling career
- Sport: Cycling
- Discipline: Road
- Role: Rider

Amateur team
- 1999: Huta Aluminium

Professional teams
- 2000–2002: Atlas-Lukullus-Ambra
- 2003–2006: Mikomax-Browar Staropolski
- 2007–2008: DHL-Author
- 2009–2010: Lampre–NGC
- 2011–2013: BDC-Marcpol

Marcin Sapa (born 10 February 1976 in Konin) is a Polish road bicycle racer, who most recently rode for BDC-Marcpol team. He turned professional in 2000 and raced with smaller teams including DHL-Author before joining Lampre–NGC for the 2009 and 2010 seasons.

== Major results ==
2007
1st Pomorski Klasyk
2008
1st Dookoła Mazowsza
1st Tour of Małopolska
2010
1st Stage 5 Bayern-Rundfahrt
2011
1st Overall Course de la Solidarité Olympique

1st Stage 3

2012
2nd Overall Tour of Bulgaria
2013
1st Overall Dookoła Mazowsza

1st Stage 4 (TTT)

1st Stage 4 Tour of Bulgaria
1st Combativity classification, Tour of Małopolska
5th Puchar Ministra Obrony Narodowej
