= Pomerania Tour =

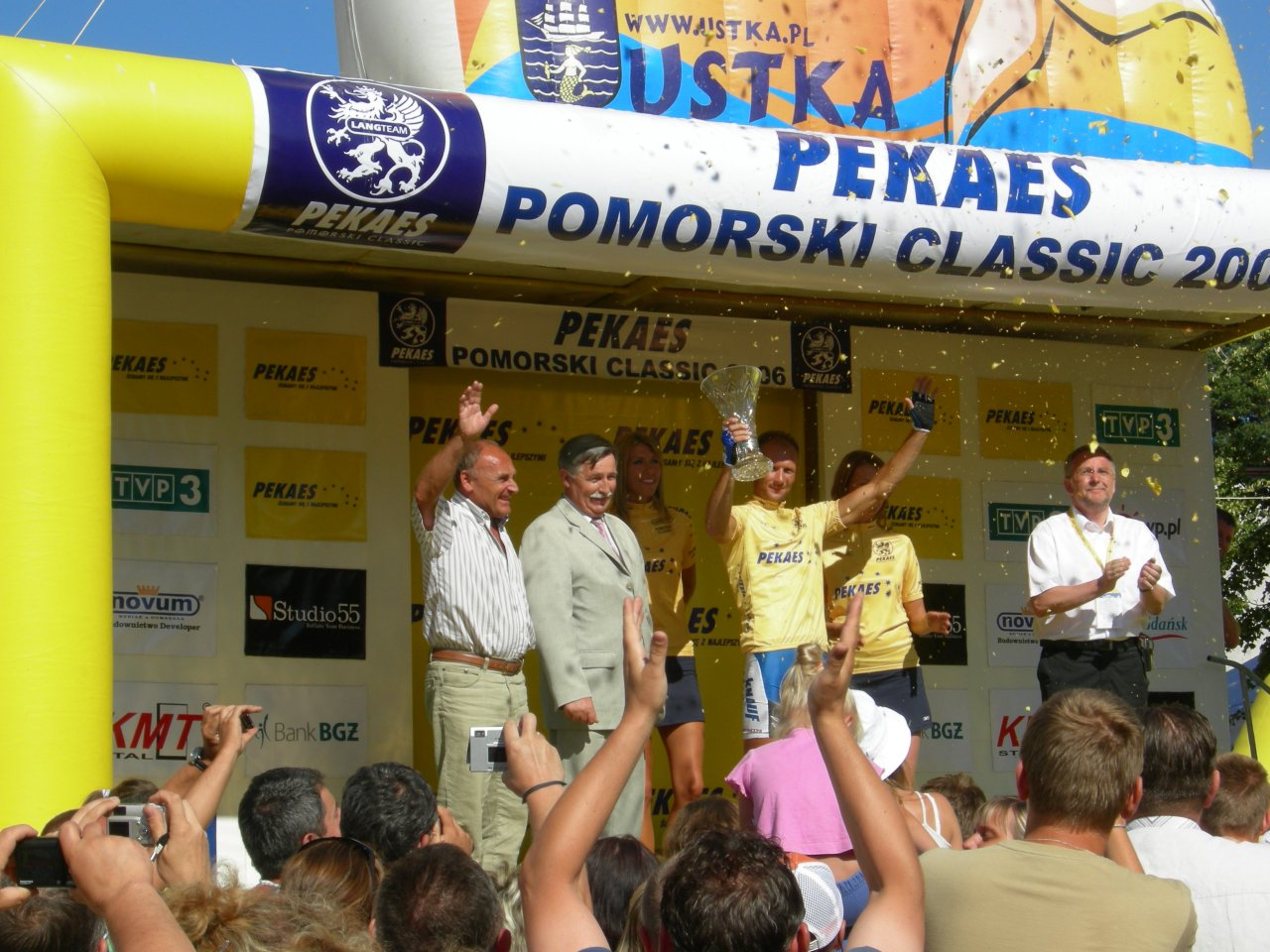
- The winner of Pomerania Tour in 2006

Race details
- Region: Pomeranian Voivodeship, Poland
- Discipline: Road
- Competition: UCI Europe Tour
- Type: Single-day race

History
- First edition: 2003
- Editions: 8 (as of 2010)
- First winner: Zbigniew Piątek (POL)
- Most recent: Dirk Müller (GER)

The Pomerania Tour (2003-2008: Pomorski Klasyk) is a cycling race held annually in the Pomeranian Voivodeship, Poland. It was first held in 2003 as the Pomorski Klasyk and since 2005 has been part of the UCI Europe Tour. In 2009, the name was changed to Pomerania Tour and the event was extended to a stage race. In 2010, it was held as a single-day race again.

== Past winners ==
Year	Country	Rider	Team
2003	Poland	Zbigniew Piątek	
2004	Poland	Piotr Chmielewski	
2005	Poland	Piotr Wadecki	
2006	Poland	Krzysztof Jeżowski	
2007	Poland	Marcin Sapa	
2008	Poland	Dariusz Baranowski	
2009	Poland	Artur Detko	
2010	Germany	Dirk Müller	
