= Memoriał Andrzeja Trochanowskiego =

Polish one-day road cycling race

Race details
- Date: 1 May
- Region: Masovian Voivodeship, Poland
- English name: Memorial of Andrzej Trochanowski
- Discipline: Road
- Competition: UCI Europe Tour
- Type: One-day race

History
- First edition: 1989
- Editions: 36 (as of 2026)
- First winner: Stanisław Trzeciak (POL)
- Most wins: 4 wins: Alois Kaňkovský (CZE)
- Most recent: Lars Rouffaer (NED)

The Memoriał Andrzeja Trochanowskiego (Andrzej Trochanowski Memorial) is a one-day cycling race held annually on 1 May in the Masovian Voivodeship, Poland. It was first held in 1989 and since 2005 has been part of the UCI Europe Tour as a 1.2 race beginning in Płońsk. The race is named after Andrzej Trochanowski, coach of Legia Warsaw and of the Polish national team.

In 2020 and 2021, it did not take place due to the COVID-19 pandemic.

== Past winners ==
Year	Country	Rider	Team
1989	Poland	Stanisław Trzeciak	
1990	Poland	Robert Grzechnik	
1991	Poland	Grzegorz Gronkiewicz	
1992	Poland	Piotr Chmielewski	
1993	Ukraine	Anatolij Czubar	
1994	Ukraine	Igor Cuczlanczew	
1995	Poland	Paweł Niedźwiecki	
1996	Lithuania	Raimondas Rumsas	
1997	Poland	Grzegorz Wajs	
1998	Poland	Marek Wrona	
1999	Poland	Aleksij Nakazany	
2000	Poland	Piotr Chmielewski	Mróz–Supradyn Witaminy
2001	Poland	Adam Wadecki	Mróz–Supradyn Witaminy
2002	Ukraine	Bogdan Bondariew	Mróz
2003	Poland	Paweł Szaniawski	Legia–Bazyliszek
2004	Poland	Mariusz Witecki	DHL–Author
2005	Czech Republic	František Raboň	PSK Whirlpool
2006	Poland	Piotr Chmielewski	CCC–Polsat
2007	Poland	Tomasz Lisowicz	CCC–Polsat–Polkowice
2008	Poland	Tomasz Kiendyś	CCC Polsat–Polkowice
2009	Poland	Mateusz Taciak	Mróz Continental Team
2010	Germany	André Schulze	PSK Whirlpool–Author
2011	Germany	André Schulze	CCC–Polsat–Polkowice
2012	Poland	Tomasz Smoleń	Bank BGŻ
2013	Poland	Konrad Dąbkowski	BDC–Marcpol Team
2014	Poland	Kamil Gradek	BDC Marcpol
2015	Poland	Mateusz Nowak	Domin Sport
2016	Czech Republic	Alois Kaňkovský	Whirlpool–Author
2017	Czech Republic	Alois Kaňkovský	Elkov–Author
2018	Czech Republic	Alois Kaňkovský	Elkov–Author
2019	Czech Republic	Alois Kaňkovský	Elkov–Author
2020	No race due to Covid-19 pandemic		
2021	No race due to Covid-19 pandemic		
2022	Germany	Tobias Nolde	P&S Benotti
2023	Israel	Itamar Einhorn	Israel (National team)
2024	Poland	Norbert Banaszek	Mazowsze Serce Polski
2025	Poland	Marceli Bogusławski	ATT Investments
2026	Netherlands	Lars Rouffaer	EEW–VDK Cyclingteam
