= Szlakiem Grodów Piastowskich =

Polish multi-day road cycling race

Race details
- Date: Early May
- Region: Lower Silesian Voivodeship, Poland
- Local name: Szlakiem Grodów Piastowskich (in Polish)
- Discipline: Road
- Competition: UCI Europe Tour
- Type: Stage race
- Organiser: Stowarzyszenie Grody Piastowskie
- Web site: www.grody.com.pl

History
- First edition: 1966
- Editions: 55 (as of 2021)
- First winner: Henryk Kowalski (POL)
- Most wins: Zdzislaw Wrona (POL); Marek Rutkiewicz (POL) (3 wins)
- Most recent: Maciej Paterski (POL)

The Szlakiem Grodów Piastowskich, officially known as the CCC Tour – Grody Piastowskie, is a road bicycle racing stage race held annually in Lower Silesian Voivodeship, Poland. It was first held in 1966 and since 2005, it has been organised as a 2.1 event on the UCI Europe Tour.

== Winners ==
Year	Country	Rider	Team
1966	Poland	Henryk Kowalski	
1967	Poland	Rajmund Zieliński	
1968	Poland	Ryszard Gac	
1969	Soviet Union	Jurij Dmitriew	
1970	Soviet Union	Ringold Kalnienieks	
1971	Poland	Stanisław Gazda	
1972	Poland	Mieczysław Szurko	
1973	Poland	Tadeusz Prasek	
1974	Poland	Wieslaw Kornacki	
1975	Poland	Edward Barcik	
1976	Poland	Stanisław Mikołajczuk	
1977	Poland	Stanisław Szozda	
1978	Poland	Ryszard Szurkowski	
1979	Poland	Sławomir Podwojniak	
1980	Poland	Stanisław Nieumierzycki	
1981	Poland	Ryszard Szurkowski	
1982	Poland	Jerzy Jagiela	
1983	Poland	Tadeusz Mytnik	
1984	Poland	Zdzisław Wrona	
1985	Poland	Mieczysław Karłowicz	
1986	Poland	Zdzisław Wrona	
1987	Poland	Zdzisław Wrona	
1988	Poland	Jacek Bodyk	
1989	Poland	Zbigniew Rudyk	
1990	Poland	Marek Wrona	
1991	Poland	Czesław Rajch	
1991	Poland	Józef Moczydlowski	
1992	Poland	Artur Krzeszowiec	
1993	Poland	Czesław Rajch	
1994	Poland	Paweł Niedźwiecki	
1995	Poland	Grzegorz Piwowarski	
1996	Poland	Sławomir Chrzanowski	
1997	Poland	Piotr Zaradny	
1998	Poland	Andrzej Sypytkowski	Mróz
1999	Poland	Piotr Wadecki	Mróz
2000	Poland	Piotr Wadecki	Mróz–Supradyn Witaminy
2001	Kyrgyzstan	Eugen Wacker	Mróz–Supradyn Witaminy
2002	Poland	Krzysztof Szafrański	CCC–Polsat
2003	Poland	Artur Krasinski	Mikomax–Browar Staropolski
2004	Poland	Piotr Przydział	Hoop–CCC–Polsat
2005	Poland	Zbigniew Piątek	Action-ATI
2006	Poland	Tomasz Kiendyś	Knauf Team
2007	Poland	Tomasz Kiendyś	CCC–Polsat–Polkowice
2008	Poland	Bartosz Huzarski	Poland (national team)
2009	Poland	Mariusz Witecki	Mróz Continental Team
2010	Poland	Marek Rutkiewicz	Mróz–Active Jet
2011	Slovenia	Robert Vrečer	Perutnina Ptuj
2012	Poland	Marek Rutkiewicz	CCC–Polkowice
2013	Czech Republic	Jan Bárta	NetApp–Endura
2014	Poland	Mateusz Taciak	CCC–Polsat–Polkowice
2015	Poland	Paweł Bernas	ActiveJet
2016	Ukraine	Oleksandr Polivoda	Kolss BDC Team
2017	Poland	Marek Rutkiewicz	Wibatech 7R Fuji
2018	Poland	Łukasz Owsian	CCC–Sprandi–Polkowice
2019	Poland	Kamil Małecki	CCC Development Team
2020	No race		
2021	Poland	Maciej Paterski	Voster ATS Team
