= Tour of Małopolska =

Polish multi-day road cycling race

Tour of Malopolska
Race details
- Date: Varies
- Region: Lesser Poland Voivodeship, Poland
- English name: Tour of Lesser Poland
- Local name: Małopolski Wyścig Górski
- Discipline: Road
- Competition: UCI Europe Tour
- Type: Stage race
- Organiser: Gazeta Krakowska
- Web site: tourofmalopolska.eu

History
- First edition: 1961
- Editions: 64 (as of 2026)
- First winner: Roman Chtiej (POL)
- Most wins: Zbigniew Piątek (POL) (3 wins)
- Most recent: Colin Stüssi (SUI)

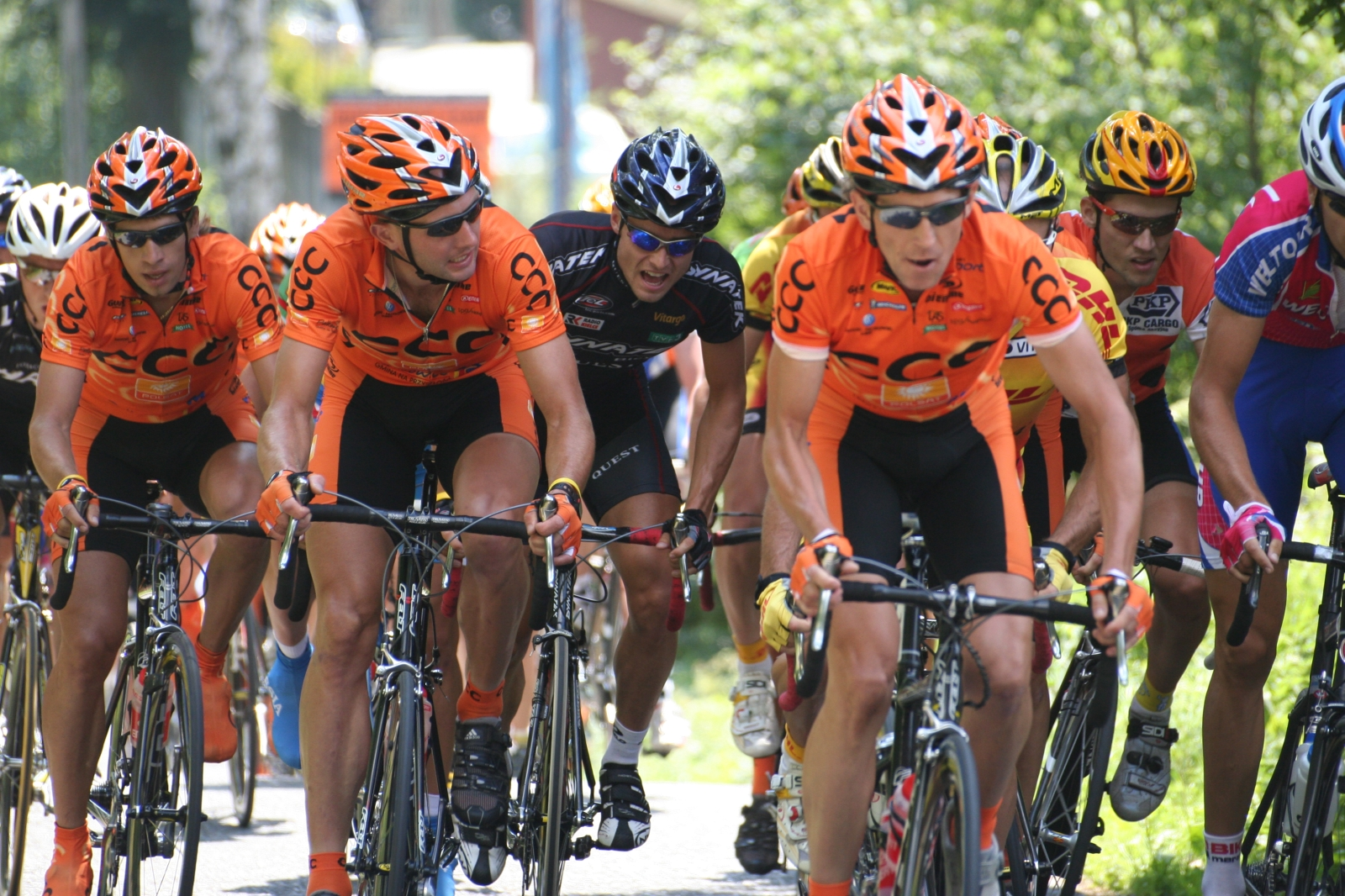
Tour of Małopolska in 2007

Tour of Malopolska (Polish: Małopolski Wyścig Górski) is an annual, professional men's multiple-stage cycling race in Lesser Poland Voivodeship. Since 2005, it has been part of the UCI Europe Tour.

== History ==
The race was first held in 1961 and is one of the oldest bicycle races in Poland. Zbigniew Piątek holds the record for the most victories with three, in 1989, 1998 and 2001. The race usually consists of three or four stages as well as a prologue. The prologue is usually organized at the Main Market Square in Kraków and the points won are included in the general classification. Most of the race consists of hilly or mountain stages. Since 2015, the first stage of Tour of Małopolska has been taking place on the Alwernia – Trzebinia route.

The most recent winner is Márton Dina of Hungary.

== Past winners ==
Year	Country	Rider	Team
1961	Poland	Roman Chtiej	Opole
1962	Poland	Antoni Pałka	Kraków I
1963	Poland	Franciszek Surmiński	OZKol. Opole
1964	Poland	Józef Dylik	LZS Łowicz
1965	Poland	Marian Forma	SHL Kielce
1966	Poland	Czesław Polewiak	LZS Szczecin
1967	Poland	Henryk Woźniak	Legia Warsaw
1968	Poland	Marian Forma	SHL Kielce
1969	Poland	Bogdan Langiewicz	Dolnoślązak Jelenia Góra
1970	Poland	Jan Backowski	SHL Kielce
1971	Poland	Zbigniew Krzeszowiec	Piast Gliwice
1972	Poland	Edward Barcik	Kadra Olimpijska
1973	Poland	Jerzy Rzepka	Unia Oświęcim
1974	Poland	Ryszard Szurkowski	Dolmel Wrocław
1975	Poland	Janusz Kowalski	LZS Wielkopolska
1976	Poland	Stanisław Szozda	LZS Ziemia Opolska
1977	Poland	Ryszard Szurkowski	Dolmel Wrocław
1978	Poland	Tadeusz Mytnik	Flota Gdynia
1979	Poland	Krzysztof Sujka	Społem Łódź
1980	Poland	Roman Cieślak	Poland (national team)
1981	Poland	Czesław Lang	Legia Warsaw
1982	Poland	Jan Muzyka	Tęcza Plon Rzeszów
1983	Poland	Roman Cieślak	Start Piotrków Trybunalski
1984	Poland	Tadeusz Krawczyk	Stomil Poznań
1985	Poland	Zbigniew Albin	Start Piotrków Trybunalski
1986	Poland	Paweł Bartkowiak	Unia Leszno
1987	Poland	Andrzej Sypytkowski	GKS Krupiński-Suszec
1988	Poland	Zdzisław Krudysz	Gwardia Katowice
1989	Poland	Zbigniew Piątek	Legia Warsaw
1990	Poland	Andrzej Mąkowski	Romet Bydgoszcz
1991	Poland	Jacek Bodyk	VC Aulnat Sayat
1992– 1993	No race		
1994	Poland	Piotr Przydział	Krupiński-Abpol ICC Suszec
1995	Poland	Tomasz Brożyna	Delta-Meble Korona Kielce
1996	Poland	Andrzej Mierzejewski	Mróz
1997	Latvia	Dainis Ozols	Mróz
1998	Poland	Zbigniew Piątek	Mróz
1999	Poland	Tomasz Brożyna	Mróz
2000	Poland	Grzegorz Rosoliński	Servisco
2001	Poland	Zbigniew Piątek	Mróz–Supradyn Witaminy
2002	Poland	Radosław Romanik	CCC–Polsat
2003	Poland	Cezary Zamana	Action Nvidia–Mróz
2004	Czech Republic	Ondřej Fadrny	PSK Whirlpool
2005	Poland	Cezary Zamana	Action–Ati
2006	Poland	Marek Rutkiewicz	Intel–Action
2007	Poland	Mateusz Komar	DHL–Author
2008	Poland	Marcin Sapa	DHL–Author
2009	Poland	Artur Detko	DHL–Author
2010	Poland	Jacek Morajko	Mróz–Active Jet
2011	Poland	Tomasz Marczyński	CCC–Polsat–Polkowice
2012	Poland	Marek Rutkiewicz	CCC–Polkowice
2013	Poland	Łukasz Bodnar	Bank BGŻ
2014	Germany	Maximilian Werda	Team Stölting
2015	Slovenia	Marko Kump	Adria Mobil
2016	Poland	Mateusz Taciak	CCC–Sprandi–Polkowice
2017	Poland	Maciej Paterski	CCC–Sprandi–Polkowice
2018	Portugal	Amaro Antunes	CCC–Sprandi–Polkowice
2019	Poland	Adam Stachowiak	Voster ATS Team
2020	Czech Republic	Vojtěch Řepa	Topforex–Lapierre
2021	Czech Republic	Michal Schlegel	Elkov–Kasper
2022	Germany	Jonas Rapp	Hrinkow Advarics
2023	Hungary	Márton Dina	ATT Investments
2024	Austria	Riccardo Zoidl	Team Felt–Felbermayr
2025	Italy	Alexander Konychev	Team Vorarlberg
2026	Switzerland	Colin Stüssi	Team Vorarlberg

== See also ==
- Tour de Pologne
- Sport in Poland
- Road bicycle racing
