= Dookoła Mazowsza =

Cycling race in Poland

Race details
- Date: Late July
- Region: Mazovia, Poland
- English name: Around Mazovia
- Local name(s): Wyścig Dookoła Mazowsza
- Discipline: Road
- Competition: UCI Europe Tour
- Type: Stage race
- Organiser: Mazovia Team
- Web site: dookolamazowsza.pl

History
- First edition: 1951
- Editions: 68 (as of 2025)
- First winner: Stanisław Zalewski (POL)
- Most wins: Zenon Czechowski (POL) (4 wins)
- Most recent: Šimon Vaníček (CZE)

The Dookoła Mazowsza (Around Mazovia) is a cycling race held annually in Mazovia, Poland. It was first held in 1951 and has been held annually since, with the exceptions of 1981–1982, 1991–1992, and 1994–1996. The most successful rider is Zenon Czechowski, who won the race four times between 1969 and 1972. Since 2005, it has been part of the UCI Europe Tour, classified as a 2.1 race in 2005 and since 2006 as a 2.2 race.

== Past winners ==
Year	Country	Rider	Team
1951	Poland	Edward Zalewski	
1952	Poland	Jan Śpiewak	
1953	Poland	Andrzej Selma	
1954	Poland	Henryk Figiel	
1955	Poland	Jan Żelazny	
1956	Poland	Roman Sitarski	
1957	Poland	Wacław Wrzesiński	
1958	Poland	Stanisław Królak	
1959	Poland	Henryk Kowalski	
1960	Poland	Kazimierz Bednarczyk	
1961	Poland	Witold Krawczyński	
1962	Poland	Józef Jochem	
1963	Poland	Franciszek Porwoł	
1964	Poland	Henryk Woźniak	
1965	Poland	Jan Kudra	
1966	Poland	Henryk Woźniak	
1967	Poland	Henryk Woźniak	
1968	Poland	Andrzej Bławdzin	
1969	Poland	Zenon Czechowski	
1970	Poland	Zenon Czechowski	
1971	Poland	Zenon Czechowski	
1972	Poland	Zenon Czechowski	
1973	Poland	Tadeusz Smyrak	
1974	Poland	Juliusz Firkowski	
1975	Poland	Mieczysław Klimczyk	
1976	Poland	Marian Majkowski	
1977	Poland	Ryszard Szurkowski	
1978	Poland	Ryszard Szurkowski	
1979	Poland	Roman Cieślak	
1980	Poland	Lechosław Michalak	
1981– 1982	No race		
1983	Poland	Marek Leśniewski	
1984	Poland	Sławomir Krawczyk	
1985	Poland	Jan Leśniewski	
1986	Poland	Sławomir Krawczyk	
1987	Poland	Edward Kaczmarczyk	
1988	Poland	Zbigniew Piątek	
1989	Poland	Andrzej Sypytkowski	
1990– 1992	No race		
1993	Poland	Dariusz Habel	
1994– 1996	No race		
1997	Poland	Mariusz Bilewski	
1998	Poland	Tomasz Kłoczko	
1999	Poland	Wiktor Ułanowski	
2000	Poland	Przemysław Mikołajczyk	Atlas-Lukullus-Ambra
2001	Poland	Kacper Sowiński	Legia-Bazyliszek
2002	Poland	Jacek Mickiewicz	CCC–Polsat
2003	Poland	Dariusz Rudnicki	Legia-Bazyliszek
2004	Poland	Adam Wadecki	Action-Ati
2005	Poland	Piotr Zaradny	Knauf Team
2006	Poland	Tomasz Kiendyś	Knauf Team
2007	Poland	Marek Wesoły	CCC–Polsat–Polkowice
2008	Poland	Marcin Sapa	DHL-Author
2009	Poland	Łukasz Bodnar	CCC–Polsat–Polkowice
2010	Germany	Sebastian Forke	Team Nutrixxion-Sparkasse
2011	Poland	Robert Radosz	BDC Team
2012	Poland	Mateusz Taciak	CCC–Polkowice
2013	Poland	Marcin Sapa	BDC–Marcpol Team
2014	Poland	Jarosław Marycz	CCC–Polsat–Polkowice
2015	Poland	Grzegorz Stepniak	CCC–Sprandi–Polkowice
2016	Finland	Matti Manninen	Team Bliz–Merida
2017	Czech Republic	Alois Kaňkovský	Elkov–Author
2018	Poland	Szymon Sajnok	CCC–Sprandi–Polkowice
2019	Poland	Stanislaw Aniolkowski	CCC Development Team
2020	Czech Republic	Michael Kukrle	Elkov–Kasper
2021	Norway	Eirik Lunder	Team Coop
2022	Poland	Marceli Bogusławski	HRE Mazowsze Serce Polski
2023	Israel	Oded Kogut	Israel (national team)
2024	Poland	Bartłomiej Proć	Santic–Wibatech
2025	Czech Republic	Šimon Vaníček	ATT Investments
