= Bałtyk–Karkonosze Tour =

Polish multi-day road cycling race

Race details
- Date: May
- Region: West Poland
- English name: Baltic–Karkonosze Tour
- Local name: Wyścig Bałtyk–Karkonosze
- Discipline: Road
- Competition: UCI Europe Tour (2005–2009, 2015–)
- Type: Stage race
- Organiser: Towarzystwo Kolarskie „Karkonosze Tour”
- Web site: www.baltyk-karkonosze.com

History
- First edition: 1993
- Editions: 28 (as of 2020)
- First winner: Radosław Romanik (POL)
- Most wins: Radosław Romanik (POL) (6 wins)
- Most recent: Stanisław Aniołkowski (POL)

The Bałtyk–Karkonosze Tour is a cycling race in West Poland that runs between the Baltic Sea and the Karkonosze. The first edition was held in 1993 as an amateur race as the Karkonosze Tour with stages in the Wałbrzych Voivodeship and Jelenia Góra Voivodeship. In 1996, the race became professional. In 1997, it adopted the current North–South route. The race was part of the UCI Europe Tour from 2005 to 2009, went down to National Event status from 2010 to 2014, before returning to the UCI Europe Tour in 2015.

== Past winners ==
Year	Country	Rider	Team
1993	Poland	Radosław Romanik	
1994	Poland	Radosław Romanik	
1995	Poland	Radosław Romanik	
1996	Poland	Radosław Romanik	
1997	Poland	Andrzej Sypytkowski	
1998	Poland	Piotr Chmielewski	
1999	Lithuania	Raimondas Rumšas	Mróz
2000	Poland	Robert Radosz	Atlas-Ambra-Lukullus
2001	Poland	Piotr Przydział	Ceresit–CCC–Mat
2002	Ukraine	Oleksandr Klymenko	Mróz–Supradyn Witaminy
2003	Ukraine	Oleksandr Klymenko	Action Nvidia–Mróz
2004	Poland	Sławomir Kohut	Hoop–CCC–Polsat
2005	Poland	Radosław Romanik	DHL–Author
2006	Poland	Bartłomiej Matysiak	Legia-Bazyliszek
2007	Slovakia	Roman Broniš	DHL–Author
2008	Poland	Radosław Romanik	DHL–Author
2009	Russia	Sergey Kolesnikov	Moscow Velosport
2010	Ukraine	Vladimir Duma	Romet Weltour Dębica
2011	Poland	Robert Radosz	BDC Team
2012	Bulgaria	Nikolay Mihaylov	CCC–Polkowice
2013	Poland	Mateusz Taciak	CCC–Polsat–Polkowice
2014	Germany	Christopher Hatz	MLP Team Bergstraße
2015	Poland	Leszek Pluciński	CCC–Sprandi–Polkowice
2016	Poland	Mateusz Taciak	CCC–Sprandi–Polkowice
2017	Poland	Marek Rutkiewicz	Wibatech 7R Fuji
2018	Germany	Philipp Walsleben	Corendon–Circus
2019	Poland	Kamil Małecki	CCC Development Team
2020	Poland	Stanisław Aniołkowski	CCC Development Team
2021	No race		
