= Course de Solidarność et des Champions Olympiques =

Polish multi-day road cycling race

Course de la Solidarité Olympique
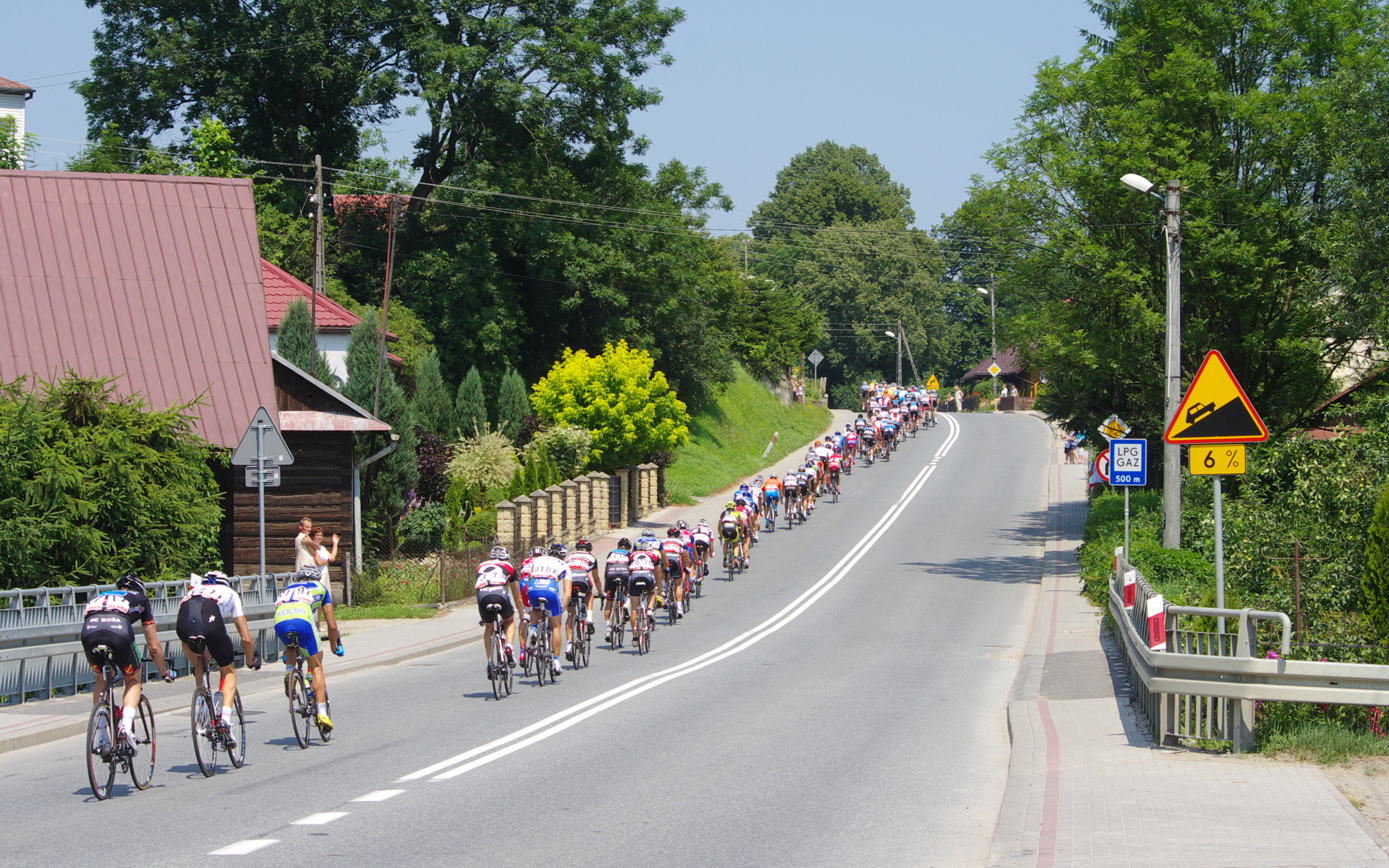
- 23rd edition, the last stage via Dynów

Race details
- Date: Early July
- Region: Poland
- English name: Race of Solidarity and Olympics
- Local name: Wyścig Solidarności i Olimpijczyków (in Polish)
- Discipline: Road
- Competition: UCI Europe Tour
- Type: Stage race
- Organiser: NSZZ „Solidarność” Region Łódź
- Web site: www.wyscig.com.pl

History
- First edition: 1990
- Editions: 37 (as of 2026)
- First winner: Czeslaw Rajch (POL)
- Most wins: Tomasz Brożyna (POL) (4 wins)
- Most recent: Marceli Bogusławski (POL)

The Course de Solidarność et des Champions Olympiques, also known as the Course de la Solidarité Olympique (Polish: Wyścig Solidarności i Olimpijczyków; English: Race of Solidarity and Olympics) is a road bicycle racing stage race held annually in Poland. From 1991 until 1995, it was a race for amateurs, becoming a professional race in 1996. It was classified as a 2.3 event from 2002 to 2004, a 2.1 event on the UCI Europe Tour from 2005 to 2013, and since 2014 as a 2.2 event.

== Winners ==
Year	Country	Rider	Team
1990	Poland	Czesław Rajch	
1991	Poland	Tomasz Brożyna	
1992	Russia	Evgeni Berzin	
1993	Poland	Dariusz Baranowski	
1994	Lithuania	Raimondas Rumšas	
1995	Poland	Artur Krasiński	
1996	Poland	Tomasz Brożyna	
1997	Poland	Piotr Wadecki	Mróz
1998	Poland	Tomasz Brożyna	Mróz
1999	Poland	Tomasz Brożyna	Mróz
2000	Lithuania	Remigijus Lupeikis	Mróz–Supradyn Witaminy
2001	Czech Republic	Ondřej Sosenka	Ceresit–CCC–Mat
2002	Poland	Radosław Romanik	CCC–Polsat
2003	Russia	Oleg Zhukov	Moscow City Sport Association
2004	Ukraine	Bogdan Bondariew	Action
2005	Poland	Piotr Wadecki	Action–Ati
2006	Poland	Robert Radosz	DHL–Author
2007	Poland	Łukasz Bodnar	Intel–Action
2008	Poland	Łukasz Bodnar	DHL–Author
2009	Poland	Artur Król	Centri della Calzatura
2010	Poland	Jacek Morajko	Mróz–Active Jet
2011	Poland	Marcin Sapa	Polska Szosowa
2012	Poland	Mariusz Witecki	Bank BGŻ
2013	Ukraine	Vitaly Popkov	ISD Continental Team
2014	Poland	Kamil Zieliński	Mexller
2015	Netherlands	Johim Ariesen	Metec–TKH
2016	Belarus	Yauhen Sobal	Minsk Cycling Club
2017	Poland	Mateusz Komar	Voster Uniwheels Team
2018	Poland	Sylwester Janiszewski	Wibatech Merx 7R
2019	Estonia	Norman Vahtra	Klubi Cycling Tartu
2020	Poland	Stanisław Aniołkowski	CCC Development Team
2021	Czech Republic	Jan Bárta	Elkov–Kasper
2022	Belgium	Timo Kielich	Alpecin–Fenix Development Team
2023	Estonia	Siim Kiskonen	Tartu2024 Cycling Team
2024	Poland	Tobiasz Pawlak	Mazowsze Serce Polski
2025	Poland	Marceli Bogusławski	ATT Investments
2026	Poland	Marceli Bogusławski	ATT Investments
