= 2015 CCC–Sprandi–Polkowice season =

CCC–Sprandi–Polkowice
- 2015 season
- UCI code: CCC
- Status: UCI Professional Continental
- Manager: Marek Leśniewski
- Main sponsor(s): CCC & Sprandi & Polkowice
- Based: Poland
- Bicycles: Guerciotti
- Groupset: Shimano

Season victories
- One-day races: 2
- Stage race overall: 3
- Stage race stages: 10

The 2015 season for the CCC–Sprandi–Polkowice cycling team began in February at the 2015 Vuelta a Andalucía. The team participated in UCI Europe Tour races and UCI World Tour events when given a wildcard invitation.

== 2015 roster ==
Rider	Date of birth
Grega Bole (SLO)	13 August 1985 (aged 29)
Piotr Brozyna (POL)	17 February 1995 (aged 20)
Josef Černý (CZE)	11 May 1993 (aged 21)
Cristian Delle Stelle (ITA)	4 February 1989 (aged 26)
Jan Hirt (CZE)	21 January 1991 (aged 24)
Adrian Honkisz (POL)	27 February 1988 (aged 26)
Jakub Kaczmarek (POL)	27 September 1993 (aged 21)
Tomasz Kiendyś (POL)	23 June 1977 (aged 37)
Adrian Kurek (POL)	29 March 1988 (aged 26)
Eryk Laton (POL)	22 August 1993 (aged 21)
Kamil Malecki (POL)	2 January 1996 (aged 19)
Jarosław Marycz (POL)	17 April 1987 (aged 27)
Bartłomiej Matysiak (POL)	11 September 1984 (aged 30)

Rider	Date of birth
Nikolay Mihaylov (BUL)	8 April 1988 (aged 26)
Łukasz Owsian (POL)	24 February 1990 (aged 24)
Michal Paluta (POL)	14 October 1995 (aged 19)
Maciej Paterski (POL)	12 September 1986 (aged 28)
Leszek Plucinski (POL)	3 June 1990 (aged 24)
Davide Rebellin (ITA)	9 August 1971 (aged 43)
Marek Rutkiewicz (POL)	8 May 1981 (aged 33)
Branislau Samoilau (BLR)	25 May 1985 (aged 29)
Stefan Schumacher (GER)	21 July 1981 (aged 33)
Grzegorz Stępniak (POL)	24 April 1989 (aged 25)
Patryk Stosz (POL)	15 July 1994 (aged 20)
Sylwester Szmyd (POL)	2 March 1978 (aged 36)
Mateusz Taciak (POL)	19 June 1984 (aged 30)

Riders who joined the team for the 2015 season

Rider	2014 team
Grega Bole	Vini Fantini–Nippo
Piotr Brozyna	neo-pro (Telco'm-Gimex)
Cristian Delle Stelle	MG.Kvis-Wilier
Jan Hirt	neo-pro (Etixx)
Jakub Kaczmarek	neo-pro (Telco'm-Gimex)
Eryk Laton	neo-pro (BDC-Marcpol)
Kamil Malecki	neo-pro
Michal Paluta	neo-pro (TKK Pacific Torum)
Leszek Plucinski	neo-pro (BDC-Marcpol)
Stefan Schumacher	Christina Watches–Dana
Patryk Stosz	neo-pro (TC Chobry Lasocki Głogów)
Sylwester Szmyd	Movistar Team

Riders who left the team during or after the 2014 season

Rider	2015 team
Pawel Charucki	
Piotr Gawronski	
Tomasz Marczyński	Torku-Şekerspor
Jacek Morajko	Wibatech Fuji Żory
Mateusz Nowak	

== Season victories ==
Date	Race	Competition	Rider	Country	Location
23 March	Volta a Catalunya, Stage 1	UCI World Tour	Maciej Paterski (POL)	Spain	Calella
26 March	Settimana Internazionale di Coppi e Bartali, Stage 1b	UCI Europe Tour	Team time trial (Note: In this team time trial, squads were split into two mini-teams. The winning riders were Davide Rebellin, Tomasz Kiendyś, Adrian Kurek and Jarosław Marycz. Also part of the squad at the event were Christian Delle Stelle, Grega Bole, Bartłomiej Matysiak and Nikolay Mihaylov)	Italy	Gatteo
22 April	Tour of Croatia, Stage 1	UCI Europe Tour	Grega Bole (SLO)	Croatia	Split
24 April	Tour of Croatia, Stage 3	UCI Europe Tour	Maciej Paterski (POL)	Croatia	Učka
26 April	Tour of Croatia, Stage 5	UCI Europe Tour	Maciej Paterski (POL)	Croatia	Zagreb
26 April	Tour of Croatia, Overall	UCI Europe Tour	Maciej Paterski (POL)	Croatia	
26 April	Tour of Croatia, Points classification	UCI Europe Tour	Maciej Paterski (POL)	Croatia	
26 April	Tour of Croatia, Mountains classification	UCI Europe Tour	Maciej Paterski (POL)	Croatia	
26 April	Tour of Croatia, Teams classification	UCI Europe Tour	(Note: The riders on the squad were Sylwester Szmyd, Grega Bole, Adrian Kurek, Jarosław Marycz, Bartłomiej Matysiak, Maciej Paterski, Marek Rutkiewicz and Branislau Samoilau)	Croatia	
28 April	Tour of Turkey, Stage 3	UCI Europe Tour	Davide Rebellin (ITA)	Turkey	Elmalı
9 May	Szlakiem Grodów Piastowskich, Teams classification	UCI Europe Tour	(Note: The riders on the squad were Mateusz Taciak, Jan Hirt, Stefan Schumacher, Tomasz Kiendyś, Adrian Honkisz, Leszek Pluciński, Adrian Kurek and Josef Černý)	Poland	
21 May	Bałtyk–Karkonosze Tour, Stage 2	UCI Europe Tour	Grzegorz Stępniak (POL)	Poland	Wolin
24 May	Bałtyk–Karkonosze Tour, Stage 5	UCI Europe Tour	Mateusz Taciak (POL)	Poland	Okraj
24 May	Bałtyk–Karkonosze Tour, Overall	UCI Europe Tour	Leszek Pluciński (POL)	Poland	
24 May	Bałtyk–Karkonosze Tour, Teams classification	UCI Europe Tour	(Note: The riders on the squad were Adrian Honkisz, Jakub Kaczmarek, Tomasz Kiendyś, Eryk Latoń, Michał Paluta, Leszek Pluciński, Grzegorz Stępniak and Mateusz Taciak)	Poland	
14 June	Tour of Małopolska, Stage 3	UCI Europe Tour	Adrian Kurek (POL)	Poland	Stary Sącz
24 July	Podlasie Tour, Prologue	UCI Europe Tour	Adrian Kurek (POL)	Poland	Czyżew
1 August	Dookoła Mazowsza, Overall	UCI Europe Tour	Grzegorz Stępniak (POL)	Poland	
8 August	Tour de Pologne, Mountains classification	UCI World Tour	Maciej Paterski (POL)	Poland	
9 August	Coupe des Carpathes	UCI Europe Tour	Adrian Honkisz (POL)	Poland	Sucha Beskidzka
16 September	Coppa Ugo Agostoni	UCI Europe Tour	Davide Rebellin (ITA)	Italy	Lissone
