= List of CCC Development Team rosters =

This is a list of the rosters of the Pro-continental cycling team, CCC Development Team, by season.

== 2020 ==
As of 16 March 2020.

Rider	Date of birth
Stanisław Aniołkowski (POL)	20 January 1997 (aged 22)
Michał Gałka (POL)	19 April 2001 (aged 18)
Dominik Gorak (POL)	12 October 2001 (aged 18)
Michał Jaskot (POL)	26 May 2001 (aged 18)
Petr Kelemen (CZE)	18 November 2000 (aged 19)
Szymon Krawczyk (POL)	8 August 1998 (aged 21)

Rider	Date of birth
Savva Novikov (RUS)	27 July 1999 (aged 20)
Damian Papierski (POL)	26 January 2000 (aged 19)
Piotr Pekala (POL)	4 August 1998 (aged 21)
Szymon Tracz (POL)	12 November 1998 (aged 21)
Kacper Walkowiak (POL)	5 January 2000 (aged 19)
Karol Wawrzyniak (POL)	19 April 2000 (aged 19)

== 2018 ==
As of 8 January 2018.

Rider	Date of birth
Amaro Antunes (POR)	27 November 1990 (aged 27)
Alan Banaszek (POL)	30 October 1997 (aged 20)
Paweł Bernas (POL)	24 May 1990 (aged 27)
Piotr Brożyna (POL)	17 February 1995 (aged 22)
Paweł Cieślik (POL)	12 April 1986 (aged 31)
Paweł Franczak (POL)	7 October 1991 (aged 26)
Kamil Gradek (POL)	17 September 1990 (aged 27)
Jonas Koch (GER)	25 June 1993 (aged 24)
Marko Kump (SLO)	9 September 1988 (aged 29)
Adrian Kurek (POL)	29 March 1988 (aged 29)

Rider	Date of birth
Kamil Małecki (POL)	2 January 1996 (aged 21)
Łukasz Owsian (POL)	24 February 1990 (aged 27)
Michał Paluta (POL)	4 October 1995 (aged 22)
Leszek Pluciński (POL)	3 June 1990 (aged 27)
Szymon Sajnok (POL)	24 August 1997 (aged 20)
Michal Schlegel (CZE)	31 May 1995 (aged 22)
František Sisr (CZE)	17 March 1993 (aged 24)
Patryk Stosz (POL)	15 July 1994 (aged 23)
Mateusz Taciak (POL)	19 June 1984 (aged 33)
Jan Tratnik (SLO)	23 February 1990 (aged 27)

== 2017 ==
Rider	Date of birth
Alan Banaszek (POL)	30 October 1997 (aged 19)
Marcin Białobłocki (POL)	2 July 1983 (aged 33)
Piotr Brożyna (POL)	17 February 1995 (aged 21)
Felix Großschartner (AUT)	23 December 1993 (aged 23)
Jan Hirt (CZE)	21 January 1991 (aged 25)
Jakub Kaczmarek (POL)	27 September 1993 (aged 23)
Adrian Kurek (POL)	29 March 1988 (aged 28)
Kamil Małecki (POL)	2 January 1996 (aged 20)
Nikolay Mihaylov (BUL)	8 April 1988 (aged 28)
Marcin Mrożek (POL)	26 February 1990 (aged 26)
Łukasz Owsian (POL)	24 February 1990 (aged 26)

Rider	Date of birth
Michał Paluta (POL)	14 October 1995 (aged 21)
Maciej Paterski (POL)	12 September 1986 (aged 30)
Leszek Pluciński (POL)	3 June 1990 (aged 26)
Simone Ponzi (ITA)	17 January 1987 (aged 29)
Branislau Samoilau (BLR)	25 May 1985 (aged 31)
Michal Schlegel (CZE)	31 May 1995 (aged 21)
František Sisr (CZE)	17 March 1993 (aged 23)
Patryk Stosz (POL)	15 July 1994 (aged 22)
Mateusz Taciak (POL)	19 June 1984 (aged 32)
Jan Tratnik (SLO)	23 February 1990 (aged 26)

== 2016 ==
Roster in 2016, age as of 1 January 2016:

Rider	Date of birth
Alan Banaszek (POL)	30 October 1997 (aged 18)
Piotr Brożyna (POL)	17 February 1995 (aged 20)
Josef Černý (CZE)	11 May 1993 (aged 22)
Víctor de la Parte (ESP)	22 June 1986 (aged 29)
Felix Großschartner (AUT)	23 December 1993 (aged 22)
Jan Hirt (CZE)	21 January 1991 (aged 24)
Adrian Honkisz (POL)	27 February 1988 (aged 27)
Jakub Kaczmarek (POL)	27 September 1993 (aged 22)
Tomasz Kiendyś (POL)	23 June 1977 (aged 38)
Adrian Kurek (POL)	29 March 1988 (aged 27)
Eryk Latoń (POL)	22 August 1993 (aged 22)
Kamil Małecki (POL)	2 January 1996 (aged 19)
Jarosław Marycz (POL)	17 April 1987 (aged 28)
Bartłomiej Matysiak (POL)	11 September 1984 (aged 31)

Rider	Date of birth
Nikolay Mihaylov (POL)	April 8, 1988 (aged 27)
Marcin Mrożek (POL)	26 February 1990 (aged 25)
Łukasz Owsian (POL)	24 February 1990 (aged 25)
Michał Paluta (POL)	4 October 1995 (aged 20)
Maciej Paterski (POL)	12 September 1986 (aged 29)
Leszek Pluciński (POL)	3 June 1990 (aged 25)
Simone Ponzi (ITA)	17 January 1987 (aged 28)
Davide Rebellin (ITA)	9 August 1971 (aged 44)
Branislau Samoilau (BLR)	25 May 1985 (aged 30)
Grzegorz Stępniak (POL)	24 April 1989 (aged 26)
Patryk Stosz (POL)	15 July 1994 (aged 21)
Sylwester Szmyd (POL)	2 March 1978 (aged 37)
Mateusz Taciak (POL)	19 June 1984 (aged 31)

== 2015 ==
As of 8 March 2015.

Rider	Date of birth
Grega Bole (SLO)	13 August 1985 (aged 29)
Piotr Brożyna (POL)	17 February 1995 (aged 19)
Josef Černý (CZE)	11 May 1993 (aged 21)
Christian Delle Stelle (ITA)	4 February 1989 (aged 25)
Jan Hirt (CZE)	21 January 1991 (aged 23)
Adrian Honkisz (POL)	27 February 1988 (aged 26)
Jakub Kaczmarek (POL)	27 September 1993 (aged 21)
Tomasz Kiendyś (POL)	23 June 1977 (aged 37)
Adrian Kurek (POL)	29 March 1988 (aged 26)
Eryk Latoń (POL)	22 August 1993 (aged 21)
Kamil Małecki (POL)	2 January 1996 (aged 18)
Jarosław Marycz (POL)	17 April 1987 (aged 27)
Bartłomiej Matysiak (POL)	11 September 1984 (aged 30)

Rider	Date of birth
Nikolay Mihaylov (BUL)	8 April 1988 (aged 26)
Łukasz Owsian (POL)	24 February 1990 (aged 24)
Michał Paluta (POL)	14 October 1995 (aged 19)
Maciej Paterski (POL)	12 September 1986 (aged 28)
Leszek Pluciński (POL)	3 June 1990 (aged 24)
Davide Rebellin (ITA)	9 August 1971 (aged 43)
Marek Rutkiewicz (POL)	8 May 1981 (aged 33)
Branislau Samoilau (BLR)	25 May 1985 (aged 29)
Stefan Schumacher (GER)	21 July 1981 (aged 33)
Grzegorz Stępniak (POL)	24 April 1989 (aged 25)
Patryk Stosz (POL)	15 July 1994 (aged 20)
Sylwester Szmyd (POL)	2 March 1978 (aged 36)
Mateusz Taciak (POL)	19 June 1984 (aged 30)

== 2014 ==
As of 4 March 2014.

Rider	Date of birth
Josef Černý (CZE)	11 May 1993 (aged 20)
Paweł Charucki (POL)	14 October 1988 (aged 25)
Piotr Gawronski (POL)	25 March 1990 (aged 23)
Adrian Honkisz (POL)	27 February 1988 (aged 25)
Tomasz Kiendyś (POL)	23 June 1977 (aged 36)
Adrian Kurek (POL)	29 March 1988 (aged 25)
Tomasz Marczyński (POL)	6 March 1984 (aged 29)
Jarosław Marycz (POL)	17 April 1987 (aged 26)
Bartłomiej Matysiak (POL)	11 September 1984 (aged 29)
Nikolay Mihaylov (BUL)	8 April 1988 (aged 25)

Rider	Date of birth
Jacek Morajko (POL)	26 April 1981 (aged 32)
Mateusz Nowak (POL)	15 July 1992 (aged 21)
Łukasz Owsian (POL)	24 February 1990 (aged 23)
Maciej Paterski (POL)	12 September 1986 (aged 27)
Davide Rebellin (ITA)	9 August 1971 (aged 42)
Marek Rutkiewicz (POL)	8 May 1981 (aged 32)
Branislau Samoilau (BLR)	25 May 1985 (aged 28)
Grzegorz Stępniak (POL)	24 April 1989 (aged 24)
Mateusz Taciak (POL)	19 June 1984 (aged 29)

== 2013 ==
As of 1 January 2013.

Rider	Date of birth
Josef Černý (CZE)	11 May 1993 (aged 19)
Paweł Charucki (POL)	14 October 1988 (aged 24)
Piotr Gawronski (POL)	25 March 1990 (aged 22)
Adrian Honkisz (POL)	27 February 1988 (aged 24)
Sylwester Janiszewski (POL)	24 January 1988 (aged 24)
Tomasz Kiendyś (POL)	23 June 1977 (aged 35)
Adrian Kurek (POL)	29 March 1988 (aged 24)
Bartłomiej Matysiak (POL)	11 September 1984 (aged 28)

Rider	Date of birth
Nikolay Mihaylov (BUL)	8 April 1988 (aged 24)
Jacek Morajko (POL)	26 April 1981 (aged 31)
Mateusz Nowak (POL)	15 July 1992 (aged 20)
Łukasz Owsian (POL)	24 February 1990 (aged 22)
Davide Rebellin (ITA)	9 August 1971 (aged 41)
Marek Rutkiewicz (POL)	8 May 1981 (aged 31)
Grzegorz Stępniak (POL)	24 April 1989 (aged 23)
Mateusz Taciak (POL)	19 June 1984 (aged 28)

== 2012 ==
As of 2 February 2012.

Rider	Date of birth
Dariusz Batek (POL)	27 April 1986 (aged 25)
Paweł Charucki (POL)	14 October 1988 (aged 23)
Piotr Gawronski (POL)	25 March 1990 (aged 21)
Adrian Honkisz (POL)	27 February 1988 (aged 23)
Sylwester Janiszewski (POL)	24 January 1988 (aged 23)
Tomasz Kiendyś (POL)	23 June 1977 (aged 34)
Bartłomiej Matysiak (POL)	11 September 1984 (aged 27)

Rider	Date of birth
Nikolay Mihaylov (BUL)	8 April 1988 (aged 23)
Łukasz Owsian (POL)	24 February 1990 (aged 21)
Rafał Ratajczyk (POL)	5 April 1983 (aged 28)
Marek Rutkiewicz (POL)	8 May 1981 (aged 30)
Grzegorz Stępniak (POL)	24 April 1989 (aged 22)
Mateusz Taciak (POL)	19 June 1984 (aged 27)
Kamil Zieliński (POL)	3 March 1988 (aged 23)

== 2011 ==
Rider	Date of birth
Dariusz Batek (POL)	27 April 1986 (aged 24)
Łukasz Bodnar (POL)	10 May 1982 (aged 28)
Pawel Charucki (POL)	14 October 1988 (aged 22)
Adrian Honkisz (POL)	27 February 1988 (aged 22)
Blazej Janiaczyk (POL)	27 January 1983 (aged 27)
Sylwester Janiszewski (POL)	24 January 1988 (aged 22)
Tomasz Kiendyś (POL)	23 June 1977 (aged 33)
Tomasz Marczyński (POL)	6 March 1984 (aged 26)
Bartłomiej Matysiak (POL)	11 September 1984 (aged 26)

Rider	Date of birth
José João Mendes (POR)	24 April 1985 (aged 25)
Jacek Morajko (POL)	26 April 1981 (aged 29)
Rafał Ratajczyk (POL)	5 April 1983 (aged 27)
Marek Rutkiewicz (POL)	8 May 1981 (aged 29)
André Schulze (GER)	21 November 1974 (aged 36)
Tomasz Smolen (POL)	3 February 1983 (aged 27)
Mateusz Taciak (POL)	19 June 1984 (aged 26)
Mariusz Witecki (POL)	10 May 1981 (aged 29)
Kamil Zieliński (POL)	3 March 1988 (aged 22)

== 2010 ==
Rider	Date of birth
Dariusz Batek (POL)	27 April 1986 (aged 23)
Łukasz Bodnar (POL)	10 May 1982 (aged 27)
Alexander Dorozala (POL)	14 September 1985 (aged 24)
Adrian Honkisz (POL)	27 February 1988 (aged 21)
Sylwester Janiszewski (POL)	24 January 1988 (aged 21)
Krzysztof Jeżowski (POL)	30 August 1975 (aged 34)
Tomasz Kiendyś (POL)	23 June 1977 (aged 32)
Tomasz Lisowicz (POL)	23 February 1977 (aged 32)

Rider	Date of birth
Tomasz Marczyński (POL)	6 March 1984 (aged 25)
Bartłomiej Matysiak (POL)	11 September 1984 (aged 25)
Jarosław Rebiewski (POL)	27 February 1974 (aged 35)
Tomasz Repinski (POL)	27 January 1987 (aged 22)
Tomasz Smolen (POL)	3 February 1983 (aged 26)
Adam Sznitko (POL)	20 December 1984 (aged 25)
Marcin Tomaszewski (POL)	9 August 1974 (aged 35)
Kamil Zieliński (POL)	3 March 1988 (aged 21)
