= 2014 CCC Polsat Polkowice season =

2014 CCC Polsat Polkowice season
Manager	Marek Leśniewski
One-day victories	3
Stage race overall victories	3
Stage race stage victories	8
Previous season • Next season

The 2014 season for the CCC–Polsat–Polkowice cycling team began in February at the Grand Prix d'Ouverture La Marseillaise. The team participated in UCI Europe Tour races and UCI World Tour events when given a wildcard invitation.

== 2014 roster ==
As of 4 March 2014.

Rider	Date of birth
Josef Černý (CZE)	11 May 1993 (aged 20)
Paweł Charucki (POL)	14 October 1988 (aged 25)
Piotr Gawronski (POL)	25 March 1990 (aged 23)
Adrian Honkisz (POL)	27 February 1988 (aged 26)
Tomasz Kiendyś (POL)	23 June 1977 (aged 36)
Adrian Kurek (POL)	29 March 1988 (aged 25)
Tomasz Marczyński (POL)	6 March 1984 (aged 29)
Jarosław Marycz (POL)	17 April 1987 (aged 26)
Bartłomiej Matysiak (POL)	11 September 1984 (aged 29)
Nikolay Mihaylov (BUL)	8 April 1988 (aged 25)

Rider	Date of birth
Jacek Morajko (POL)	26 April 1981 (aged 32)
Mateusz Nowak (POL)	15 July 1992 (aged 21)
Łukasz Owsian (POL)	24 February 1990 (aged 24)
Maciej Paterski (POL)	12 September 1986 (aged 27)
Davide Rebellin (ITA)	9 August 1971 (aged 42)
Marek Rutkiewicz (POL)	8 May 1981 (aged 32)
Branislau Samoilau (BLR)	25 May 1985 (aged 28)
Grzegorz Stępniak (POL)	24 April 1989 (aged 24)
Mateusz Taciak (POL)	19 June 1984 (aged 29)

Riders who joined the team for the 2014 season

Rider	2013 team
Tomasz Marczyński	Vacansoleil–DCM
Maciej Paterski	Cannondale
Branislau Samoilau	ex-pro (Movistar Team, 2012)

Riders who left the team during or after the 2013 season

Rider	2014 team
Sylwester Janiszewski	

== Season victories ==
Date	Race	Competition	Rider	Country	Location
11 May	Szlakiem Grodów Piastowskich, Overall	UCI Europe Tour	Mateusz Taciak (POL)	Poland	
11 May	Szlakiem Grodów Piastowskich, Points classification	UCI Europe Tour	Marek Rutkiewicz (POL)	Poland	
11 May	Szlakiem Grodów Piastowskich, Mountains classification	UCI Europe Tour	Łukasz Owsian (POL)	Poland	
11 May	Szlakiem Grodów Piastowskich, Teams classification	UCI Europe Tour	(Note: The riders on the squad were Mateusz Taciak, Marek Rutkiewicz, Davide Rebellin, Tomasz Marczyński, Jarosław Marycz, Maciej Paterski, Łukasz Owsian and Bartłomiej Matysiak)	Poland	
15 May	Visegrad 4 Bicycle Race – GP Czech Republic	UCI Europe Tour	Josef Černý (CZE)	Czech Republic	Brno
25 May	Tour of Norway, Overall	UCI Europe Tour	Maciej Paterski (POL)	Norway	
31 May	Tour of Estonia, Stage 2	UCI Europe Tour	Adrian Kurek (POL)	Estonia	Tartu
31 May	Tour of Estonia, Teams classification	UCI Europe Tour	(Note: The riders on the squad were Bartłomiej Matysiak, Piotr Gawroński, Nikolay Mihaylov, Paweł Charucki, Adrian Kurek, Tomasz Kiendyś and Grzegorz Stępniak)	Estonia	
12 June	Tour of Małopolska, Stage 1	UCI Europe Tour	Bartłomiej Matysiak (POL)	Poland	Trzebinia
21 June	Memorial Grundmanna I Wizowskiego, Stage 1	UCI Europe Tour	Bartłomiej Matysiak (POL)	Poland	Grodowiec
3 July	Course de la Solidarité Olympique, Stage 3	UCI Europe Tour	Grzegorz Stępniak (POL)	Poland	Kielce
5 July	Course de la Solidarité Olympique, Stage 5	UCI Europe Tour	Jacek Morajko (POL)	Poland	Jarosław
19 July	Cycling Tour of Sibiu, Stage 2	UCI Europe Tour	Branislau Samoilau (BLR)	Romania	Păltiniș
20 July	Cycling Tour of Sibiu, Stage 3a	UCI Europe Tour	Team time trial (Note: The riders on the squad were Davide Rebellin, Adrian Honkisz, Nikolay Mihaylov, Łukasz Owsian, Maciej Paterski, Jacek Morajko and Branislau Samoilau)	Romania	Sibiu
29 July	Dookoła Mazowsza, Stage 1	UCI Europe Tour	Team time trial (Note: The riders on the squad were Piotr Gawroński, Nikolay Mihaylov, Tomasz Kiendyś, Adrian Kurek, Jarosław Marycz and Jacek Morajko.)	Poland	Nowy Dwór Mazowiecki
2 August	Dookoła Mazowsza, Overall	UCI Europe Tour	Jarosław Marycz (POL)	Poland	
9 August	Tour de Pologne, Mountains classification	UCI World Tour	Maciej Paterski (POL)	Poland	
16 August	Memoriał Henryka Łasaka	UCI Europe Tour	Maciej Paterski (POL)	Poland	Sucha Beskidzka
11 October	Giro dell'Emilia	UCI Europe Tour	Davide Rebellin (ITA)	Italy	San Luca
