= Marek Wesoły =

Marek Wesoły may refer to:

- Marek Wesoły (cyclist)
- Marek Wesoły (politician)
