= Dawid Krupa =

Polish cyclist

Personal information
- Born: 12 June 1980 (age 46) Rzeszów, Poland

Cycling career
- Sport: Cycling
- Discipline: Road
- Role: Rider

Professional teams
- 2001–2002: Ceresit–CCC–Mat
- 2003–2004: Legia
- 2005–2006: MBK Cycles-Scout
- 2007: Dynatek

Dawid Krupa (born 12 June 1980 in Rzeszów) is a Polish former cyclist.

== Palmares ==
1999
1st stage 3 Tour of Yugoslavia
2000
1st Paris-Mantes-en-Yvelines
2005
2nd Overall Szlakiem Walk Majora Hubala
3rd Overall Tour of China
3rd Overall Okolo Slovenska
2006
3rd Overall Tour of Greece

1st Stage 3

2007
3rd Overall Tour of Małopolska

1st Stage 3
