= Jarosław Zarębski =

Polish cyclist

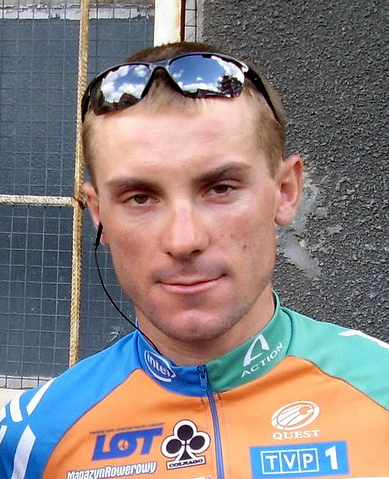

Personal information
- Born: 26 January 1979 (age 47) Wąbrzeźno, Poland

Cycling career
- Sport: Cycling
- Current team: Retired
- Discipline: Road
- Role: Rider

Professional teams
- 2002–2004: CCC–Polsat
- 2005–2007: Action–Ati
- 2008: Passage Cycling Team

Jarosław Zarębski (born 26 January 1979) is a Polish former road cyclist. He notably competed in the road race at the 2005 UCI Road World Championships and in the 2003 Giro di Lombardia.

== Major results ==
2002
3rd Road race, National Road Championships
2004
5th Puchar Uzdrowisk Karpackich
6th Overall Szlakiem Grodów Piastowskich

1st Stage 2

6th Overall Dookoła Mazowsza
10th Wachovia Classic
2005
1st Prologue Bałtyk–Karkonosze Tour
5th Overall Szlakiem Grodów Piastowskich

1st Points classification
1st Stage 4

5th Road race, National Road Championships
5th Puchar Ministra Obrony Narodowej
8th Grand Prix de Denain
10th Scheldeprijs
2006
9th Memoriał Andrzeja Trochanowskiego
2007
1st Stage 1 (ITT) Szlakiem Grodów Piastowskich
9th Memoriał Andrzeja Trochanowskiego
