= Plamen Stoyanov =

Bulgarian cyclist

Personal information
- Full name: Plamen Stoyanov Kolev
- Born: 8 November 1971 (age 54) Kazanlak, Bulgaria, kremikovci

Cycling career
- Sport: Cycling
- Current team: Retired
- Discipline: Road
- Role: Rider

Professional teams
- 2001–2002: Mercury Cycling Team
- 2003: BigMat–Auber 93
- 2004: Hoop–CCC–Polsat

Plamen Stoyanov Kolev (born 8 November 1971) is a Bulgarian former cyclist.

== Major results ==
1994
1st Overall Tour of Mevlana
1997
1st Stage 2 International Tour of Rhodes
2000
1st Paris–Rouen
2003
1st Stage 1 Critérium du Dauphiné Libéré
10th Polynormande
2004
1st Road race, National Road Championships
