= 2003 Critérium du Dauphiné Libéré =

Race details
- Dates: 8–15 June 2003
- Stages: 7 + Prologue
- Distance: 1,197.5 km (744.1 mi)
- Winning time: ~~29h 31' 53"~~

Results
	Winner	~~Lance Armstrong~~ (USA)	(~~U.S. Postal Service~~)
	Second	Iban Mayo (ESP)	(Euskaltel–Euskadi)
	Third	~~David Millar~~ (GBR)	(~~Cofidis~~)
Jersey awarded to the points classification winner	Points	Iban Mayo (ESP)	(Euskaltel–Euskadi)
Jersey awarded to the mountains classification winner	Mountains	Iban Mayo (ESP)	(Euskaltel–Euskadi)
	Combination	Iban Mayo (ESP)	(Euskaltel–Euskadi)
	Team	iBanesto.com	

The 2003 Critérium du Dauphiné Libéré was the 55th edition of the cycle race and was held from 8 June to 15 June 2003. The race started in Villard-de-Lans and finished in Grenoble. The race has no overall winner. Although Lance Armstrong originally won the event, he was stripped of the title due to violating anti-doping regulations. In 2012, the United States Anti-Doping Agency disqualified him from his results after 1 August 1998. The verdict was confirmed by the Union Cycliste Internationale.

== Teams ==
Fifteen teams, containing a total of 120 riders, participated in the race:

- U.S. Postal Service
- Crédit Agricole
- Team CSC
- Alessio
- Brioches La Boulangère
- Quick-Step–Davitamon
- Cofidis
- iBanesto.com
- FDJeux.com
- Rabobank
- AG2R Prévoyance
- Euskaltel–Euskadi
- Jean Delatour
- Phonak
- BigMat–Auber 93

== Route ==
Stage characteristics and winners
Stage	Date	Course	Distance	Type	Winner
P	8 June	Villard-de-Lans	5.1 km (3.2 mi)	Individual time trial	Iban Mayo (ESP)
1	9 June	Méaudre to Vaison-la-Romaine	198 km (123 mi)		Plamen Stoyanov (BUL)
2	10 June	Bollène to Vienne	195 km (121 mi)		Thor Hushovd (NOR)
3	11 June	Saint-Paul-en-Jarez to Saint-Héand	33.4 km (20.8 mi)	Individual time trial	~~Lance Armstrong (USA)~~ (Note: In 2012, Lance Armstrong was disqualified from his position in the race. He was stripped of all results after 1 August 1998, as a consequence of the Lance Armstrong doping case.)
4	12 June	Vienne to Morzine	237 km (147 mi)		Iban Mayo (ESP)
5	13 June	Morzine to Chambéry	192 km (119 mi)		Laurent Lefèvre (FRA)
6	14 June	Challes-les-Eaux to Briançon	153 km (95 mi)		Juan Miguel Mercado (ESP)
7	15 June	Briançon to Grenoble	174 km (108 mi)		Cédric Vasseur (FRA)

== General classification ==
Final general classification

Rank	Rider	Team	Time
~~DSQ~~	~~Lance Armstrong (USA)~~	~~U.S. Postal Service~~	~~29h 31' 53"~~
2	Iban Mayo (ESP)	Euskaltel–Euskadi	+ 1' 12"
~~DSQ~~	~~David Millar (GBR)~~	~~Cofidis~~	~~+ 2' 47"~~ (Note: David Millar, initially third, was disqualified by the UCI in 2004 for doping offences.)
4	Francisco Mancebo (ESP)	iBanesto.com	+ 4' 35"
5	Christophe Moreau (FRA)	Crédit Agricole	+ 4' 59"
6	Íñigo Chaurreau (ESP)	AG2R Prévoyance	+ 5' 53"
7	Juan Miguel Mercado (ESP)	iBanesto.com	+ 6' 03"
~~DSQ~~	~~Levi Leipheimer (USA)~~	~~Rabobank~~	~~+ 6' 25"~~ (Note: Levi Leipheimer, initially eighth, was disqualified by the UCI in 2012.)
9	Cyril Dessel (FRA)	Phonak	+ 7' 18"
10	Alberto López de Munain (ESP)	Euskaltel–Euskadi	+ 8' 07"
