= Sławomir Kohut =

Polish cyclist

Personal information
- Full name: Sławomir Kohut
- Born: 18 September 1977 (age 49) Cieszyn, Poland

Cycling career
- Sport: Cycling
- Current team: Retired
- Discipline: Road
- Role: Rider

Amateur team
- 2016: Dynamo Palmira Weltour Team

Professional teams
- 2001–2002: Amore & Vita–Beretta
- 2003–2004: CCC–Polsat
- 2005–2006: Miche
- 2007–2008: Amore & Vita–McDonald's
- 2010: Romet Weltour Debiça
- 2011: Miche–Guerciotti
- 2013: Las Vegas Power Energy Drink
- 2014: Wibatech Fuji Zory

Sławomir Kohut (born 18 September 1977, in Cieszyn) is a Polish former professional cyclist.

== Major results ==
2000
3rd Overall Tour of Bulgaria
2001
2nd Time trial, National Road Championships
3rd Firenze–Pistoia
2002
3rd Overall Course de la Solidarité Olympique
2003
2nd Overall Course de la Solidarité Olympique
3rd Time trial, National Road Championships
2004
1st Time trial, National Road Championships
1st Overall Bałtyk–Karkonosze Tour

1st Stage 5

1st Stage 4 Settimana Ciclistica Lombarda
2nd Overall Peace Race

1st Stage 6

2nd Overall Course de la Solidarité Olympique
2nd Tartu GP
2008
2nd Overall Tour du Maroc
