= Arkadiusz Wojtas =

Polish bicycle racer (born 1977)

Personal information
- Born: 29 October 1977 (age 48) Pszczółki, Pomeranian Voivodeship, Poland

Cycling career
- Sport: Cycling
- Current team: Retired
- Discipline: Road
- Role: Rider

Professional teams
- 1998–2000: Mróz
- 2001–2002: Nurnberger Versicherung
- 2003–2004: CCC–Polsat
- 2005: Skil–Moser
- 2006: Miche

Arkadiusz Wojtas (born 29 October 1977) is a Polish former cyclist.

== Major results ==
2000
1st Stage 2 Peace Race
1st Overall Ringerike GP

1st Stage 1

2002
3rd Overall Tour de Normandie

1st Stage 4

2004
1st Coupe des Carpathes
3rd Overall Tour de Normandie
