= Mateusz Mróz =

Polish cyclist

Personal information
- Born: 9 January 1980 (age 46) Gostyń, Poland

Cycling career
- Sport: Cycling
- Current team: Retired
- Discipline: Road
- Role: Rider

Professional teams
- 2001–2002: Mróz–Supradyn Witaminy
- 2003: Amore & Vita–Beretta
- 2006–2008: CCC–Polsat
- 2009: Mróz Continental Team
- 2010: DHL–Author

Mateusz Mróz (born 9 January 1980 in Gostyń) is a Polish former cyclist.

== Major results ==
2007
1st Coupe des Carpathes
1st Grand Prix de la ville de Nogent-sur-Oise
2008
1st Majowy Wyścig Klasyczny-Lublin
1st Stage 1 Szlakiem Grodów Piastowskich
1st Stage 7 Course de la Solidarité Olympique
2009
2nd Overall Bałtyk–Karkonosze Tour

1st Stage 7

3rd Overall Tour of Małopolska
