= Szymon Tracz =

Polish cyclist

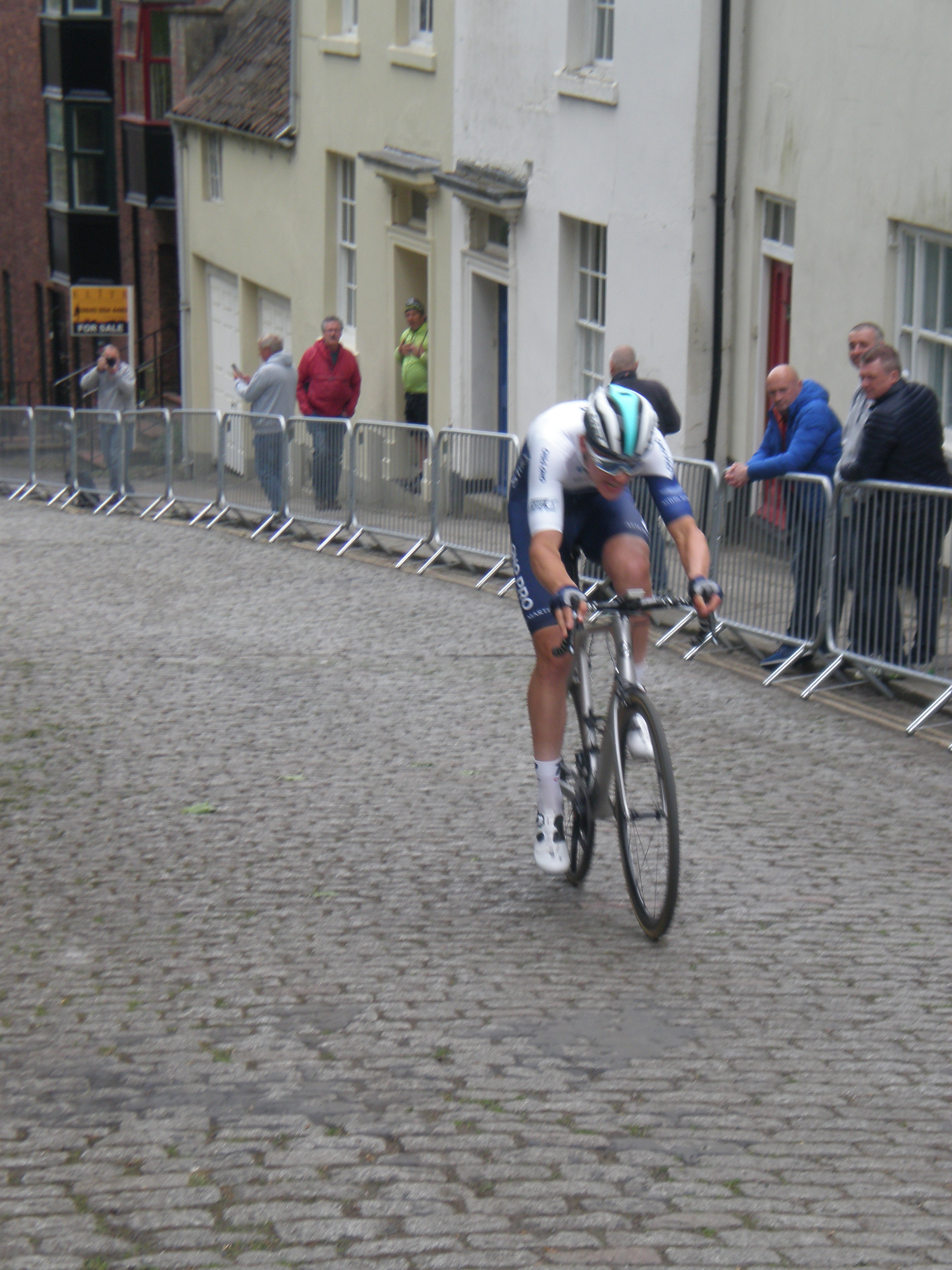
- Tracz in 2018

Personal information
- Full name: Szymon Tracz
- Born: 12 November 1998 (age 27) Skała, Poland
- Height: 1.89 m (6 ft 2 in)
- Weight: 74 kg (163 lb)

Cycling career
- Sport: Cycling
- Current team: Santic–Wibatech
- Discipline: Road
- Role: Rider

Amateur team
- 2017: Caja Rural–Seguros RGA Amateur

Professional teams
- 2017: Wibatech 7R Fuji
- 2018: ONE Pro Cycling
- 2019–2020: CCC Development Team
- 2021–2022: Nippo–Provence–PTS Conti
- 2023–: Santic–Wibatech

Szymon Tracz (born 12 November 1998) is a Polish road cyclist, who currently rides for UCI Continental team Santic–Wibatech.

== Major results ==
2016
2nd Road race, National Junior Road Championships
2017
1st Road race, National Under-23 Road Championships
2018
8th Overall Carpathian Couriers Race
2019
1st Stage 2a (ITT) Szlakiem Walk Majora Hubala
2020
6th Overall Giro della Friuli Venezia Giulia
2021
7th Grand Prix Alanya
2023
3rd Visegrad 4 Kerekparverseny
