= Paweł Charucki =

Polish cyclist

Personal information
- Full name: Paweł Charucki
- Born: 14 October 1988 (age 38) Wrocław, Poland
- Height: 1.78 m (5 ft 10 in)
- Weight: 64 kg (141 lb)

Cycling career
- Sport: Cycling
- Current team: Retired
- Discipline: Road
- Role: Rider

Amateur team
- 2010: MG–KVis–Norda Whistle

Professional teams
- 2008–2009: Legia–Felt
- 2011–2014: CCC–Polsat–Polkowice
- 2015: Domin Sport
- 2016: Verva ActiveJet
- 2017: Domin Sport

Paweł Charucki (born 14 October 1988) is a Polish former cyclist, who competed as a professional between 2008 and 2017.

== Major results ==
2008
4th Overall Szlakiem Walk Majora Hubala
2010
1st Road race, National Under-23 Road Championships
2016
3rd Memorial Grundmanna I Wizowskiego
3rd Korona Kocich Gór
2017
9th Visegrad 4 Kerekparverseny
