= Grzegorz Stępniak =

Polish cyclist

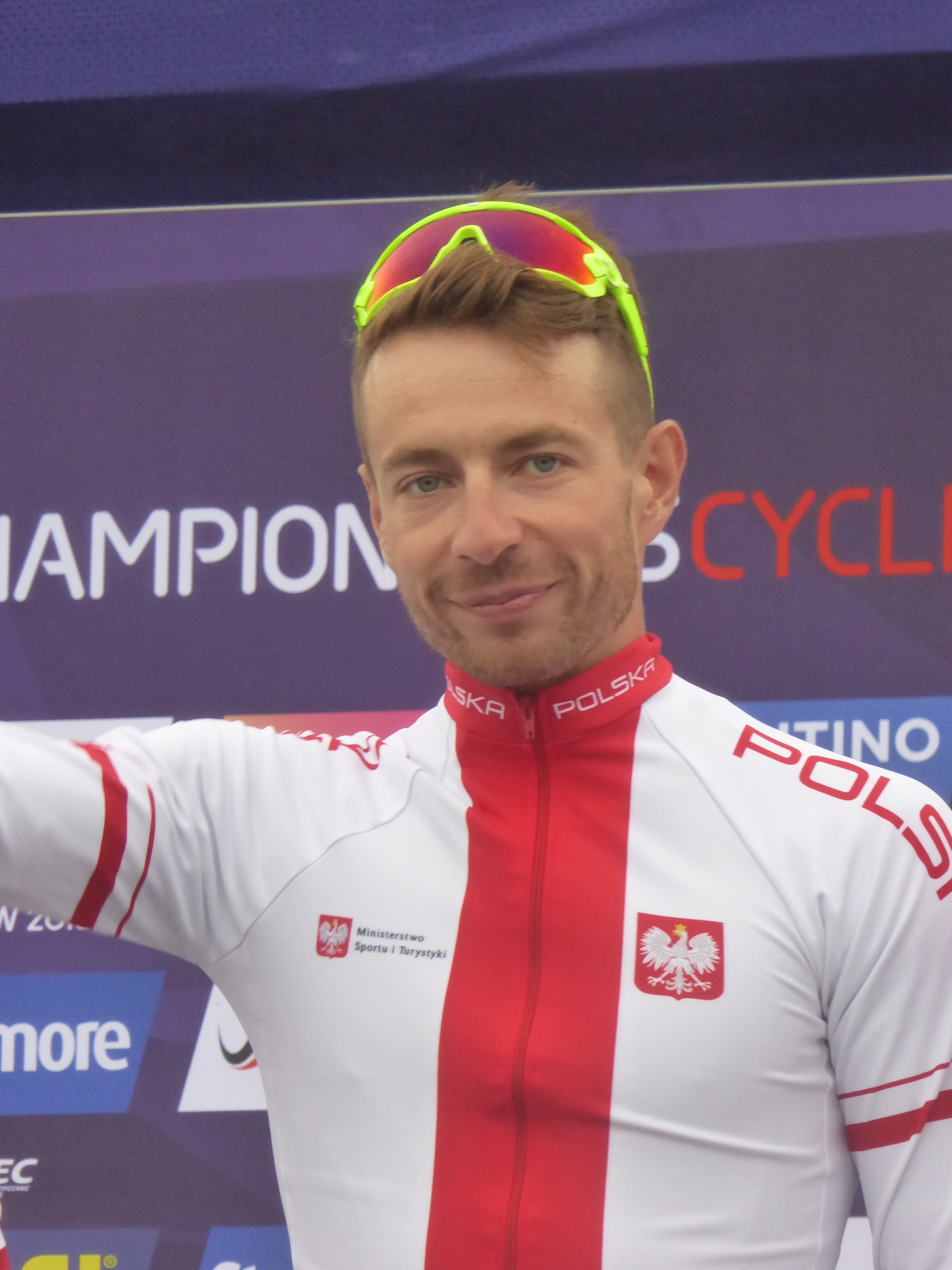
- Stępniak at the 2018 European Road Cycling Championships

Personal information
- Full name: Grzegorz Stępniak
- Born: 24 March 1989 (age 37) Goleniów, Poland
- Height: 1.76 m (5 ft 9 in)
- Weight: 73 kg (161 lb)

Cycling career
- Sport: Cycling
- Current team: Retired
- Discipline: Road
- Role: Rider
- Rider type: Sprinter

Amateur team
- 2009–2010: ALKS STAL Grudziądz

Professional teams
- 2012–2016: CCC–Polkowice
- 2017–2020: Wibatech 7R Fuji

Grzegorz Stępniak (born 24 March 1989) is a Polish former professional racing cyclist, who rode between 2012 and 2020 for the CCC–Sprandi–Polkowice and Wibatech Merx 7R teams. During his career, Stępniak took five professional victories including a joint-record two overall wins at the Tour of Estonia in 2016 and 2018.

== Career ==
In 2015 he finished 1st overall in the Dookoła Mazowsza. Stępniak announced in December 2019 that he would retire from the sport at the end of the season. However, he was named as part of the Wibatech Merx 7R team for the 2020 season.

In 2022, Stępniak was diagnosed with myasthenia.

== Major results ==
2012
Bałtyk–Karkonosze Tour

1st Stages 2 & 3

1st Stage 2 Dookoła Mazowsza
2013
Bałtyk–Karkonosze Tour

1st Stages 1, 2, 4 & 5

Dookoła Mazowsza

1st Stages 1 & 5

2nd Memoriał Andrzeja Trochanowskiego
2014
1st Stage 3 Course de la Solidarité Olympique
2nd Puchar Ministra Obrony Narodowej
2015
1st Overall Dookoła Mazowsza
1st Stage 2 Bałtyk–Karkonosze Tour
2nd Puchar Ministra Obrony Narodowej
3rd Velothon Stockholm
9th Overall Podlasie Tour
2016
1st Overall Tour of Estonia

1st Points classification
1st Stage 1

2017
1st Stage 1 Course de la Solidarité Olympique
1st Stage 4 Szlakiem Walk Majora Hubala
2nd Overall Dookoła Mazowsza
2nd Horizon Park Race Maidan
2nd Memoriał Andrzeja Trochanowskiego
4th Memoriał Romana Siemińskiego
2018
1st Overall Tour of Estonia
3rd Overall Dookoła Mazowsza
5th Road race, National Road Championships
5th Memoriał Romana Siemińskiego
10th Minsk Cup
2019
2nd Overall Szlakiem Walk Majora Hubala

1st Stage 1

2nd Overall Dookoła Mazowsza
5th Road race, National Road Championships
