= Łukasz Owsian =

Polish cyclist

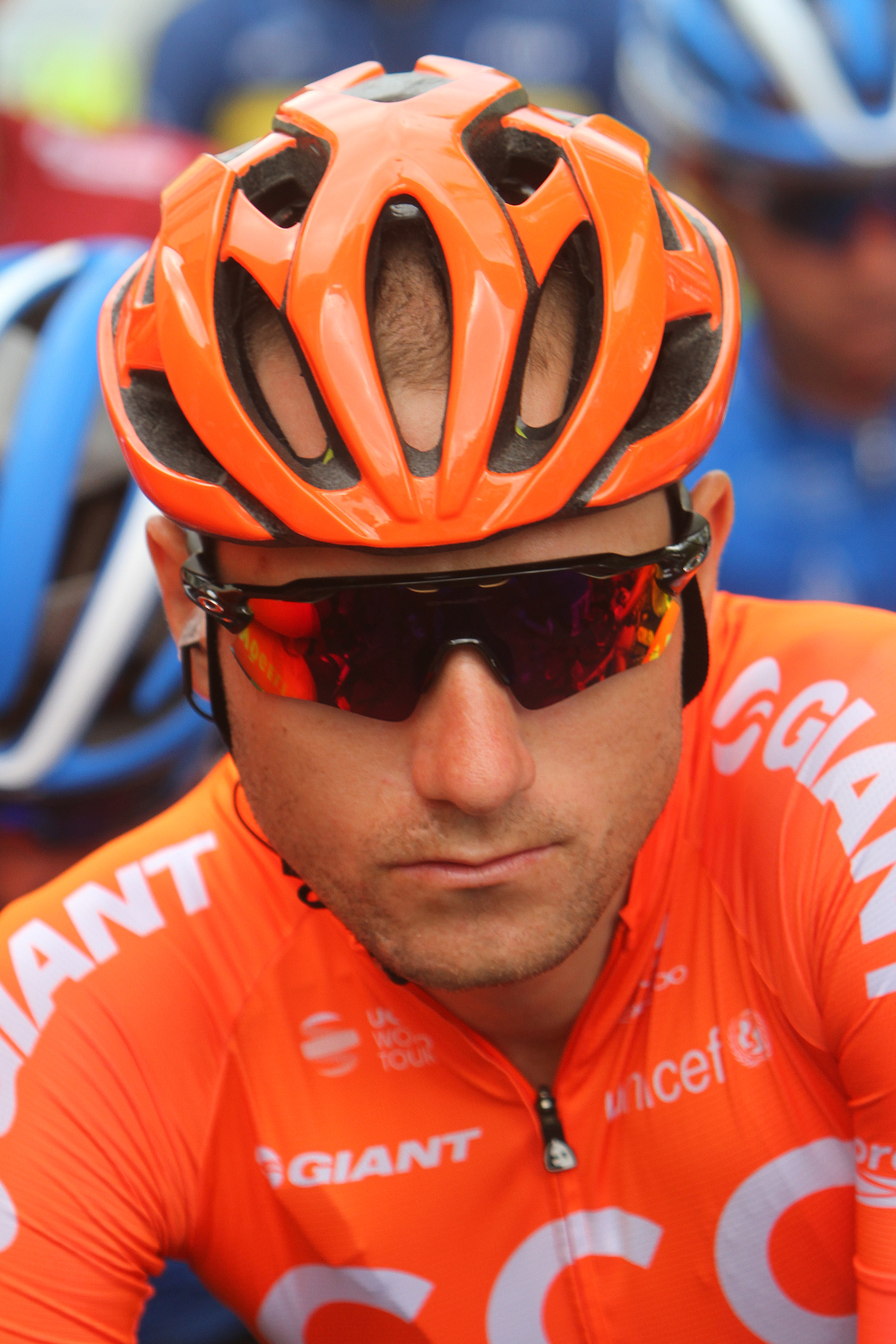
- Owsian in 2019

Personal information
- Full name: Łukasz Owsian
- Born: 24 February 1990 (age 36) Toruń, Poland
- Height: 1.8 m (5 ft 11 in)
- Weight: 66 kg (146 lb)

Cycling career
- Sport: Cycling
- Current team: Arkéa–B&B Hotels
- Discipline: Road
- Role: Rider

Amateur team
- 2008–2011: MG-KVis–Norda Whistle

Professional teams
- 2012–2018: CCC–Polkowice
- 2019: CCC Team
- 2020–2024: Arkéa–Samsic
- 2025–: Mazowsze Serce Polski

Łukasz Owsian (born 24 February 1990) is a Polish professional racing cyclist, who currently rides for UCI Continental Team Mazowsze Serce Polski. He was named in the start list for the 2017 Giro d'Italia.

== Major results ==
2008
1st Stage 4 Course de la Paix Juniors
2011
2nd Road race, National Under-23 Road Championships
2012
3rd Overall Carpathia Couriers Path
2013
2nd Overall Dookoła Mazowsza
4th Memoriał Henryka Łasaka
2014
1st Stage 3a (TTT) Sibiu Cycling Tour
1st Mountains classification, Szlakiem Grodów Piastowskich
2015
2nd Memorial Grundmanna I Wizowskiego
3rd Coupe des Carpathes
2016
1st GP Polski
2nd Korona Kocich Gór
7th Overall Szlakiem Grodów Piastowskich
7th Overall Tour of Małopolska
2017
1st Korona Kocich Gór
1st Mountains classification, Tour of Britain
5th Overall Tour of Małopolska
6th Overall Szlakiem Walk Majora Hubala
8th Overall Czech Cycling Tour
2018
1st Overall Szlakiem Grodów Piastowskich

1st Points classification
1st Stage 3

1st Memorial Grundmanna I Wizowskiego
2nd Overall Tour de Langkawi
3rd Road race, National Road Championships
10th Overall Okolo Slovenska
2021
1st Mountains classification, Tour de Pologne
3rd Road race, National Road Championships
2022
3rd Road race, National Road Championships
8th Trofeo Calvià

=== Grand Tour general classification results timeline ===
Grand Tour	2015	2016	2017	2018	2019	2020	2021	2022	2023	2024
Giro d'Italia	118	—	88	—	73	—	—	—	—	—
Tour de France	—	—	—	—	—	—	—	42	—	—
Vuelta a España	—	—	—	—	—	—	—	90	75	89

Legend
—	Did not compete
DNF	Did not finish
