= Krzysztof Jeżowski =

Polish cyclist

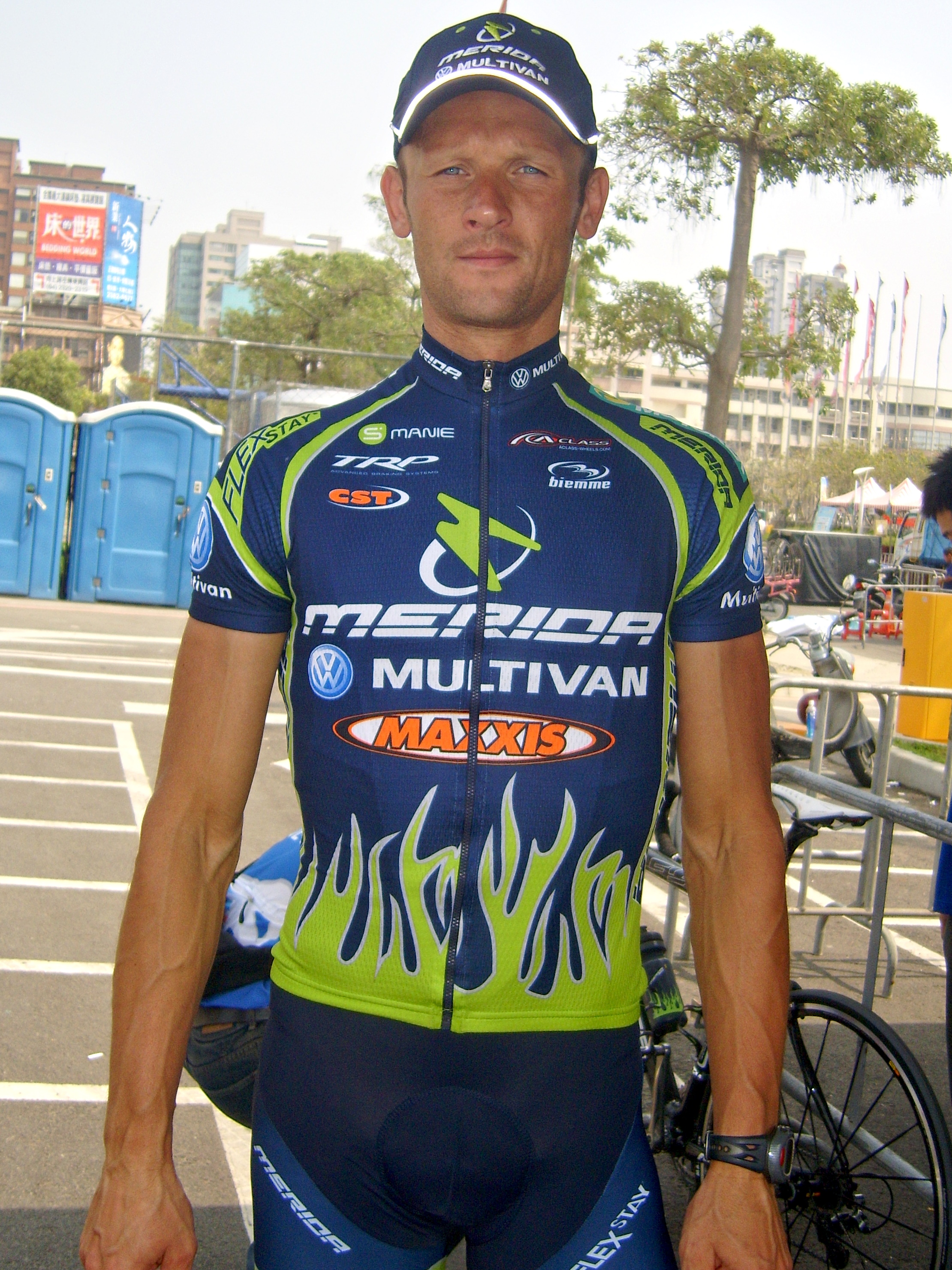

Personal information
- Born: 30 August 1975 (age 51) Poland

Cycling career
- Sport: Cycling
- Current team: Retired
- Discipline: Road
- Role: Rider

Professional teams
- 2000: Legia–Bazyliszek
- 2001–2003: Mikomax–Browar Staropolski
- 2004–2006: Knauf Team
- 2007–2010: CCC Polsat
- 2011–2012: Bank BGŻ

Krzysztof Jeżowski (born 30 August 1975) is a former Polish racing cyclist.

== Palmares ==
1998
1st Stages 6, 7 & 10 Tour of Greece
2001
1st Stage 5 Dookoła Mazowsza
3rd Memoriał Henryka Łasaka
2002
2nd National Road Race Championships
2004
1st Stage 11 Tour du Maroc
1st Stage 4 Course de la Solidarité Olympique
1st Stages 2 & 3 Tour of Małopolska
3rd National Road Race Championships
3rd Dookoła Mazowsza
2005
1st Stage 5 Dookoła Mazowsza
2006
1st Stages 3 & 4 Szlakiem Grodów Piastowskich
1st Pomerania Tour
1st Stages 1 & 4 Dookoła Mazowsza
2nd Neuseen Classics
2007
1st Memoriał Henryka Łasaka
1st Stage 3 Bałtyk–Karkonosze Tour
1st Stage 2 Tour of Małopolska
2008
1st Memoriał Henryka Łasaka
1st Stage 4 Tour de Taiwan
1st Stage 3 Szlakiem Grodów Piastowskich
1st Stage 2 Tour of Małopolska
2009
National Road Race Champion
1st Tour de Taiwan

1st Stages 3 & 6

1st Stages 1, 6, 9 & 10 Tour du Maroc
1st Stage 2 Tour of Małopolska
1st Stage 4 Dookoła Mazowsza
2nd Memoriał Henryka Łasaka
2010
3rd Memoriał Andrzeja Trochanowskiego
2011
2nd Memoriał Andrzeja Trochanowskiego
3rd Dookoła Mazowsza
