= Marek Rutkiewicz =

Polish racing cyclist

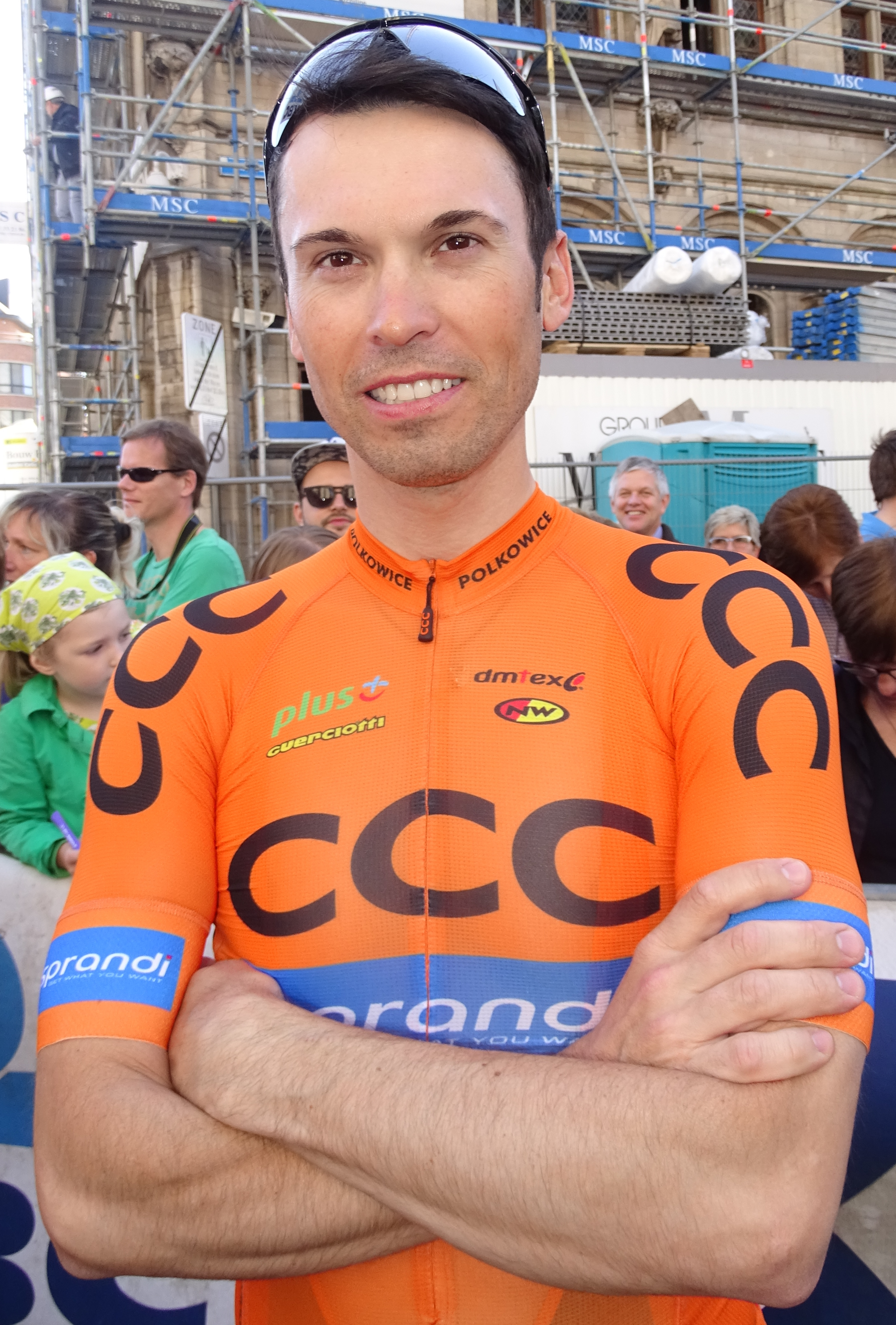
- Rutkiewicz at the 2015 Brabantse Pijl

Personal information
- Full name: Marek Rutkiewicz
- Born: 8 May 1981 (age 45) Olsztyn, Poland
- Height: 1.82 m (6 ft 0 in)
- Weight: 66 kg (146 lb)

Cycling career
- Sport: Cycling
- Current team: Mazowsze Serce Polski
- Discipline: Road
- Role: Rider (retired); Directeur sportif
- Rider type: Climbing specialist

Professional teams
- 2001–2003: Cofidis
- 2004: R.A.G.T. Semences–MG Rover
- 2004–2008: Action
- 2009: DHL–Author
- 2010: Mróz–Active Jet
- 2011–2015: CCC–Polsat–Polkowice
- 2016–2019: Wibatech–Fuji
- 2020: Mazowsze Serce Polski

Managerial team
- 2021–: Mazowsze Serce Polski

Marek Rutkiewicz (born 8 May 1981) is a Polish former road racing cyclist, who rode professionally between 2001 and 2020 for seven different teams. Rutkiewicz's strength was in climbing and his victories came in hilly races, including the mountains classification at the 2009 Tour de Pologne. He now works as a directeur sportif for UCI Continental team Mazowsze Serce Polski.

== Personal life ==
Rutkiewicz is married to fellow cyclist Anna Szafraniec.

== Major results ==
2002
1st Stage 4 Tour de l'Ain
3rd Overall Tour de Pologne
2003
2nd Grand Prix de Wallonie
5th Overall Tour de Pologne
7th Overall Tour de l'Ain
8th Japan Cup
2004
2nd Coupe des Carpathes
4th Overall Tour de Pologne

1st Stage 6

2005
3rd Pomorski Klasyk
5th Overall Sachsen Tour
6th Overall Tour of Małopolska
8th Overall Tour de Pologne
2006
1st Overall Tour of Małopolska

1st Stage 2

4th Overall Tour de Pologne
5th Grote Prijs Stad Zottegem
2007
10th Overall Danmark Rundt
2008
1st Stage 3 Tour of Małopolska
2nd Overall Tour of Qinghai Lake

1st Stage 5

4th Coupe des Carpathes
6th Overall Course de Solidarność et des Champions Olympiques

1st Mountains classification

10th Overall Tour de Pologne
2009
6th Overall Tour de Pologne

1st Mountains classification

2010
1st National Hill Climb Championships
1st Overall Szlakiem Grodów Piastowskich

1st Stage 1

1st Coupe des Carpathes
3rd Memoriał Henryka Łasaka
7th Overall Tour de Pologne
2011
2nd Overall Szlakiem Grodów Piastowskich

1st Stage 4

2nd Overall Tour of Małopolska

1st Stage 2

2nd Coupe des Carpathes
9th Overall Giro di Padania
10th Overall Tour de Pologne
2012
1st Overall Circuit des Ardennes
1st Overall Szlakiem Grodów Piastowskich

1st Points classification
1st Stage 2 (ITT)

1st Overall Tour of Małopolska

1st Points classification
1st Stage 3

4th Puchar Ministra Obrony Narodowej
6th Coupe des Carpathes
7th Memoriał Henryka Łasaka
2013
4th Overall Szlakiem Grodów Piastowskich
2014
2nd Overall Szlakiem Grodów Piastowskich

1st Points classification

6th Memoriał Henryka Łasaka
2015
9th Overall Tour of Croatia
2016
1st Visegrad 4 Bicycle Race – GP Czech Republic
2nd Road race, National Road Championships
2nd Memoriał Romana Siemińskiego
2nd Visegrad 4 Bicycle Race – GP Poland
2nd Race Horizon Park Classic
4th Overall Tour of Małopolska

1st Mountains classification
1st Stage 3

5th Horizon Park Race for Peace
6th Overall Szlakiem Grodów Piastowskich
2017
1st Overall Szlakiem Grodów Piastowskich

1st Points classification
1st Stage 2

1st Overall Bałtyk–Karkonosze Tour
2nd Road race, National Road Championships
3rd Coupe des Carpathes
4th Overall Tour of Małopolska
5th Overall Szlakiem Walk Majora Hubala

1st Mountains classification

5th Visegrad 4 Bicycle Race – GP Slovakia
7th Memoriał Andrzeja Trochanowskiego
9th Puchar Ministra Obrony Narodowej
2018
2nd Grand Prix Doliny Baryczy Milicz
2nd Grand Prix Minsk
3rd Memorial Grundmanna I Wizowskiego
6th Overall Course de Solidarność et des Champions Olympiques
9th Overall Tour of Małopolska
9th Visegrad 4 Bicycle Race – GP Slovakia
2019
4th Overall Szlakiem Grodów Piastowskich

1st Mountains classification

4th Memorial Grundmanna I Wizowskiego
2020
5th Overall Belgrade–Banja Luka
