= Adrian Kurek =

Polish road racing cyclist

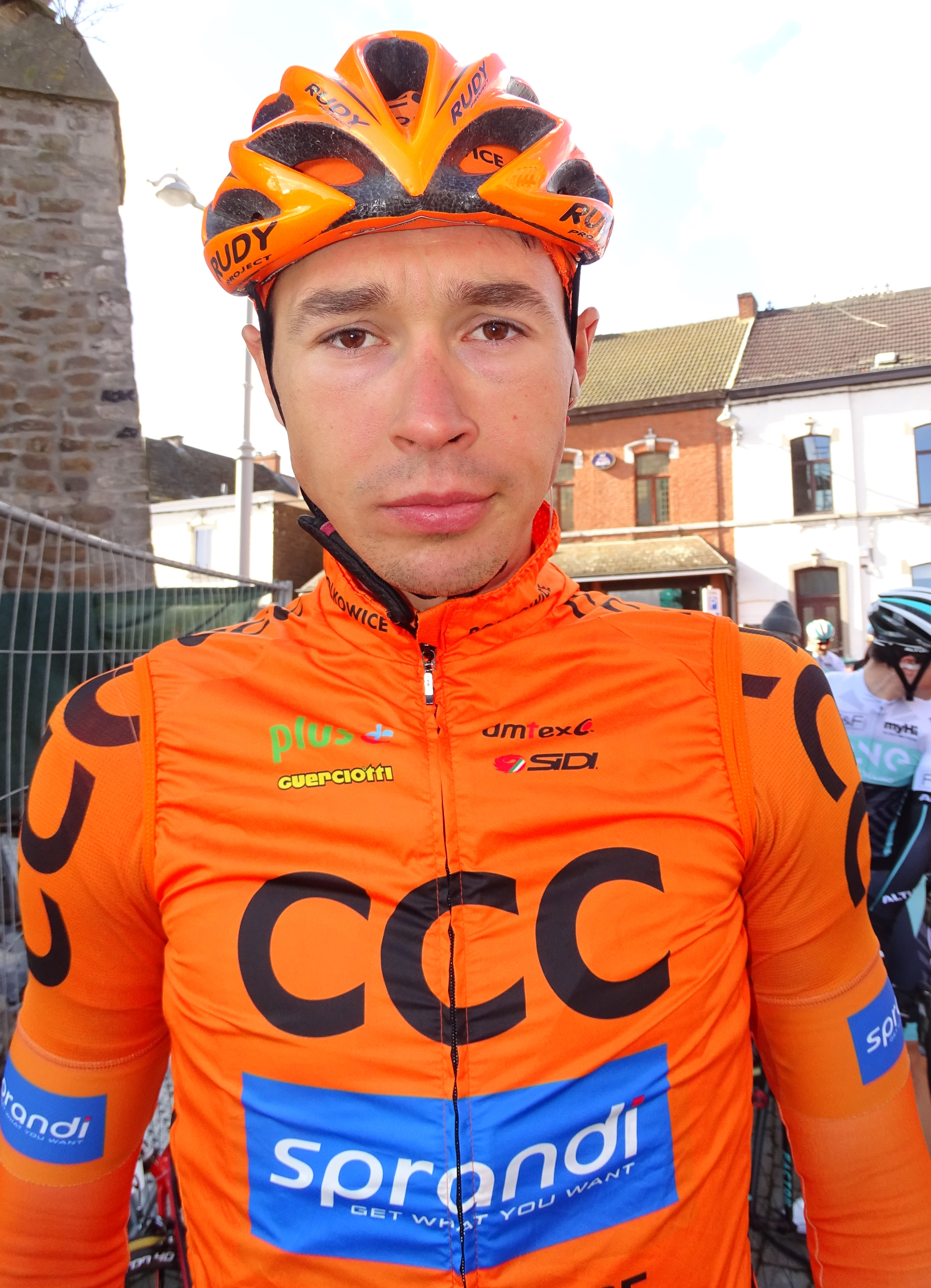
- Kurek in 2016

Personal information
- Full name: Adrian Kurek
- Born: 21 March 1988 (age 38) Grudziądz, Poland

Cycling career
- Sport: Cycling
- Current team: Retired
- Disciplines: Road; Track
- Role: Rider

Amateur teams
- 2008: Top 16 Cyclisme
- 2009: Mosaic-Diffusion.com
- 2010: Albi Velo Sport
- 2011: Océane Cycle Poitevin

Professional teams
- 2012: Utensilnord–Named
- 2013–2018: CCC–Polsat–Polkowice
- 2019–2021: Hurom BDC Development

Major wins
- One-day races and Classics National Road Race Championships (2017)
Medal record
Men's road cycling
Representing Poland
World University Cycling Championship
Bronze medal – third place	2014 Jelenia Góra	Time trial

Adrian Kurek (born 29 March 1988) is a Polish former professional road bicycle racer, who rode professionally between 2012 and 2021 for the Utensilnord–Named, CCC–Sprandi–Polkowice and HRE Mazowsze Serce Polski teams. Following his retirement, Kurek now coaches the Kuwaiti national cycling team.

He competed at UCI World Tour level on several occasions at his home race, the Tour de Pologne. In the 2011 edition of the race, Kurek won the intermediate sprints classification, having led it from start-to-finish; he also held a top-three place overall in the first three stages. In the 2012 race, Kurek took the lead of the classification after four stages of the event, and held the lead until the end.

== Major results ==
2008
2nd Overall Tour des Deux Sèvres
2009
1st Route de l'Atlantique
2nd Time trial, National Under-23 Road Championships
2nd Vienne Classic Espoirs
3rd Team pursuit, UEC European Under-23 Track Championships
2011
1st Trophée des Champions
1st Stage 2 (ITT) Saint Brieuc Agglo-Tour
1st Stage 3 Tour de Gironde
1st Stage 4 Trois Jours de Cherbourg
1st Sprints classification Tour de Pologne
2nd Chrono de Tauxigny
3rd Chrono Châtelleraudais
4th Overall Tour of Małopolska
4th Prix Gérard Gautier à Vendeuvre-du-Poitou
8th Overall Tour de la Dordogne
8th Circuit Boussaquin
9th Grand Prix des Fêtes de Cénac et St-Julien
10th Circuit des Vins du Blayais
2012
1st Sprints classification Tour de Pologne
5th Overall Tour of Małopolska
2013
7th Overall Dookoła Mazowsza
2014
2nd Overall Tour of Estonia

1st Stage 2

3rd Time trial, World University Road Championships
8th Overall Dookoła Mazowsza

1st Stage 1 (TTT)

2015
1st Stage 1b (TTT) Settimana Internazionale di Coppi e Bartali
1st Stage 3 Tour of Małopolska
8th Overall Podlasie Tour

1st Prologue

2017
1st Road race, National Road Championships
1st Stage 1b (TTT) Settimana Internazionale di Coppi e Bartali
9th Overall Course de Solidarność et des Champions Olympiques
2018
1st Stage 3a (TTT) Sibiu Cycling Tour
8th Overall Dookoła Mazowsza
8th Overall Tour de Hongrie
2019
5th Overall Szlakiem Walk Majora Hubala
9th Overall Tour of Estonia
9th Memoriał Romana Siemińskiego
2020
1st Prologue Tour of Szeklerland
7th International Rhodes Grand Prix
