= Marek Wesoły (cyclist) =

Polish cyclist

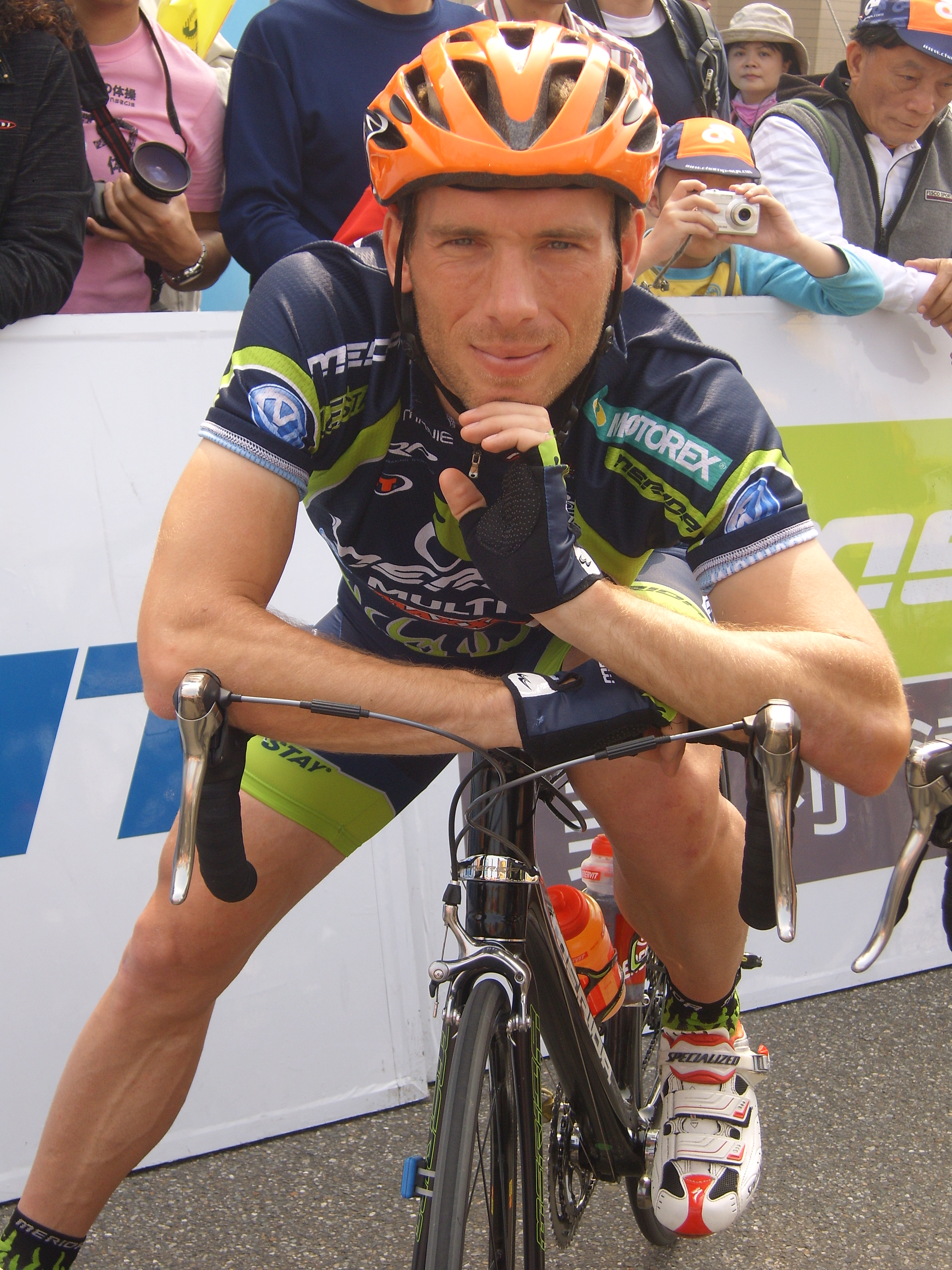

Personal information
- Full name: Marek Wesoły
- Born: January 4, 1978 (age 48) Gostyń, Poland

Cycling career
- Sport: Cycling
- Discipline: Road
- Role: Rider

Professional teams
- 2001: Amore & Vita–Beretta
- 2003–2004: Amore & Vita–Beretta
- 2005: Team Skil–Moser
- 2006–2007: CCC–Polsat

Marek Wesoły (born 4 January 1978) is a Polish former professional road cyclist. He became a professional rider in 2001. In 2006, he became a member of the Polish UCI Continental cycling team, CCC Polsat, now CCC Polsat Polkowice. Wesoły has also been a member of Amore e Vita-Beretta (Italy) (2001, 2003–2004), and Team Skil-Moser (Netherlands) (2005). In 2003, Wesoły rode in the Herald Sun Tour (Australia) for Pelaco (a local sponsor).

== Major results ==
2003
1st Stage 6 Course de la Solidarité Olympique
2004
1st Road race, National Road Championships
2006
2nd Overall Dookoła Mazowsza

1st Stage 3

5th Road race, National Road Championships
7th Overall Course de la Solidarité Olympique

1st Points classification

2007
1st Overall Dookoła Mazowsza

1st Stages 1, 2b & 4

1st Stage 4a Bałtyk–Karkonosze Tour
4th GP Palma
6th Memoriał Andrzeja Trochanowskiego
2008
1st Stages 3 & 5 Course de la Solidarité Olympique
1st Stage 1 Bałtyk–Karkonosze Tour
1st Stages 2 & 8 Tour de Taiwan
7th Overall Dookoła Mazowsza

1st Points classification
1st Stage 3
