= Grand Prix Doliny Baryczy Milicz =

Race details
- Date: June
- Region: Barycz Valley
- Discipline: Road
- Competition: UCI Europe Tour
- Type: One day race

History
- First edition: 2016
- Editions: 3 (as of 2018)
- First winner: Vojtěch Hačecký (CZE)
- Most wins: No repeat winners
- Most recent: Kamil Małecki (POL)

The International Race Grand Prix Doliny Baryczy Milicz is a one-day cycling race held annually in Poland. It was first held in 2016 and has been part of the UCI Europe Tour in category 1.2 since 2018.

== Winners ==
Year	Country	Rider	Team
2016	Czech Republic	Vojtěch Hačecký	Whirlpool–Author
2017	Poland	Alan Banaszek	CCC–Sprandi–Polkowice
2018	Poland	Kamil Małecki	CCC–Sprandi–Polkowice
