= Mateusz Taciak =

Polish cyclist (born 1984)

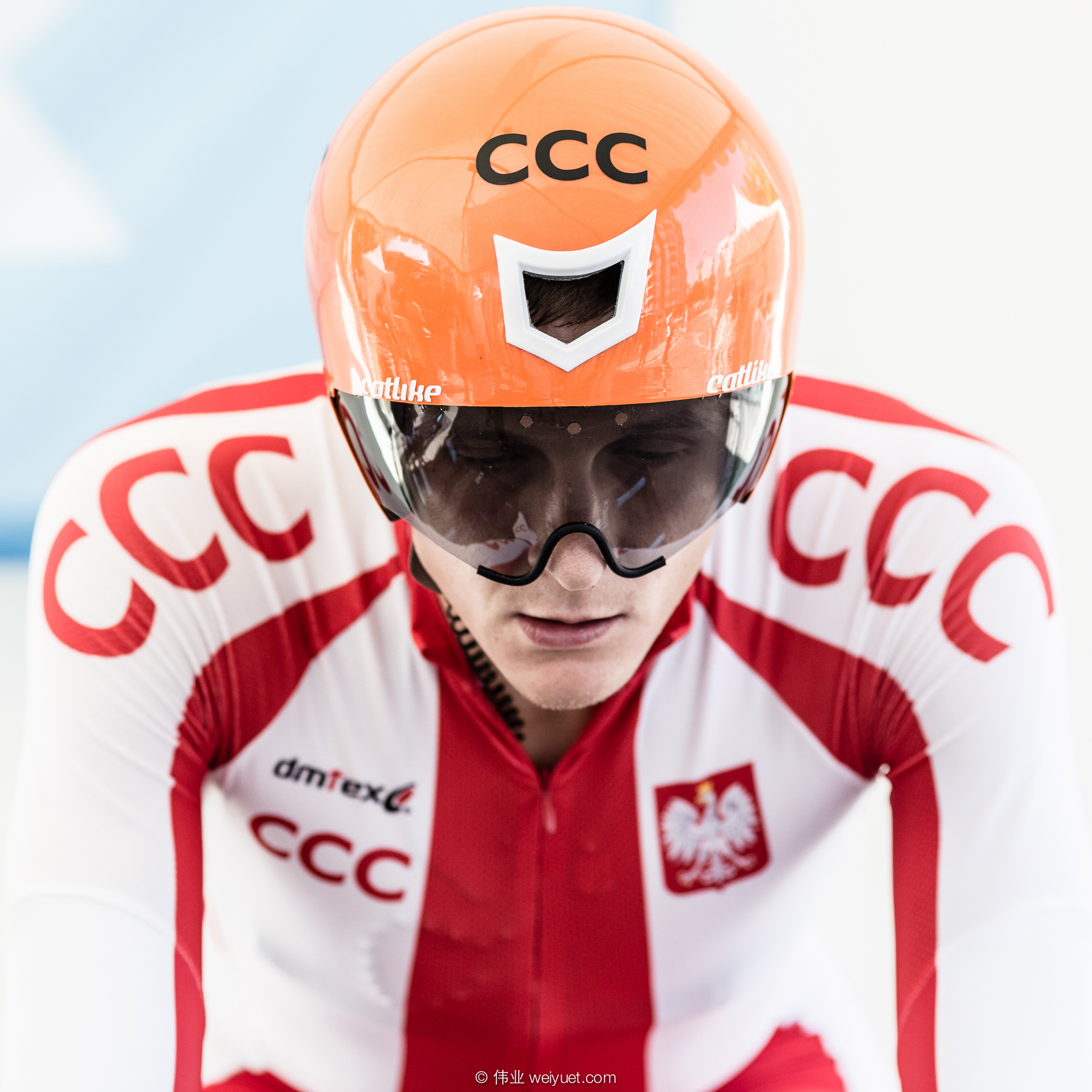
- Taciak during the 2014 UCI Road World Championships

Personal information
- Full name: Mateusz Taciak
- Born: 19 June 1984 (age 42) Kórnik, Poland
- Height: 1.78 m (5 ft 10 in)
- Weight: 68 kg (150 lb)

Cycling career
- Sport: Cycling
- Current team: Voster Team
- Discipline: Road
- Role: Rider (retired); Directeur sportif

Amateur team
- 2006–2008: CC Étupes

Professional teams
- 2009–2010: Mróz Continental Team
- 2011–2018: CCC–Polsat–Polkowice
- 2019–2020: Voster ATS Team

Managerial team
- 2021–: Voster ATS Team

Mateusz Taciak (born 19 June 1984) is a Polish former racing cyclist, who rode professionally from 2009 to 2020, for the Mróz–Active Jet, CCC–Sprandi–Polkowice and Voster ATS Team squads, and rode at the 2014 UCI Road World Championships. He now works as a directeur sportif for UCI Continental team Voster Team.

== Major results ==
2004
2nd Memorial Oleg Dyachenko
8th Paris–Tours Espoirs
2005
2nd Time trial, National Under-23 Road Championships
2006
2nd Time trial, National Under-23 Road Championships
2007
2nd Chrono Champenois
3rd Time trial, National Road Championships
5th Overall Tour Alsace

1st Stage 3

2008
3rd Time trial, National Road Championships
5th Overall Tour Alsace
2009
1st Memoriał Andrzeja Trochanowskiego
3rd Time trial, National Road Championships
3rd Overall Bałtyk–Karkonosze Tour

1st Stage 1

3rd Puchar Ministra Obrony Narodowej
10th Overall Szlakiem Grodów Piastowskich
2010
2nd Puchar Ministra Obrony Narodowej
3rd Overall Tour of Małopolska
2011
3rd Overall Tour of Qinghai Lake

1st Stage 2

9th Duo Normand (with Łukasz Bodnar)
2012
1st Overall Dookoła Mazowsza
3rd Overall Szlakiem Grodów Piastowskich
2013
1st Mountains classification Tour of Hainan
3rd Time trial, National Road Championships
3rd Overall Szlakiem Grodów Piastowskich
9th Coupe des Carpathes
2014
1st Overall Szlakiem Grodów Piastowskich
3rd Time trial, National Road Championships
2015
2nd Overall Szlakiem Grodów Piastowskich
2nd Overall Bałtyk–Karkonosze Tour

1st Stage 5 (ITT)

2016
1st Overall Bałtyk–Karkonosze Tour

1st Stage 5 (ITT)

1st Overall Tour of Małopolska
3rd Time trial, National Road Championships
2018
1st Overall Szlakiem Walk Majora Hubala
1st Stage 3a (TTT) Sibiu Cycling Tour
2nd Overall Bałtyk–Karkonosze Tour

1st Stages 4 (ITT) & 5

8th Overall Szlakiem Grodów Piastowskich
2019
3rd Road race, National Road Championships
