= Kamil Małecki =

Polish cyclist

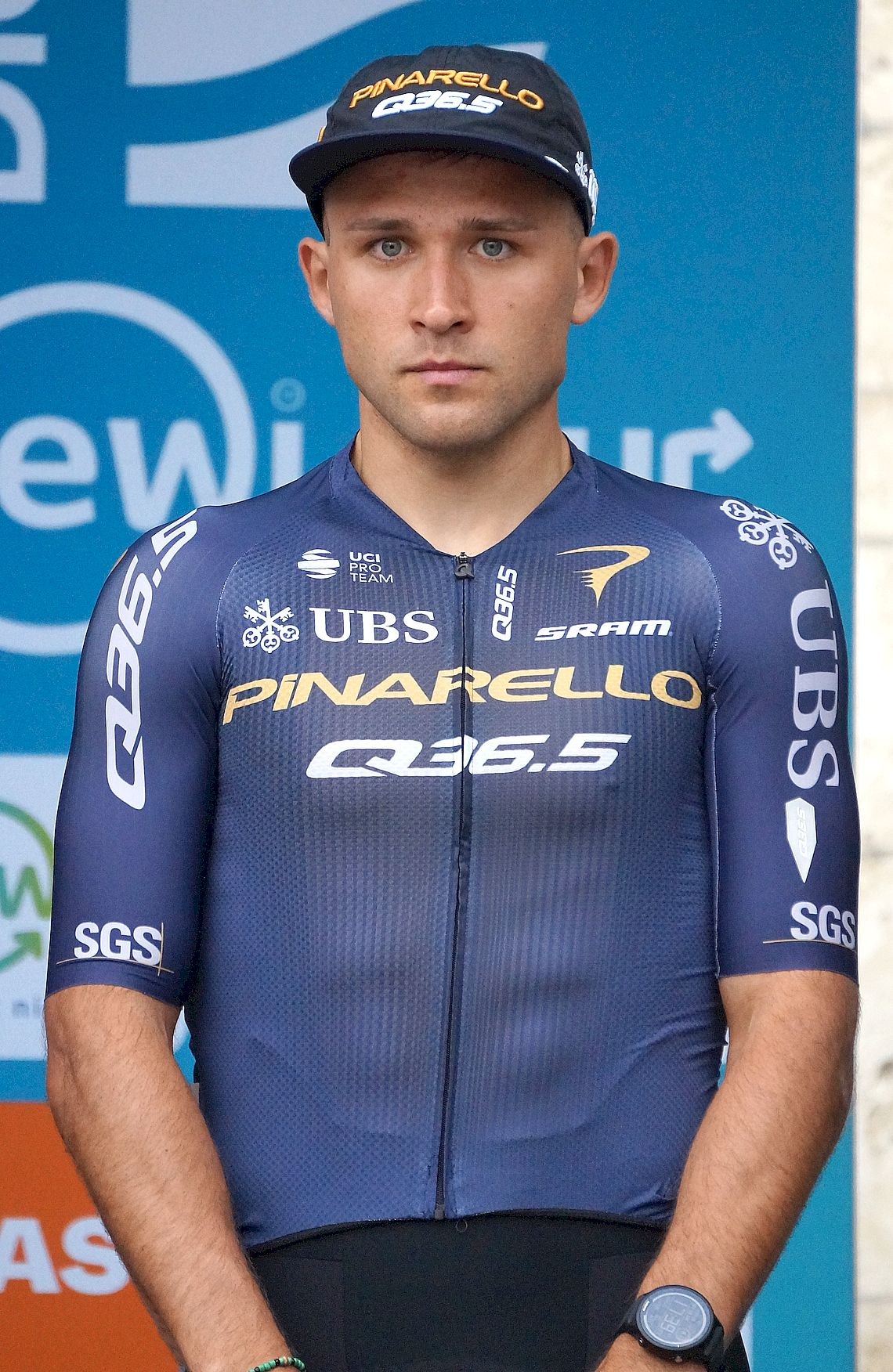
- Małecki in 2026

Personal information
- Full name: Kamil Małecki
- Born: 2 January 1996 (age 30) Bytów, Poland
- Height: 1.74 m (5 ft 9 in)
- Weight: 69 kg (152 lb)

Cycling career
- Sport: Cycling
- Current team: Pinarello–Q36.5 Pro Cycling Team
- Discipline: Road
- Role: Rider

Professional teams
- 2015–2019: CCC–Sprandi–Polkowice
- 2020: CCC Team
- 2021–2022: Lotto–Soudal
- 2023–: Q36.5 Pro Cycling Team

Kamil Małecki (born 2 January 1996) is a Polish professional racing cyclist, who currently rides for UCI ProTeam Pinarello–Q36.5 Pro Cycling Team. In October 2020, he was named in the startlist for the 2020 Giro d'Italia.

== Major results ==
2017
2nd Overall Carpathian Couriers Race

1st Stage 2

6th Overall Dookoła Mazowsza
2018
1st Grand Prix Doliny Baryczy Milicz
8th Trofeo Matteotti
2019
1st Overall CCC Tour - Grody Piastowskie

1st Stage 1b

1st Overall Bałtyk–Karkonosze Tour

1st Stage 4 (ITT)

4th Memoriał Andrzeja Trochanowskiego
5th Grand Prix Gazipasa
5th Memoriał Romana Siemińskiego
5th Grand Prix Poland, Visegrad 4 Bicycle Race
2020
6th Overall Tour de Pologne
2025
2nd Time trial, National Road Championships

=== Grand Tour general classification results timeline ===
Grand Tour	2020	2021	2022
Giro d'Italia	68	—	—
Tour de France	—	—	—
Vuelta a España	—	—	125

Legend
—	Did not compete
DNF	Did not finish
