= Josef Černý (cyclist) =

Czech cyclist

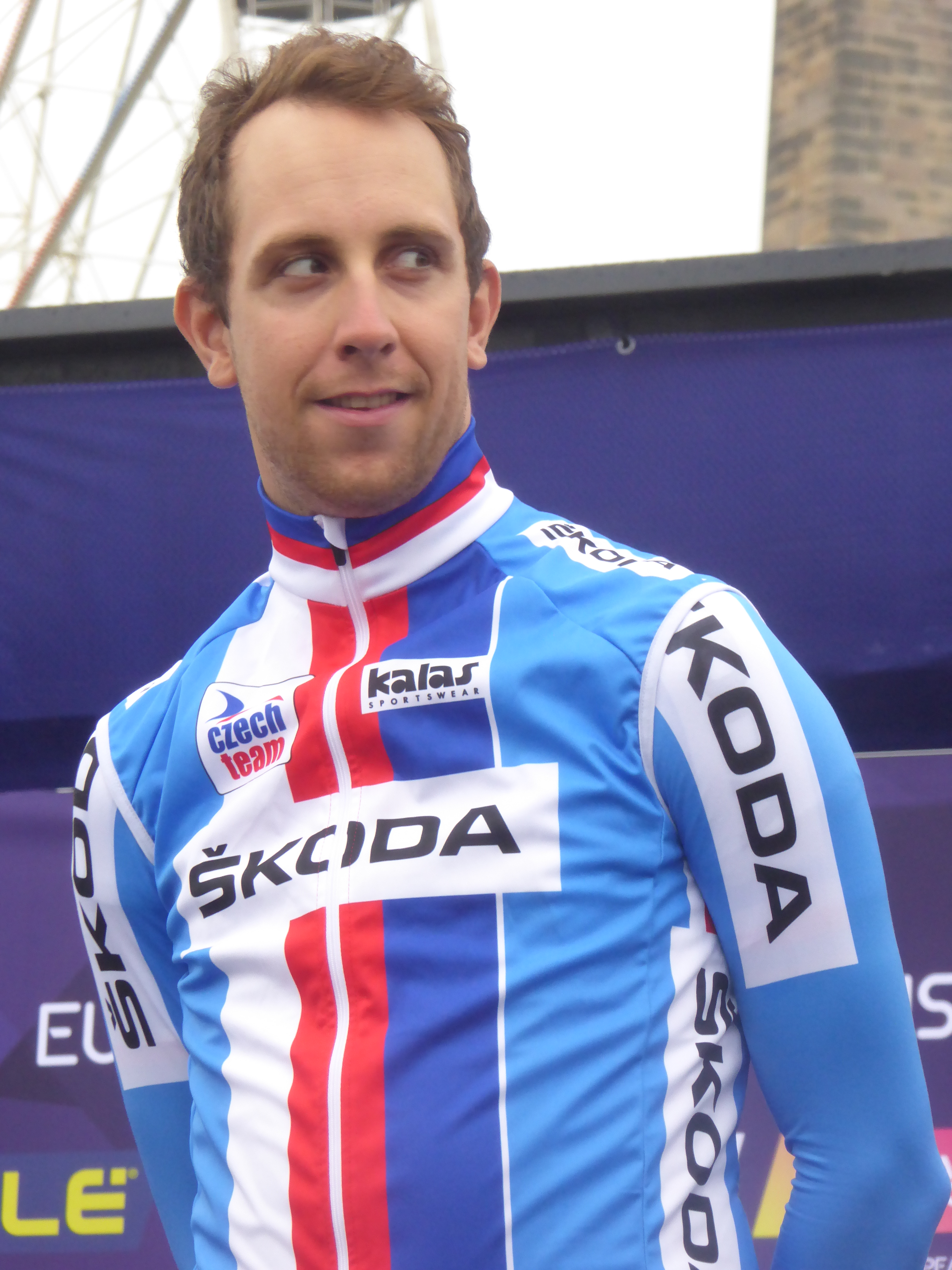
- Černý at the 2018 European Road Cycling Championships

Personal information
- Full name: Josef Černý
- Born: 11 May 1993 (age 33) Frýdek-Místek, Czech Republic
- Height: 1.88 m (6 ft 2 in)
- Weight: 75 kg (165 lb)

Cycling career
- Sport: Cycling
- Current team: Soudal–Quick-Step
- Discipline: Road
- Role: Rider

Professional teams
- 2013–2016: CCC–Polsat–Polkowice
- 2017–2018: Elkov–Author
- 2019–2020: CCC Team
- 2021–: Deceuninck–Quick-Step

Major wins
- Grand Tours Giro d'Italia 1 individual stage (2020) Single-day races and Classics National Road Race Championships (2018) National Time Trial Championships (2018, 2020, 2021)

Josef Černý (born 11 May 1993) is a Czech professional racing cyclist, who rides for UCI WorldTeam Soudal–Quick-Step.

He has taken eleven victories during his professional career, including stage nineteen of the 2020 Giro d'Italia, and four national titles – three wins in the Czech National Time Trial Championships (2018, 2020 and 2021), and the 2020 Czech National Road Race Championships.

== Major results ==
2011
9th Trofeo Emilio Paganessi
2012
1st Mountains classification, Carpathian Couriers Race
6th Overall Dookoła Mazowsza
10th Overall Tour of Małopolska
2013
1st Time trial, National Under-23 Road Championships
1st Young rider classification, Dookoła Mazowsza
5th Memoriał Henryka Łasaka
2014
1st GP Czech Republic
2015
1st Time trial, National Under-23 Road Championships
5th Time trial, National Road Championships
2016
5th Time trial, National Road Championships
2017 (2 pro wins)
1st Overall Czech Cycling Tour

1st Stages 1 (TTT) & 3

1st Overall Okolo Jižních Čech

1st Points classification

National Road Championships

2nd Road race
3rd Time trial

2nd Kerékpárverseny
3rd GP Czech Republic
3rd Szlakiem Wielkich Jezior
5th GP Polski
7th Overall Course de la Solidarité Olympique
8th Memoriał Romana Siemińskiego
10th Overall Okolo Slovenska
2018 (2)
National Road Championships

1st Road race
1st Time trial

2nd Overall À travers les Hauts-de-France
2nd Overall Szlakiem Grodów Piastowskich
3rd Overall Tour du Loir-et-Cher
3rd Overall Ronde de l'Oise
5th Overall Okolo Slovenska
5th Overall Szlakiem Walk Majora Hubala
5th Overall Okolo Jižních Čech

1st Stage 4

7th Overall Tour of Slovenia
8th GP Slovakia
10th Overall Dookoła Mazowsza
2019
2nd Time trial, National Road Championships
2020 (3)
1st Time trial, National Road Championships
1st Stage 19 Giro d'Italia
2nd Overall Tour Poitou-Charentes en Nouvelle-Aquitaine

1st Stage 3b (ITT)

2nd Overall Vuelta a Murcia
2021 (1)
1st Time trial, National Road Championships
4th Münsterland Giro
2022 (1)
1st Overall Okolo Slovenska
1st Stage 5 Settimana Internazionale di Coppi e Bartali
2023 (1)
1st Prologue Tour de Romandie
1st Stage 2 (TTT) UAE Tour
2024
2nd Time trial, National Road Championships
2025
2nd Time trial, National Road Championships

=== Grand Tour general classification results timeline ===
Grand Tour	2019	2020	2021	2022	2023	2024
Giro d'Italia	115	86	—	—	DNF	141
Tour de France	—	—	—	—	—	—
Vuelta a España	—	—	142	—	—	—
