= CCC Development Team =

Polish cycling team

Team information
- UCI code: MAT (2000); CCC (2001–2005, 2009–2018); SPL (2006–2008); CDT (2019–present)
- Registered: Poland
- Founded: 2000
- Discipline: Road
- Status: Groupe Sportif II (2000–2003); Groupe Sportif III (2004–2005); UCI Continental (2006–2009, 2012, 2019–present); UCI Professional Continental (2010–2011, 2013–2018)
- Bicycles: Giant
- Website: Team home page

Key personnel
- General manager: Marek Leśniewski

Team name history
- 2000 2001 2002–2003 2004 2006 2007–2011 2012 2013–2014 2015–2018 2019–: Mat–Ceresit–CCC; CCC–Mat–Ceresit; CCC–Polsat; Hoop–CCC–Polsat; CCC–Polsat; CCC–Polsat–Polkowice; CCC–Polkowice; CCC–Polsat–Polkowice; CCC–Sprandi–Polkowice; CCC Development Team
CCC Development Team jersey
Jersey

CCC Development Team (UCI team code: CDT) is a UCI Continental cycling team based in Poland. Formerly CCC-Mat, the team became known as CCC-Polsat in 2002. In 2004 and 2005, the team was known as Hoop CCC-Polsat (UCI team code: HOP), reverting to CCC-Polsat in 2006. From 2007 to 2011, the team was known as CCC-Polsat-Polkowice (abbreviated to CCC-Polsat), and team kit colours are orange and black.

== History ==
=== 2002 ===
In UCI rankings as of 13 November 2002, CCC Polsat was placed in division 2, in 5th place. The team comprised Cezary Zamana, Artur Krzeszowiec, Jarosław Rębiewski, Radosław Romanik, Krzysztof Szafrański, Quintino Rodrigues (Portugal), Andrei Tietieruk (Kazakhstan), Piotr Przydział, Ondřej Sosenka (Czech Republic), Dawid Krupa, Tomasz Kłoczko, Jarosław Zarębski, Dariusz Skoczylas, Felice Puttini (Switzerland), Serhiy Ushakov (Russia), and Jacek Mickiewicz. In 2002, Ondřej Sosenka won the Czech Championship (25 June 2002), the Course de la Paix (Peace Race) (10–18 May 2002), and the ASY Fiata AutoPoland (25–28 September 2002).

=== 2003 ===
In 2003, team member, Ondřej Sosenka, won the Okolo Slovenska (27–31 August 2003) (overall win and stages 4 and 5).

In this year, CCC-Polsat was the first Polish team to ride a Grand Tour, the Giro d'Italia. The 2003 team was headed by Pavel Tonkov, who finished in 5th place in the same race in the previous year for Lampre–Daikin. The Giro team also included Piotr Chmielewski, Seweryn Kohut, Piotr Przydział, Radosław Romanik, Dariusz Baranowski, Tomasz Brożyna, Andris Naudužs, and Bogdan Bondariew. CCC Polsat's team manager was Andrzej Sypythowski. The colours of the team kit at this time were orange, yellow, and red, with black lettering.

=== 2004 ===
In 2004, the team was in division 3, and won 14 victories and 184 UCI-Points. The team included Sławomir Kohut, Piotr Przydział, Alexei Markov, Radosław Romanik, Plamen Stoyanov, Arkadiusz Wojtas, and Jarosław Zarebski.

=== 2005 ===
In 2005, the team was in division 3. Paweł Osuch was team manager. Riders included Alexei Markov, Jacek Mickiewicz, Łukasz Bodnar, Jarosław Zarebski, Piotr Przydział, Radosław Romanik, Arkadiusz Wojtas, Alexei Sivakov (Russia), Seweryn Kohut, Slawomir Kohut, Marek Galinski, Jonathan Page (USA), and Mariusz Kowal.

=== 2006 ===
Piotr Wadecki, Adam Wadecki, and Marek Wesoły rode for CCC Polsat in 2006.

=== 2007 ===
The 2007 team includes Adrian Brzózka, Piotr Brzózka, Adrian Faltyn, Marek Galiński, Adam Grzeziółkowski, Krzysztof Jeżowski, Tomasz Kiendyś, Tomasz Lisowicz, Mateusz Mróz, Mariusz Olesek, Jarosław Rębiewski, Paweł Szaniawski, Marek Wesoły, Daniel Zywer, Tomasz Zywer, and Grzegorz Żołędziowski. Sports director is Marek Leśniewski, technical director is Jacek Bodyk, and team manager is Zbigniew Misztal.

=== 2018 ===
In July 2018 the team announced they would merge with BMC Racing Team for the 2019 season.

== Team roster ==
As of 16 March 2020.

| Rider | Date of birth |
|---|---|
| Stanisław Aniołkowski (POL) | 20 January 1997 (age 29) |
| Michał Gałka (POL) | 19 April 2001 (age 25) |
| Dominik Gorak (POL) | 12 October 2001 (age 24) |
| Michał Jaskot (POL) | 26 May 2001 (age 25) |
| Petr Kelemen (CZE) | 18 November 2000 (age 25) |
| Szymon Krawczyk (POL) | 8 August 1998 (age 28) |

| Rider | Date of birth |
|---|---|
| Savva Novikov (RUS) | 27 July 1999 (age 27) |
| Damian Papierski (POL) | 26 January 2000 (age 26) |
| Piotr Pekala (POL) | 4 August 1998 (age 28) |
| Szymon Tracz (POL) | 12 November 1998 (age 27) |
| Kacper Walkowiak (POL) | 5 January 2000 (age 26) |
| Karol Wawrzyniak (POL) | 19 April 2000 (age 26) |

== Major wins ==
2000
Stage 9 Course de la Paix, Dainis Ozols
Stage 5 Course de la Solidarité Olympique, Dimitri Sedun
Stage 1 Bałtyk–Karkonosze Tour, Piotr Zaradny
Stage 5a Bałtyk–Karkonosze Tour, Radosław Romanik
Stage 4 Dookoła Mazowsza, Piotr Zaradny
Overall Tour de Pologne, Piotr Przydział

2001
Stage 3 Szlakiem Grodów Piastowskich, Ondřej Sosenka
GP Weltour, Piotr Przydział
Lubelski Wyścig 3-Majowy, Piotr Przydział
Stage 1 FBD Milk Ras, David McCann
Overall Bałtyk–Karkonosze Tour, Piotr Przydział

Stage 5, Radosław Romanik

Czech Republic Time Trial Championships, Ondřej Sosenka
Poland Road Race Championships, Radosław Romanik
Poland Time Trial Championships, Piotr Przydział
Ireland Road Race Championships, David McCann
Ireland Time Trial Championships, David McCann
Overall Course de la Solidarité Olympique, Ondřej Sosenka

Stage 4b, Ondřej Sosenka

Overall Bohemia Tour, Ondřej Sosenka

Stages 1, 3 & 4, Ondřej Sosenka

Overall Tour de Pologne, Ondřej Sosenka

Stage 7b, Ondřej Sosenka

Overall Course 4 Asy Fiata Autopoland, Ondřej Sosenka

Stage 2a, Ondřej Sosenka

2002
Stage 4 GP Mosqueteiros, Andrey Teteryuk
Stage 3 Vuelta del Uruguay, Jarosław Zarębski
Stage 2 Settimana Ciclistica Lombarda, Andrey Teteryuk
Overall Szlakiem Grodów Piastowskich, Krzysztof Szafrański

Stages 1 & 2b, Jacek Mickiewicz

Overall Course de la Paix, Ondřej Sosenka

Stages 4 & 9, Ondřej Sosenka
Stage 6b, Jacek Mickiewicz

Stage 2 Euskal Bizikleta, Serguei Outschakov
GP Ostrowca Świętokrzyskiego, Jacek Mickiewicz
Czech Republic Time Trial Championships, Ondřej Sosenka
Poland Time Trial Championships, Krzysztof Szafrański
Overall Course de la Solidarité Olympique, Radosław Romanik

Stages 2 & 4, Jacek Mickiewicz
Stage 5a, Ondřej Sosenka

Stage 2 Bohemia Tour, Ondřej Sosenka
Overall Dookoła Mazowsza, Jacek Mickiewicz

Stages 1 & 5, Jacek Mickiewicz
Stage 3, Tomasz Kłoczko

Szlakiem Walk Majora Hubala, Radosław Romanik
Memoriał Henryka Łasaka, Cezary Zamana
Stage 6 Tour de Pologne, Cezary Zamana
Stage 7b Tour de Pologne, Ondřej Sosenka
Overall Course 4 Asy Fiata Autopoland, Ondřej Sosenka

Stage 2b, Jarosław Zarębski
Stage 3, Cezary Zamana

2003
Stage 2a Szlakiem Grodów Piastowskich, Bogdan Bondariev
Stage 4 Course de la Paix, Ondřej Sosenka
Poland Road Race Championships, Piotr Przydział
Latvia Road Race Championships, Andris Naudužs
Stage 2 Course de la Solidarité Olympique, Tomasz Brożyna
Stage 2 Bohemia Tour, Seweryn Kohut
Stage 3 Dookoła Mazowsza, Andris Naudužs
Stage 4 Dookoła Mazowsza, Piotr Chmielewski
Stage 5 Dookoła Mazowsza, Bogdan Bondariev
Stage 3 Tour of Małopolska, Piotr Chmielewski
Stage 4 Tour of Małopolska, Radosław Romanik
Overall Okolo Slovenska, Ondřej Sosenka

Stages 4 & 5, Ondřej Sosenka

2004
Stages 2 & 7 Tour de Normandie, Alexei Markov
Stage 4 Settimana Ciclistica Lombarda, Sławomir Kohut
Overall Szlakiem Grodów Piastowskich, Piotr Przydział

Stage 2, Jarosław Zarębski
Stage 4, Piotr Przydział

Miedzynarodowy 3-Majowy Wyścig, Piotr Przydział
Stage 6 Course de la Paix, Sławomir Kohut
Overall Bałtyk–Karkonosze Tour, Sławomir Kohut

Stage 5, Sławomir Kohut

Stage 4 Tour de Beauce, Radosław Romanik
Poland Time Trial Championships, Sławomir Kohut
Bulgaria Road Race Championships, Plamen Stoyanov
Puchar Uzdrowisk Karpackich, Arkadiusz Wojtas

2006
Memoriał Andrzeja Trochanowskiego, Piotr Chmielewski
Stage 4 Bałtyk–Karkonosze Tour, Paweł Szaniawski
Stage 3 Dookoła Mazowsza, Marek Wesoły

2007
Grand Prix de la ville de Nogent-sur-Oise, Mateusz Mróz
Memoriał Andrzeja Trochanowskiego, Tomasz Lisowicz
Overall Szlakiem Grodów Piastowskich, Tomasz Kiendyś

Stages 1 & 2, Tomasz Kiendyś

Prologue Flèche du Sud, Tomasz Kiendyś
Stagee 3 Flèche du Sud, Grzegorz Żołędziowski
Stage 3 Bałtyk–Karkonosze Tour, Krzysztof Jeżowski
Stage 4 Bałtyk–Karkonosze Tour, Marek Wesoły
Overall Dookoła Mazowsza, Marek Wesoły

Stages 3 & 5, Marek Wesoły

Stage 2 Tour of Małopolska, Krzysztof Jeżowski
Puchar Uzdrowisk Karpackich, Mateusz Mróz
Memoriał Henryka Łasaka, Krzysztof Jeżowski
Overall Szlakiem Walk Majora Hubala, Tomasz Kiendyś

Stage 2, Krzysztof Jeżowski

2008
Stages 2 & 8 Tour de Taiwan, Marek Wesoły
Stage 4 Tour de Taiwan, Krzysztof Jeżowski
Memoriał Andrzeja Trochanowskiego, Tomasz Kiendyś
3-Majowy Wyścig, Mateusz Mróz
Stage 3 Szlakiem Grodów Piastowskich, Krzysztof Jeżowski
Stage 4 Szlakiem Grodów Piastowskich, Tomasz Kiendyś
GP Jasna Góra-Częstochowa, Tomasz Kiendyś
Stage 1 Bałtyk–Karkonosze Tour, Marek Wesoły
Stage 7 Bałtyk–Karkonosze Tour, Jarosław Rębiewski
Stages 3 & 5 Course de la Solidarité Olympique, Marek Wesoły
Stage 7 Course de la Solidarité Olympique, Mateusz Mróz
Stage 3 Dookoła Mazowsza, Marek Wesoły
Stage 6 Dookoła Mazowsza, Tomasz Kiendyś
Stage 2 Tour of Małopolska, Krzysztof Jeżowski
Stage 4 Tour of Małopolska, Jarosław Rębiewski
Memoriał Henryka Łasaka, Krzysztof Jeżowski
Overall Szlakiem Walk Majora Hubala, Tomasz Kiendyś

Stage 2, Tomasz Kiendyś
Stage 3, Krzysztof Jeżowski

2009
Overall Tour de Taiwan, Krzysztof Jeżowski

Stages 3 & 6, Krzysztof Jeżowski
Stage 7, Tomasz Kiendyś

Stages 1, 6, 9 & 10 Tour du Maroc, Krzysztof Jeżowski
Stage 2 Tour du Maroc, Adrian Honkisz
Stage 5 Tour du Maroc, Tomasz Kiendyś
Stage 8 Tour du Maroc, Łukasz Bodnar
Stage 3 Szlakiem Grodów Piastowskich, Tomasz Smoleń
Stage 2 Tour of Małopolska, Krzysztof Jeżowski
Stage 3 Tour of Małopolska, Tomasz Smoleń
Poland Road Race Championships, Krzysztof Jeżowski
Stage 6 Course de la Solidarité Olympique, Bartłomiej Matysiak
Overall Dookoła Mazowsza, Łukasz Bodnar

Stage 3, Łukasz Bodnar
Stage 4, Krzysztof Jeżowski

Puchar Ministra Obrony Narodowej, Tomasz Kiendyś

2010
Stage 6 Tour de Taiwan, Tomasz Smoleń
Stage 2 Szlakiem Grodów Piastowskich, Tomasz Marczyński
Stage 3 Szlakiem Grodów Piastowskich, Łukasz Bodnar
Overall Coupe des Carpathes, Adrian Honkisz

Stage 3 & 4, Adrian Honkisz

Stage 2 Tour of Małopolska, Adam Sznitko
Stage 3 Tour of Małopolska, Tomasz Smoleń
Puchar Ministra Obrony Narodowej, Bartłomiej Matysiak
Overall Szlakiem Walk Majora Hubala, Tomasz Kiendyś

Stage 1, Tomasz Kiendyś
Stage 2, Adrian Honkisz

Overall Tour de Seoul, Tomasz Marczyński

Stage 1, Tomasz Marczyński

2011
Memoriał Andrzeja Trochanowskiego, André Schulze
Stage 4 Szlakiem Grodów Piastowskich, Marek Rutkiewicz
Neuseen Classics, André Schulze
Overall Tour of Małopolska, Tomasz Marczyński
Stage 2, Marek Rutkiewicz
Poland Road Race Championships, Tomasz Marczyński
Poland Time Trial Championships, Tomasz Marczyński
Stage 2 Course de la Solidarité Olympique, André Schulze
Stage 2 Tour of Qinghai Lake, Mateusz Taciak
Prologue Dookoła Mazowsza, André Schulze
Coupe des Carpathes, Jacek Morajko
Puchar Ministra Obrony Narodowej, Tomasz Kiendyś

2012
Bulgaria Time Trial Championships, Nikolay Mihaylov
Overall Circuit des Ardennes, Marek Rutkiewicz
Overall Szlakiem Grodów Piastowskich, Marek Rutkiewicz

Stage 2 (ITT), Marek Rutkiewicz

Overall Tour of Małopolska, Marek Rutkiewicz

Stage 3, Marek Rutkiewicz

Stage 4 Course de la Solidarité Olympique, Adrian Honkisz
Overall Dookoła Mazowsza, Mateusz Taciak

Stage 2, Grzegorz Stępniak

Memoriał Henryka Łasaka, Sylwester Janiszewski
Coupe des Carpathes, Sylwester Janiszewski

2013
Stages 1 & 4 Szlakiem Grodów Piastowskich, Davide Rebellin
Stage 3 Tour of Estonia, Bartłomiej Matysiak
Czech Republic Under-23 Time Trial Championships, Josef Černý
Overall Sibiu Cycling Tour, Davide Rebellin

Stage 1, Davide Rebellin

Stages 1 & 5 Dookoła Mazowsza, Grzegorz Stępniak
Coupe des Carpathes, Adrian Honkisz
Puchar Ministra Obrony Narodowej, Bartłomiej Matysiak

2014
Overall Szlakiem Grodów Piastowskich, Mateusz Taciak
Visegrad 4 Bicycle Race – GP Czech Republic, Josef Černý
Overall Tour of Norway, Maciej Paterski
Stage 2 Tour of Estonia, Adrian Kurek
Stage 1 Tour of Małopolska, Bartłomiej Matysiak
Stage 1 Memorial Grundmanna I Wizowskiego, Bartłomiej Matysiak
Poland Road Race Championships, Bartłomiej Matysiak
Bulgaria Road Race Championships, Nikolay Mihaylov
Stage 3 Course de la Solidarité Olympique, Grzegorz Stępniak
Stage 5 Course de la Solidarité Olympique, Jacek Morajko
Stage 2 Cycling Tour of Sibiu, Branislau Samoilau
Stage 3a Cycling Tour of Sibiu, Team time trial
Overall Dookoła Mazowsza, Jarosław Marycz

Stage 1, Team time trial

Memoriał Henryka Łasaka, Maciej Paterski
Giro dell'Emilia, Davide Rebellin

2015
Stage 1 Volta a Catalunya, Maciej Paterski
Stage 1b Settimana Internazionale di Coppi e Bartali, Team time trial
Overall Tour of Croatia, Maciej Paterski

Stage 1, Grega Bole
Stages 3 & 5, Maciej Paterski

Stage 3 Tour of Turkey, Davide Rebellin
Overall Bałtyk–Karkonosze Tour, Leszek Pluciński

Stage 2, Grzegorz Stępniak
Stage 5 (ITT), Mateusz Taciak

Stage 3 Tour of Małopolska, Adrian Kurek
Czech Republic U23 Time Trial Championships, Josef Černý
Poland U23 Road Race Championships, Michał Paluta
Bulgaria Road Race Championships, Nikolay Mihaylov
Bulgaria Time Trial Championships, Nikolay Mihaylov
Prologue Podlasie Tour, Adrian Kurek
Overall Dookoła Mazowsza, Grzegorz Stępniak
Coppa Ugo Agostoni, Davide Rebellin

2016
Stage 1 Carpathian Couriers Race, Alan Banaszek
Stage 2 Carpathian Couriers Race, Michał Paluta
Visegrad 4 Bicycle Race – GP Poland, Łukasz Owsian
Overall Bałtyk–Karkonosze Tour, Mateusz Taciak

Stage 5 (ITT), Mateusz Taciak
Stage 6, Maciej Paterski

Overall Tour of Estonia, Grzegorz Stępniak

Stage 1, Grzegorz Stępniak

Poland U23 Time Trial Championships, Patryk Stosz
Overall Tour of Małopolska, Mateusz Taciak
Overall Tour of Austria, Jan Hirt

Stage 4, Jan Hirt

Stage 2 Sibiu Cycling Tour, Nikolay Mihaylov

2017
Czech Republic Track Championships (Points race), František Sisr
International Rhodes Grand Prix, Alan Banaszek
Stage 1b Settimana Internazionale di Coppi e Bartali, Team time trial
Stage 2 Carpathian Couriers Race U-23, Kamil Małecki
Stage 3 CCC Tour – Grody Piastowskie, Alan Banaszek
Overall Szlakiem Walk Majora Hubala, Maciej Paterski

Stage 1, Maciej Paterski

Overall Okolo Slovenska, Jan Tratnik

Prologue, Jan Tratnik

Overall Tour of Małopolska, Maciej Paterski

Stages 2 & 3, Maciej Paterski

Grand Prix Doliny Baryczy Milicz, Alan Banaszek
Poland U23 Time Trial Championships, Piotr Brożyna
Poland Road Race Championships, Adrian Kurek
Stage 2 Course de Solidarność et des Champions Olympiques, Alan Banaszek
Coupe des Carpathes, Maciej Paterski

2018
Ronde van Drenthe, František Sisr
Stage 4 (ITT) Settimana Internazionale di Coppi e Bartali, Jan Tratnik
Volta Limburg Classic, Jan Tratnik
Overall CCC Tour – Grody Piastowskie, Łukasz Owsian

Stage 1 (ITT), Jan Tratnik
Stage 3, Łukasz Owsian

Visegrad 4 Kerékpárverseny, František Sisr
Stage 4 (ITT) Bałtyk–Karkonosze Tour, Mateusz Taciak
Overall Szlakiem Walk Majora Hubala, Mateusz Taciak
Slovenia Time Trial Championships, Jan Tratnik
Overall Tour of Małopolska, Amaro Antunes

Stage 3, Amaro Antunes

Grand Prix Doliny Baryczy Zmigrod, Łukasz Owsian
Grand Prix Doliny Baryczy Milicz, Kamil Małecki
Stage 3a Sibiu Cycling Tour, Team time trial
Overall Dookoła Mazowsza, Szymon Sajnok

Prologue, Stages 1 & 2, Szymon Sajnok

2019
Stage 1 Istrian Spring Trophy, Attila Valter
Stages 3 & 5 Carpathian Couriers Race, Stanisław Aniołkowski
Overall CCC Tour – Grody Piastowskie, Kamil Małecki

Stage 1b, Kamil Małecki

Overall Bałtyk–Karkonosze Tour, Kamil Małecki

Stage 4 (ITT), Kamil Małecki

Stage 2a (ITT) Szlakiem Walk Majora Hubala, Szymon Tracz
Korona Kocich Gór, Patryk Stosz
Stage 4 Course de Solidarność et des Champions Olympiques, Stanisław Aniołkowski
Hungary Time Trial Championships, Attila Valter
Poland Road Race Championships, Michał Paluta
Overall Dookoła Mazowsza, Stanisław Aniołkowski

Stage 3, Stanisław Aniołkowski

Stage 1 Tour of Almaty, Patryk Stosz
Stages 2 & 5 Tour of Romania, Stanisław Aniołkowski

2020
Poland U23 Time Trial Championships, Szymon Krawczyk
Poland Road Race Championships, Stanisław Aniołkowski
Overall Bałtyk–Karkonosze Tour, Stanisław Aniołkowski

Stage 4, Stanisław Aniołkowski

Overall Course de Solidarność et des Champions Olympiques, Stanisław Aniołkowski

Stage 3, Stanisław Aniołkowski

Stage 1 Tour of Małopolska, Stanisław Aniołkowski
Stage 2 Giro del Friuli-Venezia Giulia, Szymon Krawczyk
GP Slovakia, Stanisław Aniołkowski

== National champions ==
2001
Czech Time Trial, Ondřej Sosenka
Poland Road Race, Radosław Romanik
Poland Time Trial, Piotr Przydział
Ireland Road Race, David McCann
Ireland Time Trial, David McCann
2002
Czech Time Trial, Ondřej Sosenka
Poland Time Trial, Krzysztof Szafrański
2003
Poland Road Race, Piotr Przydział
Latvia Road Race, Andris Naudužs
2004
Poland Time Trial, Sławomir Kohut
Bulgaria Road Race, Plamen Stoyanov
2009
Poland Road Race, Krzysztof Jeżowski
2011
Poland Road Race, Tomasz Marczyński
Poland Time Trial, Tomasz Marczyński
2012
Bulgaria Time Trial, Nikolay Mihaylov
2013
Czech Under-23 Time Trial, Josef Černý
2014
Poland Road Race, Bartłomiej Matysiak
Bulgaria Road Race, Nikolay Mihaylov
2015
Czech Under-23 Time Trial, Josef Černý
Poland Under-23 Road Race, Michał Paluta
Bulgaria Road Race, Nikolay Mihaylov
2016
Poland Under-23 Time Trial, Patryk Stosz
2017
Czech Track (Points race), František Sisr
Poland Under-23 Time Trial, Piotr Brożyna
2019
Hungary Time Trial, Attila Valter
Poland Road Race, Michał Paluta
2020
Poland Under-23 Time Trial, Szymon Krawczyk
Poland Road Race, Stanislaw Aniolkowski
