= Tomasz Kiendyś =

Polish cyclist

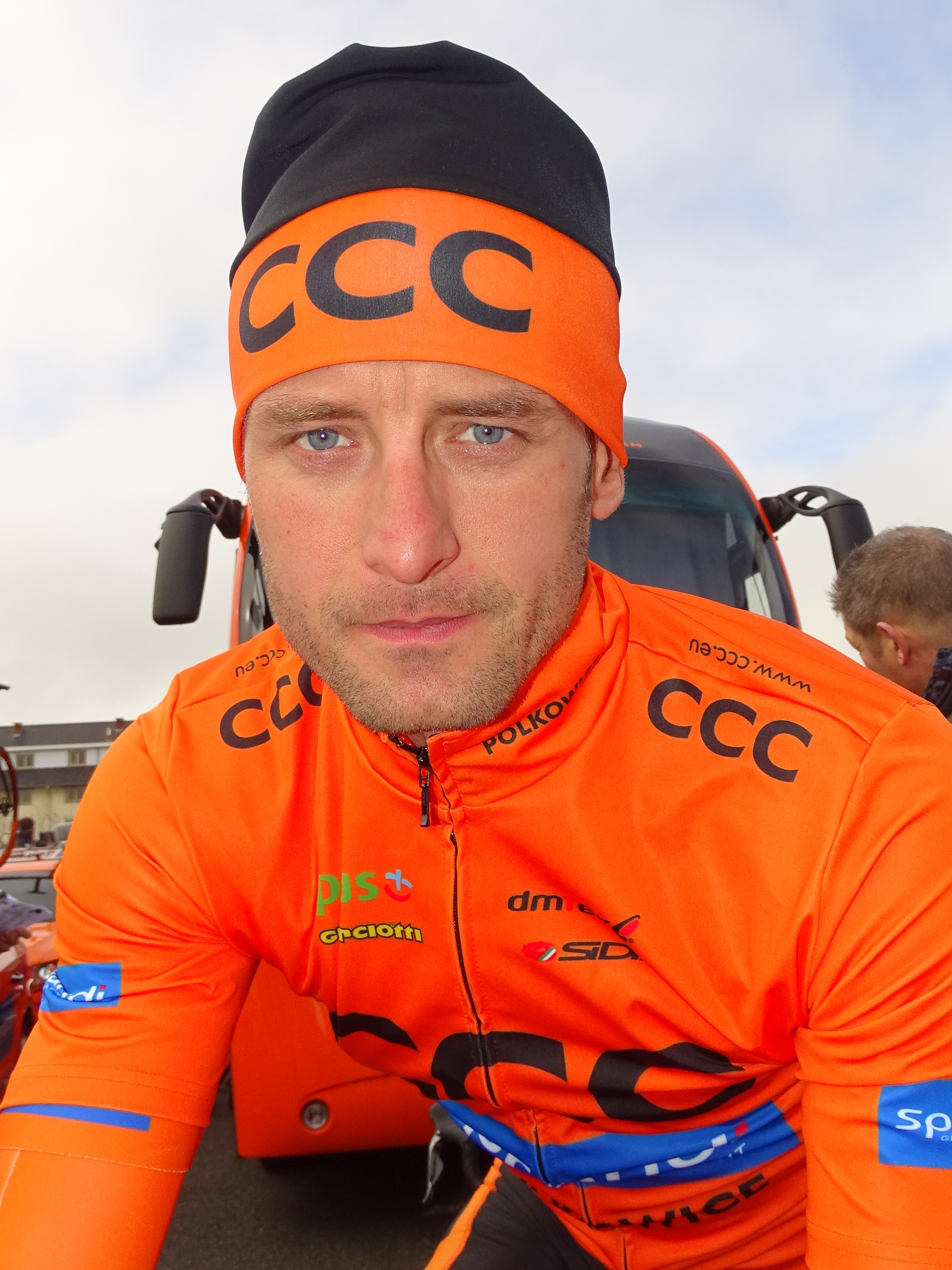
- Kiendyś in 2016

Personal information
- Born: 23 June 1977 (age 49) Lubusz Voivodeship, Poland
- Height: 1.85 m (6 ft 1 in)
- Weight: 78 kg (172 lb)

Cycling career
- Sport: Cycling
- Current team: Retired
- Discipline: Road
- Role: Rider

Professional teams
- 2001–2003: Mikomax
- 2004–2006: Knauf Team
- 2007–2016: CCC–Polsat–Polkowice

Tomasz Kiendyś (born 23 June 1977) is a Polish former racing cyclist, who competed professionally between 2001 and 2016, for the Mikomax, Knauf Team and CCC–Sprandi–Polkowice squads. He rode at the 2014 UCI Road World Championships.

== Major results ==
2001
8th Memoriał Andrzeja Trochanowskiego
2002
9th Memoriał Andrzeja Trochanowskiego
2004
3rd Overall Szlakiem Grodów Piastowskich

1st Mountains classification

10th Overall Peace Race
2005
1st Szlakiem Walk Majora Hubala
7th Sparkassen Giro Bochum
8th Overall Flèche du Sud
2006
1st Overall Szlakiem Grodów Piastowskich

1st Stage 2 (ITT)

1st Overall Dookoła Mazowsza
1st Stage 2 Rhône-Alpes Isère Tour
3rd Tartu GP
9th Schaal Sels
10th Overall Course de Solidarność et des Champions Olympiques

1st Stage 5

10th Memoriał Andrzeja Trochanowskiego
10th Neuseen Classics
2007
1st Overall Szlakiem Grodów Piastowskich

1st Stages 1 & 2 (ITT)

1st Overall Szlakiem Walk Majora Hubala
2nd Overall Flèche du Sud

1st Prologue

5th Memoriał Andrzeja Trochanowskiego
8th Boucle de l'Artois
9th Overall Bałtyk–Karkonosze Tour
9th Grand Prix de la ville de Nogent-sur-Oise
2008
1st Overall Szlakiem Walk Majora Hubala

1st Stage 2

1st Memoriał Andrzeja Trochanowskiego
1st Grand Prix Jasnej Góry
1st Stage 6 Dookoła Mazowsza
2nd Overall Szlakiem Grodów Piastowskich

1st Stage 4 (ITT)

4th Pomorski Klasyk
6th Tallinn–Tartu GP
6th Puchar Ministra Obrony Narodowej
8th Overall Course de Solidarność et des Champions Olympiques
2009
1st Puchar Ministra Obrony Narodowej
1st Stage 5 Tour du Maroc
2nd Memoriał Andrzeja Trochanowskiego
3rd Overall Dookoła Mazowsza
6th Overall Tour de Taiwan

1st Stage 7

10th Overall Tour of Małopolska
2010
1st Overall Szlakiem Walk Majora Hubala

1st Stage 1

2nd Grand Prix Jasnej Góry
6th Pomerania Tour
8th Overall Szlakiem Grodów Piastowskich
2011
1st Puchar Ministra Obrony Narodowej
5th Overall Dookoła Mazowsza
5th GP Herning
2012
1st Stage 1 Bałtyk–Karkonosze Tour
5th Overall Dookoła Mazowsza
2013
4th Puchar Ministra Obrony Narodowej
5th Overall Dookoła Mazowsza
8th Memoriał Andrzeja Trochanowskiego
2014
7th Overall Dookoła Mazowsza

1st Stage 1 (TTT)

9th Overall Tour of Estonia
2015
1st Stage 1b (TTT) Settimana Internazionale di Coppi e Bartali
7th Overall Dookoła Mazowsza
2016
1st Stage 3 Dookoła Mazowsza
2nd Memorial Grundmanna I Wizowskiego
