= Bartłomiej Matysiak =

Polish cyclist (born 1984)

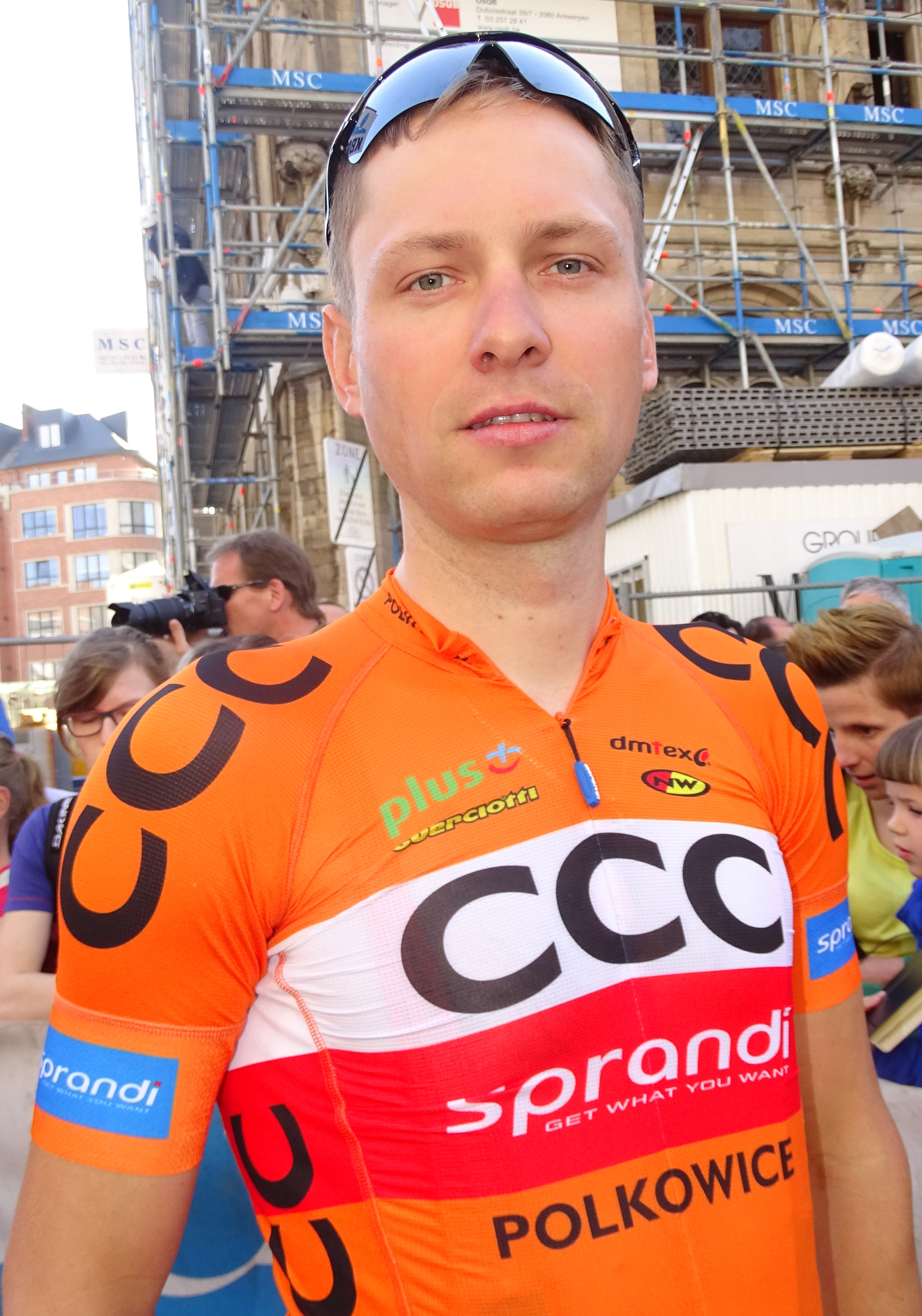
- Bartłomiej Matysiak at the 2015 Brabantse Pijl.

Personal information
- Full name: Bartłomiej Matysiak
- Born: 11 September 1984 (age 42) Poland
- Height: 1.84 m (6 ft 0 in)
- Weight: 71 kg (157 lb)

Cycling career
- Sport: Cycling
- Current team: Retired
- Discipline: Road
- Role: Rider
- Rider type: All-rounder

Professional teams
- 2007–2008: Legia–Felt
- 2009–2016: CCC–Polsat–Polkowice
- 2017: Team Hurom

Bartłomiej Matysiak (born 11 September 1984) is a Polish former professional racing cyclist, who rode professionally between 2007 and 2017.

== Major results ==
2005
8th Memoriał Andrzeja Trochanowskiego
2006
1st Overall Bałtyk–Karkonosze Tour

1st Stage 2

3rd Memoriał Henryka Łasaka
9th Overall FBD Insurance Rás

1st Stage 8

2007
8th Poreč Trophy
10th Memoriał Andrzeja Trochanowskiego
2008
1st Puchar Ministra Obrony Narodowej
2nd Road race, National Road Championships
8th Memoriał Andrzeja Trochanowskiego
10th Overall Dookoła Mazowsza
2009
2nd Overall Tour du Maroc
5th Overall Szlakiem Grodów Piastowskich
5th Overall Course de la Solidarité Olympique

1st Stage 6

10th Puchar Ministra Obrony Narodowej
2010
1st Puchar Ministra Obrony Narodowej
2011
5th Clásica de Almería
9th Gran Premio Nobili Rubinetterie
2012
10th Puchar Ministra Obrony Narodowej
2013
1st Puchar Ministra Obrony Narodowej
1st Mountains classification Szlakiem Grodów Piastowskich
4th Overall Tour of Estonia

1st Stage 3

4th Memoriał Andrzeja Trochanowskiego
6th Gran Premio Bruno Beghelli
7th Clásica de Almería
2014
1st Road race, National Road Championships
2nd Overall Memorial Grundmanna I Wizowskiego

1st Stage 1

5th Overall Tour of Małopolska

1st Stage 1

7th Clásica de Almería
9th Eschborn-Frankfurt – Rund um den Finanzplatz
2015
5th Trofej Umag
5th Poreč Trophy
2016
3rd Puchar Ministra Obrony Narodowej
7th Visegrad 4 Bicycle Race – GP Czech Republic
9th Eschborn-Frankfurt – Rund um den Finanzplatz
