= Jarosław Marycz =

Polish road bicycle racer

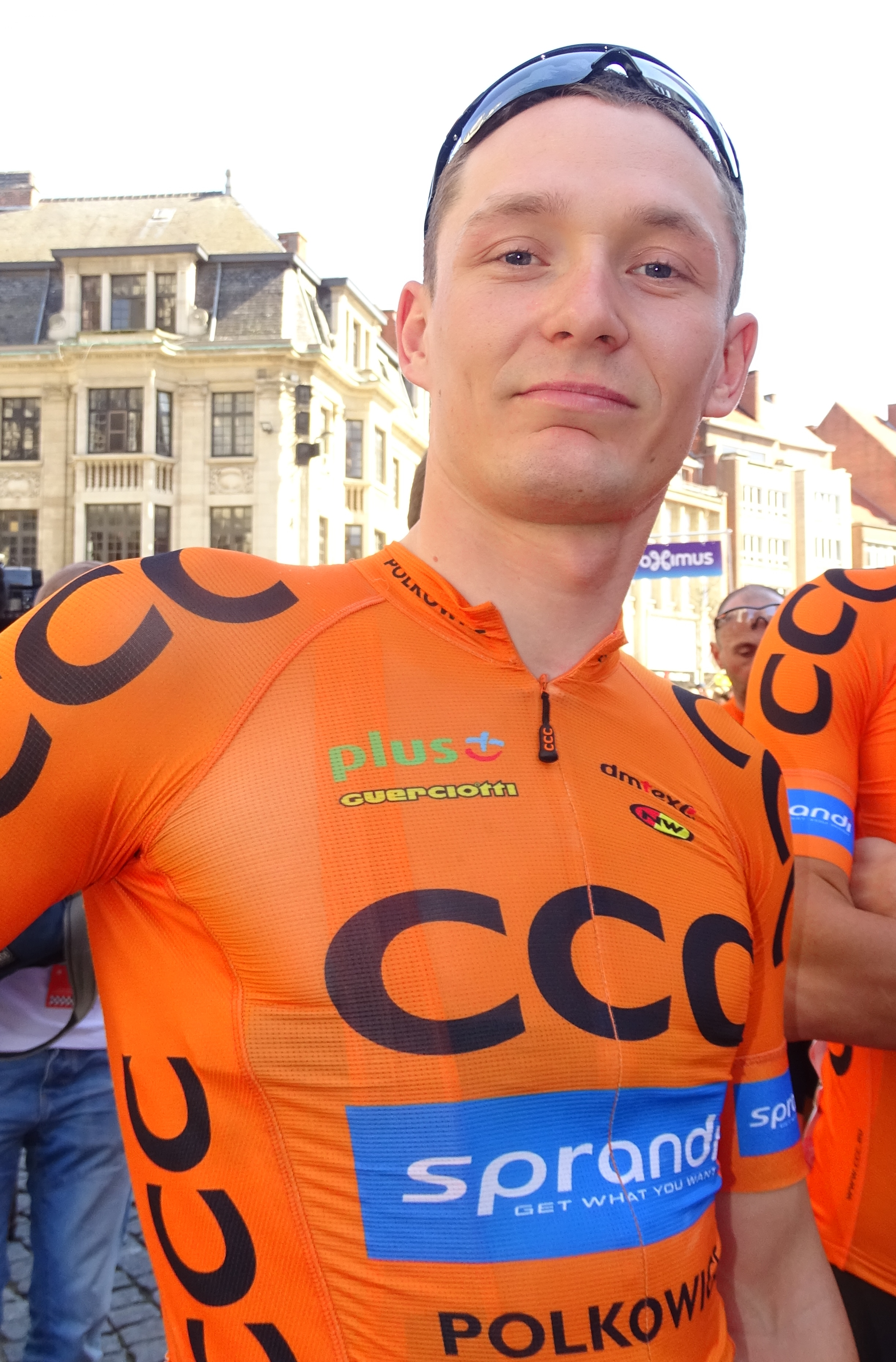
- Marycz at the 2015 Brabantse Pijl.

Personal information
- Full name: Jarosław Marycz
- Born: 17 April 1987 (age 39) Koszalin, Poland
- Height: 1.82 m (5 ft 11 1/2 in)
- Weight: 69 kg (152 lb)

Cycling career
- Sport: Cycling
- Discipline: Road
- Role: Rider
- Rider type: Time-trialist

Amateur teams
- 2006–2008: Team Fidibc.com
- 2008: Tinkoff Credit Systems (stagiaire)
- 2009: Viris Vigevano

Professional teams
- 2010–2012: Team Saxo Bank
- 2013–2016: CCC–Polsat–Polkowice
- 2017: Domin Sport
- 2018: Wibatech Merx 7R

Major wins
- National time trial champion (2010)

Jarosław Marycz (born 17 April 1987) is a Polish road bicycle racer, who most recently rode for UCI Continental Team Wibatech Merx 7R.

== Biography ==
Born in Koszalin, Marycz turned professional with the UCI Professional Continental team Tinkoff Credit Systems in 2008. In 2009, Marycz was leading the European U-23 road racing championships in a breakaway near the end of the race, but was caught 20 meters from the finish line by Kris Boeckmans, finishing second.

In 2010, he moved to UCI ProTeam Team Saxo Bank. After three seasons with the team, his contract was not renewed. Marycz joined the CCC–Polsat–Polkowice team for the 2013 season, on a one-year contract. He remained with the team for a second season in 2014.

He rode in the 2015 Giro d'Italia, but did not finish stage 12.

== Major results ==
2005
2nd Overall Giro della Lunigiana

1st Stage 2

4th Time trial, UCI Juniors World Championships
10th Road race, UEC European Junior Road Championships
2006
8th GP Demy-Cars
2007
2nd Piccola Coppa Agostoni
3rd Coppa Città di Asti
4th Trofeo Città di Brescia
7th Overall Tour du Loir-et-Cher

1st Stage 4

7th Overall Flèche du Sud
2008
1st Time trial, National Under-23 Road Championships
1st Tour de Berne
1st Trofeo Alcide Degasperi
1st GP Inda
3rd La Roue Tourangelle
3rd Coppa della Pace
3rd Grand Prix Cristal Energie
4th GP Capodarco
6th Classic Loire Atlantique
9th Trofeo Internazionale Bastianelli
9th Trofeo Marini Silvano Cappelli
2009
1st Time trial, National Under-23 Road Championships
1st Coppa G. Romita
1st Stage 3 (ITT) Okolo Slovenska
2nd Road race, UEC European Under-23 Road Championships
4th Trofeo Città di San Vendemiano
4th Trofeo Alcide Degasperi
5th Trofeo Edil C
2010
1st Time trial, National Road Championships
2012
National Road Championships

4th Road race
6th Time trial

8th Grand Prix d'Isbergues
2013
5th Time trial, National Road Championships
10th Overall Szlakiem Grodów Piastowskich
2014
1st Overall Dookoła Mazowsza

1st Stage 1 (TTT)

6th Time trial, National Road Championships
9th Overall Szlakiem Grodów Piastowskich
10th ProRace Berlin
2015
1st Stage 1b (TTT) Settimana Internazionale di Coppi e Bartali
2016
5th London–Surrey Classic
6th Time trial, National Road Championships
2017
1st Stage 2 Dookoła Mazowsza
2018
9th Memorial Grundmanna I Wizowskiego
9th Grand Prix Minsk
