= Podlasie Tour =

Cycling race in Poland

Race details
- Date: July
- Region: Podlachia, Poland
- Discipline: Road
- Competition: UCI Europe Tour
- Type: Stage race
- Web site: serwer1432651.home.pl/mazovia-team/podlasie-tour/

History
- First edition: 2015
- Editions: 1 (as of 2015)
- First winner: Andriy Vasylyuk (UKR)
- Most wins: No repeat winners
- Most recent: Andriy Vasylyuk (UKR)

The Podlasie Tour is a stage cycling race held in the Podlachia Region, Poland. It was first held in 2015 and is part of the UCI Europe Tour in category 2.2.

== Winners ==
Year	Country	Rider	Team
2015	Ukraine	Andriy Vasylyuk	Kolss BDC Team
