= Coupe des Carpathes =

Polish cycling race

Race details
- Date: August
- Region: Subcarpathian Voivodeship, Poland
- English name: Cup of the Carpathians; Cup of the Carpathian Resorts
- Local name: Puchar Uzdrowisk Karpackich (in Polish)
- Discipline: Road
- Competition: UCI Europe Tour
- Type: One-day race
- Organiser: Duo Circuli

History
- First edition: 2002
- Editions: 17 (as of 2018)
- First winner: Tomasz Lisowicz (POL)
- Most wins: Adrian Honkisz (POL); Maciej Paterski (POL) (2)
- Most recent: Maciej Paterski (POL)

The Coupe des Carpathes is a one-day cycling race held annually in the Subcarpathian Voivodeship, Poland. It was first held in 2002, and since 2005 has been part of the UCI Europe Tour as a 1.2 event.

== Past winners ==
Year	Country	Rider	Team
2002	Poland	Tomasz Lisowicz	Mikomax-Browar Staropolski
2003	Slovakia	Jan Valach	Slovakia (national team)
2004	Poland	Arkadiusz Wojtas	Hoop–CCC–Polsat
2005	Poland	Radosław Romanik	DHL-Author
2006	Slovakia	Roman Bronis	Dukla Trencin
2007	Poland	Mateusz Mróz	CCC–Polsat–Polkowice
2008	Poland	Mariusz Witecki	Mróz-Action-Uniqa
2009	Germany	Mathias Belka	LKT Team Brandenburg
2010	Poland	Marek Rutkiewicz	Mróz-Active Jet
2011	Poland	Jacek Morajko	CCC–Polsat–Polkowice
2012	Poland	Sylwester Janiszewski	CCC–Polkowice
2013	Poland	Adrian Honkisz	CCC–Polsat–Polkowice
2014	Poland	Paweł Franczak	ActiveJet Team
2015	Poland	Adrian Honkisz	CCC–Sprandi–Polkowice
2016	Italy	Antonino Parrinello	D'Amico–Bottecchia
2017	Poland	Maciej Paterski	CCC–Sprandi–Polkowice
2018	Poland	Maciej Paterski	
