= Szlakiem Walk Majora Hubala =

Cycling race in Poland

Race details
- Date: June
- Region: Poland
- Discipline: Road
- Competition: UCI Europe Tour
- Type: One-day race (2000–2006); Stage race (2007–)
- Web site: wyscighubala.pl

History
- First edition: 2000
- Editions: 14 (as of 2019)
- First winner: Cezary Zamana (POL)
- Most wins: Tomasz Kiendyś (POL) (4 wins)
- Most recent: Maciej Paterski (POL)

The Szlakiem Walk Majora Hubala is a multi-day road cycling race held annually in Poland. It was first held in 2000 and was part of the UCI Europe Tour in category 1.2 in 2005 and 2.2 from 2007 to 2010. The race was discontinued in 2010 until 2016 when it was revived. In 2017, the race re-entered UCI Europe Tour in category 2.1.

The race pays tribute to Major Henryk Dobrzański (nicknamed "Hubal").

== Winners ==
Year	Country	Rider	Team
2000	Poland	Cezary Zamana	Mat–Ceresit–CCC
2001	Poland	Tomasz Kłoczko	
2002	Poland	Radosław Romanik	CCC–Polsat
2003	Poland	Marcin Gębka	
2004	Poland	Kazimierz Stafiej	
2005	Poland	Tomasz Kiendyś	Knauf Team
2006	Poland	Tomasz Lisowicz	Knauf Team
2007	Poland	Tomasz Kiendyś	CCC–Polsat–Polkowice
2008	Poland	Tomasz Kiendyś	CCC Polsat–Polkowice
2009	No race		
2010	Poland	Tomasz Kiendyś	CCC–Polsat–Polkowice
2011–2015	No race		
2016	Poland	Eryk Latoń	CCC–Sprandi–Polkowice
2017	Poland	Maciej Paterski	CCC–Sprandi–Polkowice
2018	Poland	Mateusz Taciak	CCC–Sprandi–Polkowice
2019	Poland	Maciej Paterski	Wibatech Merx 7R
