= 2015 Tour de Pologne =

Cycling race

2015 UCI World Tour, race 20 of 28

Race details
- Dates: 2–8 August 2015
- Stages: 7
- Distance: 1,076 km (669 mi)
- Winning time: 26h 04' 38"

Results
Jersey awarded to the overall winner	Winner	Jon Izagirre (ESP)	(Movistar Team)
	Second	Bart De Clercq (BEL)	(Lotto–Soudal)
	Third	Ben Hermans (BEL)	(BMC Racing Team)
Jersey awarded to the points classification winner	Points	Marcel Kittel (GER)	(Team Giant–Alpecin)
Jersey awarded to the mountains classification winner	Mountains	Maciej Paterski (POL)	(CCC–Sprandi–Polkowice)
Jersey awarded to the sprints classification winner	Sprints	Kamil Gradek (POL)	(Poland)
	Team	Lotto–Soudal	

The 2015 Tour de Pologne was the 72nd edition of the Tour de Pologne stage race. It took place from 2 to 8 August and was the twentieth race of the 2015 UCI World Tour. It was won by the Spanish cyclist Jon Izagirre.

== Schedule ==
Stage	Date	Route	Distance	Type	Winner
1	2 August	Warsaw to Warsaw	122 km (76 mi)	Flat stage	Marcel Kittel (GER)
2	3 August	Częstochowa to Dabrowa Górnicza	146 km (91 mi)	Flat stage	Matteo Pelucchi (ITA)
3	4 August	Zawiercie to Katowice	166 km (103 mi)	Flat stage	Matteo Pelucchi (ITA)
4	5 August	Jaworzno to Nowy Sącz	220 km (137 mi)	Medium-mountain stage	Maciej Bodnar (POL)
5	6 August	Nowy Sącz to Zakopane	223 km (139 mi)	Mountain stage	Bart De Clercq (BEL)
6	7 August	Terma Bukowina Tatrzańska to Bukowina Tatrzańska	174 km (108 mi)	Mountain stage	Sergio Henao (COL)
7	8 August	Kraków to Kraków	25 km (16 mi)	Individual time trial	Marcin Białobłocki (POL)

== Participating teams ==
As the Tour de Pologne is a UCI World Tour event, all seventeen UCI Pro Teams were invited automatically and obliged to enter a team into the race. Two wildcard teams were also given places: CCC–Sprandi–Polkowice and a Polish national team.

UCI WorldTeams

- AG2R La Mondiale
- Astana
- BMC Racing Team
- Etixx–Quick-Step
- FDJ
- IAM Cycling
- Lampre–Merida
- Lotto–Soudal
- Movistar Team
- Orica–GreenEDGE
- Cannondale–Garmin
- Team Giant–Alpecin
- Team Katusha
- LottoNL–Jumbo
- Team Sky
- Tinkoff–Saxo
- Trek Factory Racing

UCI Professional Continental teams

- CCC–Sprandi–Polkowice

National teams

- Poland (national team)

== Stages ==
=== Stage 1 ===
2 August 2015 — Warsaw to Warsaw, 122 km (75.8 mi)

The 2015 Tour de Pologne begins in Warsaw, with the shortest road stage of the entire race. After starting at the National Stadium, to make up the parcours of 122 km (75.8 mi), the peloton will complete ten laps of a circuit 12.2 km (7.6 mi). On the ninth lap, there will be an intermediate sprint at the Krasiński Square, whilst the sole categorised climb will be a third category ascent on the seventh lap, on the Karowa Street. Then, a sprint finish is expected, largely due to the very flat profile of the stage.

Stage 1 result

	Rider	Team	Time
1	Marcel Kittel (GER)	Team Giant–Alpecin	2h 43' 13"
2	Caleb Ewan (AUS)	Orica–GreenEDGE	+ 0"
3	Niccolò Bonifazio (ITA)	Lampre–Merida	+ 0"
4	Dennis Van Winden (NED)	LottoNL–Jumbo	+ 0"
5	Sébastien Turgot (FRA)	AG2R La Mondiale	+ 0"
6	Kris Boeckmans (BEL)	Lotto–Soudal	+ 0"
7	Andrea Guardini (ITA)	Astana	+ 0"
8	Lorenzo Manzin (FRA)	FDJ	+ 0"
9	Michał Kwiatkowski (POL)	Etixx–Quick-Step	+ 0"
10	Jon Izaguirre (ESP)	Movistar Team	+ 0"

General Classification after Stage 1

	Rider	Team	Time
1	Marcel Kittel (GER)	Team Giant–Alpecin	2h 43' 13"
2	Caleb Ewan (AUS)	Orica–GreenEDGE	+ 4"
3	Niccolò Bonifazio (ITA)	Lampre–Merida	+ 6"
4	Dennis Van Winden (NED)	LottoNL–Jumbo	+ 10"
5	Sébastien Turgot (FRA)	AG2R La Mondiale	+ 10"
6	Kris Boeckmans (BEL)	Lotto–Soudal	+ 10"
7	Andrea Guardini (ITA)	Astana	+ 10"
8	Lorenzo Manzin (FRA)	FDJ	+ 10"
9	Michał Kwiatkowski (POL)	Etixx–Quick-Step	+ 10"
10	Jon Izaguirre (ESP)	Movistar Team	+ 10"

=== Stage 2 ===
3 August 2015 — Częstochowa to Dąbrowa Górnicza, 146 km (90.7 mi)

The second stage will take the riders into Silesian Voivodeship. After the start in Częstochowa, the peloton will head southwards towards the Metropolis GZM. The intermediate sprints of the day will be in Siewierz and Będzin. There will also be two categorised climbs, again in Będzin but also in Dąbrowa Górnicza, where five laps of a 10 km (6.2 mi) circuit will be held. Again, it is predicted that the sprinters will dominate.

Stage 2 result

	Rider	Team	Time
1	Matteo Pelucchi (ITA)	IAM Cycling	3h 20' 12"
2	Marcel Kittel (GER)	Team Giant–Alpecin	+ 0"
3	Giacomo Nizzolo (ITA)	Trek Factory Racing	+ 0"
4	Kris Boeckmans (BEL)	Lotto–Soudal	+ 0"
5	Sacha Modolo (ITA)	Lampre–Merida	+ 0"
6	Niccolò Bonifazio (ITA)	Lampre–Merida	+ 0"
7	Salvatore Puccio (ITA)	Team Sky	+ 0"
8	Lasse Norman Hansen (DEN)	Cannondale–Garmin	+ 0"
9	Mitchell Docker (AUS)	Orica–GreenEDGE	+ 0"
10	Sébastien Turgot (FRA)	AG2R La Mondiale	+ 0"

General Classification after Stage 2

	Rider	Team	Time
1	Marcel Kittel (GER)	Team Giant–Alpecin	6h 03' 09"
2	Caleb Ewan (AUS)	Orica–GreenEDGE	+ 10"
3	Niccolò Bonifazio (ITA)	Lampre–Merida	+ 12"
4	Giacomo Nizzolo (ITA)	Trek Factory Racing	+ 12"
5	Marcus Burghardt (GER)	BMC Racing Team	+ 13"
6	Kris Boeckmans (BEL)	Lotto–Soudal	+ 16"
7	Sébastien Turgot (FRA)	AG2R La Mondiale	+ 16"
8	Salvatore Puccio (ITA)	Team Sky	+ 16"
9	Nikias Arndt (GER)	Team Giant–Alpecin	+ 16"
10	Lorenzo Manzin (FRA)	FDJ	+ 16"

=== Stage 3 ===
4 August 2015 — Zawiercie to Katowice, 166 km (103.1 mi)

The last stage designed for the sprinters is held within the Metropolis GZM. After the start in Zawiercie, the peloton will head east towards Tarnowskie Góry, where a special sprint will take place. Then, the riders will turn south-east and pass through Piekary Śląskie, Chorzów and Siemanowice Śląskie, each of which will host an intermediate sprint, before entering a finishing circuit 14.7 km (9.1 mi) in length, to be completed four times. On the second lap, there will be a third-category mountains sprint at the Korfantego street, and then on the fourth lap there will be a third-category mountains sprint at the Góreckiego street. The final 1 km (0.6 mi) is downhill, and speeds there reach 80 kilometres per hour (50 mph). The road is being used continuously since 2010 and saw victories for Yauheni Hutarovich, Marcel Kittel in 2011, Aidis Kruopis in 2012, Taylor Phinney in 2013 and Jonas Vangenechten the year before.

Stage 3 result

	Rider	Team	Time
1	Matteo Pelucchi (ITA)	IAM Cycling	3h 48' 41"
2	Giacomo Nizzolo (ITA)	Trek Factory Racing	+ 0"
3	Tom Van Asbroeck (BEL)	LottoNL–Jumbo	+ 0"
4	Roberto Ferrari (ITA)	Lampre–Merida	+ 0"
5	Niccolò Bonifazio (ITA)	Lampre–Merida	+ 0"
6	Gianni Meersman (BEL)	Etixx–Quick-Step	+ 0"
7	Marcel Kittel (GER)	Team Giant–Alpecin	+ 0"
8	Paweł Franczak (POL)	Polish National Team	+ 0"
9	Andrea Guardini (ITA)	Astana	+ 0"
10	Roger Kluge (GER)	IAM Cycling	+ 0"

General Classification after Stage 3

	Rider	Team	Time
1	Marcel Kittel (GER)	Team Giant–Alpecin	9h 51' 50"
2	Giacomo Nizzolo (ITA)	Trek Factory Racing	+ 6"
3	Caleb Ewan (AUS)	Orica–GreenEDGE	+ 10"
4	Marcus Burghardt (GER)	BMC Racing Team	+ 10"
5	Niccolò Bonifazio (ITA)	Lampre–Merida	+ 12"
6	Tom Van Asbroeck (BEL)	LottoNL–Jumbo	+ 12"
7	Sébastien Turgot (FRA)	AG2R La Mondiale	+ 16"
8	Salvatore Puccio (ITA)	Team Sky	+ 16"
9	Lorenzo Manzin (FRA)	FDJ	+ 16"
10	Nikias Arndt (GER)	Team Giant–Alpecin	+ 16"

=== Stage 4 ===
5 August 2015 — Jaworzno to Nowy Sącz, 220 km (136.7 mi)

The first stage which is not due to finish in a sprint. On the long parcours of 220 km (136.7 mi), there will be three categorised mountains – a second-category affair in Gruszowice, a first-category climb in Wysokie and an imposing first-category climb to Trzetrzewina. The maximum gradient there is 18%. The sole intermediate sprint is located in Wadowice, prior to the climbing. After the descent from Trzetrzewina, the peloton will complete three loops of a 7.6 km (4.7 mi) circuit in Nowy Sącz, to conclude the day's running.

Stage 4 result

	Rider	Team	Time
1	Maciej Bodnar (POL)	Tinkoff–Saxo	5h 14' 29"
2	Kamil Zieliński (POL)	Polish National Team	+ 0"
3	Gatis Smukulis (LAT)	Team Katusha	+ 0"
4	Caleb Ewan (AUS)	Orica–GreenEDGE	+ 20"
5	Luka Mezgec (SLO)	Team Giant–Alpecin	+ 20"
6	Tom Van Asbroeck (BEL)	LottoNL–Jumbo	+ 20"
7	Lasse Norman Hansen (DEN)	Cannondale–Garmin	+ 20"
8	Silvan Dillier (SUI)	BMC Racing Team	+ 20"
9	Lorenzo Manzin (FRA)	FDJ	+ 20"
10	Sébastien Turgot (FRA)	AG2R La Mondiale	+ 20"

General Classification after Stage 4

	Rider	Team	Time
1	Kamil Zieliński (POL)	Polish National Team	15h 6' 27"
2	Maciej Bodnar (POL)	Tinkoff–Saxo	+ 3"
3	Caleb Ewan (AUS)	Orica–GreenEDGE	+ 22"
4	Marcus Burghardt (GER)	BMC Racing Team	+ 22"
5	Tom Van Asbroeck (BEL)	LottoNL–Jumbo	+ 24"
6	Sébastien Turgot (FRA)	AG2R La Mondiale	+ 28"
7	Lorenzo Manzin (FRA)	FDJ	+ 28"
8	Salvatore Puccio (ITA)	Team Sky	+ 28"
9	Michał Kwiatkowski (POL)	Etixx–Quick-Step	+ 28"
10	Alexey Lutsenko (KAZ)	Astana	+ 28"

=== Stage 5 ===
6 August 2015 — Nowy Sącz to Zakopane, 223 km (138.6 mi)

The longest stage of the race is also the first mountainous stage, featuring eight categorised climbs. After starting from the previous day's finish site, Nowy Sącz, the peloton will firstly head south to get to Zakopane and will enter the finishing circuit half-way through it. They will pass through the first-category ascents of Ząb and Gubałówka (used for the first time) before passing through the finish line for the first time. From then, the riders will complete two laps of a circuit 54.4 km (33.8 mi) in length. This includes the first-category Głodówka and the previously mentioned Ząb and Gubałówka ascents. On the last lap, there are two intermediate sprints, held in Poronin and Koscielisko.

Stage 5 result

	Rider	Team	Time
1	Bart De Clercq (BEL)	Lotto Soudal	05h 48' 49"
2	Diego Ulissi (ITA)	Lampre–Merida	+3"
3	Sébastien Reichenbach (SUI)	IAM Cycling	+3"
4	Sergio Henao (COL)	Team Sky	+7"
5	Ben Hermans (BEL)	BMC Racing Team	+7"
6	Davide Rebellin (ITA)	CCC Sprandi Polkowice	+7"
7	Fabio Aru (ITA)	Astana	+7"
8	Christophe Riblon (FRA)	AG2R La Mondiale	+7"
9	Jon Izagirre (ESP)	Movistar Team	+7"
10	Ilnur Zakarin (RUS)	Team Katusha	+7"

General Classification after Stage 5

	Rider	Team	Time
1	Bart De Clercq (BEL)	Lotto Soudal	20h 55' 42"
2	Diego Ulissi (ITA)	Lampre–Merida	+4"
3	Davide Formolo (ITA)	Cannondale–Garmin	+6"
4	Ben Hermans (BEL)	BMC Racing Team	+9"
5	Jon Izagirre (ESP)	Movistar Team	+9"
6	Sébastien Reichenbach (SUI)	IAM Cycling	+9"
7	Fabio Aru (ITA)	Astana	+15"
8	Sergio Henao (COL)	Team Sky	+16"
9	Christophe Riblon (FRA)	AG2R La Mondiale	+17"
10	Ilnur Zakarin (RUS)	Team Katusha	+17"

=== Stage 6 ===
7 August 2015 — Terma Bukowina Tatrzańska to Bukowina Tatrzańska, 174 km (108.1 mi)

The queen stage of the 2014 Tour de Pologne is, since 2011, a circuit race around Bukowina Tatrzańska (although the village was visited in 2010). To make up the parcours of 174 km, the peloton will firstly completed a 5 km ride to Zakopane, three 5.3 km loops around Zakopane on which were two special sprints, a return 5 km ride before entering a 38.4 km loop to be completed four times. Each loop featured three climbs – a first category ascent to Ząb, with gradients reaching 11.5%, a first category ascent to Gliczarów Górny, with gradients reaching a huge 21.5% and the final, uncategorised ascent to Bukowina Tatrzańska. In total, the riders completed nearly 4000m of climbing during the stage. This stage should be the most decisive in the general classification.

Stage 6 result

	Rider	Team	Time
1	Sergio Henao (COL)	Team Sky	04h 38' 27"
2	Diego Ulissi (ITA)	Lampre–Merida	+8"
3	Lawson Craddock (USA)	Team Giant-Alpecin	+8"
4	Christophe Riblon (FRA)	AG2R La Mondiale	+8"
5	Fabio Aru (ITA)	Astana	+8"
6	Mikel Nieve (ESP)	Team Sky	+11"
7	Ben Hermans (BEL)	BMC Racing Team	+11"
8	Jon Izagirre (ESP)	Movistar Team	+11"
9	Davide Formolo (ITA)	Cannondale–Garmin	+11"
10	Bart De Clercq (BEL)	Lotto Soudal	+16"

General Classification after Stage 6

	Rider	Team	Time
1	Sergio Henao (COL)	Team Sky	25h 34' 15"
2	Diego Ulissi (ITA)	Lampre–Merida	+0"
3	Bart De Clercq (BEL)	Lotto Soudal	+10"
4	Davide Formolo (ITA)	Cannondale–Garmin	+11"
5	Ben Hermans (BEL)	BMC Racing Team	+14"
6	Jon Izagirre (ESP)	Movistar Team	+14"
7	Fabio Aru (ITA)	Astana	+17"
8	Christophe Riblon (FRA)	AG2R La Mondiale	+19"
9	Mikel Nieve (ESP)	Team Sky	+22"
10	Ilnur Zakarin (RUS)	Team Katusha	+27"

=== Stage 7 ===
8 August 2015 — Kraków to Kraków, 25 km (15.5 mi), individual time trial (ITT)

The last stage will be a time trial starting and finishing at the Main Square in Kraków. The route was identical to that of last year, and had the riders head south-east towards Wieliczka, before completing a U-turn in Wieliczka and heading north-west back to Kraków. Despite being virtually pan-flat, this stage is also scheduled to have a large impact on the general classification. As is customary of time trial stages, cyclists will set off in reverse order from where they were ranked in the general classification at the end of the previous stage.

Stage 7 result

	Rider	Team	Time
1	Marcin Białobłocki (POL)	Polish National Team	28' 45"
2	Vasil Kiryienka (BLR)	Team Sky	+2"
3	Rick Flens (NED)	LottoNL–Jumbo	+59"
4	Damien Howson (AUS)	Orica–GreenEDGE	+1' 09"
5	Jurgen Van den Broeck (BEL)	Lotto–Soudal	+1' 16"
6	Patrick Gretsch (GER)	AG2R La Mondiale	+1' 23"
7	Jon Izagirre (ESP)	Movistar Team	+1' 24"
8	Ilnur Zakarin (RUS)	Team Katusha	+1' 25"
9	Riccardo Zoidl (AUT)	Trek Factory Racing	+1' 26"
10	Maciej Bodnar (POL)	Tinkoff–Saxo	+1' 26"

General Classification

	Rider	Team	Time
1	Jon Izagirre (ESP)	Movistar Team	26h 04' 38"
2	Bart De Clercq (BEL)	Lotto–Soudal	+2"
3	Ben Hermans (BEL)	BMC Racing Team	+3"
4	Ilnur Zakarin (RUS)	Team Katusha	+14"
5	Fabio Aru (ITA)	Astana	+15"
6	Diego Ulissi (ITA)	Lampre–Merida	+19"
7	Christophe Riblon (FRA)	AG2R La Mondiale	+40"
8	Sergio Henao (COL)	Team Sky	+54"
9	Davide Formolo (ITA)	Cannondale–Garmin	+1' 23"
10	Mikel Nieve (ESP)	Team Sky	+1' 32"

== Category leadership table ==
Stage	Winner	General classification Żółta koszulka Skandia	Points classification Klasyfikacja punktowa Lang Team	Mountains classification Klasyfikacja górska Tauron	Intermediate Sprints Classification Klasyfikacja najaktywniejszych Lotto	Teams classification Klasyfikacja drużynowa	Best Polish rider Najlepszy Polak Lotos
1	Marcel Kittel	Marcel Kittel	Marcel Kittel	Adrian Kurek	Matej Mohorič	LottoNL–Jumbo	Michał Kwiatkowski
2	Matteo Pelucchi	Marcel Kittel	Marcel Kittel	Adrian Kurek	Kamil Gradek	LottoNL–Jumbo	Michał Kwiatkowski
3	Matteo Pelucchi	Marcel Kittel	Marcel Kittel	Adrian Kurek	Marcin Białobłocki	LottoNL–Jumbo	Michał Kwiatkowski
4	Maciej Bodnar	Kamil Zieliński	Marcel Kittel	Kamil Zieliński	Kamil Gradek	Tinkoff–Saxo	Kamil Zieliński
5	Bart De Clercq	Bart De Clercq	Marcel Kittel	Grega Bole	Kamil Gradek	BMC Racing Team	Tomasz Marczyński
6	Sergio Henao	Sergio Henao	Marcel Kittel	Maciej Paterski	Kamil Gradek	Lotto–Soudal	Tomasz Marczyński
7	Marcin Białobłocki	Jon Izagirre	Marcel Kittel	Maciej Paterski	Kamil Gradek	Lotto–Soudal	Tomasz Marczyński
Final		Jon Izagirre	Marcel Kittel	Maciej Paterski	Kamil Gradek	Lotto–Soudal	Tomasz Marczyński

Notes

- In stage two, Caleb Ewan, who was second in the points classification, wore the white jersey, because first placed Marcel Kittel wore the yellow jersey as leader of the general classification. Also, in stages three and four, Niccolò Bonifazio wore the white jersey for the same reason.
- In stage five, Gatis Smukulis, who was second in the mountains classification, wore the fuchsia jersey, because first placed Kamil Zieliński wore the yellow jersey as leader of the general classification.
