= Polish National Time Trial Championships =

National road cycling championship in Poland

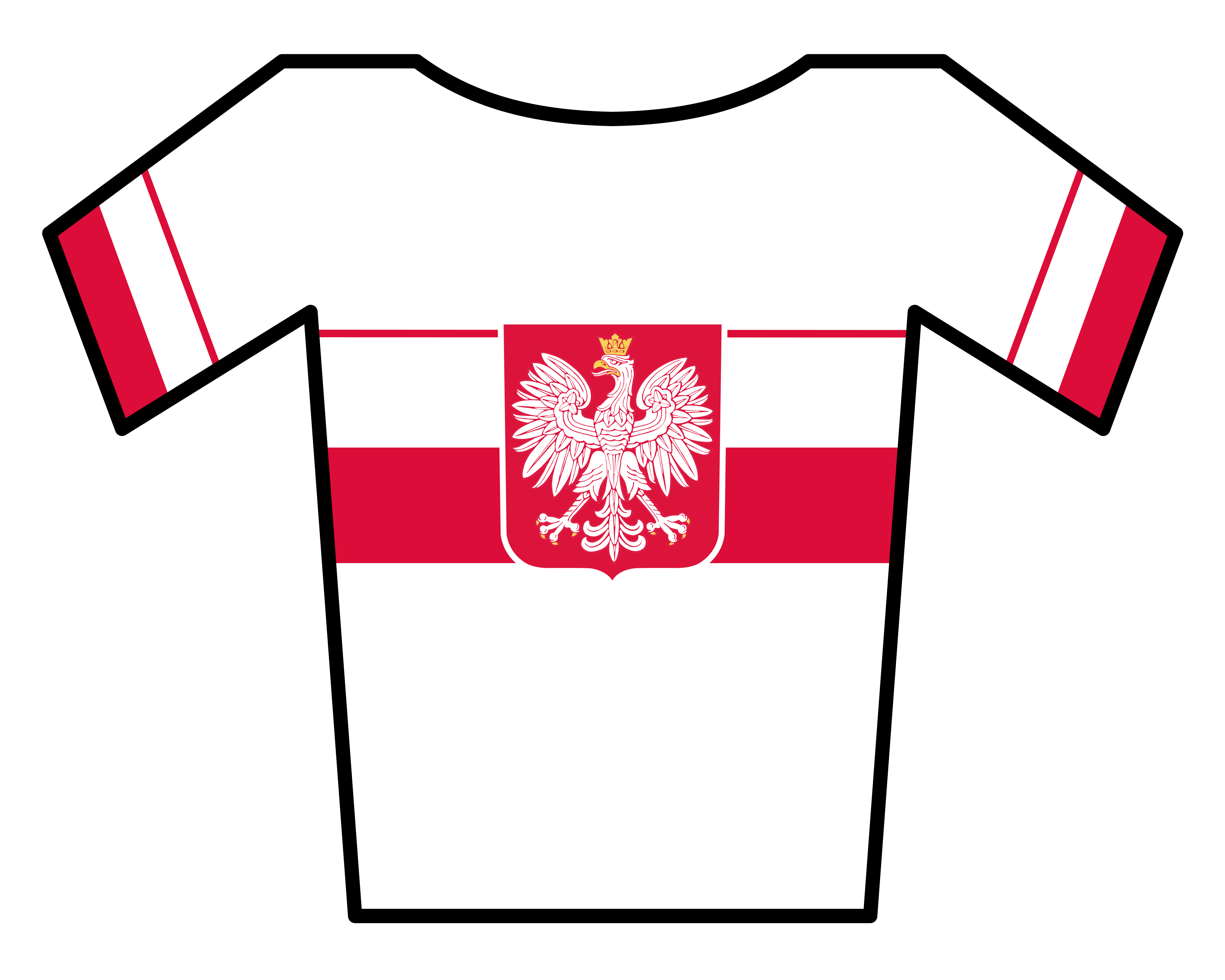
The champion's jersey

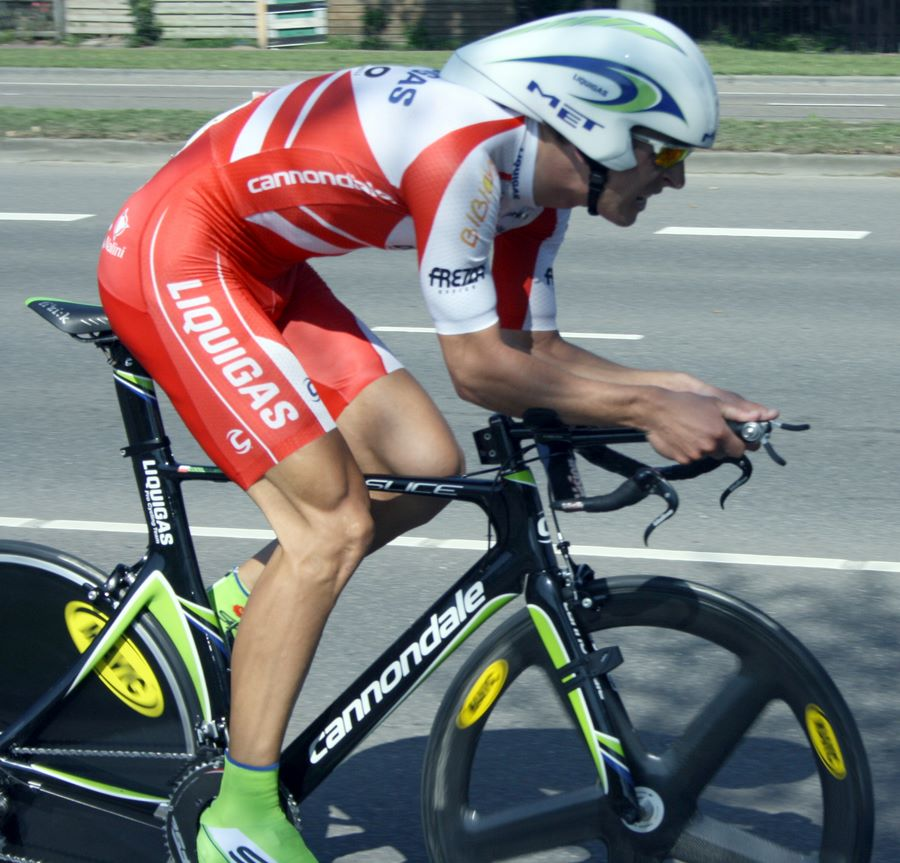
Maciej Bodnar (pictured in 2009) is the joint-record holder for the men's race, with eight victories.

The Polish National Time Trial Championship is a road bicycle race that takes place inside the Polish National Road Cycling Championships, and decides the best cyclist in this type of race. The first edition took place in 1970, and was won by Jan Magiera. The current men's champion is Maciej Bodnar, who has won the race a record eight times (tied with Tadeusz Mytnik). The current women's champion is Agnieszka Skalniak-Sójka.

== Men ==
=== Elite ===
Year	Gold	Silver	Bronze
1970	Jan Magiera	Mieczysław Nowicki	Paweł Kaczorowski
1971	Tadeusz Mytnik	Jan Magiera	Mieczysław Nowicki
1972	Tadeusz Mytnik	Ryszard Kozieł	Florian Andrzejewski
1973	Tadeusz Mytnik	Szczepan Klimczak	Ryszard Szurkowski
1974	Tadeusz Mytnik	Stanisław Babula	Stanisław Kirpsza
1975	Jan Jankiewicz	Czesław Lang	Florian Andrzejewski
1976	Florian Andrzejewski	Czesław Lang	Janusz Bieniek
1977	Julius Firkowski	Czesław Lang	Florian Andrzejewski
1978	Tadeusz Mytnik	Witold Plutecki	Henryk Santysiak
1979	Tadeusz Mytnik	Jan Raczkowski	Stanisław Kirpsza
1980	Tadeusz Mytnik	Jan Jankiewicz	Zbigniew Szczepkowski
1981	Stefan Janowski	Czesław Lang	Jerzy Świnoga
1982	Tadeusz Mytnik	Roman Jaskuła	Marek Leśniewski
1983	Stefan Janowski	Grzegorz Zieliński	Marek Leśniewski
1984	Lech Piasecki	Tadeusz Mytnik	Roman Jaskuła
1985	Lech Piasecki	Zenon Jaskuła	Paweł Bartkowiak
1986	Zenon Jaskuła	Paweł Bartkowiak	Andrzej Mierzejewski
1987	Zenon Jaskuła	Andrzej Mierzejewski	Marek Leśniewski
1988	Zenon Jaskuła	Jan Magosz	Joachim Halupczok
1989	Joachim Halupczok	Jan Magosz	Zenon Jaskuła
1990	Andrzej Barszcz	Andrzej Maćkowski	Jan Magosz
1991	Marek Leśniewski	Dariusz Baranowski	Andrzej Sypytkowski
1992	Piotr Chmielewski	Dariusz Baranowski	Marek Leśniewski
1993	Tomasz Brożyna	Piotr Chmielewski	Marek Leśniewski
1994	Bernard Bocian	Tomasz Brożyna	Krzysztof Szafrański
1995	Bernard Bocian	Krzysztof Szafrański	Tomasz Brożyna
1996	Piotr Chmielewski	Tomasz Brożyna	Bernard Bocian
1997	Dariusz Baranowski	Paweł Niedźwiecki	Piotr Chmielewski
1998	Piotr Przydział	Bernard Bocian	Andrzej Sypytkowski
1999	Sebastian Wolski	Tomasz Brożyna	Bernard Bocian
2000	Piotr Wadecki	Marcin Sapa	Bernard Bocian
2001	Piotr Przydział	Sławomir Kohut	Krzysztof Szafrański
2002	Krzysztof Szafrański	Wojciech Pawłak	Marcin Sapa
2003	Tomasz Lisowicz	Paweł Zugaj	Sławomir Kohut
2004	Sławomir Kohut	Krzysztof Ciesielski	Dawid Krupa
2005	Piotr Mazur	Bartosz Huzarski	Jarosław Rębiewski
2006	Piotr Mazur	Łukasz Bodnar	Jarosław Rębiewski
2007	Łukasz Bodnar	Jarosław Rębiewski	Mateusz Taciak
2008	Łukasz Bodnar	Maciej Bodnar	Mateusz Taciak
2009	Maciej Bodnar	Bartosz Huzarski	Mateusz Taciak
2010	Jarosław Marycz	Maciej Bodnar	Marcin Sapa
2011	Tomasz Marczyński	Łukasz Bodnar	Wojciech Ziółkowski
2012	Maciej Bodnar	Michał Kwiatkowski	Łukasz Bodnar
2013	Maciej Bodnar	Michał Kwiatkowski	Mateusz Taciak
2014	Michał Kwiatkowski	Maciej Bodnar	Mateusz Taciak
2015	Marcin Białobłocki	Kamil Gradek	Bartosz Huzarski
2016	Maciej Bodnar	Marcin Białobłocki	Mateusz Taciak
2017	Michał Kwiatkowski	Marcin Białobłocki	Maciej Bodnar
2018	Maciej Bodnar	Marcin Białobłocki	Michał Kwiatkowski
2019	Maciej Bodnar	Kamil Gradek	Marcin Białobłocki
2020	Kamil Gradek	Maciej Bodnar	Łukasz Wiśniowski
2021	Maciej Bodnar	Filip Maciejuk	Łukasz Wiśniowski
2022	Maciej Bodnar	Kamil Gradek	Szymon Rekita
2023	Michał Kwiatkowski	Maciej Bodnar	Kamil Gradek
2024	Filip Maciejuk	Kamil Gradek	Szymon Sajnok
2025	Filip Maciejuk	Kamil Małecki	Piotr Pękala

=== U23 ===
Year	Gold	Silver	Bronze
2004	Łukasz Bodnar	Piotr Mazur	Przemyslaw Pietrzak
2005	Rafał Ratajczyk	Mateusz Taciak	Błażej Janiaczyk
2006	Maciej Bodnar	Mateusz Taciak	Piotr Zieliński
2007	Maciej Bodnar	Dariusz Batek	Piotr Pyszny
2008	Jarosław Marycz	Łukasz Modzełewski	Maciej Paterski
2009	Jarosław Marycz	Adrian Kurek	Kornel Sójka
2010	Not held		
2011	Kamil Gradek	Paweł Brylowski	Łukasz Wisniowski
2012	Kamil Gradek	Paweł Bernas	Łukasz Wisniowski
2013	Łukasz Wisniowski	Przemysław Kasperkiewicz	Szymon Rekita
2014	Szymon Rekita	Przemysław Kasperkiewicz	Bartosz Warchoł
2015	Szymon Rekita	Patryk Stosz	Michał Paluta
2016	Patrik Stosz	Michał Paluta	Przemysław Kasperkiewicz
2017	Piotr Brożyna	Szymon Sajnok	Artur Sowinski
2018	Filip Maciejuk	Szymon Sajnok	Alan Banaszek
2019	Szymon Sajnok	Filip Maciejuk	Damian Papierski
2020	Szymon Krawczyk	Filip Maciejuk	Damian Papierski
2021	Filip Maciejuk	Damian Bieniek	Mateusz Kostanski
2022	Kacper Gieryk	Mateusz Gajdulewicz	Adam Woźniak

== Women ==
=== Elite ===
Year	Gold	Silver	Bronze
1984	Anna Gretner		
1988	Bogumiła Matusiak	Małgorzata Jędrzejewska	Małgorzata Sandej
1990	Marlena Ratusz		
1991	Dorota Warczyk		
1993	Małgorzata Jędrzejewska	Agnieszka Godras	Katarzyna Wróbel
1994	Bogumiła Matysiak	Małgorzata Jędrzejewska	Katarzyna Wróbel
1995	Bogumiła Matusiak	Agnieszka Godras	Małgorzata Jędrzejewska
1996	Bogumiła Matusiak	Agnieszka Godras	Monika Kotek
1997	Dorota Czynszak	Bogumiła Matusiak	Monika Kotek
1998	Dorota Czynszak	Bogumiła Matusiak	Monika Kotek
1999	Bogumiła Matusiak	Monika Tyburska	Anna Skawińska
2000	Monika Tyburska	Bogumiła Matusiak	Małgorzata Wysocka
2001	Bogumiła Matusiak	Anna Skawińska	Monika Tyburska
2002	Bogumiła Matusiak	Joanna Ignasiak	Monika Tyburska
2003	Joanna Ignasiak	Anna Skawińska	Paulina Brzeźna
2004	Małgorzata Wysocka	Bogumiła Matusiak	Joanna Ignasiak
2005	Bogumiła Matusiak	Anna Skawinska	Magdalena Zamolska
2006	Maja Włoszczowska	Magdalena Zamolska	Paulina Brzeźna
2007	Joanna Ignasiak	Magdalena Zamolska	Bogumiła Matusiak
2008	Bogumiła Matusiak	Paulina Brzeźna	Joanna Ignasiak
2009	Bogumiła Matusiak	Paulina Brzeźna	Katarzyna Pawłowska
2010	Maja Włoszczowska	Paulina Brzeźna	Eugenia Bujak
2011	Maja Włoszczowska	Eugenia Bujak	Ania Harkowska
2012	Martyna Klekot	Paula Gorycka	Eugenia Bujak
2013	Katarzyna Pawłowska	Eugenia Bujak	Paulina Brzeźna-Bentkowska
2014	Eugenia Bujak	Katarzyna Pawłowska	Katarzyna Niewiadoma
2015	Eugenia Bujak	Katarzyna Niewiadoma	Katarzyna Pawłowska
2016	Katarzyna Niewiadoma	Katarzyna Pawłowska	Małgorzata Jasińska
2017	Katarzyna Pawłowska	Alicja Ratajczak	Agnieszka Skalniak
2018	Małgorzata Jasińska	Katarzyna Pawłowska	Katarzyna Wilkos
2019	Anna Plichta	Małgorzata Jasińska	Aurela Nerlo
2020	Anna Plichta	Marta Jaskulska	Karolina Kumięga
2021	Karolina Karasiewicz	Aurela Nerlo	Marta Jaskulska
2022	Agnieszka Skalniak-Sójka	Marta Lach	Marta Jaskulska
2023	Agnieszka Skalniak-Sójka	Marta Lach	Marta Jaskulska
2024	Marta Jaskulska	Marta Lach	Marta Jaskulska
2025	Agnieszka Skalniak-Sójka	Katarzyna Niewiadoma	Marta Jaskulska
