= 2011 Tour de Pologne =

2011 UCI World Tour, race 19 of 27

Race details
- Dates: 31 July – 6 August
- Stages: 7
- Distance: 1,113.3 km (691.8 mi)
- Winning time: 26h 40' 01"

Results
Jersey awarded to the overall winner	Winner	Peter Sagan (Slovakia)	(Liquigas–Cannondale)
	Second	Dan Martin (Republic of Ireland)	(Garmin–Cervélo)
	Third	Marco Marcato (Italy)	(Vacansoleil–DCM)
Jersey awarded to the points classification winner	Points	Peter Sagan (Slovakia)	(Liquigas–Cannondale)
Jersey awarded to the mountains classification winner	Mountains	Michał Gołaś (Poland)	(Vacansoleil–DCM)
Jersey awarded to the sprints classification winner	Sprints	Adrian Kurek (Poland)	(Team Poland BGŻ)
	Team	Vacansoleil–DCM	

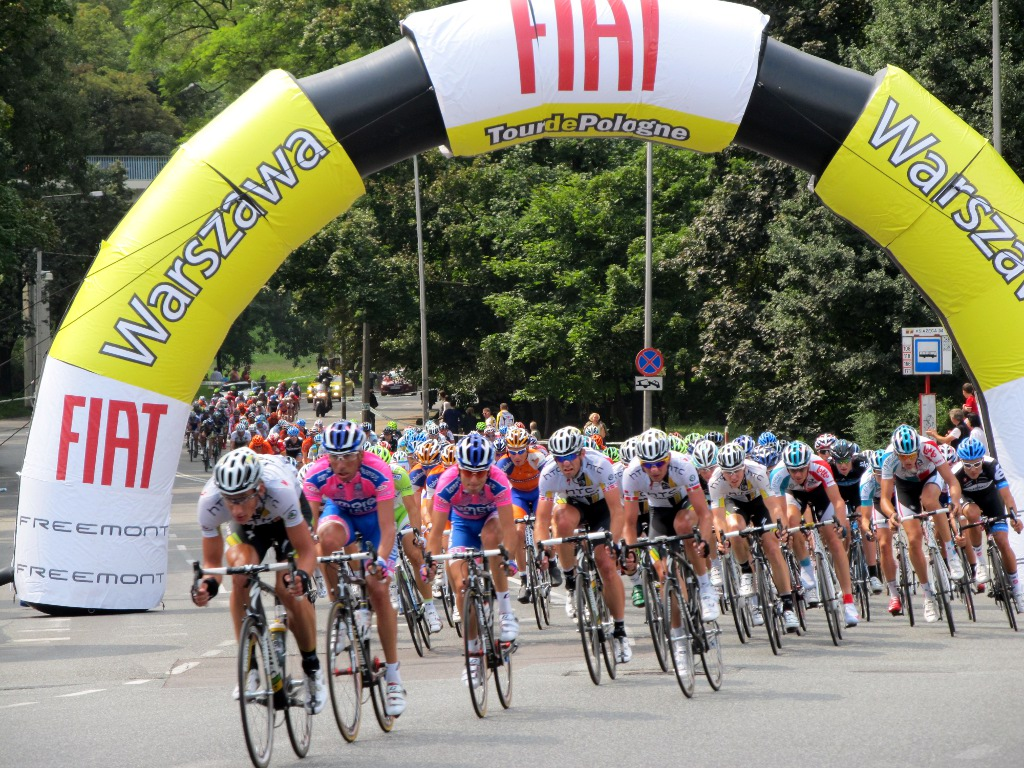
Tour de Pologne 2011 in Warsaw (stage 1)

The 2011 Tour de Pologne was the 68th running of the Tour de Pologne cycling stage race. It started on 31 July in Pruszków and finished on 6 August in Kraków. It was the 19th race of the 2011 UCI World Tour season.

The lead of the race changed hands in the final stage of the event. Garmin–Cervélo rider, and defending race winner, Dan Martin, who took the overall lead after a stage victory on the penultimate stage, had an advantage of three seconds to his nearest challengers Peter Sagan of Liquigas–Cannondale and Vacansoleil–DCM's Marco Marcato. Sagan had held the lead prior to Martin, having won the fourth and fifth stages, but lost his advantage after losing time in the closing metres of stage six, after an attack by Martin and Wout Poels, another Vacansoleil–DCM rider.

On the final stage, Sagan and Marcato moved closer to Martin at the intermediate sprint – offering time bonuses to the top three riders – by taking second and third behind Martin's team-mate Heinrich Haussler, with the winner of the Tour to be decided at the finish in Kraków. Despite missing out on the stage victory – taken by Skil–Shimano's Marcel Kittel, who took his fourth stage victory of the week – Sagan finished just behind in second place, and with a time bonus of six seconds, he overhauled Martin by five seconds. Marcato finished fifth on the stage to seal his third place in the general classification, two seconds behind Martin and seven behind Sagan.

In the race's other classifications, Vacansoleil–DCM rider Michał Gołaś won the King of the Mountains classification, Sagan won the points classification, Adrian Kurek of Team Poland BGŻ finished clear at the top of the sprints classification, with Vacansoleil–DCM also finishing at the head of the teams classification.

== Schedule ==
Aside from entering the Czech Republic (to the city of Český Těšín on the border with Poland) during the fourth stage, the race stages started and ended in Polish locations.

Stage	Date	Route	Distance	Type	Winner
1	31 July	Pruszków to Warsaw	101.5 km	Flat stage	Marcel Kittel (GER)
2	1 August	Częstochowa to Dąbrowa Górnicza	162 km	Flat stage	Marcel Kittel (GER)
3	2 August	Będzin to Katowice	135.7 km	Flat stage	Marcel Kittel (GER)
4	3 August	Oświęcim to Cieszyn	176.9 km	Medium-mountain stage	Peter Sagan (SVK)
5	4 August	Zakopane to Zakopane	201.5 km	Mountain stage	Peter Sagan (SVK)
6	5 August	Terma Bukowina Tatrzańska to Bukowina Tatrzańska	207.7 km	Mountain stage	Dan Martin (IRL)
7	6 August	Kraków to Kraków	128 km	Flat stage	Marcel Kittel (GER)

== Teams ==
The 18 teams from the UCI World Tour were automatically invited to this edition of the Tour de Pologne.

- Ag2r–La Mondiale
- Astana
- BMC Racing Team
- Euskaltel–Euskadi
- Garmin–Cervélo
- HTC–Highroad
- Lampre–ISD
- Leopard Trek
- Liquigas–Cannondale
- Omega Pharma–Lotto
- Quick-Step
- Rabobank
- Saxo Bank–SunGard
- Team Katusha
- Movistar Team
- Team RadioShack
- Team Sky
- Vacansoleil–DCM

4 teams were also awarded a wildcard place into the event:

- CCC–Polsat–Polkowice
- De Rosa–Ceramica Flaminia
- Team Poland BGŻ
- Skil–Shimano

== Stages ==
=== Stage 1 ===
31 July 2011 – Pruszków to Warsaw, 101.5 km (63.1 mi)

Stage 1 Result

	Rider	Team	Time
1	Marcel Kittel (GER)	Skil–Shimano	2h 07' 26"
2	Alexander Kristoff (NOR)	BMC Racing Team	s.t.
3	Francesco Chicchi (ITA)	Quick-Step	s.t.
4	Heinrich Haussler (AUS)	Garmin–Cervélo	s.t.
5	Michele Merlo (ITA)	De Rosa–Ceramica Flaminia	s.t.
6	Giacomo Nizzolo (ITA)	Leopard Trek	s.t.
7	Romain Feillu (FRA)	Vacansoleil–DCM	s.t.
8	Luca Paolini (ITA)	Team Katusha	s.t.
9	Juan José Haedo (ARG)	Saxo Bank–SunGard	s.t.
10	Adam Blythe (GBR)	Omega Pharma–Lotto	s.t.

General Classification after Stage 1

	Rider	Team	Time
1	Marcel Kittel (GER)	Skil–Shimano	2h 07' 16"
2	Alexander Kristoff (NOR)	BMC Racing Team	+ 4"
3	Adrian Kurek (POL)	Team Poland BGŻ	+ 5"
4	Francesco Chicchi (ITA)	Quick-Step	+ 6"
5	Fabio Piscopiello (ITA)	De Rosa–Ceramica Flaminia	+ 6"
6	Pierre Cazaux (FRA)	Euskaltel–Euskadi	+ 8"
7	Carlos Oyarzún (CHI)	Movistar Team	+ 9"
8	Heinrich Haussler (AUS)	Garmin–Cervélo	+ 10"
9	Michele Merlo (ITA)	De Rosa–Ceramica Flaminia	+ 10"
10	Giacomo Nizzolo (ITA)	Leopard Trek	+ 10"

=== Stage 2 ===
1 August 2011 – Częstochowa to Dąbrowa Górnicza, 162 km (101 mi)

Stage 2 Result

	Rider	Team	Time
1	Marcel Kittel (GER)	Skil–Shimano	3h 38' 35"
2	Heinrich Haussler (AUS)	Garmin–Cervélo	s.t.
3	Graeme Brown (AUS)	Rabobank	s.t.
4	Romain Feillu (FRA)	Vacansoleil–DCM	s.t.
5	John Degenkolb (GER)	HTC–Highroad	s.t.
6	Peter Sagan (SVK)	Liquigas–Cannondale	s.t.
7	Juan José Haedo (ARG)	Saxo Bank–SunGard	s.t.
8	Leigh Howard (AUS)	HTC–Highroad	s.t.
9	Adam Blythe (GBR)	Omega Pharma–Lotto	s.t.
10	Francesco Chicchi (ITA)	Quick-Step	s.t.

General Classification after Stage 2

	Rider	Team	Time
1	Marcel Kittel (GER)	Skil–Shimano	5h 45' 41"
2	Adrian Kurek (POL)	Team Poland BGŻ	+ 7"
3	Heinrich Haussler (AUS)	Garmin–Cervélo	+ 14"
4	Alexander Kristoff (NOR)	BMC Racing Team	+ 14"
5	Bartłomiej Matysiak (POL)	CCC–Polsat–Polkowice	+ 15"
6	Pierre Cazaux (FRA)	Euskaltel–Euskadi	+ 15"
7	Francesco Chicchi (ITA)	Quick-Step	+ 16"
8	Graeme Brown (AUS)	Rabobank	+ 16"
9	Fabio Piscopiello (ITA)	De Rosa–Ceramica Flaminia	+ 16"
10	Paolo Bailetti (ITA)	De Rosa–Ceramica Flaminia	+ 18"

=== Stage 3 ===
2 August 2011 – Będzin to Katowice, 135.7 km (84.3 mi)

Stage 3 Result

	Rider	Team	Time
1	Marcel Kittel (GER)	Skil–Shimano	3h 09' 29"
2	Romain Feillu (FRA)	Vacansoleil–DCM	s.t.
3	Jonas Aaen Jørgensen (DEN)	Saxo Bank–SunGard	s.t.
4	Giacomo Nizzolo (ITA)	Leopard Trek	s.t.
5	Adam Blythe (GBR)	Omega Pharma–Lotto	s.t.
6	Alexander Kristoff (NOR)	BMC Racing Team	s.t.
7	Tom Boonen (BEL)	Quick-Step	s.t.
8	Marco Marcato (ITA)	Vacansoleil–DCM	s.t.
9	John Degenkolb (GER)	HTC–Highroad	s.t.
10	Michael Matthews (AUS)	Rabobank	s.t.

General Classification after Stage 3

	Rider	Team	Time
1	Marcel Kittel (GER)	Skil–Shimano	8h 55' 00"
2	Adrian Kurek (POL)	Team Poland BGŻ	+ 17"
3	Gianluca Maggiore (ITA)	De Rosa–Ceramica Flaminia	+ 22"
4	Romain Feillu (FRA)	Vacansoleil–DCM	+ 24"
5	Heinrich Haussler (AUS)	Garmin–Cervélo	+ 24"
6	Alexander Kristoff (NOR)	BMC Racing Team	+ 24"
7	Bartłomiej Matysiak (POL)	CCC–Polsat–Polkowice	+ 25"
8	Francesco Chicchi (ITA)	Quick-Step	+ 26"
9	Jonas Aaen Jørgensen (DEN)	Saxo Bank–SunGard	+ 26"
10	Fabio Piscopiello (ITA)	De Rosa–Ceramica Flaminia	+ 26"

=== Stage 4 ===
3 August 2011 – Oświęcim to Cieszyn, 176.9 km (109.9 mi)

Stage 4 Result

	Rider	Team	Time
1	Peter Sagan (SVK)	Liquigas–Cannondale	4h 21' 15"
2	Dan Martin (IRL)	Garmin–Cervélo	+ 3"
3	Marco Marcato (ITA)	Vacansoleil–DCM	+ 3"
4	Paul Martens (GER)	Rabobank	+ 3"
5	Fabian Wegmann (GER)	Leopard Trek	+ 3"
6	Manuel Antonio Cardoso (POR)	Team RadioShack	+ 3"
7	Jan Bakelants (BEL)	Omega Pharma–Lotto	+ 3"
8	Enrico Gasparotto (ITA)	Astana	+ 3"
9	Romain Feillu (FRA)	Vacansoleil–DCM	+ 3"
10	Sergey Lagutin (UZB)	Vacansoleil–DCM	+ 3"

General Classification after Stage 4

	Rider	Team	Time
1	Peter Sagan (SVK)	Liquigas–Cannondale	13h 16' 35"
2	Marco Marcato (ITA)	Vacansoleil–DCM	+ 5"
3	Romain Feillu (FRA)	Vacansoleil–DCM	+ 7"
4	Dan Martin (IRL)	Garmin–Cervélo	+ 7"
5	Manuel Antonio Cardoso (POR)	Team RadioShack	+ 13"
6	Tomasz Marczyński (POL)	CCC–Polsat–Polkowice	+ 13"
7	Jan Bakelants (BEL)	Omega Pharma–Lotto	+ 13"
8	Fabian Wegmann (GER)	Leopard Trek	+ 13"
9	Luca Paolini (ITA)	Team Katusha	+ 13"
10	Sergey Lagutin (UZB)	Vacansoleil–DCM	+ 13"

=== Stage 5 ===
4 August 2011 – Zakopane to Zakopane, 201.5 km (125.2 mi)

Stage 5 Result

	Rider	Team	Time
1	Peter Sagan (SVK)	Liquigas–Cannondale	4h 52' 26"
2	Michael Matthews (AUS)	Rabobank	s.t.
3	Heinrich Haussler (AUS)	Garmin–Cervélo	s.t.
4	Marco Marcato (ITA)	Vacansoleil–DCM	s.t.
5	Peter Kennaugh (GBR)	Team Sky	s.t.
6	Romain Feillu (FRA)	Vacansoleil–DCM	s.t.
7	David Tanner (AUS)	Saxo Bank–SunGard	s.t.
8	John Degenkolb (GER)	HTC–Highroad	s.t.
9	Luca Paolini (ITA)	Team Katusha	s.t.
10	Rinaldo Nocentini (ITA)	Ag2r–La Mondiale	+ 3"

General Classification after Stage 5

	Rider	Team	Time
1	Peter Sagan (SVK)	Liquigas–Cannondale	18h 08' 51"
2	Marco Marcato (ITA)	Vacansoleil–DCM	+ 15"
3	Romain Feillu (FRA)	Vacansoleil–DCM	+ 17"
4	Dan Martin (IRL)	Garmin–Cervélo	+ 20"
5	Luca Paolini (ITA)	Team Katusha	+ 23"
6	Peter Kennaugh (GBR)	Team Sky	+ 23"
7	Tomasz Marczyński (POL)	CCC–Polsat–Polkowice	+ 26"
8	Jan Bakelants (BEL)	Omega Pharma–Lotto	+ 26"
9	Fabian Wegmann (GER)	Leopard Trek	+ 26"
10	Sergey Lagutin (UZB)	Vacansoleil–DCM	+ 26"

=== Stage 6 ===
5 August 2011 – Terma Bukowina Tatrzańska to Bukowina Tatrzańska, 207.7 km (129.1 mi)

Stage 6 Result

	Rider	Team	Time
1	Dan Martin (IRL)	Garmin–Cervélo	5h 41' 05"
2	Wout Poels (NED)	Vacansoleil–DCM	+ 1"
3	Marco Marcato (ITA)	Vacansoleil–DCM	+ 4"
4	Przemysław Niemiec (POL)	Lampre–ISD	+ 4"
5	Tiago Machado (POR)	Team RadioShack	+ 6"
6	Fredrik Kessiakoff (SWE)	Astana	+ 6"
7	Peter Kennaugh (GBR)	Team Sky	+ 6"
8	Paweł Cieślik (POL)	Team Poland BGŻ	+ 6"
9	Giampaolo Caruso (ITA)	Team Katusha	+ 6"
10	Christophe Riblon (FRA)	Ag2r–La Mondiale	+ 6"

General Classification after Stage 6

	Rider	Team	Time
1	Dan Martin (IRL)	Garmin–Cervélo	23h 50' 06"
2	Peter Sagan (SVK)	Liquigas–Cannondale	+ 3"
3	Marco Marcato (ITA)	Vacansoleil–DCM	+ 3"
4	Wout Poels (NED)	Vacansoleil–DCM	+ 17"
5	Peter Kennaugh (GBR)	Team Sky	+ 19"
6	Rinaldo Nocentini (ITA)	Ag2r–La Mondiale	+ 22"
7	Bartosz Huzarski (POL)	Team Poland BGŻ	+ 22"
8	Christophe Riblon (FRA)	Ag2r–La Mondiale	+ 22"
9	Steve Cummings (GBR)	Team Sky	+ 22"
10	Marek Rutkiewicz (POL)	CCC–Polsat–Polkowice	+ 26"

=== Stage 7 ===
6 August 2011 – Kraków to Kraków, 128.0 km (79.5 mi)

Stage 7 Result

	Rider	Team	Time
1	Marcel Kittel (GER)	Skil–Shimano	2h 50' 00"
2	Peter Sagan (SVK)	Liquigas–Cannondale	s.t.
3	Leigh Howard (AUS)	HTC–Highroad	s.t.
4	Heinrich Haussler (AUS)	Garmin–Cervélo	s.t.
5	Marco Marcato (ITA)	Vacansoleil–DCM	s.t.
6	Lucas Sebastián Haedo (ARG)	Saxo Bank–SunGard	s.t.
7	Nikolay Trusov (RUS)	Team Katusha	s.t.
8	Ian Stannard (GBR)	Team Sky	s.t.
9	Jan Bakelants (BEL)	Omega Pharma–Lotto	s.t.
10	Sergey Lagutin (UZB)	Vacansoleil–DCM	s.t.

Final General Classification

	Rider	Team	Time
1	Peter Sagan (SVK)	Liquigas–Cannondale	26h 40' 01"
2	Dan Martin (IRL)	Garmin–Cervélo	+ 5"
3	Marco Marcato (ITA)	Vacansoleil–DCM	+ 7"
4	Wout Poels (NED)	Vacansoleil–DCM	+ 22"
5	Peter Kennaugh (GBR)	Team Sky	+ 24"
6	Rinaldo Nocentini (ITA)	Ag2r–La Mondiale	+ 27"
7	Bartosz Huzarski (POL)	Team Poland BGŻ	+ 27"
8	Christophe Riblon (FRA)	Ag2r–La Mondiale	+ 27"
9	Steve Cummings (GBR)	Team Sky	+ 27"
10	Marek Rutkiewicz (POL)	CCC–Polsat–Polkowice	+ 31"

== Category leadership table ==
Stage	Winner	General classification Żółta koszulka	Mountains classification Klasyfikacja górska	Intermediate Sprints Classification Klasyfikacja najaktywniejszych	Points classification Klasyfikacja punktowa	Teams classification
1	Marcel Kittel	Marcel Kittel	Michał Gołaś	Adrian Kurek	Marcel Kittel	Quick-Step
2	Marcel Kittel	Marcel Kittel	Bartłomiej Matysiak	Adrian Kurek	Marcel Kittel	Quick-Step
3	Marcel Kittel	Marcel Kittel	Bartłomiej Matysiak	Adrian Kurek	Marcel Kittel	Quick-Step
4	Peter Sagan	Peter Sagan	Bartłomiej Matysiak	Adrian Kurek	Romain Feillu	Vacansoleil–DCM
5	Peter Sagan	Peter Sagan	Ruslan Pidgornyy	Adrian Kurek	Romain Feillu	Vacansoleil–DCM
6	Dan Martin	Dan Martin	Michał Gołaś	Adrian Kurek	Peter Sagan	Vacansoleil–DCM
7	Marcel Kittel	Peter Sagan	Michał Gołaś	Adrian Kurek	Peter Sagan	Vacansoleil–DCM
Final		Peter Sagan	Michał Gołaś	Adrian Kurek	Peter Sagan	Vacansoleil–DCM
