= List of Polish records in track cycling =

The following are the national records in track cycling in Poland maintained by the Polish Cycling Federation (in Polish: Polski Związek Kolarski).

== Men ==
Event	Record	Athlete	Date	Meet	Place	Ref
Flying 200 m time trial	9.416	Mateusz Rudyk	7 August 2024	Olympic Games	Saint-Quentin-en-Yvelines, France	
250 m time trial (standing start)	17.345	Maciej Bielecki	20 October 2016	European Championships	Saint-Quentin-en-Yvelines, France	
Flying 500 m time trial	27.290	Mateusz Lipa	7–8 December 2013		Pruszków, Poland	
Team sprint	42.872	Maciej Bielecki; Krzysztof Maksel; Mateusz Rudyk	6 December 2019	World Cup	Cambridge, New Zealand	
1 km time trial	59.001	Krzysztof Maksel	7 December 2013	World Cup	Aguascalientes, Mexico	
1 km time trial (sea level)	59.502	Patryk Rajkowski	6 October 2021	European Championships	Grenchen, Switzerland	
4000m individual pursuit	4:13.544	Kacper Majewski	6 August 2023	World Championships	Glasgow, United Kingdom	
4000m team pursuit	3:53.008	Kacper Majewski; Konrad Waliniak; Piotr Maślak; Daniel Staniszewski	14 March 2025	Nations Cup	Konya, Turkey	
Hour record	50.506 km	Wojciech Ziółkowski	3 July 2019		Pruszków, Poland	

== Women ==
Event	Record	Athlete	Date	Meet	Place	Ref
Flying 200 m time trial	10.749	Urszula Łoś	14 August 2022	European Championships	Munich, Germany	
250 m time trial (standing start)	18.860	Marlena Karwacka	10 January 2024	European Championships	Apeldoorn, Netherlands	
500 m time trial	33.592	Marlena Karwacka	13 January 2024	European Championships	Apeldoorn, Netherlands	
1 km time trial	1:06.832	Paulina Petri	15 February 2025	European Championships	Heusden-Zolder, Belgium	
Team sprint (500 m)	32.791	Marlena Karwacka; Urszula Łoś	6 December 2019	World Cup	Cambridge, New Zealand	
Team sprint (750 m)	46.901	Marlena Karwacka; Urszula Łoś; Nikola Sibiak	14 March 2025	Nations Cup	Konya, Turkey	
3000m individual pursuit	3:30.390	Katarzyna Pawłowska	18 January 2013	World Cup	Aguascalientes, Mexico	
4000m individual pursuit	4:39.658	Martyna Szczęsna	4 February 2026	European Championships	Konya, Turkey	
3000m team pursuit	3:27.086	Katarzyna Pawłowska; Eugenia Bujak; Małgorzata Wojtyra	19 October 2012	European Championships	Panevėžys, Lithuania	
4000m team pursuit	4:15.883	Olga Wankiewicz; Patrycja Lorkowska; Karolina Kumięga; Martyna Szczęsna	14 March 2025	Nations Cup	Konya, Turkey	
