= Krzysztof Szafrański =

Polish cyclist

Personal information
- Born: 21 November 1972 (age 53) Prudnik, Poland

Cycling career
- Sport: Cycling
- Current team: Retired
- Discipline: Road
- Role: Rider

Professional teams
- 2000–2003: CCC Polsat
- 2004: DHL-Author

Krzysztof Szafrański (born 21 November 1972) is a former Polish racing cyclist.

== Palmres ==
2001
3rd National Time Trial Championships
2002
1st Szlakiem Grodów Piastowskich
National Time Trial Champion
