= Marcin Białobłocki =

Polish cyclist (born 1983)

Marcin Bialoblocki
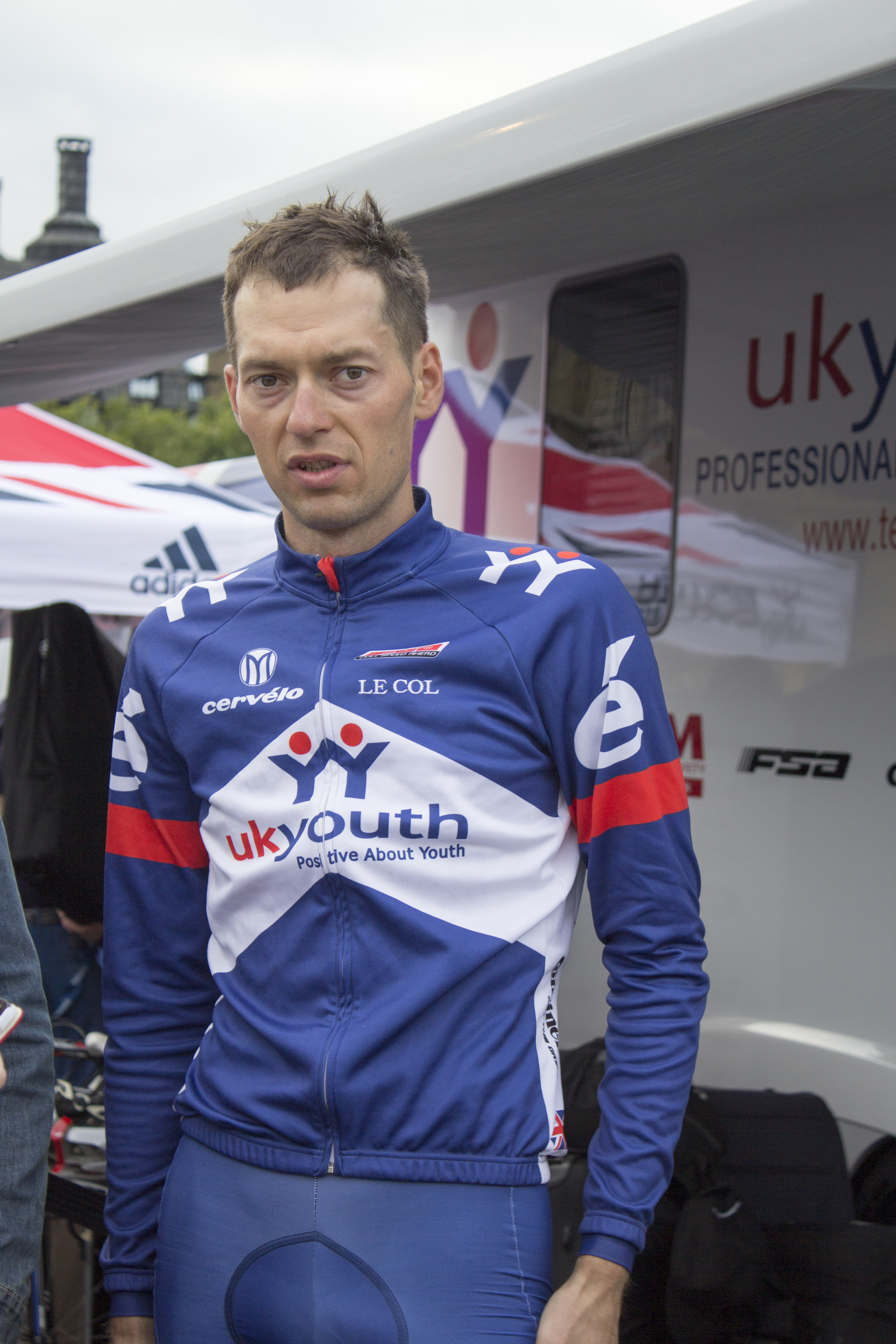

Personal information
- Born: 2 September 1983 (age 43) Sokółka, Poland
- Height: 197 cm (6 ft 6 in)
- Weight: 79 kg (174 lb)

Cycling career
- Sport: Cycling
- Discipline: Road
- Role: Rider
- Rider type: Time trialist

Amateur teams
- 2008–2009: Sport Beans–Willier
- 2010: Wilier / Bigmaggys.com / Prendas Ciclismo
- 2018: Steele Davis Via Roma RT
- 2019: Nopinz Symec RT
- 2022: Olsztyński Klub Sportowy "Warmia i Mazury"

Professional teams
- 2011–2012: Motorpoint Pro–Cycling Team
- 2013: Team UK Youth
- 2014: Velosure–Giordana
- 2015–2016: ONE Pro Cycling
- 2017: CCC–Sprandi–Polkowice

Major wins
- One-day races and Classics National Time Trial Championships (2015)

Marcin Białobłocki (born 2 September 1983) is a Polish cyclist, who competed for primarily British teams professionally between 2011 and 2017.

== Career ==
=== British domestic teams ===
He rejoined the Velosure team for the 2014 season, after his previous team – Team UK Youth – folded at the end of the 2013 season. In December 2014 he was announced as part of the inaugural squad for the ONE Pro Cycling team for the 2015 season. He took part in the 2015 Tour de Pologne as a member of the Polish national team, where he won the race's final stage time trial.

Białobłocki became a well known name in the UK time trialling community riding for ONE Pro Cycling when he took the 10 mile competition record from Alex Dowsett, with 16:36; making him the first rider to break 17 minutes. He then went on to take Dowsett's 25 mile competition record with a time of 44:04. This time was later improved on in 2018 when Białobłocki did a ride of 42:58 on the R25/3H course in Wales. In 2018 Białobłocki took the 50 mile competition record with a time of 1:30:31, three minutes faster than the previous record set only weeks before.

=== CCC–Sprandi–Polkowice (2017) ===
He joined the Polish team CCC–Sprandi–Polkowice in 2017, having ridden the previous two seasons for British team ONE Pro Cycling.

He was named in the start list for the 2017 Giro d'Italia.

== Major results ==
2008
6th Grand Prix of Wales
2009
1st Severn Bridge Road Race
1st Overall Girvan Three Day
2010
3rd East Yorkshire Classic
4th Overall Tour of the Reservoir
2011
1st Stage 6 An Post Rás
1st Jock Wadley Memorial
2nd Overall Tour of the Reservoir
2nd East Yorkshire Classic
2nd Severn Bridge Road Race
3rd Rutland–Melton CiCLE Classic
8th Overall Cinturón a Mallorca
2012
1st Round 8 - Torquay, Tour Series
1st Severn Bridge Road Race
2nd Lincoln Grand Prix
2nd Jock Wadley Memorial
3rd Newport Nocturne
6th Overall An Post Rás

1st Stage 1

2013
1st Overall An Post Rás
1st Perfs Pedal Race
1st Circuit of the Fens
2014
1st Cycle Wiltshire Grand Prix
2nd Severn Bridge Road Race
3rd Lincoln Grand Prix
7th Overall An Post Rás

1st Stage 5

10th Rutland–Melton CiCLE Classic
2015
1st Time trial, National Road Championships
1st Primavera Road Race
1st Betty Pharoah Memorial Legstretchers Road Race
Tour Series

1st Round 8 - Croydon
1st Round 10 - Bath

1st Stage 7 (ITT) Tour de Pologne
1st Stage 2 Tour of the Reservoir
2nd Chrono des Nations
3rd Perfs Pedal Race
5th Velothon Wales
5th Severn Bridge Road Race
6th Grand Prix des Marbriers
6th Ryedale Grand Prix
7th Overall Totnes-Vire Stage Race
8th Overall Ronde van Midden-Nederland
9th Time trial, UCI Road World Championships
9th London Nocturne
2016
1st Sprints classification, Dubai Tour
1st Stage 1 (TTT) Ronde van Midden-Nederland
2nd Time trial, National Road Championships
9th Time trial, UEC European Road Championships
2017
1st Stage 1b (TTT) Settimana Internazionale di Coppi e Bartali
2nd Time trial, National Road Championships
8th Overall Dookoła Mazowsza
2018
1st Welsh 25-Mile Time Trial Championships
2nd Time trial, National Road Championships
2019
3rd Time trial, National Road Championships
British Record for 100 mile Time trial
2022
5th Time trial, National Road Championships

=== Grand Tour general classification results timeline ===
Grand Tour	2017
Giro d'Italia	159
Tour de France	—
Vuelta a España	—

Legend
—	Did not compete
DNF	Did not finish
