= Małgorzata Wysocka =

Polish cyclist

Personal information
- Born: 15 June 1979 (age 47) Lublin, Poland

Cycling career
- Sport: Cycling
- Discipline: Road cycling

Professional teams
- 2002–2003: Bonda-Lukowski
- 2004: MKS Start Peugeot Andrzej Kita Lublin
- 2005–2006: SC Michela Fanini Record Rox
- 2007: POL-Aqua
- 2008: MKS Start Peugeot Lublin

Małgorzata Wysocka (born 15 June 1979) is a road cyclist from Poland. She represented her nation at the 2004 Summer Olympics. She also rode at the 1998, 2001, 2003 and 2004 UCI Road World Championships.
