= Filip Maciejuk =

Polish cyclist (born 1999)

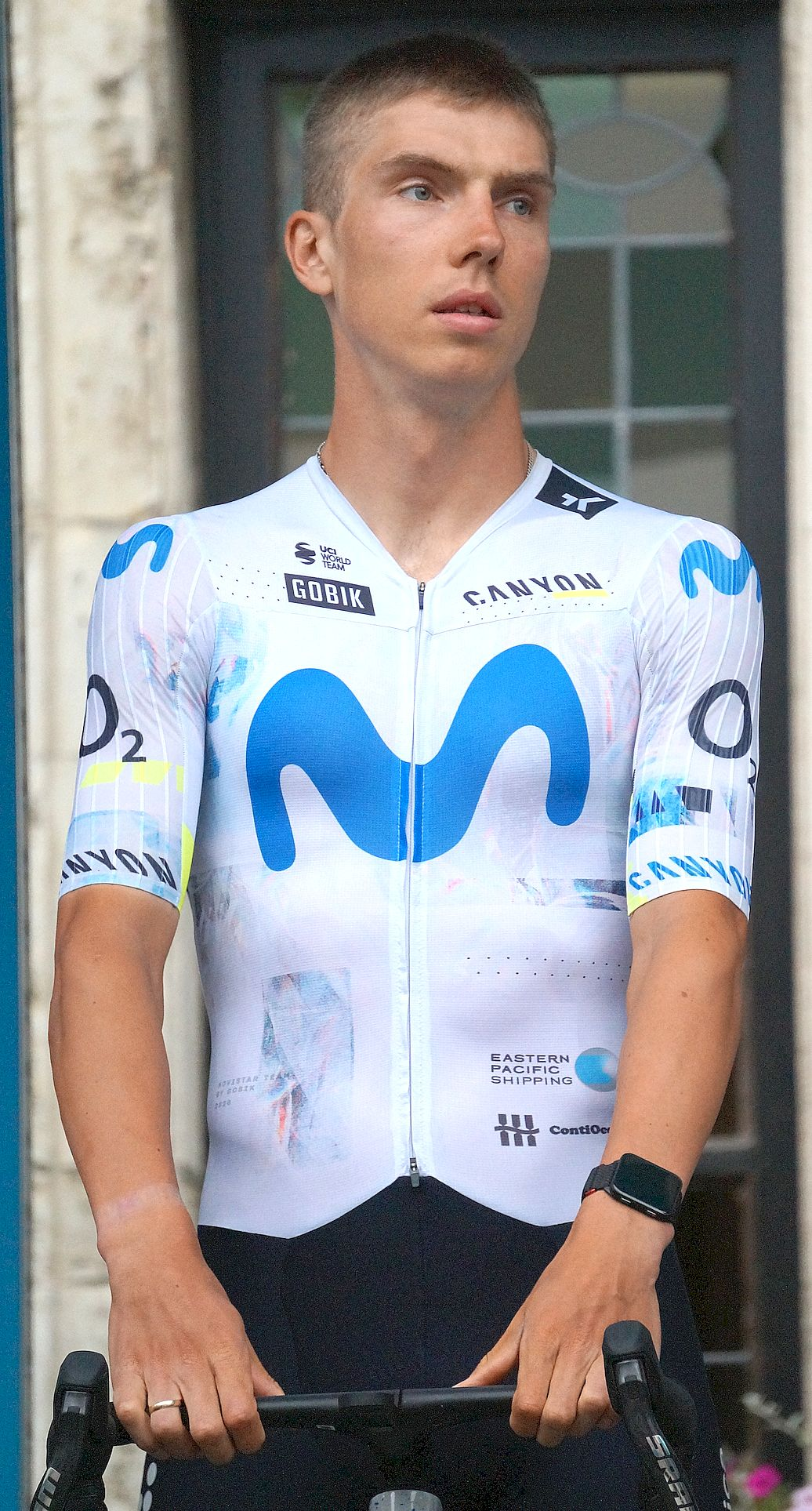
- Maciejuk in 2026

Personal information
- Full name: Filip Maciejuk
- Born: 3 September 1999 (age 27) Puławy, Poland
- Height: 1.9 m (6 ft 3 in)
- Weight: 78 kg (172 lb)

Cycling career
- Sport: Cycling
- Current team: Movistar Team
- Discipline: Road
- Role: Rider

Professional teams
- 2018–2021: Leopard Pro Cycling
- 2022–2023: Team Bahrain Victorious
- 2024–2025: Bora–Hansgrohe
- 2026–: Movistar Team

Major wins
- One-day races and Classics National Time Trial Championships (2024, 2025)

Filip Maciejuk (born 3 September 1999) is a Polish cyclist, who currently rides for UCI WorldTeam Movistar Team. On 14 August 2021 Maciejuk signed a two-year-long deal to ride for UCI WorldTeam Team Bahrain Victorious from 2022. In 2024, he moved to Bora–Hansgrohe after two seasons with Team Bahrain Victorious.

== 2023 Tour of Flanders ==
Maciejuk received backlash for causing a 30 rider crash during the 2023 Tour of Flanders. The crash was caused by him swerving into the peloton after having ridden off the road onto a path due to having hit a patch of grass. He was later handed a 30-day ban from racing in July by the UCI.

== Major results ==
2016
1st Time trial, National Junior Road Championships
3rd Overall La Coupe du President de la Ville de Grudziadz

1st Young rider classification
1st Stage 2

2017
1st Time trial, National Junior Road Championships
1st Overall La Coupe du President de la Ville de Grudziadz

1st Stage 2

3rd Time trial, UCI Junior Road World Championships
5th Overall Trofeo Karlsberg
7th Time trial, UEC European Junior Road Championships
2018 (1 pro win)
1st Overall Carpathian Couriers Race

1st Young rider classification

2nd Overall Szlakiem Walk Majora Hubala

1st Young rider classification
1st Stage 3 (ITT)

4th Time trial, National Road Championships
6th Overall Le Triptyque des Monts et Chateaux

1st Young rider classification

7th Time trial, UEC European Under-23 Road Championships
8th Chrono Champenois
10th Coupe des Carpathes
2019
2nd Time trial, National Under-23 Road Championships
2021
1st Overall Carpathian Couriers Race

1st Points classification
1st Stage 2

1st Overall L'Étoile d'Or

1st Stage 1 (ITT)

2022
4th Time trial, National Road Championships
2023
National Road Championships

2nd Road race
4th Time trial

7th Grand Prix Poland
2024 (1)
1st Time trial, National Road Championships
2025 (1)
National Road Championships

1st Time trial
4th Road race
