= Joanna Ignasiak =

Polish cyclist

Personal information
- Born: 14 October 1983 (age 43) Poland

Cycling career
- Sport: Cycling
- Discipline: Road cycling

Professional team
- 2008: POL-Aqua

Joanna Ignasiak (born 14 October 1983) is a road cyclist from Poland. She represented her nation at the 2003 UCI Road World Championships. In 2007, she won the Polish National Time Trial Championships.
