= Daniel Westmattelmann =

German bicycle racer

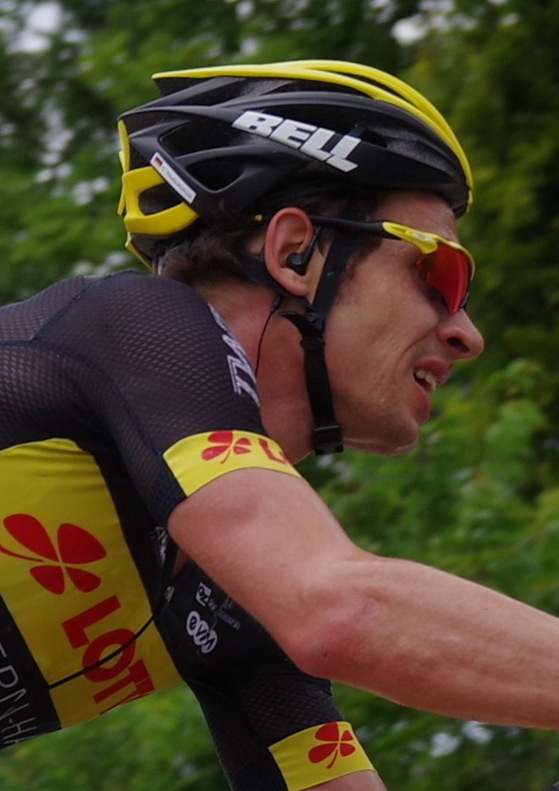
- Westmattelmann in 2017

Personal information
- Full name: Daniel Westmattelmann
- Born: October 31, 1987 (age 38) Ahlen, Germany
- Height: 1.86 m (6 ft 1 in)
- Weight: 75 kg (165 lb)

Cycling career
- Sport: Cycling
- Current team: RSV Münster
- Discipline: Road
- Role: Rider
- Rider type: Time trialist

Amateur teams
- 2004–2006: RSG Harsewinkel
- 2004: RSV Nordrhein-Westfalen
- 2005–2006: RG König Pilsener
- 2019–: RSV Münster

Professional teams
- 2007: Akud Rose
- 2008: Team Mapei Heizomat
- 2009: Seven Stones
- 2010–2018: Kuota–Indeland

Daniel Westmattelmann (born 31 October 1987 in Ahlen) is a German road racing cyclist, who currently rides for German amateur team RSV Münster.

== Major results ==
2008
1st Time trial, National Universiade
2014
4th Time trial, National Road Championships
2015
8th Chrono des Nations
2016
1st Chrono Champenois
6th Chrono des Nations
