= Maciej Bodnar =

Road bicycle racer

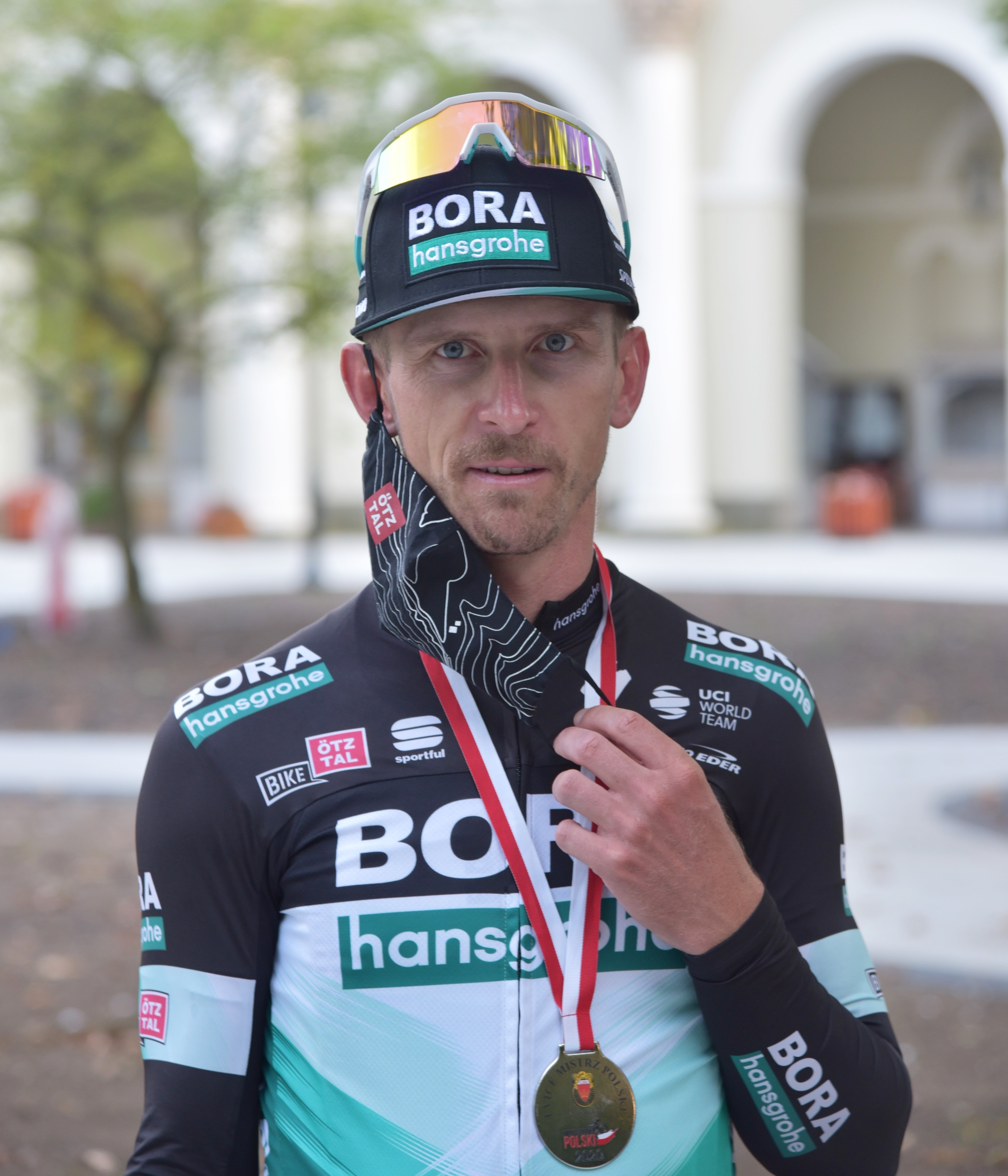
- Bodnar in 2020

Personal information
- Full name: Maciej Bodnar
- Born: 7 March 1985 (age 41) Oława, Poland
- Height: 1.86 m (6 ft 1 in)
- Weight: 75 kg (165 lb; 11 st 11 lb)

Cycling career
- Sport: Cycling
- Current team: Retired
- Discipline: Road
- Role: Rider
- Rider type: Time trialist

Amateur teams
- 2005: Moser–AH.nl
- 2006: Basso Piave

Professional teams
- 2007–2014: Liquigas
- 2015–2016: Tinkoff–Saxo
- 2017–2021: Bora–Hansgrohe
- 2022–2023: Team TotalEnergies

Major wins
- Grand Tours Tour de France 1 individual stage (2017) Giro d'Italia 1 TTT stage (2010) One-day races and Classics National Time Trial Championships (2009, 2012, 2013, 2016, 2018, 2019, 2021, 2022)
Medal record
Representing Poland
Men's road bicycle racing
European Championships
Silver medal – second place	2017 Herning	Time trial

Maciej Bodnar (born 7 March 1985, in Oława) is a Polish former professional road racing cyclist, who competed as a professional from 2007 to 2023. He is the brother of fellow racing cyclist Łukasz Bodnar. Bodnar was a team-mate of Peter Sagan throughout Sagan's career.

== Major results ==
2006
1st Time trial, National Under-23 Road Championships
2007
1st Time trial, National Under-23 Road Championships
1st Grand Prix Bradlo
2008
National Road Championships

2nd Time trial
3rd Road race

7th Overall Course de la Solidarité Olympique
2009
1st Time trial, National Road Championships
2010
1st Stage 4 (TTT) Giro d'Italia
1st Stage 1b (TTT) Settimana Internazionale di Coppi e Bartali
National Road Championships

2nd Time trial
3rd Road race

9th Time trial, UCI Road World Championships
2012
1st Time trial, National Road Championships
3rd Overall Three Days of De Panne
2013
1st Time trial, National Road Championships
2014
1st Stage 3b (ITT) Three Days of De Panne
2nd Time trial, National Road Championships
8th Overall Dubai Tour
2015
1st Stage 4 Tour de Pologne
2nd Overall Tour of Qatar
8th Time trial, UCI Road World Championships
2016
1st Time trial, National Road Championships
1st Stage 3b (ITT) Three Days of De Panne
4th Time trial, UCI Road World Championships
6th Time trial, Olympic Games
2017
Tour de France

1st Stage 20 (ITT)
Combativity award Stage 11

2nd Time trial, UEC European Road Championships
3rd Time trial, National Road Championships
2018
National Road Championships

1st Time trial
2nd Road race

1st Stage 1 (TTT) Czech Cycling Tour
2019
1st Time trial, National Road Championships
2020
2nd Time trial, National Road Championships
2021
1st Time trial, National Road Championships
7th Overall Okolo Slovenska
8th Time trial, UEC European Road Championships
2022
1st Time trial, National Road Championships
5th Time trial, UEC European Road Championships
2023
2nd Time trial, National Road Championships

=== Grand Tour general classification results timeline ===
Grand Tour	2009	2010	2011	2012	2013	2014	2015	2016	2017	2018	2019	2020	2021	2022
Giro d'Italia	—	127	—	117	—	—	—	—	—	—	—	107	136	—
Tour de France	—	—	143	—	114	112	—	159	116	122	—	—	—	115
/ Vuelta a España	131	—	—	138	—	122	140	—	—	—	—	—	—	—

Legend
—	Did not compete
DNF	Did not finish
