= 2015 Chrono des Nations =

Race details
- Dates: 18 October 2015
- Stages: 1
- Distance: 51.5 km (32.00 mi)
- Winning time: 1h 04' 36"

Results
	Winner	Vasil Kiryienka (BLR)
	Second	Marcin Białobłocki (POL)
	Third	Johan Le Bon (FRA)

The 2015 Chrono des Nations was the 34th edition of the Chrono des Nations cycle race and was held on 18 October 2015. The race started and finished in Les Herbiers. The race was won by Vasil Kiryienka.

== General classification ==
Final general classification

Rank	Rider	Time
1	Vasil Kiryienka (BLR)	1h 04' 36"
2	Marcin Białobłocki (POL)	+ 1' 12"
3	Johan Le Bon (FRA)	+ 1' 37"
4	Stéphane Rossetto (FRA)	+ 2' 02"
5	Nelson Oliveira (POR)	+ 2' 18"
6	Reidar Borgersen (NOR)	+ 2' 31"
7	Adriano Malori (ITA)	+ 2' 47"
8	Daniel Westmattelmann (GER)	+ 2' 48"
9	Olivier Pardini (BEL)	+ 3' 04"
10	James McLaughlin (GBR)	+ 3' 26"
