= Łukasz Wiśniowski =

Polish cyclist

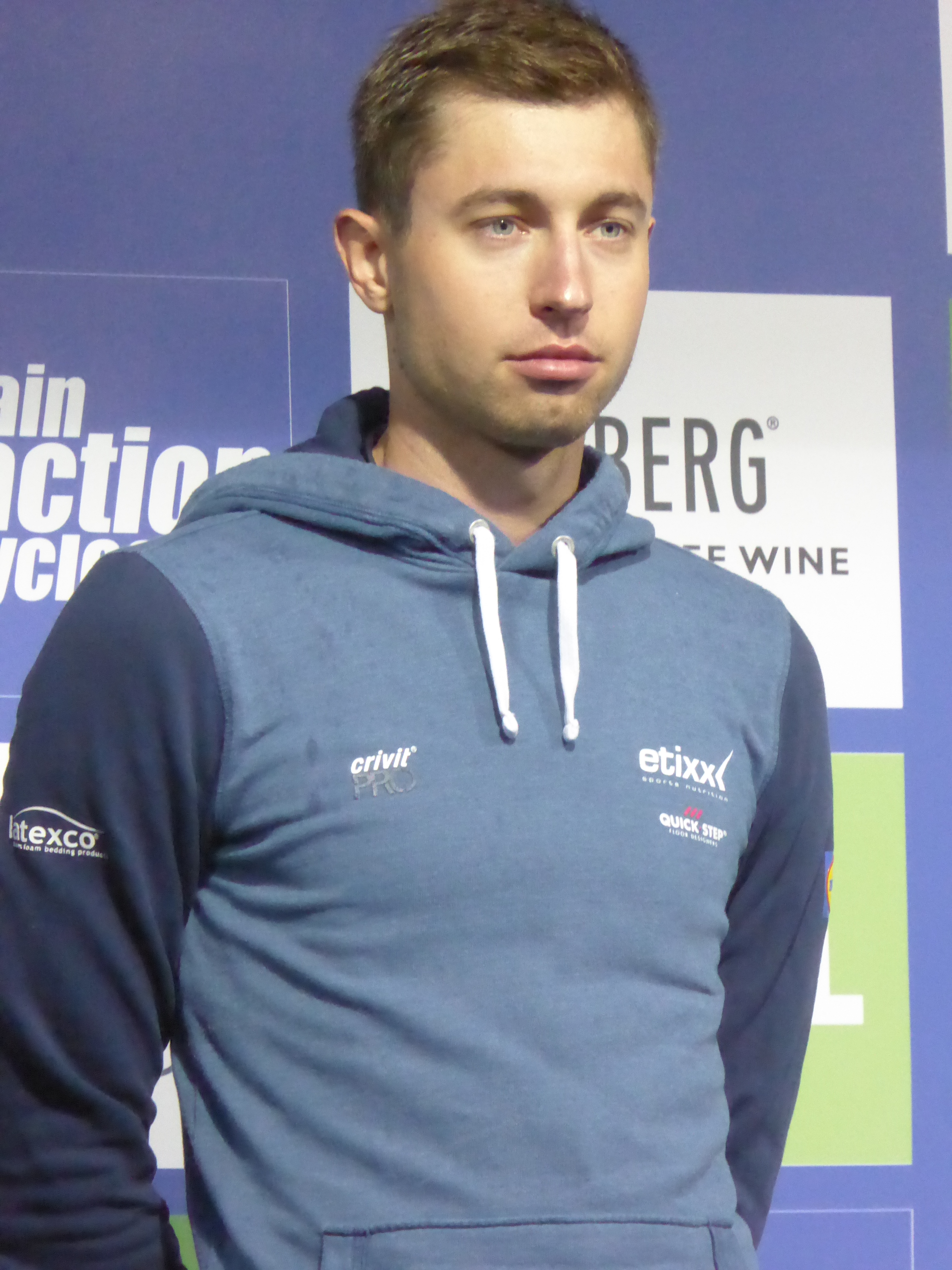
- Wiśniowski at the 2016 Tour of Britain.

Personal information
- Full name: Łukasz Wiśniowski
- Born: 7 December 1991 (age 34) Ciechanów, Poland
- Height: 1.90 m (6 ft 3 in)
- Weight: 79 kg (174 lb)

Cycling career
- Sport: Cycling
- Discipline: Road
- Role: Rider
- Rider type: Classics specialist

Amateur team
- 2013–2014: Etixx–IHNed

Professional teams
- 2015–2016: Etixx–Quick-Step
- 2017–2018: Team Sky
- 2019–2020: CCC Team
- 2021: Team Qhubeka Assos
- 2022–2023: EF Education–EasyPost
- 2024: Team Bahrain Victorious

Łukasz Wiśniowski (born 7 December 1991) is a Polish racing cyclist, who last rode for UCI WorldTeam Team Bahrain Victorious.

== Career ==
He rode at the 2013 UCI Road World Championships. He was named in the start list for the 2016 Giro d'Italia. In August 2016, Wiśniowski signed with Team Sky for the 2017 season. In July 2019, he was named in the startlist for the 2019 Tour de France. In October 2020, he was named in the startlist for the 2020 Vuelta a España.

In November 2020, Wiśniowski signed a one-year contract with Team Qhubeka Assos, for the 2021 season.

== Major results ==
2009
8th Time trial, UCI Juniors World Championships
2011
3rd Time trial, National Under-23 Road Championships
2012
National Under-23 Road Championships

3rd Road race
3rd Time trial

2013
National Under-23 Road Championships

1st Road race
1st Time trial

1st Stage 1 Thüringen Rundfahrt der U23
4th Overall Boucle de l'Artois
2014
1st Overall Circuit des Ardennes
1st Kattekoers
1st Stage 4 Tour de Normandie
4th Ster van Zwolle
5th Time trial, National Road Championships
5th Grand Prix Královéhradeckého kraje
6th Overall Tour de Bretagne
2015
1st Stage 1 (TTT) Czech Cycling Tour
2nd GP Briek Schotte
3rd Ronde van Zeeland Seaports
10th Overall Driedaagse van West-Vlaanderen
2016
1st Stage 1 (TTT) Tour de San Luis
2nd Overall Driedaagse van West-Vlaanderen
4th Road race, National Road Championships
5th Kuurne–Brussels–Kuurne
2017
7th Trofeo Playa de Palma
9th Trofeo Porreres–Felanitx–Ses Salines–Campos
2018
2nd Omloop Het Nieuwsblad
8th Kuurne–Brussels–Kuurne
2019
5th Time trial, National Road Championships
2020
3rd Time trial, National Road Championships
2021
3rd Time trial, National Road Championships

=== Grand Tour general classification results timeline ===
Grand Tour	2016	2017	2018	2019	2020	2021
Giro d'Italia	138	—	—	—	—	131
Tour de France	—	—	—	127	—	—
Vuelta a España	—	—	—	—	115	—

Legend
—	Did not compete
DNF	Did not finish
IP	In progress
