= AG2R La Mondiale =

French insurance firm

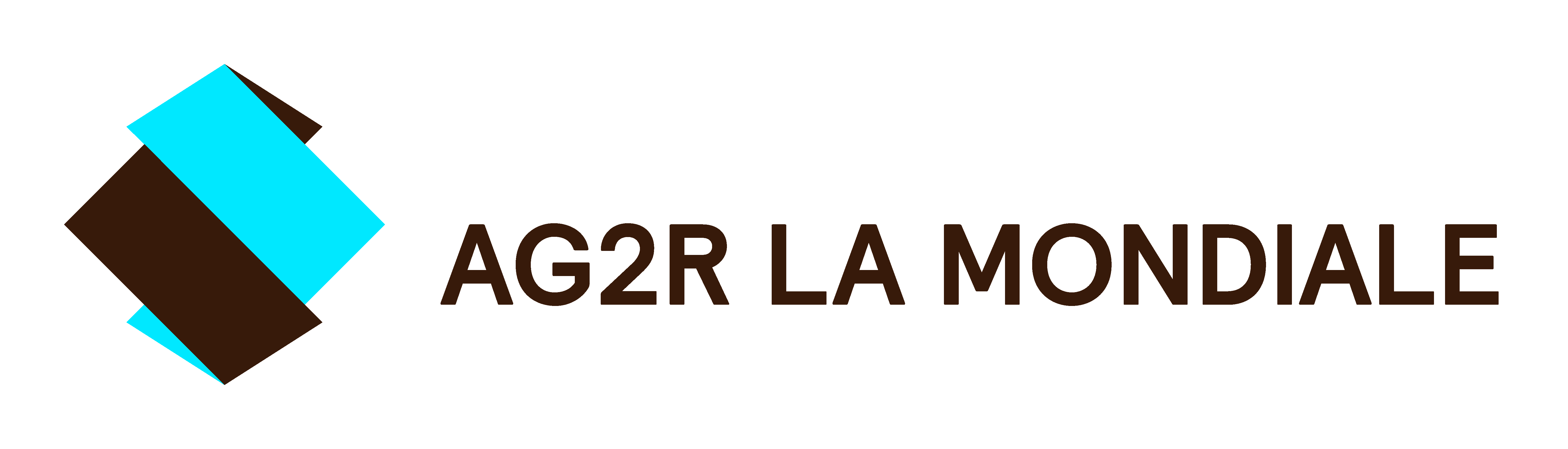
- Company type: Association déclarée (Not-for-profit organization)
- Industry: Insurance industry
- Predecessor: La Mondiale, l’AGRR
- Founded: 1905; 121 years ago
- Headquarters: Paris, France
- Area served: France
- Products: Health insurance, life insurance, investments, supplementary pensions
- Number of employees: 15,000 (2025)
- Website: ag2rlamondiale.fr

AG2R La Mondiale is a French multinational insurance firm headquartered in Paris that engages in global insurance, financial services, supplementary retirement fund and supplementary pension.

With €29 billion in contributions in (2017), AG2R La Mondiale is the biggest provider of supplementary pensions in France, managing one quarter of employees in the private sector, and the second biggest health insurer (excluding banking groups). The firm has 15 million individual customers and more than 500,000 business customers.

AG2R La Mondiale (along with Decathlon) is a title sponsor of the AG2R La Mondiale cycling team, and sponsors the Transat AG2R sailing race.

== History ==
The company is a fusion of two entities. Those are the AG2R Group, a French-based interprofessional insurance and supplementary retirement fund group, created in 1951 and headquartered in Paris, and the La Mondiale Group, which is a French-based international group for supplementary pension and estate planning insurance, created in 1905 and headquartered in Lille.

In July 2025, AG2R La Mondiale announced it would withdraw from its cycling team, handing over management and sponsorship to Decathlon.
