= Fabio Piscopiello =

Italian cyclist

Personal information
- Born: 16 February 1985 (age 41) Gagliano del Capo, Italy

Cycling career
- Sport: Cycling
- Current team: Retired
- Discipline: Road
- Role: Rider

Professional team
- 2011–2012: De Rosa–Ceramica Flaminia

Fabio Piscopiello (born 16 February 1985) is an Italian former professional road cyclist.

== Major results ==
2008
9th Giro Valli Aretine
2009
1st Stage 5 Girobio
4th Gran Premio Folignano
2010
1st Coppa della Pace
2nd Gran Premio Folignano
9th Trofeo Internazionale Bastianelli
