= POL–Aqua =

Polish cycling team

Team information
- UCI code: PAQ
- Registered: Poland
- Founded: 2008
- Disbanded: 2008
- Discipline: Road
- Status: UCI Women's Team

Team name history
- 2008: POL–Aqua

POL–Aqua (UCI team code: PAQ) was a Polish professional cycling team, which competed in elite road bicycle racing events such as the UCI Women's Road World Cup.

== Major wins ==
2008
Majowy Wyscig Klasyczny – Lublin, Joanna Ignasiak
Stage 3 Wyscig Etapowy – Zamość, Magdalena Zamolska
