= Kamil Gradek =

Polish cyclist (born 1990)

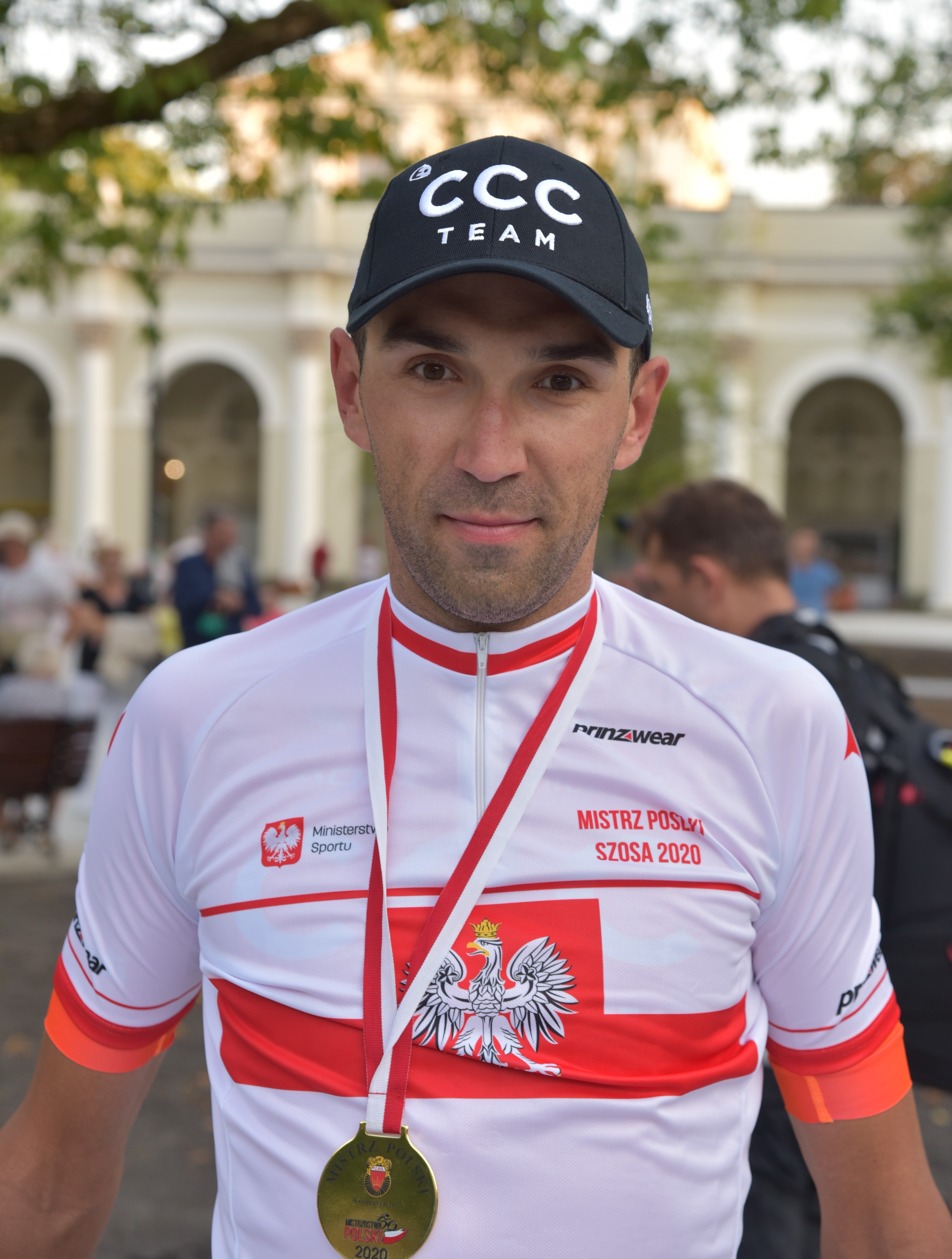
- Gradek in August 2020

Personal information
- Full name: Kamil Gradek
- Born: 17 September 1990 (age 36) Koziegłowy, Silesian Voivodeship, Poland
- Height: 1.94 m (6 ft 4 in)
- Weight: 80 kg (176 lb)

Cycling career
- Sport: Cycling
- Current team: Team Bahrain Victorious
- Discipline: Road
- Role: Rider
- Rider type: Rouleur

Professional teams
- 2013–2014: BDC–Marcpol Team
- 2015–2016: ActiveJet
- 2017: ONE Pro Cycling
- 2018: CCC–Sprandi–Polkowice
- 2019–2020: CCC Team
- 2021: Vini Zabù
- 2022–: Team Bahrain Victorious

Major wins
- One-day races and Classics National Time Trial Championships (2020)

Kamil Gradek (born 17 September 1990) is a Polish racing cyclist, who currently rides for UCI WorldTeam Team Bahrain Victorious. He rode at the 2014 UCI Road World Championships. In May 2019, he was named in the startlist for the 2019 Giro d'Italia.

== Major results ==
2011
1st Time trial, National Under-23 Road Championships
5th Coupe des Carpathes
2012
1st Time trial, National Under-23 Road Championships
2013
2nd Memoriał Henryka Łasaka
7th Overall Szlakiem Grodów Piastowskich
7th Overall Tour of Małopolska
10th GP Sakia El Hamra, Les Challenges de la Marche Verte
2014
1st Overall Tour of China I

1st Stage 3

1st Memoriał Andrzeja Trochanowskiego
2nd Visegrad 4 Bicycle Race – GP Czech Republic
3rd Overall Tour of China II
4th Overall Szlakiem Grodów Piastowskich
4th Overall Course de la Solidarité Olympique

1st Stage 2

5th Visegrad 4 Bicycle Race – GP Hungary
8th Overall Tour of Małopolska
9th Overall Okolo Slovenska
9th Puchar Ministra Obrony Narodowej
2015
2nd Time trial, National Road Championships
2nd Rund um Sebnitz
6th Overall GP Internacional do Guadiana
9th Velothon Stockholm
10th Time trial, European Games
2016
8th Overall Tour of Estonia
10th Overall Dookoła Mazowsza
2017
1st Overall Ronde van Midden-Nederland

1st Stage 1 (TTT)

7th Overall Szlakiem Walk Majora Hubala
2018
1st Stage 3a (TTT) Sibiu Cycling Tour
3rd Overall Szlakiem Walk Majora Hubala
5th Overall Dookoła Mazowsza
6th Visegrad 4 Bicycle Race – GP Slovakia
10th Nokere Koerse
2019
2nd Time trial, National Road Championships
4th Overall Okolo Slovenska
2020
1st Time trial, National Road Championships
2022
2nd Time trial, National Road Championships
2023
3rd Time trial, National Road Championships
2024
2nd Time trial, National Road Championships

=== Grand Tour general classification results timeline ===
Grand Tour	2019	2020	2021	2022	2023	2024	2025	2026
Giro d'Italia	129	104	—	—	—	—	—	—
Tour de France	—	—	—	118	—	—	155	155
Vuelta a España	—	—	—	—	130	133	—	

Legend
—	Did not compete
DNF	Did not finish
IP	In progress
