= Wojciech Ziółkowski =

Polish cyclist

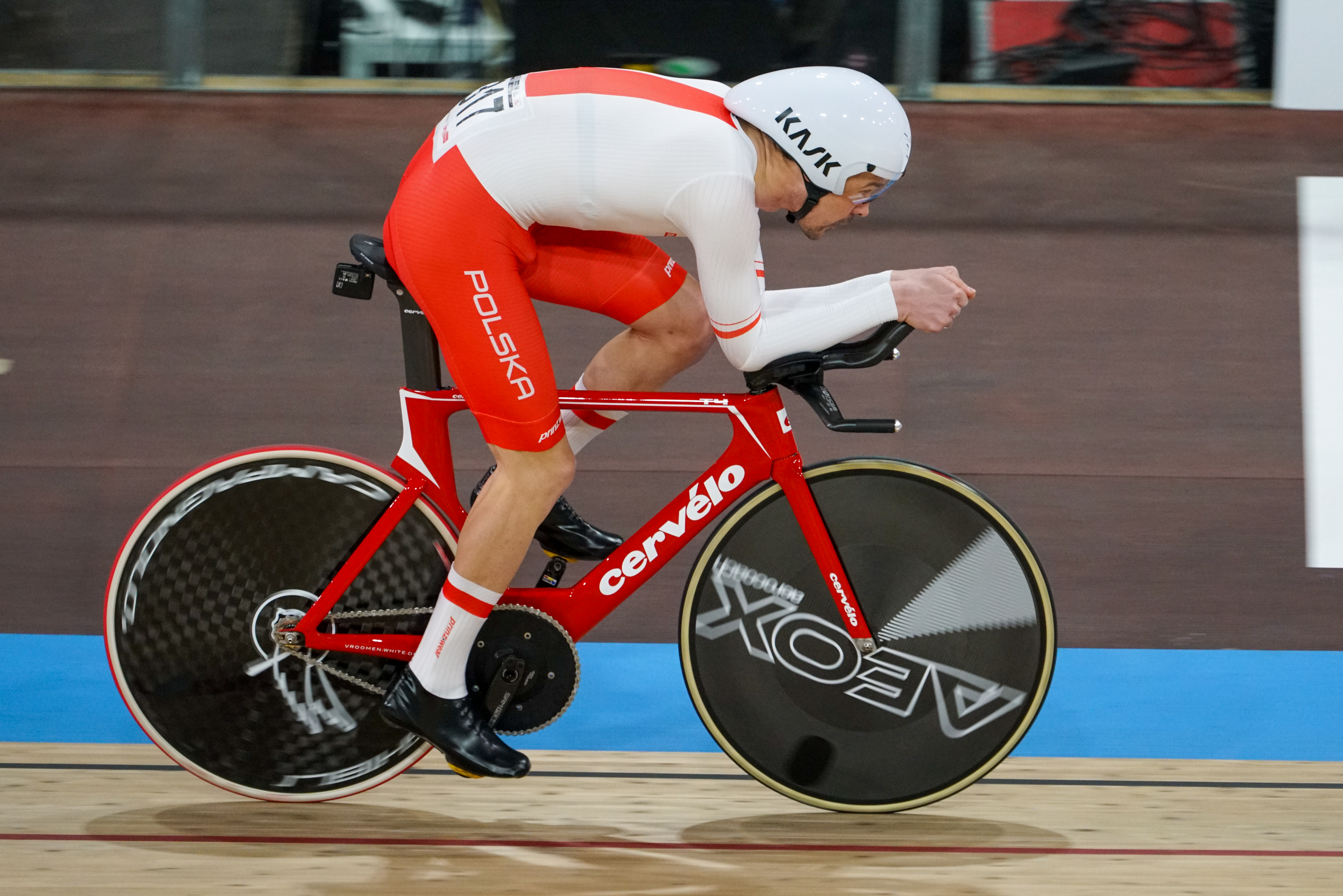
- Wojciech Ziółkowski in 2020

Personal information
- Born: 17 October 1984 (age 41) Polish People's Republic

Cycling career
- Sport: Cycling
- Disciplines: Track; Road
- Role: Rider

Amateur teams
- 2016: De Rosa–Rybnik
- 2018: Domin Sport

Professional teams
- 2004–2005: DHL–Author
- 2007: Weltour
- 2008: Miche–Silver Cross
- 2010: DHL–Author
- 2012: BDC–Marcpol Team

Wojciech Ziółkowski (born 17 October 1984) is a Polish professional racing cyclist. In July 2017, he attempted to break the hour record. Despite failing to set a new world record, he did set a new Polish record of 49.470 km. He rode in the men's individual pursuit event at the 2020 UCI Track Cycling World Championships in Berlin, Germany.

== Major results ==
2007
7th Memoriał Andrzeja Trochanowskiego
2011
3rd Time trial, National Road Championships
10th Overall Dookoła Mazowsza
10th Puchar Ministra Obrony Narodowej
