= Jan Magiera =

Polish cyclist (1938–2022)

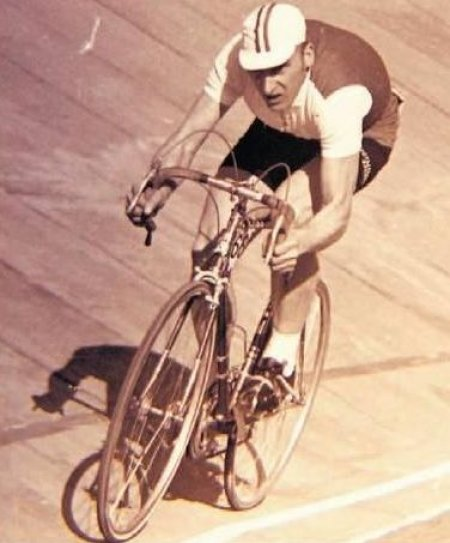

Personal information
- Born: 30 September 1938 Jelna, Poland
- Died: 9 February 2022 (aged 83) Mostki, Poland

Cycling career
- Sport: Cycling

Jan Magiera (30 September 1938 – 9 February 2022) was a Polish cyclist. He competed at the 1964 Summer Olympics and the 1968 Summer Olympics.

He died in Mostki on 9 February 2022, at the age of 83.
