= Grzegorz Zieliński =

Polish physician and researcher (born 1996)

Grzegorz Zielinski
- Grzegorz Zieliński
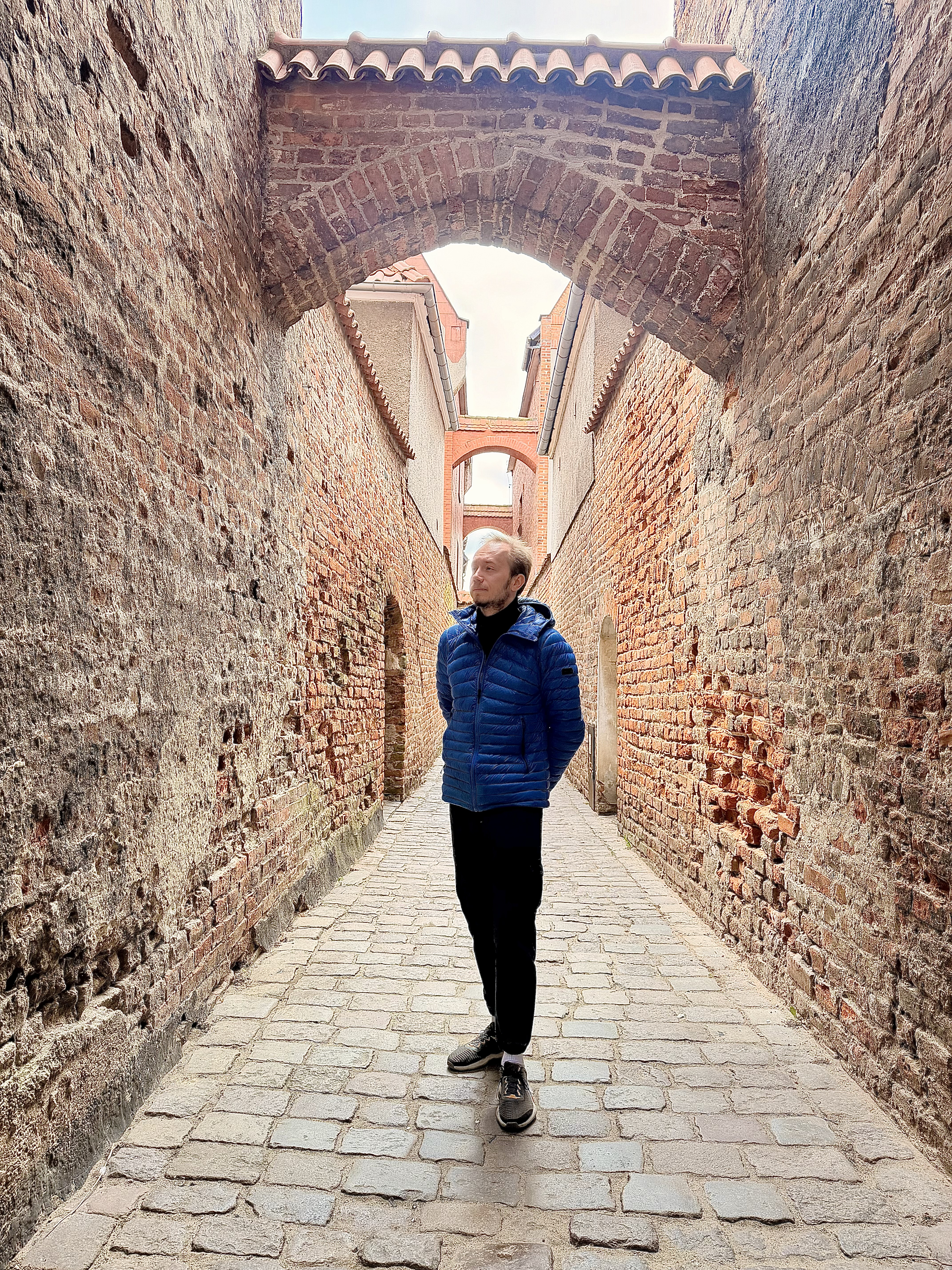
- Born: 1996 (age 29–30)
- Citizenship: Poland
- Education: Medical University of Lublin
- Known for: Research on Bruxism, Temporomandibular Disorders, Epidemiology, Medical Statistics
- Scientific career
- Fields: Physiotherapist, Biostatistician
- Thesis: (2024)

Grzegorz Zieliński (born 1996) is a Polish physiotherapist and researcher whose work includes epidemiology, medical statistics, and research methodology, particularly effect-size analysis and sample-size planning in clinical studies.

== Biography ==
From 2015 to 2020, he studied physiotherapy at the Medical University of Lublin, Poland. In 2024, he defended his doctoral dissertation entitled “Myopia and the Bioelectrical Activity of the Masticatory Muscles”. The dissertation concerned associations between visual impairment and the activity of muscles of the craniofacial system.

From 2021 to 2022, he completed postgraduate Master of Business Administration (MBA) studies at Wyższa Szkoła Biznesu – National-Louis University.

In 2026, he was included in the World’s Top 2% Scientists list of the world's most-cited researchers, compiled by Stanford University and Elsevier.

== Scientific activity ==
He is the author and co-author of scientific publications in the fields of physiotherapy, dentistry, and clinical research methodology. As of 2026, a bibliographic database listed more than 110 publications by Zieliński and an h-index of 21.

=== Research methodology ===
Some of Zieliński's methodological publications have concerned the interpretation of effect sizes and statistical power and sample-size planning in medical research.

In studies concerning pain research, dentistry, and physiotherapy, Zieliński and his co-authors proposed field-specific thresholds for interpreting effect sizes. Some of the proposed thresholds differed from conventional benchmarks associated with Jacob Cohen. A later study by the authors also considered thresholds for odds ratios, relative risk, η², and partial η² in physiotherapy.

=== Epidemiological research ===
Zieliński has co-authored meta-analyses on geographical variation in reported prevalence estimates for disorders of the stomatognathic system, including temporomandibular disorders and bruxism. The studies reported differences between geographical regions and discussed environmental, cultural, and healthcare-related factors as possible contributors to variation in prevalence estimates.

A 2026 study co-authored by Zieliński and Mieszko Więckiewicz reported regional prevalence estimates for oral and facial pain.

Zieliński also co-authored a study that projected future global prevalence of temporomandibular disorders. The study estimated that prevalence could reach approximately 44% by 2050 and discussed demographic and lifestyle factors that might affect future prevalence.

=== Other work ===
Dr. Zieliński is the author of, among others, a textbook on sports medicine (published in Polish). In addition, he served as co-editor of the special issue Bruxism and Temporomandibular Disorders: Current Advances and Future Challenges together with Eiji Tanaka from Japan.

He is named as a co-inventor on a European patent concerning an orthopedic device for cervical spine rehabilitation.

Zieliński has also co-authored publications describing electromyographic indices used to assess masticatory-muscle activity.

== Historical writing ==
Zieliński has also published on historical topics. In a paper marking the centenary of the deaths of George Mallory and Andrew Irvine, he discussed the 1924 British Mount Everest expedition and the question of whether the climbers reached the summit before their deaths.

He is also the author of two historical books published in Polish.
