= Arena Pruszków =

Velodrome in Pruszków, Poland

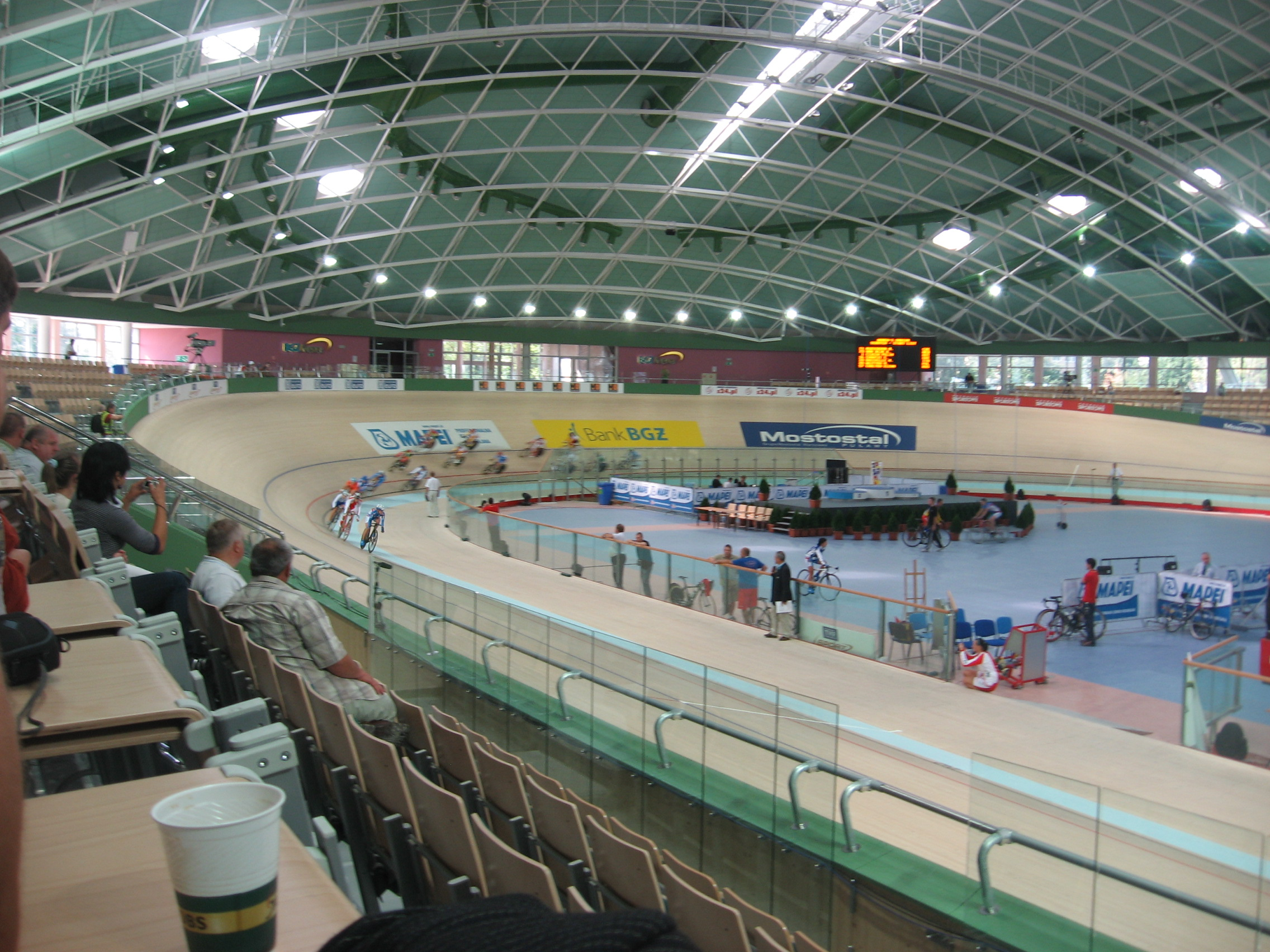
- The track during the 2008 European Track Championships
- Interactive map of Arena Pruszków
- Full name: BGŻ BNP Paribas Arena
- Location: Pruszków, Poland
- Coordinates: 52°9′49″N 20°49′19″E
- Owner: Polish Cycling Federation
- Operator: Arena Pruszków Sp. z.o.o.
- Capacity: 1800
- Surface: Siberian pine
- Field size: 250m track length

Construction
- Groundbreaking: 2003
- Built: 2003-2008
- Opened: 2008
- Architect: Wojciech Zabłocki
- Main contractor: Mostostal Puławy

Tenant
- Poland national track cycling teams

The Arena Pruszków, known until 2017 as BGŻ BNP Paribas Arena for sponsorship reasons, is a velodrome in Pruszków, Poland. Opened in 2008 as Poland's first indoor velodrome, it hosted the 2009 UCI Track Cycling World Championships. It also hosted the 2008 European Track Championships at under-23 and junior level and the 2010 European Track Championships at elite level.

The track is 250 metres (820 ft) long and made of Siberian Pine. It has seats for 1800 people with the capacity to install 1500 more seats. The BGŻ Arena is also home of the Polish Cycling Federation.

== See also ==
- List of cycling tracks and velodromes

| Preceded by Manchester Velodrome; Manchester | UCI Track Cycling World Championships; Venue; 2009 | Succeeded by Ballerup Super Arena; Ballerup, Copenhagen |
| Preceded by Omnisport Apeldoorn; Apeldoorn | UCI Track Cycling World Championships; Venue; 2019 | Succeeded by Velodrom; Berlin |
| Preceded by Inaugural championships | European Track Championships (Elite); Venue; 2010 | Succeeded by Omnisport Apeldoorn; Apeldoorn |
