= Gianluca Maggiore =

Italian cyclist

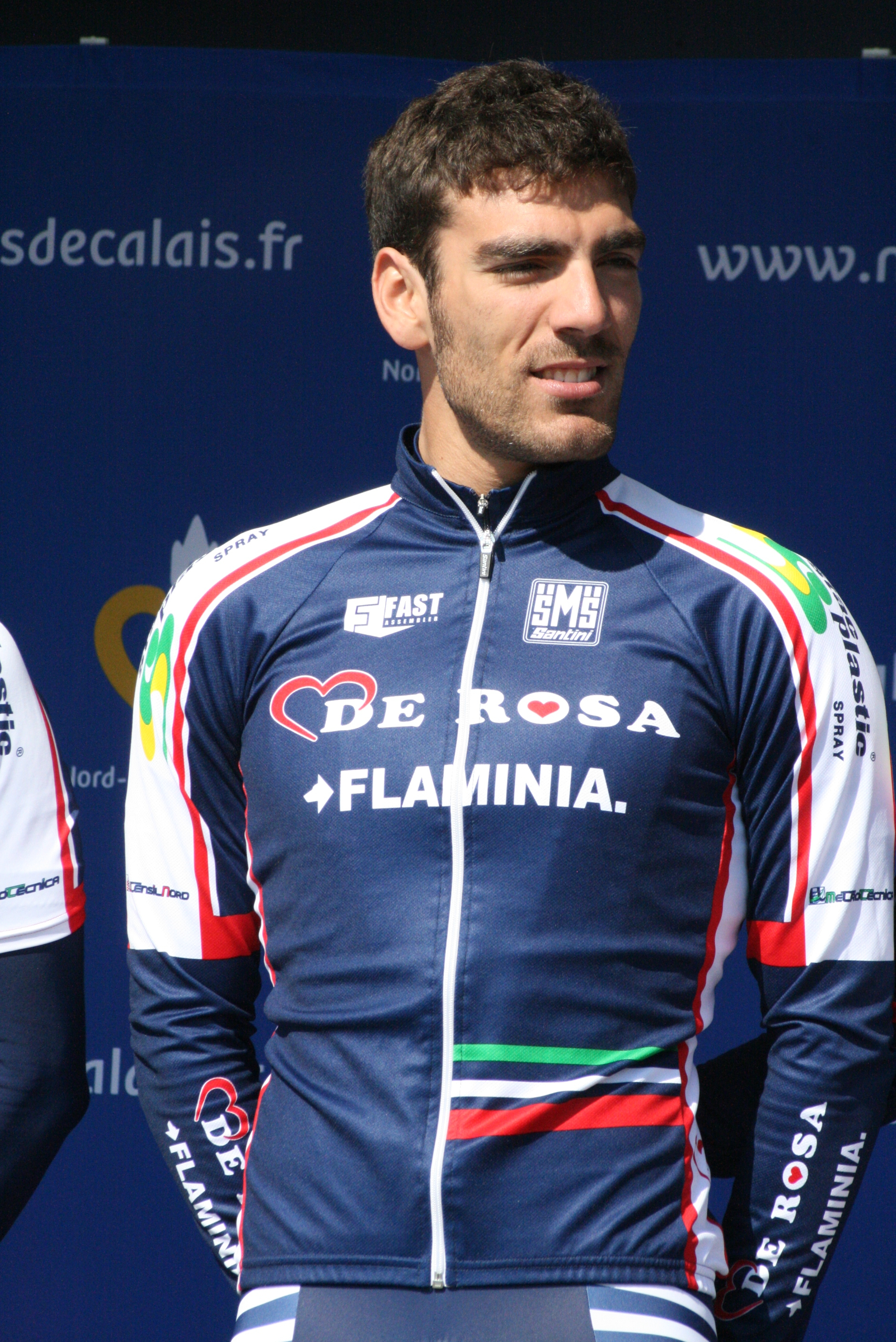
- Gianluca Maggiore in 2011

Personal information
- Born: 21 February 1985 (age 41) Naples, Italy

Cycling career
- Sport: Cycling
- Current team: Retired
- Discipline: Road
- Role: Rider

Amateur team
- 2009–2010: Casati NGC Perrel

Professional team
- 2011–2012: De Rosa–Ceramica Flaminia

Gianluca Maggiore (born 21 February 1985) is an Italian former racing cyclist.

== Major results ==
2008
7th Coppa Caivano
2009
3rd Coppa Colli Briantei Internazionale
2012
10th Giro del Veneto
