= Polish Cycling Federation =

National governing body of cycle racing in Poland

- Sport: Cycle racing
- Abbreviation: PZKol
- Founded: 1920
- Affiliation: UCI
- Affiliation date: 1921
- Regional affiliation: UEC
- President: Marek Leśniewski

Official website
- www.pzkol.pl
- (Poland)

The Polish Cycling Federation or PZKol (in Polish: Polski Związek Kolarski) is the national governing body of cycle racing in Poland.

The PZKol is a member of the UCI and the UEC. It is based at the BGŻ Arena in Pruszków.

== See also ==
- Polish records in track cycling
