= Marek Leśniewski =

Polish cyclist

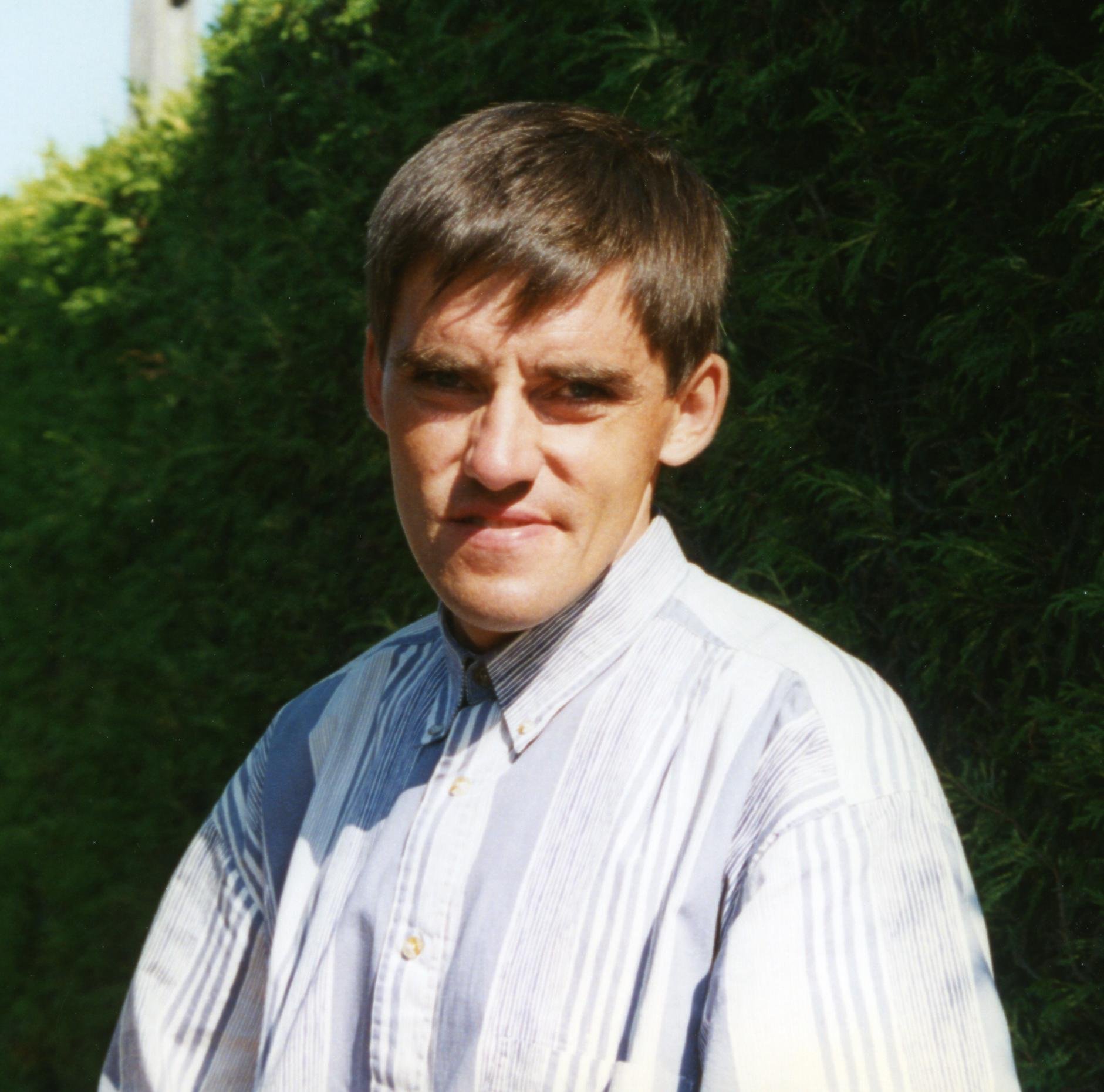
- Lesniewski in 1996

Personal information
- Born: 24 April 1964 (age 62) Bydgoszcz, Poland

Cycling career
- Sport: Cycling
- Current team: Retired
- Discipline: Road

Professional team
- 1994–1997: Aubervilliers 93
Medal record
Men's cycling
Representing Poland
Olympic Games
Silver medal – second place	1988 Seoul	Time Trial

Marek Leśniewski (born 24 April 1963) is a Polish former racing cyclist. He won the silver medal in the team time trial at the 1988 Summer Olympics along with Andrzej Sypytkowski, Joachim Halupczok and Zenon Jaskuła. He won the Tour de Pologne 1985.
