= 2006–07 UCI Europe Tour =

Third season of the UCI Europe Tour

- Third edition of the UCI Europe Tour

Details
- Dates: 15 October 2006–18 October 2007
- Location: Europe
- Races: About 300+

Champions
- Individual champion: Alessandro Bertolini (ITA) (Diquigiovanni–Selle Italia)
- Teams' champion: Rabobank
- Nations' champion: Italy

The 2006–07 UCI Europe Tour was the third season of the UCI Europe Tour. The season began on 15 October 2006 with the Chrono des Nations and ended on 18 October 2007 with the Giro del Piemonte.

The points leader, based on the cumulative results of previous races, wears the UCI Europe Tour cycling jersey. Niko Eeckhout of Belgium was the defending champion of the 2005–06 UCI Europe Tour. Alessandro Bertolini of Italy was crowned as the 2006–07 UCI Europe Tour.

Throughout the season, points are awarded to the top finishers of stages within stage races and the final general classification standings of each of the stages races and one-day events. The quality and complexity of a race also determines how many points are awarded to the top finishers, the higher the UCI rating of a race, the more points are awarded.

The UCI ratings from highest to lowest are as follows:

- Multi-day events: 2.HC, 2.1 and 2.2
- One-day events: 1.HC, 1.1 and 1.2

== Events ==
=== 2006 ===
Date	Race name	Location	UCI Rating	Winner	Team
15 October	Chrono des Nations	France	1.1	Raivis Belohvoščiks (LAT)	Universal Caffè
17 October	Nationale Sluitingsprijs	Belgium	1.1	Gorik Gardeyn (BEL)	Unibet.com

=== 2007 ===
Date	Race name	Location	UCI Rating	Winner	Team
6 February	Grand Prix d'Ouverture La Marseillaise	France	1.1	Jeremy Hunt (GBR)	Unibet.com
7–11 February	Étoile de Bessèges	France	2.1	Nick Nuyens (BEL)	Cofidis
10 February	GP della Costa Etruschi	Italy	1.1	Alessandro Petacchi (ITA)	Team Milram
11 February	Vuelta a Mallorca	Spain	1.1	Óscar Freire (ESP)	Rabobank
12 February	Trofeo Cala Millor-Cala Bona	Spain	1.1	Vicente Reynés (ESP)	Caisse d'Épargne
13 February	Trofeo Pollença	Spain	1.1	Thomas Dekker (NED)	Rabobank
14 February	Trofeo Sóller	Spain	1.1	Antonio Colom (ESP)	Astana
14–18 February	Tour Méditerranéen	France	2.1	Iván Gutiérrez (ESP)	Caisse d'Epargne
15 February	Trofeo Calvià	Spain	1.1	Unai Etxebarría (ESP)	Euskaltel–Euskadi
18–22 February	Vuelta a Andalucía	Spain	2.1	Óscar Freire (ESP)	Rabobank
20 February	Trofeo Laigueglia	Italy	1.1	Mikhail Ignatiev (RUS)	Tinkoff Credit Systems
21–25 February	Volta ao Algarve	Portugal	2.1	Alessandro Petacchi (ITA)	Team Milram
24 February	Coppa San Geo	Italy	1.2	Hrvoje Miholjević (CRO)	B.K. Loborika
25 February	Tour du Haut Var	France	1.1	Filippo Pozzato (ITA)	Liquigas
27 February–3 March	Volta a la Comunitat Valenciana	Spain	2.1	Alejandro Valverde (ESP)	Caisse d'Epargne
2–4 March	Driedaagse van West-Vlaanderen	France	2.2	Sébastien Turgot (FRA)	Vendée U
3 March	Beverbeek Classic	Belgium	1.2	Nico Sijmens (BEL)	Landbouwkrediet–Tönissteiner
3 March	Gran Premio di Chiasso	Switzerland	1.1	Pavel Brutt (RUS)	Tinkoff Credit Systems
3 March	Omloop "Het Volk"	Belgium	1.HC	Filippo Pozzato (ITA)	Liquigas
4 March	Clásica de Almería	Spain	1.1	Giuseppe Muraglia (ITA)	Acqua & Sapone–Caffè Mokambo
4 March	Gran Premio di Lugano	Switzerland	1.1	Luca Mazzanti (ITA)	Ceramica Panaria–Navigare
4 March	Kuurne–Brussels–Kuurne	Belgium	1.1	Tom Boonen (BEL)	Quick-Step–Innergetic
4 March	Trofeo Zssdi	Italy	1.2	Simone Ponzi (ITA)	GS Zalf Désirée Fior
7 March	Le Samyn	Belgium	1.1	Jimmy Casper (FRA)	Unibet.com
7–11 March	Vuelta a Murcia	Spain	2.1	Alejandro Valverde (ESP)	Caisse d'Epargne
9–11 March	Record Driedaagse van West-Vlaanderen	Belgium	2.1	Jimmy Casper (FRA)	Unibet.com
10 March	De Vlaamse Pijl	Belgium	1.2	Jelle Vanendert (BEL)	Chocolade Jacques–Topsport Vlaanderen
10 March	Milano–Torino	Italy	1.HC	Danilo Di Luca (ITA)	Liquigas
11 March	Grand Prix de la Ville de Lillers	France	1.2	Benoît Daeninck (FRA)	UV Aube
11 March	Poreč Trophy	Croatia	1.2	Marko Kump (SLO)	Adria Mobil
11 March	Trofeo Franco Balestra	Italy	1.2	Simone Ponzi (ITA)	GS Zalf Désirée Fior
15–18 March	Istrian Spring Trophy	Croatia	2.2	Edvald Boasson Hagen (NOR)	Maxbo Bianchi
15–18 March	Volta ao Distrito de Santarém	Portugal	2.1	Robert Hunter (RSA)	Barloworld
18 March	Omloop van het Waasland	Belgium	1.2	Niko Eeckhout (BEL)	Liquigas
18 March	Giro del Mendrisiotto	Switzerland	1.2	Andreas Dietziker (SUI)	Team LPR
18 March	Gran Premio San Giuseppe	Italy	1.2	Andrei Solomennikov (RUS)	Russia (national team)
18 March	Paris–Troyes	France	1.2	Yury Trofimov (RUS)	Moscow Stars
21 March	Nokere Koerse	Belgium	1.1	Léon van Bon (NED)	Rabobank
21–24 March	The Paths of King Nikola	Montenegro	2.2	Mitja Mahorič (SLO)	Perutnina Ptuj
23 March	Classic Loire-Atlantique	France	1.2	Nicolas Jalabert (FRA)	Agritubel
25 March	Cholet-Pays de Loire	France	1.1	Stéphane Augé (FRA)	Cofidis
25 March	La Roue Tourangelle	France	1.2	Yury Trofimov (RUS)	Moscow Stars
25 March	Ronde van het Groene Hart	Netherlands	1.1	Wouter Weylandt (BEL)	Quick-Step–Innergetic
26–30 March	Vuelta a Castilla y León	Spain	2.1	Alberto Contador (ESP)	Discovery Channel
26 March–1 April	Tour de Normandie	France	2.2	Martijn Maaskant (NED)	Rabobank Continental Team
27–31 March	Settimana Ciclistica Internazionale	Italy	2.1	Michele Scarponi (ITA)	Acqua & Sapone–Caffè Mokambo
28 March	Dwars door Vlaanderen	Belgium	1.1	Tom Boonen (BEL)	Quick-Step–Innergetic
28 March	Grand Prix de Waregem	Belgium	1.2U	Enrico Montanari (ITA)	Finauto Lucchini Neri
30 March–1 April	Grand Prix du Portugal	Portugal	2.Ncup	Vitor Rodrigues (POR)	Portugal (national team)
31 March	E3 Prijs Vlaanderen	Belgium	1.HC	Tom Boonen (BEL)	Quick-Step–Innergetic
31 March–1 April	Critérium International	France	2.HC	Jens Voigt (GER)	Team CSC
1 April	Brabantse Pijl	Belgium	1.1	Óscar Freire (ESP)	Rabobank
1 April	Trofeo Banca Popolare di Vicenza	Italy	1.2U	Manuel Belletti (ITA)	U.C. Trevigiani–Dynamon
3–5 April	Three Days of De Panne	Belgium	2.HC	Alessandro Ballan (ITA)	Lampre–Fondital
5–9 April	Settimana Ciclistica Lombarda	Italy	2.1	Alexander Efimkin (RUS)	Barloworld
6 April	Route Adélie de Vitré	France	1.1	Rémi Pauriol (FRA)	Crédit Agricole
7 April	GP Miguel Induráin	Spain	1.HC	Rinaldo Nocentini (ITA)	AG2R Prévoyance
7 April	Hel van Het Mergelland	Netherlands	1.1	Nico Sijmens (BEL)	Landbouwkrediet–Tönissteiner
7 April	Boucle de l'Artois	France	1.2	Andrey Klyuev (RUS)	Moscow Stars
7–9 April	Le Triptyque des Monts et Châteaux	Italy	2.2	Tom Leezer (NED)	Rabobank Continental Team
8 April	Grand Prix de Rennes	France	1.1	Sergiy Matveyev (UKR)	Ceramica Panaria–Navigare
8 April	Grand Prix de la ville de Nogent-sur-Oise	France	1.2	Mateusz Mróz (POL)	CCC–Polsat–Polkowice
9 April	Giro del Belvedere	Italy	1.2	Simone Stortoni (ITA)	Finauto Lucchini Neri
9 April	Rund um Köln	Germany	1.HC	Juan José Haedo (ARG)	Team CSC
10 April	Gran Premio Palio del Recioto	Italy	1.2U	Robert Kišerlovski (CRO)	Adria Mobil
10–13 April	Circuit Cycliste Sarthe	France	2.1	Andreas Klöden (GER)	Astana
11–15 April	Volta ao Alentejo	Portugal	2.1	Manuel Vázquez (ESP)	Andalucía–CajaSur
12 April	Grand Prix Pino Cerami	Belgium	1.1	Luca Solari (ITA)	Team L.P.R.
13–15 April	Circuit des Ardennes	France	2.1	Jérôme Coppel (FRA)	CR 4 Chemins Roanne
14 April	Profronde van Drenthe	Netherlands	1.1	Martijn Maaskant (NED)	Rabobank Continental
15 April	Klasika Primavera	Spain	1.1	Joaquim Rodríguez (ESP)	Caisse d'Epargne
17 April	Paris–Camembert	France	1.1	Sébastien Joly (FRA)	Française des Jeux
18 April	Scheldeprijs	Belgium	1.HC	Mark Cavendish (GBR)	T-Mobile Team
18 April	La Côte Picarde	France	1.Ncup	Simon Špilak (SLO)	Slovenia (national team)
18–21 April	Tour du Loir-et-Cher	France	2.2	Alexandre Blain (FRA)	AVC Aix-en-Provence
18–22 April	Vuelta a Mallorca	Spain	2.2	Richard Faltus (CZE)	Sparkasse
19 April	Grand Prix de Denain	France	1.1	Sébastien Chavanel (FRA)	Française des Jeux
19–22 April	Giro d'Abruzzo	Italy	2.2	Luca Ascani (ITA)	Aurum Hotels
19–22 April	Rhône-Alpes Isère Tour	France	2.2	Gabriel Rasch (NOR)	Maxbo Bianchi
20 April	Belgrade–Banja Luka I	France	1.1	Matej Gnezda (SLO)	Radenska Powerbar
21 April	Belgrade–Banja Luka II	France	1.1	Zsolt Dér (SRB)	P-Nívó Betonexpressz 2000 Kft.se
21 April	Liège–Bastogne–Liège Espoirs	Belgium	1.Ncup	Grega Bole (SLO)	Sava
21 April	Tour du Finistère	France	1.1	Niels Brouzes (FRA)	Auber 93
21–25 April	Grand Prix de Sochi	Russia	2.2	Alexey Shmidt (RUS)	Moscow Stars
22 April	Giro d'Oro	Italy	1.1	Dainius Kairelis (LTU)	Amore & Vita–McDonald's
22 April	Tro-Bro Léon	France	1.1	Saïd Haddou (FRA)	Bouygues Télécom
22 April	Tour de Hollande-Septentrionale	Netherlands	1.2	Kenny van Hummel (NED)	Skil–Shimano
22 April	Rund um Düren	Germany	1.2	Marcel Beima (NED)	Time-Van Hemert
24–27 April	Giro del Trentino	Italy	2.1	Damiano Cunego (ITA)	Lampre–Fondital
25 April	Gran Premio della Liberazione	Italy	1.2U	Manuele Boaro (ITA)	GS Zalf Désirée Fior
25 April	Gran Premio della Liberazione	Italy	1.2U	Manuele Boaro (ITA)	GS Zalf Désirée Fior
25–29 April	Tour d'Extremadure	Spain	2.2	Nuño Marta (POL)	Madeinox-Bric-Loulé
25–29 April	Internationale Niedersachsen-Rundfahrt	Germany	2.1	Alessandro Petacchi (ITA)	Team Milram
25 April–1 May	Tour de Bretagne	France	2.2	Lars Boom (NED)	Rabobank Continental Team
26 April–1 May	Giro delle Regioni	Italy	2.Ncup	Rui Costa (POR)	Benfica
27–29 April	Vuelta a La Rioja	Spain	2.1	Rubén Plaza (ESP)	Caisse d'Epargne
29 April	Paris–Mantes-en-Yvelines Espoirs	France	1.2	Niels Brouzes (FRA)	Auber 93
29 April	East Midlands International Cicle Classic	United Kingdom	1.2	Malcolm Elliott (GBR)	Pinarello Racing Team
29 April	Ronde Van Vlaanderen Beloften	Belgium	1.2U	Alexandre Pliușchin (MDA)	Chambéry Cyclisme Formation
1 May	Grand Prix du 1er mai – Prix d'honneur Vic De Bruyne	Belgium	1.2	Wouter Mol (NED)	P3 Transfer–Fondas
1 May	Memoriał Andrzeja Trochanowskiego	Poland	1.2	Tomasz Lisowicz (POL)	CCC–Polsat–Polkowice
1 May	Rund um den Henninger-Turm	Germany	1.HC	Patrik Sinkewitz (GER)	T-Mobile Team
1 May	Subida al Naranco	Spain	1.1	Koldo Gil (ESP)	Saunier Duval–Prodir
1 May	Tour de Vendée	France	1.1	Mikel Gaztañaga (ESP)	Agritubel
2 May	Grand Prix of Moscow	Russia	1.2	Roman Klimov (RUS)	
3 May	Mayor Cup	Russia	1.2	Denis Galimzyanov (RUS)	
3–7 May	Vuelta a Asturias	Spain	2.1	Koldo Gil (ESP)	Saunier Duval–Prodir
4–6 May	Szlakiem Grodów Piastowskich	Poland	2.1	Tomasz Kiendyś (POL)	CCC–Polsat–Polkowice
5 May	GP Herning	Denmark	1.1	Kurt Asle Arvesen (NOR)	Team CSC
5 May	GP Industria & Artigianato di Larciano	Italy	1.1	Vincenzo Nibali (ITA)	Liquigas
5 May	Ronde van Overijssel	Netherlands	1.2	Marco Bos (NED)	Jo Piels
5–9 May	Five Rings of Moscow	Russia	2.2	Aliaksandr Kuchynski (BLR)	Liquigas
6 May	Circuito del Porto-Trofeo Arvedi	Italy	1.2	Jacopo Guarnieri (ITA)	Marchiol Ima Liquigas
6 May	Omloop der Kempen	Netherlands	1.2	Lars Boom (NED)	Rabobank Continental Team
6 May	Colliers Classic	Denmark	1.1	Juan José Haedo (ARG)	Team CSC
6 May	Giro di Toscana	Italy	1.1	Vincenzo Nibali (ITA)	Liquigas
6–13 May	Presidential Cycling Tour of Turkey	Turkey	2.2	Ivaïlo Gabrovski (BUL)	Velo-M-Hemus-Makedonya
8 May	Coppa Città di Asti	Italy	1.2U	Tony Martin (GER)	Thüringer Energie
8–13 May	Four Days of Dunkirk	France	2.HC	Mathieu Ladagnous (FRA)	Française des Jeux
9–13 May	Giro del Friuli Venezia Giulia	Italy	2.2	Aleksandr Filippov (RUS)	A.C.S. Gruppo Lupi
11 May	Memorial Oleg Dyachenko	Russia	1.2	Sergey Firsanov (RUS)	Rietumu Banka–Riga–Ideal
11–13 May	Tour du Haut-Anjou	France	2.2	Martijn Keizer (NED)	Rabobank Continental Team
12–13 May	Clásica Internacional a Alcobendas y Collado Villalba	Spain	2.1	Luis Pérez Rodríguez (ESP)	Andalucía–CajaSur
12–20 May	Olympia's Tour	Netherlands	2.2	Thomas Berkhout (NED)	Rabobank Continental Team
13 May	Gran Premio Industrie del Marmo	Italy	1.2	Anton Rechetnikov (RUS)	Russia (national team)
16–20 May	Flèche du Sud	Luxembourg	2.2	Boris Shpilevsky (RUS)	Kio Ene–Tonazzi–DMT
16–20 May	Rheinland-Pfalz Rundfahrt	Germany	2.1	Gerald Ciolek (GER)	T-Mobile Team
17 May	Trophée des Grimpeurs – Polymultipliée	France	1.1	Anthony Geslin (FRA)	Bouygues Télécom
17–20 May	GP Internacional Paredes Rota dos Móveis	Portugal	2.1	David Blanco Rodríguez (ESP)	Duja–Tavira
18–20 May	Tour de Picardie	France	2.1	Robert Hunter (RSA)	Barloworld
19 May	Belgrade–Čačak	Serbia	1.2	Matija Kvasina (CRO)	Perutnina Ptuj
20–27 May	Rás Tailteann	Ireland	2.2	Tony Martin (GER)	Thüringer Energie
23–27 May	Circuit de Lorraine Professionnels	France	2.1	Jörg Jaksche (GER)	Tinkoff Credit Systems
24–27 May	Ronde de l'Isard d'Ariège	France	2.2U	John Devine (USA)	United States (national team)
25 May	Grand Prix Hydraulika Mikolasek	Slovakia	1.2	Marcin Sapa (POL)	DHL–Author
25–28 May	Tour de Berlin	Germany	2.2U	Michael Franzl (GER)	Team Mapei Heizomat Bayern
26 May	Clásica Memorial Txuma	Spain	1.2	Boris Shpilevsky (RUS)	Kio Ene–Tonazzi–DMT
26 May	Grand Prix Kooperativa	Slovakia	1.2	Kristjan Fajt (SLO)	Radenska Powerbar
26 May	Tartu GP	Estonia	1.2	Erki Pütsep (EST)	Bouygues Télécom
26 May	Giro di Festina	Austria	1.2	Markus Eibegger (AUT)	Elk Haus-Simplon
27 May	Grand Prix Palma	Slovakia	1.2	Petr Benčík (CZE)	PSK Whirlpool
28 May	Neuseen Classics – Rund um die Braunkohle	Germany	1.1	Denis Flahaut (FRA)	Jartazi Promo Fashion
29 May–3 June	Vuelta Ciclista a Navarra	Spain	2.2	Maurizio Biondo (ITA)	Kio Ene–Tonazzi–DMT
30 May–3 June	Ringerike GP	Norway	2.2	Edvald Boasson Hagen (NOR)	Maxbo Bianchi
30 May–3 June	Tour of Belgium	Belgium	2.1	Vladimir Gusev (RUS)	Discovery Channel
30 May–3 June	Bayern Rundfahrt	Germany	2.HC	Stefan Schumacher (GER)	Gerolsteiner
31 May–3 June	Tour de Gironde	France	2.2	Jonathan Thiré (FRA)	Team UC Nantes Atlantique
1 June	E.O.S Tallinn GP	Estonia	1.1	Erki Pütsep (EST)	Estonia (national team)
2 June	Trofeo Alcide Degasperi	Italy	1.2	Jacopo Guarnieri (ITA)	Marchiol Ima Liquigas
2 June	Grand Prix de Plumelec-Morbihan	France	1.1	Simon Gerrans (AUS)	AG2R Prévoyance
2 June	GP Kranj	Slovenia	1.1	Borut Božič (SLO)	Team L.P.R.
3 June	Coppa della Pace	Italy	1.2	Marco Cattaneo (ITA)	SC Pagnoncelli NGC Perrel
3 June	Riga Grand Prix	Latvia	1.2	Gatis Smukulis (LAT)	Latvia (national team)
3 June	Paris–Roubaix Espoirs	France	1.2U	Damien Gaudin (FRA)	Vendée U
3 June	Boucles de l'Aulne	France	1.1	Romain Feillu (FRA)	Agritubel
3 June	GP Llodio	Spain	1.1	David de la Fuente (ESP)	Saunier Duval–Prodir
4–9 June	Volta a Lleida	Spain	2.2	Francis De Greef (BEL)	Davitamon–Win for Life
5–10 June	Bałtyk–Karkonosze Tour	Poland	2.2	Roman Broniš (SVK)	DHL–Author
6–10 June	Tour de Luxembourg	Luxembourg	2.HC	Grégory Rast (SUI)	Astana
8–10 June	Euskal Bizikleta	Spain	2.HC	Constantino Zaballa (ESP)	Caisse d'Epargne
9 June	GP Triberg-Schwarzwald	Germany	1.1	Radoslav Rogina (CRO)	Perutnina Ptuj
9 June	Memorial Marco Pantani – Trofeo Mercatone Uno	Italy	1.1	Franco Pellizotti (ITA)	Liquigas
9–10 June	OZ Wielerweekend	Netherlands	2.2	Tom Veelers (NED)	Rabobank Continental Team
10 June	Grand Prix of Aargau Canton	Switzerland	1.HC	John Gadret (FRA)	AG2R Prévoyance
10 June	Memorial Philippe Van Coningsloo	Belgium	1.2	Frederiek Nolf (BEL)	Wielergroep Beveren 200
12–16 June	Tour of Slovenia	Slovenia	2.1	Tomaž Nose (SLO)	Adria Mobil
12–17 June	Thüringen Rundfahrt	Germany	2.2U	Mathias Frank (SUI)	Schweiz
13 June	Veenendaal–Veenendaal	Netherlands	1.HC	Steffen Radochla (GER)	Team Wiesenhof–Felt
13–19 June	Circuito Montañés	Spain	2.2	Bauke Mollema (NED)	Rabobank Continental Team
14–17 June	Ronde de l'Oise	France	2.2	Fredrik Johansson (SWE)	Designa Køkken
14–17 June	GP Internacional CTT Correios de Portugal	Portugal	2.1	Pedro Cardoso (POR)	LA–MSS
16 June	Delta Profronde	Netherlands	1.1	Denis Flahaut (FRA)	Jartazi Promo Fashion
18–24 June	Tour de Serbie	Serbia	2.2	Matej Stare (SLO)	Perutnina Ptuj
19–23 June	Ster Elektrotoer	Netherlands	2.1	Sebastian Langeveld (NED)	Rabobank Continental Team
21–23 June	Tour de Mainfranken	Germany	2.2	Anatoli Kaschtan (UKR)	Ukraine (national team)
21–24 June	Boucles de la Mayenne	France	2.2	Nicolas Vogondy (FRA)	Agritubel
21–24 June	Route du Sud	France	2.1	Óscar Sevilla (ESP)	Relax–GAM Fuenlabrada
24 June	Kärnten Viper Grand Prix	Austria	1.2	Martin Riška (SVK)	Swiag
27 June	Internationale Wielertrofee Jong Maar Moedig	Belgium	1.2	Sven Nys (BEL)	Rabobank Continental Team
27 June	Halle–Ingooigem	Belgium	1.1	Janek Tombak (EST)	Jartazi Promo Fashion
27 June	Profronde van Friesland	Netherlands	1.1	Maarten den Bakker (NED)	Skil–Shimano
3 July	Trofeo Città di Brescia	Italy	1.2	Luca Gasparini (ITA)	SC Pagnoncelli NGC Perrel
4 July	Grote Prijs Gerrie Knetemann	Netherlands	1.1	Olivier Kaisen (BEL)	Predictor–Lotto
4–8 July	Course de la Solidarité Olympique	Poland	2.1	Łukasz Bodnar (POL)	Intel–Action
7 July	Tour du Jura	Switzerland	1.2	Guillaume Levarlet (FRA)	Auber 93
7 July	Grand Prix Bradlo	Slovakia	1.2U	Maciej Bodnar (POL)	Poland (national team)
8 July	De Drie Zustersteden – Willebroek	Belgium	1.2	Bert De Waele (BEL)	Landbouwkrediet–Tönissteiner
8 July	Giro del Medio Brenta	Italy	1.2	Adriano Angeloni (ITA)	Ceramica Flaminia
8 July	Tour du Doubs	France	1.1	Vincent Jérôme (FRA)	Bouygues Télécom
8–15 July	Tour of Austria	Austria	2.HC	Stijn Devolder (BEL)	Discovery Channel
11–14 July	Gemenci Nagydíj	Hungary	2.2	Sander Oostlander (NED)	Team Löwik Meubelen
11–15 July	GP Internacional Torres Vedras	Portugal	2.1	Xavier Tondo (ESP)	LA–MSS
14 July	Cronoscalata Gardone V.T. – Prati di Caregno	Italy	1.2	Bruno Rizzi (ITA)	SC Pagnoncelli NGC Perrel
15 July	Coppa Colli Briantei Internazionale	Italy	1.2	Emanuele Moschen (ITA)	A.S.D. Unidelta Bottoli Arvedi
15 July	Grand Prix de Dourges-Hénin-Beaumont	France	1.2	Martin Mortensen (DEN)	Designa Køkken
15 July	Pomorski Klasyk	Poland	1.2	Marcin Sapa (POL)	DHL–Author
15–24 July	Way to Pekin	Russia	2.2	Alexey Kunshin (RUS)	
18–22 July	Tour de Madrid	Spain	2.2	Manuel Lloret (ESP)	Fuerteventura–Canarias
20 July	European Road Championships (U23) – Time Trial	Bulgaria	CC	Maxim Belkov (RUS)	Russia (national team)
21 July	Giro delle Valli Aretine	Italy	1.2	Davide Malacarne (ITA)	GS Zalf Désirée Fior
21 July	Grand Prix Cristal Energie	France	1.2	Florian Morizot (FRA)	Auber 93
22 July	European Road Championships (U23) – Road Race	Bulgaria	CC	Andrey Klyuev (RUS)	Russia (national team)
22 July	Giro del Casentino	Italy	1.2	Francesco Ginanni (ITA)	Finauto-Neri
24–28 July	Dookoła Mazowsza	Poland	2.2	Joost Posthuma (POL)	CCC–Polsat–Polkowice
25 July	Prueba Villafranca de Ordizia	Spain	1.1	Joaquim Rodríguez (ESP)	Caisse d'Epargne
25–29 July	Sachsen Tour	Germany	2.1	Joost Posthuma (NED)	Rabobank
26 July	Internatie	Belgium	1.2	Iljo Keisse (BEL)	Chocolade Jacques–Topsport Vlaanderen
26–29 July	Brixia Tour	Italy	2.1	Davide Rebellin (ITA)	Gerolsteiner
28 July–1 August	Tour de Wallonie	Belgium	2.HC	Borut Božič (SLO)	Team L.P.R.
29 July	GP de Pérenchies	France	1.2	Peter Ronsse (BEL)	Babes Only–Villapark
29 July	Gran Premio Inda	Italy	1.2	Bruno Rizzi (ITA)	SC Pagnoncelli NGC Perrel
31 July	Circuito de Getxo	Spain	1.1	Vicente Reynés (ESP)	Caisse d'Epargne
1–5 August	Tour Alsace	France	2.2	Benoît Luminet (FRA)	C.R.4 Chemins Roanne
1–5 August	Tour de León	Spain	2.2	Miyataka Shimizu (JPN)	Nippo Corporation–Meitan Hompo
1–5 August	Danmark Rundt	Denmark	2.HC	Kurt Asle Arvesen (NOR)	Team CSC
2–4 August	Tour of Małopolska	Poland	2.2	Mateusz Komar (POL)	DHL–Author
3 August	Grand Prix Betonexpressz 2000	Hungary	1.1	Zsolt Dér (SRB)	P-Nívó Betonexpressz 2000 Kft.se
4 August	GP Folignano	Italy	1.2	Francesco De Bonis (ITA)	SC Monturano Civitanova Cascinare
4 August	GP P-Nivo	Hungary	1.2	Nebojša Jovanović (SRB)	Serbia (national team)
4 August	Scandinavian Open Road Race	Sweden	1.2	Lucas Persson (SWE)	Sweden (national team)
4 August	Rund um die Hainleite	Germany	1.1	Greg Van Avermaet (BEL)	Predictor–Lotto
4–15 August	Volta a Portugal	Portugal	2.HC	Xavier Tondo (ESP)	LA–MSS
5 August	Giro Ciclistico del Cigno	Italy	1.2	Americo Novembrini (ITA)	Massi Équipe Euronics
5 August	Giro dell'Appennino	Italy	1.1	Alessandro Bertolini (ITA)	Serramenti PVC Diquigiovanni
5 August	Polynormande	France	1.1	Benoît Vaugrenard (FRA)	Française des Jeux
5 August	Sparkassen Giro Bochum	Germany	1.1	Andy Cappelle (BEL)	Landbouwkrediet–Tönissteiner
6–9 August	Tour des Pyrénées	France	2.2	Sergio Pardilla (ESP)	Viña Magna–Cropu
8–9 August	Paris–Corrèze	France	2.1	Edvald Boasson Hagen (NOR)	Maxbo Bianchi
9 August	Gran Premio Città di Camaiore	Italy	1.1	Fortunato Baliani (ITA)	Ceramica Panaria–Navigare
11 August	Puchar Uzdrowisk Karpackich	Poland	1.2	Mateusz Mróz (POL)	CCC–Polsat–Polkowice
11 August	Giro del Lazio	Italy	1.HC	Gabriele Bosisio (ITA)	Tenax
12 August	Trofeo Matteotti	Italy	1.1	Filippo Pozzato (ITA)	Liquigas
12 August	Memoriał Henryka Łasaka	Poland	1.1	Krzysztof Jeżowski (POL)	CCC–Polsat–Polkowice
12 August	Trofeo Internazionale Bastianelli	Italy	1.2	Francesco De Bonis (ITA)	SC Monturano Civitanova Cascinare
12–15 August	Tour de l'Ain	France	2.1	John Gadret (FRA)	AG2R Prévoyance
13 August	GP Città di Felino	Italy	1.HC	Tomislav Dančulović (CRO)	B.K. Loborika Croazia
14–18 August	Vuelta a Burgos	Spain	2.HC	Mauricio Soler (COL)	Barloworld
15 August	Puchar Ministra Obrony Narodowej	Poland	1.2	Tarmo Raudsepp (EST)	Rietumu Banka–Riga–Ideal
16 August	GP Capodarco	Italy	1.2	Hrvoje Miholjević (CRO)	B.K. Loborika Croazia
17 August	Gara Ciclistica Milionaria	Italy	1.2	Tomislav Dančulović (CRO)	B.K. Loborika Croazia
21 August	Grote Prijs Stad Zottegem	Belgium	1.1	Jonas Aaen Jørgensen (DEN)	Team GLS
21 August	Tre Valli Varesine	Italy	1.HC	Christian Murro (ITA)	Tenax
21–24 August	Tour du Limousin	France	2.1	Pierrick Fédrigo (FRA)	Bouygues Télécom
22 August	Coppa Ugo Agostoni	Italy	1.1	Alessandro Bertolini (ITA)	Serramenti PVC Diquigiovanni
22 August	Druivenkoers Overijse	Belgium	1.1	Roy Sentjens (BEL)	Predictor–Lotto
22–26 August	GP Tell	Switzerland	2.Ncup	Anton Rechetnikov (RUS)	Russia (national team)
22–26 August	Regio-Tour	Germany	2.1	Moisés Dueñas (ESP)	Agritubel
22–26 August	Tour of Ireland	Ireland	2.1	Stijn Vandenbergh (BEL)	Unibet.com
23 August	Coppa Bernocchi	Italy	1.1	Danilo Napolitano (ITA)	Lampre–Fondital
24–26 August	Szlakiem Walk Majora Hubala	Poland	2.2	Tomasz Kiendyś (POL)	CCC–Polsat–Polkowice
25 August	Trofeo Melinda	Italy	1.1	Santo Anzà (ITA)	Serramenti PVC Diquigiovanni
26 August	Châteauroux Classic de l'Indre Trophée Fenioux	France	1.1	Christopher Sutton (AUS)	Cofidis
26 August	Clásica Ciclista los Puertos	Spain	1.1	Héctor Guerra (ESP)	Liberty Seguros Continental
26 August	Tour du Sachsenring	Germany	1.2	Tobias Erler (GER)	3C-Gruppe
26 August	Flèche des ports flamands	Belgium	1.2	Denis Flahaut (FRA)	Babes Only–Villapark Lingemeer–Flanders
26–30 August	The Paths of Victory Tour	Turkey	2.2	Zoltán Remák (SVK)	P-Nívó Betonexpressz 2000 Kft.se
27 August	GP de Beuvry la Forêt	France	1.2	Vytautas Kaupas (LTU)	Jartazi–Promo Fashion
28–31 August	Tour du Poitou Charentes et de la Vienne	France	2.1	Thomas Voeckler (FRA)	Bouygues Télécom
28 August–2 September	Tour de la vallée d'Aoste	Italy	2.2	Alex Ardila (COL)	G.S. Unidelta Bottoli Arvedi Garda
29 August	GP Nobili Rubinetterie/Borgomanero	Italy	1.1	Luis Felipe Laverde (COL)	Ceramica Panaria–Navigare
29 August–2 September	Tour de Slovaquie	Slovakia	2.2	Joost van Leijen (NED)	Van Vliet–EBH Advocaten
30 August	Gran Premio Industria e Commercio Artigianato Carnaghese	Italy	1.1	Aurélien Passeron (FRA)	Acqua & Sapone–Caffè Mokambo
1 September	Giro del Veneto	Italy	1.HC	Alessandro Bertolini (ITA)	Serramenti PVC Diquigiovanni–Selle Italia
2 September	Grote Prijs Jef Scherens	Belgium	1.1	Bram Tankink (NED)	Quick-Step–Innergetic
4 September	Schaal J.C. Sels Merksem	Belgium	1.1	Kenny Dehaes (BEL)	Chocolade Jacques–Topsport Vlaanderen
5 September	Memorial Rik Van Steenbergen	Belgium	1.1	Greg Van Avermaet (BEL)	Predictor–Lotto
6–9 September	Tour de Toscane	Italy	2.2	Emanuele Vona (ITA)	Neri Finauto Lucchini
6–15 September	Tour de l'Avenir	France	2.Ncup	Bauke Mollema (NED)	Netherlands (national team)
8 September	Coppa Placci	Italy	1.HC	Alessandro Bertolini (ITA)	Serramenti PVC Diquigiovanni–Selle Italia
8–9 September	Triptyque des Barrages	Belgium	2.2U	Gediminas Bagdonas (LTU)	Klaipėda–Splendid
9 September	Giro della Romagna	Italy	1.1	Eddy Serri (ITA)	Miche
9 September	Mémorial Davide Fardelli	Italy	1.2	Luca Dodi (ITA)	
9 September	Polymultipliée Lyonnaise	France	1.2	Noan Lelarge (FRA)	Bretagne–Armor Lux
9 September	Trofeo Salvatore Morucci	Italy	1.2	Fabio Terrenzio (ITA)	Vega Acqua & Sapone
9–13 September	International Tour of Mevlana	Turkey	2.2	Kemal Küçükbay (TUR)	
9–15 September	Tour of Britain	United Kingdom	2.1	Romain Feillu (FRA)	Agritubel
11–16 September	Tour de Croatie	Croatia	2.2	Radoslav Rogina (CRO)	Perutnina Ptuj
15 September	Paris–Brussels	Belgium	1.HC	Robbie McEwen (AUS)	Predictor–Lotto
15 September	Prague–Karlovy Vary–Prague	Czech Republic	1.2	Stanislav Kozubek (CZE)	PSK Whirlpool–Hradec Králové
16 September	Grand Prix de Fourmies	France	1.HC	Peter Velits (SVK)	Team Wiesenhof–Felt
16 September	Rund um die Nürnberger Altstadt	Germany	1.1	Fabian Wegmann (GER)	Gerolsteiner
16 September	Chrono champenois	France	1.2	Cameron Wurf (AUS)	Australia (national team)
16 September	Trofeo Gianfranco Bianchin	Italy	1.1	Americo Novembrini (ITA)	Massi Équipe
19 September	Grand Prix de Wallonie	Belgium	1.1	Bert De Waele (BEL)	Landbouwkrediet–Tönissteiner
19–23 September	3-Länder-Tour der Sparkassen Versicherung	Germany	2.1	Thomas Dekker (NED)	Rabobank
21 September	Kampioenschap van Vlaanderen	Belgium	1.1	Baden Cooke (AUS)	Unibet.com
21 September	Tour de la Somme	France	1.1	Christophe Riblon (FRA)	AG2R Prévoyance
22 September	Gran Premio Città di Misano – Adriatico	Italy	1.1	Danilo Napolitano (ITA)	Lampre–Fondital
22 September	Tour de Rijke	Netherlands	1.1	Gert Steegmans (BEL)	Quick-Step–Innergetic
22 September	Giro del Canavese	Italy	1.2U	Marco Frapporti (ITA)	MX3 CC Cremonese Arvedi Unide
23 September	Gran Premio Industria e Commercio di Prato	Italy	1.1	Filippo Pozzato (ITA)	Liquigas
23 September	Grand Prix d'Isbergues	France	1.1	Martin Elmiger (SUI)	AG2R Prévoyance
23 September	Duo Normand	United Kingdom	1.2	Bradley Wiggins (GBR)/Michiel Elijzen (NED)	Cofidis
25 September	Ruota d'Oro	Italy	1.2	Davide Bonucelli (ITA)	
26 September	Omloop van het Houtland Lichtervelde	Belgium	1.1	Steven de Jongh (NED)	Quick-Step–Innergetic
2 October	Omloop van de Vlaamse Scheldeboorden	Belgium	1.1	Steven de Jongh (NED)	Quick-Step–Innergetic
3 October	Münsterland Giro	Germany	1.1	Jos van Emden (NED)	Rabobank Continental
4–7 October	Circuit Franco-Belge	Belgium	2.1	Gert Steegmans (BEL)	Quick-Step–Innergetic
6 October	Memorial Cimurri	Italy	1.1	Leonardo Bertagnolli (ITA)	Liquigas
6 October	Piccolo Giro di Lombardia	Italy	1.2	Marco Frapporti (ITA)	Unidelta–Acc.Arvedi–Bottoli
9 October	Monte Paschi Eroica	Italy	1.1	Alexandr Kolobnev (RUS)	Team CSC
11 October	Coppa Sabatini	Italy	1.1	Giovanni Visconti (ITA)	Quick-Step–Innergetic
11 October	Paris–Bourges	France	1.1	Romain Feillu (FRA)	Agritubel
13 October	Giro dell'Emilia	Italy	1.HC	Fränk Schleck (LUX)	Team CSC
14 October	Gran Premio Bruno Beghelli	Italy	1.1	Damiano Cunego (ITA)	Lampre–Fondital
14 October	Paris–Tours espoirs	France	1.2U	Jürgen Roelandts (BEL)	Davitamon–Win for Life–Jong Vlaanderen
16 October	Nationale Sluitingsprijs	Belgium	1.1	Floris Goesinnen (NED)	Skil–Shimano

== Final standings ==
There is a competition for the rider, team and country with the most points gained from winning or achieving a high place in the above races.

=== Individual classification ===
Rank	Name	Points
1	Alessandro Bertolini (ITA)	633
2	Luca Mazzanti (ITA)	462
3	Martijn Maaskant (NED)	449
4	Stefan van Dijk (NED)	447
5	Edvald Boasson Hagen (NOR)	405
6	Romain Feillu (FRA)	384
7	Xavier Tondo (ESP)	373
8	Cândido Barbosa (POR)	372
9	Janek Tombak (EST)	363
10	Robert Hunter (RSA)	361

=== Team classification ===
Rank	Team	Points
1	Rabobank Continental Team	1552
2	Barloworld	1438
3	Ceramica Panaria–Navigare	1437
4	Wiesenhof–Felt	1355
5	Team LPR	1277
6	Tinkoff Credit Systems	1237.5
7	Agritubel	1215
8	Tenax	1143
9	Relax–GAM	1114
10	Perutnina Ptuj	1113

=== Nation classification ===
Rank	Nation	Points
1	Italy	2868.4
2	Spain	2475
3	Netherlands	2425
4	Russia	2031.5
5	Belgium	1741
6	Poland	1725
7	France	1623
8	Slovenia	1542
9	Germany	1485
10	Portugal	1357

=== Nation under-23 classification ===
Rank	Nation under-23	Points
1	Russia	1372
2	Netherlands	1017
3	Italy	926
4	France	695
5	Belgium	632
6	Germany	579.75
7	Slovenia	558
8	Norway	503
9	Denmark	457
10	Lithuania	442
