= Thiré (surname) =

Thiré is a surname. Notable people with the surname include:

- Carlos Arthur Thiré (1917–1963), Brazilian set designer, filmmaker, costume designer, painter, and comics artist
- Cecil Thiré (1943–2020), Brazilian actor and director
- Jonathan Thiré (born 1986), French road bicycle racer
- Miguel Thiré (born 1982), Brazilian actor
