= Julien Guay =

French cyclist

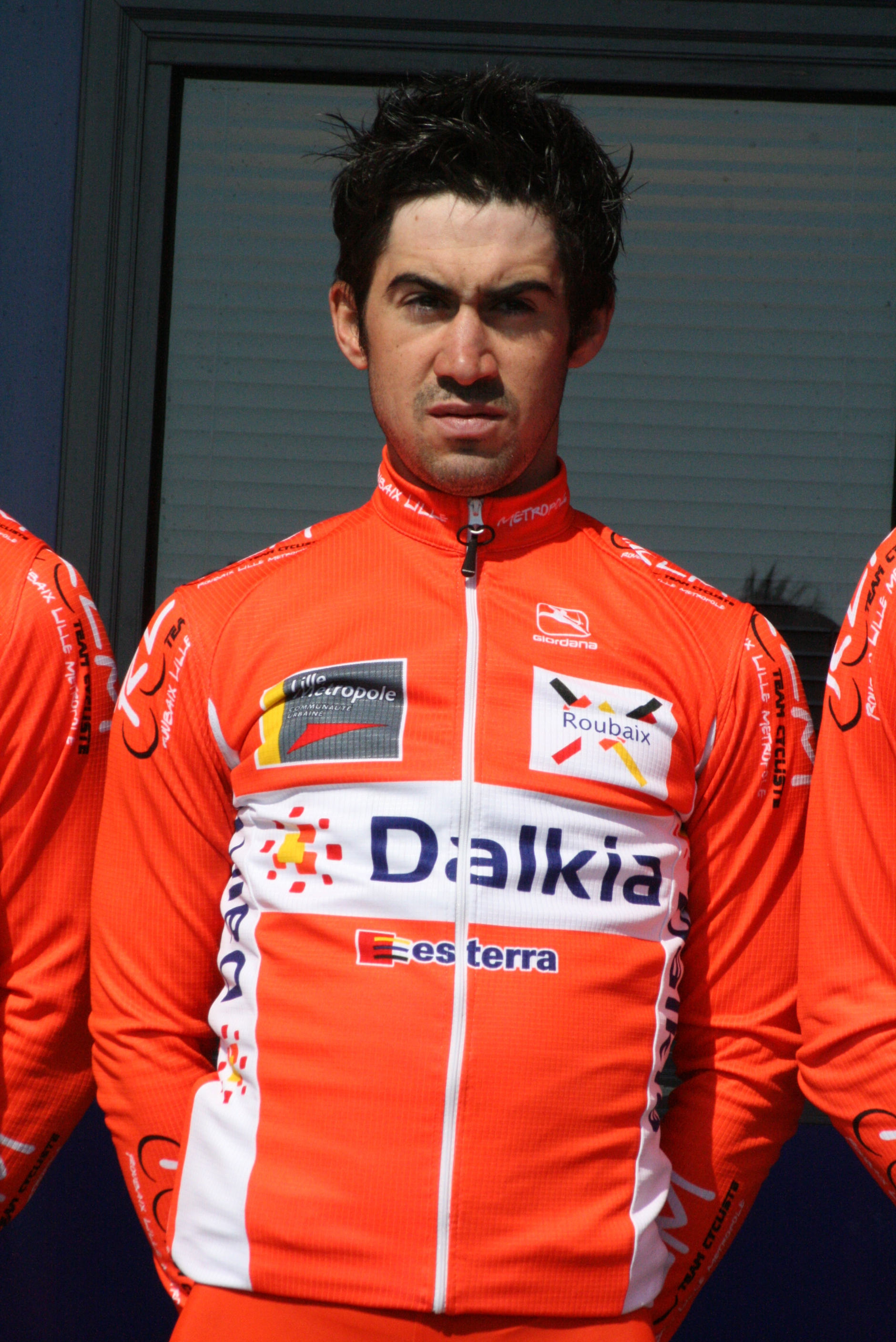
- Guay in 2011

Personal information
- Full name: Julien Guay
- Born: 9 October 1986 (age 40) Le Mans, France

Cycling career
- Sport: Cycling
- Current team: Retired
- Discipline: Road
- Role: Rider

Amateur teams
- 2005–2009: Vendée U
- 2010: CC Nogent-sur-Oise
- 2013–2014: Sojasun espoir–ACNC
- 2017–2018: Sojasun espoir–ACNC
- 2019: VC Pays de Loudéac

Professional teams
- 2009: Bbox Bouygues Telecom (stagiaire)
- 2011–2012: Roubaix–Lille Métropole
- 2013: Sojasun (stagiaire)
- 2015–2016: Auber 93

Julien Guay (born 9 October 1986 in Le Mans) is a French former professional cyclist.

== Major results ==
2007
7th Overall Tour de Gironde
2008
1st Overall Tour de Gironde

1st Stage 3

6th Overall Tour des Pyrénées
2010
1st Stage 3 Tour des Pays de Savoie
7th Overall Tour de Gironde
9th Overall Tour de Normandie
2011
4th Grand Prix de Plumelec-Morbihan
6th Overall Paris–Corrèze
2012
5th Overall Boucles de la Mayenne
7th Grand Prix d'Ouverture La Marseillaise
8th Overall Tour de Bretagne
2013
1st Road race, Brittany Regional Road Championships
2014
2nd Overall Rhône-Alpes Isère Tour
2015
9th Tour du Finistère
2017
8th Overall Tour de Bretagne
2018
10th Overall Tour de Bretagne
