= Florent Barle =

French cyclist (born 1986)

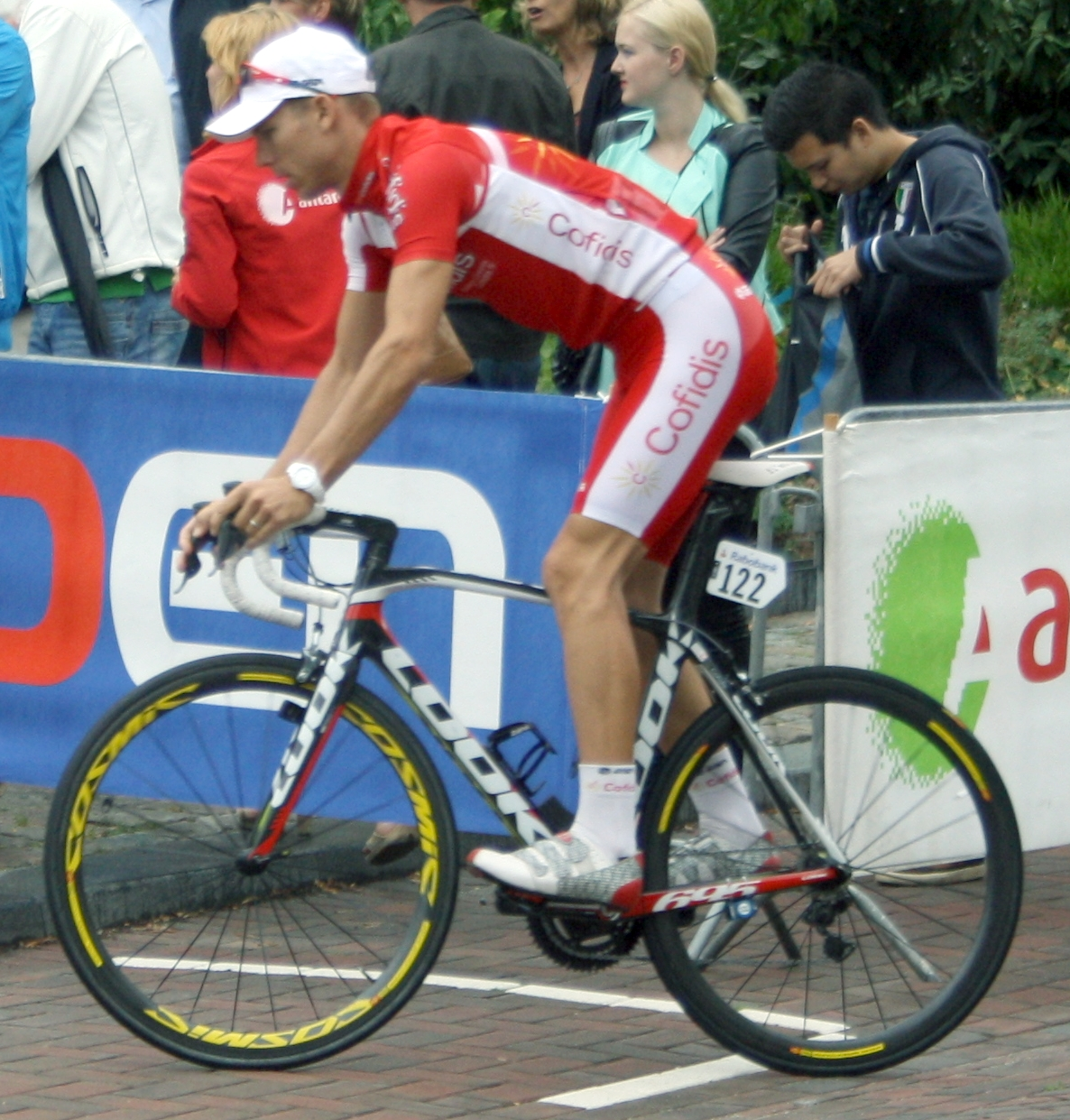

Personal information
- Born: 17 January 1986 (age 40) Cavaillon, France

Cycling career
- Sport: Cycling
- Current team: Retired
- Discipline: Road
- Role: Rider

Amateur teams
- 2010: AVC Aix-en-Provence
- 2014: EC Sainte-Luce

Professional team
- 2011–2013: Cofidis

Florent Barle (born 17 January 1986 in Cavaillon) is a French former road cyclist. He rode in the 2012 Vuelta a España and finished in 129th place.

== Major results ==
2004
5th Overall Tour du Pays de Vaud

1st Points classification

2008
2nd Overall Grand Prix Chantal Biya
8th Paris–Mantes-en-Yvelines
2009
6th Overall Tour de Gironde

1st Stage 3

6th Overall Tour Alsace
2010
1st Overall Tour des Pyrénées
7th Overall Tour Alsace
