= Tour de Gironde =

French multi-day road cycling race

Race details
- Date: May or June
- Region: France
- Discipline: Road race
- Competition: UCI Europe Tour (2005–2017)
- Type: Stage race
- Web site: assos.villenavedornon.fr/spip.php?rubrique990

History
- First edition: 1975
- Editions: 47 (as of 2023)
- First winner: Michel Fédrigo (FRA)
- Most wins: No repeat winners
- Most recent: Sente Sentjens (BEL)

The Tour de Gironde is a road bicycle race held annually in France. It was organised as a 2.2 event on the UCI Europe Tour from 2005 to 2017. Since 2018, it has been a junior event.

== Winners ==
Year	Country	Rider	Team
1975	France	Michel Fédrigo	
1976	France	Patrick Audeguil	
1977	France	Daniel Barjolin	
1978	France	Christian Jourdan	
1979	France	Francis Castaing	
1980	France	Jean-Jacques Rebière	
1981	France	Bruno De Santi	
1982	France	Philippe Lauraire	
1983	France	Gérard Mercadié	
1984	France	Daniel Amardeilh	
1985	France	Christophe Lavergne	
1986	France	Sylvain Le Goff	
1987	France	Jean-François Morio	
1988	France	Hervé Gourmelon	
1989	France	Gilles Dubois	
1990	France	Stéphane Dief	
1991	France	Jean-François Anti	
1992	France	Laurent Desbiens	
1993	Bulgaria	Hristo Zaykov	
1994	France	Denis Leproux	
1995	France	Anthony Langella	Comité d'Aquitaine
1996	France	Franck Morelle	CA Mantes-la-Jolie
1997	France	Jean-Philippe Duracka	Aulnat 63–Montluçon 03
1998	France	Martial Locatelli	CC Étupes
1999	Hungary	László Bodrogi	CC Étupes
2000	France	Pascal Peyramaure	CCL Chatillon
2001	France	Gilles Canouet	CC Marmande
2002	France	Mickaël Buffaz	VC Lyon–Vaulx-en-Velin
2003	France	Alexandre Urbain	Jean Floc'h–Moréac 56
2004	France	Vincent Joffre	CA Castelsarrasin
2005	France	Charles Guilbert	Bretagne–Jean Floc'h
2006	France	Jérôme Bonnace	UC Châteauroux–Fenioux
2007	France	Jonathan Thiré	Team UC Nantes Atlantique
2008	France	Julien Guay	Vendée U
2009	France	Stéphane Rossetto	CC Nogent-sur-Oise
2010	France	Julien Belgy	Vendée U
2011	France	Julien Foisnet	Véranda Rideau Sarthe 72
2012	Netherlands	Nick van der Lijke	Rabobank Continental Team
2013	Spain	Jon Larrinaga	Euskadi
2014	Netherlands	Remco te Brake	Metec–TKH
2015	France	Stéphane Poulhies	Occitane Cyclisme
2016	Norway	Amund Grøndahl Jansen	Team Joker Byggtorget
2017	Spain	Pablo Torres	Burgos BH
2018	France	Valentin Retailleau	Oceane–TOP 16
2019	Spain	Carlos Rodríguez	Kometa Cycling Team Contador
2020– 2021	No race due to the COVID-19 pandemic in France		
2022	Great Britain	Josh Tarling	Flanderscolor–Galloo Team
2023	Belgium	Sente Sentjens	Acrog–Balen BC Junior
