= Jan Maas (cyclist, born 1996) =

Dutch cyclist

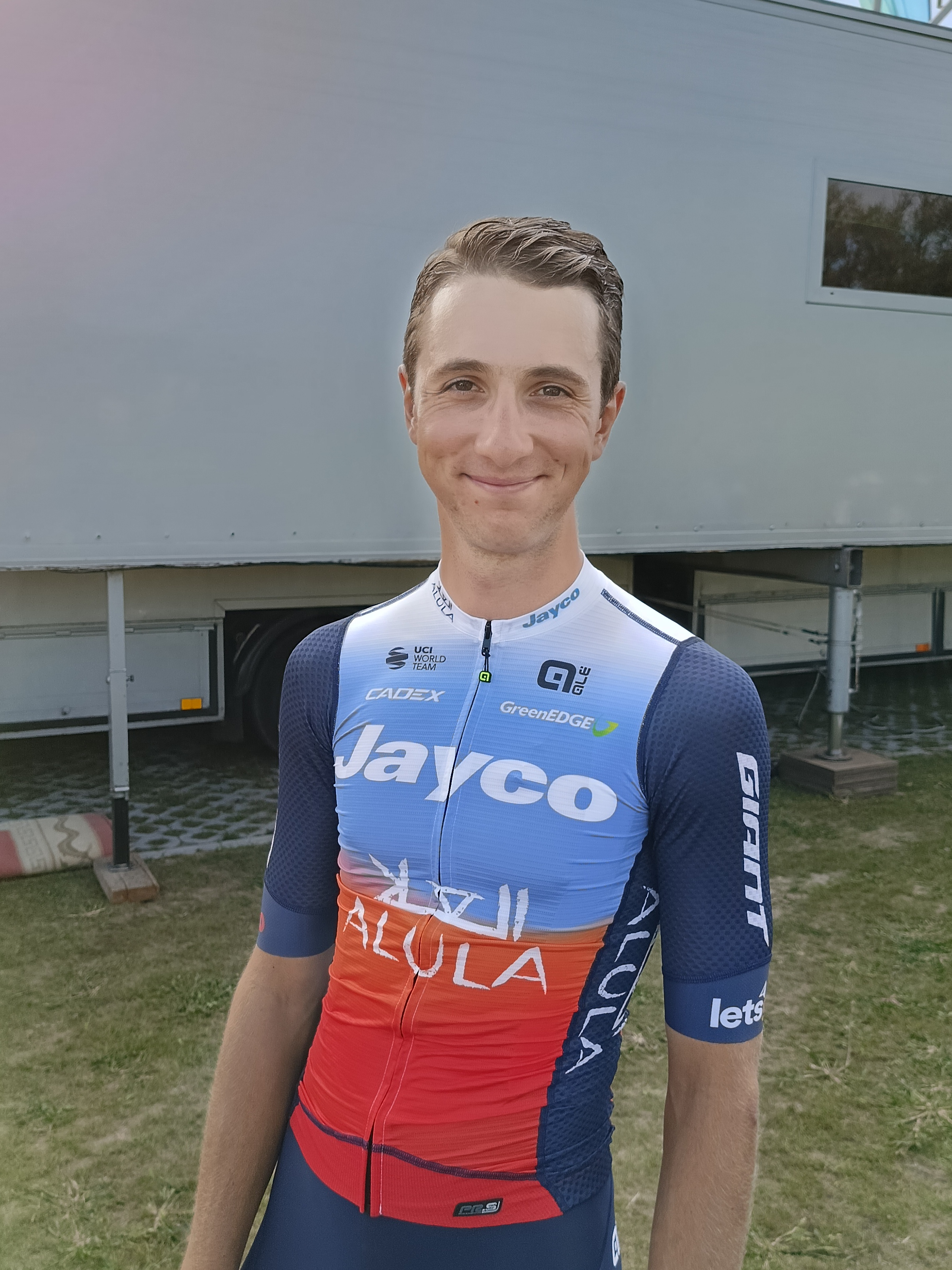
- Maas in 2024

Personal information
- Born: 19 February 1996 (age 30) Bergen op Zoom, Netherlands
- Height: 1.88 m (6 ft 2 in)
- Weight: 68 kg (150 lb)

Cycling career
- Sport: Cycling
- Current team: Cofidis
- Discipline: Road
- Role: Rider

Amateur team
- 2018: LottoNL–Jumbo (stagiaire)

Professional teams
- 2015–2016: Rabobank Development Team
- 2017–2018: SEG Racing Academy
- 2019–2021: Leopard Pro Cycling
- 2022–2024: Team BikeExchange–Jayco
- 2025–: Cofidis

Jan Maas (born 19 February 1996) is a Dutch professional racing cyclist, who currently rides for UCI WorldTeam Cofidis. In 2022 Maas was selected for the Dutch national team at the road race European and World Championships.

== Major results ==
2014
2nd Ronde van Vlaanderen Juniores
6th Overall Aubel–Thimister–La Gleize

1st Stage 2a (TTT)

2015
6th Piccolo Giro di Lombardia
10th Flèche Ardennaise
2016
8th Trofej Umag
2017
7th Flèche Ardennaise
9th Overall Ronde de l'Isard
10th Paris–Tours Espoirs
10th Gooikse Pijl
2018
9th Ronde van Midden-Nederland
2019
6th Overall Giro della Regione Friuli Venezia Giulia
2020
1st Trofeo Ciutat de Manacor
6th Tour du Doubs
2021
3rd Overall Tour de la Mirabelle
4th Overall Istrian Spring Trophy
5th Overall Oberösterreich Rundfahrt
10th Overall Sazka Tour

=== Grand Tour general classification results timeline ===
Grand Tour	2023
Giro d'Italia	—
Tour de France	—
Vuelta a España	137
