= Merijn Korevaar =

Dutch cyclist (born 1994)

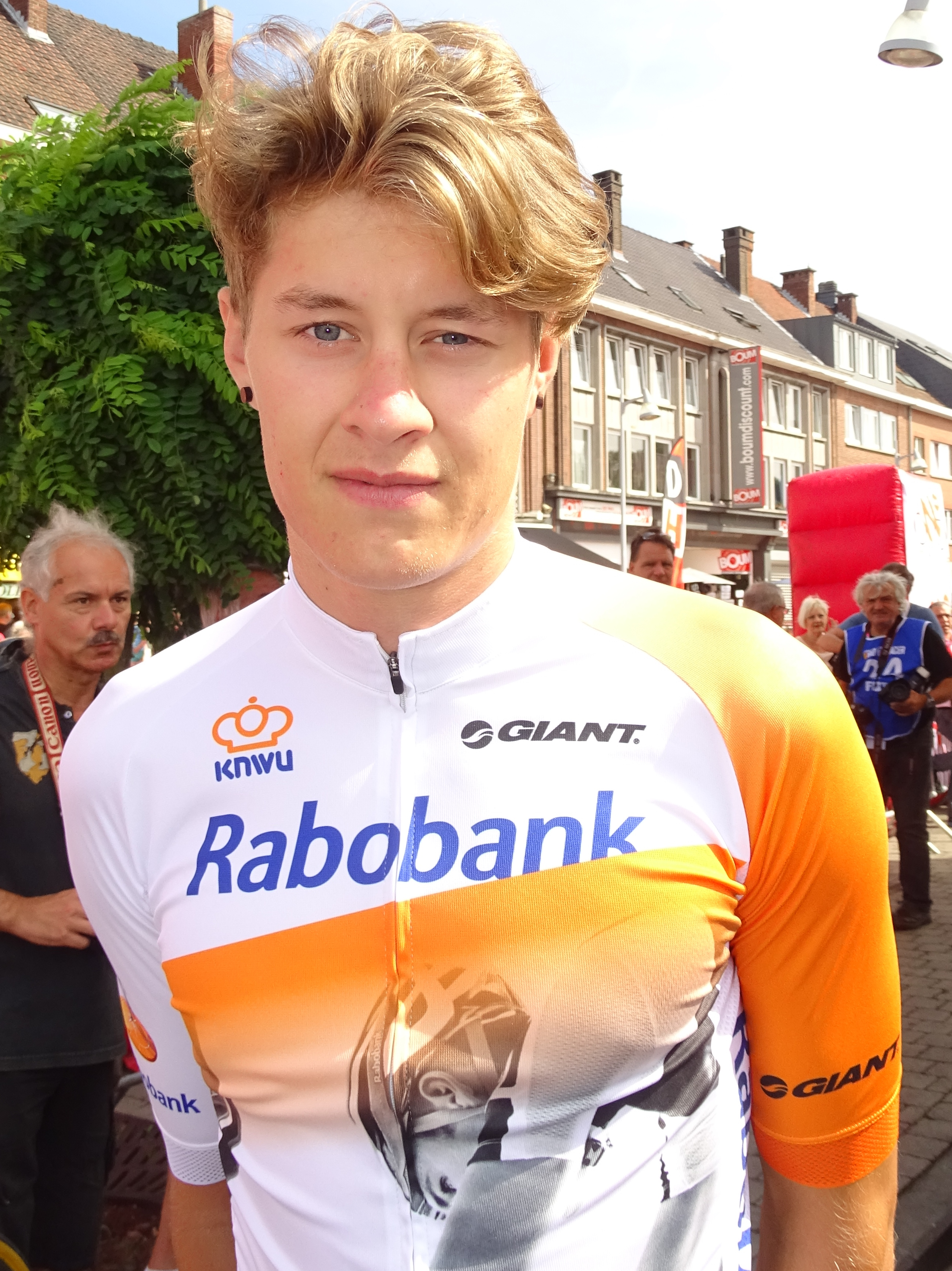
- Korevaar at the 2015 Grand Prix Pino Cerami.

Personal information
- Full name: Merijn Korevaar
- Born: 7 May 1994 (age 32) Groot-Ammers, Netherlands

Cycling career
- Sport: Cycling
- Discipline: Road
- Role: Rider

Amateur teams
- 2013–2016: Rabobank Development Team
- 2019: GRC Jan van Arckel

Professional team
- 2017: Baby-Dump Cyclingteam

Merijn Korevaar (born 7 May 1994) is a Dutch racing cyclist. He rode at the 2014 UCI Road World Championships. He is the older brother of the cyclist Jeanne Korevaar.

== Major results ==
2011
6th Overall Driedaagse van Axel
2012
2nd Road race, National Junior Road Championships
4th Gent–Menen
5th Overall Grand Prix Rüebliland

1st Stage 2

6th Overall Tour of Istria
9th Remouchamps–Ferrières–Remouchamps
2014
8th Overall Olympia's Tour

1st Young rider classification

2015
6th Dorpenomloop Rucphen
2016
8th Ster van Zwolle
8th Arno Wallaard Memorial
