= Gilles Canouet =

French cyclist

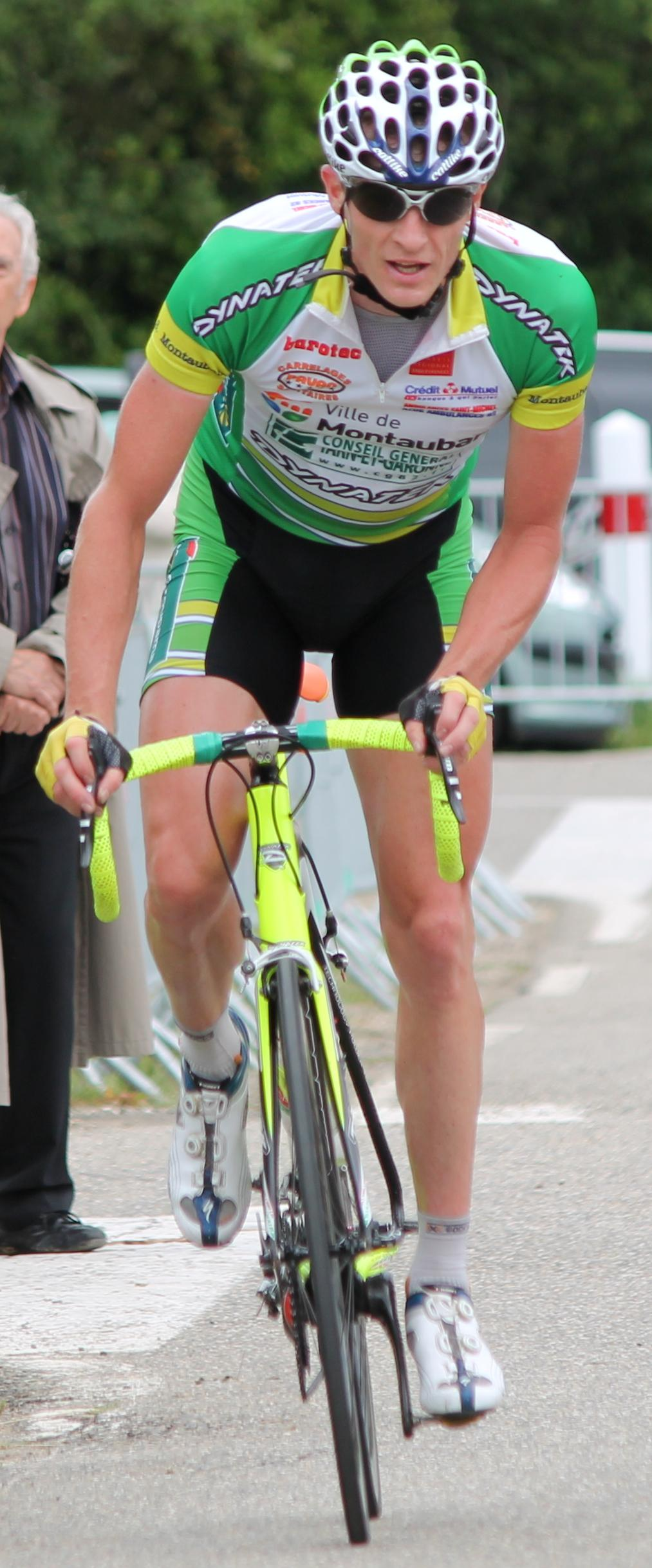

Personal information
- Born: January 20, 1976 (age 50) Rueil-Malmaison, France

Cycling career
- Sport: Cycling
- Current team: Retired
- Discipline: Road
- Role: Rider

Professional team
- 2005-2006: Agritubel

Gilles Canouet (born 20 January 1976) is a former French road racing cyclist.

== Palmares ==
2001
1st Tour de Gironde

1st stage 2

2005
1st La Roue Tourangelle
