= Tour des Pyrénées =

Race details
- Date: July–August
- Region: France, Spain
- English name: Tour of the Pyrenees
- Local name(s): Tour des Pyrénées (French); Vuelta a los Pirineos (Spanish)
- Discipline: Road race
- Competition: UCI Europe Tour
- Type: Stage race

History
- First edition: 1995
- Editions: 15
- Final edition: 2010
- First winner: Hugues Ané (FRA)
- Most wins: Denis Leproux (FRA); Igor Pavlov (RUS) (2 wins)
- Final winner: Florent Barle (FRA)

The Tour des Pyrénées was a road bicycle race held annually from 1995 to 2010 across the Pyrenees mountains in southwestern France and northeastern Spain. In 2006 it became a 2.2 event on the UCI Europe Tour.

== Winners ==
Year	Country	Rider	Team
1995	France	Hugues Ané	
1996	France	Denis Leproux	
1997	France	Denis Leproux	
1998	France	Christophe Oriol	Casino–Ag2r
1999	Russia	Igor Pavlov	
2000	France	Éric Drubay	CC Étupes
2001	Russia	Igor Pavlov	
2002	France	Maryan Hary	
2003	Spain	Fernando Torres Martín	
2004	Austria	Bernhard Kohl	Rabobank GS3
2006	Spain	Enrique Salgueiro	
2007	Spain	Sergio Pardilla	Viña Magna–Cropu
2008	Great Britain	Daniel Fleeman	An Post–M.Donnelly–Grant Thornton–Sean Kelly
2009	Colombia	Fabio Duarte	Colombia es Pasión–Coldeportes
2010	France	Florent Barle	AVC Aix-en-Provence
