= Dennis van Winden =

Dutch road bicycle racer

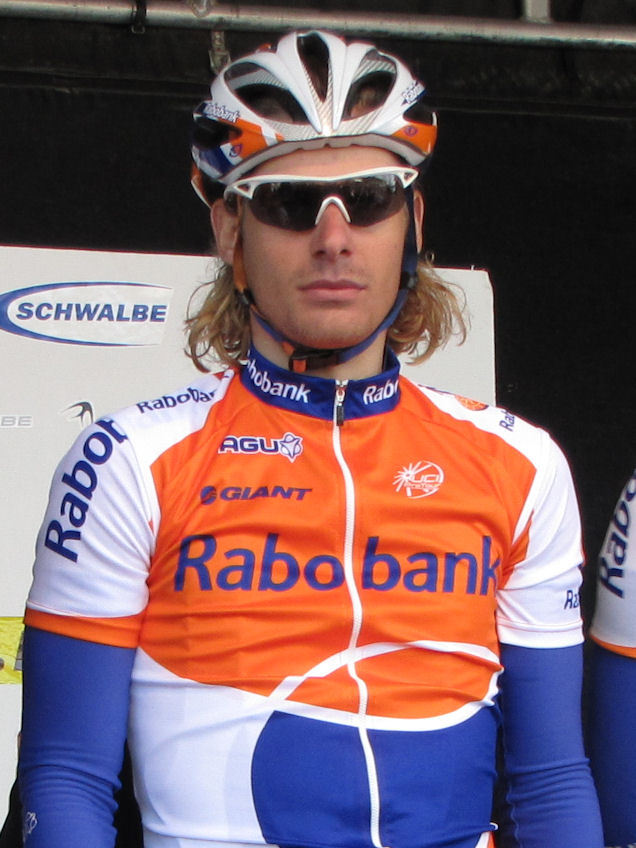
- Van Winden at the 2010 Rund um Köln

Personal information
- Full name: Dennis van Winden
- Born: 2 December 1987 (age 38) Delft, the Netherlands
- Height: 185 cm (6 ft 1 in)
- Weight: 72 kg (159 lb)

Cycling career
- Sport: Cycling
- Discipline: Road
- Role: Rider

Amateur teams
- 2006: B&E Koopmans Cycling Team CT
- 2007–2009: Rabobank Continental Team

Professional teams
- 2010–2014: Rabobank
- 2015: Synergy Baku
- 2015–2016: LottoNL–Jumbo
- 2017–2019: Israel Cycling Academy

Dennis van Winden (born 2 December 1987) is a Dutch professional road bicycle racer, who last rode for UCI Professional Continental team Israel Cycling Academy.

== Career ==
=== Amateur career ===
Born in Delft, van Winden joined the Rabobank Continental Team in 2007 at the age of 19, where he enjoyed success at the Under-23 level in his three seasons with the team, taking several wins including the national Under-23 time trial title and a stage of the Tour de l'Avenir, as well as a third-placed finish in the U23 Liège–Bastogne–Liège.

=== Professional career ===
He subsequently turned professional with Rabobank in 2010. In November 2012 he underwent surgery to correct a kink that had developed in an internal iliac artery in his right leg, however he contracted an infection from the surgery which resulted in months of further treatment, leaving him unable to return to competition until May 2013.

In November 2014 van Winden announced that he would join Synergy Baku for the 2015 season, with a focus on riding as part of the team's sprint train. However, in May 2015 it was announced that he would rejoin his old team, then known as LottoNL–Jumbo, after four months with Synergy Baku. In October 2016 he announced that he would join the Israel Cycling Academy for the 2017 season.

== Major results ==
2006
1st Omloop van de Alblasserwaard
2007
2nd Overall Giro delle Regioni
2008
1st Overall Tour du Haut-Anjou

1st Stage 1

1st Stage 2 Giro delle Regioni
2nd Vlaamse Pijl
2009
1st Time trial, National Under–23 Road Championships
1st Prologue Istrian Spring Trophy
1st Stage 1 Tour de Bretagne Cycliste
1st Stage 2 Vuelta Ciclista a León
1st Stage 9 Tour de l'Avenir
1st Stage 1 (TTT) Olympia's Tour
3rd U23 Liège–Bastogne–Liège
2011
9th Ster ZLM Toer
2012
5th Binche–Chimay–Binche
9th Ronde van Zeeland Seaports
2017
7th Overall Tour de Azerbaijan
9th Schaal Sels
2018
9th Overall Czech Cycling Tour
10th Overall Arctic Race of Norway
