= Alessandro Bertolini =

Italian cyclist

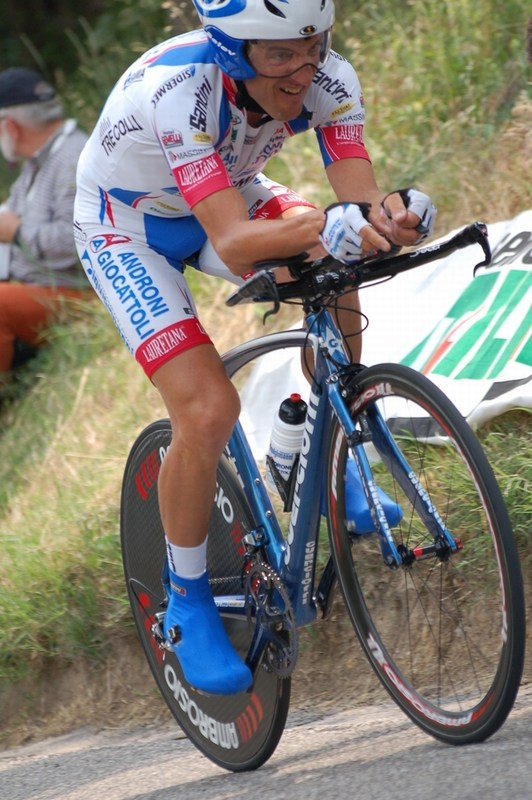

Personal information
- Full name: Alessandro Bertolini
- Born: 27 July 1971 (age 55) Rovereto, Italy

Cycling career
- Sport: Cycling
- Discipline: Road
- Role: Rider

Professional teams
- 1994–1995: Carrera Jeans-Tassoni
- 1996: Brescialat
- 1997: MG Maglificio-Technogym
- 1998: Cofidis
- 1999: Mobilvetta Design-Northwave
- 2000–2004: Alessio
- 2005: Domina Vacanze
- 2006–2011: Selle Italia–Diquigiovanni

Major wins
- Grand Tours Giro d'Italia 1 stage (2008) One-day races and Classics Paris–Brussels (1997) Giro del Piemonte (2003) Giro dell'Appennino (2007, 2008) Giro del Veneto (2007) Coppa Placci (2007) Others UCI Europe Tour (2007) Trittico Lombardo (2007)

Alessandro Bertolini (born 27 July 1971) is an Italian professional road racing cyclist, who last rode for the UCI Professional Continental cycling team Androni Giocattoli. He is also known in Italy as "Alex" Bertolini.

== Major results ==
1991
1st Coppa Collecchio
1996
1st, Stage 1, Euskal Bizikleta
1997
1st, Stage 2, Giro di Sardegna
1st, Paris–Brussels
10th, Giro di Lombardia
1998
7th, Paris–Tours
1999
1st, Schynberg Rundfahrt
2000
1st, Stage 3, Tour of Austria
1st, Stage 8, Peace Race
2001
1st, Circuito de Getxo
2003
1st, Giro del Piemonte
2004
1st Overall, Giro della Provincia Di Lucca

1st, Stage 3

2005
1st, Coppa Sabatini
2006
1st, Coppa Agostoni
1st, Stage 4, Circuit de la Sarthe
2007
1st, UCI Europe Tour
1st, Giro dell'Appennino
1st, Coppa Agostoni
1st, Trittico Lombardo
1st, Giro del Veneto
1st, Coppa Placci
1st, Stage 1a, Settimana internazionale di Coppi e Bartali
2008
1st, stage 11, Giro d'Italia
1st, Giro dell'Appennino
2010
1st, Stage 3, Giro del Trentino
3rd, Giro dell'Appennino
