= Martijn Keizer =

Dutch cyclist

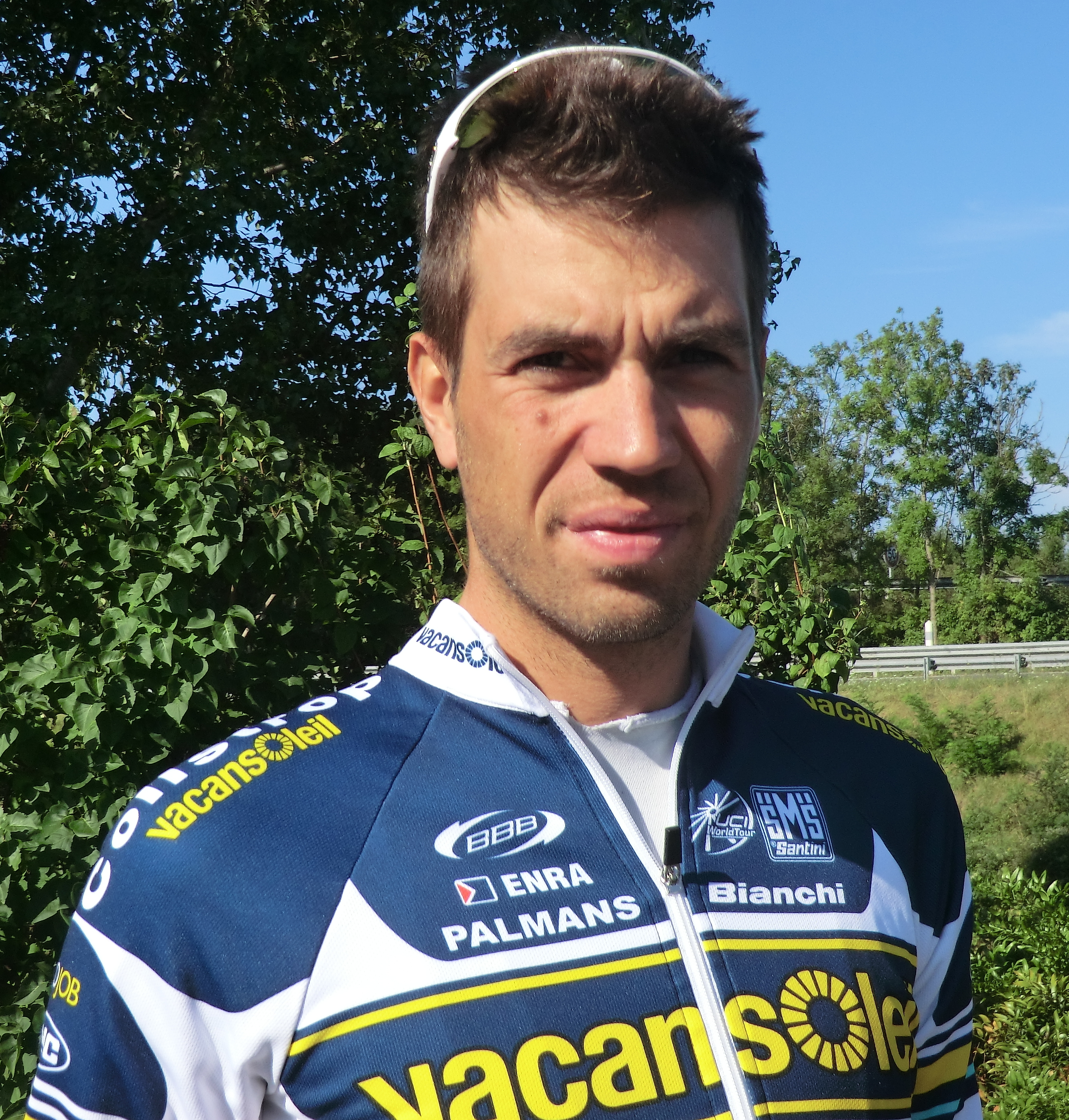
- Keizer at the 2013 Tour de l'Ain

Personal information
- Full name: Martijn Keizer
- Born: 25 March 1988 (age 38) Muntendam, the Netherlands
- Height: 1.93 m (6 ft 4 in)
- Weight: 72 kg (159 lb)

Cycling career
- Sport: Cycling
- Discipline: Road
- Role: Rider
- Rider type: All-rounder

Amateur team
- 2018: NWV Groningen

Professional teams
- 2007–2010: Rabobank Continental Team
- 2011–2013: Vacansoleil–DCM
- 2014: Veranclassic–Doltcini
- 2014–2017: Belkin Pro Cycling

Martijn Keizer (born 25 March 1988) is a Dutch former professional road racing cyclist, who competed professionally between 2007 and 2017 for the Rabobank Continental Team, Vacansoleil–DCM, Veranclassic–Doltcini, and LottoNL–Jumbo teams.

== Major results ==
2005
1st Time trial, National Junior Road Championships
2006
1st Time trial, National Junior Road Championships
5th Road race, UEC European Junior Road Championships
2007
1st Overall Tour du Haut-Anjou

1st Young rider classification
1st Stage 2 (ITT)

5th Overall Les 3 Jours de Vaucluse
2008
6th Overall Tour du Haut-Anjou
8th Overall Thüringen Rundfahrt der U23
2009
3rd Time trial, National Under-23 Road Championships
7th Overall Vuelta Ciclista a León
9th Overall Tour of Turkey
2010
1st Time trial, National Under-23 Road Championships
1st Stage 2 (ITT) Tour de Bretagne
1st Prologue Circuito Montañés
5th Overall Circuit des Ardennes
5th Overall Olympia's Tour
9th Liège–Bastogne–Liège U23
2011
1st Boucles de l'Aulne
3rd Time trial, National Road Championships
3rd Duo Normand (with Jens Mouris)
8th Overall Four Days of Dunkirk
2013
1st Mountains classification Ster ZLM Toer
2015
2nd Overall Tour de l'Eurométropole
8th Overall Driedaagse van West-Vlaanderen

=== Grand Tour general classification results timeline ===
Grand Tour	2011	2012	2013	2014	2015	2016	2017
Giro d'Italia	—	126	101	102	56	102	116
Tour de France	Did not contest during his career						
Vuelta a España	153	102	—	80	153	137	—
