= Adria Mobil =

Recreational vehicle manufacturer

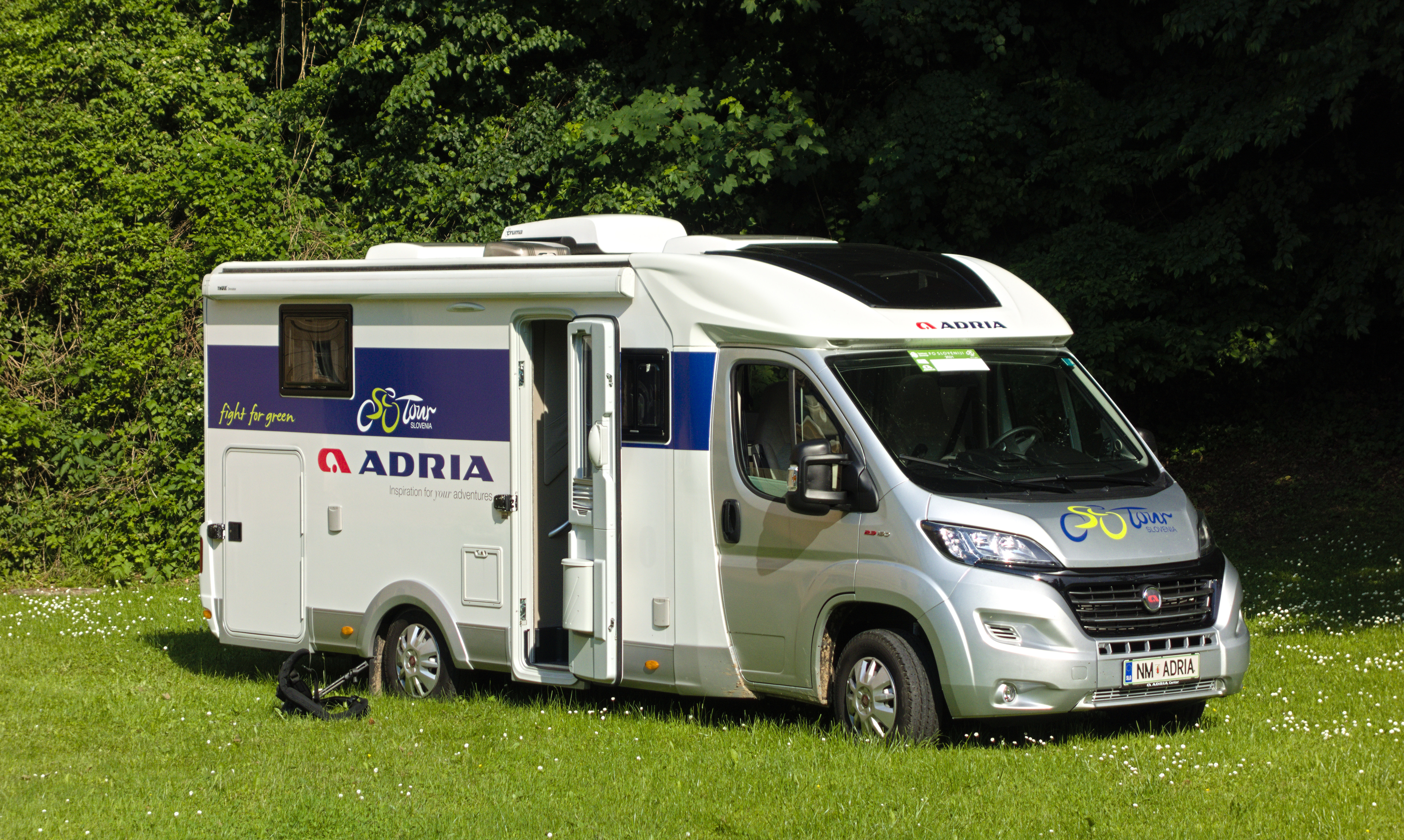
Adria Mobil motorhome as sponsor of 2021 Tour of Slovenia

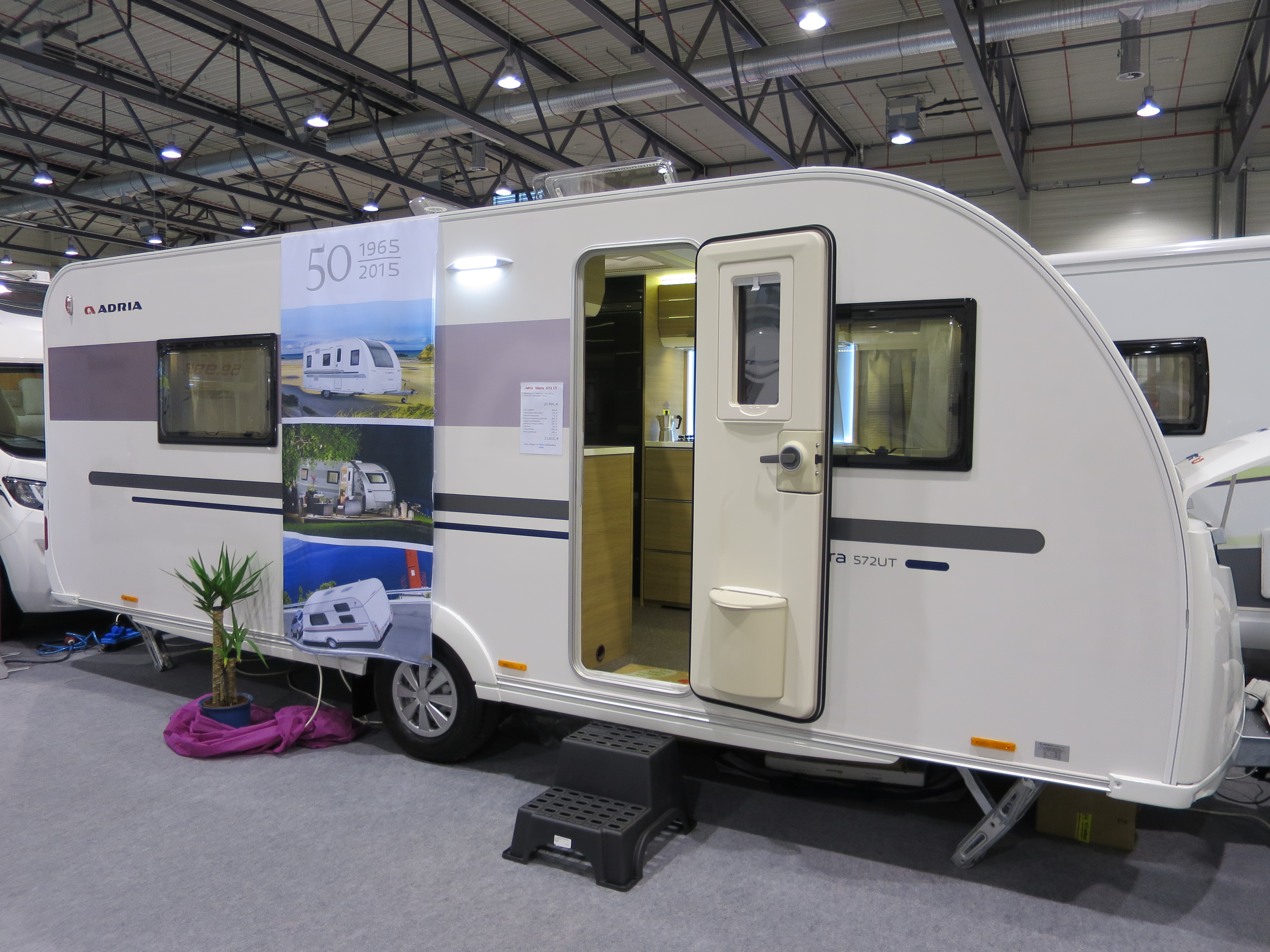
Adria Adora 572 UT

Adria Mobil is a Slovene speciality vehicle manufacturer company based in Novo Mesto that specializes in production of travel trailers and recreational vehicles. The company's products are branded under the "Adria" brand name, and it markets and sells its entire stock within Europe. Adria motorhomes are commonly based on Fiat and Mercedes vehicles.

== Rank ==
The company has a 6.5 percent market share on the European market and, as of no later than 2014, ranks in the top six of most successful European producers of leisure vehicles.

== History ==
The company was established in 1965 as a part of Industrija motornih vozil (a "basic organization of associated labour," as companies were termed in Yugoslavia) and became autonomous in 1990.

In 1982, Adria launched its first motorhome, the Adriatik.

In 1996, Adria was transferred to the new company Adria Mobil.

In 1998, Adria launched the Coral low-profile motorhome range, then in 2010 the Sonic integral motorhome.

In 2007, Adria acquired the Spanish mobile home manufacturer Sun Roller.

In 2015, the manufacturer celebrated its 50th anniversary by launching a specific collection of its Twin and Matrix models, recognizable by their metallic silver bodywork.

Adria was acquired by the French firm Trigano, one of the largest recreational vehicle companies in Europe, in 2017.

== Adria Holidays ==
Adria Holidays is a subsidiary of Adria Mobil and offers complementary tourism services in spirit of Adria Mobil's product development for active spending of spare time.

Main offerings of Adria Holidays are:

- apartments on the Adriatic coast
- yacht charter services
- rentals of Adria Mobil's caravans
