= Tour du Haut-Anjou =

Race details
- Date: May
- Region: Maine-et-Loire, Mayenne
- Discipline: Road race
- Competition: UCI Europe Tour
- Type: Stage race
- Web site: www.tourduhautanjou.com

History
- First edition: 2001
- Editions: 9
- Final edition: 2009
- First winner: Mathieu Drujon (FRA)
- Most wins: No repeat winners
- Final winner: Tejay van Garderen (USA)

The Tour du Haut-Anjou was a road bicycle race held annually in France. It was organized as a 2.2U event on the UCI Europe Tour.

== Winners ==
Year	Country	Rider	Team
2001	France	Mathieu Drujon	
2002	France	Tom Tiblier	
2003	France	Christophe Riblon	CC Nogent-sur-Oise
2004	France	Anthony Ravard	Vendée U
2005	France	Nicolas Rousseau	
2006	New Zealand	Timothy Gudsell	VS Albi
2007	Netherlands	Martijn Keizer	Rabobank Continental Team
2008	Netherlands	Dennis van Winden	Rabobank Continental Team
2009	United States	Tejay van Garderen	Rabobank Continental Team
