= Denis Leproux =

French cyclist

Personal information
- Born: 16 December 1964 (age 61) Saint-Calais, France

Cycling career
- Sport: Cycling
- Current team: Retired
- Discipline: Road
- Role: Rider

Professional teams
- 1987–1988: Vétements Z–Peugeot
- 1998–2000: BigMat–Auber 93

Denis Leproux (French pronunciation: [dəni ləpʁu]; born 16 December 1964) is a French former racing cyclist. He rode in the 1998 Tour de France, where he finished 39th overall.

== Major results ==
1986
3rd Overall Tour du Limousin

1st Stage 1

1987
3rd Polymultipliée
4th Overall Circuit Cycliste Sarthe
1988
7th GP de la Ville de Rennes
1992
1st Overall Tour de l'Ain
1997
1st Overall Ronde de l'Isard
2nd Overall Circuit des Mines
1999
6th Tour du Doubs
9th Overall Tour de Pologne
2000
1st Stage 4 Tour de l'Ain
