= Rabobank Development Team =

Dutch cycling team

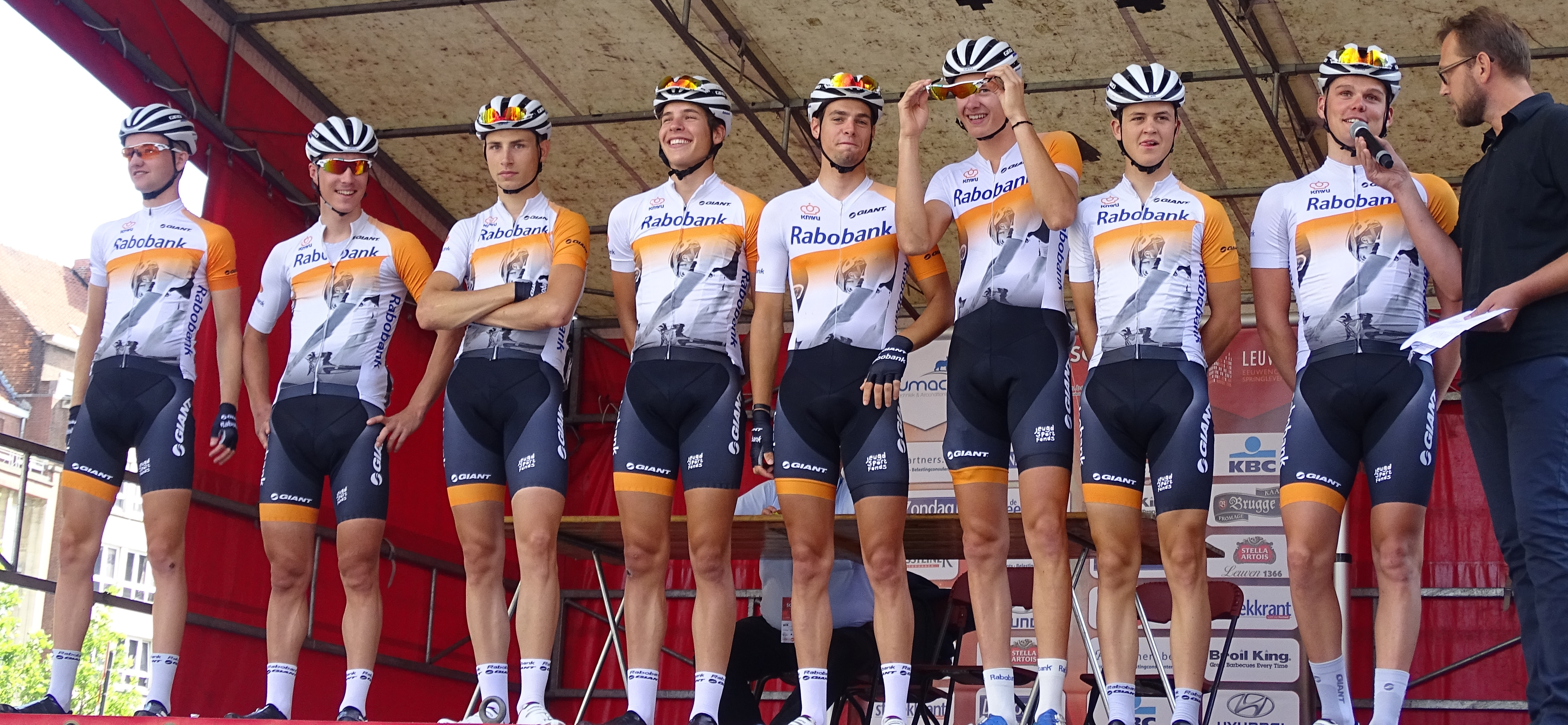

Team information
- UCI code: RB3
- Registered: Netherlands
- Founded: 1997
- Disbanded: 2016
- Discipline: Road
- Status: UCI Continental
- Bicycles: Giant

Team name history
- 1997–2001 2002–2004 2005–2010 2011–2012 2013–2016: Rabobank Beloften; Rabobank TT3; Rabobank Continental; Rabobank Continental Team; Rabobank Development Team

Rabobank Development Team was a professional bicycle racing team, the development team of the former Rabobank team now known as Visma–Lease a Bike. The team folded after the 2016 season.

== Team ==
=== 2016 ===
Roster in 2016, age as of 1 January 2016:

Rider	Date of birth
Sjoerd Bax (NED)	6 January 1996 (aged 19)
Cees Bol (NED)	27 July 1995 (aged 20)
Dylan Bouwmans (NED)	16 January 1997 (aged 18)
Martijn Budding (NED)	31 August 1995 (aged 20)
Mitchell Cornelisse (NED)	24 January 1996 (aged 19)
Hartthijs de Vries (NED)	11 July 1996 (aged 19)
Stan Godrie (NED)	9 January 1993 (aged 22)
Davy Gunst (NED)	7 January 1995 (aged 20)
Lennard Hofstede (NED)	29 December 1994 (aged 21)
Nino Honigh (NED)	7 January 1995 (aged 20)

Rider	Date of birth
Merijn Korevaar (NED)	7 May 1994 (aged 21)
Peter Lenderink (NED)	11 February 1996 (aged 19)
Jan Maas (NED)	19 February 1996 (aged 19)
Jeroen Meijers (NED)	12 January 1993 (aged 22)
Joris Nieuwenhuis (NED)	11 February 1996 (aged 19)
Jelle Nieuwpoort (NED)	28 June 1997 (aged 18)
Bob Olieslagers (NED)	17 March 1997 (aged 18)
Martijn Tusveld (NED)	9 September 1993 (aged 22)
Maik van der Heijden (NED)	3 April 1997 (aged 18)
Sieben Wouters (NED)	23 June 1996 (aged 19)

=== 2015 ===
As of 30 July 2015.

Rider	Date of birth
Sam Oomen (NED)	15 August 1995 (age 31)
Maarten van Trijp (NED)	6 October 1993 (age 32)
Martijn Tusveld (NED)	9 September 1993 (age 32)
Stan Godrie (NED)	9 January 1993 (age 33)
Lennard Hofstede (NED)	29 December 1994 (age 31)
Piotr Havik (NED)	7 July 1994 (age 32)
Merijn Korevaar (NED)	7 May 1994 (age 32)
Jeroen Meijers (NED)	12 January 1993 (age 33)
Cees Bol (NED)	27 July 1995 (age 31)
Martijn Budding (NED)	31 August 1995 (age 31)

Rider	Date of birth
Sjoerd Bax (NED)	6 January 1996 (age 30)
Mitchell Cornelisse (NED)	26 January 1996 (age 30)
Nino Honigh (NED)	7 January 1995 (age 31)
Peter Lenderink (NED)	11 February 1996 (age 30)
Jan Maas (NED)	19 February 1996 (age 30)
Joris Nieuwenhuis (NED)	11 February 1996 (age 30)
Antwan Tolhoek (NED)	29 April 1994 (age 32)
Hartthijs De Vries (NED)	11 July 1996 (age 30)
Sieben Wouters (NED)	23 June 1996 (age 30)

== Major wins ==
2004
Dutch National Under-23 Time Trial Championships, Thomas Dekker
2006
Overall Olympia's Tour, Tom Veelers

Prologue, Rick Flens
Stages 6, 7 & 9, Tom Veelers

2007
Ronde van Drenthe, Martijn Maaskant
Overall Tour de Normandie, Martijn Maaskant

Stage 1 (ITT), Lars Boom

Overall Le Triptyque des Monts et Châteaux, Tom Leezer

Stage 2 (ITT), Tom Leezer

Omloop der Kempen, Lars Boom
Overall Olympia's Tour, Thomas Berkhout

Prologue, Stages 4 & 6 (ITT), Lars Boom
Stage 1, Martijn Maaskant
Stage 2, Tom Leezer
Stage 5, Coen Vermeltfoort

Internationale Wielertrofee Jong Maar Moedig, Sven Nys
Overall Tour de l'Avenir, Bauke Mollema
UCI World Under-23 Time Trial Championships, Lars Boom
Münsterland Giro, Jos van Emden
2008
Stage 8 Tour de Normandie, Jos van Emden
Ronde van Drenthe, Coen Vermeltfoort
Stage 1 Rhône-Alpes Isère Tour, Jos van Emden
Stages 1 & 2 Tour de Bretagne, Coen Vermeltfoort
Stages 3 & 6 (ITT) Tour de Bretagne, Lars Boom
Stage 2 Flèche du Sud, Tejay van Garderen
Overall Tour du Haut-Anjou, Dennis van Winden

Stages 1 & 2 (ITT), Dennis van Winden

Overall Olympia's Tour, Lars Boom

Stages 1 & 3, Coen Vermeltfoort
Stages 7 (ITT) & 8, Lars Boom

Paris–Roubaix Espoirs, Coen Vermeltfoort
Overall Volta a Lleida, Lars Boom

Stage 3, Marcel Beima
Stage 5 (ITT), Tejay van Garderen
Stage 6, Lars Boom

Stages 1, 6 (ITT) & 8 Circuito Montañés, Lars Boom
Stage 3 Circuito Montañés, Michel Kreder
Netherlands Under-23 Road Race Championships, Lars Boom
Stage 1 Tour Alsace, Michel Kreder
Stage 4 Vuelta Ciclista a León, Lars Boom
Stage 5 Vuelta Ciclista a León, Jos van Emden
Stage 4 Grand Prix Guillaume Tell, Tejay van Garderen
Stage 5 Grand Prix Guillaume Tell, Coen Vermeltfoort
Netherlands Under-23 Time Trial Championships, Lars Boom
Stage 3 Tour de l'Avenir, Coen Vermeltfoort
Stage 5 Tour de l'Avenir, Ricardo van der Velde
Stage 5 Tour of Missouri, Boy van Poppel
Stage 10 Tour de l'Avenir, Tejay van Garderen
Stage 2 Cinturó de l'Empordà, Thomas Rabou
2009
Stage 1 (ITT) Istrian Spring Trophy, Dennis van Winden
Stage 4 Istrian Spring Trophy, Michael Van Staeyen
Stage 3 Tour de Normandie, Boy van Poppel
Stage 1 Tour de Bretagne, Dennis van Winden
Ronde van Noord-Holland, Theo Bos
Omloop der Kempen, Theo Bos
Overall Tour du Haut-Anjou, Tejay van Garderen
Overall Olympia's Tour, Jetse Bol

Prologue, team time trial
Stages 1, 2 & 4, Theo Bos
Stage 5, Tejay van Garderen

Stage 4 Circuit de Lorraine, Michel Kreder
Overall Circuito Montañés, Tejay van Garderen

Stage 1, Michel Kreder

Netherlands U23 Road Race Championships, Steven Kruijswijk
Stage 2 Vuelta Ciclista a León, Dennis van Winden
Stage 3 Vuelta Ciclista a León, Michael Van Staeyen
Netherlands U23 Time Trial Championships, Dennis van Winden
Stage 9 Tour de l'Avenir, Dennis van Winden
2010
Prologue Tour de Normandie, Jetse Bol
Overall Le Triptyque des Monts et Châteaux, Jetse Bol

Stage 2 (ITT), Jetse Bol

Stage 2 Circuit des Ardennes, Tom-Jelte Slagter
Zellik–Galmaarden, Coen Vermeltfoort
Stage 1 Tour de Bretagne, Jetse Bol
Stage 2 Tour de Bretagne, Martijn Keizer
Skandis GP, Tom-Jelte Slagter
Stages 4 & 6 Olympia's Tour, Coen Vermeltfoort
Prologue Circuito Montañés, Martijn Keizer
Thüringen Rundfahrt der U23, Barry Markus
Netherlands U23 Road Race Championships, Tom-Jelte Slagter
Netherlands U23 Time Trial Championships, Martijn Keizer
Stage 4 Kreiz Breizh Elites, Boy van Poppel
Overall Tour Alsace, Wilco Kelderman

Stage 6, Wilco Kelderman

Ronde van Midden-Nederland, Michel Kreder
2011
Ster van Zwolle, Barry Markus
Dorpenomloop Rucphen, Barry Markus
Overall Le Triptyque des Monts et Châteaux, Tom Dumoulin
Stages 1 & 3 Tour de Bretagne, Jetse Bol
Overall Olympia's Tour, Jetse Bol

Stages 1 & 6, Jetse Bol

Paris–Roubaix Espoirs, Ramon Sinkeldam
Overall Tour of Norway, Wilco Kelderman
Overall Thüringen Rundfahrt der U23, Wilco Kelderman

Stages 5 (ITT) & 6, Wilco Kelderman

Netherlands U23 Time Trial Championships, Wilco Kelderman
Netherlands U23 Road Race Championships, Ramon Sinkeldam
Stages 2 & 4 Kreiz Breizh Elites, Moreno Hofland
Overall Vuelta Ciclista a León, Marc Goos
Stage 1, Barry Markus
Stage 3, team time trial
Prologue Tour de l'Ain, Wilco Kelderman
Stage 2 Tour de l'Avenir, Moreno Hofland
2012
Prologue Istrian Spring Trophy, Ivar Slik
Stage 2a (ITT) Le Triptyque des Monts et Châteaux, Dylan van Baarle
Arno Wallaard Memorial, Dylan van Baarle
Overall Olympia's Tour, Dylan van Baarle

Prologue, Dylan van Baarle
Stage 2, Jenning Huizenga

Overall Tour de Gironde, Nick van der Lijke
Stage 1, Nick van der Lijke
Stage 1 Thüringen Rundfahrt der U23, team time trial
Stages 2 & 5 Thüringen Rundfahrt der U23, Danny van Poppel
Netherlands U23 Road Race Championships, Moreno Hofland
Stage 4 Kreiz Breizh Elites, Moreno Hofland
Stage 1 Vuelta Ciclista a León, Danny van Poppel
Ronde van Midden-Nederland, Ivar Slik
Stage 2 Tour de l'Avenir, Moreno Hofland
Germany U23 Road Race Championships, Rick Zabel
2013
Beverbeek Classic, Nick van der Lijke
Ster van Zwolle, Dylan van Baarle
Dorpenomloop Rucphen, Dylan van Baarle
Stage 5 Tour de Normandie, Rick Zabel
Ronde van Vlaanderen U23, Rick Zabel
Stage 6 (ITT) Tour de Bretagne, Dylan van Baarle
Overall Olympia's Tour, Dylan van Baarle

Stage 4, Dylan van Baarle

Stage 1 Tour de Gironde, Maarten van Trijp
Netherlands U23 Time Trial Championships, Dylan van Baarle
Overall Thüringen Rundfahrt der U23, Dylan van Baarle
Netherlands U23 Road Race Championships, Dylan van Baarle
Overall Kreiz Breizh Elites, Nick van der Lijke

Stage 2 (ITT), Nick van der Lijke

Baronie Breda Classic, Mike Teunissen
Round 1 UCI Cyclo-cross World Cup (Valkenberg), Lars van der Haar
2014
Ster van Zwolle, Bert-Jan Lindeman
Stage 1 Le Triptyque des Monts et Châteaux, André Looij
Overall Tour de Bretagne, Bert-Jan Lindeman

Stage 6, André Looij

Paris–Roubaix Espoirs, Mike Teunissen
Stage 2 Kreiz Breizh Elites, André Looij
Stage 3 Kreiz Breizh Elites, Timo Roosen
Stage 4 Kreiz Breizh Elites, Stan Godrie
Overall Tour de l'Ain, Bert-Jan Lindeman

Stage 3, Bert-Jan Lindeman

Rabo Baronie Breda Classic, Mike Teunissen
Paris–Tours Espoirs, Mike Teunissen
2015
Overall Rhône-Alpes Isère Tour, Sam Oomen

Stage 1, Sam Oomen

Stages 2 & 4 (ITT) Tour des Pays de Savoie, Sam Oomen
Netherlands U23 Road Race Championships, Stan Godrie
Paris–Tours Espoirs, Sam Oomen
2016
Stage 2 Istrian Spring Trophy, Martijn Tusveld
Flèche Ardennaise, Jeroen Meijers
Overall Rhône-Alpes Isère Tour, Lennard Hofstede

Stage 2, Lennard Hofstede

Stage 1 Ronde de l'Oise, Martijn Budding
Overall Kreiz Breizh Elites, Jeroen Meijers
Overall Olympia's Tour, Cees Bol

Stage 6, Martijn Budding

== National champions ==
2007
U23 World Championship Time Trial, Lars Boom
2008
Dutch U23 Road Race Championships, Lars Boom
Dutch U23 Time Trial Championships, Lars Boom
2009
Dutch U23 Road Race Championships, Steven Kruijswijk
Dutch U23 Time Trial Championships, Dennis van Winden
2010
Dutch U23 Road Race Championships, Tom-Jelte Slagter
Dutch U23 Time Trial Championships, Martijn Keizer
2011
Dutch U23 Road Race Championships, Wilco Kelderman
2012
Dutch U23 Road Race Championships, Moreno Hofland
German U23 Road Race Championships, Rick Zabel
2013
Dutch U23 Time Trial Championships, Dylan van Baarle
Dutch U23 Road Race Championships, Dylan van Baarle

== See also ==
- Blanco Pro Cycling Team
- Rabobank Women Cycling Team
