= Jonathan Thiré =

French cyclist

Personal information
- Full name: Jonathan Thiré
- Born: 19 April 1986 (age 40) Nantes, France

Cycling career
- Sport: Cycling
- Current team: Team U Nantes Atlantique
- Discipline: Road
- Role: Rider

Amateur teams
- 2007: Agritubel (stagiaire)
- 2013: Team U Nantes Atlantique

Professional team
- 2008–2012: Auber 93

Jonathan Thiré (born 19 April 1986 in Nantes) is a French amateur road bicycle racer for Team U Nantes Atlantique. He previously competed as a professional for Auber 93, between 2008 and 2012.

== Palmarès ==
2007
1st Overall Tour de Gironde

1st Stage 3

2008
5th Paris–Mantes-en-Yvelines
2010
3rd Overall Ronde de l'Oise
7th Route Adélie
2013
1st Mountains classification Boucles de la Mayenne
