= 2025 Tour of Taihu Lake =

2025 UCI ProSeries

Race details
- Dates: 9–12 October 2025
- Stages: 4
- Distance: 435.2 km (270.4 mi)
- Winning time: 8h 56' 54"

Results
| Jersey awarded to the overall winner | Winner | Matteo Malucelli (ITA) | (XDS Astana Team) |
| | Second | Stanisław Aniołkowski (POL) | (Cofidis) |
| | Third | Steffen De Schuyteneer (BEL) | (Lotto) |
| Jersey awarded to the points classification winner | Points | Matteo Malucelli (ITA) | (XDS Astana Team) |
| Jersey awarded to the youth classification winner | Youth | Steffen De Schuyteneer (BEL) | (Lotto) |
| | Team | (Kazakhstan) XDS Astana Team | |

The 2025 Tour of Taihu Lake was a men's road cycling stage race which took place from 9 to 12 October 2025. It was the 13th edition of the Tour of Taihu Lake, which was rated as a 2.Pro event on the 2025 UCI ProSeries calendar.

== Teams ==
Two UCI WorldTeams, six UCI ProTeams and fourteen UCI Continental teams made up the twenty-two teams in the race.

UCI WorldTeams

- Cofidis
- XDS Astana Team

UCI ProTeams

- Burgos Burpellet BH
- Euskaltel–Euskadi
- Lotto
- Team Novo Nordisk
- Team Solution Tech–Vini Fantini
- VF Group–Bardiani–CSF–Faizanè

UCI Continental Teams

- CCACHE x BODYWRAP
- China Anta–Mentech Cycling Team
- Chengdu DYC Cycling Team
- Giant Cycling Team
- HKSI Pro Cycling Team
- FNIX–SCOM–Hengxiang Cycling Team
- Huansheng–Vonoa–Taishan Sport Cycling Team
- Li-Ning Star
- Parkhotel Valkenburg
- Pingtan International Tourism Island Cycling Team
- Pogi Team Gusto Ljubljana
- Quick Pro Team
- Roojai Insurance
- Terengganu Cycling Team

== Schedule ==
Stage characteristics and winners
| Stage | Date | Route | Distance | Type | Stage winner |
|---|---|---|---|---|---|
| 1 | 9 October | Nanjing to Nanjing | 96.5 km (60.0 mi) | Hilly stage | Matteo Malucelli (ITA) |
| 2 | 10 October | Wujiang to Wujiang | 122 km (76 mi) | Flat stage | Alexander Salby (DEN) |
| 3 | 11 October | Huilongzhen to Binhan Village | 79.2 km (49.2 mi) | Flat stage | Martin Laas (EST) |
| 4 | 12 October | Wuxi to Wuxi | 137.5 km (85.4 mi) | Flat stage | Matteo Malucelli (ITA) |
| Total | | | 435.2 km (270.4 mi) | | |

== Stages ==
=== Stage 1 ===
9 October 2025 – Nanjing to Nanjing, 96.5 km (60.0 mi)

Stage 1 Result
| Rank | Rider | Team | Time |
|---|---|---|---|
| 1 | Matteo Malucelli (ITA) | XDS Astana Team | 2h 10' 18" |
| 2 | Steffen De Schuyteneer (BEL) | Lotto | + 0" |
| 3 | Stanisław Aniołkowski (POL) | Cofidis | + 0" |
| 4 | Milan Menten (BEL) | Lotto | + 0" |
| 5 | Aaron Gate (NZL) | XDS Astana Team | + 0" |
| 6 | Lev Gonov | XDS Astana Team | + 0" |
| 7 | Petr Rikunov | Chengdu DYC Cycling Team | + 0" |
| 8 | Xabier Berasategi (ESP) | Euskaltel–Euskadi | + 0" |
| 9 | Jesper Rasch (NED) | Parkhotel Valkenburg | + 0" |
| 10 | Blake Quick (AUS) | Roojai Insurance | + 0" |

General classification after Stage 1
| Rank | Rider | Team | Time |
|---|---|---|---|
| 1 | Matteo Malucelli (ITA) | XDS Astana Team | 2h 10' 08" |
| 2 | Steffen De Schuyteneer (BEL) | Lotto | + 4" |
| 3 | Stanisław Aniołkowski (POL) | Cofidis | + 5" |
| 4 | Milan Menten (BEL) | Lotto | + 7" |
| 5 | Willie Smit (RSA) | China Anta–Mentech Cycling Team | + 7" |
| 6 | Jonas Rapp (GER) | FNIX–SCOM–Hengxiang Cycling Team | + 8" |
| 7 | Aaron Gate (NZL) | XDS Astana Team | + 10" |
| 8 | Lev Gonov | XDS Astana Team | + 10" |
| 9 | Petr Rikunov | Chengdu DYC Cycling Team | + 10" |
| 10 | Xabier Berasategi (ESP) | Euskaltel–Euskadi | + 10" |

=== Stage 2 ===
10 October 2025 – Wujiang to Wujiang, 122 km (76 mi)

Stage 2 Result
| Rank | Rider | Team | Time |
|---|---|---|---|
| 1 | Alexander Salby (DEN) | Li-Ning Star | 2h 34' 35" |
| 2 | Matteo Malucelli (ITA) | XDS Astana Team | + 0" |
| 3 | Stanisław Aniołkowski (POL) | Cofidis | + 0" |
| 4 | Martin Laas (EST) | Quick Pro Team | + 0" |
| 5 | Attilio Viviani (ITA) | Team Solution Tech–Vini Fantini | + 0" |
| 6 | Filippo Fortin (ITA) | Team Solution Tech–Vini Fantini | + 0" |
| 7 | Vlas Shichkin | Pingtan International Tourism Island Cycling Team | + 0" |
| 8 | Blake Quick (AUS) | Roojai Insurance | + 0" |
| 9 | Wan Abdul Rahman Hamdan (MAS) | Terengganu Cycling Team | + 0" |
| 10 | David Dekker (NED) | Euskaltel–Euskadi | + 0" |

General classification after Stage 2
| Rank | Rider | Team | Time |
|---|---|---|---|
| 1 | Matteo Malucelli (ITA) | XDS Astana Team | 4h 44' 37" |
| 2 | Stanisław Aniołkowski (POL) | Cofidis | + 7" |
| 3 | Willie Smit (RSA) | China Anta–Mentech Cycling Team | + 7" |
| 4 | Steffen De Schuyteneer (BEL) | Lotto | + 10" |
| 5 | Josh Kench (NZL) | Li-Ning Star | + 12" |
| 6 | Milan Menten (BEL) | Lotto | + 13" |
| 7 | Jonas Rapp (GER) | FNIX–SCOM–Hengxiang Cycling Team | + 14" |
| 8 | Blake Quick (AUS) | Roojai Insurance | + 16" |
| 9 | David Dekker (NED) | Euskaltel–Euskadi | + 16" |
| 10 | Lev Gonov | XDS Astana Team | + 16" |

=== Stage 3 ===
11 October 2025 – Huilongzhen to Binhan Village, 79.2 km (49.2 mi)

Stage 3 Result
| Rank | Rider | Team | Time |
|---|---|---|---|
| 1 | Martin Laas (EST) | Quick Pro Team | 1h 27' 40" |
| 2 | Jesper Rasch (NED) | Parkhotel Valkenburg | + 0" |
| 3 | David Dekker (NED) | Euskaltel–Euskadi | + 0" |
| 4 | Matteo Malucelli (ITA) | XDS Astana Team | + 0" |
| 5 | Stanisław Aniołkowski (POL) | Cofidis | + 0" |
| 6 | Filippo Fortin (ITA) | Team Solution Tech–Vini Fantini | + 0" |
| 7 | Lorenzo Magli (ITA) | VF Group–Bardiani–CSF–Faizanè | + 0" |
| 8 | Steffen De Schuyteneer (BEL) | Lotto | + 0" |
| 9 | Nicolas Gojković (CRO) | Pogi Team Gusto Ljubljana | + 0" |
| 10 | Cristian David Pita (ECU) | Huansheng–Vonoa–Taishan Sport Cycling Team | + 0" |

General classification after Stage 3
| Rank | Rider | Team | Time |
|---|---|---|---|
| 1 | Matteo Malucelli (ITA) | XDS Astana Team | 6h 12' 13" |
| 2 | Stanisław Aniołkowski (POL) | Cofidis | + 11" |
| 3 | Willie Smit (RSA) | China Anta–Mentech Cycling Team | + 11" |
| 4 | Steffen De Schuyteneer (BEL) | Lotto | + 14" |
| 5 | Jesper Rasch (NED) | Parkhotel Valkenburg | + 14" |
| 6 | David Dekker (NED) | Euskaltel–Euskadi | + 16" |
| 7 | Milan Menten (BEL) | Lotto | + 16" |
| 8 | Josh Kench (NZL) | Li-Ning Star | + 16" |
| 9 | Blake Quick (AUS) | Roojai Insurance | + 17" |
| 10 | Enrico Zanoncello (ITA) | VF Group–Bardiani–CSF–Faizanè | + 17" |

=== Stage 4 ===
12 October 2025 – Wuxi to Wuxi, 137.5 km (85.4 mi)

Stage 4 Result
| Rank | Rider | Team | Time |
|---|---|---|---|
| 1 | Matteo Malucelli (ITA) | XDS Astana Team | 2h 44' 51" |
| 2 | Martin Laas (EST) | Quick Pro Team | + 0" |
| 3 | Steffen De Schuyteneer (BEL) | Lotto | + 0" |
| 4 | Alexander Salby (DEN) | Li-Ning Star | + 0" |
| 5 | Milan Menten (BEL) | Lotto | + 0" |
| 6 | Đorđe Đurić (SRB) | Team Solution Tech–Vini Fantini | + 0" |
| 7 | David Dekker (NED) | Euskaltel–Euskadi | + 0" |
| 8 | Stanisław Aniołkowski (POL) | Cofidis | + 0" |
| 9 | Enrico Zanoncello (ITA) | VF Group–Bardiani–CSF–Faizanè | + 0" |
| 10 | Norman Vahtra (EST) | China Anta–Mentech Cycling Team | + 0" |

General classification after Stage 4
| Rank | Rider | Team | Time |
|---|---|---|---|
| 1 | Matteo Malucelli (ITA) | XDS Astana Team | 8h 56' 54" |
| 2 | Stanisław Aniołkowski (POL) | Cofidis | + 18" |
| 4 | Steffen De Schuyteneer (BEL) | Lotto | + 19" |
| 4 | Willie Smit (RSA) | China Anta–Mentech Cycling Team | + 21" |
| 5 | Jesper Rasch (NED) | Parkhotel Valkenburg | + 22" |
| 6 | Milan Menten (BEL) | Lotto | + 24" |
| 7 | David Dekker (NED) | Euskaltel–Euskadi | + 26" |
| 8 | Josh Kench (NZL) | Li-Ning Star | + 26" |
| 9 | Blake Quick (AUS) | Roojai Insurance | + 27" |
| 10 | Enrico Zanoncello (ITA) | VF Group–Bardiani–CSF–Faizanè | + 27" |

== Classification leadership table ==
Classification leadership by stage
| Stage | Winner | General classification | Points classification | Young rider classification | Team classification |
|---|---|---|---|---|---|
| 1 | Matteo Malucelli | Matteo Malucelli | Matteo Malucelli | Steffen De Schuyteneer | XDS Astana Team |
| 2 | Alexander Salby | Matteo Malucelli | Matteo Malucelli | Steffen De Schuyteneer | XDS Astana Team |
| 3 | Martin Laas | Matteo Malucelli | Matteo Malucelli | Steffen De Schuyteneer | XDS Astana Team |
| 4 | Matteo Malucelli | Matteo Malucelli | Matteo Malucelli | Steffen De Schuyteneer | XDS Astana Team |
| Final | | Matteo Malucelli | Matteo Malucelli | Steffen De Schuyteneer | XDS Astana Team |

== Classification standings ==
Legend
| Denotes the winner of the general classification | Denotes the winner of the young rider classification |
| Denotes the winner of the points classification | |

=== General classification ===
Final general classification (1–10)
| Rank | Rider | Team | Time |
|---|---|---|---|
| 1 | Matteo Malucelli (ITA) | XDS Astana Team | 10h 52' 22" |
| 2 | Stanisław Aniołkowski (POL) | Cofidis | + 18" |
| 3 | Steffen De Schuyteneer (BEL) | Lotto | + 19" |
| 4 | Willie Smit (RSA) | China Anta–Mentech Cycling Team | + 21" |
| 5 | Jesper Rasch (NED) | Parkhotel Valkenburg | + 22" |
| 6 | Milan Menten (BEL) | Lotto | + 24" |
| 7 | David Dekker (NED) | Euskaltel–Euskadi | + 26" |
| 8 | Josh Kench (NZL) | Li-Ning Star | + 26" |
| 9 | Blake Quick (AUS) | Roojai Insurance | + 27" |
| 10 | Enrico Zanoncello (ITA) | VF Group–Bardiani–CSF–Faizanè | + 27" |

=== Points classification ===
Final points classification (1–10)
| Rank | Rider | Team | Points |
|---|---|---|---|
| 1 | Matteo Malucelli (ITA) | XDS Astana Team | 54 |
| 2 | Stanisław Aniołkowski (POL) | Cofidis | 35 |
| 3 | Martin Laas (EST) | Quick Pro Team | 34 |
| 4 | Steffen De Schuyteneer (BEL) | Lotto | 26 |
| 5 | Alexander Salby (DEN) | Li-Ning Star | 22 |
| 6 | Milan Menten (BEL) | Lotto | 18 |
| 7 | Jesper Rasch (NED) | Parkhotel Valkenburg | 17 |
| 8 | Willie Smit (RSA) | China Anta–Mentech Cycling Team | 15 |
| 9 | David Dekker (NED) | Euskaltel–Euskadi | 15 |
| 10 | Filippo Fortin (ITA) | Team Solution Tech–Vini Fantini | 10 |

=== Young rider classification ===
Final young rider classification (1–10)
| Rank | Rider | Team | Time |
|---|---|---|---|
| 1 | Steffen De Schuyteneer (BEL) | Lotto | 8h 57' 13" |
| 2 | Matyáš Kopecký (CZE) | Team Novo Nordisk | + 11" |
| 3 | Sam Maisonobe (FRA) | Cofidis | + 11" |
| 4 | Lorenzo Conforti (ITA) | VF Group–Bardiani–CSF–Faizanè | + 11" |
| 5 | Unai Zubeldia (ESP) | Euskaltel–Euskadi | + 11" |
| 6 | Otto van Zanden (NED) | Parkhotel Valkenburg | + 11" |
| 7 | Mauro Cuylits (BEL) | Lotto | + 19" |
| 8 | Joshua Giddings (GBR) | Lotto | + 26" |
| 9 | Vlas Shichkin | Pingtan International Tourism Island Cycling Team | + 43" |
| 10 | Daniel Cavia (ESP) | Burgos Burpellet BH | + 43" |

=== Team classification ===
Final team classification (1–10)
| Rank | Team | Time |
|---|---|---|
| 1 | (Kazakhstan) XDS Astana Team | 26h 52' 12" |
| 2 | (Spain) Burgos Burpellet BH | + 0" |
| 3 | (Spain) Euskaltel–Euskadi | + 0" |
| 4 | (Belgium) Lotto | + 0" |
| 5 | (Italy) VF Group–Bardiani–CSF–Faizanè | + 0" |
| 6 | (France) Cofidis | + 0" |
| 7 | (China) Li-Ning Star | + 0" |
| 8 | (United States) Team Novo Nordisk | + 0" |
| 9 | China Anta–Mentech Cycling Team | + 0" |
| 10 | (Thailand) Roojai Insurance | + 0" |
