= 2026 Tour of Hainan =

2026 UCI ProSeries

Race details
- Dates: 15–19 April 2026
- Stages: 5
- Distance: 896 km (557 mi)
- Winning time: 20h 00' 18"

Results
Jersey awarded to the overall winner	Winner	Guillermo Thomas Silva (URU)	(XDS Astana Team)
	Second	Xabier Berasategi (ESP)	(Euskaltel–Euskadi)
	Third	Thomas Pesenti (ITA)	(Team Polti VisitMalta)
Jersey awarded to the points classification winner	Points	Xabier Berasategi (ESP)	(Euskaltel–Euskadi)
Jersey awarded to the mountains classification winner	Mountains	Igor Chzhan (KAZ)	(Quick Pro Team)
	Team	(Italy) Team Polti VisitMalta	

The 2026 Tour of Hainan was a men's road cycling stage race that took place from 15 to 19 April 2026. It was the 17th edition of the Tour of Hainan, which was rated as a 2.Pro event on the 2026 UCI ProSeries calendar.

== Teams ==
Two UCI WorldTeams, eight UCI ProTeams and ten UCI Continental teams made up the twenty teams in the race.

UCI WorldTeams

- Lotto–Intermarché
- XDS Astana Team

UCI ProTeams

- Bardiani–CSF 7 Saber
- Burgos Burpellet BH
- Caja Rural–Seguros RGA
- Euskaltel–Euskadi
- MBH Bank CSB Telecom Fort
- Solution Tech NIPPO Rali
- Team Novo Nordisk
- Team Polti VisitMalta

UCI Continental Teams

- Bodywrap LTwoo Cycling Team
- CCACHE x BODYWRAP
- China Anta–Mentech Cycling Team
- FNIX–SCOM–Hengxiang Cycling Team
- Li-Ning Star
- Quick Pro Team
- Roojai Insurance Winspace
- Terengganu Cycling Team
- The Joyrun & Hurricane Cycling Team
- Wheeltop Rotor Chengdu Team

== Schedule ==
Stage characteristics and winners
Stage	Date	Route	Distance	Type	Stage winner
1	15 April	Haikou to Danzhou	177 km (110 mi)	Flat stage	Dušan Rajović (SRB)
2	16 April	Danzhou to Wuzhishan	214.1 km (133.0 mi)	Hilly stage	Guillermo Thomas Silva (URU)
3	17 April	Wuzhishan to Lingshui	217.6 km (135.2 mi)	Hilly stage	Andreas Miltiadis (CYP)
4	18 April	Lingshui to Baoting	132.7 km (82.5 mi)	Hilly stage	Guillermo Thomas Silva (URU)
5	19 April	Baoting to Sanya	154.6 km (96.1 mi)	Hilly stage	Alexander Salby (DEN)
Total			896 km (557 mi)		

== Stages ==
=== Stage 1 ===
15 April 2026 – Haikou to Danzhou, 177 km (110 mi)

Stage 1 Result
Rank	Rider	Team	Time
1	Dušan Rajović (SRB)	Solution Tech NIPPO Rali	4h 03' 04"
2	Matteo Malucelli (ITA)	XDS Astana Team	+ 0"
3	Daniel Cavia (ESP)	Burgos Burpellet BH	+ 0"
4	Steffen De Schuyteneer (BEL)	Lotto–Intermarché	+ 0"
5	Javier Serrano (ESP)	Team Polti VisitMalta	+ 0"
6	Xabier Berasategi (ESP)	Euskaltel–Euskadi	+ 0"
7	Enrico Zanoncello (ITA)	Bardiani–CSF 7 Saber	+ 0"
8	Iúri Leitão (POR)	Caja Rural–Seguros RGA	+ 0"
9	Tilen Finkšt (SLO)	Solution Tech NIPPO Rali	+ 0"
10	Paul Hennequin (FRA)	Euskaltel–Euskadi	+ 0"

General classification after Stage 1
Rank	Rider	Team	Time
1	Dušan Rajović (SRB)	Solution Tech NIPPO Rali	4h 02' 54"
2	Matteo Malucelli (ITA)	XDS Astana Team	+ 4"
3	Lorenzo Quartucci (ITA)	Burgos Burpellet BH	+ 5"
4	Igor Chzhan (KAZ)	Quick Pro Team	+ 5"
5	Daniel Cavia (ESP)	Burgos Burpellet BH	+ 6"
6	Cyrus Monk (AUS)	FNIX–SCOM–Hengxiang Cycling Team	+ 8"
7	Steffen De Schuyteneer (BEL)	Lotto–Intermarché	+ 10"
8	Javier Serrano (ESP)	Team Polti VisitMalta	+ 10"
9	Xabier Berasategi (ESP)	Euskaltel–Euskadi	+ 10"
10	Enrico Zanoncello (ITA)	Bardiani–CSF 7 Saber	+ 10"

=== Stage 2 ===
16 April 2026 – Danzhou to Wuzhishan, 214.1 km (133.0 mi)

Stage 2 Result
Rank	Rider	Team	Time
1	Guillermo Thomas Silva (URU)	XDS Astana Team	5h 18' 05"
2	Xabier Berasategi (ESP)	Euskaltel–Euskadi	+ 0"
3	Thomas Pesenti (ITA)	Team Polti VisitMalta	+ 0"
4	Diego Pablo Sevilla (ESP)	Team Polti VisitMalta	+ 0"
5	Baptiste Veistroffer (FRA)	Lotto–Intermarché	+ 0"
6	Lorenzo Quartucci (ITA)	Burgos Burpellet BH	+ 0"
7	Alessio Martinelli (ITA)	Bardiani–CSF 7 Saber	+ 0"
8	Alessandro Fancellu (ITA)	MBH Bank CSB Telecom Fort	+ 0"
9	Filippo Turconi (ITA)	Bardiani–CSF 7 Saber	+ 0"
10	David Delgado (ESP)	Quick Pro Team	+ 0"

General classification after Stage 2
Rank	Rider	Team	Time
1	Guillermo Thomas Silva (URU)	XDS Astana Team	9h 20' 59"
2	Xabier Berasategi (ESP)	Euskaltel–Euskadi	+ 4"
3	Lorenzo Quartucci (ITA)	Burgos Burpellet BH	+ 5"
4	Thomas Pesenti (ITA)	Team Polti VisitMalta	+ 6"
5	Diego Pablo Sevilla (ESP)	Team Polti VisitMalta	+ 10"
6	Clément Alleno (FRA)	Burgos Burpellet BH	+ 10"
7	Gotzon Martín (ESP)	Euskaltel–Euskadi	+ 10"
8	Francisco Muñoz (ESP)	Team Polti VisitMalta	+ 10"
9	Fabrizio Crozzolo (ARG)	Team Polti VisitMalta	+ 10"
10	Filippo Turconi (ITA)	Bardiani–CSF 7 Saber	+ 10"

=== Stage 3 ===
17 April 2026 – Wuzhishan to Lingshui, 217.6 km (135.2 mi)

Stage 3 Result
Rank	Rider	Team	Time
1	Andreas Miltiadis (CYP)	Quick Pro Team	4h 32' 58"
2	Daniel Cavia (ESP)	Burgos Burpellet BH	+ 2"
3	Xabier Berasategi (ESP)	Euskaltel–Euskadi	+ 2"
4	Alexander Konychev (ITA)	China Anta–Mentech Cycling Team	+ 2"
5	Petr Rikunov	Wheeltop Rotor Chengdu Team	+ 2"
6	Baptiste Veistroffer (FRA)	Lotto–Intermarché	+ 2"
7	Thomas Pesenti (ITA)	Team Polti VisitMalta	+ 2"
8	Santiago Umba (COL)	Solution Tech NIPPO Rali	+ 2"
9	Sergi Darder (ESP)	Caja Rural–Seguros RGA	+ 2"
10	Nicolas Vinokurov (KAZ)	XDS Astana Team	+ 2"

General classification after Stage 3
Rank	Rider	Team	Time
1	Xabier Berasategi (ESP)	Euskaltel–Euskadi	13h 53' 57"
2	Guillermo Thomas Silva (URU)	XDS Astana Team	+ 2"
3	Lorenzo Quartucci (ITA)	Burgos Burpellet BH	+ 7"
4	Thomas Pesenti (ITA)	Team Polti VisitMalta	+ 8"
5	Baptiste Veistroffer (FRA)	Lotto–Intermarché	+ 9"
6	Mathias Bregnhøj (DEN)	Terengganu Cycling Team	+ 9"
7	Nicolas Vinokurov (KAZ)	XDS Astana Team	+ 10"
8	Diego Pablo Sevilla (ESP)	Team Polti VisitMalta	+ 11"
9	Filippo Turconi (ITA)	Bardiani–CSF 7 Saber	+ 11"
10	Gotzon Martín (ESP)	Euskaltel–Euskadi	+ 12"

=== Stage 4 ===
18 April 2026 – Lingshui to Baoting, 132.7 km (82.5 mi)

Stage 4 Result
Rank	Rider	Team	Time
1	Guillermo Thomas Silva (URU)	XDS Astana Team	2h 45' 46"
2	Thomas Pesenti (ITA)	Team Polti VisitMalta	+ 0"
3	Alessandro Fancellu (ITA)	MBH Bank CSB Telecom Fort	+ 2"
4	Nicolas Vinokurov (KAZ)	XDS Astana Team	+ 2"
5	Lorenzo Quartucci (ITA)	Burgos Burpellet BH	+ 2"
6	Xabier Berasategi (ESP)	Euskaltel–Euskadi	+ 2"
7	Matteo Fabbro (ITA)	Solution Tech NIPPO Rali	+ 2"
8	Clément Alleno (FRA)	Burgos Burpellet BH	+ 2"
9	Fabrizio Crozzolo (ARG)	Team Polti VisitMalta	+ 2"
10	Mathias Bregnhøj (DEN)	Terengganu Cycling Team	+ 7"

General classification after Stage 4
Rank	Rider	Team	Time
1	Guillermo Thomas Silva (URU)	XDS Astana Team	16h 39' 35"
2	Xabier Berasategi (ESP)	Euskaltel–Euskadi	+ 10"
3	Thomas Pesenti (ITA)	Team Polti VisitMalta	+ 10"
4	Lorenzo Quartucci (ITA)	Burgos Burpellet BH	+ 17"
5	Alessandro Fancellu (ITA)	MBH Bank CSB Telecom Fort	+ 18"
6	Nicolas Vinokurov (KAZ)	XDS Astana Team	+ 20"
7	Clément Alleno (FRA)	Burgos Burpellet BH	+ 22"
8	Fabrizio Crozzolo (ARG)	Team Polti VisitMalta	+ 22"
9	Matteo Fabbro (ITA)	Solution Tech NIPPO Rali	+ 22"
10	Mathias Bregnhøj (DEN)	Terengganu Cycling Team	+ 24"

=== Stage 5 ===
19 April 2026 – Baoting to Sanya, 154.6 km (96.1 mi)

Stage 5 Result
Rank	Rider	Team	Time
1	Alexander Salby (DEN)	Li-Ning Star	3h 20' 43"
2	Dušan Rajović (SRB)	Solution Tech NIPPO Rali	+ 0"
3	Norman Vahtra (EST)	China Anta–Mentech Cycling Team	+ 0"
4	Lionel Taminiaux (BEL)	Lotto–Intermarché	+ 0"
5	Iúri Leitão (POR)	Caja Rural–Seguros RGA	+ 0"
6	Enrico Zanoncello (ITA)	Bardiani–CSF 7 Saber	+ 0"
7	Matteo Malucelli (ITA)	XDS Astana Team	+ 0"
8	Luca Colnaghi (ITA)	Bardiani–CSF 7 Saber	+ 0"
9	Oscar Gallagher (AUS)	CCACHE x BODYWRAP	+ 0"
10	Steffen De Schuyteneer (BEL)	Lotto–Intermarché	+ 0"

General classification after Stage 5
Rank	Rider	Team	Time
1	Guillermo Thomas Silva (URU)	XDS Astana Team	20h 00' 18"
2	Xabier Berasategi (ESP)	Euskaltel–Euskadi	+ 10"
3	Thomas Pesenti (ITA)	Team Polti VisitMalta	+ 10"
4	Lorenzo Quartucci (ITA)	Burgos Burpellet BH	+ 17"
5	Alessandro Fancellu (ITA)	MBH Bank CSB Telecom Fort	+ 18"
6	Nicolas Vinokurov (KAZ)	XDS Astana Team	+ 19"
7	Clément Alleno (FRA)	Burgos Burpellet BH	+ 22"
8	Fabrizio Crozzolo (ARG)	Team Polti VisitMalta	+ 22"
9	Matteo Fabbro (ITA)	Solution Tech NIPPO Rali	+ 22"
10	Mathias Bregnhøj (DEN)	Terengganu Cycling Team	+ 24"

== Classification leadership table ==
Classification leadership by stage
Stage	Winner	General classification	Points classification	Mountains classification	Team classification
1	Dušan Rajović	Dušan Rajović	Dušan Rajović	Igor Chzhan	Team Polti VisitMalta
2	Guillermo Thomas Silva	Guillermo Thomas Silva	Xabier Berasategi	Igor Chzhan	Euskaltel–Euskadi
3	Andreas Miltiadis	Xabier Berasategi	Xabier Berasategi	Igor Chzhan	Team Polti VisitMalta
4	Guillermo Thomas Silva	Guillermo Thomas Silva	Xabier Berasategi	Igor Chzhan	Team Polti VisitMalta
5	Alexander Salby	Guillermo Thomas Silva	Xabier Berasategi	Igor Chzhan	Team Polti VisitMalta
Final		Guillermo Thomas Silva	Xabier Berasategi	Igor Chzhan	Team Polti VisitMalta

== Classification standings ==
Legend
Denotes the winner of the general classification
Denotes the winner of the points classification
Denotes the winner of the mountains classification

=== General classification ===
Final general classification (1–10)
Rank	Rider	Team	Time
1	Guillermo Thomas Silva (URU)	XDS Astana Team	20h 00' 18"
2	Xabier Berasategi (ESP)	Euskaltel–Euskadi	+ 10"
3	Thomas Pesenti (ITA)	Team Polti VisitMalta	+ 10"
4	Lorenzo Quartucci (ITA)	Burgos Burpellet BH	+ 17"
5	Alessandro Fancellu (ITA)	MBH Bank CSB Telecom Fort	+ 18"
6	Nicolas Vinokurov (KAZ)	XDS Astana Team	+ 19"
7	Clément Alleno (FRA)	Burgos Burpellet BH	+ 22"
8	Fabrizio Crozzolo (ARG)	Team Polti VisitMalta	+ 22"
9	Matteo Fabbro (ITA)	Solution Tech NIPPO Rali	+ 22"
10	Mathias Bregnhøj (DEN)	Terengganu Cycling Team	+ 24"

=== Points classification ===
Final points classification (1–10)
Rank	Rider	Team	Points
1	Xabier Berasategi (ESP)	Euskaltel–Euskadi	51
2	Thomas Pesenti (ITA)	Team Polti VisitMalta	36
3	Guillermo Thomas Silva (URU)	XDS Astana Team	35
4	Daniel Cavia (ESP)	Burgos Burpellet BH	32
5	Dušan Rajović (SRB)	Solution Tech NIPPO Rali	31
6	Baptiste Veistroffer (FRA)	Lotto–Intermarché	31
7	Lorenzo Quartucci (ITA)	Burgos Burpellet BH	29
8	Matteo Malucelli (ITA)	XDS Astana Team	23
9	Andreas Miltiadis (CYP)	Quick Pro Team	22
10	Nicolas Vinokurov (KAZ)	XDS Astana Team	22

=== Mountains classification ===
Final mountains classification (1–10)
Rank	Rider	Team	Points
1	Igor Chzhan (KAZ)	Quick Pro Team	42
2	Baptiste Veistroffer (FRA)	Lotto–Intermarché	26
3	Guillermo Thomas Silva (URU)	Burgos Burpellet BH	22
4	Gao Yongbing (CHN)	FNIX–SCOM–Hengxiang Cycling Team	20
5	Fausto Masnada (ITA)	MBH Bank CSB Telecom Fort	19
6	Alessandro Fancellu (ITA)	MBH Bank CSB Telecom Fort	17
7	Gotzon Martín (ESP)	Euskaltel–Euskadi	16
8	Nils Sinschek (NED)	Li-Ning Star	14
9	Kane Richards (AUS)	Roojai Insurance Winspace	11
10	Thomas Pesenti (ITA)	Team Polti VisitMalta	10

=== Team classification ===
Final team classification (1–10)
Rank	Team	Time
1	(Italy) Team Polti VisitMalta	60h 02' 03"
2	(Spain) Burgos Burpellet BH	+ 16"
3	(Spain) Euskaltel–Euskadi	+ 51"
4	(Kazakhstan) XDS Astana Team	+ 2' 01"
5	(Hungary) MBH Bank CSB Telecom Fort	+ 2' 25"
6	(Italy) Bardiani–CSF 7 Saber	+ 4' 07"
7	(China) Wheeltop Rotor Chengdu Team	+ 7' 43"
8	(Malaysia) Terengganu Cycling Team	+ 8' 35"
9	(Estonia) Quick Pro Team	+ 10' 43"
10	(Spain) Caja Rural–Seguros RGA	+ 11' 22"
