= 2025 UCI Asia Tour =

Sports season

- Twenty-first edition of the UCI Asia Tour

Details
- Dates: 10 November 2024 – 14 October 2025
- Location: Asia
- Races: 25

The 2025 UCI Asia Tour is the 21st season of the UCI Asia Tour. The season began on 10 November 2024 with the Tour de Okinawa in Japan and ended in 14 October 2025 with Tour of Mentougou.

The points leader, based on the cumulative results of previous races, wears the UCI Asia Tour cycling jersey.

Throughout the season, points are awarded to the top finishers of stages within stage races and the final general classification standings of each of the stages races and one-day events. The quality and complexity of a race also determines how many points are awarded to the top finishers, the higher the UCI rating of a race, the more points are awarded.

The UCI race classifications from highest to lowest are as follows:

- Multi-day events: 2.1 and 2.2
- One-day events: 1.1 and 1.2

== Events ==
Races in the 2024 UCI Asia Tour
Race	Rating	Date	Winner	Team
(Japan) Tour de Okinawa	1.2	10 November 2024	Due to course flooding caused by heavy rain, Tour de Okinawa has been cancelled.	
(Indonesia) Tour de Siak	2.2	6–8 December 2024	Jack Drage (NZL)	Garuda Development
(United Arab Emirates) Tour of Sharjah	2.2	24–28 January 2025	Josh Kench (NZL)	Li-Ning Star
(Saudi Arabia) AlUla Tour	2.1	28 January – 1 February 2025	Tom Pidcock (GBR)	Q36.5 Pro Cycling Team
(Oman) Muscat Classic	1.1	7 February 2025	Rick Pluimers (NED)	Tudor Pro Cycling Team
(Chinese Taipei) Tour de Taiwan	2.1	16–20 March 2025	Brady Gilmore (AUS)	Israel–Premier Tech
Tour of Thailand	2.1	24–29 March 2025	Alexander Salby (DEN)	Li-Ning Star
(Uzbekistan) Tour of Bostonliq	2.2	28–30 April 2025	Josh Kench (NZL)	Li-Ning Star
(Japan) Tour de Kumano	2.2	8–11 May 2025	Mark Stewart (GBR)	Team Solution Tech–Vini Fantini
Tour of Japan	2.2	18–25 May 2025	Alessandro Fancellu (ITA)	Team UKYO
Tour of Azerbaijan (Iran)	2.1	27–31 May 2025	Saeid Safarzadeh (IRI)	Iran (national team)
(South Korea) Tour de Gyeongnam	2.2	4–8 June 2025	Dylan Hopkins (AUS)	Roojai Insurance
(China) Yellow River Estuary Road Cycling Race	2.2	14–15 June 2025	Cristian Pita (ECU)	Huansheng–Vonoa–Taishan Sport Cycling Team
(Japan) The Road Race Tokyo Tama	1.2	13 July 2025	Lorenzo Quartucci (ITA)	Team Solution Tech–Vini Fantini
(Indonesia) Tour de Banyuwangi Ijen	2.2	28–31 July 2025	Benjamín Prades (ESP)	VC Fukuoka
(China) Trans-Himalaya Cycling Race	2.1	7–10 August 2025	Raman Tsishkou	Li-Ning Star
(Oman) Dhofar Classic	1.2	6 September	(United Arab Emirates) Mohammad Al Mutaiwei	United Arab Emirates (national team)
(China) Tour of Shanghai	2.2	5–7 September 2025	Dušan Rajović (SRB)	Team Solution Tech–Vini Fantini
(Oman) Tour of Salalah	2.2	7–10 September 2025	Adne van Engelen (NED)	Terengganu Cycling Team
(China) Tour of Binzhou	1.1	9 September	Simon Pellaud (SUI)	Li-Ning Star
(China) Tour of Poyang Lake	2.2	15–26 September 2025	Petr Rikunov	Chengdu DYC Cycling Team
(China) Tour of Huangshan	2.2	19–21 September 2025	Daniel Cavia (ESP)	Burgos Burpellet BH
(Japan) Oita Urban Classic Road Race	1.2	5 October 2025	Elliot Schultz (AUS)	Victoire Hiroshima
(Japan) Tour de Kyushu	2.1	11–13 October 2025	None (Note: Kyrylo Tsarenko (UKR) from Team Solution Tech–Vini Fantini was the original winner of this race, but after it was revealed that he accepted a one year period of ineligiblity from 1 July 2025 until 30 June 2026 for his role in anti doping rule violation, all of his results from 1 July 2025 until 3 December 2025 were voided, including his win in Tour de Kyushu.)	
(China) Tour of Mentougou International Road Cycling Race	2.2	12–14 October 2025	Clément Alleno (FRA)	Burgos Burpellet BH
