= 2023 Tour of Qinghai Lake =

Chinese cycling race

2023 UCI ProSeries

Race details
- Dates: 9–16 July 2023
- Stages: 8
- Winning time: 31h 14' 57"

Results
Jersey awarded to the overall winner	Winner	Henok Mulubrhan (ERI)	(Green Project–Bardiani–CSF–Faizanè)
	Second	Eric Fagúndez (URU)	(Burgos BH)
	Third	Davide Baldaccini (ITA)	(Team Corratec–Selle Italia)
Jersey awarded to the points classification winner	Points	Henok Mulubrhan (ERI)	(Green Project–Bardiani–CSF–Faizanè)
Jersey awarded to the mountains classification winner	Mountains	Alessio Nieri (ITA)	(Green Project–Bardiani–CSF–Faizanè)
	Team	(Italy) Green Project–Bardiani–CSF–Faizanè	

The 2023 Tour of Qinghai Lake was a road cycling stage race that took place between 9 and 16 July 2023 in China. The race was rated as a category 2.Pro event on the 2023 UCI ProSeries calendar, and was the 21st edition of the Tour of Qinghai Lake. It was the first time the race appeared on the ProSeries calendar, despite initially intended to have been a ProSeries event since 2020.

== Teams ==
Five UCI ProTeams, fourteen UCI Continental teams, and three national teams made up the 22 teams that participated in the race.

UCI ProTeams

- Bolton Equities Black Spoke
- Burgos BH
- Euskaltel–Euskadi
- Green Project–Bardiani–CSF–Faizanè
- Team Corratec–Selle Italia

UCI Continental Teams

- 7 Eleven–Cliqq–air21 by Roadbike Philippines
- ABLOC CT
- Bodywrap LTwoo Cycling Team
- China Glory Continental Cycling Team
- Li-Ning Star
- Nusantara Cycling Team
- Shandong Green Orange Continental Team
- Shenzhen Xidesheng Cycling Team
- St George Continental Cycling Team
- Tarteletto–Isorex
- Team Coop–Repsol
- Team Medellín–EPM
- The Hurricane & Thunder Cycling Team
- Tianyoude Hotel Cycling Team

National Teams

- China
- Mongolia
- Thailand

== Route ==
Stage characteristics and winners
Stage	Date	Course	Distance	Type	Stage winner
1	9 July	Xining to Xining	108.8 km (67.6 mi)	Flat stage	Timothy Dupont (BEL)
2	10 July	Duoba to Guide	132.35 km (82.24 mi)	Hilly stage	Nils Sinschek (NED)
3	11 July	Guide to Huzhu	201.12 km (124.97 mi)	Intermediate stage	Davide Baldaccini (ITA)
4	12 July	Huzhu to Menyuan	188.69 km (117.25 mi)	Flat stage	Frank van den Broek (NED)
5	13 July	Menyuan to Qilian	170 km (110 mi)	Hilly stage	Enrico Zanoncello (ITA)
6	14 July	Qilian to Xihaizhen	205.95 km (127.97 mi)	Hilly stage	Attilio Viviani (ITA)
7	15 July	Xihaizhen to Gonghe	127.25 km (79.07 mi)	Hilly stage	Henok Mulubrhan (ERI)
8	16 July	Gonghe to Chaka	200.27 km (124.44 mi)	Flat stage	Timothy Dupont (BEL)
Total			1,338.43 km (831.66 mi)		

== Stages ==
=== Stage 1 ===
9 July 2023 — Xining to Xining, 108.8 km (67.6 mi)

Stage 1 Result
Rank	Rider	Team	Time
1	Timothy Dupont (BEL)	Tarteletto–Isorex	2h 15' 10"
2	Mārtiņš Pluto (LAT)	ABLOC CT	+ 0"
3	Attilio Viviani (ITA)	Team Corratec–Selle Italia	+ 0"
4	Jiang Zhi Hui (CHN)	Li-Ning Star	+ 0"
5	Henok Mulubrhan (ERI)	Green Project–Bardiani–CSF–Faizanè	+ 0"
6	Luke Mudgway (NZL)	Bolton Equities Black Spoke	+ 0"
7	Miguel Ángel Fernández (ESP)	Burgos BH	+ 0"
8	Wilmar Paredes (COL)	Team Medellín–EPM	+ 0"
9	Jelle Johannink (NED)	ABLOC CT	+ 0"
10	Andoni López de Abetxuko (ESP)	Euskaltel–Euskadi	+ 0"

General classification after Stage 1
Rank	Rider	Team	Time
1	Timothy Dupont (BEL)	Tarteletto–Isorex	2h 15' 10"
2	Mārtiņš Pluto (LAT)	ABLOC CT	+ 4"
3	Nils Sinschek (NED)	ABLOC CT	+ 4"
4	Attilio Viviani (ITA)	Team Corratec–Selle Italia	+ 6"
5	Martijn Rasenberg (NED)	ABLOC CT	+ 6"
6	Roniel Campos (VEN)	Li-Ning Star	+ 7"
7	Danny Osorio (COL)	Team Medellín–EPM	+ 8"
8	Thanakhan Chaiyasombat (THA)	Thailand	+ 9"
9	Enkhtaivan Bolor-Erdene (MNG)	Mongolia	+ 9"
10	André Drege (NOR)	Team Coop–Repsol	+ 9"

=== Stage 2 ===
10 July 2023 — Duoba to Guide, 132.35 km (82.24 mi)

Stage 2 Result
Rank	Rider	Team	Time
1	Nils Sinschek (NED)	ABLOC CT	3h 08' 24"
2	Anton Stensby (NOR)	Team Coop–Repsol	+ 3"
3	Wilmar Paredes (COL)	Team Medellín–EPM	+ 3"
4	Enrico Zanoncello (ITA)	Green Project–Bardiani–CSF–Faizanè	+ 50"
5	Lü Xianjing (CHN)	China Glory Continental Cycling Team	+ 50"
6	Henok Mulubrhan (ERI)	Green Project–Bardiani–CSF–Faizanè	+ 50"
7	Dylan Sunderland (AUS)	St George Continental Cycling Team	+ 50"
8	Óscar Sevilla (ESP)	Team Medellín–EPM	+ 50"
9	Andoni López de Abetxuko (ESP)	Euskaltel–Euskadi	+ 50"
10	Roniel Campos (VEN)	Li-Ning Star	+ 50"

General classification after Stage 2
Rank	Rider	Team	Time
1	Nils Sinschek (NED)	ABLOC CT	5h 23' 12"
2	Anton Stensby (NOR)	Team Coop–Repsol	+ 15"
3	Wilmar Paredes (COL)	Team Medellín–EPM	+ 21"
4	Roniel Campos (VEN)	Li-Ning Star	+ 1' 09"
5	Danny Osorio (COL)	Team Medellín–EPM	+ 1' 10"
6	Henok Mulubrhan (ERI)	Green Project–Bardiani–CSF–Faizanè	+ 1' 12"
7	Andoni López de Abetxuko (ESP)	Euskaltel–Euskadi	+ 1' 12"
8	Enrico Zanoncello (ITA)	Green Project–Bardiani–CSF–Faizanè	+ 1' 12"
9	Willie Smit (RSA)	China Glory Continental Cycling Team	+ 1' 12"
10	Logan Currie (NZL)	Bolton Equities Black Spoke	+ 1' 12"

=== Stage 3 ===
11 July 2023 — Guide to Huzhu, 201.12 km (124.97 mi)

Stage 3 Result
Rank	Rider	Team	Time
1	Davide Baldaccini (ITA)	Team Corratec–Selle Italia	5h 17' 56"
2	Eric Fagúndez (URU)	Burgos BH	+ 1"
3	André Drege (NOR)	Team Coop–Repsol	+ 8"
4	Henok Mulubrhan (ERI)	Green Project–Bardiani–CSF–Faizanè	+ 8"
5	Luke Mudgway (NZL)	Bolton Equities Black Spoke	+ 8"
6	Wilmar Paredes (COL)	Team Medellín–EPM	+ 8"
7	Lü Xianjing (CHN)	China Glory Continental Cycling Team	+ 8"
8	Joan Bou (ESP)	Euskaltel–Euskadi	+ 8"
9	Jacob Relaes (BEL)	Tarteletto–Isorex	+ 8"
10	Ibai Azurmendi (ESP)	Euskaltel–Euskadi	+ 8"

General classification after Stage 3
Rank	Rider	Team	Time
1	Wilmar Paredes (COL)	Team Medellín–EPM	10h 41' 34"
2	Davide Baldaccini (ITA)	Team Corratec–Selle Italia	+ 36"
3	Eric Fagúndez (URU)	Burgos BH	+ 41"
4	Henok Mulubrhan (ERI)	Green Project–Bardiani–CSF–Faizanè	+ 51"
5	Logan Currie (NZL)	Bolton Equities Black Spoke	+ 51"
6	Óscar Sevilla (ESP)	Team Medellín–EPM	+ 51"
7	Roniel Campos (VEN)	Li-Ning Star	+ 51"
8	Danny Osorio (COL)	Team Medellín–EPM	+ 52"
9	Willie Smit (RSA)	China Glory Continental Cycling Team	+ 54"
10	Lü Xianjing (CHN)	China Glory Continental Cycling Team	+ 54"

=== Stage 4 ===
12 July 2023 — Huzhu to Menyuan, 188.69 km (117.25 mi)

Stage 4 Result
Rank	Rider	Team	Time
1	Frank van den Broek (NED)	ABLOC CT	4h 40' 50"
2	Stefano Gandin (ITA)	Team Corratec–Selle Italia	+ 1' 52"
3	Timothy Dupont (BEL)	Tarteletto–Isorex	+ 2' 40"
4	Miguel Ángel Fernández (ESP)	Burgos BH	+ 2' 40"
5	Bilguunjargal Erdenebat (MNG)	Mongolia	+ 2' 40"
6	Lü Xianjing (CHN)	China Glory Continental Cycling Team	+ 2' 40"
7	Andoni López de Abetxuko (ESP)	Euskaltel–Euskadi	+ 2' 40"
8	Martijn Rasenberg (NED)	ABLOC CT	+ 2' 40"
9	Enrico Zanoncello (ITA)	Green Project–Bardiani–CSF–Faizanè	+ 2' 40"
10	Luca Colnaghi (ITA)	Green Project–Bardiani–CSF–Faizanè	+ 2' 40"

General classification after Stage 4
Rank	Rider	Team	Time
1	Wilmar Paredes (COL)	Team Medellín–EPM	15h 25' 04"
2	Davide Baldaccini (ITA)	Team Corratec–Selle Italia	+ 36"
3	Eric Fagúndez (URU)	Burgos BH	+ 41"
4	Henok Mulubrhan (ERI)	Green Project–Bardiani–CSF–Faizanè	+ 50"
5	Logan Currie (NZL)	Bolton Equities Black Spoke	+ 51"
6	Óscar Sevilla (ESP)	Team Medellín–EPM	+ 51"
7	Roniel Campos (VEN)	Li-Ning Star	+ 51"
8	Lü Xianjing (CHN)	China Glory Continental Cycling Team	+ 54"
9	Willie Smit (RSA)	China Glory Continental Cycling Team	+ 54"
10	Ibai Azurmendi (ESP)	Euskaltel–Euskadi	+ 54"

=== Stage 5 ===
13 July 2023 — Menyuan to Qilian, 170 km (110 mi)

Stage 5 Result
Rank	Rider	Team	Time
1	Enrico Zanoncello (ITA)	Green Project–Bardiani–CSF–Faizanè	4h 03' 06"
2	Andoni López de Abetxuko (ESP)	Euskaltel–Euskadi	+ 0"
3	Jelle Johannink (NED)	ABLOC CT	+ 0"
4	Attilio Viviani (ITA)	Team Corratec–Selle Italia	+ 0"
5	Luca Colnaghi (ITA)	Green Project–Bardiani–CSF–Faizanè	+ 0"
6	Luke Mudgway (NZL)	Bolton Equities Black Spoke	+ 0"
7	Henok Mulubrhan (ERI)	Green Project–Bardiani–CSF–Faizanè	+ 0"
8	Miguel Ángel Fernández (ESP)	Burgos BH	+ 0"
9	Joan Bou (ESP)	Euskaltel–Euskadi	+ 0"
10	Nicolas Dalla Valle (ITA)	Team Corratec–Selle Italia	+ 0"

General classification after Stage 5
Rank	Rider	Team	Time
1	Wilmar Paredes (COL)	Team Medellín–EPM	19h 28' 10"
2	Davide Baldaccini (ITA)	Team Corratec–Selle Italia	+ 36"
3	Eric Fagúndez (URU)	Burgos BH	+ 41"
4	Óscar Sevilla (ESP)	Team Medellín–EPM	+ 48"
5	Henok Mulubrhan (ERI)	Green Project–Bardiani–CSF–Faizanè	+ 50"
6	Logan Currie (NZL)	Bolton Equities Black Spoke	+ 51"
7	Roniel Campos (VEN)	Li-Ning Star	+ 51"
8	Joan Bou (ESP)	Euskaltel–Euskadi	+ 52"
9	Lü Xianjing (CHN)	China Glory Continental Cycling Team	+ 54"
10	Willie Smit (RSA)	China Glory Continental Cycling Team	+ 54"

=== Stage 6 ===
14 July 2023 — Qilian to Xihaizhen, 205.95 km (127.97 mi)

Stage 6 Result
Rank	Rider	Team	Time
1	Attilio Viviani (ITA)	Team Corratec–Selle Italia	4h 53' 34"
2	Timothy Dupont (BEL)	Tarteletto–Isorex	+ 0"
3	Enrico Zanoncello (ITA)	Green Project–Bardiani–CSF–Faizanè	+ 0"
4	Miguel Ángel Fernández (ESP)	Burgos BH	+ 0"
5	Wang Kuicheng (CHN)	Bodywrap LTwoo Cycling Team	+ 0"
6	Henok Mulubrhan (ERI)	Green Project–Bardiani–CSF–Faizanè	+ 0"
7	Martijn Rasenberg (NED)	ABLOC CT	+ 0"
8	Anton Stensby (NOR)	Team Coop–Repsol	+ 0"
9	Nicolas Dalla Valle (ITA)	Team Corratec–Selle Italia	+ 0"
10	Willie Smit (RSA)	China Glory Continental Cycling Team	+ 0"

General classification after Stage 6
Rank	Rider	Team	Time
1	Wilmar Paredes (COL)	Team Medellín–EPM	24h 21' 44"
2	Davide Baldaccini (ITA)	Team Corratec–Selle Italia	+ 36"
3	Eric Fagúndez (URU)	Burgos BH	+ 41"
4	Óscar Sevilla (ESP)	Team Medellín–EPM	+ 48"
5	Henok Mulubrhan (ERI)	Green Project–Bardiani–CSF–Faizanè	+ 50"
6	Logan Currie (NZL)	Bolton Equities Black Spoke	+ 51"
7	Roniel Campos (VEN)	Li-Ning Star	+ 51"
8	Joan Bou (ESP)	Euskaltel–Euskadi	+ 52"
9	Willie Smit (RSA)	China Glory Continental Cycling Team	+ 54"
10	Lü Xianjing (CHN)	China Glory Continental Cycling Team	+ 54"

=== Stage 7 ===
15 July 2023 — Xihaizhen to Gonghe, 127.25 km (79.07 mi)

Stage 7 Result
Rank	Rider	Team	Time
1	Henok Mulubrhan (ERI)	Green Project–Bardiani–CSF–Faizanè	2h 54' 19"
2	Myagmarsuren Baansankhuu (MNG)	Mongolia	+ 0"
3	Eric Fagúndez (URU)	Burgos BH	+ 0"
4	Martijn Rasenberg (NED)	ABLOC CT	+ 0"
5	Riccardo Lucca (ITA)	Green Project–Bardiani–CSF–Faizanè	+ 6"
6	Andrés Ardila (COL)	Burgos BH	+ 9"
7	Mario Aparicio (ESP)	Burgos BH	+ 51"
8	Luke Mudgway (NZL)	Bolton Equities Black Spoke	+ 1' 17"
9	Rodrigo Álvarez (ESP)	Burgos BH	+ 1' 17"
10	Enrico Zanoncello (ITA)	Green Project–Bardiani–CSF–Faizanè	+ 1' 17"

General classification after Stage 7
Rank	Rider	Team	Time
1	Eric Fagúndez (URU)	Burgos BH	27h 16' 40"
2	Henok Mulubrhan (ERI)	Green Project–Bardiani–CSF–Faizanè	+ 3"
3	Mario Aparicio (ESP)	Burgos BH	+ 1' 08"
4	Davide Baldaccini (ITA)	Team Corratec–Selle Italia	+ 1' 16"
5	Riccardo Lucca (ITA)	Green Project–Bardiani–CSF–Faizanè	+ 1' 23"
6	Óscar Sevilla (ESP)	Team Medellín–EPM	+ 1' 28"
7	Roniel Campos (VEN)	Li-Ning Star	+ 1' 31"
8	Joan Bou (ESP)	Euskaltel–Euskadi	+ 1' 32"
9	Willie Smit (RSA)	China Glory Continental Cycling Team	+ 1' 34"
10	Magnus Wæhre (NOR)	Team Coop–Repsol	+ 1' 34"

=== Stage 8 ===
16 July 2023 — Gonghe to Chaka, 200.27 km (124.44 mi)

Stage 8 Result
Rank	Rider	Team	Time
1	Timothy Dupont (BEL)	Tarteletto–Isorex	3h 57' 50"
2	Victor Ocampo (COL)	Team Medellín–EPM	+ 0"
3	Luke Mudgway (NZL)	Bolton Equities Black Spoke	+ 0"
4	Willie Smit (RSA)	China Glory Continental Cycling Team	+ 0"
5	Martijn Rasenberg (NED)	ABLOC CT	+ 0"
6	Antonio Jesús Soto (ESP)	Euskaltel–Euskadi	+ 0"
7	Davide Baldaccini (ITA)	Team Corratec–Selle Italia	+ 0"
8	Lorenzo Quartucci (ITA)	Team Corratec–Selle Italia	+ 0"
9	Marco Murgano (ITA)	Team Corratec–Selle Italia	+ 0"
10	Stefano Gandin (ITA)	Team Corratec–Selle Italia	+ 5"

General classification after Stage 8
Rank	Rider	Team	Time
1	Henok Mulubrhan (ERI)	Green Project–Bardiani–CSF–Faizanè	31h 14' 57"
2	Eric Fagúndez (URU)	Burgos BH	+ 0"
3	Davide Baldaccini (ITA)	Team Corratec–Selle Italia	+ 49"
4	Marco Murgano (ITA)	Team Corratec–Selle Italia	+ 1' 02"
5	Willie Smit (RSA)	China Glory Continental Cycling Team	+ 1' 07"
6	Mario Aparicio (ESP)	Burgos BH	+ 1' 07"
7	Cedrik Bakke Christophersen (NOR)	Team Coop–Repsol	+ 1' 14"
8	Magnus Wæhre (NOR)	Team Coop–Repsol	+ 1' 15"
9	Josh Kench (NZL)	Bolton Equities Black Spoke	+ 1' 17"
10	Óscar Sevilla (ESP)	Team Medellín–EPM	+ 1' 24"

== Classification leadership table ==
Classification leadership by stage
Stage	Winner	General classification	Points classification	Mountains classification	Asian rider classification	Team classification
1	Timothy Dupont	Timothy Dupont	Timothy Dupont	not awarded	Thanakhan Chaiyasombat	Burgos BH
2	Nils Sinschek	Nils Sinschek	Nils Sinschek	Wilmar Paredes	Lü Xianjing	Team Coop–Repsol
3	Davide Baldaccini	Wilmar Paredes	Henok Mulubrhan	Alessio Nieri	Lü Xianjing	Team Coop–Repsol
4	Frank van den Broek	Wilmar Paredes	Henok Mulubrhan	Alessio Nieri	Lü Xianjing	Team Coop–Repsol
5	Enrico Zanoncello	Wilmar Paredes	Henok Mulubrhan	Alessio Nieri	Lü Xianjing	Team Coop–Repsol
6	Attilio Viviani	Wilmar Paredes	Henok Mulubrhan	Alessio Nieri	Lü Xianjing	Team Coop–Repsol
7	Henok Mulubrhan	Eric Fagúndez	Henok Mulubrhan	Alessio Nieri	Saeid Safarzadeh	Green Project–Bardiani–CSF–Faizanè
8	Timothy Dupont	Henok Mulubrhan	Henok Mulubrhan	Alessio Nieri	Saeid Safarzadeh	Green Project–Bardiani–CSF–Faizanè
Final		Henok Mulubrhan	Henok Mulubrhan	Alessio Nieri	Saeid Safarzadeh	Green Project–Bardiani–CSF–Faizanè

== Final classification standings ==
Legend
Denotes the winner of the general classification	Denotes the winner of the mountains classification
Denotes the winner of the points classification	Denotes the winner of the Asian rider classification

=== General classification ===
Final general classification (1–10)
Rank	Rider	Team	Time
1	Henok Mulubrhan (ERI)	Green Project–Bardiani–CSF–Faizanè	31h 14' 57"
2	Eric Fagúndez (URU)	Burgos BH	+ 0"
3	Davide Baldaccini (ITA)	Team Corratec–Selle Italia	+ 49"
4	Marco Murgano (ITA)	Team Corratec–Selle Italia	+ 1' 02"
5	Willie Smit (RSA)	China Glory Continental Cycling Team	+ 1' 07"
6	Mario Aparicio (ESP)	Burgos BH	+ 1' 07"
7	Cedrik Bakke Christophersen (NOR)	Team Coop–Repsol	+ 1' 14"
8	Magnus Wæhre (NOR)	Team Coop–Repsol	+ 1' 15"
9	Josh Kench (NZL)	Bolton Equities Black Spoke	+ 1' 17"
10	Óscar Sevilla (ESP)	Team Medellín–EPM	+ 1' 24"

=== Points classification ===
Final points classification (1–10)
Rank	Rider	Team	Points
1	Henok Mulubrhan (ERI)	Green Project–Bardiani–CSF–Faizanè	75
2	Timothy Dupont (BEL)	Tarteletto–Isorex	69
3	Luke Mudgway (NZL)	Bolton Equities Black Spoke	58
4	Enrico Zanoncello (ITA)	Green Project–Bardiani–CSF–Faizanè	54
5	Martijn Rasenberg (NED)	ABLOC CT	53
6	Attilio Viviani (ITA)	Team Corratec–Selle Italia	44
7	Andoni López de Abetxuko (ESP)	Euskaltel–Euskadi	41
8	Nils Sinschek (NED)	ABLOC CT	36
9	Willie Smit (RSA)	China Glory Continental Cycling Team	35
10	Wilmar Paredes (COL)	Team Medellín–EPM	35

=== Mountains classification ===
Final mountains classification (1–10)
Rank	Rider	Team	Points
1	Alessio Nieri (ITA)	Green Project–Bardiani–CSF–Faizanè	18
2	Danny Osorio (COL)	Team Medellín–EPM	15
3	Henok Mulubrhan (ERI)	Green Project–Bardiani–CSF–Faizanè	13
4	Martijn Rasenberg (NED)	ABLOC CT	11
5	Wilmar Paredes (COL)	Team Medellín–EPM	10
6	Anton Stensby (NOR)	Team Coop–Repsol	10
7	Andrés Ardila (COL)	Burgos BH	10
8	Óscar Sevilla (ESP)	Team Medellín–EPM	9
9	Myagmarsuren Baasankhuu (MNG)	Mongolia	8
10	Joan Bou (ESP)	Euskaltel–Euskadi	7

=== Asian rider classification ===
Final Asian rider classification (1–10)
Rank	Rider	Team	Time
1	Saeid Safarzadeh (IRN)	Tianyoude Hotel Cycling Team	31h 16' 32"
2	Shao Junqi (CHN)	Li-Ning Star	+ 33' 58"
3	Li Yuheng (CHN)	Shenzhen Xidesheng Cycling Team	+ 43' 31"
4	Wang Kuicheng (CHN)	Bodywrap LTwoo Cycling Team	+ 49' 25"
5	Bilguunjargal Erdenebat (MNG)	Mongolia	+ 52' 39"
6	Zhang Zhishan (CHN)	Tianyoude Hotel Cycling Team	+ 1h 00' 49"
7	Liu Jinchun (CHN)	Shenzhen Xidesheng Cycling Team	+ 1h 13' 58"
8	Myagmarsuren Baasankhuu (MNG)	Mongolia	+ 1h 21' 50"
9	Shen Yutao (CHN)	China	+ 1h 27' 10"
10	Wang Jiancai (CHN)	Tianyoude Hotel Cycling Team	+ 1h 34' 13"

=== Team classification ===
Final team classification (1–10)
Rank	Team	Time
1	(Italy) Green Project–Bardiani–CSF–Faizanè	93h 48' 53"
2	(New Zealand) Bolton Equities Black Spoke	+ 1' 00"
3	(Norway) Team Coop–Repsol	+ 1' 15"
4	(Colombia) Team Medellín–EPM	+ 4' 48"
5	China Glory Continental Cycling Team	+ 6' 57"
6	(Spain) Euskaltel–Euskadi	+ 11' 22"
7	(Italy) Team Corratec–Selle Italia	+ 32' 18"
8	(Spain) Burgos BH	+ 38' 39"
9	(China) Tianyoude Hotel Cycling Team	+ 52' 08"
10	(Belgium) Tarteletto–Isorex	+ 1h 19' 08"
