= 2024 Tour of Slovenia =

2024 UCI ProSeries

Race details
- Dates: 12–16 June 2024
- Stages: 5
- Distance: 848.3 km (527.1 mi)
- Winning time: 20h 10′ 36″

Results
Jersey awarded to the overall winner	Winner	Giovanni Aleotti (ITA)	(Bora–Hansgrohe)
	Second	Pello Bilbao (ESP)	(Team Bahrain Victorious)
	Third	Giulio Pellizzari (ITA)	(VF Group–Bardiani–CSF–Faizanè)
Jersey awarded to the points classification winner	Points	Giovanni Aleotti (ITA)	(Bora–Hansgrohe)
Jersey awarded to the mountains classification winner	Mountains	Davide Baldaccini (ITA)	(Team Corratec–Vini Fantini)
Jersey awarded to the young rider classification winner	Young rider	Giulio Pellizzari (ITA)	(VF Group–Bardiani–CSF–Faizanè)
	Team	(Italy) VF Group–Bardiani–CSF–Faizanè	

The 2024 Tour of Slovenia (Slovene: Dirka po Sloveniji) was the 30th edition of the Tour of Slovenia stage race, held between 12 and 16 June 2024. The 2.Pro-category race was part of the UCI ProSeries. The race finished, as it has traditionally, in Novo Mesto. The tour consisted of five stages.

The 1st stage was held in Slovenia's eastern regions of Prekmurje and Styria, but crossed Slovenia's borders thrice to neighboring countries Austria, Hungary, and Croatia, making it the first road cycling single stage in history to be held in 4 different countries. After the tour crossed the Italian border in the 3rd stage, the race had been held in a total of five countries, also the first time ever.

Italian cyclist Giovanni Aleotti won the race (and points classification) in front of Pello Bilbao and Giulio Pellizzari (youth classification).

== Teams ==
A record 23 teams (7 UCI WorldTeams, 11 UCI ProTeams and 5 UCI Continental) from a record of 31 countries started the race.

UCI WorldTeams

- Bora–Hansgrohe
- EF Education–EasyPost
- Groupama–FDJ
- INEOS Grenadiers
- Team Bahrain Victorious
- Team Jayco–AlUla
- UAE Team Emirates

UCI ProTeams

- Bingoal WB
- Caja Rural–Seguros RGA
- Equipo Kern Pharma
- Euskaltel–Euskadi
- Polti–Kometa
- Q36.5 Pro Cycling Team
- Team Corratec–Vini Fantini
- Team TotalEnergies
- Tudor Pro Cycling Team
- Uno-X Mobility
- VF Group–Bardiani–CSF–Faizanè

UCI Continental Teams

- Adria Mobil
- Ljubljana Gusto Santic
- Pierre Baguette Cycling
- Santic–Wibatech
- Sava Kranj Cycling

== Route ==
Stage characteristics and winners
Stage	Date	Course	Distance	Elevation gain	Type	Stage winner
1	12 June	Murska Sobota to Ormož	205.8 km (127.9 mi); ~~191.9 km (119.2 mi)~~	901 m (2,956 ft)	Flat stage	Dylan Groenewegen (NED)
2	13 June	Žalec to Rogaška Slatina	177.9 km (110.5 mi)	2,480 m (8,140 ft)	Flat stage	Phil Bauhaus (GER)
3	14 June	Ljubljana to Nova Gorica	160.5 km (99.7 mi)	2,771 m (9,091 ft)	Hilly stage	Giovanni Aleotti (ITA)
4	15 June	Škofljica to Krvavec	147.2 km (91.5 mi)	2,928 m (9,606 ft)	Mountain stage	Pello Bilbao (ESP)
5	16 June	Šentjernej to Novo Mesto	156.9 km (97.5 mi)	1,874 m (6,148 ft)	Hilly stage	Ben Healy (IRL)
Total			848.3 km (527.1 mi); ~~834.4 km (518.5 mi)~~	10,954 m (35,938 ft)		

== Stages ==
=== Stage 1 ===
12 June 2024 — Murska Sobota to Ormož, ~~191.9 km (119.2 mi)~~ 205.8 km (127.9 mi)

The organizers announced in the morning hours that due to the effects of storms, they were forced to slightly adjust the route of the stage. Halfway through the originally planned 191.9 km (119.2 mi)-long stage, between the 99th and 111th kilometers, there were floods, so the cyclists had to cross the Mura river near Veržej instead of the originally planned crossing between Črenšovci and Ormož. Compared to the original route, the stage was redirected and consequently extended for 13.9 km to 205.8 km in total. As a result, the cyclists were made to set off five minutes earlier than the originally scheduled start, i.e. at 11:10 a.m. instead of 11:15 a.m., and expected a few minutes later at the finish line.

The stage crossed the Slovenian border for the first time, at Cankova to Austria, staying in Austria for 6 km., passing the town of Bad Radkersburg before returning to Slovenia at Gornja Radgona. The second time the tour crossed the Slovenian border was towards Hungary, staying in Hungary for another 6 km., passing Lenti-Rédics before returning to Slovenia at Lendava. The third and last time the tour crossed the Slovenian border was into Croatia, staying in Croatia for 10 km., passing the municipality of Cestica before returning to Slovenia at Zavrč.

There was only one categorized climb (4th category), 4.5 km long on top of Jeruzalem, with 3% average and 9.4% maximum incline.

Stage 1 Result
Rank	Rider	Team	Time
1	Dylan Groenewegen (NED)	Team Jayco–AlUla	4h 35' 00"
2	Alexander Kristoff (NOR)	Uno-X Mobility	+ 0"
3	Phil Bauhaus (GER)	Team Bahrain Victorious	+ 0"
4	Giovanni Lonardi (ITA)	Polti–Kometa	+ 0"
5	Sam Welsford (AUS)	Bora–Hansgrohe	+ 0"
6	Alberto Dainese (ITA)	Tudor Pro Cycling Team	+ 0"
7	Sandy Dujardin (FRA)	Team TotalEnergies	+ 0"
8	Marc Brustenga (ESP)	Equipo Kern Pharma	+ 0"
9	Louis Blouwe (BEL)	Bingoal WB	+ 0"
10	Paul Penhoët (FRA)	Groupama–FDJ	+ 0"

General classification after Stage 1
Rank	Rider	Team	Time
1	Dylan Groenewegen (NED)	Team Jayco–AlUla	4h 34' 50"
2	Alexander Kristoff (NOR)	Uno-X Mobility	+ 4"
3	Phil Bauhaus (GER)	Team Bahrain Victorious	+ 6"
4	Jhonatan Narváez (ECU)	INEOS Grenadiers	+ 7"
5	Ben Healy (IRL)	EF Education–EasyPost	+ 8"
6	Matej Mohorič (SLO)	Team Bahrain Victorious	+ 8"
7	Domen Novak (SLO)	UAE Team Emirates	+ 8"
8	Szymon Tracz (POL)	Santic–Wibatech	+ 8"
9	Dylan Hopkins (AUS)	Ljubljana Gusto Santic	+ 9"
10	Giovanni Lonardi (ITA)	Polti–Kometa	+ 10"

=== Stage 2 ===
13 June 2024 — Žalec to Rogaška Slatina, 177.9 km (110.5 mi)

There was only one categorized climb (2nd category), 7.6 km long on Celjska koča (721 m) above Celje, at 6.3% average and 9% max. incline.

Stage 2 Result
Rank	Rider	Team	Time
1	Phil Bauhaus (GER)	Team Bahrain Victorious	4h 26' 08"
2	Alberto Dainese (ITA)	Tudor Pro Cycling Team	+ 0"
3	Luka Mezgec (SLO)	Team Jayco–AlUla	+ 0"
4	Jonas Koch (GER)	Bora–Hansgrohe	+ 0"
5	Jhonatan Narváez (ECU)	INEOS Grenadiers	+ 0"
6	Alessandro Covi (ITA)	UAE Team Emirates	+ 0"
7	Filippo Fiorelli (ITA)	VF Group–Bardiani–CSF–Faizanè	+ 0"
8	Giovanni Lonardi (ITA)	Polti–Kometa	+ 0"
9	Matteo Moschetti (ITA)	Q36.5 Pro Cycling Team	+ 0"
10	Orluis Aular (VEN)	Caja Rural–Seguros RGA	+ 0"

General classification after Stage 2
Rank	Rider	Team	Time
1	Phil Bauhaus (GER)	Team Bahrain Victorious	9h 00' 54"
2	Alberto Dainese (ITA)	Tudor Pro Cycling Team	+ 8"
3	Alexander Kristoff (NOR)	Uno-X Mobility	+ 8"
4	Martin Marcellusi (ITA)	VF Group–Bardiani–CSF–Faizanè	+ 9"
5	Luka Mezgec (SLO)	Team Jayco–AlUla	+ 10"
6	Jhonatan Narváez (ECU)	INEOS Grenadiers	+ 11"
7	Ben Healy (IRL)	EF Education–EasyPost	+ 12"
8	Domen Novak (SLO)	UAE Team Emirates	+ 12"
9	Mikkel Frølich Honoré (DEN)	EF Education–EasyPost	+ 12"
10	Matej Mohorič (SLO)	Team Bahrain Victorious	+ 12"

=== Stage 3 ===
14 June 2024 — Ljubljana to Nova Gorica, 160.5 km (99.7 mi)

Stage 3 Result
Rank	Rider	Team	Time
1	Giovanni Aleotti (ITA)	Bora–Hansgrohe	3h 46' 19"
2	Jhonatan Narváez (ECU)	INEOS Grenadiers	+ 11"
3	Jordan Jegat (FRA)	Team TotalEnergies	+ 11"
4	Filippo Zana (ITA)	Team Jayco–AlUla	+ 11"
5	Giulio Pellizzari (ITA)	VF Group–Bardiani–CSF–Faizanè	+ 11"
6	Pello Bilbao (ESP)	Team Bahrain Victorious	+ 11"
7	Domenico Pozzovivo (ITA)	VF Group–Bardiani–CSF–Faizanè	+ 11"
8	Steff Cras (BEL)	Team TotalEnergies	+ 11"
9	Luca Covili (ITA)	VF Group–Bardiani–CSF–Faizanè	+ 11"
10	Paul Double (GBR)	Polti–Kometa	+ 11"

General classification after Stage 3
Rank	Rider	Team	Time
1	Giovanni Aleotti (ITA)	Bora–Hansgrohe	12h 47' 17"
2	Jhonatan Narváez (ECU)	INEOS Grenadiers	+ 12"
3	Jordan Jegat (FRA)	Team TotalEnergies	+ 17"
4	Ben Healy (IRL)	EF Education–EasyPost	+ 19"
5	Filippo Zana (ITA)	Team Jayco–AlUla	+ 21"
6	Giulio Pellizzari (ITA)	VF Group–Bardiani–CSF–Faizanè	+ 21"
7	Luca Covili (ITA)	VF Group–Bardiani–CSF–Faizanè	+ 21"
8	Pello Bilbao (ESP)	Team Bahrain Victorious	+ 21"
9	Pablo Castrillo (ESP)	Equipo Kern Pharma	+ 21"
10	Domenico Pozzovivo (ITA)	VF Group–Bardiani–CSF–Faizanè	+ 21"

=== Stage 4 ===
15 June 2024 — Škofljica to Krvavec, 147.2 km (91.5 mi)

Stage 4 Result
Rank	Rider	Team	Time
1	Pello Bilbao (ESP)	Team Bahrain Victorious	3h 59' 09"
2	Paul Double (GBR)	Polti–Kometa	+ 3"
3	Giovanni Aleotti (ITA)	Bora–Hansgrohe	+ 3"
4	Giulio Pellizzari (ITA)	VF Group–Bardiani–CSF–Faizanè	+ 3"
5	Domenico Pozzovivo (ITA)	VF Group–Bardiani–CSF–Faizanè	+ 3"
6	Tobias Halland Johannessen (NOR)	Uno-X Mobility	+ 9"
7	Edoardo Zambanini (ITA)	Team Bahrain Victorious	+ 11"
8	Steff Cras (BEL)	Team TotalEnergies	+ 12"
9	Domen Novak (SLO)	UAE Team Emirates	+ 17"
10	Pablo Castrillo (ESP)	Equipo Kern Pharma	+ 20"

General classification after Stage 4
Rank	Rider	Team	Time
1	Giovanni Aleotti (ITA)	Bora–Hansgrohe	16h 46' 25"
2	Pello Bilbao (ESP)	Team Bahrain Victorious	+ 12"
3	Giulio Pellizzari (ITA)	VF Group–Bardiani–CSF–Faizanè	+ 25"
4	Domenico Pozzovivo (ITA)	VF Group–Bardiani–CSF–Faizanè	+ 25"
5	Steff Cras (BEL)	Team TotalEnergies	+ 34"
6	Pablo Castrillo (ESP)	Equipo Kern Pharma	+ 42"
7	Paul Double (GBR)	Polti–Kometa	+ 42"
8	Filippo Zana (ITA)	Team Jayco–AlUla	+ 45"
9	Ben Healy (IRL)	EF Education–EasyPost	+ 59"
10	Tobias Halland Johannessen (NOR)	Uno-X Mobility	+ 1' 43"

=== Stage 5 ===
16 June 2024 — Šentjernej to Novo Mesto, 156.9 km (97.5 mi)

Stage 5 Result
Rank	Rider	Team	Time
1	Ben Healy (IRL)	EF Education–EasyPost	3h 24' 06"
2	Alexander Kristoff (NOR)	Uno-X Mobility	+ 6"
3	Orluis Aular (VEN)	Caja Rural–Seguros RGA	+ 6"
4	Luka Mezgec (SLO)	Team Jayco–AlUla	+ 6"
5	Matej Mohorič (SLO)	Team Bahrain Victorious	+ 6"
6	Edoardo Zambanini (ITA)	Team Bahrain Victorious	+ 6"
7	Valerio Conti (ITA)	Team Corratec–Vini Fantini	+ 6"
8	Tobias Halland Johannessen (NOR)	Uno-X Mobility	+ 6"
9	Archie Ryan (IRL)	EF Education–EasyPost	+ 6"
10	Fernando Barceló (ESP)	Caja Rural–Seguros RGA	+ 6"

General classification after Stage 5
Rank	Rider	Team	Time
1	Giovanni Aleotti (ITA)	Bora–Hansgrohe	20h 10' 36"
2	Pello Bilbao (ESP)	Team Bahrain Victorious	+ 10"
3	Giulio Pellizzari (ITA)	VF Group–Bardiani–CSF–Faizanè	+ 26"
4	Domenico Pozzovivo (ITA)	VF Group–Bardiani–CSF–Faizanè	+ 26"
5	Pablo Castrillo (ESP)	Equipo Kern Pharma	+ 43"
6	Paul Double (GBR)	Polti–Kometa	+ 43"
7	Ben Healy (IRL)	EF Education–EasyPost	+ 44"
8	Filippo Zana (ITA)	Team Jayco–AlUla	+ 46"
9	Steff Cras (BEL)	Team TotalEnergies	+ 1' 28"
10	Tobias Halland Johannessen (NOR)	Uno-X Mobility	+ 1' 44"

== Classification leadership ==
Classification leadership by stage
Stage	Winner	General classification	Points classification	Mountains classification	Young rider classification	Team classification
1	Dylan Groenewegen	Dylan Groenewegen	Dylan Groenewegen	Tomáš Kalojíros	Jonathan Guatibonza	Team Jayco–AlUla
2	Phil Bauhaus	Phil Bauhaus	Phil Bauhaus	Davide Baldaccini	Alexander Hajek	Team Jayco–AlUla
3	Giovanni Aleotti	Giovanni Aleotti	Phil Bauhaus	Davide Baldaccini	Giulio Pellizzari	VF Group–Bardiani–CSF–Faizanè
4	Pello Bilbao	Giovanni Aleotti	Giovanni Aleotti	Davide Baldaccini	Giulio Pellizzari	VF Group–Bardiani–CSF–Faizanè
5	Ben Healy	Giovanni Aleotti	Giovanni Aleotti	Davide Baldaccini	Giulio Pellizzari	VF Group–Bardiani–CSF–Faizanè
Final		Giovanni Aleotti	Giovanni Aleotti	Davide Baldaccini	Giulio Pellizzari	VF Group–Bardiani–CSF–Faizanè

== Classification standings ==
Legend
Denotes the winner of the general classification	Denotes the winner of the points classification
Denotes the winner of the mountains classification	Denotes the winner of the young rider classification

=== General classification ===
Final general classification (1–10)
Rank	Rider	Team	Time
1	Giovanni Aleotti (ITA)	Bora–Hansgrohe	20h 10' 36"
2	Pello Bilbao (ESP)	Team Bahrain Victorious	+ 10"
3	Giulio Pellizzari (ITA)	VF Group–Bardiani–CSF–Faizanè	+ 26"
4	Domenico Pozzovivo (ITA)	VF Group–Bardiani–CSF–Faizanè	+ 26"
5	Pablo Castrillo (ESP)	Equipo Kern Pharma	+ 43"
6	Paul Double (GBR)	Polti–Kometa	+ 43"
7	Ben Healy (IRL)	EF Education–EasyPost	+ 44"
8	Filippo Zana (ITA)	Team Jayco–AlUla	+ 46"
9	Steff Cras (BEL)	Team TotalEnergies	+ 1' 28"
10	Tobias Halland Johannessen (NOR)	Uno-X Mobility	+ 1' 44"

=== Points classification ===
Final points classification (1–10)
Rank	Rider	Team	Points
1	Giovanni Aleotti (ITA)	Bora–Hansgrohe	47
2	Alexander Kristoff (NOR)	Uno-X Mobility	45
3	Pello Bilbao (ESP)	Team Bahrain Victorious	44
4	Phil Bauhaus (GER)	Team Bahrain Victorious	44
5	Jhonatan Narváez (ECU)	INEOS Grenadiers	37
6	Ben Healy (IRL)	EF Education–EasyPost	35
7	Luka Mezgec (SLO)	Team Jayco–AlUla	31
8	Alberto Dainese (ITA)	Tudor Pro Cycling Team	30
9	Paul Double (GBR)	Polti–Kometa	29
10	Giulio Pellizzari (ITA)	VF Group–Bardiani–CSF–Faizanè	26

=== Mountains classification ===
Final mountains classification (1–10)
Rank	Rider	Team	Points
1	Davide Baldaccini (ITA)	Team Corratec–Vini Fantini	14
2	Pello Bilbao (ESP)	Team Bahrain Victorious	10
3	Paul Double (GBR)	Polti–Kometa	10
4	Giovanni Aleotti (ITA)	Bora–Hansgrohe	6
5	Domenico Pozzovivo (ITA)	VF Group–Bardiani–CSF–Faizanè	5
6	Ben Healy (IRL)	EF Education–EasyPost	5
7	Tomáš Kalojíros (CZE)	Pierre Baguette Cycling	5
8	Martin Marcellusi (ITA)	VF Group–Bardiani–CSF–Faizanè	5
9	Mihael Štajnar (SLO)	Ljubljana Gusto Santic	4
10	Giulio Pellizzari (ITA)	VF Group–Bardiani–CSF–Faizanè	4

=== Young rider classification ===
Final young rider classification (1–10)
Rank	Rider	Team	Time
1	Giulio Pellizzari (ITA)	VF Group–Bardiani–CSF–Faizanè	20h 11' 02"
2	Brieuc Rolland (FRA)	Groupama–FDJ	+ 4' 15"
3	Fabio Christen (SUI)	UAE Team Emirates	+ 10' 34"
4	Alexander Hajek (AUT)	Bora–Hansgrohe	+ 14' 14"
5	Daniel Vysočan (CZE)	Pierre Baguette Cycling	+ 16' 45"
6	Maxime Decomble (FRA)	Groupama–FDJ	+ 19' 15"
7	Andrew August (USA)	INEOS Grenadiers	+ 20' 26"
8	António Morgado (POR)	UAE Team Emirates	+ 22' 16"
9	Jaka Marolt (SLO)	Sava Kranj Cycling	+ 22' 30"
10	Emil Herzog (GER)	Bora–Hansgrohe	+ 29' 11"

=== Team classification ===
Final team classification (1–10)
Rank	Team	Time
1	(Italy) VF Group–Bardiani–CSF–Faizanè	60h 34' 44"
2	(Spain) Euskaltel–Euskadi	+ 11' 10"
3	(Australia) Team Jayco–AlUla	+ 12' 58"
4	Team Bahrain Victorious	+ 14' 20"
5	(France) Team TotalEnergies	+ 18' 31"
6	(Italy) Polti–Kometa	+ 18' 59"
7	(Norway) Uno-X Mobility	+ 21' 33"
8	(Spain) Caja Rural–Seguros RGA	+ 21' 41"
9	(Belgium) Bingoal WB	+ 28' 14"
10	(United States) EF Education–EasyPost	+ 29' 45"
