= Davide Baldaccini =

Italian cyclist (born 1998)

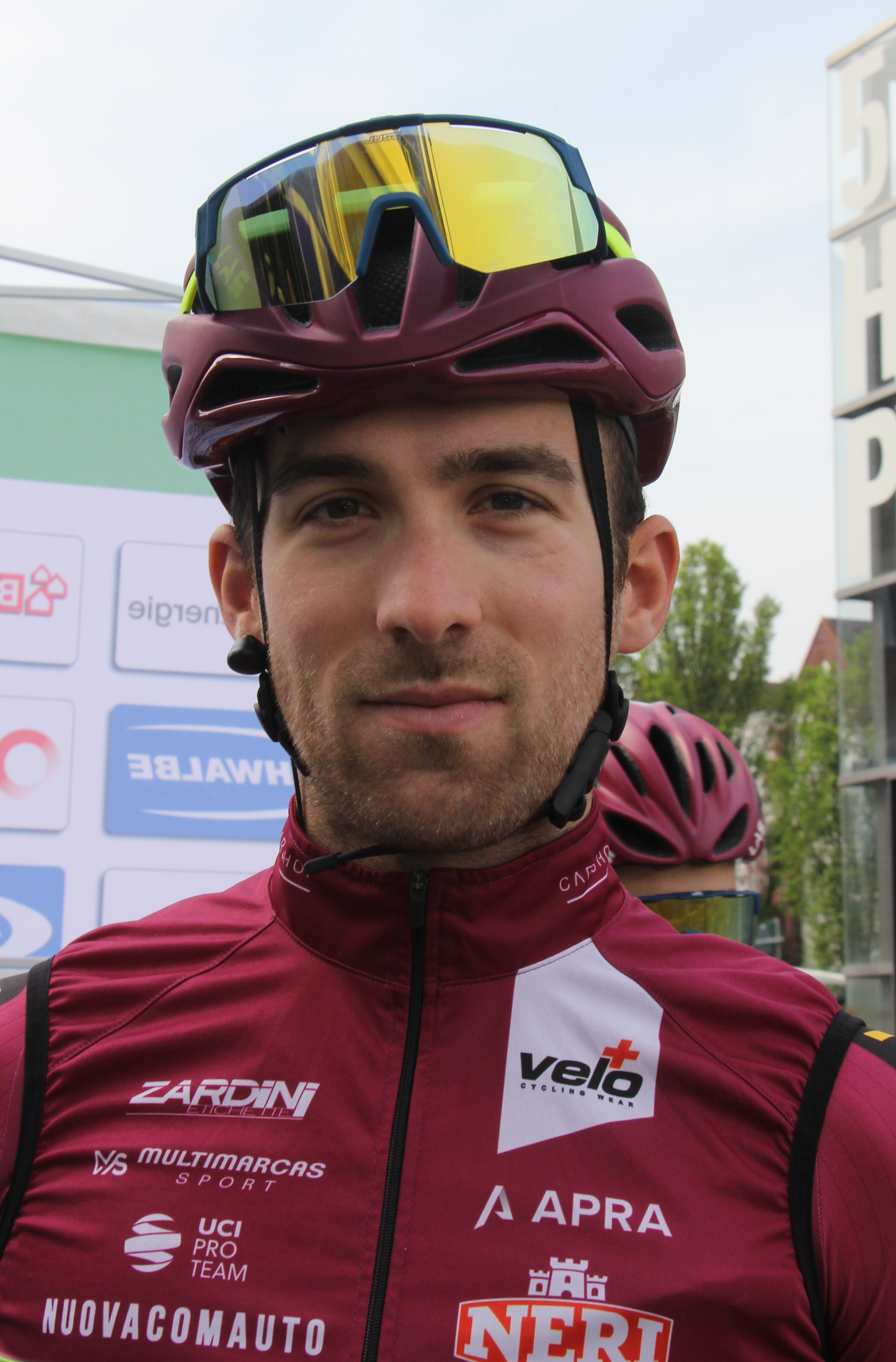
- Baldaccini in 2023

Personal information
- Born: 22 May 1998 (age 28) San Giovanni Bianco, Italy
- Height: 1.76 m (5 ft 9 in)

Cycling career
- Sport: Cycling
- Current team: Solution Tech NIPPO Rali
- Discipline: Road
- Role: Rider

Amateur teams
- 2011–2014: US Paladina Ivan Gotti
- 2015–2016: Team LVF
- 2017–2018: Team Colpack

Professional teams
- 2019–2020: Team Colpack
- 2022–: Team Corratec

Davide Baldaccini (born 22 May 1998) is an Italian racing cyclist, who currently rides for UCI ProTeam Solution Tech NIPPO Rali.

== Major results ==
2016
8th Trofeo Emilio Paganessi
9th Overall GP Général Patton
2019
8th Gran Premio Sportivi di Poggiana
2020
6th Trofeo Città di San Vendemiano
2023 (1 pro win)
3rd Overall Tour of Qinghai Lake

1st Stage 3

2024
1st Mountains classification, Tour of Slovenia
