= 2018 Vuelta a Murcia =

Race details
- Dates: 10 February 2018
- Stages: 1
- Distance: 208.3 km (129.4 mi)
- Winning time: 5h 06' 34"

Results
	Winner	Luis León Sánchez (ESP)	(Astana)
	Second	Alejandro Valverde (ESP)	(Movistar Team)
	Third	Philippe Gilbert (BEL)	(Quick-Step Floors)

The 2018 Vuelta a Murcia was the 38th edition of the Vuelta a Murcia cycle race and was held on 10 February 2018. The race started in Beniel and finished in Murcia. The race was won by Luis León Sánchez of the Astana Pro Team.

== General classification ==
Final general classification

Rank	Rider	Team	Time
1	Luis León Sánchez (ESP)	Astana	5h 06' 34"
2	Alejandro Valverde (ESP)	Movistar Team	+ 15"
3	Philippe Gilbert (BEL)	Quick-Step Floors	+ 2' 15"
4	Matteo Trentin (ITA)	Mitchelton–BikeExchange	+ 3' 54"
5	Pieter Serry (BEL)	Quick-Step Floors	+ 3' 54"
6	Jakob Fuglsang (DEN)	Astana	+ 3' 54"
7	Bob Jungels (LUX)	Quick-Step Floors	+ 3' 57"
8	Willie Smit (RSA)	Team Katusha–Alpecin	+ 5' 11"
9	José Joaquín Rojas (ESP)	Movistar Team	+ 5' 16"
10	Pieter Vanspeybrouck (BEL)	Wanty–Groupe Gobert	+ 5' 16"
