= Roniel Campos =

Venezuelan cyclist

Personal information
- Full name: Roniel Campos Lucena
- Born: 27 July 1993 (age 33) Nirgua, Venezuela

Cycling career
- Sport: Cycling
- Current team: Li-Ning Star
- Discipline: Road
- Role: Rider

Amateur teams
- 2014–2016: Gobernación de Yaracuy
- 2017–2018: Amo Táchira-Concafé
- 2018–2019: Pédale Pilotine
- 2019: Loteria del Táchira
- 2019–2020: Deportivo Tachira–JHS
- 2020–2021: Team Atlético Venezuela

Professional teams
- 2017: China Continental Team of Gansu Bank
- 2021: Louletano–Loulé Concelho
- 2023–: Li-Ning Star

Roniel Campos Lucena (born 27 July 1993) is a Venezuelan professional racing cyclist, who currently rides for UCI Continental team Li-Ning Star.

== Major results ==
2011
1st Time trial, National Junior Road Championships
2014
1st Young rider classification Volta do Paraná
2nd Time trial, National Under-23 Road Championships
7th Time trial, National Road Championships
2016
National Road Championships

3rd Road race
6th Time trial

7th Overall Vuelta al Tachira
2017
5th Overall Vuelta al Tachira

1st Stage 7

7th Time trial, National Road Championships
2019
8th Overall Vuelta al Tachira

1st Mountains classification

2020
1st Overall Vuelta al Tachira
2021
1st Overall Vuelta al Tachira

1st Points classification
1st Stages 2, 3 & 5

2022
1st Overall Vuelta al Tachira

1st Mountains classification
1st Stage 6
