= Josh Kench =

New Zealand cyclist (born 1996)

Personal information
- Full name: Joshua Kench
- Born: 6 May 2001 (age 25)

Cycling career
- Sport: Cycling
- Current team: Li-Ning Star
- Discipline: Road
- Role: Rider

Amateur team
- 2017–2018: Skoda Racing

Professional teams
- 2020–2023: Black Spoke Pro Cycling Academy
- 2024: Tianyoude Hotel Cycling Team
- 2025: Li-Ning Star
- 2026–: Groupama–FDJ United

Joshua Kench (born 6 May 2001) is a New Zealand professional racing cyclist, who rides for UCI WorldTeam Groupama–FDJ United.

== Major results ==
2018
3rd Road race, National Junior Road Championships
2019
1st Stage 4 Tour de l'Abitibi
2022
1st Stage 1 (TTT) New Zealand Cycle Classic
2nd Lillehammer GP
3rd Overall Tour of Southland
2023
9th Overall Tour of Qinghai Lake
2025
1st Overall Tour of Sharjah

1st Stage 4

1st Overall Tour of Bostonliq
