= Willie Smit =

South African bicycle racer (born 1992)

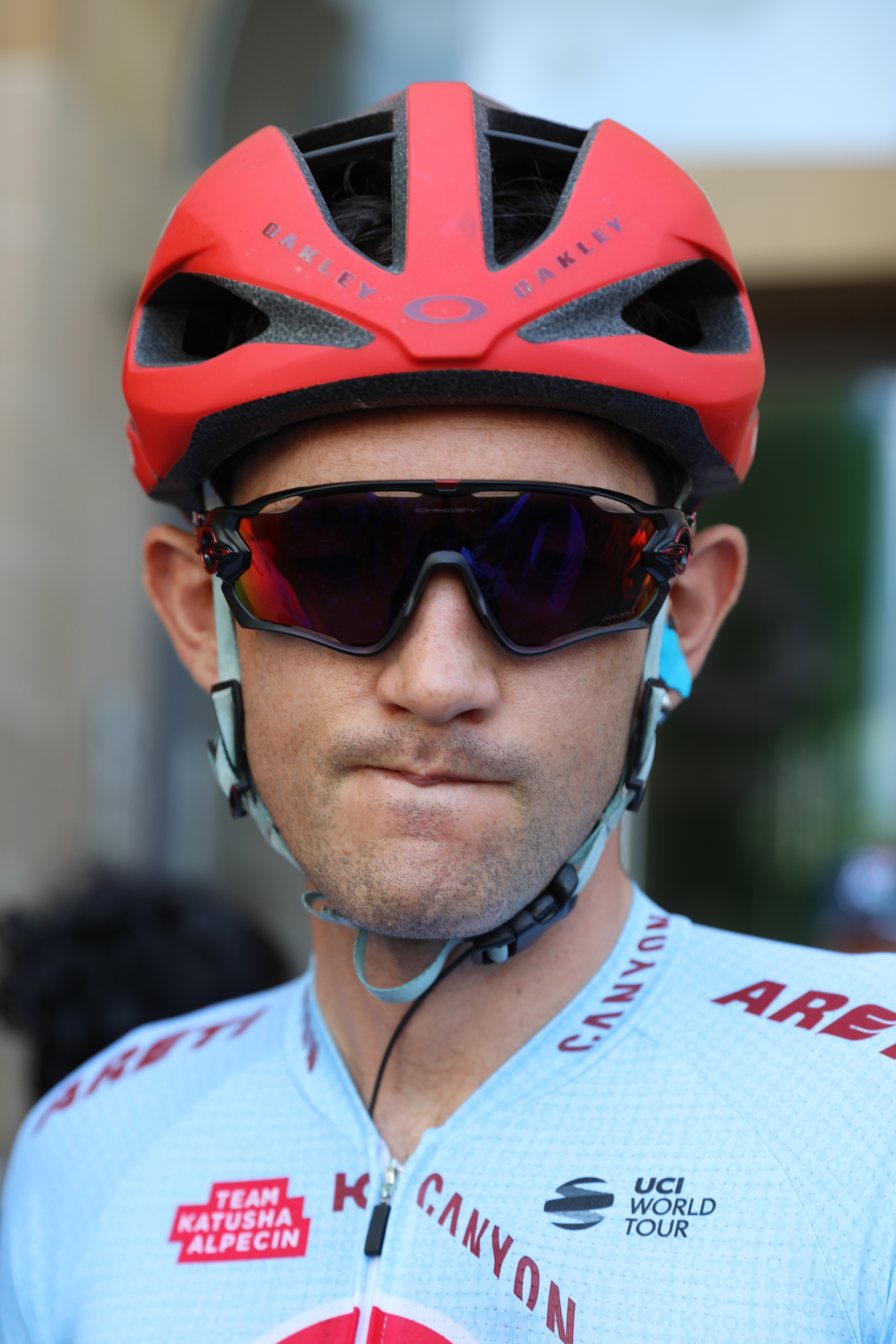
- Smit in 2019

Personal information
- Full name: Willem Jakobus Smit
- Nicknames: Willie; Smurfy
- Born: 29 December 1992 (age 33) Lydenburg, South Africa
- Height: 1.8 m (5 ft 11 in)
- Weight: 72 kg (159 lb)

Cycling career
- Sport: Cycling
- Current team: China Anta–Mentech Cycling Team
- Discipline: Road
- Role: Rider
- Rider type: Rouleur

Amateur teams
- 2012–2013: Cyclelab–M Power Fm
- 2015: Team Europcar SA
- 2016: Team UC Nantes Atlantique
- 2017: Rías Baixas
- 2017: RoadCover

Professional teams
- 2014: Vini Fantini–Nippo
- 2018–2019: Team Katusha–Alpecin
- 2020–2021: Burgos BH
- 2022–: China Glory Continental Cycling Team

Willem Jakobus Smit (born 29 December 1992) is a South African cyclist, who currently rides for UCI Continental team China Anta–Mentech Cycling Team. In August 2019, he was named in the startlist for the 2019 Vuelta a España.

== Major results ==
2013
1st Time trial, African Under–23 Road Championships
2nd Time trial, African Road Championships
2015
5th Time trial, African Road Championships
2017
African Road Championships

1st Road race
4th Time trial

1st Overall Tour Meles Zenawi

1st Points classification
1st Stage 5

1st Overall Vuelta Ciclista a León
National Road Championships

3rd Road race
3rd Time trial

2018
8th Vuelta a Murcia
2020
Combativity award Stage 3 Vuelta a España
2021
National Road Championships

2nd Road race
4th Time trial

10th Trofeo Calvia
2022
National Road Championships

2nd Road race
4th Time trial

2023
1st Alanya Cup
5th Overall Tour of Qinghai Lake
2024
1st Stage 1 Tour of Sakarya
2025
1st Sprints classification, Tour of Turkey

=== Grand Tour general classification results timeline ===
Grand Tour	2019	2020
Giro d'Italia	—	—
Tour de France	—	—
Vuelta a España	118	73

Legend
—	Did not compete
DNF	Did not finish
