= Matteo Malucelli (cyclist) =

Italian bicycle racer

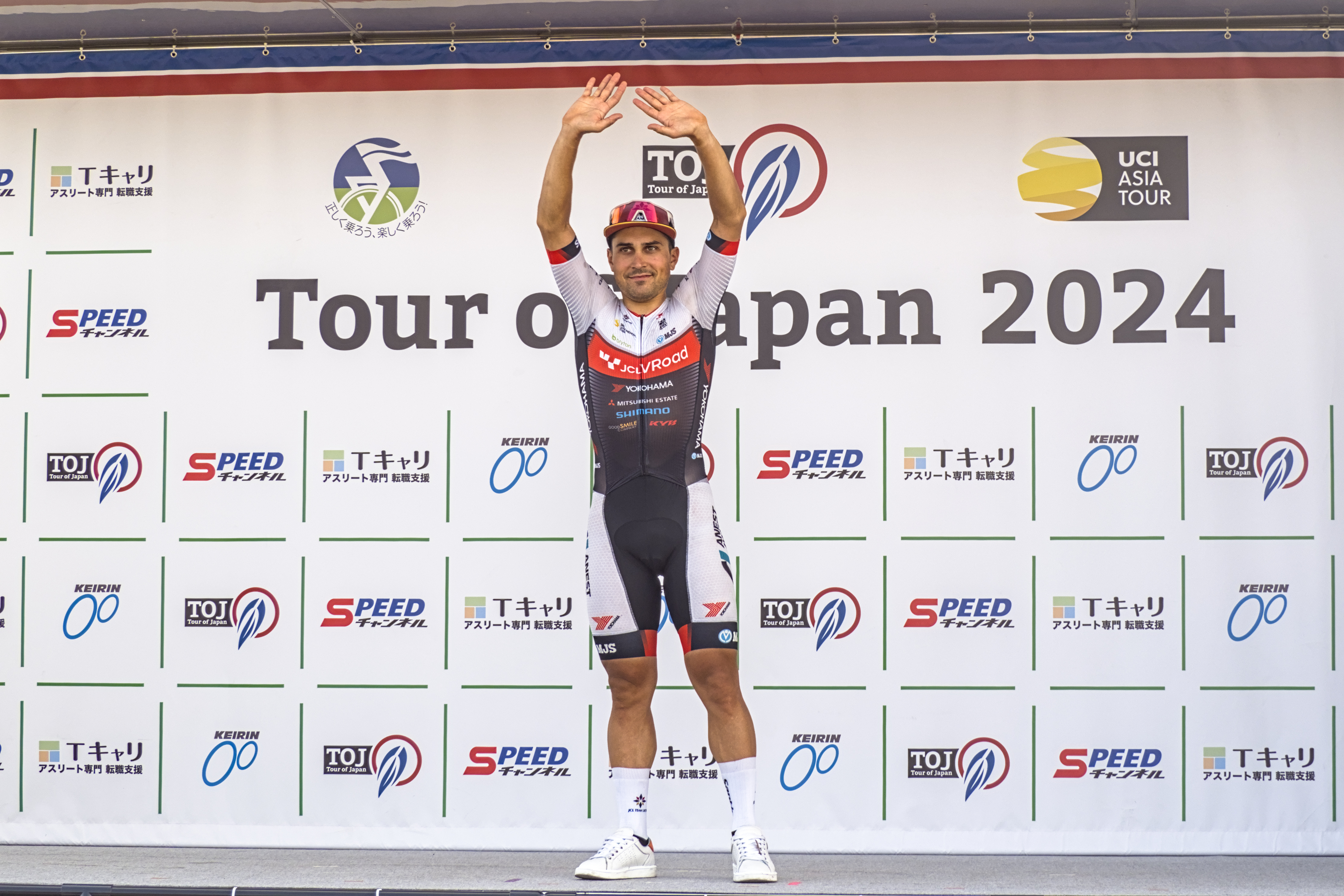
- Malucelli in 2024

Personal information
- Full name: Matteo Malucelli
- Born: 20 October 1993 (age 32) Forlì, Italy
- Height: 1.71 m (5 ft 7 in)
- Weight: 68 kg (150 lb)

Cycling career
- Sport: Cycling
- Current team: XDS Astana Team
- Discipline: Road
- Role: Rider
- Rider type: Sprinter

Amateur teams
- 2008–2009: U.C. Scat
- 2010–2011: U.P. Calderara
- 2012–2014: U.S. Fausto Coppi Gazzera

Professional teams
- 2015: Team Idea 2010 ASD
- 2016: Unieuro–Wilier
- 2017–2018: Androni Giocattoli–Sidermec
- 2019–2020: Caja Rural–Seguros RGA
- 2021: Androni Giocattoli–Sidermec
- 2022: Gazprom–RusVelo
- 2022: China Glory Continental Cycling Team
- 2023: Bingoal WB
- 2024: JCL Team UKYO
- 2025–: XDS Astana Team

Major wins
- Stage races Tour of Taihu Lake (2025)

Matteo Malucelli (born 20 October 1993) is an Italian cyclist, who currently rides for UCI WorldTeam XDS Astana Team.

== Major results ==
2015 (1 pro win)
1st Stage 3 Rás Tailteann
1st Stage 10 Volta a Portugal
3rd Circuito del Porto
6th Trofej Umag
2016
Tour du Maroc

1st Points classification
1st Stages 3, 4 & 6

1st Stage 1 Okolo Slovenska
8th GP Kranj
2017 (1)
1st Stage 2 Okolo Slovenska
Tour of Bihor

1st Points classification
1st Stages 1 & 3

2018 (1)
Vuelta al Táchira

1st Stages 1 & 3

1st Stage 2 Vuelta a Aragón
1st Stage 1 Tour of China I
1st Stage 2 Tour de Bretagne
1st Stage 1 Tour of Bihor
1st Stage 1 Vuelta a Venezuela
2019
1st Points classification, Tour Poitou-Charentes en Nouvelle-Aquitaine
2021
1st Stage 1 Vuelta al Táchira
10th Cholet-Pays de la Loire
2022 (1)
1st Stage 1 Tour of Antalya
1st Stage 1 Giro di Sicilia
2023
7th Grote Prijs Jean-Pierre Monseré
9th Paris–Chauny
9th Heistse Pijl
10th Omloop van het Houtland
2024 (3)
1st Overall Tour of Bulgaria

1st Stages 1, 3 & 5

Tour de Langkawi

1st Points classification
1st Stages 2, 7 & 8

Tour of Japan

1st Stages 2 & 8

1st Stage 1 Giro della Regione Friuli Venezia Giulia
1st Points classification, Tour de Taiwan
2025 (8)
1st Overall Tour of Taihu Lake

1st Points classification
1st Stages 1 & 4

Tour de Langkawi

1st Stages 1, 3 & 4

1st Stage 8 Tour of Turkey
1st Stage 1 Tour of Hainan
4th Trofeo Palma
4th Kampioenschap van Vlaanderen
9th Trofeo Ses Salines
2026 (4)
Tour de Langkawi

1st Points classification
1st Stages 1, 3 & 8

1st Stage 4 AlUla Tour

=== Grand Tour general classification results timeline ===
Grand Tour	2026
Giro d'Italia	151
Tour de France	—
Vuelta a España	

Legend
—	Did not compete
DNF	Did not finish
