= Attilio Viviani =

Italian cyclist

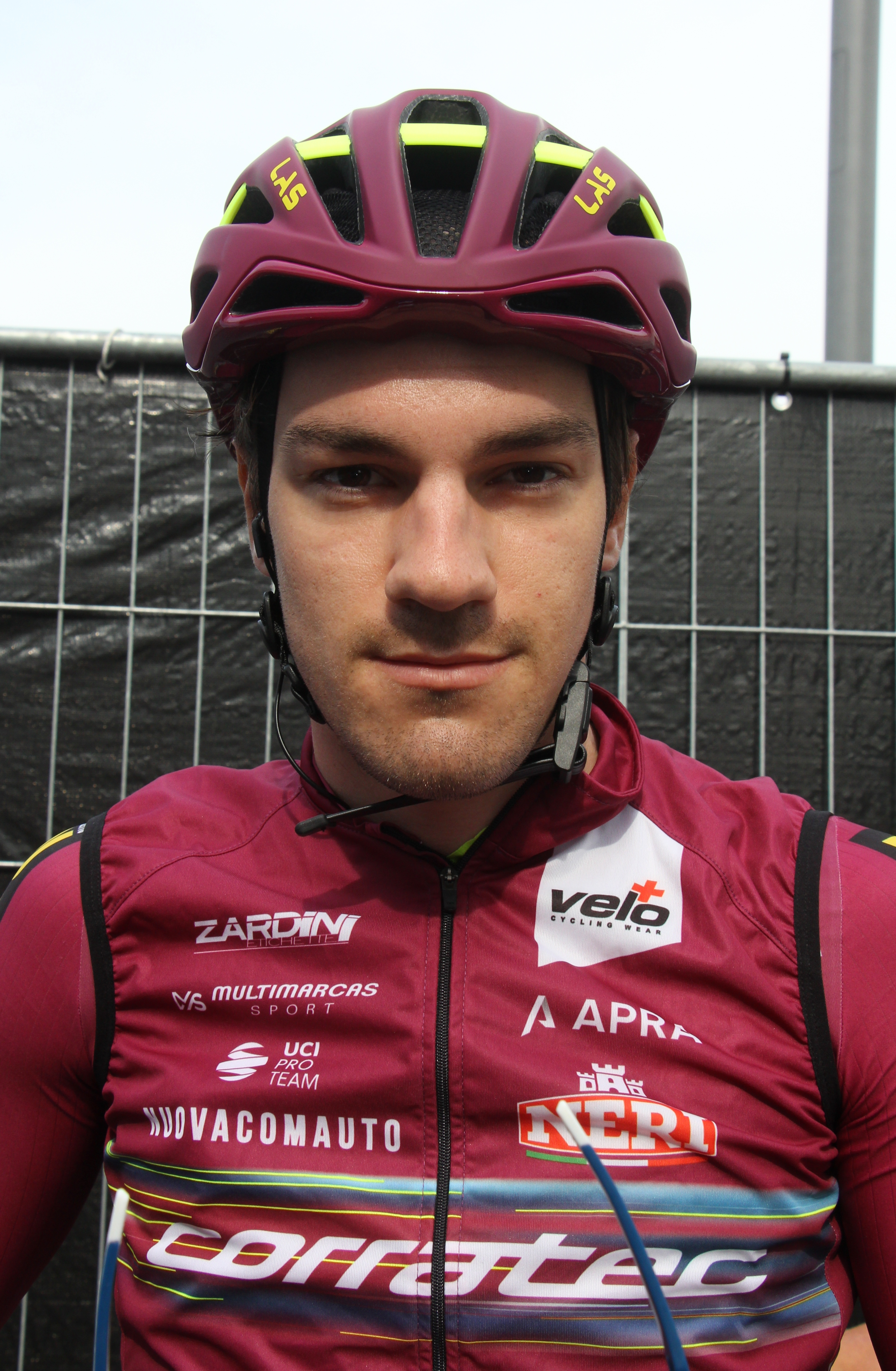
- Viviani (2023)

Personal information
- Full name: Attilio Viviani
- Born: 18 October 1996 (age 29) Oppeano, Italy
- Height: 1.74 m (5 ft 9 in)
- Weight: 69 kg (152 lb)

Cycling career
- Sport: Cycling
- Current team: Solution Tech NIPPO Rali
- Discipline: Road
- Role: Rider
- Rider type: Sprinter

Amateur teams
- 2014: Cipollini–Assali Stefen–Alé
- 2015–2017: Team Colpack
- 2019: Arvedi Cycling ASD

Professional teams
- 2018: Sangemini–MG.K Vis Vega
- 2019: Cofidis (stagiaire)
- 2020–2021: Cofidis
- 2022: Bingoal Pauwels Sauces WB
- 2023–: Team Corratec

Attilio Viviani (born 18 October 1996 in Oppeano) is an Italian cyclist, who currently rides for UCI ProTeam Solution Tech NIPPO Rali. He is the younger brother of retired professional cyclist Elia Viviani.

== Major results ==
=== Road ===
2013
6th GP dell'Arno
2019
1st Schaal Sels
2020
1st Stage 1 La Tropicale Amissa Bongo
2023
1st Stage 6 Tour of Qinghai Lake
2nd Trofeo Città di Castelfidardo

==== Grand Tour general classification results timeline ====
Grand Tour	2021
Giro d'Italia	142
Tour de France	—
Vuelta a España	—

Legend
—	Did not compete
DNF	Did not finish

=== Track ===
2014
1st Scratch, UEC European Junior Championships
