= Enrico Zanoncello =

Italian cyclist

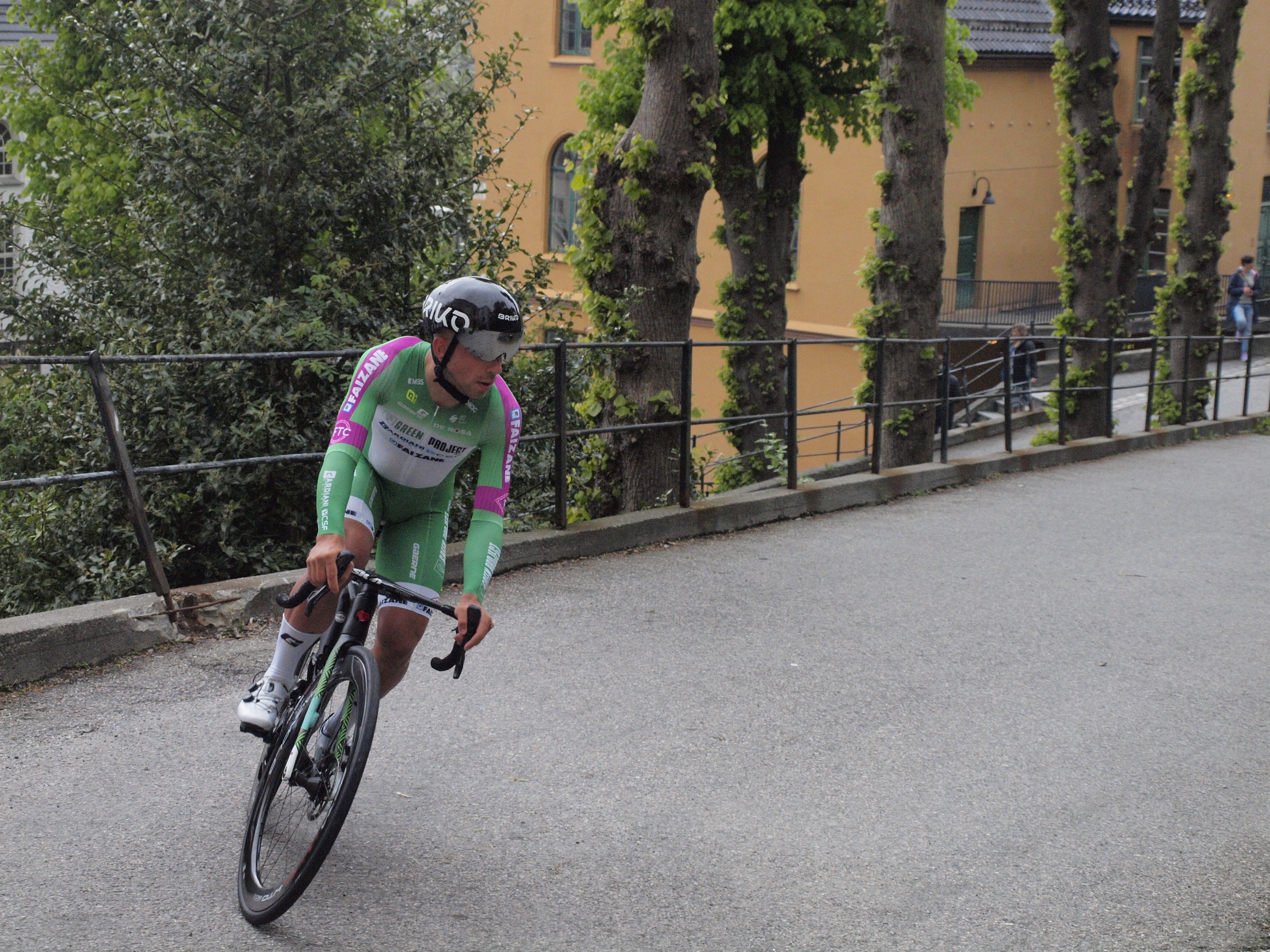
- Zanoncello at the 2023 Tour of Norway

Personal information
- Born: 2 August 1997 (age 29) Isola della Scala, Italy
- Height: 1.70 m (5 ft 7 in)
- Weight: 64 kg (141 lb)

Cycling career
- Sport: Cycling
- Current team: Bardiani–CSF 7 Saber
- Discipline: Road
- Role: Rider

Amateur teams
- 2010–2013: GS Luc Bovolone
- 2014: Cadidavid
- 2015: Cipollini Assali Stefan
- 2016–2018: Team Colpack
- 2019–2020: Zalf–Euromobil–Désirée–Fior

Professional teams
- 2020: Cofidis (stagiaire)
- 2021–: Bardiani–CSF–Faizanè

Enrico Zanoncello (born 2 August 1997) is an Italian racing cyclist, who currently rides for UCI ProTeam Bardiani–CSF 7 Saber.

== Major results ==
2014
9th Trofeo comune di Vertova
2018
9th GP Laguna
2019
7th Circuito del Porto
2020
1st Coppa San Geo
2022
2nd Grand Prix Megasaray
6th Umag Trophy
6th Ronde van de Achterhoek
2023 (3 pro wins)
Tour de Taiwan

1st Points classification
1st Stage 5

1st Stage 5 Tour of Qinghai Lake
2nd Overall Tour of Taihu Lake

1st Stage 1

4th Overall Belgrade Banjaluka

1st Stage 2

2024 (1)
1st Stage 1 Giro d'Abruzzo
7th La Roue Tourangelle
2026
6th Trofeo Palma
2026
7th Clásica de Almería

=== Grand Tour general classification results timeline ===
Grand Tour	2024	2025	2026
Giro d'Italia	124	151	DSQ
Tour de France	—	—	—
Vuelta a España	—	—	—

Legend
—	Did not compete
DNF	Did not finish
DSQ	Disqualified
