= Martijn Rasenberg =

Dutch cyclist

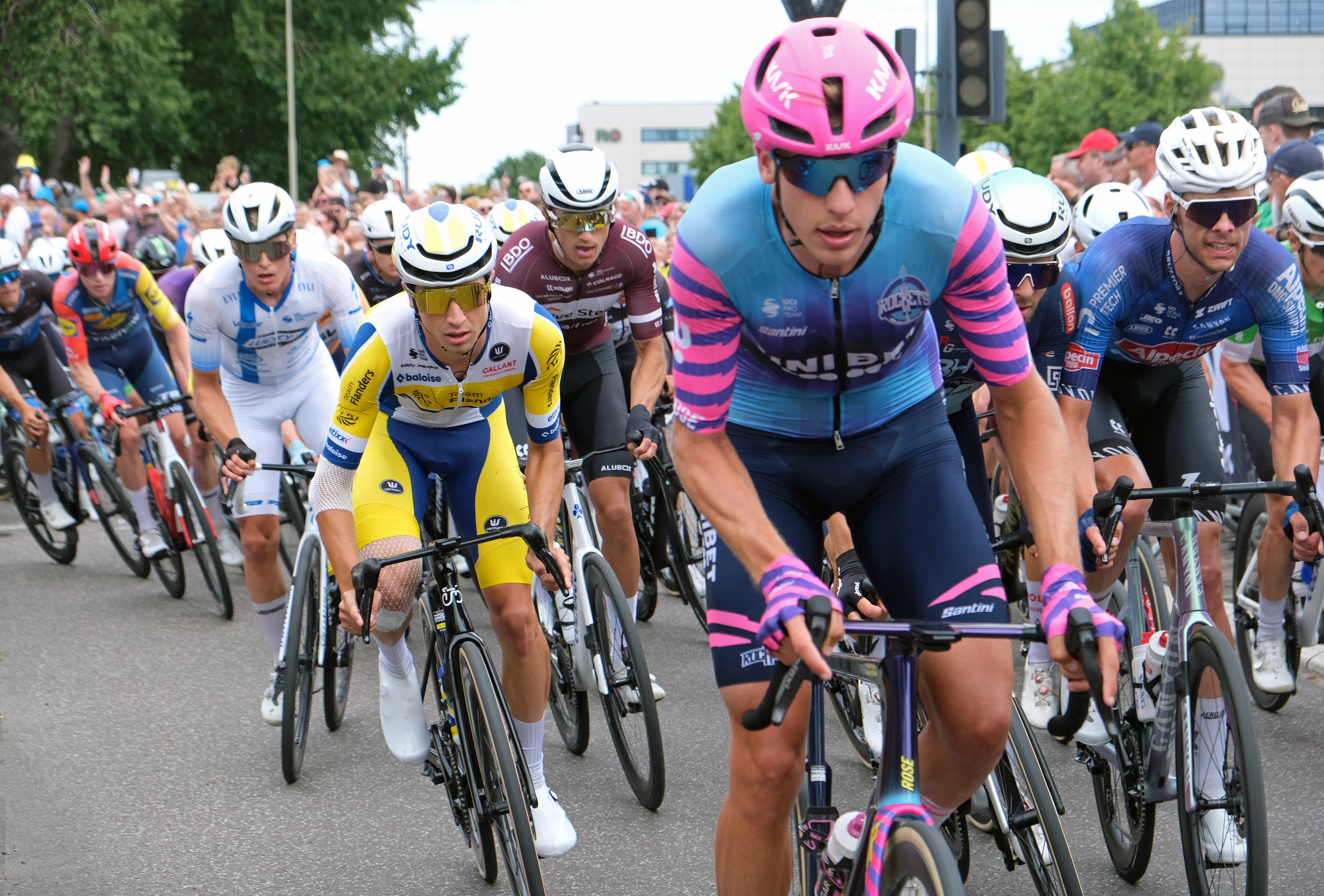

Personal information
- Born: 9 November 2001 (age 24) Breda, Netherlands
- Height: 1.94 m (6 ft 4 in)
- Weight: 78 kg (172 lb)

Cycling career
- Sport: Cycling
- Current team: Unibet Rose Rockets
- Discipline: Road
- Role: Rider

Amateur teams
- 2019: Ridley–Hermans DT
- 2020: Team Reggeborgh
- 2021: Van Uitert–De Jonge Renner
- 2022: Jegg–DJR Academy

Professional teams
- 2023–2025: ABLOC CT
- 2025: Unibet Tietema Rockets (stagiaire)
- 2026–: Unibet Rose Rockets

Martijn Rasenberg (born 9 November 2001) is a Dutch professional racing cyclist, who currently rides for UCI ProTeam Unibet Rose Rockets.

== Major results ==
2021
10th Overall Carpathian Couriers Race
2023
1st Ronde van de Achterhoek
1st Grote Ronde van Gerwen
2024
1st Omloop der Kempen
2025
1st Overall Flèche du Sud
1st Slag om Woensdrecht
9th Ronde van de Achterhoek
