= Alexander Salby =

Danish cyclist

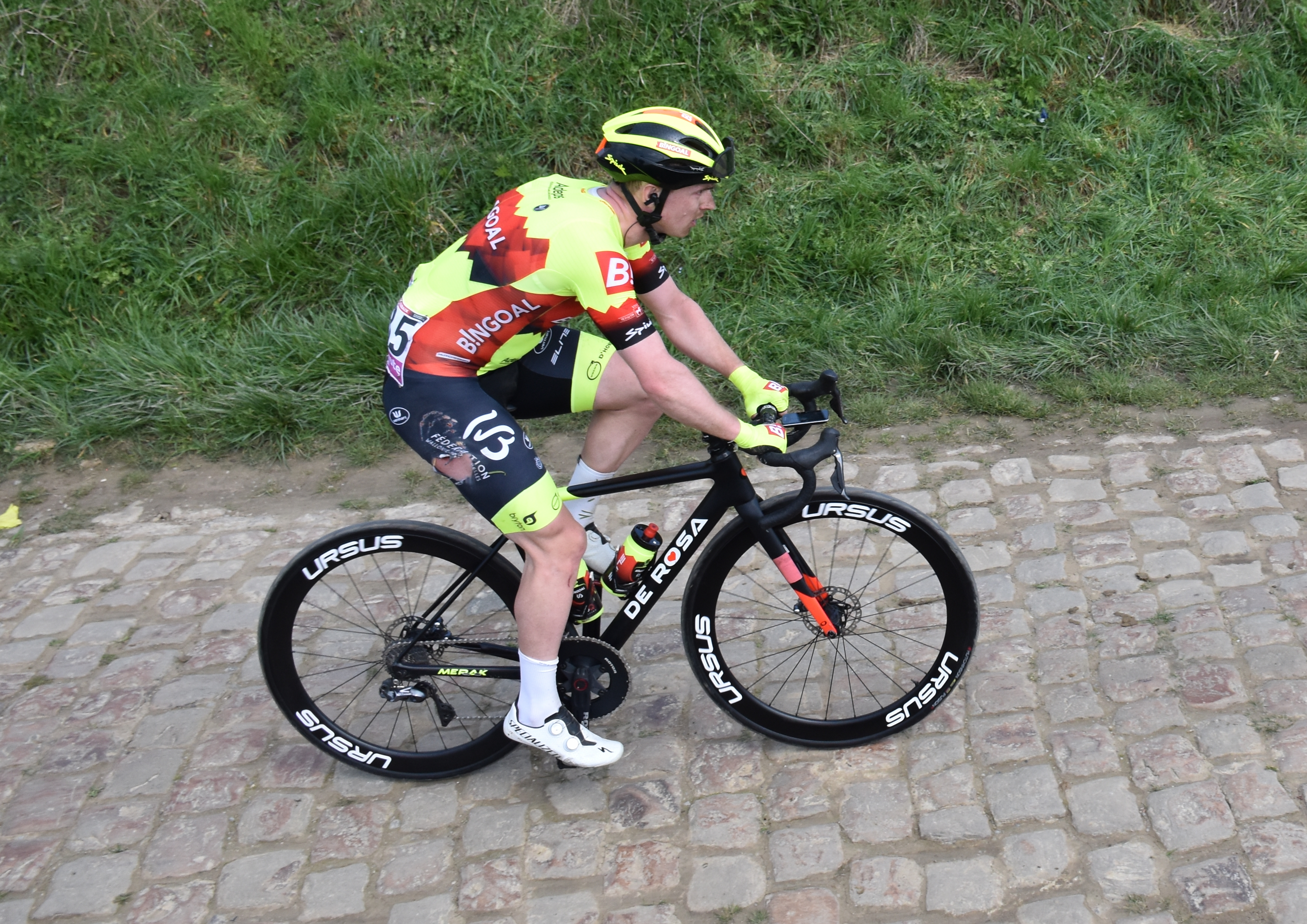
- Salby at the 2023 Paris–Roubaix

Personal information
- Born: 4 June 1998 (age 28) Aabenraa, Denmark
- Height: 1.76 m (5 ft 9 in)
- Weight: 68 kg (150 lb)

Cycling career
- Sport: Cycling
- Current team: Li-Ning Star
- Discipline: Road
- Role: Rider
- Rider type: Sprinter

Amateur teams
- 2013–2014: Rødekro Cykle Club
- 2015: Riwal Cycling–Climacell Junior
- 2016: Climacell Xtreme Odense

Professional teams
- 2017: Team Almeborg–Bornholm
- 2018–2021: Team ColoQuick
- 2022: Riwal Cycling Team
- 2023–2024: Bingoal WB
- 2025–: Li-Ning Star

Alexander Salby (born 4 June 1998) is a Danish cyclist, who currently rides for UCI Continental team Li-Ning Star.

== Major results ==
2018
6th Himmerland Rundt
2019
3rd Youngster Coast Challenge
2020
4th Road race, National Under-23 Road Championships
2021
1st Overall Post Cup
6th Fyen Rundt
2023 (1 pro win)
1st Stage 7 La Tropicale Amissa Bongo
3rd Fyen Rundt
9th Veenendaal–Veenendaal Classic
2024 (1)
1st Stage 5 ZLM Tour
2025 (9)
1st Overall Tour of Thailand

1st Points classification
1st Stages 2, 3 & 5

1st Stages 3 & 8 Tour of Magnificent Qinghai
1st Stage 2 Tour of Taihu Lake
1st Stage 5 Tour of Hainan
1st Stage 1 Tour of Huangshan
2nd Overall Yellow River Estuary Road Cycling Race

1st Stage 1

3rd Overall Tour of Shanghai

1st Stage 3

4th Tour of Binzhou
2026 (1)
1st Stage 5 Tour of Hainan
