= Dušan Rajović =

Serbian cyclist

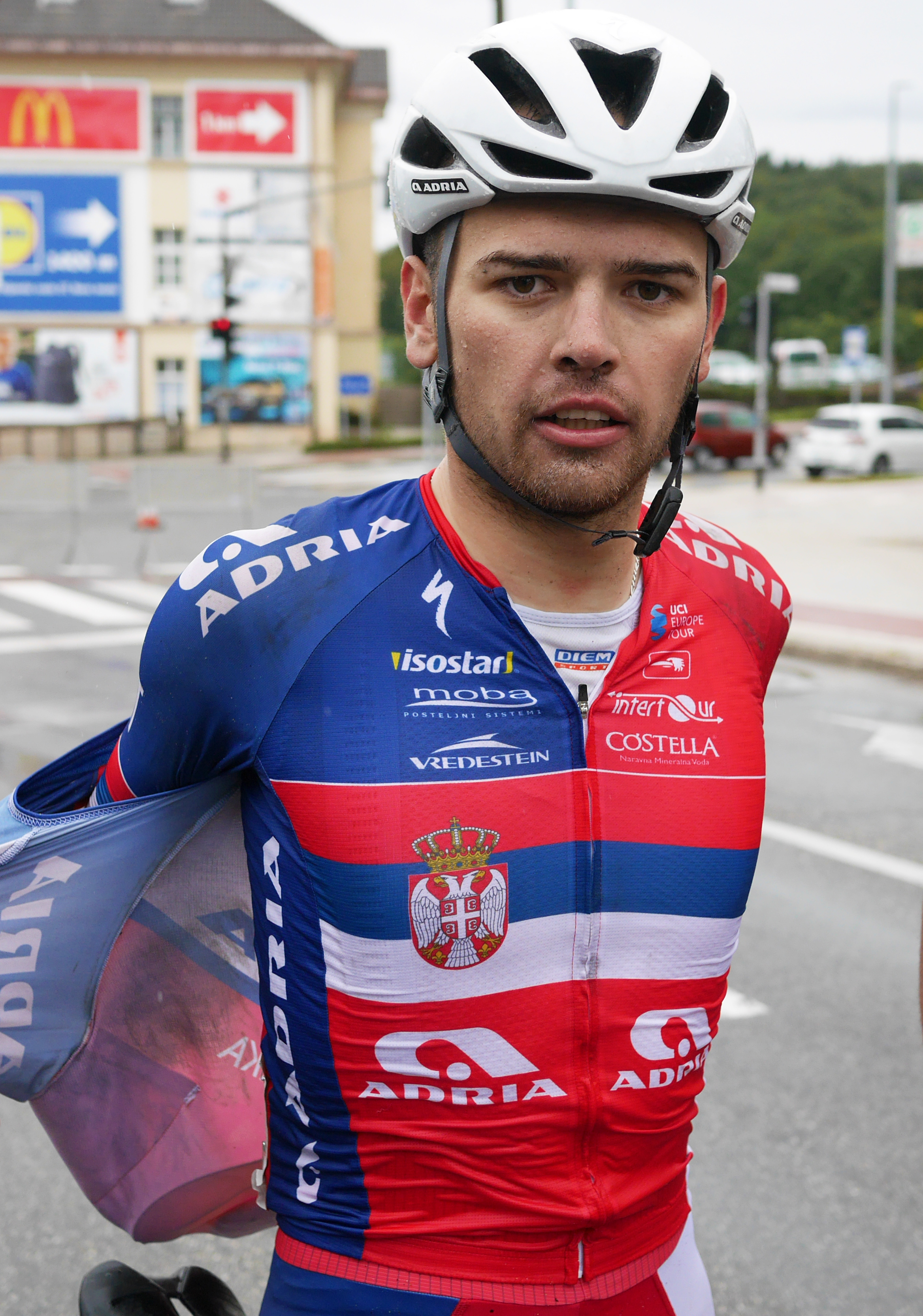
- Rajović after winning Croatia-Slovenia in 2018

Personal information
- Born: 19 November 1997 (age 28) Kraljevo, Serbia, FR Yugoslavia
- Height: 183 cm (6 ft 0 in)
- Weight: 76 kg (168 lb)

Cycling career
- Sport: Cycling
- Current team: Solution Tech NIPPO Rali
- Discipline: Road
- Role: Rider
- Rider type: Sprinter

Amateur teams
- 2011–2014: Metalac Kraljevo
- 2015–2016: World Cycling Centre

Professional teams
- 2017–2019: Adria Mobil
- 2020–2021: Nippo–Delko–One Provence
- 2022: Team Corratec
- 2023–2024: Team Bahrain Victorious
- 2025–: Team Solution Tech–Vini Fantini

Major wins
- One-day races and Classics National Time Trial Championships (2016, 2017, 2022, 2024, 2025, 2026) National Road Race Championships (2018, 2019, 2021, 2022, 2023)

Dušan Rajović (born 19 November 1997) is a Serbian cyclist, who currently rides for UCI ProTeam Solution Tech NIPPO Rali.

== Major results ==
2014
National Junior Road Championships

1st Road race
1st Time trial

1st Overall Memorial Dimitr Yankov

1st Stages 1 & 2

1st Overall Belgrade Trophy Milan Panić

1st Stages 1 & 2

2015
National Junior Road Championships

1st Road race
1st Time trial

1st Stage 4 Grand Prix Rüebliland
2016 (1 pro win)
1st Time trial, National Road Championships
5th Belgrade–Banja Luka II
7th Belgrade–Banja Luka I
2017 (2)
1st Time trial, National Road Championships
1st Croatia–Slovenia
1st Stage 2 Tour of Qinghai Lake
3rd Belgrade–Banja Luka I
3rd Belgrade–Banja Luka II
2018 (2)
1st Road race, National Road Championships
1st GP Izola
1st Croatia–Slovenia
1st Stage 10 Tour of Qinghai Lake
3rd Poreč Trophy
3rd Umag Trophy
10th GP Laguna
2019 (3)
1st Road race, National Road Championships
1st International Rhodes Grand Prix
1st Stage 4 CRO Race
1st Stage 1 Tour of Rhodes
1st Stage 2a (ITT) Tour of Bihor
2020
4th Overall Tour of Serbia

1st Stage 3

2021 (1)
1st Road race, National Road Championships
2022 (3)
National Road Championships

1st Road race
1st Time trial

1st Poreč Trophy
Vuelta Ciclista a Venezuela

1st Stages 2 & 7

1st Stage 2 Vuelta al Táchira
1st Stage 2 Tour of Antalya
3rd Umag Trophy
9th Grand Prix Justiniano Hotels
2023 (1)
1st Road race, National Road Championships
2024 (1)
1st Time trial, National Road Championships
8th Overall Tour of Huangshan

1st Stage 1

2025 (4)
1st Time trial, National Road Championships
1st Stage 2 Tour of Sharjah
1st Stage 2 Tour of Hainan
1st Belgrade–Banja Luka
1st Stage 1 Tour of Japan
5th Overall Trans-Himalaya Cycling Race

1st Points classification
1st Stages 3 & 4

2026 (5)
1st Time trial, National Road Championships
1st Umag Classic
Tour de Taiwan

1st Stages 1 & 4

1st Stage 1 Tour of Hainan
1st Stage 2 Tour of Slovenia
1st Stage 3 Giro di Sardegna
4th Scheldeprijs
