= Steffen De Schuyteneer =

Belgian cyclist

Stephane De Schuyteneer
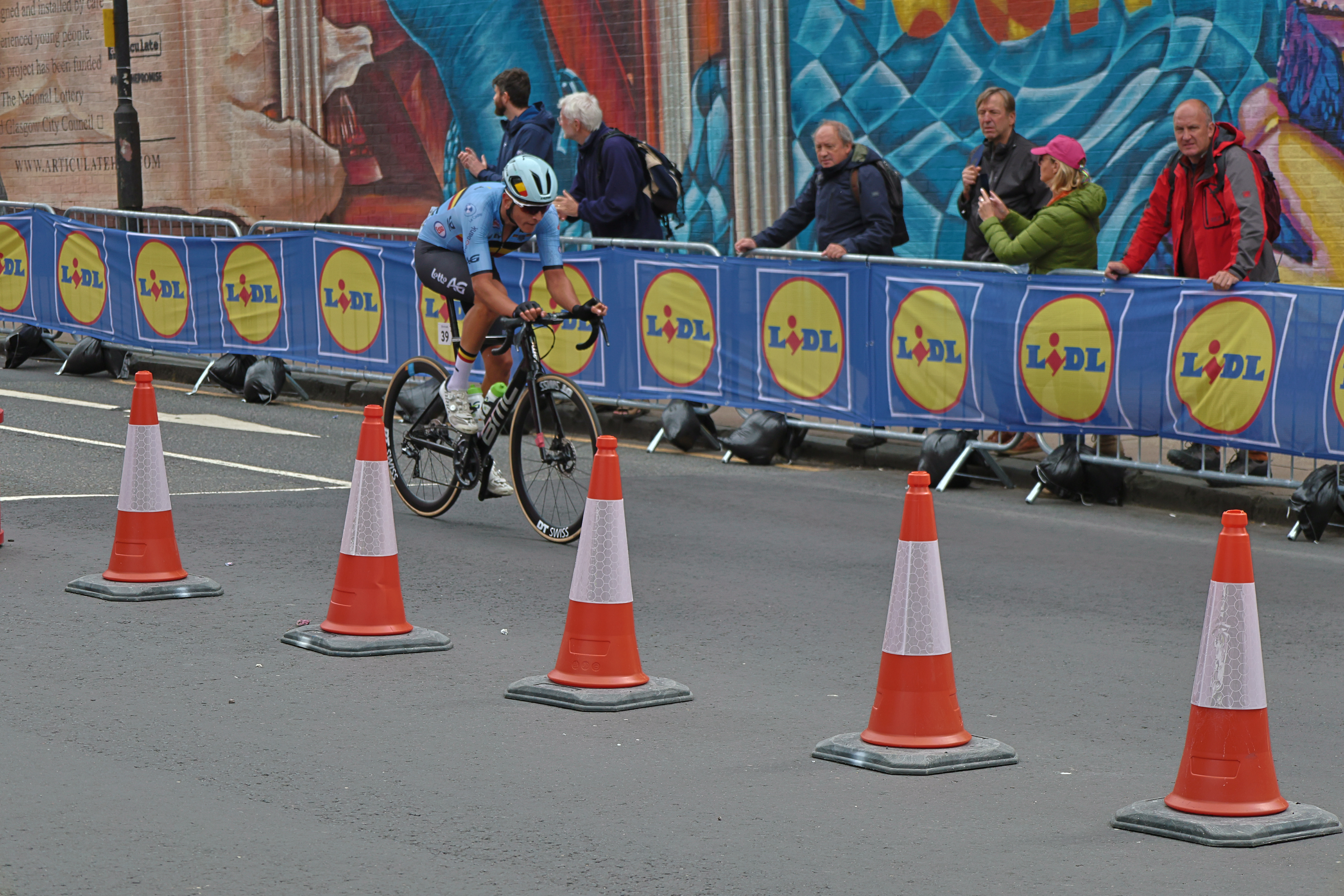
- De Schuyteneer at the 2023 UCI Road World Championships

Personal information
- Full name: Stephane De Schuyteneer
- Born: 24 February 2005 (age 21) Geraardsbergen, Belgium
- Height: 1.83 m (6 ft 0 in)
- Weight: 74 kg (163 lb)

Cycling career
- Sport: Cycling
- Current team: Lotto–Intermarché
- Discipline: Road
- Role: Rider

Amateur teams
- 2022: AVIA–Rudyco Cycling Team
- 2023: AG2R Citroën U19 Team

Professional teams
- 2024: Lotto–Dstny Development Team
- 2025–: Lotto

Steffen De Schuyteneer (born 24 February 2005) is a Belgian cyclist, who currently rides for UCI WorldTeam Lotto–Intermarché.

== Major results ==
2022
1st Stage 1 (TTT) Sint-Martinusprijs-Kontich
2nd Overall Keizer der Juniores

1st Stage 2a (ITT)

4th Overall Driedaagse van Axel

1st Young riders classification

4th Kuurne–Brussels–Kuurne Juniors
4th La Route des Géants
7th Gent–Wevelgem Juniors
2023
1st Overall Sint-Martinusprijs-Kontich

1st Stages 1 (TTT) & 3 (ITT)

1st Gent–Wevelgem Juniors
3rd Time trial, National Junior Road Championships
3rd Overall Guido Reybrouck Classic

1st Stage 2

3rd Kuurne–Brussels–Kuurne Juniors
5th Memorial Igor Decraene
7th Road race, UCI Junior Road World Championships
7th La Route des Géants
8th Paris–Roubaix Juniors
9th GP Ernest Beco
10th Overall Keizer der Juniores

1st Stages 2a (ITT) & 2b

2024 (1 pro win)
1st Stage 2 Tour of Taihu Lake
1st Stage 5 Giro Next Gen
2nd Overall Tour du Loir-et-Cher

1st Young riders classification

2nd Le Tour des 100 Communes
2nd Grand Prix de la Ville de Lillers
2nd Grand Prix de la Ville de Pérenchies
National Under-23 Road Championships

3rd Time trial
4th Road race

4th Brussel-Opwijk
6th Overall Olympia's Tour
7th Overall West Bohemia Tour

1st Points classification

9th Road race, UEC European Under-23 Road Championships
10th Youngster Coast Challenge
2025
1st Stage 3 Tour of Istanbul
3rd Overall Tour of Taihu Lake

1st Young riders classification

9th Volta NXT Classic
2026
2nd Grand Prix La Marseillaise
4th Bredene Koksijde Classic
7th Grand Prix Criquielion
7th Gooikse Pijl
9th Nokere Koerse
9th Scheldeprijs
9th Veenendaal–Veenendaal Classic
9th Heistse Pijl
10th Tour of Bruges
10th Le Samyn
