= Ronde van de Achterhoek =

Dutch cycling competition

Race details
- Date: August
- Region: Achterhoek, Netherlands
- Discipline: Road race
- Competition: UCI Europe Tour
- Type: Single day race
- Web site: www.rondevandeachterhoek.nl

History
- First edition: 2017
- Editions: 9 (as of 2026)
- First winner: Wim Kleiman (NED)
- Most wins: No repeat winners
- Most recent: Roan Konings (NED)

The Ronde van de Achterhoek is a one-day cycling race held annually in the Achterhoek region of the Netherlands. First held in 2017, it has been part of the UCI Europe Tour as a category 1.2 event since 2021.

== Winners ==
| Year | Winner | Second | Third |
|---|---|---|---|
| 2017 | (Netherlands) Wim Kleiman | (Netherlands) Maarten van Trijp | (Netherlands) Robin Wennekes |
| 2018 | (Netherlands) Cees Bol | (Netherlands) Rick van Breda | (Netherlands) Jason van Dalen |
| 2019 | (Netherlands) Marco Doets | (Netherlands) Coen Vermeltfoort | (Netherlands) Daan van Sintmaartensdijk |
| 2020 | Cancelled |
| 2021 | (Netherlands) Casper van Uden | (Netherlands) Jan-Willem van Schip | (New Zealand) Ryan Christensen |
| 2022 | (Netherlands) Coen Vermeltfoort | (Netherlands) Martijn Budding | (United Kingdom) Jim Brown |
| 2023 | (Netherlands) Martijn Rasenberg | (Netherlands) Martijn Budding | (United Kingdom) Noah Hobbs |
| 2024 | (Denmark) Stian Rosenlund | (France) Noa Isidore | (Netherlands) Daan van Sintmaartensdijk |
| 2025 | (Netherlands) Johan Dorussen | (Germany) Joshua Huppertz | (Netherlands) Yoeri Havik |
| 2026 | (Netherlands) Roan Konings | (Germany) Joshua Huppertz | (Netherlands) Guillaume Visser |
