= Solution Tech NIPPO Rali =

Cycling team

Team information
- UCI code: TFT
- Registered: Italy (2022–)
- Founded: 2022
- Discipline: Road
- Status: UCI Continental (2022); UCI ProTeam (2023–)
- Bicycles: Pardus

Key personnel
- General manager: Serge Parsani
- Team manager: Francesco Frassi

Team name history
- 2022 2023 2024 2025 2026–: Team Corratec; Team Corratec–Selle Italia; Team Corratec–Vini Fantini; Team Solution Tech–Vini Fantini; Solution Tech NIPPO Rali

Solution Tech NIPPO Rali (UCI team code: TFT) is a UCI ProTeam status road bicycle racing team based in Italy.

The team was founded in 2022, holding UCI Continental status. In December 2022, the Union Cycliste Internationale announced that Team Corratec was granted a UCI ProTeam licence for 2023 season.

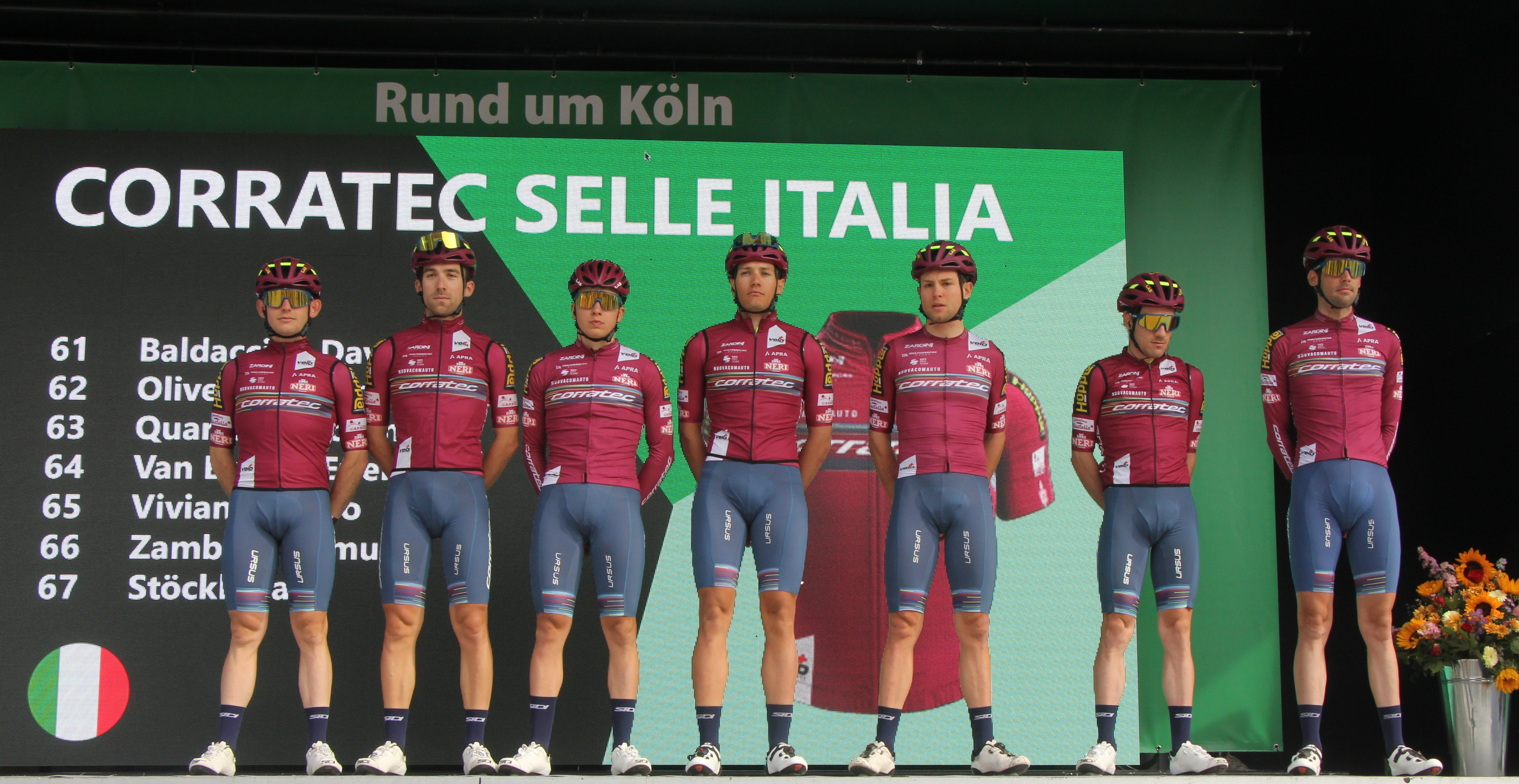
The team at the 2023 Rund um Köln

== Team roster ==
As of 25 January 2025.

Rider	Date of birth
Yukiya Arashiro (JPN)	22 September 1984 (age 41)
Davide Baldaccini (ITA)	22 May 1998 (age 28)
Alexandre Balmer (SUI)	4 May 2000 (age 26)
Valerio Conti (ITA)	30 March 1993 (age 33)
Đorđe Đurić (SRB)	21 June 2000 (age 26)
Filippo Fortin (ITA)	1 February 1989 (age 37)
Roberto González (PAN)	21 May 1994 (age 32)
Alessandro Iacchi (ITA)	26 May 1999 (age 27)
Felix James Meo (NZL)	3 April 1997 (age 29)
Tommaso Nencini (ITA)	10 September 2000 (age 25)
Andrea Piras (ITA)	5 February 2002 (age 24)

Rider	Date of birth
Lorenzo Quartucci (ITA)	5 April 1999 (age 27)
Dušan Rajović (SRB)	19 November 1997 (age 28)
Joann Rolando (ITA)	20 September 2006 (age 19)
Carlos Samudio (PAN)	5 October 1997 (age 28)
Kristian Sbaragli (ITA)	8 May 1990 (age 36)
Mark Stewart (GBR)	25 August 1995 (age 31)
Arnaud Tissières (SUI)	14 May 1996 (age 30)
Kyrylo Tsarenko (UKR)	13 October 2000 (age 25)
Luca Verrando (ITA)	12 July 2002 (age 24)
Attilio Viviani (ITA)	18 October 1996 (age 29)

== Major wins ==
2022
Stage 2 Vuelta al Táchira, Dušan Rajović
Stage 2 Tour of Antalya, Dušan Rajović
Poreč Trophy, Dušan Rajović
Serbia National Time Trial Championships, Dušan Rajović
Serbia National Road Race Championships, Dušan Rajović
Stage 3b Sibiu Cycling Tour, Stefano Gandin
Stages 1 & 8 Vuelta a Venezuela, Stefano Gandin
Stages 2 & 7 Vuelta a Venezuela, Dušan Rajović
Stage 6 Vuelta a Venezuela, Veljko Stojnić
Stage 4 Tour de la Guadeloupe, Veljko Stojnić
2023
Stage 3 Tour of Qinghai Lake, Davide Baldaccini
Stage 6 Tour of Qinghai Lake, Attilio Viviani
Cupa Max Ausnit, Nicolás Tivani
Stage 4 Tour of Hainan, Nicolas Dalla Valle
2024
Circuito del Porto, Jakub Mareczko
Stage 1b International Tour of Hellas, Jakub Mareczko
Due Giorni Marchigiana – GP Santa Rita, Kyrylo Tsarenko
Cupa Max Ausnit, Kyrylo Tsarenko
2025
Stage 2 Tour of Sharjah, Dušan Rajović
Overall Tour de Kumano, Mark Stewart

Stage 1, Dušan Rajović
Stage 3, Mark Stewart
Stage 4, Dušan Rajović

Stage 1 Tour of Japan, Dušan Rajović
2026
1st = Umag Classic, Dušan Rajović
Stage 1 & 4 Tour de Taiwan, Dušan Rajović
Velika Nagrada Novega Mesta, Tommaso Nencini
Overall Tour of Japan, Matteo Fabbro

Stage 4 (TTT)
Stage 6, Matteo Fabbro

=== Supplementary statistics ===
Grand Tours by highest finishing position
Race	2023	2024
Giro d'Italia	83	–
Tour de France	–	–
Vuelta a España	–	–
Major week-long stage races by highest finishing position
Race	2023	2024
Tour Down Under	–	–
UAE Tour	–	42
Paris–Nice	–	–
Tirreno–Adriatico	100	104
Volta a Catalunya	–	–
Tour of the Basque Country	–	–
Tour de Romandie	–	68
Critérium du Dauphiné	–	–
Tour de Suisse	–	75
Tour de Pologne	–	–
Benelux Tour	–	–
Monuments by highest finishing position
Monument	2023	2024
Milan–San Remo	–	68
Tour of Flanders	–	–
Paris–Roubaix	–	–
Liège–Bastogne–Liège	–	–
Il Lombardia	–	–
Classics by highest finishing position
Classic	2023	2024
Omloop Het Nieuwsblad	–	–
Kuurne–Brussels–Kuurne	–	–
Strade Bianche	–	51
E3 Harelbeke	–	–
Gent–Wevelgem	–	–
Dwars door Vlaanderen	–	–
Amstel Gold Race	–	–
La Flèche Wallonne	–	–
Clásica de San Sebastián	–	–
Paris–Tours	–	–

Legend
—	Did not compete
DNS	Did not start
DNF	Did not finish
NH	Not held

== National champions ==
2022
Serbia Road Race, Dušan Rajović
Serbia Time Trial, Dušan Rajović
2025
Panama Road Race, Roberto González
Panama Time Trial, Carlos Samudio
