= Li-Ning Star Cycling Team =

Chinese cycling team

Team information
- UCI code: LNS
- Registered: China
- Founded: 2020
- Discipline: Road
- Status: UCI Continental (2020–)
- Bicycles: Winspace

Key personnel
- Team manager: Sun Zhe

Team name history
- 2020 2021–: Docs Cycling Team (DCS); Li-Ning Star Cycling Team (LNS)

Li-Ning Star Cycling Team (UCI team code: LNS) is a UCI Continental team founded in 2020, that is based in Beijing, China.

== Team roster ==
As of February 2024.

Rider	Date of birth
Bai Lijun (CHN)	19 November 1988 (age 37)
Vasili Bialiauski (BLR)	21 December 1995 (age 30)
Roniel Campos (VEN)	27 July 1993 (age 33)
Li Luhao (CHN)	10 August 1999 (age 27)
Lian Shuai (CHN)	19 August 2000 (age 26)
Liu Yuze (CHN)	2 May 2004 (age 22)
Luke Mudgway (NZL)	12 June 1996 (age 30)

Rider	Date of birth
Niu Yikui (CHN)	2 August 1994 (age 32)
Cristian Raileanu (ROM)	24 January 1993 (age 33)
Shao Junqi (CHN)	11 September 1998 (age 27)
Aliaksei Shnyrko (BLR)	12 May 1994 (age 32)
Sun Wentao (CHN)	17 December 2000 (age 25)
Zhu Yanhong (CHN)	27 February 2001 (age 25)

== Major wins ==
2022
Stage 1 Tour of Qinghai Lake, Niu Yikui
Stage 4 Tour of Qinghai Lake, Shen Yutao
Stage 7 Tour of Qinghai Lake, Niu Yikui
2023
Stage 1 Chengdu Tianfu Greenway International Cycling Race, Jiang Zhihui
Stage 1 Tour of Huangshan, Jiang Zhihui
2025
Stage 5 Tour of Hainan, Alexander Salby
2026
Stage 1 Tour de Kumano, Nils Sinscheck
Stage 4 Tour de Kumano, Nils Sinscheck
