= 2024 Alpecin–Deceuninck season =

Alpecin–Deceuninck
- 2024 season
- UCI code: ADC
- Status: UCI WorldTeam
- Manager: Christoph Roodhooft (BEL); Philip Roodhooft (BEL)
- Main sponsor(s): Alpecin; Deceuninck
- Based: Belgium

Season victories
- One-day races: 9
- Stage race overall: 1
- Stage race stages: 16
- Most wins: (Belgium) Jasper Philipsen (9)

The 2024 season for the Alpecin–Deceuninck team is the team's 16th season in existence, the second as a UCI WorldTeam.

== Team roster ==
As of 5 January 2024.

Rider	Date of birth
Maurice Ballerstedt (GER)	16 January 2001 (aged 22)
Tobias Bayer (AUT)	17 November 1999 (aged 24)
Lars Boven (NED)	13 August 2001 (aged 22)
Nicola Conci (ITA)	5 January 1997 (aged 26)
Silvan Dillier (SUI)	3 August 1990 (aged 33)
Sam Gaze (NZL)	12 December 1995 (aged 28)
Robbe Ghys (BEL)	11 January 1997 (aged 26)
Michael Gogl (AUT)	4 November 1993 (aged 30)
Kaden Groves (AUS)	23 December 1998 (aged 25)
Quinten Hermans (BEL)	29 July 1995 (aged 28)
Juri Hollmann (GER)	30 August 1999 (aged 24)
Jimmy Janssens (BEL)	30 May 1989 (aged 34)
Timo Kielich (BEL)	5 August 1999 (aged 24)
Søren Kragh Andersen (DEN)	10 August 1994 (aged 29)
Axel Laurance (FRA)	13 April 2001 (aged 22)

Rider	Date of birth
Senne Leysen (BEL)	18 March 1996 (aged 27)
Xandro Meurisse (BEL)	31 January 1992 (aged 31)
Jason Osborne (GER)	20 March 1994 (aged 29)
Jasper Philipsen (BEL)	2 March 1998 (aged 25)
Edward Planckaert (BEL)	1 February 1995 (aged 28)
Jensen Plowright (AUS)	15 May 2000 (aged 23)
Jonas Rickaert (BEL)	7 February 1994 (aged 29)
Oscar Riesebeek (NED)	23 December 1992 (aged 31)
Ramon Sinkeldam (NED)	9 February 1989 (aged 34)
Henri Uhlig (GER)	1 August 2001 (aged 22)
Fabio Van den Bossche (BEL)	21 September 2000 (aged 23)
Mathieu van der Poel (NED)	19 January 1995 (aged 28)
Stan Van Tricht (BEL)	20 September 1999 (aged 24)
Luca Vergallito (ITA)	14 September 1997 (aged 26)
Gianni Vermeersch (BEL)	19 November 1992 (aged 31)

== Season victories ==
Date	Race	Competition	Rider	Country	Location	Ref.
1 February	Étoile de Bessèges, stage 2	UCI Europe Tour	Axel Laurance (FRA)	France	Rousson	
5 March	Tirreno–Adriatico, stage 2	UCI World Tour	Jasper Philipsen (BEL)	Italy	Follonica	
16 March	Milan–San Remo	UCI World Tour	Jasper Philipsen (BEL)	Italy	Sanremo	
20 March	Classic Brugge–De Panne	UCI World Tour	Jasper Philipsen (BEL)	Belgium	De Panne	
22 March	E3 Saxo Classic	UCI World Tour	Mathieu van der Poel (NED)	Belgium	Harelbeke	
22 March	Volta a Catalunya, stage 5	UCI World Tour	Axel Laurance (FRA)	Spain	Viladecans	
30 March	Volta NXT Classic	UCI Europe Tour	Timo Kielich (BEL)	Netherlands	Limburg	
31 March	Tour of Flanders	UCI World Tour	Mathieu van der Poel (NED)	Belgium	Oudenaarde	
3 April	Tour of the Basque Country, stage 3	UCI World Tour	Quinten Hermans (BEL)	Spain	Altsasu	
7 April	Paris–Roubaix	UCI World Tour	Mathieu van der Poel (NED)	France	Roubaix	
24 May	Tour of Norway, stage 2	UCI ProSeries	Axel Laurance (FRA)	Norway	Gullingen	
26 May	Tour of Norway, overall	UCI ProSeries	Axel Laurance (FRA)	Norway		
8 June	Dwars door het Hageland	UCI ProSeries	Gianni Vermeersch (BEL)	Belgium	Diest	
14 June	Tour of Belgium, stage 3	UCI ProSeries	Jasper Philipsen (BEL)	Belgium	Scherpenheuvel-Zichem	
7 July	Tour of Qinghai Lake, stage 1	UCI ProSeries	Jensen Plowright (AUS)	China	Xining	
9 July	Tour de France, stage 10	UCI World Tour	Jasper Philipsen (BEL)	France	Saint-Amand-Montrond	
11 July	Tour of Qinghai Lake, stage 5	UCI ProSeries	Jensen Plowright (AUS)	China	Xihaizhen	
12 July	Tour de France, stage 13	UCI World Tour	Jasper Philipsen (BEL)	France	Pau	
16 July	Tour de France, stage 16	UCI World Tour	Jasper Philipsen (BEL)	France	Nîmes	
18 August	Vuelta a España, stage 2	UCI World Tour	Kaden Groves (AUS)	Portugal	Ourém	
31 August	Renewi Tour, stage 4	UCI World Tour	Jasper Philipsen (BEL)	Belgium	Aalter	
31 August	Vuelta a España, stage 14	UCI World Tour	Kaden Groves (AUS)	Spain	Villablino	
4 September	Vuelta a España, stage 17	UCI World Tour	Kaden Groves (AUS)	Spain	Santander	
18 September	Tour de Luxembourg, stage 1	UCI ProSeries	Mathieu van der Poel (NED)	Luxembourg	Luxembourg	
3 October	Münsterland Giro	UCI ProSeries	Jasper Philipsen (BEL)	Germany	Münster	
7 October	Coppa Bernocci	UCI ProSeries	Stan Van Tricht (BEL)	Italy	Legnano	
