= 2025 Burgos Burpellet BH season =

Burgos Burpellet BH
- 2025 season
- UCI code: BBH
- Status: UCI ProTeam
- Manager: Julio Izquierdo (ESP)
- Main sponsor(s): BH; Burpellet
- Based: Spain
- Bicycles: BH
- Groupset: Shimano

Season victories
- Stage race stages: 2
- National Championships: 1
- Most wins: (Spain) Mario Aparicio (Guatemala) Sergio Chumil (Uruguay) Eric Fagúndez (1 win each)

The 2025 season for Burgos Burpellet BH is the 20th, and the 8th as a UCI ProTeam.

== Team roster ==
All ages are as of 1 January 2025, the first day of the 2025 season.

As of 2 January 2025.

Rider	Date of birth
Clément Alleno (FRA)	8 October 2000 (aged 24)
Rodrigo Álvarez (ESP)	24 August 1999 (aged 25)
Antonio Angulo (ESP)	18 February 1994 (aged 30)
Mario Aparicio (ESP)	23 April 2000 (aged 24)
Georgios Bouglas (GRE)	17 November 1990 (aged 34)
Josh Burnett (NZL)	26 October 2000 (aged 24)
Daniel Cavia (ESP)	2 June 2002 (aged 22)
Sergio Chumil (GUA)	8 October 2000 (aged 24)
Hugo de la Calle (ESP)	12 July 2004 (aged 20)
David Delgado (ESP)	13 July 2000 (aged 24)
José Manuel Díaz (ESP)	18 January 1995 (aged 29)
Eric Fagúndez (URU)	19 August 1998 (aged 26)

Rider	Date of birth
José Luis Faura (ESP)	15 September 2000 (aged 24)
Sinuhé Fernández (ESP)	15 June 2000 (aged 24)
Ángel Fuentes (ESP)	5 November 1996 (aged 28)
Carlos García Pierna (ESP)	23 July 1999 (aged 25)
George Jackson (NZL)	20 February 2000 (aged 24)
Vojtěch Kmínek (CZE)	11 September 2000 (aged 24)
Tomoya Koyama (JPN)	18 July 1998 (aged 26)
Merhawi Kudus (ERI)	23 January 1994 (aged 30)
David Martín (ESP)	19 February 1999 (aged 25)
Ander Okamika (ESP)	2 April 1993 (aged 31)
Jambaljamts Sainbayar (MGL)	4 September 1996 (aged 28)

== Season victories ==
Date	Race	Competition	Rider	Country	Location	Ref.
24 January	Tour of Sharjah, stage 1	UCI Asia Tour	Mario Aparicio (ESP)	United Arab Emirates	Kalba	
1 March	O Gran Camiño, stage 4	UCI Europe Tour	Sergio Chumil (GUA)	Spain	O Cebreiro	

== National, Continental, and World Champions ==
Date	Discipline	Jersey	Rider	Country	Location	Ref.
7 February	Uruguayan National Time Trial Championships		Eric Fagúndez (URU)	Uruguay	Paysandú	
