= 2009 Vuelta a Castilla y León =

Race details
- Dates: 23 March – 27 March
- Stages: 5
- Distance: 659.3 km (409.7 mi)
- Winning time: 15h 33' 26"

Results
| Jersey awarded to the overall winner | Winner | Levi Leipheimer (USA) | (Astana) |
| | Second | Alberto Contador (ESP) | (Astana) |
| | Third | David Zabriskie (USA) | (Garmin–Slipstream) |
| | Points | Alejandro Valverde (ESP) | (Caisse d'Epargne) |
| | Mountains | Alejandro Valverde (ESP) | (Caisse d'Epargne) |
| | Combination | Alejandro Valverde (ESP) | (Caisse d'Epargne) |
| | Team | (Netherlands) Rabobank | |

The 2009 Vuelta a Castilla y León was the 24th edition of the Vuelta a Castilla y León road cycling stage race, started on 23 March in Paredes de Nava, and concluded on 27 March in Valladolid. The race was won by Levi Leipheimer.

== Teams ==
Seventeen teams of up to eight riders started the race:

- Astana
- Caisse d'Epargne
- Euskaltel–Euskadi
- Fuji–Servetto
- Garmin–Slipstream
- Rabobank
- Bbox Bouygues Telecom
- Contentpolis–Ampo
- Xacobeo–Galicia
- ISD
- Cervélo TestTeam
- Burgos Monumental–Castilla y León
- Orbea
- Barbot–Siper
- Rock Racing
- Andalucía–Cajasur
- Liberty Seguros

== Stages ==
=== Stage 1 ===
23 March 2009 – Paredes de Nava to Baltanás, 168.3 km (104.6 mi)

Stage 1 results

| | Cyclist | Team | Time |
|---|---|---|---|
| 1 | Joaquin Sobrino (ESP) | Burgos Monumental-Castilla y Leon | 4h 31' 53" |
| 2 | David Vitoria (SUI) | Rock Racing | s.t. |
| 3 | José Joaquín Rojas (ESP) | Caisse d'Epargne | s.t. |
| 4 | Rubén Pérez (ESP) | Euskaltel–Euskadi | s.t. |
| 5 | Manuel Antonio Leal Cardoso (POR) | Liberty Seguros | s.t. |

General Classification after Stage 1

| | Cyclist | Team | Time |
|---|---|---|---|
| 1 | Joaquin Sobrino (ESP) | Burgos Monumental-Castilla y Leon | 4h 31' 53" |
| 2 | David Vitoria (SUI) | Rock Racing | s.t. |
| 3 | José Joaquín Rojas (ESP) | Caisse d'Epargne | s.t. |
| 4 | Rubén Pérez (ESP) | Euskaltel–Euskadi | s.t. |
| 5 | Manuel Antonio Leal Cardoso (POR) | Liberty Seguros | s.t. |

=== Stage 2 ===
24 March 2009 – Palencia (ITT), 28.2 km (17.5 mi)

Stage 2 results

| | Cyclist | Team | Time |
|---|---|---|---|
| 1 | Levi Leipheimer (USA) | Astana | 33' 17" |
| 2 | Alberto Contador (ESP) | Astana | + 16" |
| 3 | David Zabriskie (USA) | Garmin–Slipstream | + 22" |
| 4 | Stef Clement (NED) | Rabobank | + 49" |
| 5 | Denis Menchov (RUS) | Rabobank | + 55" |

General Classification after Stage 2

| | Cyclist | Team | Time |
|---|---|---|---|
| 1 | Levi Leipheimer (USA) | Astana | 5h 5' 10" |
| 2 | Alberto Contador (ESP) | Astana | + 16" |
| 3 | David Zabriskie (USA) | Garmin–Slipstream | + 22" |
| 4 | Stef Clement (NED) | Rabobank | + 49" |
| 5 | Denis Menchov (RUS) | Rabobank | + 55" |

=== Stage 3 ===
25 March 2009 – Sahagún to Estación Inv. De San Isiro, 156.9 km (97.5 mi)

Stage 3 results

| | Cyclist | Team | Time |
|---|---|---|---|
| 1 | Alejandro Valverde (ESP) | Caisse d'Epargne | 3h 28' 16" |
| 2 | Rubén Plaza (ESP) | Liberty Seguros | s.t. |
| 3 | Javier Moreno (ESP) | Andalucía–CajaSur | s.t. |
| 4 | José Alberto Benítez (ESP) | Fuji–Servetto | s.t. |
| 5 | Rubén Pérez (ESP) | Euskaltel–Euskadi | s.t. |

General Classification after Stage 3

| | Cyclist | Team | Time |
|---|---|---|---|
| 1 | Levi Leipheimer (USA) | Astana | 8h 33' 26" |
| 2 | Alberto Contador (ESP) | Astana | + 16" |
| 3 | David Zabriskie (USA) | Garmin–Slipstream | + 22" |
| 4 | Stef Clement (NED) | Rabobank | + 49" |
| 5 | Denis Menchov (RUS) | Rabobank | + 55" |

=== Stage 4 ===
26 March 2009 – Santa María Del Páramo to Galende-Laguna De Los Peces, 145.4 km (90.3 mi)

Stage 4 results

| | Cyclist | Team | Time |
|---|---|---|---|
| 1 | Juan José Cobo (ESP) | Fuji–Servetto | 3h 42' 3" |
| 2 | Denis Menchov (RUS) | Rabobank | + 8" |
| 3 | Javier Moreno (ESP) | Andalucía–CajaSur | + 9" |
| 4 | Alejandro Valverde (ESP) | Caisse d'Epargne | s.t. |
| 5 | Philip Deignan (IRL) | Cervélo TestTeam | s.t. |

General Classification after Stage 4

| | Cyclist | Team | Time |
|---|---|---|---|
| 1 | Levi Leipheimer (USA) | Astana | 12h 15' 38" |
| 2 | Alberto Contador (ESP) | Astana | + 16" |
| 3 | David Zabriskie (USA) | Garmin–Slipstream | + 22" |
| 4 | Stef Clement (NED) | Rabobank | + 49" |
| 5 | Denis Menchov (RUS) | Rabobank | + 54" |

=== Stage 5 ===
27 March 2009 – Benavente to Valladolid, 152.5 km (94.8 mi)

Stage 5 results

| | Cyclist | Team | Time |
|---|---|---|---|
| 1 | Alejandro Valverde (ESP) | Caisse d'Epargne | 3h 17' 46" |
| 2 | José Joaquín Rojas (ESP) | Caisse d'Epargne | s.t. |
| 3 | Pablo Urtasun (ESP) | Euskaltel–Euskadi | s.t. |
| 4 | Ricardo Serrano (ESP) | Fuji–Servetto | + 2" |
| 5 | Igor Abakoumov (BEL) | ISD | s.t. |

General Classification after Stage 5

| | Cyclist | Team | Time |
|---|---|---|---|
| 1 | Levi Leipheimer (USA) | Astana | 15h 33' 26" |
| 2 | Alberto Contador (ESP) | Astana | + 16" |
| 3 | David Zabriskie (USA) | Garmin–Slipstream | + 22" |
| 4 | Stef Clement (NED) | Rabobank | + 49" |
| 5 | Denis Menchov (RUS) | Rabobank | + 1' 07" |

== Final standings ==
General classification

| | Cyclist | Team | Time |
|---|---|---|---|
| 1 | Levi Leipheimer (USA) | Astana | 15h 33' 26" |
| 2 | Alberto Contador (ESP) | Astana | + 16" |
| 3 | David Zabriskie (USA) | Garmin–Slipstream | + 22" |
| 4 | Stef Clement (NED) | Rabobank | + 49" |
| 5 | Denis Menchov (RUS) | Rabobank | + 1' 07" |

Points classification

| | Cyclist | Team | Points |
|---|---|---|---|
| 1 | Alejandro Valverde (ESP) | Caisse d'Epargne | 64 |
| 2 | José Joaquín Rojas (ESP) | Caisse d'Epargne | 43 |
| 3 | Alberto Contador (ESP) | Astana | 38 |
| 4 | Denis Menchov (RUS) | Rabobank | 36 |
| 5 | Levi Leipheimer (USA) | Astana | 33 |

Mountains classification

| | Cyclist | Team | Points |
|---|---|---|---|
| 1 | Alejandro Valverde (ESP) | Caisse d'Epargne | 20 |
| 2 | Juan José Cobo (ESP) | Fuji–Servetto | 10 |
| 3 | Javier Moreno (ESP) | Andalucía–CajaSur | 9 |
| 4 | Denis Menchov (RUS) | Rabobank | 8 |
| 5 | Xavier Tondo (ESP) | Andalucía–CajaSur | 8 |

Combination classification

| | Cyclist | Team | Points |
|---|---|---|---|
| 1 | Alejandro Valverde (ESP) | Caisse d'Epargne | 5 |
| 2 | Denis Menchov (RUS) | Rabobank | 5 |
| 3 | Alberto Contador (ESP) | Astana | 5 |
| 4 | Levi Leipheimer (USA) | Astana | 5 |
| 5 | Juan José Cobo (ESP) | Fuji–Servetto | 5 |

Team Classification

| | Team | Time |
|---|---|---|
| 1 | Rabobank | 46h 44' 45" |
| 2 | Cervélo TestTeam | + 4' 02" |
| 3 | Caisse d'Epargne | + 4' 03" |
| 4 | Astana | + 4' 56" |
| 5 | Andalucía–CajaSur | + 5' 02" |

== Jersey progress ==
| Stage (Winner) | General Classification | Points Classification | Mountains Classification | Combination classification | Team Classification |
|---|---|---|---|---|---|
| Stage 1 (Joaquin Sobrino) | Joaquin Sobrino | Joaquin Sobrino | José Antonio López | Joaquin Sobrino | Caisse d'Epargne |
| Stage 2 (ITT) (Levi Leipheimer) | Levi Leipheimer | Levi Leipheimer | José Antonio López | Levi Leipheimer | Astana |
| Stage 3 (Alejandro Valverde) | Levi Leipheimer | Rubén Pérez | Alejandro Valverde | Alejandro Valverde | Astana |
| Stage 4 (Juan José Cobo) | Levi Leipheimer | Alejandro Valverde | Alejandro Valverde | Denis Menchov | Rabobank |
| Stage 5 (Alejandro Valverde) | Levi Leipheimer | Alejandro Valverde | Alejandro Valverde | Alejandro Valverde | Rabobank |
| Final | Levi Leipheimer | Alejandro Valverde | Alejandro Valverde | Alejandro Valverde | Rabobank |

== Withdrawals ==
| Type | Stage | Cyclist | Team | Reason |
|---|---|---|---|---|
| DNF | 1 | Lance Armstrong (USA) | Astana | Fractured collarbone sustained in crash |
