= 2026 Baku-Khankendi Azerbaijan Cycling Race =

Cycling race

2026 UCI Europe Tour

Race details
- Dates: 10-14 May 2026
- Stages: 5
- Distance: 849.8 km (528.0 mi)
- Winning time: 19h 6' 43"

Results
Jersey awarded to the overall winner	Winner	Josh Burnett (NZL)	(Burgos Burpellet BH)
	Second	Henok Mulueberhan (ERI)	(XDS Astana Team)
	Third	Alexandre Balmer (SUI)	(Solution Tech NIPPO Rali)
Jersey awarded to the points classification winner	Points	Henok Mulueberhan (ERI)	(XDS Astana Team)
Jersey awarded to the mountains classification winner	Mountains	Lennert Teugels (BEL)	(Tarteletto–Isorex)
Jersey awarded to the young rider classification winner	Young rider	Iker Gómez (ESP)	(Equipo Kern Pharma)
	Team	(Spain) Burgos Burpellet BH	

The 2026 Baku-Khankendi Azerbaijan Cycling Race (Azerbaijani: 2026 Bakı-Xankəndi Azərbaycan Velosiped Yarışına) is a road cycling stage race, held in Azerbaijan. It is part of the 2026 UCI Europe Tour as a category 2.1 race. The race is the 7th edition of the Tour d'Azerbaïdjan, and the first being held with the new name Baku-Khankendi Azerbaijan Cycling Race since the previous edition 9 years ago. The race began on the 10th of May in Baku and finished on the 14th of May in Khankendi.

== Teams ==
One UCI WorldTeam, four UCI ProTeams, seventeen UCI Continental teams and two national teams make up the twenty-four teams that participated in the race.

UCI WorldTeams

- XDS Astana Team

UCI ProTeams

- Bardiani–CSF 7 Saber
- Burgos Burpellet BH
- Equipo Kern Pharma
- Solution Tech NIPPO Rali

UCI Continental Teams

- ASC Monsters Indonesia
- EuroCyclingTrips–CCN
- Li-Ning Star
- Madar Pro Cycling Team
- Mazowsze Serce Polski
- Muğla Büyükşehir Belediyesi Spor Kulübü
- Óbidos Cycling Team
- Quick Pro Team
- Roojai Insurance Winspace
- Sidi Ali–Unlock Sports Team
- Spor Toto Cycling Team
- Tarteletto–Isorex
- Team Vino–North Qazaqstan Region
- Team Medellín–EPM
- Terengganu Cycling Team
- Universe Cycling Team
- Victoria Sports Pro Cycling

National Teams

- Azerbaijan
- Uzbekistan

== Route ==
Stage characteristics and winners
Stage	Date	Course	Distance	Type	Stage winner
1	10 May	Baku to Sumqayit	159.3 km (99.0 mi)	Flat stage	Aliaksei Shnyrko (BLR)
2	11 May	Baku to Ismayilli	193.3 km (120.1 mi)	Hilly stage	Yevgeniy Fedorov (KAZ)
3	12 May	Gabala to Mingachevir	162.9 km (101.2 mi)	Flat stage	Gleb Syritsa
4	13 May	Ganja to Naftalan	152.8 km (94.9 mi)	Hilly stage	Marco Manenti (ITA)
5	14 May	Tartar to Khankendi	181.5 km (112.8 mi)	Mountain stage	Josh Burnett (NZL)
Total			849.8 km (528.0 mi)		

== Stages ==
=== Stage 1 ===
10 May 2026 — Baku to Sumqayit, 159.3 km (99.0 mi)

Stage 1 Result
Rank	Rider	Team	Time
1	Aliaksei Shnyrko (BLR)	Li-Ning Star	3h 30' 2"
2	Gleb Syritsa	XDS Astana Team	+ 0"
3	Timothy Dupont (BEL)	Tarteletto–Isorex	+ 0"
4	Filippo Cettolin (ITA)	Bardiani–CSF 7 Saber	+ 0"
5	Cristian Pita (ECU)	Roojai Insurance Winspace	+ 0"
6	Tilen Finkšt (SLO)	Solution Tech NIPPO Rali	+ 0"
7	Marco Manenti (ITA)	Bardiani–CSF 7 Saber	+ 0"
8	Sander Inion (BEL)	Madar Pro Cycling Team	+ 0"
9	Iñigo Elosegui (ESP)	Equipo Kern Pharma	+ 0"
10	Yevgeniy Fedorov (KAZ)	XDS Astana Team	+ 0"

General classification after Stage 1
Rank	Rider	Team	Time
1	Aliaksei Shnyrko (BLR)	Li-Ning Star	3h 29' 52"
2	Gleb Syritsa	XDS Astana Team	+ 4"
3	Timothy Dupont (BEL)	Tarteletto–Isorex	+ 6"
4	Filippo Cettolin (ITA)	Bardiani–CSF 7 Saber	+ 10"
5	Cristian Pita (ECU)	Roojai Insurance Winspace	+ 10"
6	Tilen Finkšt (SLO)	Solution Tech NIPPO Rali	+ 10"
7	Marco Manenti (ITA)	Bardiani–CSF 7 Saber	+ 10"
8	Sander Inion (BEL)	Madar Pro Cycling Team	+ 10"
9	Iñigo Elosegui (ESP)	Equipo Kern Pharma	+ 10"
10	Yevgeniy Fedorov (KAZ)	XDS Astana Team	+ 10"

=== Stage 2 ===
11 May 2026 — Baku to Ismayilli, 193.3 km (120.1 mi)

Stage 2 Result
Rank	Rider	Team	Time
1	Yevgeniy Fedorov (KAZ)	XDS Astana Team	4h 41' 38"
2	Alexandre Balmer (SUI)	Solution Tech NIPPO Rali	+ 0"
3	Eric Fagúndez (URU)	Burgos Burpellet BH	+ 9"
4	Santiago Umba (COL)	Solution Tech NIPPO Rali	+ 9"
5	Aaron Gate (NZL)	XDS Astana Team	+ 9"
6	Cristian Raileanu (ROM)	Li-Ning Star	+ 9"
7	Henok Mulueberhan (ERI)	XDS Astana Team	+ 9"
8	Lennert Teugels (BEL)	Tarteletto–Isorex	+ 9"
9	David Delgado (ESP)	Quick Pro Team	+ 9"
10	Calum Johnston (GBR)	Li-Ning Star	+ 9"

General classification after Stage 2
Rank	Rider	Team	Time
1	Yevgeniy Fedorov (KAZ)	XDS Astana Team	8h 11' 30"
2	Alexandre Balmer (SUI)	Solution Tech NIPPO Rali	+ 4"
3	Henok Mulueberhan (ERI)	XDS Astana Team	+ 14"
4	Eric Fagúndez (URU)	Burgos Burpellet BH	+ 15"
5	Aaron Gate (NZL)	XDS Astana Team	+ 16"
6	Hugo Aznar (ESP)	Equipo Kern Pharma	+ 18"
7	Luca Covili (ITA)	Bardiani–CSF 7 Saber	+ 19"
8	Santiago Umba (COL)	Solution Tech NIPPO Rali	+ 19"
9	Calum Johnston (GBR)	Li-Ning Star	+ 19"
10	Josh Burnett (NZL)	Burgos Burpellet BH	+ 19"

=== Stage 3 ===
12 May 2026 — Gabala to Mingachevir, 162.9 km (101.2 mi)

Stage 3 Result
Rank	Rider	Team	Time
1	Gleb Syritsa	XDS Astana Team	3h 26' 43"
2	Timothy Dupont (BEL)	Tarteletto–Isorex	+ 0"
3	Cristian Pita (ECU)	Roojai Insurance Winspace	+ 0"
4	Muhammad Hafizh (IDN)	ASC Monsters Indonesia	+ 0"
5	Marco Manenti (ITA)	Bardiani–CSF 7 Saber	+ 0"
6	Eric Fagúndez (URU)	Burgos Burpellet BH	+ 0"
7	Filippo Cettolin (ITA)	Bardiani–CSF 7 Saber	+ 0"
8	Hubert Grygowski (POL)	Mazowsze Serce Polski	+ 0"
9	Alvaro Navas (ESP)	Óbidos Cycling Team	+ 0"
10	Tom Wijfje (NED)	Universe Cycling Team	+ 0"

General classification after Stage 3
Rank	Rider	Team	Time
1	Yevgeniy Fedorov (KAZ)	XDS Astana Team	11h 38' 13"
2	Alexandre Balmer (SUI)	Solution Tech NIPPO Rali	+ 4"
3	Henok Mulueberhan (ERI)	XDS Astana Team	+ 14"
4	Eric Fagúndez (URU)	Burgos Burpellet BH	+ 15"
5	Aaron Gate (NZL)	XDS Astana Team	+ 16"
6	Hugo Aznar (ESP)	Equipo Kern Pharma	+ 18"
7	Luca Covili (ITA)	Bardiani–CSF 7 Saber	+ 19"
8	Josh Burnett (NZL)	Burgos Burpellet BH	+ 19"
9	Santiago Umba (COL)	Solution Tech NIPPO Rali	+ 19"
10	Urko Berrade (ESP)	Equipo Kern Pharma	+ 19"

=== Stage 4 ===
13 May 2026 — Ganja to Naftalan, 152.8 km (94.9 mi)

Stage 4 Result
Rank	Rider	Team	Time
1	Marco Manenti (ITA)	Bardiani–CSF 7 Saber	3h 11' 46"
2	Henok Mulueberhan (ERI)	XDS Astana Team	+ 0"
3	Cristian Pita (ECU)	Roojai Insurance Winspace	+ 0"
4	Sander Inion (BEL)	Madar Pro Cycling Team	+ 0"
5	Muhammad Hafizh (IDN)	ASC Monsters Indonesia	+ 0"
6	Hugo Aznar (ESP)	Equipo Kern Pharma	+ 0"
7	Yevgeniy Fedorov (KAZ)	XDS Astana Team	+ 0"
8	Franciszek Kaczorowski (POL)	Mazowsze Serce Polski	+ 0"
9	Fabrice Lefevre (BEL)	Tarteletto–Isorex	+ 0"
10	Tilen Finkšt (SLO)	Solution Tech NIPPO Rali	+ 0"

General classification after Stage 4
Rank	Rider	Team	Time
1	Yevgeniy Fedorov (KAZ)	XDS Astana Team	14h 49' 59"
2	Alexandre Balmer (SUI)	Solution Tech NIPPO Rali	+ 4"
3	Henok Mulueberhan (ERI)	XDS Astana Team	+ 8"
4	Eric Fagúndez (URU)	Burgos Burpellet BH	+ 15"
5	Aaron Gate (NZL)	XDS Astana Team	+ 16"
6	Hugo Aznar (ESP)	Equipo Kern Pharma	+ 18"
7	Luca Covili (ITA)	Bardiani–CSF 7 Saber	+ 19"
8	Urko Berrade (ESP)	Equipo Kern Pharma	+ 19"
9	Josh Burnett (NZL)	Burgos Burpellet BH	+ 19"
10	Lennert Teugels (BEL)	Tarteletto–Isorex	+ 19"

=== Stage 5 ===
14 May 2026 — Tartar to Khankendi, 181.5 km (112.8 mi)

Stage 5 Result
Rank	Rider	Team	Time
1	Josh Burnett (NZL)	Burgos Burpellet BH	4h 16' 35"
2	Henok Mulueberhan (ERI)	XDS Astana Team	+ 12"
3	Eric Fagúndez (URU)	Burgos Burpellet BH	+ 12"
4	Alessio Martinelli (ITA)	Bardiani–CSF 7 Saber	+ 12"
5	Santiago Umba (COL)	Solution Tech NIPPO Rali	+ 12"
6	Gianni Marchand (BEL)	Tarteletto–Isorex	+ 12"
7	Luca Covili (ITA)	Bardiani–CSF 7 Saber	+ 12"
8	Alex Tolio (ITA)	Bardiani–CSF 7 Saber	+ 12"
9	Urko Berrade (ESP)	Equipo Kern Pharma	+ 12"
10	Diego Uriarte (ESP)	Equipo Kern Pharma	+ 12"

General classification after Stage 5
Rank	Rider	Team	Time
1	Josh Burnett (NZL)	Burgos Burpellet BH	19h 6' 43"
2	Henok Mulueberhan (ERI)	XDS Astana Team	+ 3"
3	Alexandre Balmer (SUI)	Solution Tech NIPPO Rali	+ 7"
4	Eric Fagúndez (URU)	Burgos Burpellet BH	+ 14"
5	Luca Covili (ITA)	Bardiani–CSF 7 Saber	+ 22"
6	Urko Berrade (ESP)	Equipo Kern Pharma	+ 22"
7	Santiago Umba (COL)	Solution Tech NIPPO Rali	+ 22"
8	Diego Uriarte (ESP)	Equipo Kern Pharma	+ 22"
9	Alessio Martinelli (ITA)	Bardiani–CSF 7 Saber	+ 22"
10	Carlos García Pierna (ESP)	Burgos Burpellet BH	+ 22"

== Classification leadership table ==
Classification leadership by stage
Stage	Winner	General classification	Points classification	Mountains classification	Young rider classification	Team classification
1	Aliaksei Shnyrko	Aliaksei Shnyrko	Aliaksei Shnyrko	Yorben Lauryssen	Ksawier Garnek	Bardiani–CSF 7 Saber
2	Yevgeniy Fedorov	Yevgeniy Fedorov	Yevgeniy Fedorov	Lennert Teugels	Iker Gómez	XDS Astana Team
3	Gleb Syritsa	Yevgeniy Fedorov	Gleb Syritsa	Lennert Teugels	Iker Gómez	XDS Astana Team
4	Marco Manenti	Yevgeniy Fedorov	Marco Manenti	Lennert Teugels	Iker Gómez	XDS Astana Team
5	Josh Burnett	Josh Burnett	Henok Mulueberhan	Lennert Teugels	Iker Gómez	Burgos Burpellet BH
Final		Josh Burnett	Henok Mulueberhan	Lennert Teugels	Iker Gómez	Burgos Burpellet BH

- On Stage 2, Gleb Syritsa, who was second in the points classification, wore the green jersey, because first-placed Aliaksei Shnyrko wore the blue jersey as the leader of the general classification.
- On Stage 3, Shnyrko, who was second in the points classification, wore the green jersey, because first-placed Yevgeniy Fedorov wore the blue jersey as the leader of the general classification.

== Classification standings ==
Legend
Denotes the leader of the general classification	Denotes the leader of the mountains classification
Denotes the leader of the points classification	Denotes the leader of the young rider classification

=== General classification ===
Final general classification(1–10)
Rank	Rider	Team	Time
1	Josh Burnett (NZL)	Burgos Burpellet BH	19h 6' 43"
2	Henok Mulueberhan (ERI)	XDS Astana Team	+ 3"
3	Alexandre Balmer (SUI)	Solution Tech NIPPO Rali	+ 7"
4	Eric Fagúndez (URU)	Burgos Burpellet BH	+ 14"
5	Luca Covili (ITA)	Bardiani–CSF 7 Saber	+ 22"
6	Urko Berrade (ESP)	Equipo Kern Pharma	+ 22"
7	Santiago Umba (COL)	Solution Tech NIPPO Rali	+ 22"
8	Diego Uriarte (ESP)	Equipo Kern Pharma	+ 22"
9	Alessio Martinelli (ITA)	Bardiani–CSF 7 Saber	+ 22"
10	Carlos García Pierna (ESP)	Burgos Burpellet BH	+ 22"

=== Points classification ===
Final points classification (1–10)
Rank	Rider	Team	Points
1	Henok Mulueberhan (ERI)	XDS Astana Team	75
2	Cristian Pita (ECU)	Roojai Insurance Winspace	67
3	Eric Fagúndez (URU)	Burgos Burpellet BH	66
4	Marco Manenti (ITA)	Bardiani–CSF 7 Saber	64
5	Gleb Syritsa	XDS Astana Team	55
6	Yevgeniy Fedorov (KAZ)	XDS Astana Team	52
7	Timothy Dupont (BEL)	Tarteletto–Isorex	47
8	Santiago Umba (COL)	Solution Tech NIPPO Rali	38
9	Muhammad Hafizh (IDN)	ASC Monsters Indonesia	38
10	Filippo Cettolin (ITA)	Bardiani–CSF 7 Saber	34

=== Mountains classification ===
Final mountains classification (1-10)
Rank	Rider	Team	Points
1	Lennert Teugels (BEL)	Tarteletto–Isorex	20
2	Josh Burnett (NZL)	Burgos Burpellet BH	17
3	David Delgado (ESP)	Quick Pro Team	15
4	Alexandre Balmer (SUI)	Solution Tech NIPPO Rali	10
5	Luca Covili (ITA)	Bardiani–CSF 7 Saber	7
6	David Alejandro Gonzalez (COL)	Team Medellín–EPM	5
7	Mustafa Tekin (TUR)	Spor Toto Cycling Team	5
8	Santiago Umba (COL)	Solution Tech NIPPO Rali	5
9	Jambaljamts Sainbayar (MGL)	Burgos Burpellet BH	5
10	Eric Fagúndez (URU)	Burgos Burpellet BH	4

=== Young rider classification ===
Final young rider classification (1–10)
Rank	Rider	Team	Time
1	Iker Gómez (ESP)	Equipo Kern Pharma	19h 18' 15"
2	Franciszek Matuszewski (POL)	Mazowsze Serce Polski	+ 6' 20"
3	Antoni Muryj (POL)	Mazowsze Serce Polski	+ 6' 50"
4	Muhammad Syelhan (IDN)	ASC Monsters Indonesia	+ 7' 5"
5	Luca Verrando (ITA)	Solution Tech NIPPO Rali	+ 9' 27"
6	Yegor Logachyev (KAZ)	Team Vino–North Qazaqstan Region	+ 9' 45"
7	Ksawier Garnek (POL)	Mazowsze Serce Polski	+ 10' 1"
8	Diyor Takhirov (UZB)	Uzbekistan	+ 11' 15"
9	Samandar Janikulov (UZB)	Uzbekistan	+ 12' 49"
10	Oskar Küüt (EST)	Quick Pro Team	+ 19' 15"

=== Team classification ===
Final team classification (1–10)
Rank	Team	Time
1	(Spain) Burgos Burpellet BH	57h 21' 3"
2	(Italy) Bardiani–CSF 7 Saber	+ 12"
3	(Spain) Equipo Kern Pharma	+ 1' 24"
4	(Kazakhstan) XDS Astana Team	+ 1' 37"
5	(China) Li-Ning Star	+ 3' 15"
6	(Italy) Solution Tech NIPPO Rali	+ 9' 38"
7	(Belgium) Tarteletto–Isorex	+ 15' 19"
8	(Colombia) Team Medellín–EPM	+ 35' 3"
9	(Estonia) Quick Pro Team	+ 42' 35"
10	(Malaysia) Terengganu Cycling Team	+ 49' 25"
