= List of cycling teams in Spain =

List of 2017 UCI cycling teams in Spain:

== UCI ProTeams ==
- Movistar Team: Website

== Professional Continental Teams ==
- Caja Rural–Seguros RGA: Website
- Burgos BH: Website

== Continental Teams ==
- Euskadi Baque Country - Murias: Website
