= Beistegui =

Beistegui is a surname. Notable people with the surname include:

- Carlos de Beistegui (1895–1970), eccentric Spanish-French multi-millionaire
- Miguel de Beistegui (born 1966), Professor of Philosophy at the University of Warwick

== See also ==
- Beistegui Hermanos, a Spanish bicycle manufacturer
