= Aliaksei Shnyrko =

Belarusian cyclist (born 1994)

Personal information
- Born: 12 May 1994 (age 32) Minsk, Belarus

Cycling career
- Sport: Cycling
- Current team: Li-Ning Star
- Discipline: Road
- Role: Rider
- Rider type: Sprinter

Amateur teams
- 2013: AC Bisontine
- 2015–2017: RCOP Belarus
- 2016: Big Hunter–Seanese–Zaghe
- 2022: Velobakyi Cycling Team

Professional teams
- 2017–2018: RTS–Monton Racing Team
- 2019: Ningxia Sports Lottery–Livall Cycling Team
- 2020–2021: Minsk Cycling Club
- 2023–: Li-Ning Star

Aliaksei Shnyrko (born 12 May 1994) is a Belarusian professional racing cyclist, who currently rides for UCI Continental team Li-Ning Star.

A sprinter, Shnyrko took his first pro win in November 2019 on stage seven of the Tour of Fuzhou. In May 2026, he won the opening stage of the Baku-Khankendi Azerbaijan Cycling Race. In August, he won two stages of the Trans-Himalaya Cycling Race in China.

== Major results ==
2017
6th Horizon Park Race Maidan
2019 (1 pro win)
1st Stage 7 Tour of Fuzhou
2020
3rd GP Antalya
3rd GP Belek
2024
1st Stage 4 Tour of Bostonliq
2026 (3)
1st Stages 2 & 4 Trans-Himalaya Cycling Race
1st Stage 1 Baku-Khankendi Azerbaijan Cycling Race
1st Stage 4 Pune Grand Tour
1st Stage 1 Tour of Antalya
1st Stage 1 Tour of Bostonliq
10th Overall Grand Prix Fergana
