= Santiago Umba =

Colombian cyclist

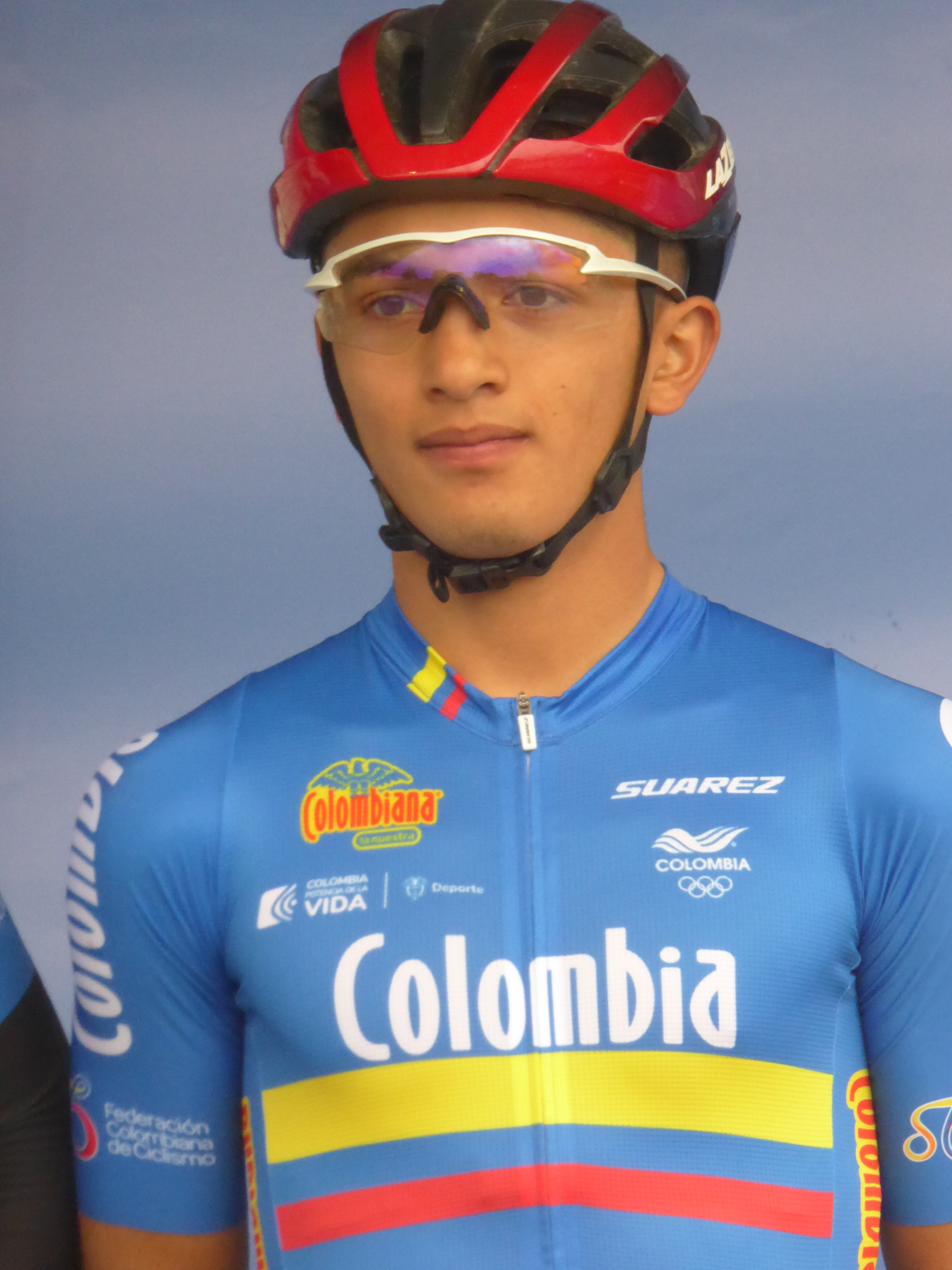
- Umba in 2023

Personal information
- Full name: Abner Santiago Umba López
- Born: 20 November 2002 (age 23) Arcabuco, Colombia
- Height: 1.72 m (5 ft 8 in)
- Weight: 58 kg (128 lb)

Cycling career
- Sport: Cycling
- Current team: Solution Tech NIPPO Rali
- Discipline: Road
- Role: Rider
- Rider type: Climber

Amateur team
- 2019–2020: Arcabuco–Ingeniería de Vías

Professional teams
- 2021–2023: Androni Giocattoli–Sidermec
- 2024: Astana Qazaqstan Team
- 2025: XDS Astana Development Team
- 2026–: Solution Tech NIPPO Rali

Abner Santiago Umba López (born 20 November 2002) is a Colombian cyclist, who currently rides for UCI ProTeam Solution Tech NIPPO Rali.

== Major results ==
2019
1st Stages 3 & 5 Vuelta a Colombia Juniors
2021
3rd Overall Tour de Savoie Mont-Blanc

1st Young rider classification
1st Stage 1

4th Overall Vuelta al Táchira

1st Young rider classification

4th Overall Tour Alsace

1st Stage 3

2023
5th Overall Vuelta de la Juventud de Colombia

1st Points classification

10th Overall Giro Next Gen
2024
7th Overall Tour of Qinghai Lake
2025
2nd Overall Giro della Regione Friuli Venezia Giulia

1st Points classification

4th Overall Tour Alsace
5th Overall Czech Tour
2026 (1 pro win)
1st Grand Prix Vorarlberg
1st Ordu Black Sea Classic
1st Stage 4 Tour of Magnificent Qinghai
2nd Overall Tour of Kahramanmaraş

1st Stage 3

2nd Trofeo Alcide Degasperi
3rd Overall Istrian Spring Tour
7th Overall Baku-Khankendi Azerbaijan Cycling Race
8th Giro dell'Appennino

=== Grand Tour general classification results timeline ===
Grand Tour	2024
Giro d'Italia	—
Tour de France	—
Vuelta a España	106

Legend
—	Did not compete
DNF	Did not finish
