= Jaume Guardeño =

Spanish cyclist (born 2003)

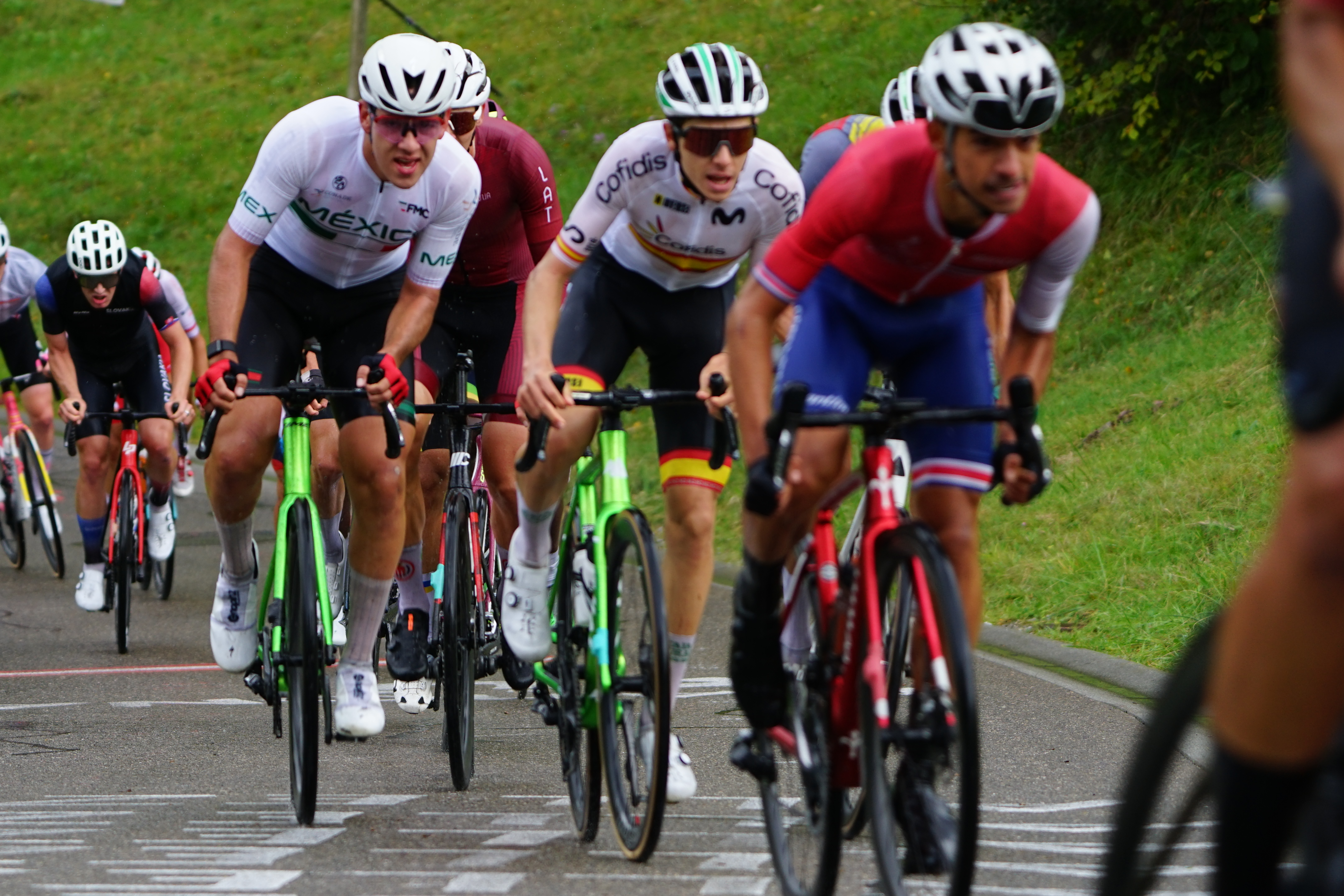
- Jaume Guardeño at the 2024 World Championships

Personal information
- Full name: Jaume Guardeño Roma
- Born: 20 February 2003 (age 23) Altea, Spain
- Height: 1.75 m (5 ft 9 in)
- Weight: 62 kg (137 lb)

Cycling career
- Sport: Cycling
- Current team: Caja Rural–Seguros RGA
- Discipline: Road
- Role: Rider
- Rider type: Climber

Amateur teams
- 2020: InfinObras–Zafiro
- 2021: Bathco Cycling Team
- 2022–2023: Caja Rural–Alea

Professional teams
- 2023: Caja Rural–Seguros RGA (stagiaire)
- 2024–: Caja Rural–Seguros RGA

Jaume Guardeño Roma (born 20 February 2003) is a Spanish cyclist, who currently rides for UCI ProTeam Caja Rural–Seguros RGA.

== Major results ==
2022
1st Sprints classification, Vuelta a Castellón
8th Overall Vuelta a La Coruña
2023
1st Overall Bidasoko Itzulia

1st Points classification

1st Young rider classification, Volta a Portugal
2nd Overall Vuelta a la Comunidad de Madrid

1st Points classification
1st Young rider classification
1st Stage 1 (TTT)

5th Overall Vuelta a Castellón
7th Gorlako Igoera
10th Tour de Basse-Navarre
2024
1st Young rider classification, Volta a Portugal
8th Overall Tour of Qinghai Lake
10th Overall Orlen Nations Grand Prix

=== Grand Tour general classification results timeline ===
Grand Tour	2025
Giro d'Italia	—
Tour de France	—
Vuelta a España	14
