= Jokin Murguialday =

Spanish cyclist (born 2000)

Personal information
- Full name: Jokin Murguialday Elorza
- Born: 19 March 2000 (age 26) Gamiz-Fika, Spain
- Height: 1.73 m (5 ft 8 in)
- Weight: 58 kg (128 lb)

Cycling career
- Sport: Cycling
- Current team: Euskaltel–Euskadi
- Discipline: Road
- Role: Rider

Amateur team
- 2019–2020: Caja Rural–Seguros RGA amateur

Professional teams
- 2021–2024: Caja Rural–Seguros RGA
- 2025–: Euskaltel–Euskadi

Jokin Murguialday Elorza (born 19 March 2000) is a Spanish cyclist, who currently rides for UCI ProTeam Euskaltel–Euskadi.

== Major results ==
2019
1st San Gregorio Saria
1st Premio de San Pedro de Irún
2020
National Under-23 Road Championships

2nd Road race
2nd Time trial

6th Overall Tour of Bulgaria
8th Overall Giro Ciclistico d'Italia
2021
3rd Overall Troféu Joaquim Agostinho

1st Young rider classification

2022
9th Overall Volta a Portugal em Bicicleta

1st Young rider classification

2023
7th Overall GP Beiras e Serra da Estrela
9th Overall Tour de Langkawi
2024
6th Overall Tour of Qinghai Lake
2026
7th Andorra MoraBanc Clàssica
