= 2024 Tour of Qinghai Lake =

Chinese cycling race

2024 UCI ProSeries

Race details
- Dates: 7–14 July 2024
- Stages: 8
- Distance: 1,193.3 km (741.5 mi)
- Winning time: 26h 58' 47"

Results
Jersey awarded to the overall winner	Winner	Jefferson Alveiro Cepeda (ECU)	(Caja Rural–Seguros RGA)
	Second	Guillermo Thomas Silva (URU)	(Caja Rural–Seguros RGA)
	Third	Manuele Tarozzi (ITA)	(VF Group–Bardiani–CSF–Faizanè)
Jersey awarded to the points classification winner	Points	Henok Mulubrhan (ERI)	(Astana Qazaqstan Team)
Jersey awarded to the mountains classification winner	Mountains	Mario Aparicio (ESP)	(Burgos BH)
	Team	(Spain) Caja Rural–Seguros RGA	

The 2024 Tour of Qinghai Lake was a road cycling stage race that took place between 7 and 14 July 2024 in China. The race was rated as a category 2.Pro event on the 2024 UCI ProSeries calendar, and was the 22nd edition of the Tour of Qinghai Lake.

== Teams ==
Two UCI WorldTeams, five UCI ProTeams, and fifteen UCI Continental teams made up the 22 teams that participated in the race.

UCI WorldTeams

- Alpecin–Deceuninck
- Astana Qazaqstan Team

UCI ProTeams

- Bingoal WB
- Burgos BH
- Caja Rural–Seguros RGA
- Team Corratec–Vini Fantini
- VF Group–Bardiani–CSF–Faizanè

UCI Continental Teams

- Bodywrap Men's Cycling Team
- China Glory–Mentech Continental Cycling Team
- Ferei Quick-Panda Podium Mongolia Team
- Hengxiang Cycling Team
- Huansheng–SCOM–Taishan Sport Cycling Team
- Li-Ning Star
- Maloja Pushbikers
- Mazowsze Serce Polski
- Parkhotel Valkenburg
- Roojai Insurance
- Spor Toto Cycling Team
- St George Continental Cycling Team
- Tarteletto–Isorex
- Team Medellín–EPM
- Tianyoude Hotel Cycling Team

== Route ==
Stage characteristics and winners
Stage	Date	Course	Distance	Type	Stage winner
1	7 July	Xining to Xining	120.6 km (74.9 mi)	Flat stage	Jensen Plowright (AUS)
2	8 July	Duoba to Huzhu	112.3 km (69.8 mi)	Hilly stage	Eric Fagúndez (URU)
3	9 July	Huzhu to Guide	202.4 km (125.8 mi)	Intermediate stage	Manuele Tarozzi (ITA)
4	10 July	Guide to Gonghe	136.1 km (84.6 mi)	Hilly stage	Mario Aparicio (ESP)
5	11 July	Gonghe to Xihaizhen	127.2 km (79.0 mi)	Hilly stage	Jensen Plowright (AUS)
6	12 July	Xihaizhen to Qilian	205.6 km (127.8 mi)	Hilly stage	Davide Persico (ITA)
7	13 July	Qilian to Menyuan	168.5 km (104.7 mi)	Hilly stage	Ahmet Örken (TUR)
8	14 July	Menyuan to Menyuan	120.6 km (74.9 mi)	Hilly stage	Eric Fagúndez (URU)
Total			1,193.3 km (741.5 mi)		

== Stages ==
=== Stage 1 ===
7 July 2024 — Xining to Xining, 120.6 km (74.9 mi)

Stage 1 Result
Rank	Rider	Team	Time
1	Jensen Plowright (AUS)	Alpecin–Deceuninck	2h 30' 52"
2	Enrico Zanoncello (ITA)	VF Group–Bardiani–CSF–Faizanè	+ 0"
3	Jesper Rasch (NED)	Parkhotel Valkenburg	+ 0"
4	Ramon Sinkeldam (NED)	Alpecin–Deceuninck	+ 0"
5	Tobiasz Pawlak (POL)	Mazowsze Serce Polski	+ 0"
6	Martin Laas (EST)	Ferei Quick-Panda Podium Mongolia Team	+ 0"
7	Luis Carlos Chia (COL)	Huansheng–SCOM–Taishan Sport Cycling Team	+ 0"
8	Reinardt Janse van Rensburg (RSA)	China Glory–Mentech Continental Cycling Team	+ 0"
9	Timothy Dupont (BEL)	Tarteletto–Isorex	+ 0"
10	Luca Colnaghi (ITA)	VF Group–Bardiani–CSF–Faizanè	+ 0"

General classification after Stage 1
Rank	Rider	Team	Time
1	Jensen Plowright (AUS)	Alpecin–Deceuninck	2h 30' 42"
2	Enrico Zanoncello (ITA)	VF Group–Bardiani–CSF–Faizanè	+ 4"
3	Luke Mudgway (NZL)	Li-Ning Star	+ 4"
4	Jesper Rasch (NED)	Parkhotel Valkenburg	+ 6"
5	Clément Alleno (FRA)	Burgos BH	+ 6"
6	Mathis Avondts (BEL)	Parkhotel Valkenburg	+ 7"
7	Jiancai Wang (CHN)	Tianyoude Hotel Cycling Team	+ 7"
8	Ethan Batt (NZL)	Hengxiang Cycling Team	+ 8"
9	Ramon Sinkeldam (NED)	Alpecin–Deceuninck	+ 10"
10	Tobiasz Pawlak (POL)	Mazowsze Serce Polski	+ 10"

=== Stage 2 ===
8 July 2024 — Duoba to Huzhu, 112.3 km (69.8 mi)

Stage 2 Result
Rank	Rider	Team	Time
1	Eric Fagúndez (URU)	Burgos BH	2h 37' 17"
2	Davide Baldaccini (ITA)	Team Corratec–Vini Fantini	+ 0"
3	Saeid Safarzadeh (IRN)	Tianyoude Hotel Cycling Team	+ 0"
4	Guillermo Thomas Silva (URU)	Caja Rural–Seguros RGA	+ 0"
5	Manuele Tarozzi (ITA)	VF Group–Bardiani–CSF–Faizanè	+ 0"
6	Ewout De Keyser (BEL)	Tarteletto–Isorex	+ 0"
7	Victor Ocampo (COL)	Team Medellín–EPM	+ 3"
8	Filippo Magli (ITA)	VF Group–Bardiani–CSF–Faizanè	+ 11"
9	Enrico Zanoncello (ITA)	VF Group–Bardiani–CSF–Faizanè	+ 11"
10	Reinardt Janse van Rensburg (RSA)	China Glory–Mentech Continental Cycling Team	+ 11"

General classification after Stage 2
Rank	Rider	Team	Time
1	Eric Fagúndez (URU)	Burgos BH	5h 07' 59"
2	Davide Baldaccini (ITA)	Team Corratec–Vini Fantini	+ 4"
3	Saeid Safarzadeh (IRN)	Tianyoude Hotel Cycling Team	+ 6"
4	Manuele Tarozzi (ITA)	VF Group–Bardiani–CSF–Faizanè	+ 10"
5	Ewout De Keyser (BEL)	Tarteletto–Isorex	+ 10"
6	Guillermo Thomas Silva (URU)	Caja Rural–Seguros RGA	+ 10"
7	Victor Ocampo (COL)	Team Medellín–EPM	+ 13"
8	Enrico Zanoncello (ITA)	VF Group–Bardiani–CSF–Faizanè	+ 15"
9	Clément Alleno (FRA)	Burgos BH	+ 17"
10	Henok Mulubrhan (ERI)	Astana Qazaqstan Team	+ 18"

=== Stage 3 ===
9 July 2024 — Huzhu to Guide, 202.4 km (125.8 mi)

Stage 3 Result
Rank	Rider	Team	Time
1	Manuele Tarozzi (ITA)	VF Group–Bardiani–CSF–Faizanè	4h 59' 12"
2	Henok Mulubrhan (ERI)	Astana Qazaqstan Team	+ 0"
3	Jefferson Alveiro Cepeda (ECU)	Caja Rural–Seguros RGA	+ 3"
4	Jokin Murguialday (ESP)	Caja Rural–Seguros RGA	+ 3"
5	Jaume Guardeño (ESP)	Caja Rural–Seguros RGA	+ 6"
6	Santiago Umba (COL)	Astana Qazaqstan Team	+ 31"
7	Wilmar Paredes (COL)	Team Medellín–EPM	+ 2' 02"
8	Luca Colnaghi (ITA)	VF Group–Bardiani–CSF–Faizanè	+ 2' 02"
9	Guillermo Thomas Silva (URU)	Caja Rural–Seguros RGA	+ 2' 02"
10	Witse Meeussen (BEL)	Alpecin–Deceuninck	+ 2' 02"

General classification after Stage 3
Rank	Rider	Team	Time
1	Manuele Tarozzi (ITA)	VF Group–Bardiani–CSF–Faizanè	10h 07' 11"
2	Henok Mulubrhan (ERI)	Astana Qazaqstan Team	+ 12"
3	Jefferson Alveiro Cepeda (ECU)	Caja Rural–Seguros RGA	+ 20"
4	Jokin Murguialday (ESP)	Caja Rural–Seguros RGA	+ 24"
5	Jaume Guardeño (ESP)	Caja Rural–Seguros RGA	+ 27"
6	Santiago Umba (COL)	Astana Qazaqstan Team	+ 48"
7	Eric Fagúndez (URU)	Burgos BH	+ 2' 02"
8	Davide Baldaccini (ITA)	Team Corratec–Vini Fantini	+ 2' 06"
9	Saeid Safarzadeh (IRN)	Tianyoude Hotel Cycling Team	+ 2' 08"
10	Ewout De Keyser (BEL)	Tarteletto–Isorex	+ 2' 12"

=== Stage 4 ===
10 July 2024 — Guide to Gonghe, 136.1 km (84.6 mi)

Stage 4 Result
Rank	Rider	Team	Time
1	Mario Aparicio (ESP)	Burgos BH	3h 28' 31"
2	Adne van Engelen (NED)	Roojai Insurance	+ 0"
3	Guillermo Thomas Silva (URU)	Caja Rural–Seguros RGA	+ 2"
4	Jefferson Alveiro Cepeda (ECU)	Caja Rural–Seguros RGA	+ 2"
5	Henok Mulubrhan (ERI)	Astana Qazaqstan Team	+ 2' 39"
6	Yonathan Monsalve (COL)	Tianyoude Hotel Cycling Team	+ 2' 39"
7	Wilmar Paredes (COL)	Team Medellín–EPM	+ 2' 39"
8	Lorenzo Quartucci (ITA)	Team Corratec–Vini Fantini	+ 2' 39"
9	Jambaljamts Sainbayar (MGL)	Burgos BH	+ 2' 39"
10	Rodrigo Álvarez (ESP)	Burgos BH	+ 2' 39"

General classification after Stage 4
Rank	Rider	Team	Time
1	Jefferson Alveiro Cepeda (ECU)	Caja Rural–Seguros RGA	13h 36' 01"
2	Guillermo Thomas Silva (URU)	Caja Rural–Seguros RGA	+ 1' 50"
3	Mario Aparicio (ESP)	Burgos BH	+ 1' 52"
4	Manuele Tarozzi (ITA)	VF Group–Bardiani–CSF–Faizanè	+ 2' 20"
5	Henok Mulubrhan (ERI)	Astana Qazaqstan Team	+ 2' 29"
6	Jokin Murguialday (ESP)	Caja Rural–Seguros RGA	+ 2' 44"
7	Jaume Guardeño (ESP)	Caja Rural–Seguros RGA	+ 2' 47"
8	Santiago Umba (COL)	Astana Qazaqstan Team	+ 3' 08"
9	Eric Fagúndez (URU)	Burgos BH	+ 4' 22"
10	Davide Baldaccini (ITA)	Team Corratec–Vini Fantini	+ 4' 26"

=== Stage 5 ===
11 July 2024 — Gonghe to Xihaizhen, 127.2 km (79.0 mi)

Stage 5 Result
Rank	Rider	Team	Time
1	Jensen Plowright (AUS)	Alpecin–Deceuninck	2h 58' 46"
2	Davide Persico (ITA)	Bingoal WB	+ 0"
3	Alexander Salby (DEN)	Bingoal WB	+ 0"
4	Norbert Banaszek (POL)	Mazowsze Serce Polski	+ 0"
5	Reinardt Janse van Rensburg (RSA)	China Glory–Mentech Continental Cycling Team	+ 0"
6	Timothy Dupont (BEL)	Tarteletto–Isorex	+ 0"
7	Guillermo Thomas Silva (URU)	Caja Rural–Seguros RGA	+ 0"
8	Georgios Bouglas (GRE)	Burgos BH	+ 0"
9	Kenneth Van Rooy (BEL)	Bingoal WB	+ 0"
10	Ramon Sinkeldam (NED)	Alpecin–Deceuninck	+ 0"

General classification after Stage 5
Rank	Rider	Team	Time
1	Jefferson Alveiro Cepeda (ECU)	Caja Rural–Seguros RGA	16h 34' 47"
2	Guillermo Thomas Silva (URU)	Caja Rural–Seguros RGA	+ 1' 48"
3	Mario Aparicio (ESP)	Burgos BH	+ 1' 52"
4	Manuele Tarozzi (ITA)	VF Group–Bardiani–CSF–Faizanè	+ 2' 20"
5	Henok Mulubrhan (ERI)	Astana Qazaqstan Team	+ 2' 26"
6	Jokin Murguialday (ESP)	Caja Rural–Seguros RGA	+ 2' 44"
7	Jaume Guardeño (ESP)	Caja Rural–Seguros RGA	+ 2' 47"
8	Santiago Umba (COL)	Astana Qazaqstan Team	+ 3' 05"
9	Eric Fagúndez (URU)	Burgos BH	+ 4' 22"
10	Davide Baldaccini (ITA)	Team Corratec–Vini Fantini	+ 4' 26"

=== Stage 6 ===
12 July 2024 — Xihaizhen to Qilian, 205.6 km (127.8 mi)

Stage 6 Result
Rank	Rider	Team	Time
1	Davide Persico (ITA)	Bingoal WB	4h 23' 09"
2	Enrico Zanoncello (ITA)	VF Group–Bardiani–CSF–Faizanè	+ 0"
3	Guillermo Thomas Silva (URU)	Caja Rural–Seguros RGA	+ 0"
4	Norbert Banaszek (POL)	Mazowsze Serce Polski	+ 0"
5	Henok Mulubrhan (ERI)	Astana Qazaqstan Team	+ 0"
6	Kenneth Van Rooy (BEL)	Bingoal WB	+ 0"
7	Willie Smit (RSA)	China Glory–Mentech Continental Cycling Team	+ 0"
8	Matias Malmberg (DEN)	Maloja Pushbikers	+ 0"
9	Eric Fagúndez (URU)	Burgos BH	+ 0"
10	Senne Leysen (BEL)	Alpecin–Deceuninck	+ 0"

General classification after Stage 6
Rank	Rider	Team	Time
1	Jefferson Alveiro Cepeda (ECU)	Caja Rural–Seguros RGA	20h 57' 56"
2	Guillermo Thomas Silva (URU)	Caja Rural–Seguros RGA	+ 1' 44"
3	Manuele Tarozzi (ITA)	VF Group–Bardiani–CSF–Faizanè	+ 2' 20"
4	Henok Mulubrhan (ERI)	Astana Qazaqstan Team	+ 2' 26"
5	Mario Aparicio (ESP)	Burgos BH	+ 2' 31"
6	Jokin Murguialday (ESP)	Caja Rural–Seguros RGA	+ 2' 44"
7	Santiago Umba (COL)	Astana Qazaqstan Team	+ 3' 05"
8	Jaume Guardeño (ESP)	Caja Rural–Seguros RGA	+ 3' 26"
9	Eric Fagúndez (URU)	Burgos BH	+ 4' 21"
10	Saeid Safarzadeh (IRN)	Tianyoude Hotel Cycling Team	+ 4' 28"

=== Stage 7 ===
13 July 2024 — Qilian to Menyuan, 168.5 km (104.7 mi)

Stage 7 Result
Rank	Rider	Team	Time
1	Ahmet Örken (TUR)	Spor Toto Cycling Team	3h 32' 44"
2	Tegshbayar Batsaikhan (MGL)	Roojai Insurance	+ 0"
3	Martijn Rasenberg (NED)	Parkhotel Valkenburg	+ 0"
4	Riccardo Lucca (ITA)	VF Group–Bardiani–CSF–Faizanè	+ 0"
5	Valentin Darbellay (SUI)	Team Corratec–Vini Fantini	+ 0"
6	Alexandre Balmer (SUI)	Team Corratec–Vini Fantini	+ 0"
7	Ide Schelling (NED)	Astana Qazaqstan Team	+ 0"
8	Yonathan Monsalve (VEN)	Tianyoude Hotel Cycling Team	+ 0"
9	Jakub Kaczmarek (POL)	Mazowsze Serce Polski	+ 0"
10	Gianni Marchand (BEL)	Tarteletto–Isorex	+ 0"

General classification after Stage 7
Rank	Rider	Team	Time
1	Jefferson Alveiro Cepeda (ECU)	Caja Rural–Seguros RGA	24h 30' 52"
2	Guillermo Thomas Silva (URU)	Caja Rural–Seguros RGA	+ 1' 44"
3	Manuele Tarozzi (ITA)	VF Group–Bardiani–CSF–Faizanè	+ 2' 20"
4	Henok Mulubrhan (ERI)	Astana Qazaqstan Team	+ 2' 26"
5	Mario Aparicio (ESP)	Burgos BH	+ 2' 31"
6	Jokin Murguialday (ESP)	Caja Rural–Seguros RGA	+ 2' 44"
7	Santiago Umba (COL)	Astana Qazaqstan Team	+ 3' 05"
8	Jaume Guardeño (ESP)	Caja Rural–Seguros RGA	+ 3' 26"
9	Ander Okamika (ESP)	Burgos BH	+ 4' 20"
10	Eric Fagúndez (URU)	Burgos BH	+ 4' 21"

=== Stage 8 ===
14 July 2024 — Menyuan to Menyuan, 120.6 km (74.9 mi)

Stage 8 Result
Rank	Rider	Team	Time
1	Eric Fagúndez (URU)	Burgos BH	2h 27' 41"
2	Marcin Budziński (POL)	Mazowsze Serce Polski	+ 1"
3	Rodrigo Álvarez (ESP)	Burgos BH	+ 1"
4	Guillermo Thomas Silva (URU)	Caja Rural–Seguros RGA	+ 1"
5	Filippo Magli (ITA)	VF Group–Bardiani–CSF–Faizanè	+ 1"
6	Henok Mulubrhan (ERI)	Astana Qazaqstan Team	+ 1"
7	Willie Smit (RSA)	China Glory–Mentech Continental Cycling Team	+ 1"
8	Josh Kench (NZL)	Tianyoude Hotel Cycling Team	+ 1"
9	Valentin Darbellay (SUI)	Team Corratec–Vini Fantini	+ 1"
10	Javier Ernesto Jamaica (COL)	Team Medellín–EPM	+ 1"

General classification after Stage 8
Rank	Rider	Team	Time
1	Jefferson Alveiro Cepeda (ECU)	Caja Rural–Seguros RGA	26h 58' 47"
2	Guillermo Thomas Silva (URU)	Caja Rural–Seguros RGA	+ 1' 31"
3	Manuele Tarozzi (ITA)	VF Group–Bardiani–CSF–Faizanè	+ 2' 07"
4	Henok Mulubrhan (ERI)	Astana Qazaqstan Team	+ 2' 11"
5	Mario Aparicio (ESP)	Burgos BH	+ 2' 18"
6	Jokin Murguialday (ESP)	Caja Rural–Seguros RGA	+ 2' 31"
7	Santiago Umba (COL)	Astana Qazaqstan Team	+ 2' 52"
8	Jaume Guardeño (ESP)	Caja Rural–Seguros RGA	+ 3' 13"
9	Eric Fagúndez (URU)	Burgos BH	+ 3' 54"
10	Ander Okamika (ESP)	Burgos BH	+ 4' 07"

== Classification leadership table ==
Classification leadership by stage
Stage	Winner	General classification	Points classification	Mountains classification	Team classification
1	Jensen Plowright	Jensen Plowright	Jensen Plowright	Jiancai Wang	VF Group–Bardiani–CSF–Faizanè
2	Eric Fagúndez	Eric Fagúndez	Enrico Zanoncello	Mario Aparicio	VF Group–Bardiani–CSF–Faizanè
3	Manuele Tarozzi	Manuele Tarozzi	Manuele Tarozzi	Henok Mulubrhan	Caja Rural–Seguros RGA
4	Mario Aparicio	Jefferson Alveiro Cepeda	Henok Mulubrhan	Mario Aparicio	Caja Rural–Seguros RGA
5	Jensen Plowright	Jefferson Alveiro Cepeda	Henok Mulubrhan	Mario Aparicio	Caja Rural–Seguros RGA
6	Davide Persico	Jefferson Alveiro Cepeda	Henok Mulubrhan	Mario Aparicio	Caja Rural–Seguros RGA
7	Ahmet Örken	Jefferson Alveiro Cepeda	Henok Mulubrhan	Mario Aparicio	Caja Rural–Seguros RGA
8	Eric Fagúndez	Jefferson Alveiro Cepeda	Henok Mulubrhan	Mario Aparicio	Caja Rural–Seguros RGA
Final		Jefferson Alveiro Cepeda	Henok Mulubrhan	Mario Aparicio	Caja Rural–Seguros RGA

== Classification standings ==
Legend
Denotes the leader of the general classification
Denotes the leader of the points classification
Denotes the leader of the mountains classification

=== General classification ===
Final general classification (1–10)
Rank	Rider	Team	Time
1	Jefferson Alveiro Cepeda (ECU)	Caja Rural–Seguros RGA	26h 58' 47"
2	Guillermo Thomas Silva (URU)	Caja Rural–Seguros RGA	+ 1' 31"
3	Manuele Tarozzi (ITA)	VF Group–Bardiani–CSF–Faizanè	+ 2' 07"
4	Henok Mulubrhan (ERI)	Astana Qazaqstan Team	+ 2' 11"
4	Mario Aparicio (ESP)	Burgos BH	+ 2' 18"
6	Jokin Murguialday (ESP)	Caja Rural–Seguros RGA	+ 2' 31"
7	Santiago Umba (COL)	Astana Qazaqstan Team	+ 2' 52"
8	Jaume Guardeño (ESP)	Caja Rural–Seguros RGA	+ 3' 13"
9	Eric Fagúndez (URU)	Burgos BH	+ 3' 54"
10	Ander Okamika (ESP)	Burgos BH	+ 4' 07"

=== Points classification ===
Final points classification (1–10)
Rank	Rider	Team	Points
1	Henok Mulubrhan (ERI)	Astana Qazaqstan Team	71
2	Guillermo Thomas Silva (URU)	Caja Rural–Seguros RGA	70
3	Eric Fagúndez (URU)	Burgos BH	45
4	Jensen Plowright (AUS)	Alpecin–Deceuninck	39
5	Enrico Zanoncello (ITA)	VF Group–Bardiani–CSF–Faizanè	36
6	Yonathan Monsalve (VEN)	Tianyoude Hotel Cycling Team	35
7	Jefferson Alveiro Cepeda (ECU)	Caja Rural–Seguros RGA	34
8	Davide Persico (ITA)	Bingoal WB	32
9	Luke Mudgway (NZL)	Li-Ning Star	30
10	Ander Okamika (ESP)	Burgos BH	29

=== Mountains classification ===
Final mountains classification (1–10)
Rank	Rider	Team	Points
1	Mario Aparicio (ESP)	Burgos BH	23
2	Henok Mulubrhan (ERI)	Astana Qazaqstan Team	20
3	Jefferson Alveiro Cepeda (ECU)	Caja Rural–Seguros RGA	13
4	Adne van Engelen (NED)	Roojai Insurance	11
5	Nils Sinschek (NED)	Parkhotel Valkenburg	10
6	Clément Alleno (FRA)	Burgos BH	8
7	Ander Okamika (ESP)	Burgos BH	7
8	Lucas De Rossi (FRA)	China Glory–Mentech Continental Cycling Team	7
9	Jaume Guardeño (ESP)	Caja Rural–Seguros RGA	7
10	Jelle Vermoote (BEL)	Bingoal WB	7

=== Team classification ===
Final team classification (1–10)
Rank	Team	Time
1	(Spain) Caja Rural–Seguros RGA	80h 58' 32"
2	(Spain) Burgos BH	+ 8' 55"
3	(Kazakhstan) Astana Qazaqstan Team	+ 11' 46"
4	(Italy) Team Corratec–Vini Fantini	+ 13' 54"
5	(Italy) VF Group–Bardiani–CSF–Faizanè	+ 16' 22"
6	(Colombia) Team Medellín–EPM	+ 17' 53"
7	(China) Tianyoude Hotel Cycling Team	+ 27' 41"
8	(Belgium) Alpecin–Deceuninck	+ 44' 49"
9	(Belgium) Bingoal WB	+ 59' 05"
10	China Glory–Mentech Continental Cycling Team	+ 1h 19' 48"
