= Jensen Plowright =

Australian cyclist (born 2000)

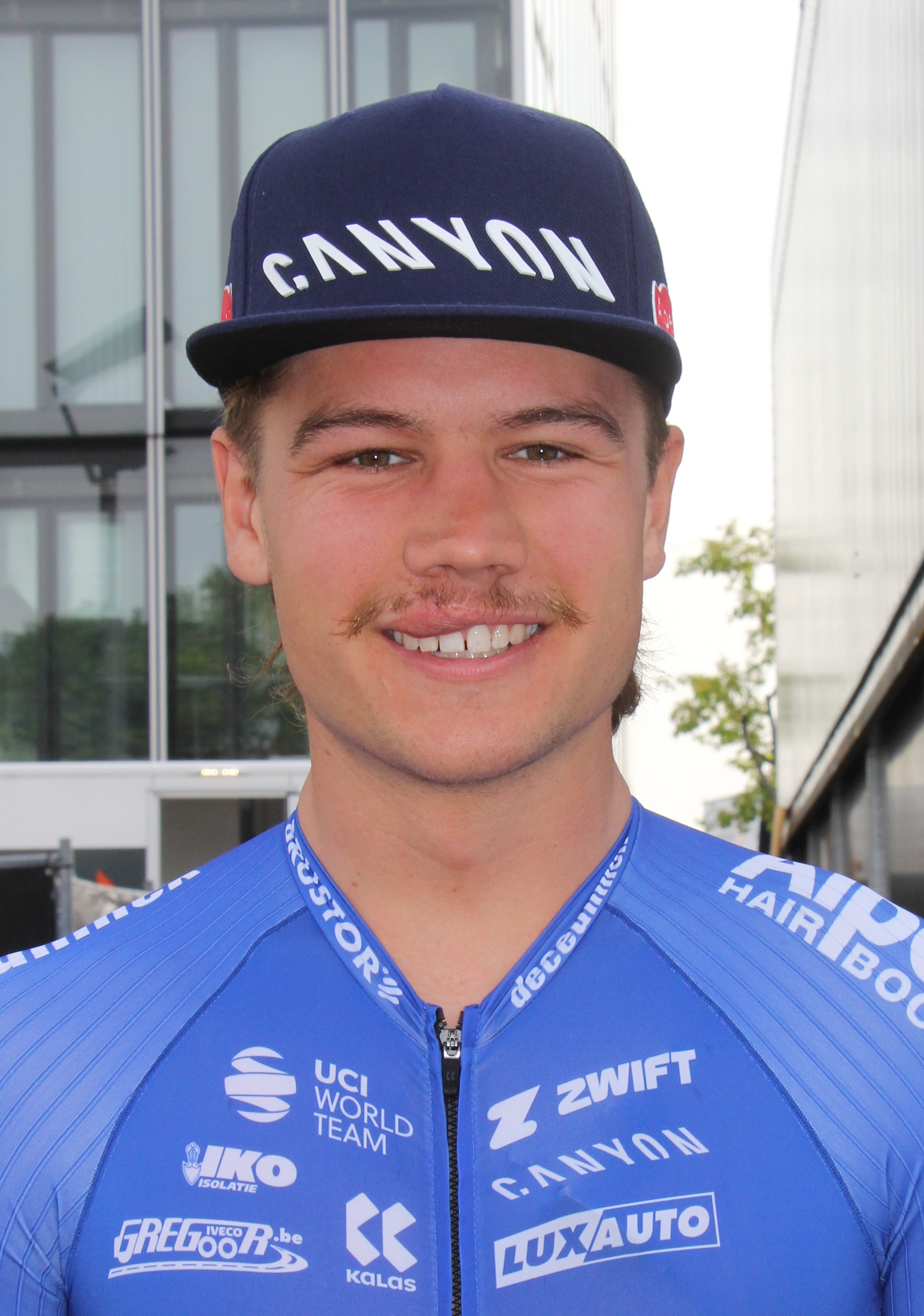
- Plowright at the 2023 Rund um Köln

Personal information
- Full name: Jensen Plowright
- Nicknames: Plow, The Plow, Mr Plow, Le Plow
- Born: 15 May 2000 (age 26) Melbourne, Australia
- Height: 1.76 m (5 ft 9 in)
- Weight: 80 kg (176 lb)

Cycling career
- Sport: Cycling
- Current team: Alpecin–Premier Tech
- Discipline: Road
- Role: Rider
- Rider type: Sprinter

Amateur team
- 2018: Total Rush

Professional teams
- 2019: Drapac Cannondale Holistic Development Team
- 2020–2021: Team BridgeLane
- 2022: Équipe Continentale Groupama–FDJ
- 2023–: Alpecin–Deceuninck

Jensen Plowright (born 15 May 2000) is an Australian professional racing cyclist, who currently rides for UCI WorldTeam Alpecin–Premier Tech.

== Major results ==
2017
3rd Road race, National Junior Road Championships
2018
1st Stage 1 Tour of the King Valley
2019
1st Stage 3 New Zealand Cycle Classic
1st Stage 1 Tour of Southland
1st Stage 1 Tour of Tasmania
2020
1st Stage 3 New Zealand Cycle Classic
2021
1st Melbourne to Warrnambool Classic
4th Overall A Travers les Hauts de France
2022
1st Youngster Coast Challenge
1st Stage 2 Le Triptyque des Monts et Châteaux
1st Stage 3b Flanders Tomorrow Tour
4th Dorpenomloop Rucphen
9th Grote Prijs Jean-Pierre Monseré
2023
5th Gullegem Koerse
7th Omloop van het Houtland
2024 (2 pro wins)
Tour of Qinghai Lake

1st Stages 1 & 5

2nd Criterium, National Road Championships
6th Grand Prix de Fourmies
8th Grand Prix Criquielion
9th Grand Prix d'Isbergues
2025
1st Omloop van het Waasland
7th Grand Prix d'Isbergues
8th Paris–Chauny
2026
1st National Criterium Championships

=== Grand Tour general classification results timeline ===
Grand Tour	2025	2026
Giro d'Italia	158	130
Tour de France	—	
Vuelta a España	—	

Legend
—	Did not compete
DNF	Did not finish
IP	Race in Progress
