= Marco Manenti =

Italian bicycle racer

Personal information
- Born: 7 September 2002 (age 24) Treviglio, Italy
- Height: 1.84 m (6 ft 0 in)

Cycling career
- Sport: Cycling
- Current team: Bardiani–CSF 7 Saber
- Discipline: Road
- Role: Rider

Amateur teams
- 2019: Ciclistica Trevigliese
- 2020: Massi Supermercati
- 2021: Velo Plus Racing Team Palazzago
- 2022: Solme–Olmo
- 2023–2025: Hopplà–Petroli Firenze–Don Camillo

Professional team
- 2026–: Bardiani–CSF 7 Saber

Marco Manenti (born 7 September 2002) is an Italian cyclist, who currently rides for UCI ProTeam Bardiani–CSF 7 Saber.

== Major results ==
2025
1st Stage 1 Giro della Regione Friuli Venezia Giulia
2026 (1 pro win)
1st Stage 4 Baku-Khankendi Azerbaijan Cycling Race
1st Due Giorni Marchigiana - Trofeo Città di Castelfidardo
2nd Rhodes GP
5th Road race, National Road Championships
