= Stan Van Tricht =

Belgian cyclist

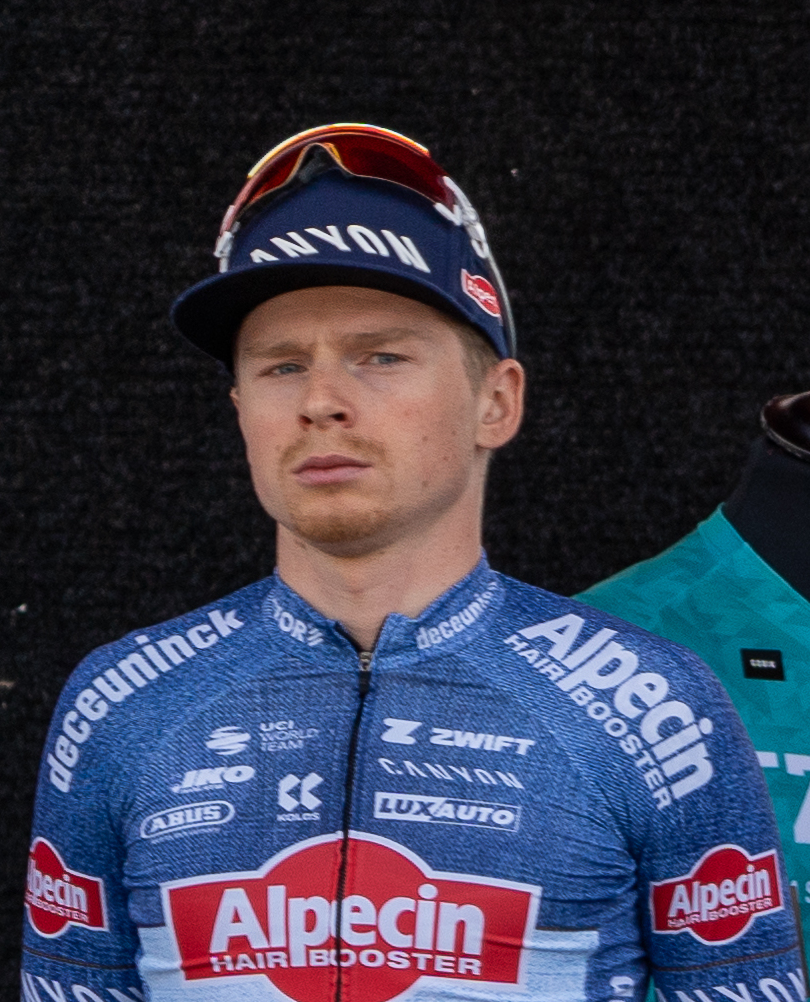
- Van Tricht at the 2024 Tour of the Basque Country

Personal information
- Born: 20 September 1999 (age 27) Leuven, Belgium
- Height: 1.74 m (5 ft 9 in)
- Weight: 64 kg (141 lb)

Cycling career
- Sport: Cycling
- Current team: Alpecin–Premier Tech
- Discipline: Road
- Role: Rider

Amateur teams
- 2008–2016: Lotto Olympia Tienen
- 2017: Fort Young CT
- 2018: VL Technics-Experza-Abutriek
- 2019: GM Recycling

Professional teams
- 2020–2021: SEG Racing Academy
- 2021: Deceuninck–Quick-Step (stagiaire)
- 2022–2023: Quick-Step Alpha Vinyl Team
- 2024–: Alpecin–Deceuninck

Major wins
- One-day Races and Classics Coppa Bernocchi (2024)

Stan Van Tricht (born 20 September 1999) is a Belgian cyclist, who currently rides for UCI WorldTeam Alpecin–Premier Tech.

While riding as a stagiaire for Deceuninck–Quick-Step, he won the 2021 Gullegem Koerse.

His younger brother Floris is also a professional cyclist.

== Major results ==
2016
8th Grand Prix Bob Jungels
2017
2nd Overall Keizer der Juniores
4th Overall Oberosterreich Juniorenrundfahrt
2019
3rd Overall Olympia's Tour

1st Stage 2

10th Liège–Bastogne–Liège U23
10th Ronde van Vlaanderen Beloften
2020
1st Stage 3 Arden Challenge
2021
1st Gullegem Koerse
1st Circuit de Valkenswaard
2nd Coppa della Pace
3rd Overall International Tour of Rhodes

1st Young rider classification

3rd International Rhodes Grand Prix
7th Ronde van Limburg
7th Circuit de Wallonie
2022
4th Dwars door het Hageland
9th Tour of Leuven
2023
2nd Dwars door het Hageland
2nd Tour of Leuven
2024 (1 pro win)
1st Coppa Bernocchi
10th Druivenkoers Overijse
2025
8th Antwerp Port Epic
