= Joaquín Sobrino =

Spanish cyclist

Personal information
- Full name: Joaquín Sobrino Martínez
- Born: 22 June 1982 (age 44) Posada de Llanes, Spain

Cycling career
- Sport: Cycling
- Current team: Retired
- Discipline: Road
- Role: Rider

Amateur team
- 2003–2006: Super Froiz

Professional teams
- 2007: Relax–GAM
- 2008–2009: Burgos Monumental
- 2010–2011: Caja Rural
- 2012–2013: SP Tableware
- 2014: Differdange–Losch
- 2015–2016: Inteja–MMR Dominican Cycling Team

Joaquín Sobrino Martínez (born 22 June 1982 in Posada de Llanes) is a Spanish former professional cyclist, who rode professionally between 2007 and 2016.

== Major results ==
2005
Tour of Galicia

1st Stages 3 & 5

2008
1st Stage 2 Vuelta a Navarra
1st Stage 2 Vuelta Mexico Telmex
10th Circuito de Getxo
2009
1st Stage 1 Vuelta a Castilla y León
5th Circuito de Getxo
10th Trofeo Cala Millor
2010
1st Stage 3a Vuelta a Asturias
10th Circuito de Getxo
2011
5th Flèche d'Emeraude
7th Châteauroux Classic
2012
3rd Overall Tour d'Algérie

1st Points classification
1st Stage 2

5th Overall Okolo Jižních Čech

1st Stage 3

10th Circuit d'Alger
2013
1st Stage 4 Five Rings of Moscow
7th Overall Tour d'Algérie
7th Grand Prix of Moscow
9th Mayor Cup
2014
4th Ronde van Midden-Nederland
