= David Vitoria =

Spanish cyclist

Personal information
- Full name: David Vitoria
- Born: October 15, 1984 (age 42) Locarno, Switzerland

Cycling career
- Sport: Cycling
- Current team: Retired
- Discipline: Road
- Role: Rider

Amateur teams
- 2004–2005: VC Mendrisio–PL Valli
- 2008: Universidad Politécnica de Valencia Bancaja

Professional teams
- 2006: Phonak
- 2007: BMC Racing Team
- 2009: Rock Racing
- 2010: Footon–Servetto–Fuji

David Vitoria is a Swiss former professional road cyclist. He resides in the town Albacete by Ossa de Montiel and was a training partner of fellow professional cyclist Óscar Sevilla.

He turned professional at the age of 22 with the Swiss team Phonak. Later he joined the still modest BMC Racing Team. In 2008 he raced as an amateur (with the Universidad Politécnica de Valencia Bancaja) but returned in 2009 with Rock Racing alongside Óscar Sevilla.

For the season 2010 the UCI ProTour team Footon–Servetto–Fuji signed him thus taking the leap into the professional class. He retired in 2011.

== Major results ==
2005
6th Giro del Mendrisiotto
7th Neuseen Classics
10th Giro del Lago Maggiore
2007
3rd Time trial, Swiss National Road Championships
8th Lancaster Classic
2009
3rd Overall Vuelta Mexico

1st Stages 4 & 5

5th Philadelphia International Championship
8th Vuelta a La Rioja
9th Kampioenschap van Vlaanderen
2010
8th Philadelphia International Championship
