= Eric Fagúndez =

Uruguayan road racing cyclist

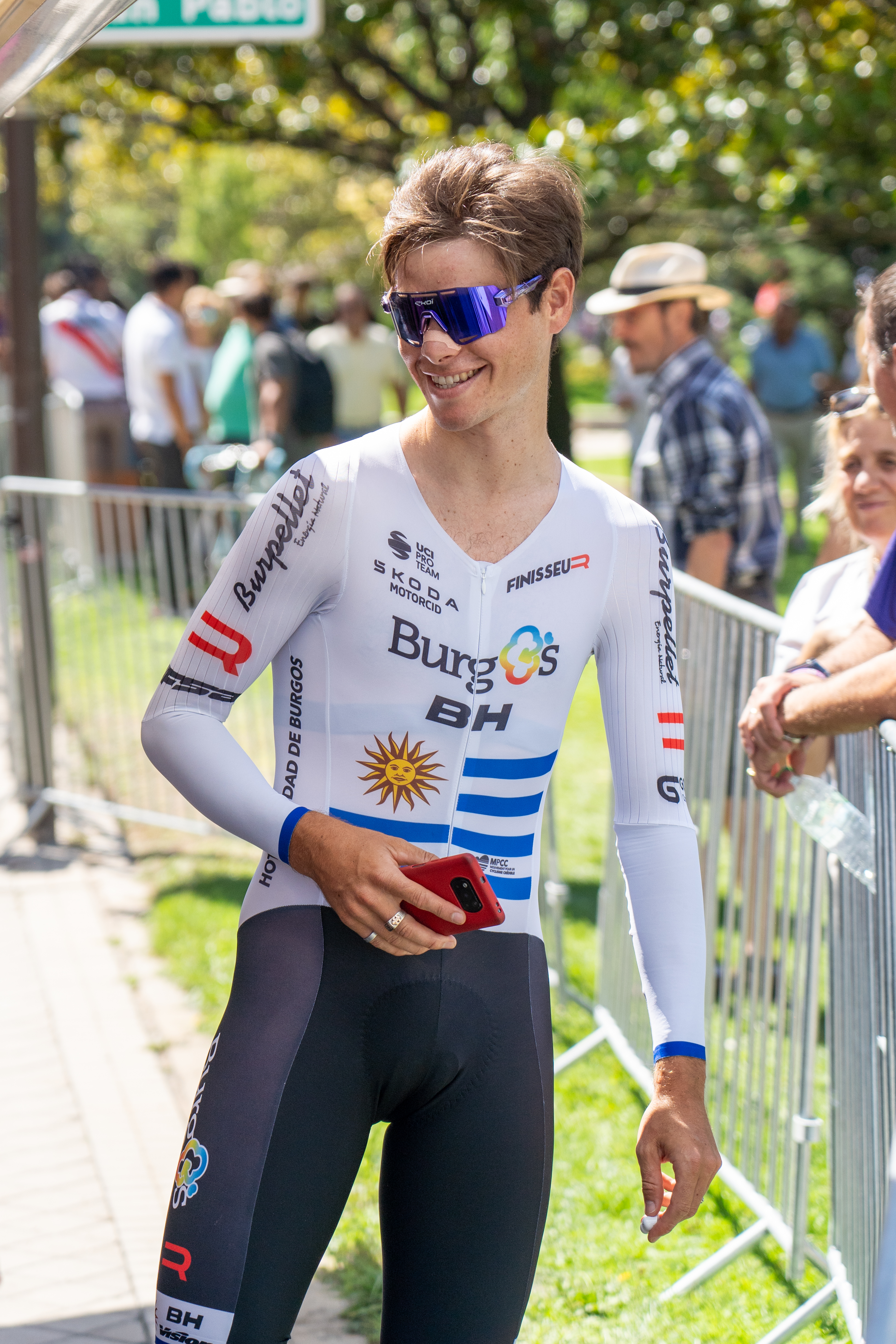
- Fagúndez at the 2023 Vuelta a España

Personal information
- Full name: Antonio Eric Fagúndez Lima
- Born: 19 August 1998 (age 28) Vergara, Uruguay
- Height: 1.8 m (5 ft 11 in)
- Weight: 67 kg (148 lb)

Cycling career
- Sport: Cycling
- Current team: Burgos Burpellet BH
- Discipline: Road
- Role: Rider
- Rider type: Time trialist

Amateur teams
- 2017: Nacional de Melo
- 2018–2019: Centro Uruguay de Vergara
- 2019–2020: Baque–Ideus–BH Team
- 2020–2021: Union 33 de Vergara
- 2021–2022: Aluminios Cortizo

Professional teams
- 2022: BAI–Sicasal–Petro de Luanda (stagiaire)
- 2023–: Burgos BH

Major wins
- One-day races and Classics National Time Trial Championships (2023, 2025)
Medal record
Men's road bicycle racing
Representing Uruguay
Pan American Games
Bronze medal – third place	2023 Santiago	Road race

Antonio Eric Fagúndez Lima (born 19 August 1998) is a Uruguayan cyclist, who currently rides for UCI ProTeam Burgos Burpellet BH.

== Major results ==
2018
1st Time trial, National Under-23 Road Championships
1st Stage 4 Rutas de América
4th Time trial, Pan American Under-23 Road Championships
2022
1st Overall Vuelta a Zamora
1st Clásica de Pascua
2nd Overall Vuelta a Segovia

1st Stage 2

2023 (1 pro win)
National Road Championships

1st Time trial
5th Road race

2nd Overall Tour of Qinghai Lake
Pan American Games

3rd Road race
4th Time trial

Pan American Road Championships

4th Road race
5th Time trial

6th Overall GP Beiras e Serra da Estrela

1st Stage 1 (TTT)

Combativity award Stage 5 Vuelta a España
2024 (2)
2nd Time trial, National Road Championships
3rd Overall Vuelta a Asturias
4th Tour du Doubs
9th Overall Tour of Qinghai Lake

1st Stages 2 & 8

2025 (1)
National Road Championships

1st Time trial
2nd Road race

2nd Gran Premio Castellón
4th Giro del Veneto
5th Overall O Gran Camiño
5th Time trial, Pan American Road Championships
6th Clásica Jaén Paraíso Interior
8th Veneto Classic
2026 (1)
1st Giro di Campania
Pan American Road Championships

3rd Time trial
10th Road race

4th Overall Tour of Magnificent Qinghai
4th Overall Baku-Khankendi Azerbaijan Cycling Race
4th Visit South Aegean GP
5th Overall Route d'Occitanie
9th Overall GP Beiras e Serra da Estrela

=== Grand Tour general classification results timeline ===
Grand Tour	2023	2024	2025	2026
Giro d'Italia	—	—	—	—
Tour de France	—	—	—	—
Vuelta a España	129	—	DNF	

Legend
—	Did not compete
DNF	Did not finish
