= Mario Aparicio =

Spanish cyclist (born 2000)

Personal information
- Full name: Mario Aparicio Muñoz
- Born: 23 April 2000 (age 26) Aranda de Duero, Spain
- Height: 1.85 m (6 ft 1 in)
- Weight: 68 kg (150 lb)

Cycling career
- Sport: Cycling
- Current team: Burgos Burpellet BH
- Discipline: Road
- Role: Rider

Amateur teams
- 2017–2018: MMR Academy
- 2019–2020: Gomur–Cantabria Infinita

Professional team
- 2021–: Burgos BH

Mario Aparicio Muñoz (born 23 April 2000) is a Spanish cyclist, who currently rides for UCI ProTeam Burgos Burpellet BH.

== Major results ==
2017
1st Stage 3 Vuelta al Besaya
3rd Road race, National Junior Road Championships
2023
1st Stage 1 (TTT) GP Beiras e Serra da Estrela
6th Overall Tour of Qinghai Lake
2024 (1 pro win)
1st Stage 4 Tour of Sharjah
5th Overall Tour of Qinghai Lake

1st Mountains classification
1st Stage 4

6th Overall International Tour of Hellas
8th Overall Tour of Turkey
Tour de Langkawi

1st Mountains classification

2025
1st Stage 1 Tour of Sharjah
