= Alexandre Balmer =

Swiss cyclist (born 2000)

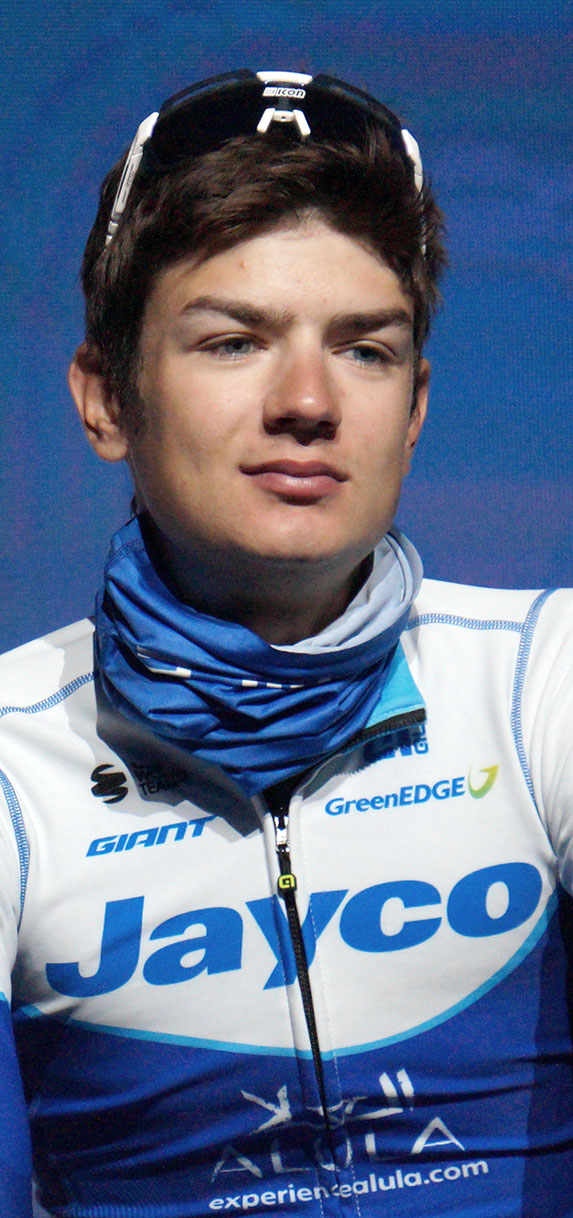
- Balmer in 2023

Personal information
- Born: 4 May 2000 (age 26) La Chaux-de-Fonds, Switzerland
- Height: 1.91 m (6 ft 3 in)
- Weight: 70 kg (154 lb)

Cycling career
- Sport: Cycling
- Current team: Solution Tech NIPPO Rali
- Disciplines: Cross-country; Road
- Role: Rider

Amateur team
- 2017: Talent Romandie

Professional teams
- 2020–2021: Équipe Continentale Groupama–FDJ
- 2022–2023: Team BikeExchange–Jayco
- 2024–: Team Corratec–Vini Fantini
Medal record
Representing Switzerland
Men's mountain bike racing
World Championships
Gold medal – first place	2018 Lenzerheide	Team relay
Bronze medal – third place	2020 Leogang	Team relay

Alexandre Balmer (born 4 May 2000) is a Swiss cross-country and road racing cyclist, who currently rides for UCI ProTeam Solution Tech NIPPO Rali. He participated at the 2018 UCI Mountain Bike World Championships, winning a gold medal in the team relay.

== Major results ==
=== Road ===
2017
National Junior Championships

1st Time trial
3rd Road race

3rd La Classique des Alpes Juniors
7th Overall Tour du Pays de Vaud
2018
National Junior Championships

1st Time trial
1st Road race

1st Overall Driedaagse van Axel
2nd Road race, UEC European Junior Championships
2nd Trofeo Buffoni
4th Road race, UCI World Junior Championships
4th Overall Tour du Pays de Vaud
2019
5th Time trial, National Under-23 Championships
2020
1st Time trial, National Under-23 Championships
2021
3rd Giro del Belvedere
8th Overall Giro della Valle d'Aosta
8th Time trial, UEC European Under-23 Championships
9th Overall Alpes Isère Tour

1st Young rider classification

2022
9th Maryland Cycling Classic
9th Giro del Veneto
2023
8th Maryland Cycling Classic
2024
3rd GP Kranj
6th Cupa Max Ausnit
2025
2nd Trofeo Città di Brescia
3rd Radsportfest Märwil
8th Overall Tour of Sharjah
2026
2nd Grand Prix Vorarlberg
2nd Giro della Provincia di Biella
3rd Overall Tour of Istanbul
3rd Overall Baku-Khankendi Azerbaijan Cycling Race
3rd Gran Premio Colli Rovescalesi
5th Giro dell'Appennino
8th Ordu Black Sea Classic
10th Ordu Coast to Summit

=== Mountain bike ===
2017
2nd Cross-country, UCI European Junior Championships
2018
UCI World Championships

1st Team relay
1st Junior Cross-country

1st Cross-country, UCI European Junior Championships
2020
UCI Under-23 XCO World Cup

2nd Nové Město I

3rd Team relay, UCI World Championships
