= 2024 Coppa Bernocchi =

- 2024 UCI ProSeries

Race details
- Dates: 7 October 2024
- Stages: 1
- Distance: 174.34 km (108.3 mi)
- Winning time: 3h 50' 10"

Results
	Winner	Stan Van Tricht (BEL)	(Alpecin–Deceuninck)
	Second	Alex Baudin (FRA)	(Decathlon–AG2R La Mondiale)
	Third	Roger Adrià (ESP)	(Red Bull–Bora–Hansgrohe)

The 2024 Coppa Bernocchi (also known as the Coppa Bernocchi – GP Banco BPM for sponsorship reasons) was the 105th edition of the Coppa Bernocchi road cycling one day race, which was held in and around Legnano, Italy, on 7 October 2024.

== Teams ==
14 UCI WorldTeams, nine UCI ProTeams, and one UCI Continental team make up the 24 teams that participated in the race.

UCI WorldTeams

- Alpecin–Deceuninck
- Arkéa–B&B Hotels
- Astana Qazaqstan Team
- Cofidis
- Decathlon–AG2R La Mondiale
- EF Education–EasyPost
- Intermarché–Wanty
- Lidl–Trek
- Movistar Team
- Red Bull–Bora–Hansgrohe
- Soudal–Quick-Step
- Team Jayco–AlUla
- UAE Team Emirates
- Visma–Lease a Bike

UCI ProTeams

- Euskaltel–Euskadi
- Israel–Premier Tech
- Lotto–Dstny
- Polti–Kometa
- Q36.5 Pro Cycling Team
- Team Corratec–Vini Fantini
- Team TotalEnergies
- Tudor Pro Cycling Team
- VF Group–Bardiani–CSF–Faizanè

UCI Continental Teams

- Biesse–Carrera

== Results ==
Result
Rank	Rider	Team	Time
1	Stan Van Tricht (BEL)	Alpecin–Deceuninck	3h 50' 10"
2	Alex Baudin (FRA)	Decathlon–AG2R La Mondiale	+ 0"
3	Roger Adrià (ESP)	Red Bull–Bora–Hansgrohe	+ 0"
4	Neilson Powless (USA)	EF Education–EasyPost	+ 0"
5	Bart Lemmen (NED)	Visma–Lease a Bike	+ 0"
6	Pavel Sivakov (FRA)	UAE Team Emirates	+ 3"
7	Alessandro Pinarello (ITA)	VF Group–Bardiani–CSF–Faizanè	+ 5"
8	Dorian Godon (FRA)	Decathlon–AG2R La Mondiale	+ 1' 27"
9	Francesco Busatto (ITA)	Intermarché–Wanty	+ 1' 27"
10	Marijn van den Berg (NED)	EF Education–EasyPost	+ 1' 27"
