= Beistegui Hermanos =

Spanish bicycle manufacturer

Beistegui Hermanos S.A.
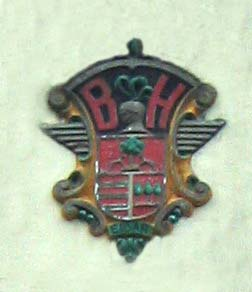
- Traded as: BH
- Founded: 1909 in Éibar, Spain
- Founders: Cosme Beistegui, Domingo Beistegui, Juan Beistegui
- Headquarters: Vitoria-Gasteiz, Basque Country (Spain)
- Number of locations: Vitoria-Gasteiz: 2 Águeda, Portugal: 1
- Area served: Europe
- Products: Bicycles

Beistegui Hermanos S.A. (BH or BH Bikes) is a Spanish bicycle manufacturer. Founded in 1909, it is headquartered in Spain. As of 2023 it also went by BH Bicycles, after its years as Beistegui Hermanos.

== Company history ==
=== 1909-1958 ===
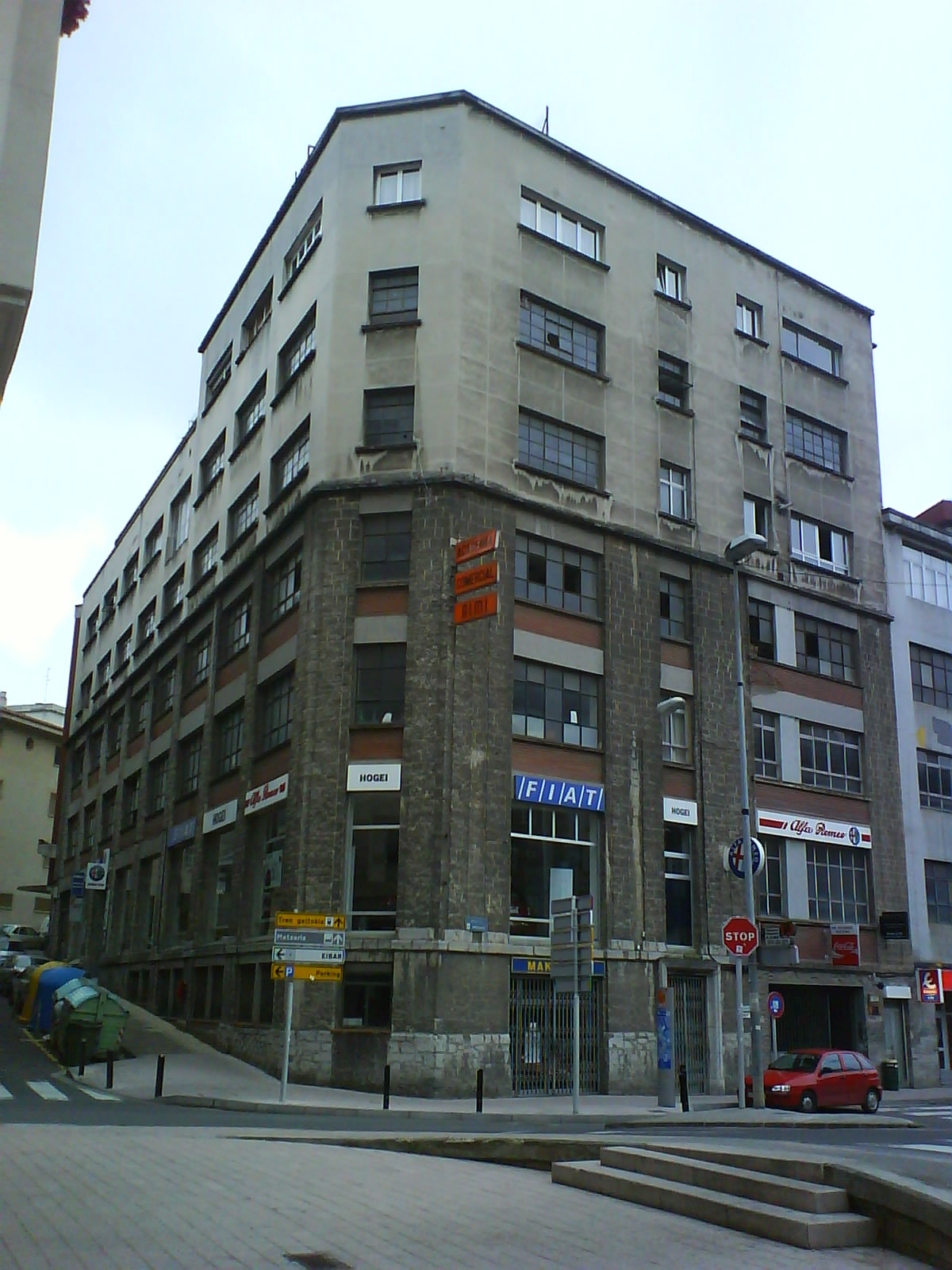
Facade of an older BH building in Eibar, before the headquarters moved to Vitoria

BH Bikes, or BH, is the acronym for Beistegui Hermanos, a company founded in Spain by the brothers Cosme Beistegui, Domingo Beistegui and Juan Beistegui. These individuals founded the company in 1909 in the Gipuzkoan municipality of Éibar, just before the onset of World War I. The company initially manufactured Mauser pistols, but orders slowed under the armistice.

The company chose to convert their production chain and begin the manufacturing of bicycles in 1919. Prior to the Spanish Civil War in 1936 until 1939, Beistegui Hermanos also produced firearms, specifically copies of the Ruby pistol (as the 1914 Model) and Mauser C96 (as the MM31 and MM34).

=== 1959-2009 ===
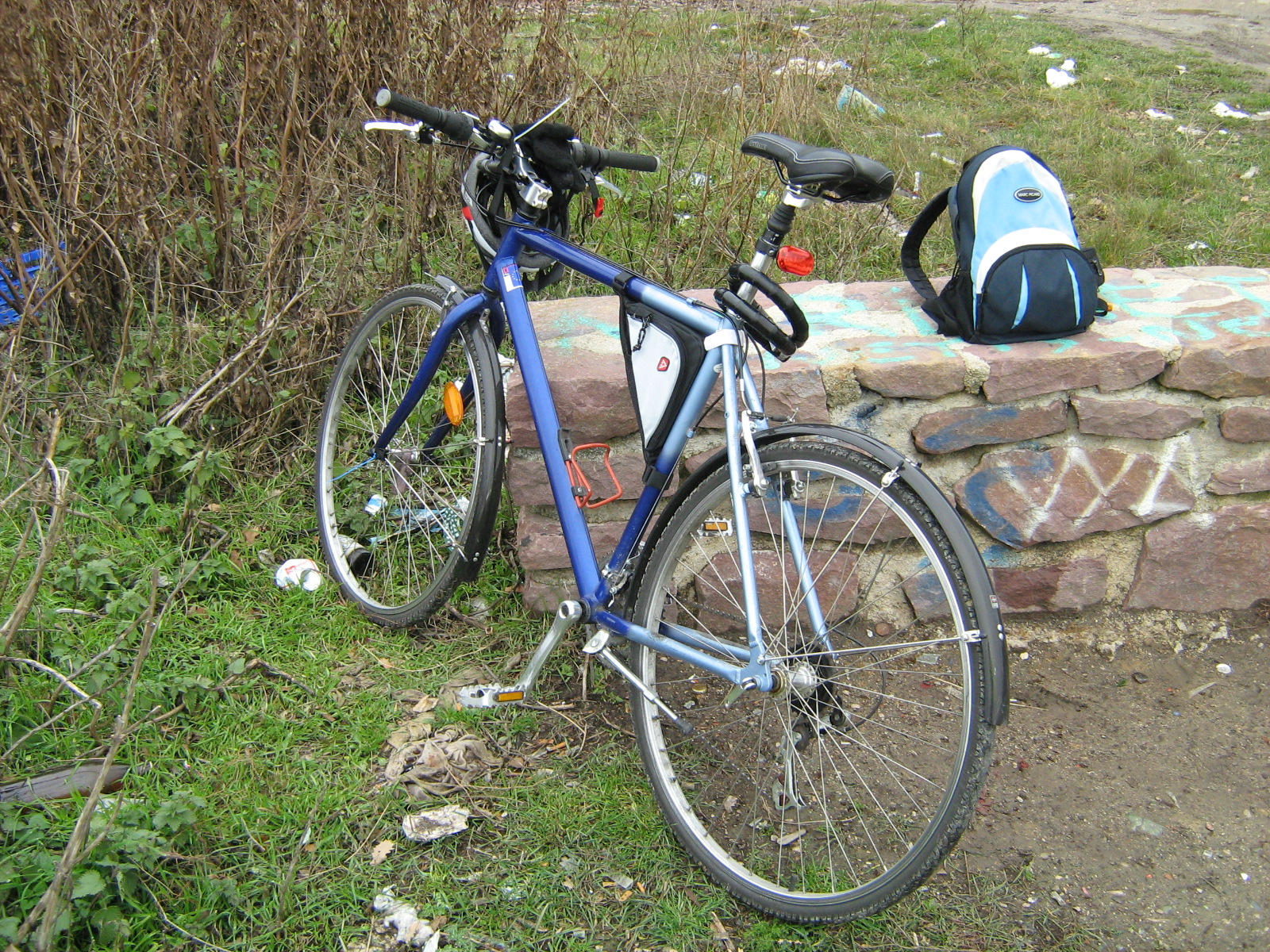
BH bike model London, with some added parts

In 1959, BH moved its production to a newer and larger plant in the Spanish city of Vitoria, capital of the Basque Country, Spain. In the decades afterwards, the Beistegui brothers' company became the largest producer of bicycles in Spain. Among well-known models were the touring bicycle BH Gacela, as well as a folding BH that could be folded into the boot of a car.

During the 1960s, the main BH factory in Vitoria manufactured not just frames, but everything from saddle to spokes and handlebar. BH expanded to have two manufacturing and assembly facilities in Vitoria and another one in Águeda, Portugal. The facilities include CNC laser machining, which also produces fitness equipment and parts for BMW and Mercedes-Benz.

Their BH Meteor model, a BMX bike, became popular in the 1980s. In 1984, the BH Running Bull became the first mountain bike manufactured entirely in Spain. Afterwards the company released its BH Top Line bike line, with oversize aluminum frames. Later lines included ultralight bicycles for triathlon use, and electronic bikes.

In the early 1990s, BH purchased Peugeot and founded Cycleurope, owner of Bianchi, Peugeot and Gitane. In 1996, BH sold Cycleurope to concentrate on home markets of Spain and in Portugal. In 2001, BH re-focused on the pan-European market.

=== 2010- 2024 ===
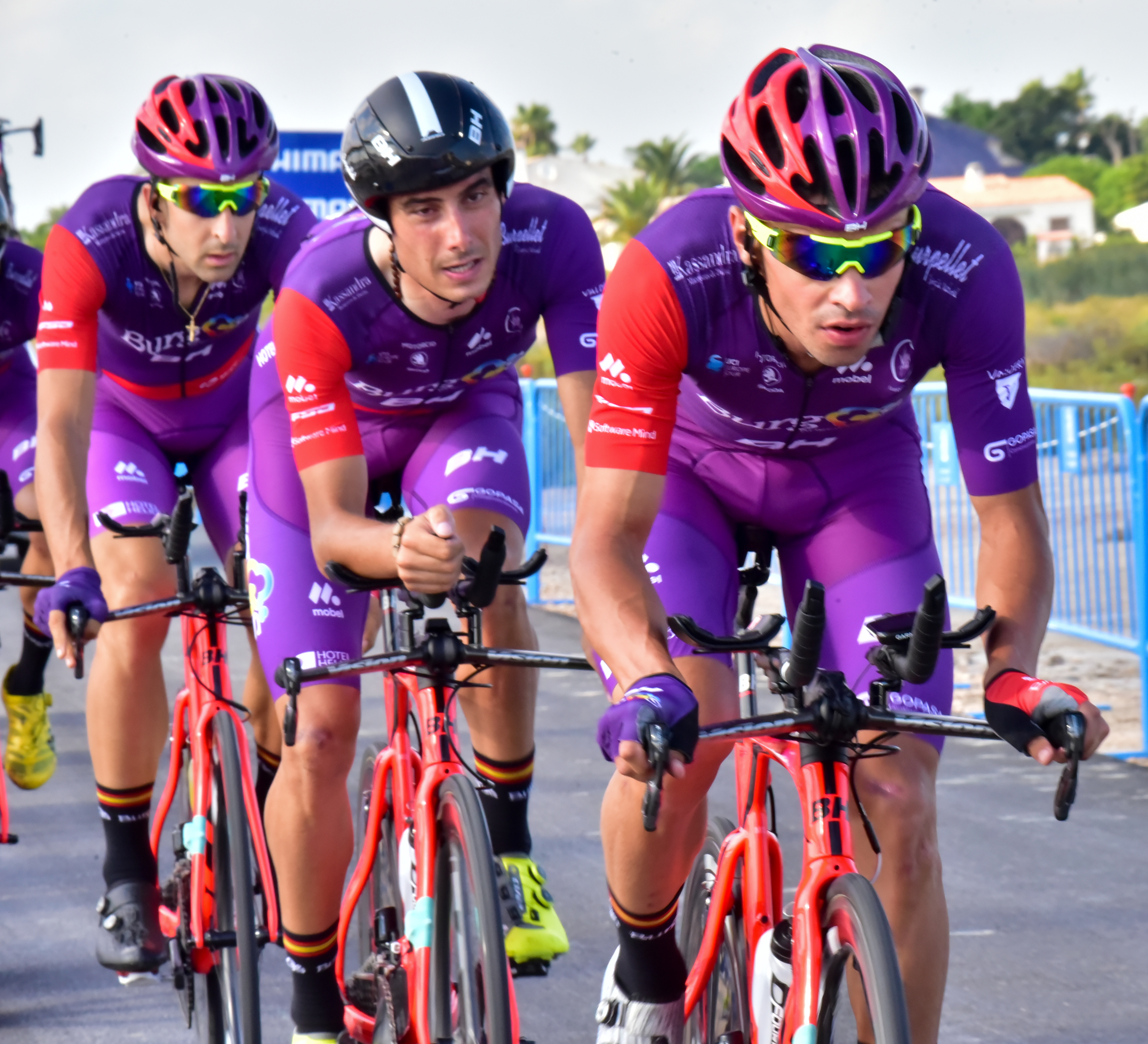
Cycling team Burgos BH on BH-branded tour bikes and wearing BH livery in 2019 La Vuelta race.

The Vitoria factory closed in 2010, with the company maintaining logistics there. Production was moved to Portugal and subcontracted to chaisn in China. BH Bikes remained owned by the Beistegui family.

The company introduced its first electric model in 2008. In 2016, the company sold around 60 different models that ranged in price from around $1,300 to US$5,200. BH at one point manufactured 200,000 bicycles a year, 50% of which were exported to European countries other than Spain.

As BH Bikes, in early 2021, the company was returning to the UK market with a partnership with the company Ciclista. Its bike range at that time include MTB, road, gravel, trekking, urban, and the various equivalents in e-bikes. BH Bikes already had partnerships with SPIUK and ProCycleCare. In 2022, BH was the third-largest bike-maker in Spain, after Orbea and Mondraker. As of 2023 it also went by BH Bicycles.

== Sponsorships and races ==
In 1935, the company sponsored the first Vuelta a España. The winner of the first two editions of this bike race, Gustaaf Deloor of Belgium, crossed the finish line on a BH bicycle. This was again the case later in 1986, with the rider Álvaro Pino, also on a BH.

BH sponsored the French Direct Énergie Pro Cycling Team in the 2016 and 2017 seasons, and have also sponsored the French cycling teams FDJ–Suez and Sojasun. Sponsored athletes have included Anton Sintsov and Donato De Ieso among others.

As BH Bikes, they were sponsoring the Spanish Burgos BH cycling team as of 2023.

== See also ==
- List of electric bicycle brands and manufacturers
- List of bicycle brands and manufacturing companies
- Outline of cycling
- Beistegui
- List of ETA attacks#2005
