= Burgos Burpellet BH =

Spanish cycling team

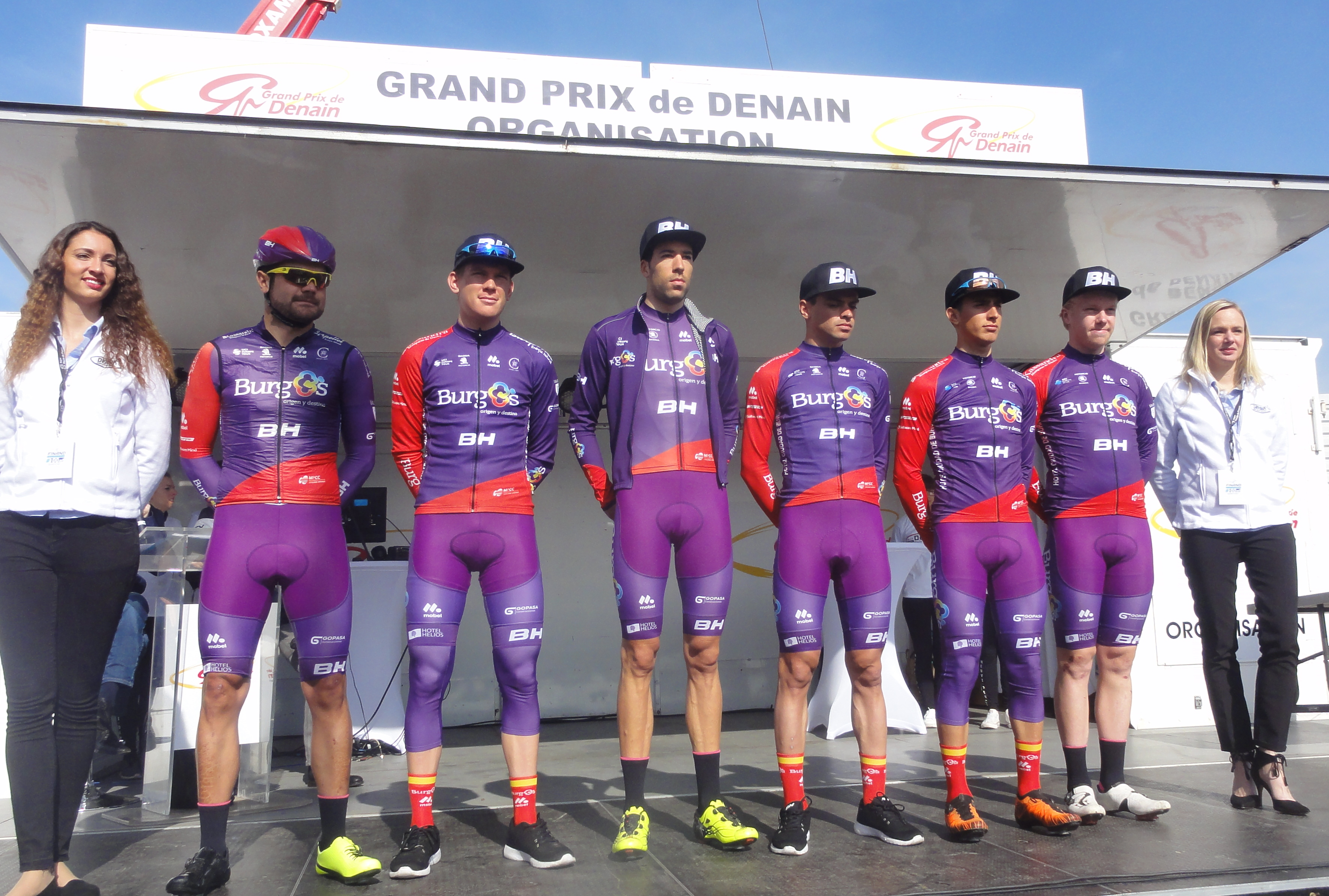
- The team in 2019

Team information
- UCI code: BBH
- Registered: Spain
- Founded: 2006
- Discipline: Road
- Status: UCI Continental (2006–2017); UCI Professional Continental/UCI ProTeam (2018–)
- Bicycles: BH

Key personnel
- Team manager: Julio Izquierdo

Team name history
- 2006–2007 2008 2009 2010–2011 2012–2013 2014–2024 2025–: Viña Magna–Cropu; Burgos Monumental; Burgos Monumental–Castilla y León; Burgos 2016–Castilla y León; Burgos BH–Castilla y Leon; Burgos BH; Burgos Burpellet BH

Burgos Burpellet BH (UCI team code: BBH) is a UCI ProTeam cycling team based in Burgos, Spain. The team was founded in 2006 under the name of "Viña Magna-Cropu".

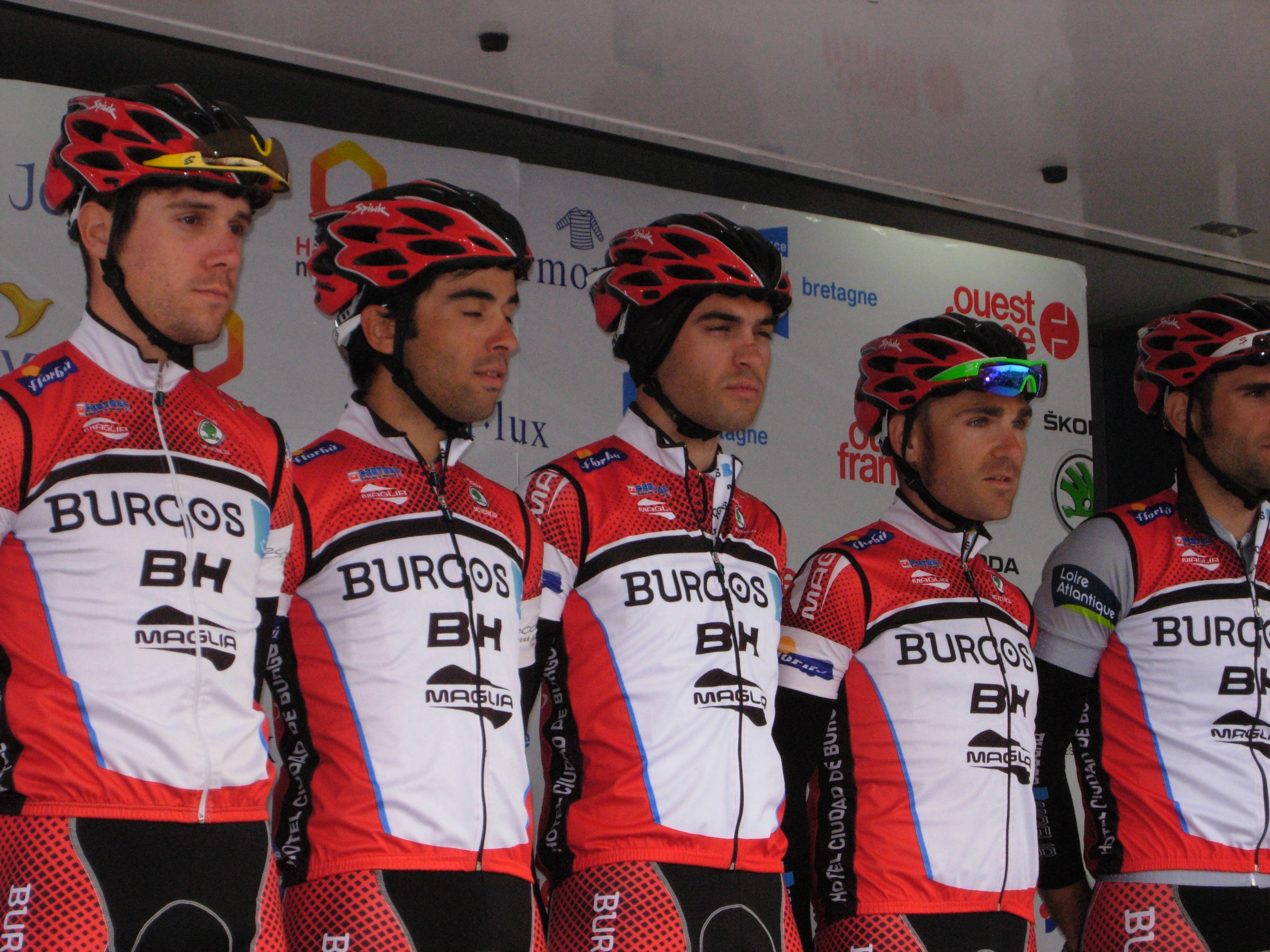
The team in 2013

== Doping ==
In December 2017, David Belda was given a four-year ban after testing positive for EPO. In July 2018, Igor Merino tested positive for growth hormone in a sample taken during June. In November 2018, Ibai Salas was handed a four-year doping ban for violations of the biological passport programme. As a result of this third anti-doping violation in the past 12 months, the team faces a potential suspension ranging between 15 and 45 days.

== Team roster ==
As of 2 January 2025.

Rider	Date of birth
Clément Alleno (FRA)	8 October 2000 (age 25)
Rodrigo Álvarez (ESP)	24 August 1999 (age 27)
Antonio Angulo (ESP)	18 February 1994 (age 32)
Mario Aparicio (ESP)	23 April 2000 (age 26)
Georgios Bouglas (GRE)	17 November 1990 (age 35)
Josh Burnett (NZL)	26 October 2000 (age 25)
Daniel Cavia (ESP)	2 June 2002 (age 24)
Sergio Chumil (GUA)	8 October 2000 (age 25)
Hugo de la Calle (ESP)	12 July 2004 (age 22)
David Delgado (ESP)	13 July 2000 (age 26)
José Manuel Díaz (ESP)	18 January 1995 (age 31)
Eric Fagúndez (URU)	19 August 1998 (age 28)

Rider	Date of birth
José Luis Faura (ESP)	15 September 2000 (age 25)
Sinuhé Fernández (ESP)	15 June 2000 (age 26)
Ángel Fuentes (ESP)	5 November 1996 (age 29)
Carlos García Pierna (ESP)	23 July 1999 (age 27)
George Jackson (NZL)	20 February 2000 (age 26)
Vojtěch Kmínek (CZE)	11 September 2000 (age 25)
Tomoya Koyama (JPN)	18 July 1998 (age 28)
Merhawi Kudus (ERI)	23 January 1994 (age 32)
David Martín (ESP)	19 February 1999 (age 27)
Alexandre Mayer (Note: Joined on 19 June.) (MRI)	29 April 1998 (age 28)
Ander Okamika (ESP)	2 April 1993 (age 33)
Jambaljamts Sainbayar (MGL)	4 September 1996 (age 30)

== Major wins ==
2006
Stage 4 Vuelta a la Comunidad de Madrid, Óscar Grau
Overall Vuelta a Navarra, Jesús Tendero
Stage 1 Vuelta a Asturias, Óscar Grau
Grand Prix Cristal Energie, Carlos Torrent
Stage 2 Vuelta a Burgos, Carlos Torrent
Stage 10 Tour de l'Avenir, Sergio Pardilla
2007
Stage 1 Vuelta a Cuba, Victor Gomes
Stages 3 & 6 Vuelta a Cuba, Bruno Lima
Stage 5 Cinturón a Mallorca, Diego Gallego
Stage 2 Vuelta Ciclista a León, Victor Gomes
Stage 4 Vuelta Ciclista a León, Carlos Torrent
Overall Tour des Pyrénées, Sergio Pardilla

Stage 2, Ivan Gilmartín
Stage 3, Sergio Pardilla

2008
Stage 3 Vuelta a La Rioja, Sergio Pardilla
Stage 2 Vuelta a Navarra, Joaquín Sobrino
Stage 2 Vuelta Mexico Telmex, Joaquín Sobrino
2009
Stage 1 Vuelta a Castilla y León, Joaquín Sobrino
2011
Stage 2 Mi-Août Bretonne, David Belda
2012
Stage 4 Vuelta Ciclista a León, Moisés Dueñas
2013
Stage 2 Tour des Pays de Savoie, Jesús del Pino
2014
Overall Vuelta a Castilla y León, David Belda

Stage 2, David Belda

Stage 3 Tour de Korea, Juan José Oroz
Stages 3 & 5 Volta a Portugal, David Belda
2015
Stage 4 Rhône-Alpes Isère Tour, David Belda
Overall Tour des Pays de Savoie, David Belda

Stage 1, David Belda

2017
Overall Tour de Gironde, Pablo Torres

Stage 2, Pablo Torres

2018
Stage 12 Tour of Qinghai Lake, Daniel López
2019
Stage 3 Troféu Joaquim Agostinho, José Fernandes
Stage 13 Tour of Qinghai Lake, Matthew Gibson
Stage 5 Vuelta a España, Ángel Madrazo
2022
Estonia National Road Race Championships, Mihkel Räim
Stage 8 Volta a Portugal, Victor Langellotti
Stage 8 Tour de Langkawi, Alex Molenaar
2023
Stage 5 La Tropicale Amissa Bongo, Miguel Ángel Fernández
Uruguay National Time Trial Championship, Eric Fagúndez
Stage 3 Volta ao Alentejo, Cyril Barthe
Stage 3 Vuelta a Asturias, Pelayo Sánchez
Stage 1 (TTT) GP Beiras e Serra da Estrela (Note: The riders on the squad were Pelayo Sánchez, Eric Fagúndez, Ander Okamika, Daniel Navarro, Mario Aparicio, Óscar Pelegrí and Antonio Angulo)
Stage 2 Troféu Joaquim Agostinho, José Manuel Díaz
Stage 6 Presidential Tour of Turkey, Victor Langellotti
2024
Stage 4 Tour of Sharjah, Mario Aparicio
New Zealand National Road Race Championship, Aaron Gate
Oceania Time Trial Championship, Aaron Gate
Mongolia National Time Trial Championship, Sainbayaryn Jambaljamts
Guatemala National Road Race Championship, Sergio Chumil
Stages 2 & 8 Tour of Qinghai Lake, Eric Fagúndez
Stage 4 Tour of Qinghai Lake, Mario Aparicio
Stage 3 Volta a Portugal, Sergio Chumil
Overall Trans-Himalaya Cycling Race, Aaron Gate
Overall Tour of Hainan, Aaron Gate

Stages 3 & 4, Aaron Gate

2025
Stage 1 Tour of Sharjah, Mario Aparicio
Uruguay National Time Trial Championship, Eric Fagúndez
Stage 4 O Gran Camiño, Sergio Chumil
2026
1st Clàssica Terres de l´Ebre, José Manuel Díaz

== National, continental and world champions ==
2022
Estonian Road Race, Mihkel Räim
2023
Uruguayan Time Trial, Eric Fagúndez
2024
New Zealand Road Race, Aaron Gate
Oceania Time Trial, Aaron Gate
Mongolia Time Trial, Sainbayaryn Jambaljamts
Guatemala Road Race, Sergio Chumil
2025
Uruguayan Time Trial, Eric Fagúndez
Mauritius Time Trial, Alexandre Mayer
Guatemala Time Trial, Sergio Chumil

== See also ==
- List of cycling teams in Spain
