= 2026 Tour of Taihu Lake =

2026 UCI Asia Tour

Race details
- Dates: 12–16 September 2026
- Stages: 5
- Distance: 588.4 km (365.6 mi)
- Winning time: 12h 05' 43"

Results
Jersey awarded to the overall winner	Winner	Matteo Malucelli (ITA)	(XDS Astana Team)
	Second	Joshua Giddings (GBR)	(Lotto–Intermarché)
	Third	Gleb Syritsa	(XDS Astana Team)
Jersey awarded to the points classification winner	Points	Matteo Malucelli (ITA)	(XDS Astana Team)
Jersey awarded to the young rider classification winner	Young rider	Joshua Giddings (GBR)	(Lotto–Intermarché)
	Team	(Spain) Euskaltel–Euskadi	

The 2026 Tour of Taihu Lake is a men's road cycling stage race which takes place from 12 to 16 September 2026. It is the 14th edition of the Tour of Taihu Lake, and is rated as a 2.1 event on the 2026 UCI Asia Tour calendar, after being in the ProSeries calendar for the previous 3 years.

== Teams ==
Two UCI WorldTeams, three UCI ProTeams, sixteen UCI Continental teams and one national team made up the twenty-two teams in the race.

UCI WorldTeams

- Lotto–Intermarché
- XDS Astana Team

UCI ProTeams

- Euskaltel–Euskadi
- Solution Tech NIPPO Rali
- Team Novo Nordisk

UCI Continental Teams

- Azerion / Villa Valkenburg
- CCACHE x BODYWRAP
- China Anta–Mentech Cycling Team
- Factor Racing
- Giant Cycling Team
- FNIX–SCOM–Hengxiang Cycling Team
- Huansheng–Vonoa–Taishan Sport Cycling Team
- Shenzhen Kung Cycling Team
- Li-Ning Star
- Qinghai Tianyoude Hotel Cycling Team
- Quick Pro Team
- Roojai Insurance Winspace
- Terengganu Cycling Team
- The Joyrun & Hurricane Cycling Team
- Van Rysel–Roubaix
- Wheeltop Rotor Chengdu Team

National Teams

- Hong Kong

== Schedule ==
Stage characteristics and winners
Stage	Date	Route	Distance	Type	Stage winner
1	12 September	Nanjing to Nanjing	96.5 km (60.0 mi)	Hilly stage	Joshua Giddings (GBR)
2	13 September	Changxing to Changxing	153.2 km (95.2 mi)	Flat stage	Matteo Malucelli (ITA)
3	14 September	Suzhou to Wujiang	122 km (76 mi)	Flat stage	Matteo Malucelli (ITA)
4	15 September	Qidong to Qidong	79.2 km (49.2 mi)	Flat stage	Matteo Malucelli (ITA)
5	16 September	Wuxi to Wuxi	137.5 km (85.4 mi)	Flat stage	Joes Oosterlinck (BEL)
Total			588.4 km (365.6 mi)		

== Stages ==
=== Stage 1 ===
12 September 2026 – Nanjing to Nanjing, 96.5 km (60.0 mi)

Stage 1 Result
Rank	Rider	Team	Time
1	Joshua Giddings (GBR)	Lotto–Intermarché	2h 08' 11"
2	Matteo Malucelli (ITA)	XDS Astana Team	+ 0"
3	Cameron Scott (AUS)	Li-Ning Star	+ 0"
4	Dušan Rajović (SRB)	Solution Tech NIPPO Rali	+ 0"
5	Gleb Syritsa	XDS Astana Team	+ 0"
6	Hodei Muñoz (ESP)	Euskaltel–Euskadi	+ 0"
7	Luke Mudgway (NZL)	Li-Ning Star	+ 0"
8	Paul Hennequin (FRA)	Euskaltel–Euskadi	+ 0"
9	Alexander Konychev (ITA)	China Anta–Mentech Cycling Team	+ 0"
10	Luke Verburg (NED)	Azerion / Villa Valkenburg	+ 0"

General classification after Stage 1
Rank	Rider	Team	Time
1	Joshua Giddings (GBR)	Lotto–Intermarché	2h 07' 58"
2	Matteo Malucelli (ITA)	XDS Astana Team	+ 7"
3	Cameron Scott (AUS)	Li-Ning Star	+ 9"
4	Su Haoyu (CHN)	XDS Astana Team	+ 10"
5	Luke Mudgway (NZL)	Li-Ning Star	+ 11"
6	Lucas De Rossi (FRA)	China Anta–Mentech Cycling Team	+ 11"
7	Alexander Konychev (ITA)	China Anta–Mentech Cycling Team	+ 12"
8	Matthew Fox (AUS)	Lotto–Intermarché	+ 12"
9	Dušan Rajović (SRB)	Solution Tech NIPPO Rali	+ 13"
10	Gleb Syritsa	XDS Astana Team	+ 13"

=== Stage 2 ===
13 September 2026 – Changxing to Changxing, 153.2 km (95.2 mi)

Stage 2 Result
Rank	Rider	Team	Time
1	Matteo Malucelli (ITA)	XDS Astana Team	3h 08' 10"
2	Alexander Salby (DEN)	Li-Ning Star	+ 0"
3	Gleb Syritsa	XDS Astana Team	+ 0"
4	Dušan Rajović (SRB)	Solution Tech NIPPO Rali	+ 0"
5	Joshua Giddings (GBR)	Lotto–Intermarché	+ 0"
6	Joes Oosterlinck (BEL)	Van Rysel–Roubaix	+ 0"
7	Paul Hennequin (FRA)	Euskaltel–Euskadi	+ 0"
8	Jesper Rasch (NED)	China Anta–Mentech Cycling Team	+ 0"
9	Pierre Barbier (FRA)	Terengganu Cycling Team	+ 0"
10	Adam Bradáč (CZE)	Factor Racing	+ 0"

General classification after Stage 2
Rank	Rider	Team	Time
1	Matteo Malucelli (ITA)	XDS Astana Team	5h 16' 02"
2	Joshua Giddings (GBR)	Lotto–Intermarché	+ 4"
3	Gleb Syritsa	XDS Astana Team	+ 15"
4	Cameron Scott (AUS)	Li-Ning Star	+ 15"
5	Su Haoyu (CHN)	XDS Astana Team	+ 16"
6	Luke Mudgway (NZL)	Li-Ning Star	+ 17"
7	Markus Pajur (EST)	FNIX–SCOM–Hengxiang Cycling Team	+ 17"
8	Lucas De Rossi (FRA)	China Anta–Mentech Cycling Team	+ 17"
9	Dušan Rajović (SRB)	Solution Tech NIPPO Rali	+ 18"
10	Matthew Fox (AUS)	Lotto–Intermarché	+ 18"

=== Stage 3 ===
14 September 2026 – Suzhou to Wujiang, 122 km (76 mi)

Stage 3 Result
Rank	Rider	Team	Time
1	Matteo Malucelli (ITA)	XDS Astana Team	2h 25' 34"
2	Gleb Syritsa	XDS Astana Team	+ 0"
3	Wang Ruidong (CHN)	Li-Ning Star	+ 0"
4	Joshua Giddings (GBR)	Lotto–Intermarché	+ 0"
5	Jesper Rasch (NED)	China Anta–Mentech Cycling Team	+ 0"
6	Cameron Scott (AUS)	Li-Ning Star	+ 0"
7	Hodei Muñoz (ESP)	Euskaltel–Euskadi	+ 0"
8	Joes Oosterlinck (BEL)	Van Rysel–Roubaix	+ 0"
9	Dušan Rajović (SRB)	Solution Tech NIPPO Rali	+ 0"
10	Alexander Salby (DEN)	Li-Ning Star	+ 0"

General classification after Stage 3
Rank	Rider	Team	Time
1	Matteo Malucelli (ITA)	XDS Astana Team	7h 41' 26"
2	Joshua Giddings (GBR)	Lotto–Intermarché	+ 12"
3	Gleb Syritsa	XDS Astana Team	+ 16"
4	Lucas De Rossi (FRA)	China Anta–Mentech Cycling Team	+ 24"
5	Cameron Scott (AUS)	Li-Ning Star	+ 25"
6	Alexander Konychev (ITA)	China Anta–Mentech Cycling Team	+ 26"
7	Su Haoyu (CHN)	XDS Astana Team	+ 26"
8	Luke Mudgway (NZL)	Li-Ning Star	+ 27"
9	Markus Pajur (EST)	FNIX–SCOM–Hengxiang Cycling Team	+ 27"
10	Dušan Rajović (SRB)	Solution Tech NIPPO Rali	+ 18"

=== Stage 4 ===
15 September 2026 – Qidong to Qidong, 79.2 km (49.2 mi)

Stage 4 Result
Rank	Rider	Team	Time
1	Matteo Malucelli (ITA)	XDS Astana Team	1h 37' 03"
2	Joshua Giddings (GBR)	Lotto–Intermarché	+ 0"
3	Dušan Rajović (SRB)	Solution Tech NIPPO Rali	+ 0"
4	Alexander Salby (DEN)	Li-Ning Star	+ 0"
5	Gleb Syritsa	XDS Astana Team	+ 0"
6	Cameron Scott (AUS)	Li-Ning Star	+ 0"
7	Adam Bradáč (CZE)	Factor Racing	+ 0"
8	Cristian Pita (ECU)	Roojai Insurance Winspace	+ 0"
9	Jesper Rasch (NED)	China Anta–Mentech Cycling Team	+ 0"
10	Kurt Eather (AUS)	CCACHE x BODYWRAP	+ 0"

General classification after Stage 4
Rank	Rider	Team	Time
1	Matteo Malucelli (ITA)	XDS Astana Team	9h 18' 19"
2	Joshua Giddings (GBR)	Lotto–Intermarché	+ 16"
3	Gleb Syritsa	XDS Astana Team	+ 26"
4	Markus Pajur (EST)	FNIX–SCOM–Hengxiang Cycling Team	+ 31"
5	Dušan Rajović (SRB)	Solution Tech NIPPO Rali	+ 34"
6	Lucas De Rossi (FRA)	China Anta–Mentech Cycling Team	+ 34"
7	Cameron Scott (AUS)	Li-Ning Star	+ 35"
8	Gari Ugarte (ESP)	Euskaltel–Euskadi	+ 35"
9	Alexander Konychev (ITA)	China Anta–Mentech Cycling Team	+ 36"
10	Su Haoyu (CHN)	XDS Astana Team	+ 36"

=== Stage 5 ===
16 September 2026 – Wuxi to Wuxi, 137.5 km (85.4 mi)

In the initial result Gleb Syritsa and Joshua Giddings had crossed the finish line in first and second place respectively, however after post-race review by race commissaires both riders were relegated to last place in their peloton group due to irregular sprint.

Stage 5 Result
Rank	Rider	Team	Time
1	Joes Oosterlinck (BEL)	Van Rysel–Roubaix	2h 47' 24"
2	Paul Hennequin (FRA)	Euskaltel–Euskadi	+ 0"
3	Célestin Wattelle (FRA)	Team Novo Nordisk	+ 0"
4	Jesper Rasch (NED)	China Anta–Mentech Cycling Team	+ 0"
5	Rens Grömmel (NED)	Azerion / Villa Valkenburg	+ 0"
6	Gari Ugarte (ESP)	Euskaltel–Euskadi	+ 0"
7	Đorđe Đurić (SRB)	Solution Tech NIPPO Rali	+ 0"
8	Hodei Muñoz (ESP)	Euskaltel–Euskadi	+ 0"
9	Sebastián Alexander Pita (ECU)	Shenzhen Kung Cycling Team	+ 0"
10	Tommaso Nencini (ITA)	Solution Tech NIPPO Rali	+ 0"

General classification after Stage 5
Rank	Rider	Team	Time
1	Matteo Malucelli (ITA)	XDS Astana Team	12h 05' 43"
2	Joshua Giddings (GBR)	Lotto–Intermarché	+ 14"
3	Gleb Syritsa	XDS Astana Team	+ 23"
4	Cameron Scott (AUS)	Li-Ning Star	+ 31"
5	Markus Pajur (EST)	FNIX–SCOM–Hengxiang Cycling Team	+ 31"
6	Paul Hennequin (FRA)	Euskaltel–Euskadi	+ 32"
7	Dušan Rajović (SRB)	Solution Tech NIPPO Rali	+ 34"
8	Lucas De Rossi (FRA)	China Anta–Mentech Cycling Team	+ 34"
9	Gari Ugarte (ESP)	Euskaltel–Euskadi	+ 35"
10	Luke Mudgway (NZL)	Li-Ning Star	+ 36"

== Classification leadership table ==
Classification leadership by stage
Stage	Winner	General classification	Points classification	Young rider classification	Team classification
1	Joshua Giddings	Joshua Giddings	Joshua Giddings (Note: On stage 2, Matteo Malucelli, who was second in the points classification, wore the green jersey, because first-placed Joshua Giddings wore the orange jersey as the leader of the general classification.)	Joshua Giddings (Note: On stage 2, Hodei Muñoz, who was second in the young rider classification, wore the blue jersey, because first-placed Joshua Giddings wore the orange jersey as the leader of the general classification.)	Euskaltel–Euskadi
2	Matteo Malucelli	Matteo Malucelli	Matteo Malucelli (Note: On stage 3, Dušan Rajović, who was third in the points classification, wore the green jersey, because first-placed Matteo Malucelli wore the orange jersey as the leader of the general classification, and second-placed Joshua Giddings wore the blue jersey as the leader of the young rider classification. On stage 4 and 5, Gleb Syritsa, who was third in the points classification, wore the green jersey for the same reason.)	Joshua Giddings	Lotto–Intermarché
3	Matteo Malucelli	Matteo Malucelli	Matteo Malucelli	Joshua Giddings	Lotto–Intermarché
4	Matteo Malucelli	Matteo Malucelli	Matteo Malucelli	Joshua Giddings	XDS Astana Team
5	Joes Oosterlinck	Matteo Malucelli	Matteo Malucelli	Joshua Giddings	Euskaltel–Euskadi
Final		Matteo Malucelli	Matteo Malucelli	Joshua Giddings	Euskaltel–Euskadi

== Classification standings ==
Legend
Denotes the winner of the general classification	Denotes the winner of the young rider classification
Denotes the winner of the points classification	

=== General classification ===
Final general classification
Rank	Rider	Team	Time
1	Matteo Malucelli (ITA)	XDS Astana Team	12h 05' 43"
2	Joshua Giddings (GBR)	Lotto–Intermarché	+ 14"
3	Gleb Syritsa	XDS Astana Team	+ 23"
4	Cameron Scott (AUS)	Li-Ning Star	+ 31"
5	Markus Pajur (EST)	FNIX–SCOM–Hengxiang Cycling Team	+ 31"
6	Paul Hennequin (FRA)	Euskaltel–Euskadi	+ 32"
7	Dušan Rajović (SRB)	Solution Tech NIPPO Rali	+ 34"
8	Lucas De Rossi (FRA)	China Anta–Mentech Cycling Team	+ 34"
9	Gari Ugarte (ESP)	Euskaltel–Euskadi	+ 35"
10	Luke Mudgway (NZL)	Li-Ning Star	+ 36"

=== Points classification ===
Final points classification
Rank	Rider	Team	Points
1	Matteo Malucelli (ITA)	XDS Astana Team	59
2	Joshua Giddings (GBR)	Lotto–Intermarché	50
3	Gleb Syritsa	XDS Astana Team	40
4	Dušan Rajović (SRB)	Solution Tech NIPPO Rali	29
5	Cameron Scott (AUS)	Li-Ning Star	26
6	Joes Oosterlinck (BEL)	Van Rysel–Roubaix	22
7	Alexander Salby (DEN)	Li-Ning Star	21
8	Paul Hennequin (FRA)	Euskaltel–Euskadi	20
9	Jesper Rasch (NED)	China Anta–Mentech Cycling Team	19
10	Markus Pajur (EST)	FNIX–SCOM–Hengxiang Cycling Team	13

=== Young rider classification ===
Final young rider classification
Rank	Rider	Team	Time
1	Joshua Giddings (GBR)	Lotto–Intermarché	12h 05' 57"
2	Gari Ugarte (ESP)	Euskaltel–Euskadi	+ 21"
3	Hodei Muñoz (ESP)	Euskaltel–Euskadi	+ 25"
4	Adam Bradáč (CZE)	Factor Racing	+ 25"
5	Alin Toader (ROU)	FNIX–SCOM–Hengxiang Cycling Team	+ 25"
6	Edward Pawson (NZL)	Roojai Insurance Winspace	+ 25"
7	Thibaut Bernard (BEL)	Lotto–Intermarché	+ 25"
8	Noah Blannin (AUS)	CCACHE x BODYWRAP	+ 25"
9	Oskar Küüt (EST)	Quick Pro Team	+ 25"
10	Luca Verrando (ITA)	Solution Tech NIPPO Rali	+ 25"

=== Team classification ===
Final team classification (1–10)
Rank	Team	Time
1	(Spain) Euskaltel–Euskadi	36h 19' 06"
2	(Kazakhstan) XDS Astana Team	+ 0"
3	(Belgium) Lotto–Intermarché	+ 0"
4	(France) Van Rysel–Roubaix	+ 0"
5	(China) Wheeltop Rotor Chengdu Team	+ 0"
6	China Anta–Mentech Cycling Team	+ 0"
7	(Italy) Solution Tech NIPPO Rali	+ 0"
8	(China) FNIX–SCOM–Hengxiang Cycling Team	+ 0"
9	(Estonia) Quick Pro Team	+ 0"
10	(Thailand) Roojai Insurance Winspace	+ 1' 04"
