= 2026 Tour of Magnificent Qinghai =

Chinese cycling race

2026 UCI ProSeries

Race details
- Dates: 11–18 July 2026
- Stages: 8
- Distance: 1,352.7 km (840.5 mi)
- Winning time: 24h 23' 26"

Results
| Jersey awarded to the overall winner | Winner | Jonathan Klever Caicedo (ECU) | (Wheeltop Rotor Chengdu Team) |
| | Second | Jan Castellon (ESP) | (Caja Rural–Seguros RGA) |
| | Third | Henok Mulubrhan (ERI) | (XDS Astana Team) |
| Jersey awarded to the points classification winner | Points | Henok Mulubrhan (ERI) | (XDS Astana Team) |
| Jersey awarded to the mountains classification winner | Mountains | Cristián Rodríguez (ESP) | (XDS Astana Team) |
| | Team | (Italy) Bardiani–CSF 7 Saber | |

The 2026 Tour of Magnificent Qinghai was a road cycling stage race that took place between 11 and 18 July 2026 in China. The race was rated as a category 2.Pro event on the 2026 UCI ProSeries calendar, and was the 25th edition of the Tour of Magnificent Qinghai.

== Teams ==
One UCI WorldTeam, eight UCI ProTeams, and thirteen UCI Continental teams made up the 22 teams that participated in the race.

UCI WorldTeams

- XDS Astana Team

UCI ProTeams

- Bardiani–CSF 7 Saber
- Burgos Burpellet BH
- Caja Rural–Seguros RGA
- Cofidis
- Euskaltel–Euskadi
- MBH Bank CSB Telecom Fort
- Solution Tech NIPPO Rali
- Team Polti VisitMalta

UCI Continental Teams

- 7 Eleven–Cliqq Roadbike Philippines
- Azerion / Villa Valkenburg
- Bodywrap LTwoo Cycling Team
- CCACHE x BODYWRAP
- China Anta–Mentech Cycling Team
- FNIX–SCOM–Hengxiang Cycling Team
- Li-Ning Star
- Qinghai Tianyoude Hotel Cycling Team
- Quick Pro Team
- Roojai Insurance Winspace
- Shenzhen Gineyea–Xidesheng Cycling Team
- Terengganu Cycling Team
- Wheeltop Rotor Chengdu Team

== Route ==
Stage characteristics and winners
| Stage | Date | Course | Distance | Type | Stage winner |
|---|---|---|---|---|---|
| 1 | 11 July | Xining to Xining | 120.6 km (74.9 mi) | Flat stage | Alexander Salby (DEN) |
| 2 | 12 July | Huangyuan to Menyuan | 224.6 km (139.6 mi) | Hilly stage | Gabriele Bessega (ITA) |
| 3 | 13 July | Menyuan to Huhzu | 167.7 km (104.2 mi) | Intermediate stage | Henok Mulubrhan (ERI) |
| 4 | 14 July | Huzhu to Guide | 195.7 km (121.6 mi) | Intermediate stage | Santiago Umba (COL) |
| 5 | 15 July | Guide to Gonghe | 135.5 km (84.2 mi) | Hilly stage | Christian Bagatin (ITA) |
| 6 | 16 July | Gonghe to Gangcha | 232.6 km (144.5 mi) | Flat stage | No winner |
| 7 | 17 July | Gangcha to Xihaizhen | 130 km (81 mi) | Hilly stage | César Macías (MEX) |
| 8 | 18 July | Xihaizhen to Qinghai Lake Scenic Area | 146 km (91 mi) | Hilly stage | Iúri Leitão (POR) |
| Total | | | 1,352.7 km (840.5 mi) | | |

== Stages ==
=== Stage 1 ===
11 July 2026 — Xining to Xining, 120.6 km (74.9 mi)

Stage 1 Result
| Rank | Rider | Team | Time |
|---|---|---|---|
| 1 | Alexander Salby (DEN) | Li-Ning Star | 2h 27' 53" |
| 2 | Iúri Leitão (POR) | Caja Rural–Seguros RGA | + 0" |
| 3 | Pierre Barbier (FRA) | Terengganu Cycling Team | + 0" |
| 4 | Alexis Renard (FRA) | Cofidis | + 0" |
| 5 | Enrico Zanoncello (ITA) | Bardiani–CSF 7 Saber | + 0" |
| 6 | Manuel Peñalver (ESP) | Team Polti VisitMalta | + 0" |
| 7 | Marco Manenti (ITA) | Bardiani–CSF 7 Saber | + 0" |
| 8 | Sergi Darder (ESP) | Caja Rural–Seguros RGA | + 0" |
| 9 | César Macías (MEX) | Burgos Burpellet BH | + 0" |
| 10 | Mathis Avondts (BEL) | Azerion / Villa Valkenburg | + 0" |

General classification after Stage 1
| Rank | Rider | Team | Time |
|---|---|---|---|
| 1 | Alexander Salby (DEN) | Li-Ning Star | 2h 27' 43" |
| 2 | Iúri Leitão (POR) | Caja Rural–Seguros RGA | + 4" |
| 3 | Markus Pajur (EST) | FNIX–SCOM–Hengxiang Cycling Team | + 4" |
| 4 | Pierre Barbier (FRA) | Terengganu Cycling Team | + 6" |
| 5 | Tegshbayar Batsaikhan (MGL) | Roojai Insurance Winspace | + 6" |
| 6 | Petr Rikunov | Wheeltop Rotor Chengdu Team | + 7" |
| 7 | Gabriele Bessega (ITA) | Team Polti VisitMalta | + 8" |
| 8 | Calum Johnston (GBR) | Li-Ning Star | + 8" |
| 9 | Henok Mulubrhan (ERI) | XDS Astana Team | + 9" |
| 10 | Alexis Renard (FRA) | Cofidis | + 10" |

=== Stage 2 ===
12 July 2026 — Huangyuan to Menyuan, 224.6 km (139.6 mi)

Stage 2 Result
| Rank | Rider | Team | Time |
|---|---|---|---|
| 1 | Gabriele Bessega (ITA) | Team Polti VisitMalta | 5h 17' 42" |
| 2 | Marco Manenti (ITA) | Bardiani–CSF 7 Saber | + 0" |
| 3 | Raman Tsishkou (BLR) | Li-Ning Star | + 0" |
| 4 | Petr Rikunov | Wheeltop Rotor Chengdu Team | + 0" |
| 5 | Fernando Barceló (ESP) | Caja Rural–Seguros RGA | + 0" |
| 6 | Alexis Renard (FRA) | Cofidis | + 0" |
| 7 | Rodrigo Álvarez (ESP) | Burgos Burpellet BH | + 0" |
| 8 | Andrea Piras (ITA) | Solution Tech NIPPO Rali | + 0" |
| 9 | Merhawi Kudus (ERI) | Burgos Burpellet BH | + 0" |
| 10 | Alexander Konychev (ITA) | China Anta–Mentech Cycling Team | + 0" |

General classification after Stage 2
| Rank | Rider | Team | Time |
|---|---|---|---|
| 1 | Gabriele Bessega (ITA) | Team Polti VisitMalta | 7h 45' 23" |
| 2 | Marco Manenti (ITA) | Bardiani–CSF 7 Saber | + 6" |
| 3 | Jonathan Klever Caicedo (ECU) | Wheeltop Rotor Chengdu Team | + 6" |
| 4 | Raman Tsishkou (BLR) | Li-Ning Star | + 8" |
| 5 | Tegshbayar Batsaikhan (MGL) | Roojai Insurance Winspace | + 8" |
| 6 | Jon Agirre (ESP) | Euskaltel–Euskadi | + 9" |
| 7 | Samuel Fernández (ESP) | Caja Rural–Seguros RGA | + 9" |
| 8 | Petr Rikunov | Wheeltop Rotor Chengdu Team | + 9" |
| 9 | Andrei Stepanov | Wheeltop Rotor Chengdu Team | + 10" |
| 10 | Calum Johnston (GBR) | Li-Ning Star | + 10" |

=== Stage 3 ===
13 July 2026 — Menyuan to Huhzu, 137.7 km (85.6 mi)

Stage 3 Result
| Rank | Rider | Team | Time |
|---|---|---|---|
| 1 | Henok Mulubrhan (ERI) | XDS Astana Team | 3h 33' 08" |
| 2 | Jonathan Klever Caicedo (ECU) | Wheeltop Rotor Chengdu Team | + 0" |
| 3 | Eric Antonio Fagúndez (URU) | Burgos Burpellet BH | + 0" |
| 4 | Jan Castellon (ESP) | Caja Rural–Seguros RGA | + 0" |
| 5 | Alex Tolio (ITA) | Bardiani–CSF 7 Saber | + 0" |
| 6 | Samuel Fernández (ESP) | Caja Rural–Seguros RGA | + 0" |
| 7 | Jon Agirre (ESP) | Euskaltel–Euskadi | + 0" |
| 8 | Jonas Rapp (GER) | FNIX–SCOM–Hengxiang Cycling Team | + 0" |
| 9 | Emanuel Buchmann (GER) | Cofidis | + 0" |
| 10 | Cristián Rodríguez (ESP) | XDS Astana Team | + 0" |

General classification after Stage 3
| Rank | Rider | Team | Time |
|---|---|---|---|
| 1 | Jonathan Klever Caicedo (ECU) | Wheeltop Rotor Chengdu Team | 11h 18' 31" |
| 2 | Henok Mulubrhan (ERI) | XDS Astana Team | + 1" |
| 3 | Eric Antonio Fagúndez (URU) | Burgos Burpellet BH | + 8" |
| 4 | Jon Agirre (ESP) | Euskaltel–Euskadi | + 9" |
| 5 | Samuel Fernández (ESP) | Caja Rural–Seguros RGA | + 9" |
| 6 | Cristián Rodríguez (ESP) | XDS Astana Team | + 10" |
| 7 | Alex Tolio (ITA) | Bardiani–CSF 7 Saber | + 12" |
| 8 | Jan Castellon (ESP) | Caja Rural–Seguros RGA | + 12" |
| 9 | Jonas Rapp (GER) | FNIX–SCOM–Hengxiang Cycling Team | + 12" |
| 10 | Emanuel Buchmann (GER) | Cofidis | + 12" |

=== Stage 4 ===
14 July 2026 — Huzhu to Guide, 195.7 km (121.6 mi)

Stage 4 Result
| Rank | Rider | Team | Time |
|---|---|---|---|
| 1 | Santiago Umba (COL) | Solution Tech NIPPO Rali | 4h 28' 31" |
| 2 | Jan Castellon (ESP) | Caja Rural–Seguros RGA | + 0" |
| 3 | Emanuel Buchmann (GER) | Cofidis | + 0" |
| 4 | Alastair Christie-Johnston (AUS) | CCACHE x BODYWRAP | + 12" |
| 5 | Alexander Konychev (ITA) | China Anta–Mentech Cycling Team | + 18" |
| 6 | Christian Bagatin (ITA) | MBH Bank CSB Telecom Fort | + 18" |
| 7 | Sergi Darder (ESP) | Caja Rural–Seguros RGA | + 20" |
| 8 | Rodrigo Álvarez (ESP) | Burgos Burpellet BH | + 20" |
| 9 | Henok Mulubrhan (ERI) | XDS Astana Team | + 20" |
| 10 | Alessio Martinelli (ITA) | Bardiani–CSF 7 Saber | + 20" |

General classification after Stage 4
| Rank | Rider | Team | Time |
|---|---|---|---|
| 1 | Jan Castellon (ESP) | Caja Rural–Seguros RGA | 15h 47' 08" |
| 2 | Emanuel Buchmann (GER) | Cofidis | + 2" |
| 3 | Henok Mulubrhan (ERI) | XDS Astana Team | + 14" |
| 4 | Jonathan Klever Caicedo (ECU) | Wheeltop Rotor Chengdu Team | + 14" |
| 5 | Eric Antonio Fagúndez (URU) | Burgos Burpellet BH | + 22" |
| 6 | Jon Agirre (ESP) | Euskaltel–Euskadi | + 23" |
| 7 | Samuel Fernández (ESP) | Caja Rural–Seguros RGA | + 23" |
| 8 | Cristián Rodríguez (ESP) | XDS Astana Team | + 24" |
| 9 | Alex Tolio (ITA) | Bardiani–CSF 7 Saber | + 26" |
| 10 | Jonas Rapp (GER) | FNIX–SCOM–Hengxiang Cycling Team | + 26" |

=== Stage 5 ===
15 July 2026 — Guide to Gonghe, 135.5 km (84.2 mi)

Stage 5 Result
| Rank | Rider | Team | Time |
|---|---|---|---|
| 1 | Christian Bagatin (ITA) | MBH Bank CSB Telecom Fort | 3h 21' 39" |
| 2 | Jonathan Klever Caicedo (ECU) | Wheeltop Rotor Chengdu Team | + 1' 03" |
| 3 | Eduardo Sepúlveda (ARG) | Li-Ning Star | + 1' 19" |
| 4 | Darren van Bekkum (NED) | XDS Astana Team | + 1' 19" |
| 5 | Luca Covili (ITA) | Bardiani–CSF 7 Saber | + 1' 19" |
| 6 | Alex Tolio (ITA) | Bardiani–CSF 7 Saber | + 1' 19" |
| 7 | Fernando Tercero (ESP) | Team Polti VisitMalta | + 1' 19" |
| 8 | Eric Antonio Fagúndez (URU) | Burgos Burpellet BH | + 1' 19" |
| 9 | Henok Mulubrhan (ERI) | XDS Astana Team | + 1' 19" |
| 10 | Jan Castellon (ESP) | Caja Rural–Seguros RGA | + 1' 19" |

General classification after Stage 5
| Rank | Rider | Team | Time |
|---|---|---|---|
| 1 | Jonathan Klever Caicedo (ECU) | Wheeltop Rotor Chengdu Team | 19h 09' 56" |
| 2 | Jan Castellon (ESP) | Caja Rural–Seguros RGA | + 9" |
| 3 | Henok Mulubrhan (ERI) | XDS Astana Team | + 21" |
| 4 | Eric Antonio Fagúndez (URU) | Burgos Burpellet BH | + 32" |
| 5 | Alex Tolio (ITA) | Bardiani–CSF 7 Saber | + 36" |
| 6 | Fernando Tercero (ESP) | Team Polti VisitMalta | + 2' 28" |
| 7 | Eduardo Sepúlveda (ARG) | Li-Ning Star | + 3' 55" |
| 8 | Luca Covili (ITA) | Bardiani–CSF 7 Saber | + 3' 59" |
| 9 | Emanuel Buchmann (GER) | Cofidis | + 6' 32" |
| 10 | Cristián Rodríguez (ESP) | XDS Astana Team | + 6' 52" |

=== Stage 6 ===
16 July 2026 — Gonghe to Gangcha, 232.6 km (144.5 mi)

The stage was neutralized after the 2nd KOM finish, and cancelled afterwards due to bad weather. Only the KOM points collected before the cancellation stands.

=== Stage 7 ===
17 July 2026 — Gangcha to Xihaizhen, 130 km (81 mi)

Stage 7 Result
| Rank | Rider | Team | Time |
|---|---|---|---|
| 1 | César Macías (MEX) | Burgos Burpellet BH | 2h 08' 57" |
| 2 | Tommaso Nencini (ITA) | Solution Tech NIPPO Rali | + 0" |
| 3 | Alexander Salby (DEN) | Li-Ning Star | + 0" |
| 4 | Maxime Duba (NED) | Azerion / Villa Valkenburg | + 0" |
| 5 | Manuel Peñalver (ESP) | Team Polti VisitMalta | + 0" |
| 6 | Cristian David Pita (ECU) | Roojai Insurance Winspace | + 0" |
| 7 | Iúri Leitão (POR) | Caja Rural–Seguros RGA | + 0" |
| 8 | Tilen Finkšt (SLO) | Solution Tech NIPPO Rali | + 0" |
| 9 | Oscar Gallagher (AUS) | CCACHE x BODYWRAP | + 0" |
| 10 | Marcin Budziński (POL) | MBH Bank CSB Telecom Fort | + 0" |

General classification after Stage 7
| Rank | Rider | Team | Time |
|---|---|---|---|
| 1 | Jonathan Klever Caicedo (ECU) | Wheeltop Rotor Chengdu Team | 21h 18' 50" |
| 2 | Jan Castellon (ESP) | Caja Rural–Seguros RGA | + 12" |
| 3 | Henok Mulubrhan (ERI) | XDS Astana Team | + 20" |
| 4 | Eric Antonio Fagúndez (URU) | Burgos Burpellet BH | + 34" |
| 5 | Alex Tolio (ITA) | Bardiani–CSF 7 Saber | + 39" |
| 6 | Fernando Tercero (ESP) | Team Polti VisitMalta | + 2' 31" |
| 7 | Eduardo Sepúlveda (ARG) | Li-Ning Star | + 3' 58" |
| 8 | Luca Covili (ITA) | Bardiani–CSF 7 Saber | + 4' 02" |
| 9 | Emanuel Buchmann (GER) | Cofidis | + 6' 42" |
| 10 | Cristián Rodríguez (ESP) | XDS Astana Team | + 7' 02" |

=== Stage 8 ===
18 July 2026 — Xihaizhen to Qinghai Lake Scenic Area, 146 km (91 mi)

Stage 8 Result
| Rank | Rider | Team | Time |
|---|---|---|---|
| 1 | Iúri Leitão (POR) | Caja Rural–Seguros RGA | 3h 04' 36" |
| 2 | Alexis Renard (FRA) | Cofidis | + 0" |
| 3 | Enrico Zanoncello (ITA) | Bardiani–CSF 7 Saber | + 0" |
| 4 | César Macías (MEX) | Burgos Burpellet BH | + 0" |
| 5 | Petr Rikunov | Wheeltop Rotor Chengdu Team | + 0" |
| 6 | Henok Mulubrhan (ERI) | XDS Astana Team | + 0" |
| 7 | Tilen Finkšt (SLO) | Solution Tech NIPPO Rali | + 0" |
| 8 | Alexander Konychev (ITA) | China Anta–Mentech Cycling Team | + 0" |
| 9 | Marcin Budziński (POL) | MBH Bank CSB Telecom Fort | + 0" |
| 10 | Gabriele Bessega (ITA) | Team Polti VisitMalta | + 0" |

General classification after Stage 8
| Rank | Rider | Team | Time |
|---|---|---|---|
| 1 | Jonathan Klever Caicedo (ECU) | Wheeltop Rotor Chengdu Team | 24h 23' 26" |
| 2 | Jan Castellon (ESP) | Caja Rural–Seguros RGA | + 12" |
| 3 | Henok Mulubrhan (ERI) | XDS Astana Team | + 15" |
| 4 | Eric Antonio Fagúndez (URU) | Burgos Burpellet BH | + 34" |
| 5 | Alex Tolio (ITA) | Bardiani–CSF 7 Saber | + 39" |
| 6 | Fernando Tercero (ESP) | Team Polti VisitMalta | + 2' 31" |
| 7 | Eduardo Sepúlveda (ARG) | Li-Ning Star | + 3' 58" |
| 8 | Luca Covili (ITA) | Bardiani–CSF 7 Saber | + 4' 02" |
| 9 | Emanuel Buchmann (GER) | Cofidis | + 6' 42" |
| 10 | Cristián Rodríguez (ESP) | XDS Astana Team | + 7' 02" |

== Classification leadership table ==
Classification leadership by stage
| Stage | Winner | General classification | Points classification | Mountains classification | Team classification |
|---|---|---|---|---|---|
| 1 | Alexander Salby | Alexander Salby | Alexander Salby (Note: On stage 2, Iúri Leitão, who was second in the points classification, wore the green jersey, because first-placed Alexander Salby wore the yellow jersey as the leader of the general classification.) | Markus Pajur | Caja Rural–Seguros RGA |
| 2 | Gabriele Bessega | Gabriele Bessega | Marco Manenti | Jonathan Klever Caicedo | Burgos Burpellet BH |
| 3 | Henok Mulubrhan | Jonathan Klever Caicedo | Alexander Salby | Jon Agirre | Caja Rural–Seguros RGA |
| 4 | Santiago Umba | Jan Castellon | Alexander Salby | Jon Agirre | Caja Rural–Seguros RGA |
| 5 | Christian Bagatin | Jonathan Klever Caicedo | Jonathan Klever Caicedo (Note: On stages 6 and 7, Henok Mulubrhan, who was second in the points classification, wore the green jersey, because first-placed Jonathan Klever Caicedo wore the yellow jersey as the leader of the general classification.) | Cristián Rodríguez | Bardiani–CSF 7 Saber |
| 6 | No winner | Jonathan Klever Caicedo | Jonathan Klever Caicedo | Jonas Rapp | Bardiani–CSF 7 Saber |
| 7 | César Macías | Jonathan Klever Caicedo | Henok Mulubrhan | Jonas Rapp | Bardiani–CSF 7 Saber |
| 8 | Iúri Leitão | Jonathan Klever Caicedo | Henok Mulubrhan | Cristián Rodríguez | Bardiani–CSF 7 Saber |
| Final | | Jonathan Klever Caicedo | Henok Mulubrhan | Cristián Rodríguez | Bardiani–CSF 7 Saber |

== Classification standings ==
Legend
| Denotes the winner of the general classification |
| Denotes the winner of the points classification |
| Denotes the winner of the mountains classification |

=== General classification ===
Final general classification (1–10)
| Rank | Rider | Team | Time |
|---|---|---|---|
| 1 | Jonathan Klever Caicedo (ECU) | Wheeltop Rotor Chengdu Team | 24h 23' 26" |
| 2 | Jan Castellon (ESP) | Caja Rural–Seguros RGA | + 12" |
| 3 | Henok Mulubrhan (ERI) | XDS Astana Team | + 15" |
| 4 | Eric Antonio Fagúndez (URU) | Burgos Burpellet BH | + 34" |
| 4 | Alex Tolio (ITA) | Bardiani–CSF 7 Saber | + 39" |
| 6 | Fernando Tercero (ESP) | Team Polti VisitMalta | + 2' 31" |
| 7 | Eduardo Sepúlveda (ARG) | Li-Ning Star | + 3' 58" |
| 8 | Luca Covili (ITA) | Bardiani–CSF 7 Saber | + 4' 02" |
| 9 | Emanuel Buchmann (GER) | Cofidis | + 6' 42" |
| 10 | Cristián Rodríguez (ESP) | XDS Astana Team | + 7' 02" |

=== Points classification ===
Final points classification (1–10)
| Rank | Rider | Team | Points |
|---|---|---|---|
| 1 | Henok Mulubrhan (ERI) | XDS Astana Team | 63 |
| 2 | Alexander Salby (DEN) | Li-Ning Star | 55 |
| 3 | Jonathan Klever Caicedo (ECU) | Wheeltop Rotor Chengdu Team | 49 |
| 4 | Iúri Leitão (POR) | Caja Rural–Seguros RGA | 48 |
| 5 | Alexis Renard (FRA) | Cofidis | 41 |
| 6 | César Macías (MEX) | Burgos Burpellet BH | 35 |
| 7 | Sergi Darder (ESP) | Caja Rural–Seguros RGA | 33 |
| 8 | Jan Castellon (ESP) | Caja Rural–Seguros RGA | 33 |
| 9 | Christian Bagatin (ITA) | MBH Bank CSB Telecom Fort | 31 |
| 10 | Raman Tsishkou (BLR) | Li-Ning Star | 31 |

=== Mountains classification ===
Final mountains classification (1–10)
| Rank | Rider | Team | Points |
|---|---|---|---|
| 1 | Cristián Rodríguez (ESP) | XDS Astana Team | 18 |
| 2 | Jonas Rapp (GER) | FNIX–SCOM–Hengxiang Cycling Team | 17 |
| 3 | Henok Mulubrhan (ERI) | XDS Astana Team | 16 |
| 4 | Edward Cruz (COL) | Bardiani–CSF 7 Saber | 16 |
| 5 | Jan Castellon (ESP) | Caja Rural–Seguros RGA | 12 |
| 6 | Jonathan Klever Caicedo (ECU) | Wheeltop Rotor Chengdu Team | 12 |
| 7 | Nils Sinschek (NED) | Li-Ning Star | 5 |
| 8 | Zeb Kyffin (GBR) | Terengganu Cycling Team | 5 |
| 9 | Diego Bracalente (ITA) | MBH Bank CSB Telecom Fort | 5 |
| 10 | Hernán Ricardo Aguirre (COL) | Qinghai Tianyoude Hotel Cycling Team | 3 |

=== Team classification ===
Final team classification (1–10)
| Rank | Team | Time |
|---|---|---|
| 1 | (Italy) Bardiani–CSF 7 Saber | 73h 23' 09" |
| 2 | (Kazakhstan) XDS Astana Team | + 13' 51" |
| 3 | (Italy) Team Polti VisitMalta | + 14' 42" |
| 4 | (Spain) Caja Rural–Seguros RGA | + 23' 19" |
| 5 | (China) Wheeltop Rotor Chengdu Team | + 23' 41" |
| 6 | (Hungary) MBH Bank CSB Telecom Fort | + 24' 27" |
| 7 | (Spain) Burgos Burpellet BH | + 27' 39" |
| 8 | (Spain) Euskaltel–Euskadi | + 52' 11" |
| 9 | (China) Qinghai Tianyoude Hotel Cycling Team | + 59' 38" |
| 10 | (Australia) CCACHE x BODYWRAP | + 59' 48" |

-->
