= 2026 Région Pays de la Loire Tour =

French cycling race

2026 UCI ProSeries

Race details
- Dates: 7–10 April 2026
- Stages: 4
- Distance: 719.6 km (447.1 mi)
- Winning time: 16h 08' 56"

Results
Jersey awarded to the overall winner	Winner	Antoine L'Hote (FRA)	(Decathlon CMA CGM)
	Second	Alexander Kamp (DEN)	(Uno-X Mobility)
	Third	Corbin Strong (NZL)	(NSN Cycling Team)
Jersey awarded to the points classification winner	Points	Corbin Strong (NZL)	(NSN Cycling Team)
Jersey awarded to the mountains classification winner	Mountains	Kévin Avoine (FRA)	(Van Rysel–Roubaix)
Jersey awarded to the youth classification winner	Youth	Antoine L'Hote (FRA)	(Decathlon CMA CGM)
	Team	(France) Unibet Rose Rockets	

The 2026 Région Pays de la Loire Tour was a road cycling stage race that took place between 7 and 10 April 2026 in the Pays de la Loire region of France. The race was rated as a category 2.Pro event on the 2026 UCI ProSeries calendar, and was the 72nd edition of the Région Pays de la Loire Tour.

== Teams ==
Five UCI WorldTeams, ten UCI ProTeams, and four UCI Continental teams made up the nineteen teams that participated in the race.

UCI WorldTeams

- Decathlon CMA CGM
- EF Education–EasyPost
- Groupama–FDJ United
- NSN Cycling Team
- Uno-X Mobility

UCI ProTeams

- Bardiani–CSF 7 Saber
- Caja Rural–Seguros RGA
- Cofidis
- Euskaltel–Euskadi
- Pinarello–Q36.5 Pro Cycling Team
- Team Flanders–Baloise
- Team Novo Nordisk
- Team Polti VisitMalta
- Team TotalEnergies
- Unibet Rose Rockets

UCI Continental Teams

- CIC Pro Cycling Academy
- Nice Métropole Côte d'Azur
- St. Michel–Preference Home–Auber93
- Van Rysel–Roubaix

== Route ==
Stage characteristics and winners
Stage	Date	Course	Distance	Type	Stage winner
1	7 April	Fontevraud-l'Abbaye to Vertou	187.5 km (116.5 mi)	Hilly stage	Ethan Vernon (GBR)
2	8 April	La Garnache to Les Sables d'Olonne	153.6 km (95.4 mi)	Flat stage	Ethan Vernon (GBR)
3	9 April	Avrillé to Sainte-Suzanne-et-Chammes	199 km (124 mi)	Hilly stage	Alexander Kamp (DEN)
4	10 April	Brûlon to Le Mans	179.5 km (111.5 mi)	Hilly stage	Antoine L'Hote (FRA)
Total			719.6 km (447.1 mi)		

== Stages ==
=== Stage 1 ===
7 April 2026 – Fontevraud-l'Abbaye to Vertou, 187.5 km (116.5 mi)

Stage 1 Result
Rank	Rider	Team	Time
1	Ethan Vernon (GBR)	NSN Cycling Team	3h 56' 40"
2	Erlend Blikra (NOR)	Uno-X Mobility	+ 0"
3	Noah Hobbs (GBR)	EF Education–EasyPost	+ 0"
4	Paul Penhoët (FRA)	Groupama–FDJ United	+ 0"
5	Joes Oosterlinck (BEL)	Van Rysel–Roubaix	+ 0"
6	Corbin Strong (NZL)	NSN Cycling Team	+ 0"
7	Manuel Peñalver (ESP)	Team Polti VisitMalta	+ 0"
8	Jason Tesson (FRA)	Team TotalEnergies	+ 0"
9	Nolan Huysmans (BEL)	Team Flanders–Baloise	+ 0"
10	Clement Venturini (FRA)	Unibet Rose Rockets	+ 0"

General classification after Stage 1
Rank	Rider	Team	Time
1	Ethan Vernon (GBR)	NSN Cycling Team	3h 56' 30"
2	Erlend Blikra (NOR)	Uno-X Mobility	+ 4"
3	Lander Loockx (BEL)	Unibet Rose Rockets	+ 4"
4	Axel van der Tuuk (NED)	Euskaltel–Euskadi	+ 4"
5	Noah Hobbs (GBR)	EF Education–EasyPost	+ 6"
6	Kévin Avoine (FRA)	Van Rysel–Roubaix	+ 6"
7	Gabriele Bessega (ITA)	Team Polti VisitMalta	+ 9"
8	Santiago Ferraro (ITA)	Bardiani–CSF 7 Saber	+ 9"
9	Paul Penhoët (FRA)	Groupama–FDJ United	+ 10"
10	Joes Oosterlinck (BEL)	Van Rysel–Roubaix	+ 10"

=== Stage 2 ===
8 April 2026 – La Garnache to Les Sables d'Olonne, 153.6 km (95.4 mi)

Stage 2 Result
Rank	Rider	Team	Time
1	Ethan Vernon (GBR)	NSN Cycling Team	3h 23' 49"
2	Erlend Blikra (NOR)	Uno-X Mobility	+ 0"
3	Sam Bennett (IRL)	Pinarello–Q36.5 Pro Cycling Team	+ 0"
4	Jason Tesson (FRA)	Team TotalEnergies	+ 0"
5	Enrico Zanoncello (ITA)	Bardiani–CSF 7 Saber	+ 0"
6	Gianluca Pollefliet (BEL)	Decathlon CMA CGM	+ 0"
7	Manuel Peñalver (ESP)	Team Polti VisitMalta	+ 0"
8	Corbin Strong (NZL)	NSN Cycling Team	+ 0"
9	Joes Oosterlinck (BEL)	Van Rysel–Roubaix	+ 0"
10	Mathias Sanlaville (FRA)	CIC Pro Cycling Academy	+ 0"

General classification after Stage 2
Rank	Rider	Team	Time
1	Ethan Vernon (GBR)	NSN Cycling Team	7h 20' 09"
2	Erlend Blikra (NOR)	Uno-X Mobility	+ 8"
3	Martin Marcellusi (ITA)	Bardiani–CSF 7 Saber	+ 12"
4	Simon Guglielmi (FRA)	St. Michel–Preference Home–Auber93	+ 13"
5	Lander Loockx (BEL)	Unibet Rose Rockets	+ 14"
6	Axel van der Tuuk (NED)	Euskaltel–Euskadi	+ 14"
7	Noah Hobbs (GBR)	EF Education–EasyPost	+ 16"
8	Sam Bennett (IRL)	Pinarello–Q36.5 Pro Cycling Team	+ 16"
9	Kévin Avoine (FRA)	Van Rysel–Roubaix	+ 16"
10	Gabriele Bessega (ITA)	Team Polti VisitMalta	+ 19"

=== Stage 3 ===
9 April 2026 – Avrillé to Sainte-Suzanne-et-Chammes, 199 km (124 mi)

Stage 3 Result
Rank	Rider	Team	Time
1	Alexander Kamp (DEN)	Uno-X Mobility	4h 37' 03"
2	Gabriele Bessega (ITA)	Team Polti VisitMalta	+ 0"
3	Antoine L'Hote (FRA)	Decathlon CMA CGM	+ 0"
4	Benjamin Thomas (FRA)	Cofidis	+ 0"
5	Gorka Sorarrain (ESP)	Caja Rural–Seguros RGA	+ 0"
6	Killian Théot (FRA)	Van Rysel–Roubaix	+ 0"
7	Corbin Strong (NZL)	NSN Cycling Team	+ 6"
8	Ewen Costiou (FRA)	Groupama–FDJ United	+ 6"
9	David González (ESP)	Pinarello–Q36.5 Pro Cycling Team	+ 6"
10	Clément Venturini (FRA)	Unibet Rose Rockets	+ 6"

General classification after Stage 3
Rank	Rider	Team	Time
1	Alexander Kamp (DEN)	Uno-X Mobility	11h 57' 21"
2	Gabriele Bessega (ITA)	Team Polti VisitMalta	+ 2"
3	Antoine L'Hote (FRA)	Decathlon CMA CGM	+ 4"
4	Martin Marcellusi (ITA)	Bardiani–CSF 7 Saber	+ 9"
5	Lander Loockx (BEL)	Unibet Rose Rockets	+ 11"
6	Killian Théot (FRA)	Van Rysel–Roubaix	+ 11"
7	Gorka Sorarrain (ESP)	Caja Rural–Seguros RGA	+ 11"
8	Benjamin Thomas (FRA)	Cofidis	+ 11"
9	Axel van der Tuuk (NED)	Euskaltel–Euskadi	+ 11"
10	Corbin Strong (NZL)	NSN Cycling Team	+ 14"

=== Stage 4 ===
10 April 2026 – Brûlon to Le Mans, 179.5 km (111.5 mi)

Stage 4 Result
Rank	Rider	Team	Time
1	Antoine L'Hote (FRA)	Decathlon CMA CGM	4h 11' 44"
2	Corbin Strong (NZL)	NSN Cycling Team	+ 3"
3	Clément Venturini (FRA)	Unibet Rose Rockets	+ 3"
4	Alexander Kamp (DEN)	Uno-X Mobility	+ 3"
5	Quinten Hermans (BEL)	Pinarello–Q36.5 Pro Cycling Team	+ 3"
6	Noa Isidore (FRA)	Decathlon CMA CGM	+ 14"
7	David González (ESP)	Pinarello–Q36.5 Pro Cycling Team	+ 14"
8	Martin Marcellusi (ITA)	Bardiani–CSF 7 Saber	+ 14"
9	Killian Théot (FRA)	Van Rysel–Roubaix	+ 14"
10	Sergi Darder (ESP)	Caja Rural–Seguros RGA	+ 14"

General classification after Stage 4
Rank	Rider	Team	Time
1	Antoine L'Hote (FRA)	Decathlon CMA CGM	16h 08' 56"
2	Alexander Kamp (DEN)	Uno-X Mobility	+ 12"
3	Corbin Strong (NZL)	NSN Cycling Team	+ 18"
4	Clément Venturini (FRA)	Unibet Rose Rockets	+ 25"
5	Martin Marcellusi (ITA)	Bardiani–CSF 7 Saber	+ 31"
6	Killian Théot (FRA)	Van Rysel–Roubaix	+ 34"
7	Lander Loockx (BEL)	Unibet Rose Rockets	+ 34"
8	Gorka Sorarrain (ESP)	Caja Rural–Seguros RGA	+ 34"
9	Axel van der Tuuk (NED)	Euskaltel–Euskadi	+ 34"
10	Bryan Coquard (FRA)	Cofidis	+ 35"

== Classification leadership table ==
Classification leadership by stage
Stage	Winner	General classification	Points classification	Mountains classification	Young rider classification	Team classification
1	Ethan Vernon	Ethan Vernon	Ethan Vernon	Lander Loockx	Noah Hobbs	Team Polti VisitMalta
2	Ethan Vernon	Ethan Vernon	Ethan Vernon	Similien Hamon	Noah Hobbs	Team Polti VisitMalta
3	Alexander Kamp	Alexander Kamp	Ethan Vernon	Kévin Avoine	Gabriele Bessega	Van Rysel–Roubaix
4	Antoine L'Hote	Antoine L'Hote	Corbin Strong	Kévin Avoine	Antoine L'Hote	Unibet Rose Rockets
Final		Antoine L'Hote	Corbin Strong	Kévin Avoine	Antoine L'Hote	Unibet Rose Rockets

== Classification standings ==
Legend
Denotes the winner of the general classification	Denotes the winner of the mountains classification
Denotes the winner of the points classification	Denotes the winner of the young rider classification

=== General classification ===
Final general classification (1–10)
Rank	Rider	Team	Time
1	Antoine L'Hote (FRA)	Decathlon CMA CGM	16h 08' 56"
2	Alexander Kamp (DEN)	Uno-X Mobility	+ 12"
3	Corbin Strong (NZL)	NSN Cycling Team	+ 18"
4	Clément Venturini (FRA)	Unibet Rose Rockets	+ 25"
5	Martin Marcellusi (ITA)	Bardiani–CSF 7 Saber	+ 31"
6	Killian Théot (FRA)	Van Rysel–Roubaix	+ 34"
7	Lander Loockx (BEL)	Unibet Rose Rockets	+ 34"
8	Gorka Sorarrain (ESP)	Caja Rural–Seguros RGA	+ 34"
9	Axel van der Tuuk (NED)	Euskaltel–Euskadi	+ 34"
10	Bryan Coquard (FRA)	Cofidis	+ 35"

=== Points classification ===
Final points classification (1-10)
Rank	Rider	Team	Points
1	Corbin Strong (NZL)	NSN Cycling Team	55
2	Antoine L'Hote (FRA)	Decathlon CMA CGM	51
3	Ethan Vernon (GBR)	NSN Cycling Team	50
4	Alexander Kamp (DEN)	Uno-X Mobility	40
5	Clément Venturini (FRA)	Unibet Rose Rockets	33
6	Gabriele Bessega (ITA)	Team Polti VisitMalta	24
7	Manuel Peñalver (ESP)	Team Polti VisitMalta	23
8	Martin Marcellusi (ITA)	Bardiani–CSF 7 Saber	22
9	Jason Tesson (FRA)	Team TotalEnergies	22
10	Joes Oosterlinck (BEL)	Van Rysel–Roubaix	19

=== Mountains classification ===
Final mountains classification (1-10)
Rank	Rider	Team	Points
1	Kévin Avoine (FRA)	Van Rysel–Roubaix	23
2	Similien Hamon (FRA)	CIC Pro Cycling Academy	20
3	Alexandre Delettre (FRA)	Team TotalEnergies	14
4	Antoine L'Hote (FRA)	Decathlon CMA CGM	10
5	Ewen Costiou (FRA)	Groupama–FDJ United	10
6	Clément Venturini (FRA)	Unibet Rose Rockets	8
7	Maël Guégan (FRA)	CIC Pro Cycling Academy	8
8	Mathis Le Berre (FRA)	Team TotalEnergies	6
9	Lander Loockx (BEL)	Unibet Rose Rockets	6
10	Tobias Svarre (DEN)	Uno-X Mobility	6

=== Young rider classification ===
Final young rider classification (1–10)
Rank	Rider	Team	Time
1	Antoine L'Hote (FRA)	Decathlon CMA CGM	16h 08' 56"
2	Dario Igor Belletta (ITA)	Team Polti VisitMalta	+ 40"
3	Noa Isidore (FRA)	Decathlon CMA CGM	+ 40"
4	Léandre Lozouet (FRA)	CIC Pro Cycling Academy	+ 2' 49"
5	Tobias Svarre (DEN)	Uno-X Mobility	+ 3' 12"
6	Lorenzo Conforti (ITA)	Bardiani–CSF 7 Saber	+ 3' 15"
7	Henrik Pedersen (DEN)	Uno-X Mobility	+ 3' 47"
8	Milan Van den Haute (BEL)	Team Flanders–Baloise	+ 10' 02"
9	Noah Hobbs (GBR)	EF Education–EasyPost	+ 10' 12"
10	Gabriele Bessega (ITA)	Team Polti VisitMalta	+ 10 '42"

=== Teams classification ===
Final team classification (1–10)
Rank	Team	Time
1	(France) Unibet Rose Rockets	48h 28' 37"
2	(France) Cofidis	+ 5"
3	(Belgium) Team Flanders–Baloise	+ 11"
4	(Switzerland) Pinarello–Q36.5 Pro Cycling Team	+ 1' 55"
5	(Spain) Caja Rural–Seguros RGA	+ 2' 11"
6	(Italy) Team Polti VisitMalta	+ 3' 11"
7	(Italy) Bardiani–CSF 7 Saber	+ 3' 47"
8	(France) St. Michel–Preference Home–Auber93	+ 3' 49"
9	(Norway) Uno-X Mobility	+ 4' 07"
10	(France) Van Rysel–Roubaix	+ 4' 21"
