= 2023 Tour of Hainan =

2023 UCI ProSeries

Race details
- Dates: 5–9 October 2023
- Stages: 5
- Distance: 781.1 km (485.4 mi)
- Winning time: 18h 02' 59"

Results
Jersey awarded to the overall winner	Winner	Óscar Sevilla (ESP)	(Team Medellín–EPM)
	Second	Sebastian Berwick (AUS)	(Israel–Premier Tech)
	Third	James Piccoli (CAN)	(China Glory Continental Cycling Team)
Jersey awarded to the points classification winner	Points	Nicolas Dalla Valle (ITA)	(Team Corratec–Selle Italia)
Jersey awarded to the mountains classification winner	Mountains	Michał Pomorski (POL)	(HRE Mazowsze Serce Polski)
	Team	Israel–Premier Tech	

The 2023 Tour of Hainan was a men's road cycling stage race which took place from 5 to 9 October 2023. It was the 14th edition of the Tour of Hainan, which is rated as a 2.Pro event on the 2023 UCI ProSeries calendars.

== Teams ==
Four UCI ProTeams, fourteen UCI Continental teams, and two national teams made up the twenty teams in the race.

UCI ProTeams

- Bolton Equities Black Spoke
- Israel–Premier Tech
- Team Novo Nordisk
- Team Corratec–Selle Italia

UCI Continental Teams

- ABLOC CT
- Bodywrap LTwoo Cycling Team
- China Glory Continental Cycling Team
- Hengxiang Cycling Team
- HRE Mazowsze Serce Polski
- Ljubljana Gusto Santic
- Li-Ning Star
- Pingtan International Tourism Island Cycling Team
- Roojai Online Insurance
- St George Continental Cycling Team
- Terengganu Polygon Cycling Team
- Team Medellín–EPM
- Tianyoude Hotel Cycling Team
- Wuzhishan Cycling Team

National teams

- China
- Mongolia

== Schedule ==
Stage characteristics and winners
Stage	Date	Route	Distance	Type	Stage winner
1	5 October	Qionghai to Qionghai	92.6 km (57.5 mi)	Flat stage	George Jackson (NZL)
2	6 October	Qionghai to Baoting	215.5 km (133.9 mi)	Medium-mountain stage	Sebastian Berwick (AUS)
3	7 October	Baoting to Wuzhishan	122.6 km (76.2 mi)	Mountain stage	James Piccoli (CAN)
4	8 October	Wuzhishan to Changjiang	147.1 km (91.4 mi)	Medium-mountain stage	Nicolas Dalla Valle (ITA)
5	9 October	Changjiang to Sanya	203.3 km (126.3 mi)	Hilly stage	Jesper Rasch (NED)
Total			781.1 km (485.4 mi)		

== Stages ==
=== Stage 1 ===
5 October 2023 – Qionghai to Qionghai, 92.6 km (57.5 mi)

Stage 1 Result
Rank	Rider	Team	Time
1	George Jackson (NZL)	Bolton Equities Black Spoke	2h 01' 38"
2	Nicolas Dalla Valle (ITA)	Team Corratec–Selle Italia	+ 0"
3	Lucas Carstensen (GER)	Roojai Online Insurance	+ 0"
4	Mohd Harrif Saleh (MAS)	Terengganu Polygon Cycling Team	+ 0"
5	Jiang Zhihui (CHN)	Li-Ning Star	+ 0"
6	Norbert Banaszek (POL)	HRE Mazowsze Serce Polski	+ 0"
7	Valerio Conti (ITA)	Team Corratec–Selle Italia	+ 0"
8	Dylan Hopkins (AUS)	Ljubljana Gusto Santic	+ 0"
9	Polychronis Tzortzakis (GRE)	Roojai Online Insurance	+ 0"
10	Taj Jones (AUS)	Israel–Premier Tech	+ 0"

General classification after Stage 1
Rank	Rider	Team	Time
1	George Jackson (NZL)	Bolton Equities Black Spoke	2h 01' 28"
2	Nicolas Dalla Valle (ITA)	Team Corratec–Selle Italia	+ 4"
3	Lucas Carstensen (GER)	Roojai Online Insurance	+ 6"
4	Lorenzo Quartucci (ITA)	Team Corratec–Selle Italia	+ 7"
5	Māris Bogdanovičs (LAT)	Hengxiang Cycling Team	+ 8"
6	Tom Sexton (NZL)	Bolton Equities Black Spoke	+ 9"
7	Mohd Harrif Saleh (MAS)	Terengganu Polygon Cycling Team	+ 10"
8	Jiang Zhihui (CHN)	Li-Ning Star	+ 10"
9	Norbert Banaszek (POL)	HRE Mazowsze Serce Polski	+ 10"
10	Valerio Conti (ITA)	Team Corratec–Selle Italia	+ 10"

=== Stage 2 ===
6 October 2023 – Qionghai to Baoting, 215.5 km (133.9 mi)

Stage 2 Result
Rank	Rider	Team	Time
1	Sebastian Berwick (AUS)	Israel–Premier Tech	4h 53' 28"
2	Óscar Sevilla (ESP)	Team Medellín–EPM	+ 0"
3	Ben Hermans (BEL)	Israel–Premier Tech	+ 0"
4	Valerio Conti (ITA)	Team Corratec–Selle Italia	+ 0"
5	Cristian Raileanu (ROM)	Hengxiang Cycling Team	+ 0"
6	Mason Hollyman (GBR)	Israel–Premier Tech	+ 3"
7	Josh Burnett (NZL)	Bolton Equities Black Spoke	+ 3"
8	Julien Trarieux (FRA)	China Glory Continental Cycling Team	+ 3"
9	James Piccoli (CAN)	China Glory Continental Cycling Team	+ 5"
10	Adne van Engelen (NED)	Roojai Online Insurance	+ 9"

General classification after Stage 2
Rank	Rider	Team	Time
1	Sebastian Berwick (AUS)	Israel–Premier Tech	6h 54' 56"
2	Óscar Sevilla (ESP)	Team Medellín–EPM	+ 1"
3	Ben Hermans (BEL)	Israel–Premier Tech	+ 6"
4	Cristian Raileanu (ROM)	Hengxiang Cycling Team	+ 9"
5	Valerio Conti (ITA)	Team Corratec–Selle Italia	+ 10"
6	Julien Trarieux (FRA)	China Glory Continental Cycling Team	+ 13"
7	Mason Hollyman (GBR)	Israel–Premier Tech	+ 13"
8	Josh Burnett (NZL)	Bolton Equities Black Spoke	+ 13"
9	James Piccoli (CAN)	China Glory Continental Cycling Team	+ 15"
10	Lorenzo Quartucci (ITA)	Team Corratec–Selle Italia	+ 17"

=== Stage 3 ===
7 October 2023 – Baoting to Wuzhishan, 122.6 km (76.2 mi)

Stage 3 Result
Rank	Rider	Team	Time
1	James Piccoli (CAN)	China Glory Continental Cycling Team	3h 08' 34"
2	Óscar Sevilla (ESP)	Team Medellín–EPM	+ 2"
3	Sebastian Berwick (AUS)	Israel–Premier Tech	+ 2"
4	Valerio Conti (ITA)	Team Corratec–Selle Italia	+ 2"
5	Ben Hermans (BEL)	Israel–Premier Tech	+ 4"
6	Julian Trarieux (FRA)	China Glory Continental Cycling Team	+ 38"
7	Lorenzo Quartucci (ITA)	Team Corratec–Selle Italia	+ 38"
8	David Lozano (ESP)	Team Novo Nordisk	+ 38"
9	Josh Burnett (NZL)	Bolton Equities Black Spoke	+ 38"
10	Mason Hollyman (GBR)	Israel–Premier Tech	+ 38"

General classification after Stage 3
Rank	Rider	Team	Time
1	Óscar Sevilla (ESP)	Team Medellín–EPM	10h 03' 27"
2	Sebastian Berwick (AUS)	Israel–Premier Tech	+ 1"
3	James Piccoli (CAN)	China Glory Continental Cycling Team	+ 8"
4	Ben Hermans (BEL)	Israel–Premier Tech	+ 13"
5	Valerio Conti (ITA)	Team Corratec–Selle Italia	+ 15"
6	Cristian Raileanu (ROM)	Hengxiang Cycling Team	+ 50"
7	Julien Trarieux (FRA)	China Glory Continental Cycling Team	+ 54"
8	Mason Hollyman (GBR)	Israel–Premier Tech	+ 54"
9	Josh Burnett (NZL)	Bolton Equities Black Spoke	+ 54"
10	Lorenzo Quartucci (ITA)	Team Corratec–Selle Italia	+ 58"

=== Stage 4 ===
8 October 2023 – Wuzhishan to Changjiang, 147.1 km (91.4 mi)

Stage 4 Result
Rank	Rider	Team	Time
1	Nicolas Dalla Valle (ITA)	Team Corratec–Selle Italia	3h 30' 18"
2	Julien Trarieux (FRA)	China Glory Continental Cycling Team	+ 0"
3	George Jackson (NZL)	Bolton Equities Black Spoke	+ 0"
4	Norbert Banaszek (POL)	HRE Mazowsze Serce Polski	+ 0"
5	Marcin Budziński (POL)	HRE Mazowsze Serce Polski	+ 0"
6	Cristian Raileanu (ROM)	Hengxiang Cycling Team	+ 0"
7	Viktor Potočki (CRO)	Ljubljana Gusto Santic	+ 0"
8	Hamish Beadle (NZL)	Team Novo Nordisk	+ 0"
9	Roman Maikin	Pingtan International Tourism Island Cycling Team	+ 0"
10	Māris Bogdanovičs (LAT)	Hengxiang Cycling Team	+ 0"

General classification after Stage 4
Rank	Rider	Team	Time
1	Óscar Sevilla (ESP)	Team Medellín–EPM	13h 33' 45"
2	Sebastian Berwick (AUS)	Israel–Premier Tech	+ 1"
3	James Piccoli (CAN)	China Glory Continental Cycling Team	+ 8"
4	Ben Hermans (BEL)	Israel–Premier Tech	+ 13"
5	Valerio Conti (ITA)	Team Corratec–Selle Italia	+ 15"
6	Julien Trarieux (FRA)	China Glory Continental Cycling Team	+ 48"
7	Cristian Raileanu (ROM)	Hengxiang Cycling Team	+ 50"
8	Josh Burnett (NZL)	Bolton Equities Black Spoke	+ 53"
9	Mason Hollyman (GBR)	Israel–Premier Tech	+ 54"
10	Lorenzo Quartucci (ITA)	Team Corratec–Selle Italia	+ 55"

=== Stage 5 ===
9 October 2023 – Changjiang to Sanya, 203.3 km (126.3 mi)

Stage 5 Result
Rank	Rider	Team	Time
1	Jesper Rasch (NED)	ABLOC CT	4h 29' 14"
2	Itamar Einhorn (ISR)	Israel–Premier Tech	+ 0"
3	Nicolas Dalla Valle (ITA)	Team Corratec–Selle Italia	+ 0"
4	Norbert Banaszek (POL)	HRE Mazowsze Serce Polski	+ 0"
5	Māris Bogdanovičs (LAT)	Hengxiang Cycling Team	+ 0"
6	Tom Sexton (NZL)	Bolton Equities Black Spoke	+ 0"
7	Nick Kergozou (NZL)	St George Continental Cycling Team	+ 0"
8	Viktor Potočki (CRO)	Ljubljana Gusto Santic	+ 0"
9	Polychronis Tzortzakis (GRE)	Roojai Online Insurance	+ 0"
10	Marcin Budziński (POL)	HRE Mazowsze Serce Polski	+ 0"

General classification after Stage 5
Rank	Rider	Team	Time
1	Óscar Sevilla (ESP)	Team Medellín–EPM	18h 02' 59"
2	Sebastian Berwick (AUS)	Israel–Premier Tech	+ 1"
3	James Piccoli (CAN)	China Glory Continental Cycling Team	+ 8"
4	Ben Hermans (BEL)	Israel–Premier Tech	+ 13"
5	Valerio Conti (ITA)	Team Corratec–Selle Italia	+ 15"
6	Julien Trarieux (FRA)	China Glory Continental Cycling Team	+ 48"
7	Cristian Raileanu (ROM)	Hengxiang Cycling Team	+ 50"
8	Josh Burnett (NZL)	Bolton Equities Black Spoke	+ 53"
9	Mason Hollyman (GBR)	Israel–Premier Tech	+ 54"
10	Lorenzo Quartucci (ITA)	Team Corratec–Selle Italia	+ 55"

== Classification leadership table ==
Classification leadership by stage
Stage	Winner	General classification	Points classification	Mountains classification	Team classification
1	George Jackson	George Jackson	George Jackson	Óscar Sevilla	Team Corratec–Selle Italia
2	Sebastian Berwick	Sebastian Berwick	Valerio Conti	Óscar Sevilla	Israel–Premier Tech
3	James Piccoli	Óscar Sevilla	Óscar Sevilla	Wilmar Paredes	Israel–Premier Tech
4	Nicolas Dalla Valle	Óscar Sevilla	Sebastian Berwick	Michał Pomorski	Israel–Premier Tech
5	Jesper Rasch	Óscar Sevilla	Nicolas Dalla Valle	Michał Pomorski	Israel–Premier Tech
Final		Óscar Sevilla	Nicolas Dalla Valle	Michał Pomorski	Israel–Premier Tech

== Classification standings ==
Legend
Denotes the leader of the general classification
Denotes the leader of the points classification
Denotes the leader of the mountains classification

=== General classification ===
Final general classification (1–10)
Rank	Rider	Team	Time
1	Óscar Sevilla (ESP)	Team Medellín–EPM	18h 02' 59"
2	Sebastian Berwick (AUS)	Israel–Premier Tech	+ 1"
3	James Piccoli (CAN)	China Glory Continental Cycling Team	+ 8"
4	Ben Hermans (BEL)	Israel–Premier Tech	+ 13"
5	Valerio Conti (ITA)	Team Corratec–Selle Italia	+ 15"
6	Julien Trarieux (FRA)	China Glory Continental Cycling Team	+ 48"
7	Cristian Raileanu (ROM)	Hengxiang Cycling Team	+ 50"
8	Josh Burnett (NZL)	Bolton Equities Black Spoke	+ 53"
9	Mason Hollyman (GBR)	Israel–Premier Tech	+ 54"
10	Lorenzo Quartucci (ITA)	Team Corratec–Selle Italia	+ 55"

=== Points classification ===
Final points classification (1–10)
Rank	Rider	Team	Points
1	Nicolas Dalla Valle (ITA)	Team Corratec–Selle Italia	47
2	Julien Trarieux (FRA)	China Glory Continental Cycling Team	37
3	Sebastian Berwick (AUS)	Israel–Premier Tech	35
4	George Jackson (NZL)	Bolton Equities Black Spoke	34
5	Valerio Conti (ITA)	Team Corratec–Selle Italia	34
6	Norbert Banaszek (POL)	HRE Mazowsze Serce Polski	34
7	Óscar Sevilla (ESP)	Team Medellín–EPM	33
8	Cristian Raileanu (ROM)	Hengxiang Cycling Team	26
9	James Piccoli (CAN)	China Glory Continental Cycling Team	24
10	Lorenzo Quartucci (ITA)	Team Corratec–Selle Italia	24

=== Mountains classification ===
Final mountains classification (1–10)
Rank	Rider	Team	Points
1	Michał Pomorski (POL)	HRE Mazowsze Serce Polski	19
2	Óscar Sevilla (ESP)	Team Medellín–EPM	18
3	Wilmar Paredes (COL)	Team Medellín–EPM	17
4	Jelle Johannink (NED)	ABLOC CT	17
5	Adne van Engelen (NED)	Roojai Online Insurance	15
6	Sebastian Berwick (AUS)	Israel–Premier Tech	14
7	Lucas De Rossi (FRA)	China Glory Continental Cycling Team	13
8	Nils Sinschek (NED)	ABLOC CT	10
9	Davide Baldaccini (ITA)	Team Corratec–Selle Italia	9
10	Myagmarsuren Baasankhuu (MGL)	Mongolia	7

=== Team classification ===
Final team classification (1–10)
Rank	Team	Time
1	Israel–Premier Tech	54h 10' 23"
2	China Glory Continental Cycling Team	+ 50"
3	(Italy) Team Corratec–Selle Italia	+ 51"
4	(Poland) HRE Mazowsze Serce Polski	+ 10' 52"
5	(New Zealand) Bolton Equities Black Spoke	+ 16' 23"
6	(United States) Team Novo Nordisk	+ 18' 35"
7	(Netherlands) ABLOC CT	+ 23' 16"
8	(Slovenia) Ljubljana Gusto Santic	+ 31' 20"
9	(China) Hengxiang Cycling Team	+ 33' 49"
10	(Colombia) Team Medellín–EPM	+ 40' 48"
