= 2023 Tour of Taihu Lake =

2023 UCI ProSeries

Race details
- Dates: 14 – 17 September 2023
- Stages: 4
- Distance: 419.8 km (260.9 mi)
- Winning time: 8h 27' 36"

Results
Jersey awarded to the overall winner	Winner	George Jackson (NZL)	(Bolton Equities Black Spoke)
	Second	Enrico Zanoncello (ITA)	(Green Project–Bardiani–CSF–Faizanè)
	Third	Jarne Van de Paar (BEL)	(Lotto–Dstny)
Jersey awarded to the points classification winner	Points	George Jackson (NZL)	(Bolton Equities Black Spoke)
Jersey awarded to the young rider classification winner	Young rider	George Jackson (NZL)	(Bolton Equities Black Spoke)
	Team	(Italy) Team Corratec–Selle Italia	

The 2023 Tour of Taihu Lake was a men's road cycling stage race which took place from 14 to 17 September 2023. It was the 11th edition of the Tour of Taihu Lake, which is rated as a 2.Pro event on the 2023 UCI ProSeries calendars.

== Teams ==
Six UCI ProTeams, twelve UCI Continental teams, and two national teams made up the twenty teams in the race.

UCI ProTeams

- Bolton Equities Black Spoke
- Burgos BH
- Green Project–Bardiani–CSF–Faizanè
- Lotto–Dstny
- Team Corratec–Selle Italia
- Team Novo Nordisk

UCI Continental Teams

- ABLOC CT
- Bodywrap LTwoo Cycling Team
- China Glory Continental Cycling Team
- Hengxiang Cycling Team
- Giant Cycling Team
- HRE Mazowsze Serce Polski
- Li-Ning Star
- Nusantara Cycling Team
- Pingtan International Tourism Island Cycling Team
- Roojai Online Insurance
- St George Continental Cycling Team
- Tianyoude Hotel Cycling Team

UCI Continental Teams

- China
- Thailand

== Schedule ==
Stage characteristics and winners
Stage	Date	Route	Distance	Type	Stage winner
1	14 September	Wuxi to Wuxi	88.8 km (55.2 mi)	Flat stage	Enrico Zanoncello (ITA)
2	15 September	Kunshan to Kunshan	141.8 km (88.1 mi)	Flat stage	Jarne Van de Paar (BEL)
3	16 September	Wujiang to Wujiang	116.8 km (72.6 mi)	Flat stage	George Jackson (NZL)
4	17 September	Gaochun to Gaochun	72.4 km (45.0 mi)	Flat stage	George Jackson (NZL)
Total			419.8 km (260.9 mi)		

== Stages ==
=== Stage 1 ===
14 September 2023 – Wuxi to Wuxi, 88.8 km (55.2 mi)

Stage 1 Result
Rank	Rider	Team	Time
1	Enrico Zanoncello (ITA)	Green Project–Bardiani–CSF–Faizanè	1h 46' 24"
2	Lorenzo Conforti (ITA)	Green Project–Bardiani–CSF–Faizanè	+ 0"
3	Jarne Van de Paar (BEL)	Lotto–Dstny	+ 0"
4	Attilio Viviani (ITA)	Team Corratec–Selle Italia	+ 0"
5	Miguel Ángel Fernández (ESP)	Burgos BH	+ 0"
6	Māris Bogdanovičs (LAT)	Hengxiang Cycling Team	+ 0"
7	Matthew Bostock (GBR)	Bolton Equities Black Spoke	+ 0"
8	Sarawut Sirironnachai (THA)	Thailand	+ 0"
9	George Jackson (NZL)	Bolton Equities Black Spoke	+ 0"
10	Jesper Rasch (NED)	ABLOC CT	+ 0"

General classification after Stage 1
Rank	Rider	Team	Time
1	Enrico Zanoncello (ITA)	Green Project–Bardiani–CSF–Faizanè	1h 46' 13"
2	Lorenzo Conforti (ITA)	Green Project–Bardiani–CSF–Faizanè	+ 5"
3	Jarne Van de Paar (BEL)	Lotto–Dstny	+ 7"
4	George Jackson (NZL)	Bolton Equities Black Spoke	+ 8"
5	Norbert Banaszek (POL)	HRE Mazowsze Serce Polski	+ 8"
6	Matthew Bostock (GBR)	Bolton Equities Black Spoke	+ 9"
7	Michael Schwarzmann (GER)	Lotto–Dstny	+ 9"
8	Luke Verburg (NED)	ABLOC CT	+ 10"
9	Attilio Viviani (ITA)	Team Corratec–Selle Italia	+ 11"
10	Miguel Ángel Fernández (ESP)	Burgos BH	+ 11"

=== Stage 2 ===
15 September 2023 – Kunshan to Kunshan, 141.8 km (88.1 mi)

Stage 2 Result
Rank	Rider	Team	Time
1	Jarne Van de Paar (BEL)	Lotto–Dstny	2h 38' 52"
2	George Jackson (NZL)	Bolton Equities Black Spoke	+ 0"
3	Enrico Zanoncello (ITA)	Green Project–Bardiani–CSF–Faizanè	+ 0"
4	Miguel Ángel Fernández (ESP)	Burgos BH	+ 0"
5	Lucas Carstensen (GER)	Roojai Online Insurance	+ 0"
6	Norbert Banaszek (POL)	HRE Mazowsze Serce Polski	+ 0"
7	Julien Trarieux (FRA)	China Glory Continental Cycling Team	+ 0"
8	Luke Mudgway (NZL)	Bolton Equities Black Spoke	+ 0"
9	Jesper Rasch (NED)	ABLOC CT	+ 0"
10	Attilio Viviani (ITA)	Team Corratec–Selle Italia	+ 0"

General classification after Stage 2
Rank	Rider	Team	Time
1	Enrico Zanoncello (ITA)	Green Project–Bardiani–CSF–Faizanè	4h 24' 59"
2	Jarne Van de Paar (BEL)	Lotto–Dstny	+ 3"
3	George Jackson (NZL)	Bolton Equities Black Spoke	+ 8"
4	Lorenzo Conforti (ITA)	Green Project–Bardiani–CSF–Faizanè	+ 11"
5	Matthew Bostock (GBR)	Bolton Equities Black Spoke	+ 11"
6	Polychronis Tzortzakis (GRE)	Roojai Online Insurance	+ 13"
7	Norbert Banaszek (POL)	HRE Mazowsze Serce Polski	+ 14"
8	Lucas Carstensen (GER)	Roojai Online Insurance	+ 14"
9	Liam Slock (BEL)	Lotto–Dstny	+ 15"
10	Michael Schwarzmann (GER)	Lotto–Dstny	+ 15"

=== Stage 3 ===
16 September 2023 – Wujiang to Wujiang, 116.8 km (72.6 mi)

Stage 3 Result
Rank	Rider	Team	Time
1	George Jackson (NZL)	Bolton Equities Black Spoke	2h 24' 43"
2	Jesper Rasch (NED)	ABLOC CT	+ 0"
3	Jarne Van de Paar (BEL)	Lotto–Dstny	+ 0"
4	Sebastián Mora (ESP)	Burgos BH	+ 0"
5	Attilio Viviani (ITA)	Team Corratec–Selle Italia	+ 0"
6	Norbert Banaszek (POL)	HRE Mazowsze Serce Polski	+ 0"
7	Davide Gabburo (ITA)	Green Project–Bardiani–CSF–Faizanè	+ 0"
8	Māris Bogdanovičs (LAT)	Hengxiang Cycling Team	+ 0"
9	Lorenzo Conforti (ITA)	Green Project–Bardiani–CSF–Faizanè	+ 0"
10	Jiang Zhi Hui (CHN)	Li-Ning Star	+ 0"

General classification after Stage 3
Rank	Rider	Team	Time
1	George Jackson (NZL)	Bolton Equities Black Spoke	6h 49' 39"
2	Enrico Zanoncello (ITA)	Green Project–Bardiani–CSF–Faizanè	+ 1"
3	Jarne Van de Paar (BEL)	Lotto–Dstny	+ 2"
4	Matthew Bostock (GBR)	Bolton Equities Black Spoke	+ 11"
5	Jesper Rasch (NED)	ABLOC CT	+ 14"
6	Norbert Banaszek (POL)	HRE Mazowsze Serce Polski	+ 14"
7	Lorenzo Conforti (ITA)	Green Project–Bardiani–CSF–Faizanè	+ 14"
8	Polychronis Tzortzakis (GRE)	Roojai Online Insurance	+ 16"
9	Lucas Carstensen (GER)	Roojai Online Insurance	+ 17"
10	Tobiasz Pawlak (POL)	HRE Mazowsze Serce Polski	+ 18"

=== Stage 4 ===
17 September 2023 – Gaochun to Gaochun, 72.44 km (45.01 mi)

Stage 4 Result
Rank	Rider	Team	Time
1	George Jackson (NZL)	Bolton Equities Black Spoke	1h 38' 07"
2	Lucas Carstensen (GER)	Roojai Online Insurance	+ 0"
3	Norbert Banaszek (POL)	HRE Mazowsze Serce Polski	+ 0"
4	Jarne Van de Paar (BEL)	Lotto–Dstny	+ 0"
5	Nicolas Dalla Valle (ITA)	Team Corratec–Selle Italia	+ 0"
6	Miguel Ángel Fernández (ESP)	Burgos BH	+ 0"
7	Enrico Zanoncello (ITA)	Green Project–Bardiani–CSF–Faizanè	+ 0"
8	Tomasz Budziński (POL)	HRE Mazowsze Serce Polski	+ 0"
9	Li Shuai (CHN)	Pingtan International Tourism Island Cycling Team	+ 0"
10	Li Hu (CHN)	Tianyoude Hotel Cycling Team	+ 0"

General classification after Stage 4
Rank	Rider	Team	Time
1	George Jackson (NZL)	Bolton Equities Black Spoke	8h 27' 36"
2	Enrico Zanoncello (ITA)	Green Project–Bardiani–CSF–Faizanè	+ 11"
3	Jarne Van de Paar (BEL)	Lotto–Dstny	+ 12"
4	Norbert Banaszek (POL)	HRE Mazowsze Serce Polski	+ 20"
5	Matthew Bostock (GBR)	Bolton Equities Black Spoke	+ 20"
6	Lucas Carstensen (GER)	Roojai Online Insurance	+ 21"
7	Jesper Rasch (NED)	ABLOC CT	+ 24"
8	Lorenzo Conforti (ITA)	Green Project–Bardiani–CSF–Faizanè	+ 24"
9	Polychronis Tzortzakis (GRE)	Roojai Online Insurance	+ 26"
10	Lucas De Rossi (FRA)	China Glory Continental Cycling Team	+ 27"

== Classification leadership table ==
Classification leadership by stage
Stage	Winner	General classification	Points classification	Young rider classification	Team classification
1	Enrico Zanoncello	Enrico Zanoncello	Enrico Zanoncello	Lorenzo Conforti	Team Corratec–Selle Italia
2	Jarne Van de Paar	Enrico Zanoncello	Enrico Zanoncello	Jarne Van de Paar	Team Corratec–Selle Italia
3	George Jackson	George Jackson	George Jackson	George Jackson	Team Corratec–Selle Italia
4	George Jackson	George Jackson	George Jackson	George Jackson	Team Corratec–Selle Italia
Final		George Jackson	George Jackson	George Jackson	Team Corratec–Selle Italia

== Classification standings ==
Legend
Denotes the winner of the general classification	Denotes the winner of the young rider classification
Denotes the winner of the points classification	

=== General classification ===
Final general classification (1–10)
Rank	Rider	Team	Time
1	George Jackson (NZL)	Bolton Equities Black Spoke	8h 27' 36"
2	Enrico Zanoncello (ITA)	Green Project–Bardiani–CSF–Faizanè	+ 11"
3	Jarne Van de Paar (BEL)	Lotto–Dstny	+ 12"
4	Norbert Banaszek (POL)	HRE Mazowsze Serce Polski	+ 20"
5	Matthew Bostock (GBR)	Bolton Equities Black Spoke	+ 20"
6	Lucas Carstensen (GER)	Roojai Online Insurance	+ 21"
7	Jesper Rasch (NED)	ABLOC CT	+ 24"
8	Lorenzo Conforti (ITA)	Green Project–Bardiani–CSF–Faizanè	+ 24"
9	Polychronis Tzortzakis (GRE)	Roojai Online Insurance	+ 26"
10	Lucas De Rossi (FRA)	China Glory Continental Cycling Team	+ 27"

=== Points classification ===
Final points classification (1–10)
Rank	Rider	Team	Points
1	George Jackson (NZL)	Bolton Equities Black Spoke	48
2	Jarne Van de Paar (BEL)	Lotto–Dstny	42
3	Enrico Zanoncello (ITA)	Green Project–Bardiani–CSF–Faizanè	35
4	Norbert Banaszek (POL)	HRE Mazowsze Serce Polski	30
5	Lucas Carstensen (GER)	Roojai Online Insurance	23
6	Matthew Bostock (GBR)	Bolton Equities Black Spoke	19
7	Miguel Ángel Fernández (ESP)	Burgos BH	19
8	Jesper Rasch (NED)	ABLOC CT	15
9	Attilio Viviani (ITA)	Team Corratec–Selle Italia	15
10	Lorenzo Conforti (ITA)	Green Project–Bardiani–CSF–Faizanè	14

=== Young rider classification ===
Final young rider classification (1–10)
Rank	Rider	Team	Time
1	George Jackson (NZL)	Bolton Equities Black Spoke	8h 27' 36"
2	Jarne Van de Paar (BEL)	INEOS Grenadiers	+ 12"
3	Lorenzo Conforti (ITA)	Green Project–Bardiani–CSF–Faizanè	+ 24"
4	Liam Slock (BEL)	Lotto–Dstny	+ 28"
5	Hu Haije (CHN)	China	+ 30"
6	Milan Paulus (BEL)	Lotto–Dstny	+ 30"
7	Arttasorn Pansaard (THA)	Roojai Online Insurance	+ 30"
8	Yu Yanfeng (CHN)	Pingtan International Tourism Island Cycling Team	+ 30"
9	Niu Gaoshang (CHN)	Bodywrap LTwoo Cycling Team	+ 30"
10	Noppachai Klahan (THA)	Thailand	+ 30"

=== Team classification ===
Final team classification (1–10)
Rank	Team	Time
1	(Italy) Team Corratec–Selle Italia	25h 24' 18"
2	(Italy) Green Project–Bardiani–CSF–Faizanè	+ 0"
3	(Poland) HRE Mazowsze Serce Polski	+ 0"
4	(New Zealand) Bolton Equities Black Spoke	+ 0"
5	(Spain) Burgos BH	+ 0"
6	(China) Hengxiang Cycling Team	+ 0"
7	(Thailand) Roojai Online Insurance	+ 0"
8	(Belgium) Lotto–Dstny	+ 0"
9	(Netherlands) ABLOC CT	+ 0"
10	(China) Pingtan International Tourism Island Cycling Team	+ 0"
