= Quartucci =

Quartucci is an Italian surname. Notable people with the surname include:

- Lorenzo Quartucci (born 1999), Italian cyclist
- Pedro Quartucci (1905–1983), Argentine boxer and actor
