= Joes Oosterlinck =

Belgian bicycle racer

Personal information
- Born: 22 May 2003 (age 23) Aalst, Belgium

Cycling career
- Sport: Cycling
- Current team: Van Rysel–Roubaix
- Discipline: Road
- Role: Sprinter

Amateur teams
- 2020-2021: Canguru - QTS - Air College Cycling Team
- 2022-2023: EFC-L&R - Van Mossel

Professional teams
- 2024: Bingoal WB Devo Team
- 2025: VolkerWessels Cycling Team
- 2026–: Van Rysel–Roubaix

Joes Oosterlinck (born 22 May 2003) is a Belgian cyclist, who currently rides for UCI Continental team Van Rysel–Roubaix.

He won his first professional title in a peculiar manner. In Stage 5 of the 2026 Tour of Taihu Lake, he finished third behind Gleb Syritsa and Joshua Giddings in a bunch sprint. However, both riders were relegated to last place after the race jury found them guilty of an irregular sprint, and Oosterlinck was promoted to first place.

== Major results ==
2023
5th SD WORX BW Classic
2025
5th Elfstedenronde
2026 (1 pro win)
1st Stage 5 Tour of Taihu Lake
5th Grand Prix de la ville de Pérenchies
