= Cycling at the 2018 Asian Games – Men's cross-country =

Men's cross-country at the 2018 Asian Games
- Venue: Khe Bun Hill
- Date: 21 August 2018
- Competitors: 22 from 14 nations

Medalists
gold medal	Ma Hao	China
silver medal	Lü Xianjing	China
bronze medal	Kirill Kazantsev	Kazakhstan

The men's cross country competition at the 2018 Asian Games was held on 21 August 2018 at the Khe Bun Hill in Subang Regency.

== Schedule ==
All times are Western Indonesia Time (UTC+07:00)

Date	Time	Event
Monday, 21 August 2018	13:30	Final

== Results ==
Rank	Athlete	Time
1st place, gold medalist(s)	Ma Hao (CHN)	1:34:58
2nd place, silver medalist(s)	Lü Xianjing (CHN)	1:36:02
3rd place, bronze medalist(s)	Kirill Kazantsev (KAZ)	1:37:30
4	Faraz Shokri (IRI)	1:37:54
5	Mohammad Poursharif (IRI)	1:40:48
6	Toki Sawada (JPN)	1:41:10
7	Pariwat Tanlek (THA)	1:41:25
8	Shakir Adilov (KAZ)	1:41:31
9	Rafika Mokhamad Farisi (INA)	1:41:41
10	Kwon Soon-woo (KOR)	1:42:03
11	Keerati Sukprasart (THA)	1:44:07
12	Yoo Bum-jin (KOR)	−2 laps
13	Chandra Rafsanzani (INA)	−2 laps
14	Lai Chun Kin (HKG)	−2 laps
15	Chiang Sheng-shan (TPE)	−2 laps
16	Nino Surban (PHI)	−3 laps
17	Buddhi Bahadur Tamang (NEP)	−4 laps
18	Elias Abou Rachid (LBN)	−4 laps
19	Diamantino Carvalho (TLS)	−4 laps
20	Sugarmaagiin Ayuush-Ochir (MGL)	−4 laps
21	Eugenio Tilman (TLS)	−5 laps
22	Boldyn Iderbold (MGL)	−5 laps
