= Antoine L'Hote =

French cyclist

Personal information
- Born: 27 May 2005 (age 21) Beuvry, France
- Height: 1.90 m (6 ft 3 in)
- Weight: 67 kg (148 lb)

Cycling career
- Sport: Cycling
- Current team: Decathlon CMA CGM Team
- Discipline: Road
- Role: Rider
- Rider type: Puncheur

Amateur teams
- 2022: VC Roubaix
- 2023: AG2R Citroën U19 Team

Professional teams
- 2024–2025: Decathlon–AG2R La Mondiale Development Team
- 2026–: Decathlon CMA CGM

Major wins
- Stage races Région Pays de la Loire Tour (2026)

Antoine L'Hote (born 27 May 2005) is a French road cyclist, who rides for UCI WorldTeam Decathlon CMA CGM Team.

== Major results ==
2022
1st Road race, National Junior Road Championships
2023
1st Time trial, Championnat des Hauts-de-France
6th Overall La Philippe Gilbert Juniors
2024
1st Overall Tour d'Eure-et-Loir

1st Points classification
1st Young rider classification
1st Stage 1

1st Paris–Tours Espoirs
2025
1st Overall Olympia's Tour

1st Young rider classification
1st Stage 5

3rd Road race, National Under-23 Road Championships
3rd Piccolo Giro di Lombardia
3rd Ruota d'Oro
2026 (2 pro wins)
1st Overall Région Pays de la Loire Tour

1st Young rider classification
1st Stage 4

6th Overall Tour du Limousin
