= Christian Bagatin =

Italian cyclist

- Bagatin at 2025 Tour of Romania

Personal information
- Born: 14 June 2002 (age 24) Cittiglio, Italy
- Height: 1.83 m (6 ft 0 in)
- Weight: 75 kg (165 lb)

Cycling career
- Sport: Cycling
- Current team: MBH Bank CSB Telecom Fort
- Discipline: Road
- Role: Rider

Amateur team
- 2019–2020: C.C. Canturino 1902 A.S.D.

Professional teams
- 2021–2023: Iseo–Rime–Carnovali
- 2024–: Team MBH Bank Colpack Ballan

Christian Bagatin (born 14 June 2002) is an Italian cyclist, who currently rides for UCI ProTeam MBH Bank CSB Telecom Fort. In May 2026, he won stage six of the Tour of Turkiye in a solo finish. Two months later, he won a stage of the Tour of Magnificent Qinghai.

== Major results ==
2019
5th Trofeo Buffoni
2022
5th Time trial, National Under-23 Road Championships
2023
1st Gran Premio Industrie del Marmo
2024
3rd Time trial, National Under-23 Road Championships
3rd Giro del Casentino
3rd Milano–Busseto
6th Gran Premio della Liberazione
2025
3rd Gran Premio Industria e Commercio Artigianato Carnaghese
8th Gran Premio Santa Rita
2026 (2 pro wins)
1st Stage 6 Tour of Turkiye
1st Stage 5 Tour of Magnificent Qinghai
