= César Macías =

Mexican road racing cyclist

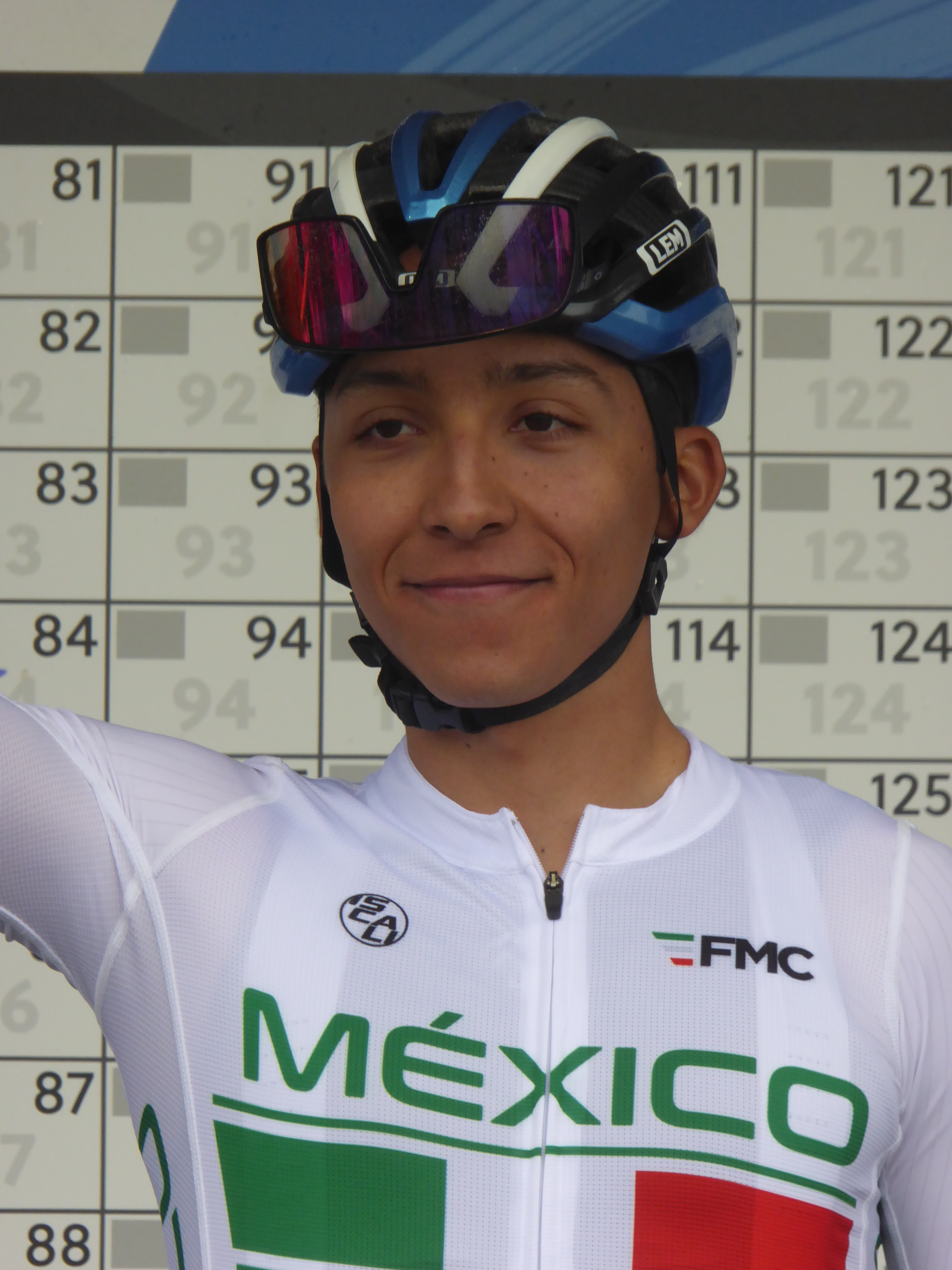
- Macías in 2023

Personal information
- Full name: César Macías Estrada
- Born: 17 September 2003 (age 23) Guadalajara, Mexico
- Height: 1.65 m (5 ft 5 in)
- Weight: 57 kg (126 lb)

Cycling career
- Sport: Cycling
- Current team: Burgos Burpellet BH
- Discipline: Road
- Role: Rider

Amateur team
- 2021: Start Junior Team

Professional teams
- 2022: Start Cycling Team
- 2022: EvoPro Racing
- 2023–2025: Petrolike
- 2026–: Burgos Burpellet BH

César Macías Estrada (born 17 September 2003) is a Mexican cyclist, who currently rides for UCI ProTeam Burgos Burpellet BH.

== Major results ==
2022
7th Districtenpijl - Ekeren-Deurne
2023
8th Road race, Pan American Under-23 Road Championships
2024
1st Stage 4 Giro della Regione Friuli Venezia Giulia
6th Road race, Pan American Under-23 Road Championships
2025
3rd Trofeo Piva
6th Coppa della Pace
7th Trofeo Alcide De Gasperi
7th Giro del Belvedere
8th Trofeo Palma
2026 (1 pro win)
1st Stage 7 Tour of Magnificent Qinghai
2nd Road race, Pan American Road Championships
9th Tour de Vendée
