= Mason Hollyman =

English cyclist (born 2000)

Personal information
- Born: 25 June 2000 (age 26) Huddersfield, England
- Height: 1.74 m (5 ft 9 in)
- Weight: 59 kg (130 lb)

Cycling career
- Sport: Cycling
- Current team: NSN Cycling Team
- Discipline: Road
- Role: Rider
- Rider type: Climber

Amateur teams
- 2017: Identity Racing
- 2018: Zappi Racing Team
- 2019–2020: Holdsworth Zappi RT

Professional teams
- 2021–2022: Israel Cycling Academy
- 2023–: Israel–Premier Tech

Mason Hollyman (born 25 June 2000) is a British cyclist, who currently rides for UCI ProTeam NSN Cycling Team.

== Major results ==
2017
6th Overall Giro di Basilicata

1st Stage 2

2018
3rd Overall Driedaagse van Axel
6th Trofeo Buffoni
2020
9th Overall Tour of Bulgaria
2021 (1 pro win)
1st Trofeo Andratx U23
1st Stage 5 Volta a Portugal
9th Overall Troféu Joaquim Agostinho
2022
1st Stage 1 Giro della Valle d'Aosta
4th Trofeo Piva
5th Liège–Bastogne–Liège Espoirs
6th Overall Alpes Isère Tour
2023
7th Overall Czech Tour
9th Overall Tour of Hainan
2024 (1)
1st Stage 2 Tour de Taiwan
