= Lü Xianjing =

Chinese cyclist (born 1998)

Personal information
- Full name: Lü Xianjing
- Born: 2 February 1998 (age 28) Yunnan, China

Cycling career
- Sport: Cycling
- Current team: China Anta–Mentech Cycling Team
- Disciplines: Road; Mountain biking
- Role: Rider
- Rider type: Climber

Professional teams
- 2018–2020: Hengxiang Cycling Team
- 2021: CFC Continental Team
- 2022-: China Anta–Mentech Cycling Team
Medal record
Representing China
Men's cycling
Asian Games
Silver medal – second place	2018 Jakarta	cross-country
Asian Championships
Gold medal – first place	2025 Phitsanulok	Road race
Silver medal – second place	2019 Tashkent	Road race
Silver medal – second place	2024 Almaty	Road race

Lü Xianjing (Chinese: 吕先景; pinyin: Lǚ Xiānjǐng; born 2 February 1998) is a Chinese cyclist, who currently rides for UCI Continental team China Anta–Mentech Cycling Team.

== Major results ==
2018
3rd Overall Tour of Fuzhou

1st Stage 1

5th Overall Tour of Hainan

1st Mountains classification

2019
1st Overall Tour of China II
Tour of Quanzhou Bay

1st Mountains classification
1st Stage 3

2nd Road race, Asian Road Championships
4th Overall Tour of Fuzhou
2023
1st Overall Tour of Poyang Lake

1st Stage 1

2nd Overall Tour of Sakarya

1st Stage 3

6th Alanya CUP
10th Road race, National Road Championships
2024
1st Grand Prix Syedra Ancient City
1st Stage 2 Tour of Sakarya
2nd Road race, Asian Road Championships
4th Road race, National Road Championships
5th Grand Prix Apollon Temple
5th Overall Tour of Mersin
10th GP Brda-Collio
