= Jarne Van de Paar =

Belgian cyclist

Personal information
- Born: 23 October 2000 (age 25) Balen, Belgium
- Height: 1.87 m (6 ft 2 in)
- Weight: 79 kg (174 lb)

Cycling career
- Sport: Cycling
- Current team: Retired
- Discipline: Road
- Role: Rider
- Rider type: Sprinter

Amateur teams
- 2017–2018: Acrog–Balen BC
- 2019–2022: Lotto–Soudal U23

Professional team
- 2023–2025: Lotto–Dstny

Jarne Van de Paar (born 23 October 2000) is a Belgian former professional cyclist, who competed for UCI ProTeam Lotto. He is the 2022 Under-23 Belgian Road Race Champion. Just a few days after becoming a professional, he finished 3rd in the 2023 Trofeo Palma.

== Major results ==
2017
2nd Grand Prix Bati-Metallo
2018
1st Young rider classification, SPIE Internationale Juniorendriedaagse
1st Stage 2 Oberösterreich Juniorenrundfahrt
4th Kuurne–Brussels–Kuurne Junioren
6th Menen–Kemmel–Menen
7th E3 Harelbeke Junioren
9th Tour of Flanders Juniors
2019
2nd Youngster Coast Challenge
3rd De Kustpijl
2020
4th Overall Tour Bitwa Warszawska 1920
2022
1st Road race, National Under-23 Road Championships
5th Kemmel Koerse
7th Grote Prijs Rik Van Looy
2023 (1 pro win)
3rd Overall Tour of Taihu Lake

1st Stage 2

3rd Trofeo Palma
4th Overall Tour du Loir-et-Cher

1st Points classification
1st Stage 2

6th Veenendaal–Veenendaal Classic
2024 (1)
1st Grote Prijs Jean-Pierre Monseré
2nd Elfstedenronde
7th Trofeo Palma
8th Veenendaal–Veenendaal
