= Joshua Giddings =

Joshua Giddings may refer to:

- Joshua Reed Giddings (1795–1864), American attorney, politician, and abolitionist
- Joshua Giddings (cyclist) (born 2003), British track and road cyclist
