= Lorenzo Quartucci =

Italian cyclist (born 1999)

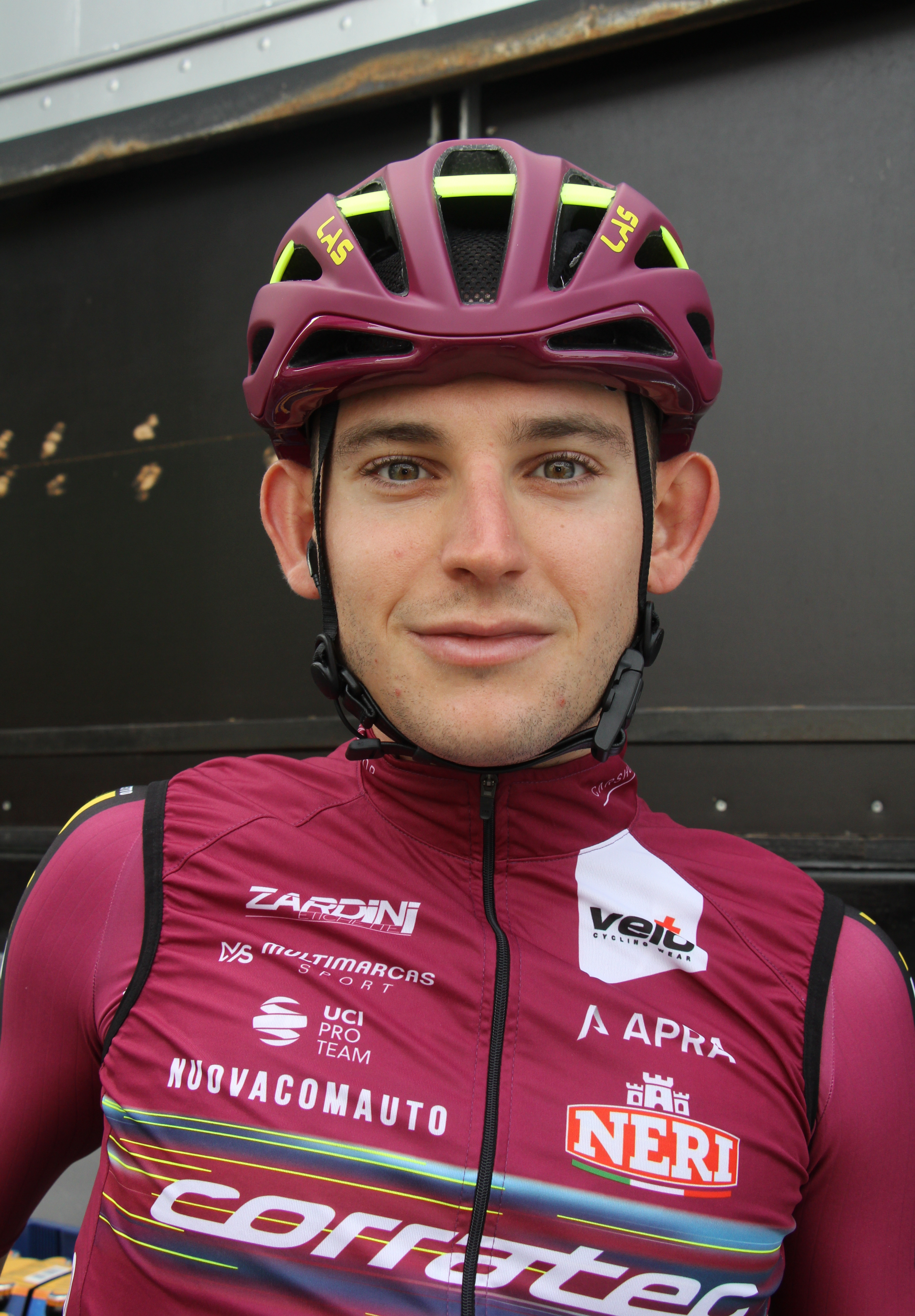
- Quartucci in 2023

Personal information
- Born: 5 April 1999 (age 27) San Giustino, Italy
- Height: 1.70 m (5 ft 7 in)
- Weight: 64 kg (141 lb)

Cycling career
- Sport: Cycling
- Current team: Solution Tech NIPPO Rali
- Discipline: Road
- Role: Rider

Amateur teams
- 2018: Fortebraccio da Montone
- 2019: Team Cinelli
- 2020: Zalf–Euromobil–Désirée–Fior
- 2022: Casillo–Petroli Firenze–Hopplà

Professional teams
- 2021: Zalf Euromobil Fior
- 2021: D'Amico–UM Tools
- 2023–: Team Corratec

Lorenzo Quartucci (born 5 April 1999) is an Italian racing cyclist, who currently rides for UCI ProTeam Solution Tech NIPPO Rali.

== Major results ==
2019
2nd Giro del Casentino
2021
3rd Gran Premio della Liberazione
4th Gran Premio Sportivi di Poggiana
2022
1st Giro delle Valli Aretine
2nd Trofeo Città di Brescia
2023
4th Due Giorni Marchigiana - G.P. Santa Rita
10th Overall Tour of Hainan
2024
6th GP Vorarlberg
8th Overall Tour of Istanbul
9th Overall Tour of Hainan
2025 (1 pro win)
1st Stage 4 Tour of Thailand
4th Overall Tour of Sharjah
5th Overall Tour de Taiwan
6th Overall Czech Tour
9th Trofeo Matteotti
2026
9th Overall Tour de Taiwan
