= Jesper Rasch =

Dutch cyclist (born 1998)

Personal information
- Born: 22 March 1998 (age 28) Zandvoort, Netherlands
- Height: 1.78 m (5 ft 10 in)
- Weight: 71 kg (157 lb)

Cycling career
- Sport: Cycling
- Current team: Azerion / Villa Valkenburg
- Discipline: Road
- Role: Rider
- Rider type: Sprinter

Amateur teams
- 2017: WV Noord Holland
- 2018: WV West Frisia

Professional teams
- 2018: SEG Racing Academy (stagiaire)
- 2019–2021: SEG Racing Academy
- 2022–: Abloc CT

Jesper Rasch (born 22 March 1998) is a Dutch professional road cyclist, who currently rides for UCI Continental team Azerion / Villa Valkenburg.

== Major results ==
2016
4th Trofeo comune di Vertova
9th Omloop der Vlaamse Gewesten
2019
4th Youngster Coast Challenge
10th De Kustpijl
2021
4th Omloop der Kempen
8th Ster van Zwolle
2022
1st Puchar Ministra Obrony Narodowej
2nd Overall Dookoła Mazowsza

1st Stage 4

6th Ronde van Overijssel
8th Omloop der Kempen
10th Arno Wallaard Memorial
2023 (1 pro win)
1st Stage 5 Tour of Hainan
1st Stage 3 Tour of Poyang Lake
1st Stage 4 Tour du Loir-et-Cher
2nd Omloop der Kempen
4th Puchar Ministra Obrony Narodowej
7th Overall Tour of Taihu Lake
8th Veenendaal–Veenendaal
