= Su Haoyu =

Chinese cyclist

Personal information
- Born: 26 October 2000 (age 25) China
- Height: 1.79 m (5 ft 10 in)
- Weight: 64 kg (141 lb)

Cycling career
- Sport: Cycling
- Current team: XDS Astana Team
- Discipline: Road
- Role: Rider

Professional teams
- 2021–2022: Li-Ning Star Cycling Team
- 2023–2024: China Glory Continental Cycling Team
- 2025–: XDS Astana Team

Su Haoyu (born 26 October 2000) is a Chinese road cyclist, who currently rides for UCI WorldTeam XDS Astana Team.

== Major results ==
2022
4th Overall Tour of Qinghai Lake
2023
3rd Time trial, National Championships
7th Grand Prix Aspendos
2024
4th Time trial, National Championships
8th The Bueng Si Fai International Road Race
2025
2nd Road race, National Championships
2nd Time trial, National Championships
2026
2nd Road race, Asian Cycling Championships
