= Lucas De Rossi =

French cyclist

Personal information
- Full name: Lucas De Rossi
- Born: 16 August 1995 (age 31) Marseille, France

Cycling career
- Sport: Cycling
- Current team: China Anta–Mentech Cycling Team
- Discipline: Road
- Role: Rider

Amateur teams
- 2015: Aix VTT Thrifty
- 2016–2017: VC La Pomme Marseille
- 2016: Delko–Marseille Provence KTM (stagiaire)

Professional teams
- 2018–2021: Delko–Marseille Provence KTM
- 2022–: China Glory Continental Cycling Team

Lucas De Rossi (born 16 August 1995 in Marseille) is a French cyclist, who currently rides for UCI Continental team China Anta–Mentech Cycling Team.

== Major results ==
2016
10th Overall Tour of Taihu Lake
2017
9th Overall Volta a Portugal do Futuro

1st Young rider classification

2019
5th Overall Tour of Almaty
2020
5th Overall Tour of Bulgaria
2023
10th Overall Tour of Taihu Lake
