= Julien Trarieux =

French racing cyclist (born 1992)

Personal information
- Born: 19 August 1992 (age 34) Nice, France
- Height: 1.83 m (6 ft 0 in)
- Weight: 71 kg (157 lb)

Cycling career
- Sport: Cycling
- Current team: China Anta–Mentech Cycling Team
- Disciplines: Road; Mountain biking
- Role: Rider

Amateur teams
- 2011–2012: GT–Skoda–Chamonix
- 2013: SC Nice
- 2014–2017: AVC Aix-en-Provence
- 2022: AVC Aix-en-Provence

Professional teams
- 2018–2021: Delko–Marseille Provence KTM
- 2023–: China Glory Continental Cycling Team
Medal record
Representing France
Men's mountain bike racing
World Championships
| Silver medal – second place | 2010 Mont Sainte-Anne | Junior cross-country |

Julien Trarieux (born 19 August 1992) is a French road cyclist and mountain biker, who currently rides for UCI Continental team China Anta–Mentech Cycling Team.

== Major results ==
=== Mountain bike ===
2010
1st Cross-country, National Junior Championships
2nd Cross-country, UCI World Junior Championships
2011
2nd Cross-country, National Under-23 Championships
2013
1st Cross-country, National Under-23 Championships
2015
1st Banyoles
2016
UCI MTB Marathon Series

1st Roc d'Azur

=== Road ===
2017
2nd Grand Prix du Pays d'Aix
2nd Tour du Pays Lionnais
3rd Circuit des 4 Cantons
2019
4th Grand Prix d'Ouverture La Marseillaise
9th Cholet-Pays de Loire
9th Tour de Vendée
2021
9th Paris–Tours
2023
1st Overall Tour of Huangshan

1st Points classification
1st Stage 3

4th Overall Tour of Poyang Lake
6th Overall Tour of Hainan
7th Overall Tour of Sakarya
7th GP Slovenian Istria
9th Overall Belgrade Banjaluka
2024
1st Alanya Cup
2nd Grand Prix Syedra Ancient City
