= Lorenzo Conforti =

Italian road cyclist (born 2004)

Personal information
- Born: May 22, 2004 (age 22) Monsummano Terme, Italy

Cycling career
- Sport: Cycling
- Current team: Bardiani–CSF 7 Saber
- Discipline: Road
- Role: Rider

Amateur teams
- 2021: G.S. Stabbia
- 2022: Team Work Service Speedy Bike

Professional team
- 2023–: Green Project–Bardiani–CSF–Faizanè

Lorenzo Conforti (born 22 May 2004) is an Italian road cyclist, who currently rides for UCI ProTeam Bardiani–CSF 7 Saber.

== Major results ==
2021
9th Gran Premio Eccellenze Valli del Soligo (TTT)
2022
1st Gran Premio Eccellenze Valli del Soligo (TTT)
7th Trofeo Guido Dorigo
8th Giro di Primavera
2023
7th Overall Belgrade–Banja Luka

1st Young rider classification

8th Poreč Trophy
8th Overall Tour of Taihu Lake
2024
2nd Poreč Trophy
2nd GP Goriška & Vipava Valley
4th Trofej Umag
5th Giro della Provincia di Biella
9th GP Slovenian Istria
