= Tour of Taihu Lake =

Chinese multi-day road cycling race

- 2026 Tour of Taihu Lake

Race details
- Date: October/November (2010–2019); September (2023–)
- Region: Jiangsu, China
- Discipline: Road
- Competition: UCI Asia Tour 2.1 (2012-2022, 2026-); UCI Asia Tour 1.2 (2010); UCI Asia Tour 2.2 (2011); UCI ProSeries 2.Pro (2023-2025)
- Type: Stage race
- Web site: www.taihucycling.com

History
- First edition: 2010
- Editions: 13 (as of 2025)
- First winner: David Kemp (AUS)
- Most wins: Jakub Mareczko (ITA); Matteo Malucelli (ITA) (2 wins)
- Most recent: Matteo Malucelli (ITA)

The Tour of Taihu Lake is a multi-day road cycling race held annually in southern Jiangsu, China, near the Taihu Lake. It has been held since 2010, but the first edition was a one-day race. The 2010 and 2011 editions were rated 1.2 and 2.2, and was upgraded to 2.1 in 2013. In 2023, the race became part of the UCI ProSeries.

Jakub Mareczko holds the record for most stage wins, with 18, as of the end of the 2018 edition of the race.

After cancellations in 2020-2022, the race returns on 14-17 September 2023 as part of the UCI ProSeries.

== Winners ==
Year	Country	Rider	Team
2010	Australia	David Kemp	Fly V Australia
2011	Russia	Boris Shpilevsky	Tabriz Petrochemical Team
2012	Czech Republic	Milan Kadlec	ASC Dukla Praha
2013	Ukraine	Yuriy Metlushenko	Torku Şeker Spor
2014	Australia	Sam Witmitz	Team Budget Forklifts
2015	Italy	Jakub Mareczko	Southeast Pro Cycling
2016	France	Leonardo Duque	Delko–Marseille Provence KTM
2017	Italy	Jakub Mareczko	Wilier Triestina–Selle Italia
2018	Belgium	Boris Vallée	Wanty–Groupe Gobert
2019	New Zealand	Dylan Kennett	St George Continental Cycling Team
2020–2022	No race		
2023	New Zealand	George Jackson	Bolton Equities Black Spoke
2024	Netherlands	Jelte Krijnsen	Parkhotel Valkenburg
2025	Italy	Matteo Malucelli	XDS Astana Team
2026	Italy	Matteo Malucelli	XDS Astana Team
