= Joshua Giddings (cyclist) =

British cyclist

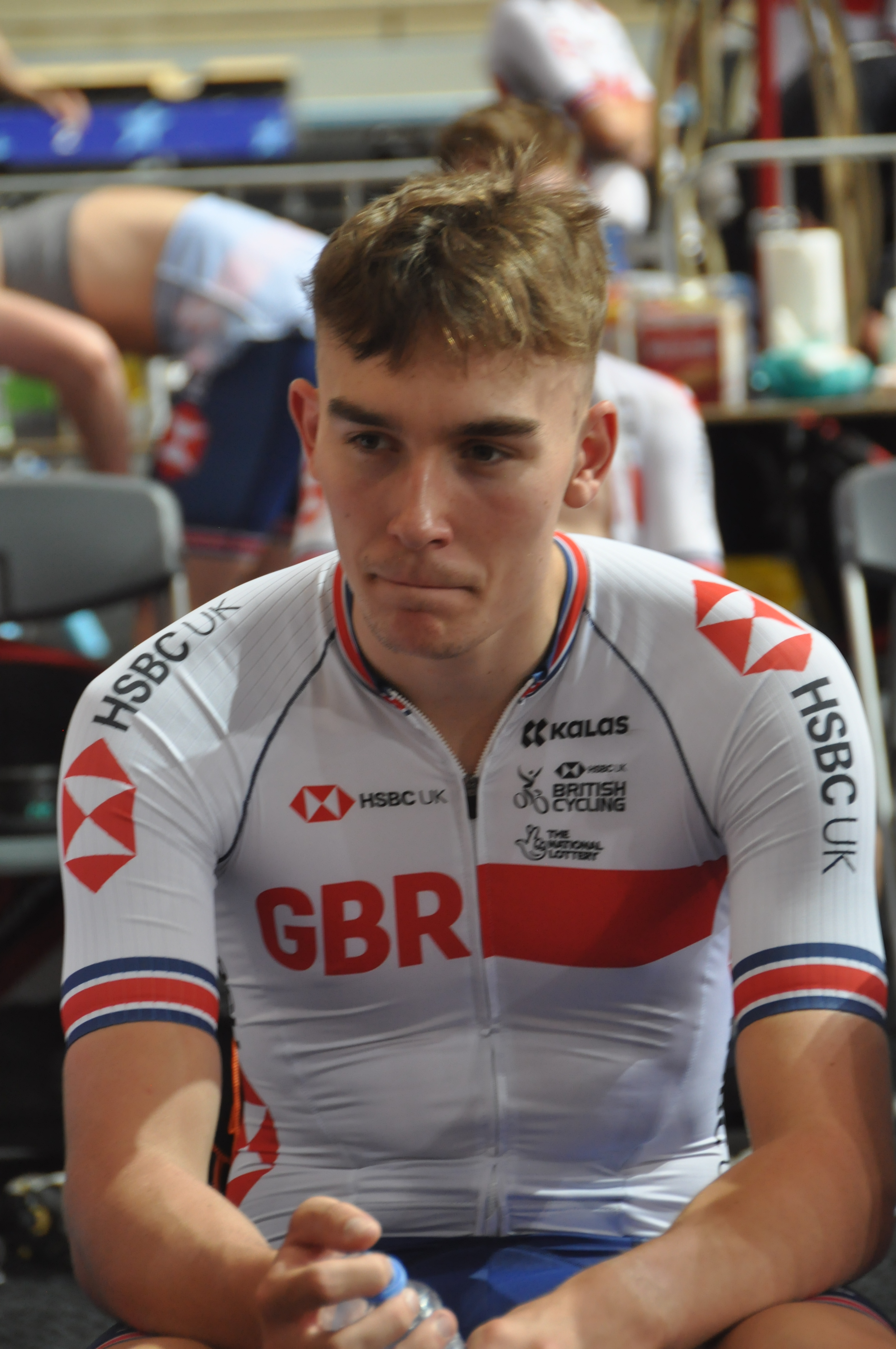
- Giddings in 2021

Personal information
- Born: 20 July 2003 (age 23) Nottingham, England
- Height: 1.95 m (6 ft 5 in)

Cycling career
- Sport: Cycling
- Current team: Lotto–Intermarché
- Discipline: Road
- Role: Rider

Amateur teams
- 2020: HMT Hospitals Giant CT
- 2021: Holdsworth Zappi Team
- 2022: Team Inspired

Professional teams
- 2023–2024: Lotto–Dstny Development Team
- 2025–: Lotto
Medal record
Representing Great Britain
Men's track cycling
European Under-23 Championships
Gold medal – first place	2023 Anadia	Team pursuit
European Junior Championships
Gold medal – first place	2021 Apeldoorn	Madison
Gold medal – first place	2021 Apeldoorn	Team pursuit

Joshua Giddings (born 20 July 2003) is a British track and road cyclist, who rides for UCI WorldTeam Lotto–Intermarché.

== Major results ==
=== Road ===
2021
1st Points classification, Junior Tour of Wales
5th Time trial, National Junior Championships
2022
5th Time trial, National Under-23 Championships
2023
1st Stage 1 (TTT) Tour Alsace
2nd Kersenronde Mierlo
2024
1st Brussels–Opwijk
4th Time trial, National Under-23 Championships
4th Omloop Het Nieuwsblad Beloften
7th Overall Olympia's Tour
10th Grand Prix de la ville de Pérenchies
2026 (1 pro win)
2nd Overall Tour of Taihu Lake

1st Young rider classification
1st Stage 1

10th Grand Prix d'Isbergues

==== Grand Tour general classification results timeline ====
Grand Tour	2026
Giro d'Italia	DNF
Tour de France	—
Vuelta a España	—

Legend
—	Did not compete
DNF	Did not finish

=== Track ===
2021
UEC European Junior Championships

1st Team pursuit
1st Madison (with Josh Charlton)

1st Madison, National Junior Championships (with Jack Brough)
2022
3rd Scratch, National Championships
2023
1st Team pursuit, UEC European Under-23 Championships
