= Gabriele Bessega =

Italian bicycle racer

Personal information
- Born: 18 February 2004 (age 22) Milan, Italy
- Height: 1.82 m (6 ft 0 in)

Cycling career
- Sport: Cycling
- Current team: Team Polti VisitMalta
- Discipline: Road
- Role: Rider

Amateur teams
- 2022: Bustese Olonia ASD
- 2023–2024: Eolo–Kometa U23
- 2025: Biesse–Carrera–Premac

Professional team
- 2026–: Team Polti VisitMalta

Gabriele Bessega (born 18 February 2004) is an Italian cyclist, who currently rides for UCI ProTeam Team Polti VisitMalta.

His twin brother Tommaso is also a cyclist for the same team.

== Major results ==
2025
6th Popolarissima
10th Trofeo Città di Brescia
2026 (1 pro win)
1st Stage 2 Tour of Magnificent Qinghai
4th Grand Prix Criquielion
