= Alexander Konychev =

Italian cyclist

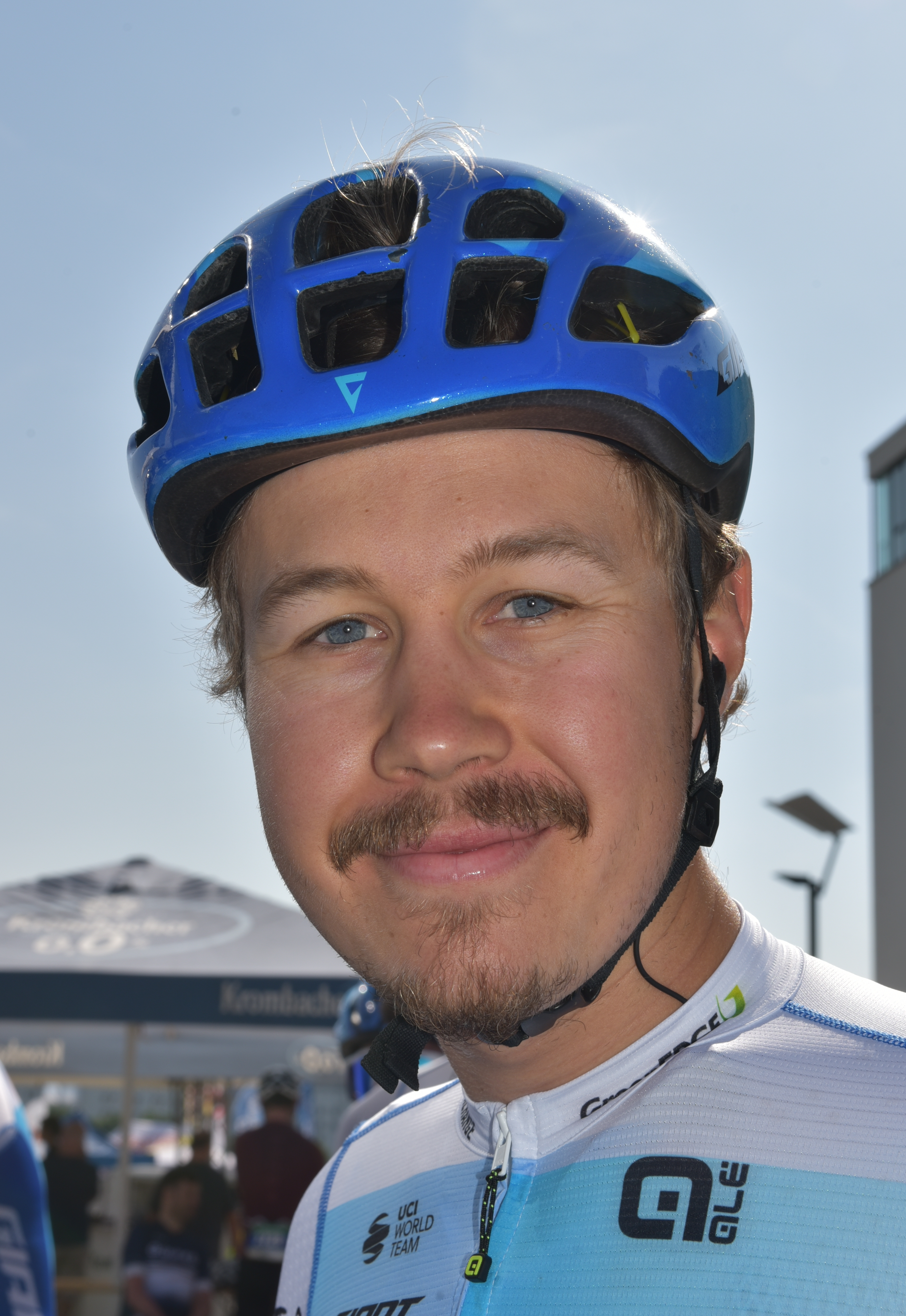
- Konychev at 2022 Rund um Köln

Personal information
- Born: 25 July 1998 (age 28) Verona, Italy
- Height: 1.85 m (6 ft 1 in)
- Weight: 76 kg (168 lb)

Cycling career
- Sport: Cycling
- Current team: Team Vorarlberg
- Discipline: Road
- Role: Rider

Amateur teams
- 2017: Viris Maserati-Sisal Chiaravalli-L&L
- 2018: Petroli Firenze-Hopplà-Maserati

Professional teams
- 2019: Dimension Data for Qhubeka
- 2019: Team Dimension Data (stagiaire)
- 2020–2022: Mitchelton–Scott
- 2023: Team Corratec
- 2024–: Team Vorarlberg

Alexander Konychev (born 25 July 1998 in Verona) is an Italian cyclist, who currently rides for UCI Continental team Team Vorarlberg.

He is the son of famous former professional cyclist Dimitri Konyshev, and was born in Italy while his father was competing for the Mercatone Uno–Bianchi team.

== Major results ==
Konychev at 2025 Tour of Romania

2016
2nd Overall Giro di Basilicata
2018
5th Road race, National Under–23 Road Championships
8th Gran Premio della Liberazione
2019
1st L'Étoile d'Or
2nd Coppa Collecchio
4th Coppa Bernocchi
5th Road race, National Under–23 Road Championships
6th Grand Prix d'Isbergues
2021
5th Road race, National Road Championships
2023
2nd Cupa Max Ausnit
2024
9th Overall Tour of Istanbul
2025
1st Overall Tour of Małopolska

1st Points classification
1st Stage 1

1st Kirschblütenrennen
2nd Radsportfest Märwil
3rd Tour de Berne

=== Grand Tour general classification results timeline ===
Grand Tour	2023	2024	2025
Giro d'Italia	100	—	—
Tour de France	—	—	
Vuelta a España	—	—	

Legend
—	Did not compete
DNF	Did not finish
