= China Anta–Mentech Cycling Team =

Chinese cycling team

Team information
- UCI code: CAT
- Registered: China
- Founded: 2021
- Discipline: Road
- Status: UCI Continental (2021–)
- Bicycles: Pardus

Key personnel
- Team manager: Amaël Moinard

Team name history
- 2021 2022–2023 2024 2025–: CFC Continental Team; China Glory Continental Cycling Team; China Glory–Mentech Continental Cycling Team; China Anta–Mentech Cycling Team

China Anta–Mentech Cycling Team (UCI team code: CAT) is a UCI Continental team, founded in 2021, that is based in Beijing, China.

== Team roster ==
As of 30 January 2024.

Rider	Date of birth
Lucas De Rossi (FRA)	16 August 1995 (age 31)
Reinardt Janse van Rensburg (RSA)	3 February 1989 (age 37)
Li Zhen (CHN)	17 July 2002 (age 24)
Lü Xianjing (CHN)	2 February 1998 (age 28)
Ma Binyan (CHN)	25 January 1999 (age 27)
Shen Yutao (CHN)	19 September 2000 (age 25)

Rider	Date of birth
Willie Smit (RSA)	29 December 1992 (age 33)
Su Haoyu (CHN)	26 October 2000 (age 25)
Sun Changsheng (CHN)	30 November 2002 (age 23)
Teng Geng (CHN)	13 February 1999 (age 27)
Julien Trarieux (FRA)	19 August 1992 (age 34)
Yu Jiaqing (CHN)	5 August 2004 (age 22)

== Major wins ==
2023
Alanya CUP, Willie Smit
Stage 3 Tour of Sakarya, Lü Xianjing
Overall Tour of Huangshan, Julien Trarieux

Stage 3, Lü Xianjing

Overall Tour of Poyang Lake, Lü Xianjing

Stage 1, Lü Xianjing

Stage 3 Tour of Hainan, James Piccoli
2024
Grand Prix Antalya Airport City, Binyan Ma
Grand Prix Apollon Temple, Binyan Ma
Tour of Alanya, Julien Trarieux
Grand Prix Syedra Ancient City, Lü Xianjing
Stage 1 Tour of Sakarya, Willie Smit
Stage 2 Tour of Sakarya, Lü Xianjing
2026
Overall Tour of Lithuania, Alexander Konychev

Stage 1, Alexander Konychev
