= 2025 Team TotalEnergies season =

Team TotalEnergies
- 2025 season
- UCI code: TEN
- Status: UCI ProTeam
- Manager: Jean-René Bernaudeau (FRA)
- Main sponsor(s): TotalEnergies
- Based: France
- Bicycles: Enve
- Groupset: Shimano

Season victories
- One-day races: 2
- Stage race overall: 1
- Stage race stages: 1
- Most wins: (France) Alexys Brunel (France) Joris Delbove (France) Fabien Doubey (France) Mattéo Vercher (1 win each)

The 2025 season for Team TotalEnergies is the 26th season in the team's existence and the 16th as a UCI ProTeam.

== Team roster ==
All ages are as of 1 January 2025, the first day of the 2025 season.

As of 9 January 2025.

Rider	Date of birth
Lucas Boniface (FRA)	24 October 2000 (aged 24)
Thomas Bonnet (FRA)	13 September 1998 (aged 26)
Rayan Boulahoite (FRA)	24 February 2004 (aged 20)
Alexys Brunel (FRA)	10 October 1998 (aged 26)
Mathieu Burgaudeau (FRA)	17 November 1998 (aged 26)
Steff Cras (BEL)	13 February 1996 (aged 28)
Florian Dauphin (FRA)	6 April 1999 (aged 25)
Joris Delbove (FRA)	15 July 2000 (aged 24)
Alexandre Delettre (FRA)	25 October 1997 (aged 27)
Fabien Doubey (FRA)	21 October 1993 (aged 31)
Sandy Dujardin (FRA)	29 May 1997 (aged 27)
Thomas Gachignard (FRA)	17 August 2000 (aged 24)
Fabien Grellier (FRA)	31 October 1994 (aged 30)

Rider	Date of birth
Emilien Jeannière (FRA)	26 September 1998 (aged 26)
Jordan Jegat (FRA)	7 June 1999 (aged 25)
Alan Jousseaume (FRA)	3 August 1998 (aged 26)
Pierre Latour (FRA)	12 October 1993 (aged 31)
Samuel Leroux (FRA)	27 September 1994 (aged 30)
Lorrenzo Manzin (FRA)	26 July 1994 (aged 30)
Nicola Marcerou (FRA)	23 September 2002 (aged 22)
Valentin Retailleau (FRA)	18 June 2000 (aged 24)
Geoffrey Soupe (FRA)	22 March 1988 (aged 36)
Jason Tesson (FRA)	9 January 1998 (aged 26)
Anthony Turgis (FRA)	16 May 1994 (aged 30)
Baptiste Vadic (FRA)	15 April 2002 (aged 22)
Mattéo Vercher (FRA)	26 January 2001 (aged 23)

Riders who joined the team for the 2025 season

Rider	2024 team
Rayan Boulahoite	Vendée U Pays de la Loire
Alexys Brunel	
Florian Dauphin	Arkéa–B&B Hôtels Continentale
Joris Delbove	St. Michel–Mavic–Auber93
Alexandre Delettre	St. Michel–Mavic–Auber93
Samuel Leroux	Van Rysel–Roubaix
Nicola Marcerou	Vendée U Pays de la Loire
Valentin Retailleau	Decathlon–AG2R La Mondiale

Riders who left the team during or after the 2024 season

Rider	2025 team
Valentin Ferron	Cofidis
Paul Ourselin	Cofidis
Julien Simon	Retired
Dries Van Gestel	Soudal–Quick-Step
Alexis Vuillermoz	Retired

== Season victories ==
Date	Race	Competition	Rider	Country	Location	Ref.
27 February	Tour du Rwanda, stage 4	UCI Africa Tour	Joris Delbove (FRA)	Rwanda	Gitesi	
2 March	Tour du Rwanda, overall	UCI Africa Tour	Fabien Doubey (FRA)	Rwanda		
9 March	Grote Prijs Jean-Pierre Monseré	UCI Europe Tour	Alexys Brunel (FRA)	Belgium	Roeselare	
20 April	Tour du Doubs	UCI Europe Tour	Mattéo Vercher (FRA)	France	Morteau	
