= 2026 Tour de Kyushu =

2026 UCI Asia Tour

Race details
- Dates: 10–12 October 2026
- Stages: 3
- Distance: 403.4 km (250.7 mi)
- Winning time: 8h 47' 36"

Results
Jersey awarded to the overall winner	Winner	Ivo Oliveira (POR)	(UAE Team Emirates XRG)
	Second	Luke Mudgway (NZL)	(Li-Ning Star)
	Third	Alexandre Delettre (FRA)	(Team TotalEnergies)
Jersey awarded to the points classification winner	Points	Ivo Oliveira (POR)	(UAE Team Emirates XRG)
Jersey awarded to the mountains classification winner	Mountains	Gerard Ledesma (ESP)	(VC Fukuoka)
Jersey awarded to the young rider classification winner	Young rider	Alessio Delle Vedove (ITA)	(XDS Astana Team)
	Team	(France) Team TotalEnergies	

The 2026 Tour de Kyushu (officially Mynavi Tour de Kyushu 2026 for sponsorship reasons) is a men's road cycling stage race which takes place from 10 to 12 September 2026 in the island of Kyushu, Japan. It is the 4th edition of the Tour de Kyushu, and is rated as a 2.1 event on the 2026 UCI Asia Tour calendar.

== Teams ==
Two UCI WorldTeams, two UCI ProTeams, thirteen UCI Continental teams and one national team made up the eighteen teams that will participate in the race.

UCI WorldTeams

- UAE Team Emirates XRG
- XDS Astana Team

UCI ProTeams

- Solution Tech NIPPO Rali
- Team TotalEnergies

UCI Continental Teams

- Aisan Racing Team
- Astemo Utsunomiya Blitzen
- CCACHE x BODYWRAP
- Kinan Racing Team
- Li-Ning Star
- Roojai Insurance Winspace
- Shimano Racing Team
- Sparkle Oita Racing Team
- Team UKYO
- Terengganu Cycling Team
- VC Fukuoka
- Victoire Hiroshima
- Victoria Sports Pro Cycling

National Teams

- Japan

== Schedule ==
Stage characteristics and winners
Stage	Date	Route	Distance	Type	Stage winner
1	10 October	Saga to Fukuoka	152 km (94 mi)	Hilly stage	Matteo Malucelli (ITA)
2	11 October	Ōita to Kumamoto	127.8 km (79.4 mi)	Mountain stage	Ivo Oliveira (POR)
3	12 October	Miyazaki to Miyazaki	123.6 km (76.8 mi)	Hilly stage	Ivo Oliveira (POR)
Total			403.4 km (250.7 mi)		

== Stages ==
=== Stage 1 ===
10 October 2026 – Saga to Fukuoka, 152 km (94 mi)

Stage 1 Result
Rank	Rider	Team	Time
1	Matteo Malucelli (ITA)	XDS Astana Team	3h 09' 51"
2	Luke Mudgway (NZL)	Li-Ning Star	+ 0"
3	Alessio Delle Vedove (ITA)	XDS Astana Team	+ 0"
4	Davide Stella (ITA)	UAE Team Emirates XRG	+ 0"
5	Lucas Carstensen (GER)	Kinan Racing Team	+ 0"
6	Haruhi Honda (JPN)	VC Fukuoka	+ 0"
7	Thomas Bonnet (FRA)	Team TotalEnergies	+ 0"
8	Atsushi Oka (JPN)	Astemo Utsunomiya Blitzen	+ 0"
9	Nikiforos Arvanitou (GRE)	XDS Astana Team	+ 0"
10	Jeroen Meijers (NED)	Victoria Sports Pro Cycling	+ 0"

General classification after Stage 1
Rank	Rider	Team	Time
1	Matteo Malucelli (ITA)	XDS Astana Team	3h 09' 41"
2	Luke Mudgway (NZL)	Li-Ning Star	+ 2"
3	Ivo Oliveira (POR)	UAE Team Emirates XRG	+ 4"
4	Alessio Delle Vedove (ITA)	XDS Astana Team	+ 6"
5	Mathias Bregnhøj (DEN)	Terengganu Cycling Team	+ 7"
6	Tommaso Dati (ITA)	Team UKYO	+ 8"
7	Ben Granger (GBR)	Solution Tech NIPPO Rali	+ 9"
8	Jordan Jegat (FRA)	Team TotalEnergies	+ 9"
9	Davide Stella (ITA)	UAE Team Emirates XRG	+ 10"
10	Lucas Carstensen (GER)	Kinan Racing Team	+ 10"

=== Stage 2 ===
11 October 2026 – Ōita to Kumamoto, 127.8 km (79.4 mi)

Stage 2 Result
Rank	Rider	Team	Time
1	Ivo Oliveira (POR)	UAE Team Emirates XRG	3h 03' 31"
2	William Heffernan (AUS)	CCACHE x BODYWRAP	+ 0"
3	Luke Mudgway (NZL)	Li-Ning Star	+ 0"
4	Benjamín Prades (ESP)	VC Fukuoka	+ 0"
5	Jordan Jegat (FRA)	Team TotalEnergies	+ 0"
6	Nicolò Garibbo (ITA)	Team UKYO	+ 0"
7	Federico Iacomoni (ITA)	Team UKYO	+ 0"
8	Alexandre Balmer (SUI)	Solution Tech NIPPO Rali	+ 1"
9	Hayato Okamoto (JPN)	Aisan Racing Team	+ 1"
10	Tommaso Dati (ITA)	Team UKYO	+ 1"

General classification after Stage 2
Rank	Rider	Team	Time
1	Ivo Oliveira (POR)	UAE Team Emirates XRG	6h 13' 03"
2	Luke Mudgway (NZL)	Li-Ning Star	+ 7"
3	William Heffernan (AUS)	CCACHE x BODYWRAP	+ 9"
4	Gerard Ledesma (ESP)	VC Fukuoka	+ 14"
5	Alessio Delle Vedove (ITA)	XDS Astana Team	+ 15"
6	Jordan Jegat (FRA)	Team TotalEnergies	+ 16"
7	Mathias Bregnhøj (DEN)	Terengganu Cycling Team	+ 16"
8	Tommaso Dati (ITA)	Team UKYO	+ 17"
9	Matteo Regnanti (ITA)	Solution Tech NIPPO Rali	+ 18"
10	Ben Granger (GBR)	Solution Tech NIPPO Rali	+ 18"

=== Stage 3 ===
12 October 2026 – Miyazaki to Miyazaki, 123.6 km (76.8 mi)

Stage 3 Result
Rank	Rider	Team	Time
1	Ivo Oliveira (POR)	UAE Team Emirates XRG	2h 34' 46"
2	Alexandre Delettre (FRA)	Team TotalEnergies	+ 0"
3	Luke Mudgway (NZL)	Li-Ning Star	+ 0"
4	Matteo Regnanti (ITA)	Solution Tech NIPPO Rali	+ 0"
5	Alessio Delle Vedove (ITA)	XDS Astana Team	+ 0"
6	Atsushi Oka (JPN)	Astemo Utsunomiya Blitzen	+ 0"
7	Eduardo Sepulveda (ARG)	Li-Ning Star	+ 0"
8	Baptiste Vadic (FRA)	Team TotalEnergies	+ 0"
9	Jordan Jegat (FRA)	Team TotalEnergies	+ 0"
10	Ben Granger (GBR)	Solution Tech NIPPO Rali	+ 0"

Final general classification
Rank	Rider	Team	Time
1	Ivo Oliveira (POR)	UAE Team Emirates XRG	8h 47' 36"
2	Luke Mudgway (NZL)	Li-Ning Star	+ 16"
3	Alexandre Delettre (FRA)	Team TotalEnergies	+ 26"
4	Alessio Delle Vedove (ITA)	XDS Astana Team	+ 26"
5	Alessandro Iacchi (ITA)	Solution Tech NIPPO Rali	+28"
6	Jordan Jegat (FRA)	Team TotalEnergies	+ 29"
7	Mathias Bregnhøj (DEN)	Terengganu Cycling Team	+ 29"
8	Yuma Koishi (JPN)	Kinan Racing Team	+ 30"
9	Matteo Regnanti (ITA)	Solution Tech NIPPO Rali	+ 31"
10	Ben Granger (GBR)	Solution Tech NIPPO Rali	+ 31"

== Classification leadership table ==
Classification leadership by stage
Stage	Winner	General classification	Points classification	Mountains classification	Young rider classification	Most combative rider	Best Japanese rider	Team classification
1	Matteo Malucelli	Matteo Malucelli	Matteo Malucelli (Note: On stage 2, Luke Mudgway, who was second in the points classification, wore the red jersey, because first-placed Matteo Malucelli wore the blue jersey as the leader of the general classification.)	Ivo Oliveira	Alessio Delle Vedove	Mathias Bregnhøj	Haruhi Honda	XDS Astana Team
2	Ivo Oliveira	Ivo Oliveira	Luke Mudgway	Gerard Ledesma	William Heffernan	Adne van Engelen	Hayato Okamoto	XDS Astana Team
3	Ivo Oliveira	Ivo Oliveira	Ivo Oliveira	Gerard Ledesma	Alessio Delle Vedove	Jordan Jegat	Atsushi Oka	Team TotalEnergies
Final		Ivo Oliveira	Ivo Oliveira	Gerard Ledesma	Alessio Delle Vedove			Team TotalEnergies

== Classification standings ==
Legend
Denotes the winner of the general classification	Denotes the winner of the mountains classification
Denotes the winner of the points classification	Denotes the winner of the young rider classification

=== General classification ===
Final general classification (1–10)
Rank	Rider	Team	Time
1	Ivo Oliveira (POR)	UAE Team Emirates XRG	8h 47' 36"
2	Luke Mudgway (NZL)	Li-Ning Star	+ 16"
3	Alexandre Delettre (FRA)	Team TotalEnergies	+ 26"
4	Alessio Delle Vedove (ITA)	XDS Astana Team	+ 26"
5	Alessandro Iacchi (ITA)	Solution Tech NIPPO Rali	+ 28"
6	Jordan Jegat (FRA)	Team TotalEnergies	+ 29"
7	Mathias Bregnhøj (DEN)	Terengganu Cycling Team	+ 29"
8	Yuma Koishi (JPN)	Kinan Racing Team	+ 30"
9	Matteo Regnanti (ITA)	Solution Tech NIPPO Rali	+ 32"
10	Ben Granger (GBR)	Solution Tech NIPPO Rali	+ 32"

=== Points classification ===
Final points classification (1–10)
Rank	Rider	Team	Points
1	Ivo Oliveira (POR)	UAE Team Emirates XRG	64
2	Luke Mudgway (NZL)	Li-Ning Star	54
3	Alessio Delle Vedove (ITA)	XDS Astana Team	30
4	Alexandre Delettre (FRA)	Team TotalEnergies	26
5	William Heffernan (AUS)	CCACHE x BODYWRAP	24
6	Jordan Jegat (FRA)	Team TotalEnergies	22
7	Atsushi Oka (JPN)	Astemo Utsunomiya Blitzen	18
8	Matteo Regnanti (ITA)	Solution Tech NIPPO Rali	15
9	Benjamín Prades (ESP)	VC Fukuoka	14
10	Davide Stella (ITA)	UAE Team Emirates XRG	14

=== Mountains classification ===
Final mountains classification (1-10)
Rank	Rider	Team	Points
1	Gerard Ledesma (ESP)	VC Fukuoka	29
2	Adne van Engelen (NED)	Terengganu Cycling Team	27
3	Jordan Jegat (FRA)	Team TotalEnergies	22
4	Yun Jaebin (KOR)	Roojai Insurance Winspace	18
5	Ivo Oliveira (POR)	UAE Team Emirates XRG	13
6	Marco Schrettl (AUT)	XDS Astana Team	12
7	Nils Sinschek (NED)	Li-Ning Star	12
8	William Heffernan (AUS)	CCACHE x BODYWRAP	12
9	Federico Iacomoni (ITA)	Team UKYO	9
10	Baptiste Vadic (FRA)	Team TotalEnergies	8

=== Young rider classification ===
Final young rider classification (1–10)
Rank	Rider	Team	Time
1	Alessio Delle Vedove (ITA)	XDS Astana Team	8h 48' 02"
2	Ludovico Mellano (ITA)	XDS Astana Team	+ 6"
3	William Heffernan (AUS)	CCACHE x BODYWRAP	+ 3' 33"
4	Masao Shimazaki (JPN)	Japan	+ 3' 52"
5	Koki Kamada (JPN)	Solution Tech NIPPO Rali	+ 5' 12"
6	Zenshin Nozaki (JPN)	Japan	+ 5' 28"
7	Adrià Pericas (ESP)	UAE Team Emirates XRG	+ 9' 17"
8	Enea Sambinello (ITA)	UAE Team Emirates XRG	+ 10' 51"
9	George Matsui (JPN)	Aisan Racing Team	+ 11' 16"
10	Gen Abe (JPN)	VC Fukuoka	+ 14' 43"

=== Team classification ===
Final team classification (1–10)
Rank	Team	Time
1	(France) Team TotalEnergies	26h 24' 24"
2	(Italy) Solution Tech NIPPO Rali	+ 0"
3	(Kazakhstan) XDS Astana Team	+ 5"
4	(China) Li-Ning Star	+ 1' 58"
5	(Japan) Kinan Racing Team	+ 5' 43"
6	(Japan) VC Fukuoka	+ 8' 48"
7	(United Arab Emirates) UAE Team Emirates XRG	+ 9' 11"
8	(Malaysia) Terengganu Cycling Team	+ 13' 08"
9	(Thailand) Roojai Insurance Winspace	+ 14' 18"
10	(Japan) Team UKYO	+ 15' 24"
