= 2025 Israel–Premier Tech season =

Israel–Premier Tech
- 2025 season
- UCI code: IPT
- Status: UCI ProTeam
- Manager: Kjell Carlström (FIN)
- Main sponsor(s): Start-Up Nation Central; Premier Tech
- Based: Israel
- Bicycles: Factor
- Groupset: Shimano

Season victories
- Stage race overall: 2
- Stage race stages: 7
- Most wins: (Australia) Brady Gilmore (4)

The 2025 cycling season for Israel–Premier Tech is the team's third season as a UCI ProTeam after its relegation after the 2022 season and its eleventh season overall.

== Roster ==
All ages are as of 1 January 2025, the first day of the 2025 season.

As of 7 January 2025.

Rider	Date of birth
Pascal Ackermann (GER)	17 January 1994 (aged 30)
George Bennett (NZL)	7 April 1990 (aged 34)
Joseph Blackmore (GBR)	23 February 2003 (aged 21)
Guillaume Boivin (CAN)	25 May 1989 (aged 35)
Simon Clarke (AUS)	18 July 1986 (aged 38)
Pier-André Côté (CAN)	24 April 1997 (aged 27)
Itamar Einhorn (ISR)	20 September 1997 (aged 27)
Marco Frigo (ITA)	2 March 2000 (aged 24)
Chris Froome (GBR)	20 May 1985 (aged 39)
Jakob Fuglsang (DEN)	22 March 1985 (aged 39)
Derek Gee (CAN)	3 August 1997 (aged 27)
Jan Hirt (CZE)	21 January 1991 (aged 33)
Hugo Hofstetter (FRA)	13 February 1994 (aged 30)
Hugo Houle (CAN)	27 September 1990 (aged 34)
Oded Kogut (ISR)	14 February 2001 (aged 23)

Rider	Date of birth
Matis Louvel (FRA)	19 July 1999 (aged 25)
Alexey Lutsenko (KAZ)	7 September 1992 (aged 32)
Krists Neilands (LAT)	18 August 1994 (aged 30)
Riley Pickrell (CAN)	16 August 2001 (aged 23)
Nadav Raisberg (ISR)	29 March 2001 (aged 23)
Matthew Riccitello (USA)	5 March 2002 (aged 22)
Nick Schultz (AUS)	13 September 1994 (aged 30)
Michael Schwarzmann (GER)	7 January 1991 (aged 33)
Riley Sheehan (USA)	16 June 2000 (aged 24)
Jake Stewart (GBR)	2 October 1999 (aged 25)
Corbin Strong (NZL)	30 April 2000 (aged 24)
Tom Van Asbroeck (BEL)	19 April 1990 (aged 34)
Ethan Vernon (GBR)	26 August 2000 (aged 24)
Stephen Williams (GBR)	9 June 1996 (aged 28)
Michael Woods (CAN)	12 October 1986 (aged 38)

== Season victories ==
Date	Race	Competition	Rider	Country	Location	Ref.
25 February	Tour du Rwanda, stage 2	UCI Africa Tour	Brady Gilmore (AUS)	Rwanda	Musanze	
26 February	Tour du Rwanda, stage 3	UCI Africa Tour	Brady Gilmore (AUS)	Rwanda	Gisenyi	
28 February	O Gran Camiño, stage 3 (ITT)	UCI Europe Tour	Derek Gee (CAN)	Spain	O Pereiro de Aguiar	
2 March	O Gran Camiño, overall	UCI Europe Tour	Derek Gee (CAN)	Spain		
17 March	Tour de Taiwan, stage 2	UCI Asia Tour	Brady Gilmore (AUS)	Taiwan	Green Pond Park	
19 March	Tour de Taiwan, stage 4	UCI Asia Tour	Itamar Einhorn (ISR)	Taiwan	Kaohsiung	
20 March	Tour de Taiwan, overall	UCI Asia Tour	Brady Gilmore (AUS)	Taiwan		
25 March	Volta a Catalunya, stage 2	UCI World Tour	Ethan Vernon (GBR)	Spain	Figueres	
23 April	Tour of the Alps, stage 3	UCI ProSeries	Marco Frigo (ITA)	Italy	Innichen	

== National, Continental, and World Champions ==
Date	Discipline	Jersey	Rider	Country	Location	Ref.
