= List of Shimano groupsets =

Shimano offers groupsets for road and mountain bicycles, among others.

== Road groupsets ==
Current list of road bike groupsets in order of descending tiers:

- Dura-Ace
- Ultegra
- 105
- Tiagra
- CUES (new standard that replaces Sora and Claris)
- Sora (being phased out with CUES)
- Claris (being phased out with CUES)
- Essa
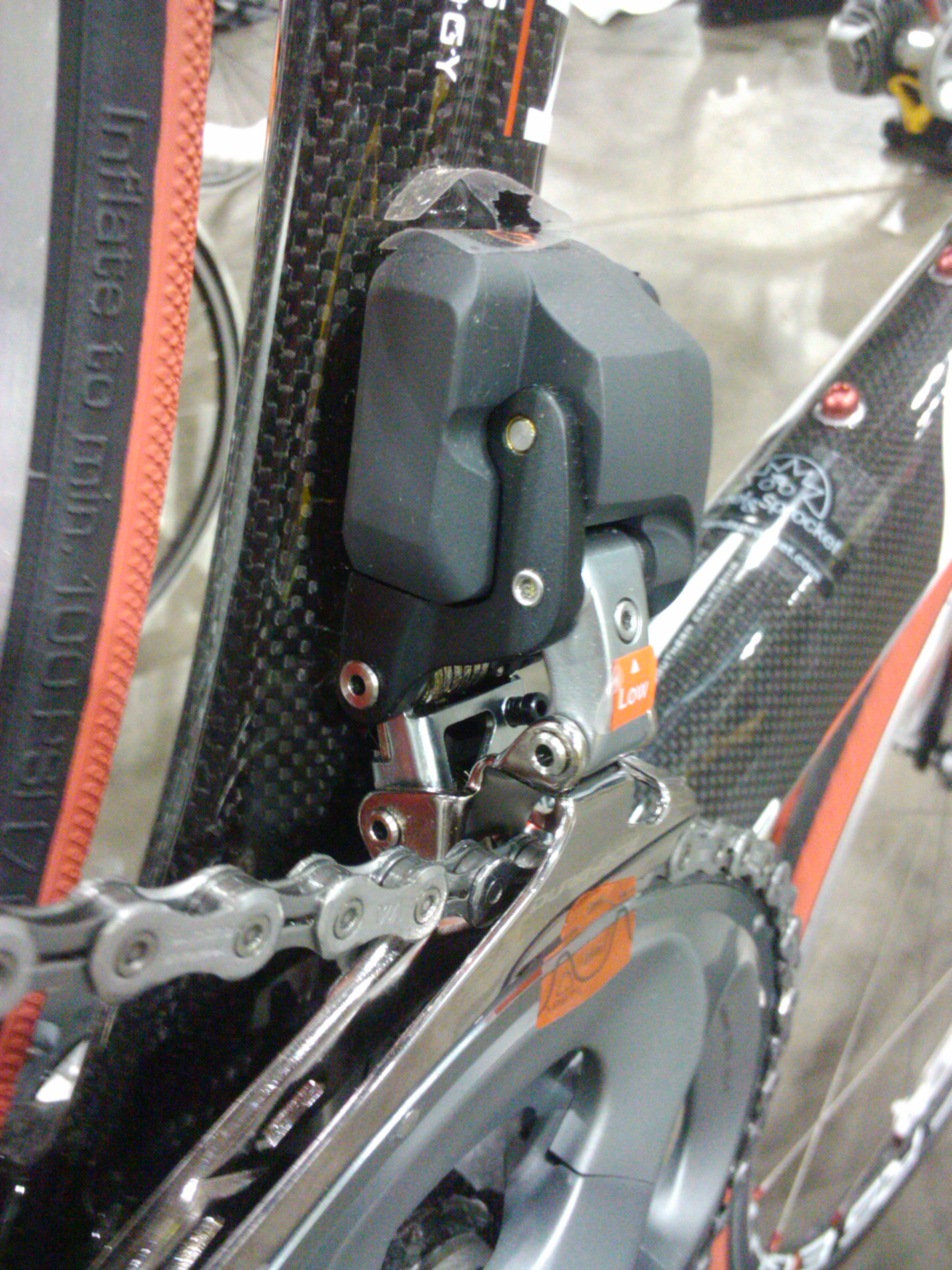
Di2 electronic front derailleur

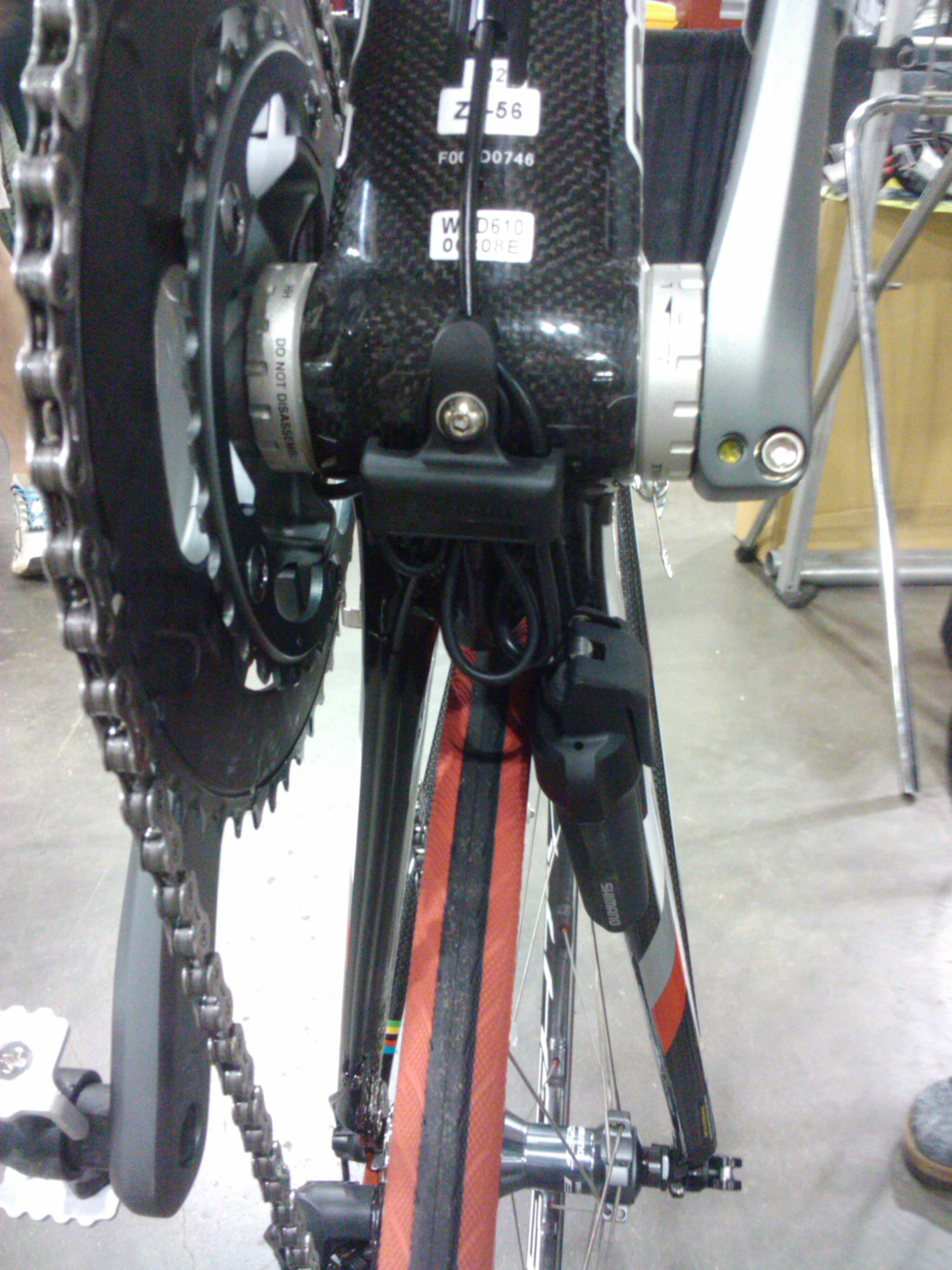
Di2 electronic shifting control unit and battery pack mounted to bottom of bottom bracket and left chainstay. Hollowtech II external bearing cups are also visible, between the crank arms and the bottom bracket shell.

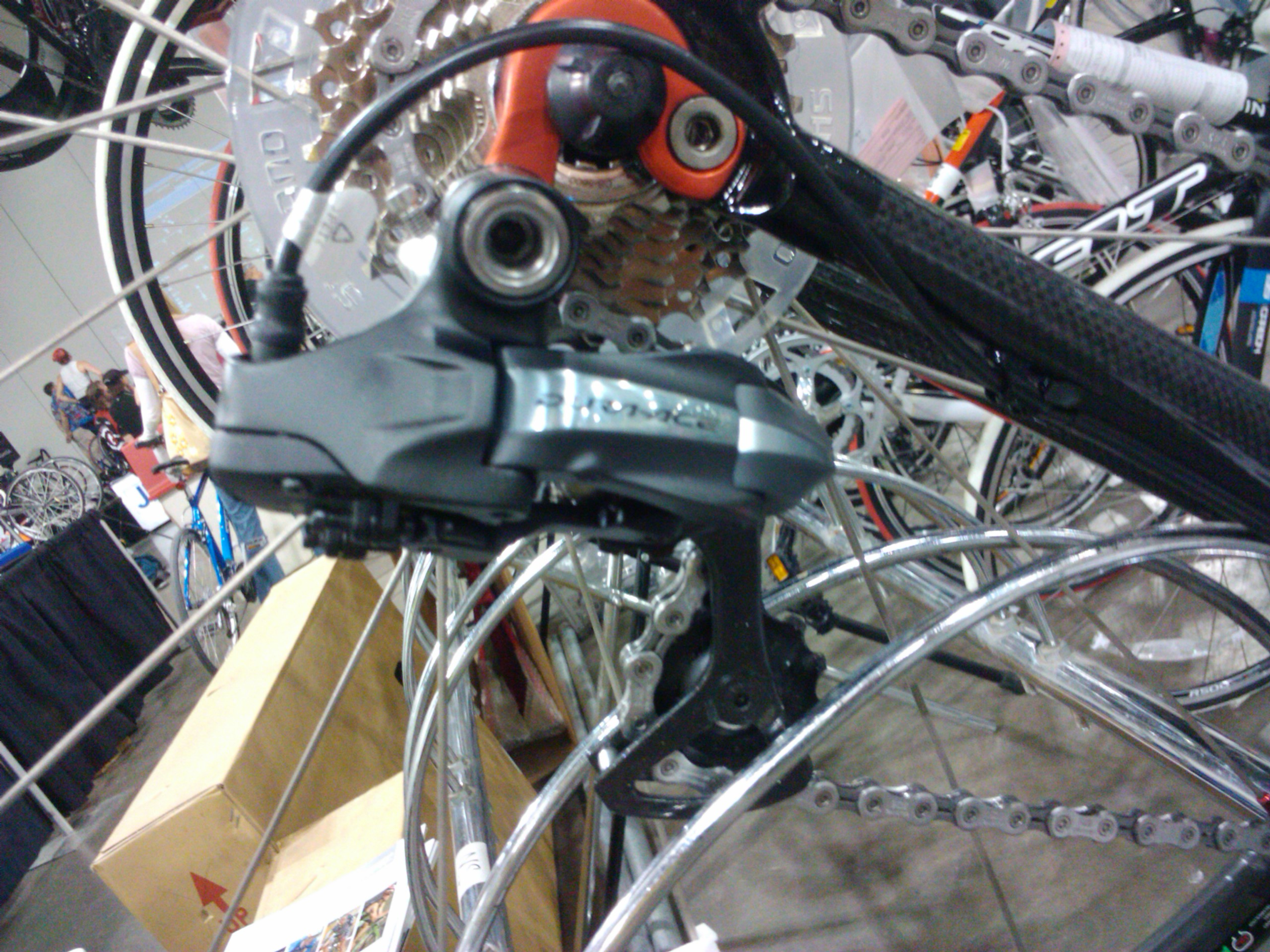
Di2 electronic rear derailleur

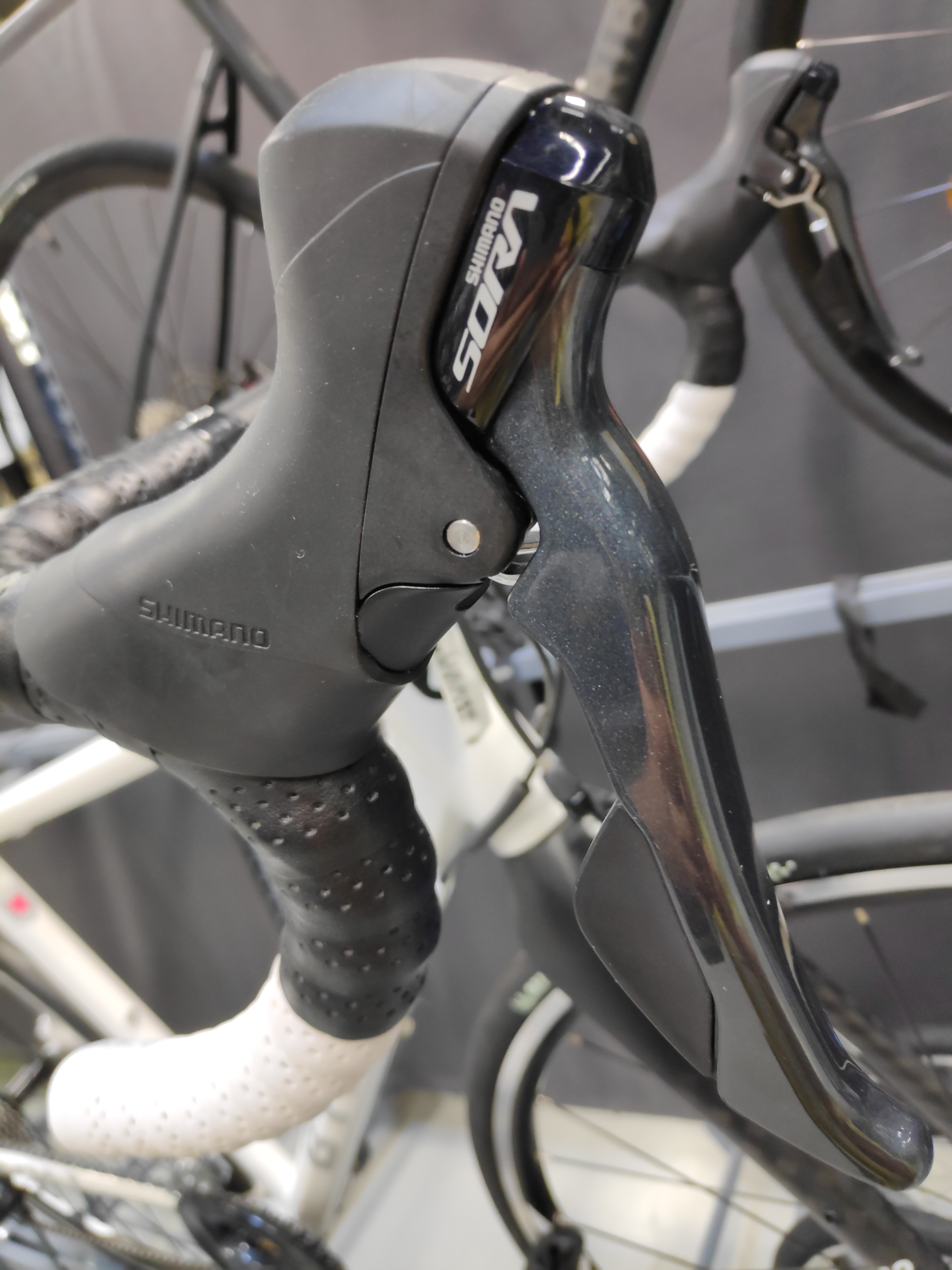
Shimano Sora (R3000) shift lever

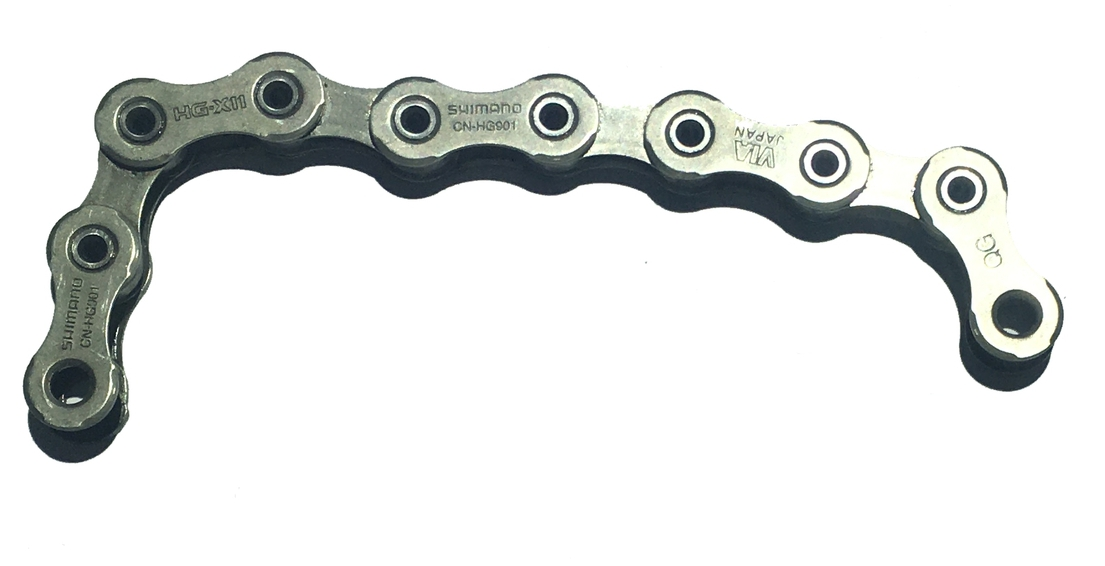
Shimano Dura-Ace chain segment

Groupset	Dura-Ace	Ultegra	105	Tiagra	Sora	Claris
1973	'Dura-Ace' introduction (used 'Crane' rear derailleur) No series number					
1974		Shimano-600				
1975						
1976	Dura-Ace 10 track (later 7000)					
1977						
1978	Dura-Ace EX (no more 'Crane' RD) - 7200 name added later	600 EX ('Arabesque') - 6200 name added later				
1979						
1980	Dura-Ace AX (7300) - 'aerodynamic' sold alongside EX					
1981		600 AX (6300) 'aerodynamic' sold alongside EX				
1982						
1983		600 EX (6207)	105 'Golden Arrow'			
1984	7400 : 6-speed and SIS					
1985	7600 : track					
1986		600 EX (6208) : 6-speed SIS				
1987	7401 : 7-speed		1050 : 6.speed			
1988	7402 : 8-speed	600 Ultegra 'Tricolor' (6400) : 7-speed SIS				
1989			updated for 7-speed (RD-1051, SL-1051)			
1990	7403 : STI levers		1055: renamed to 105SC 7-speed	RX100 (A550) : 7-speed	Exage 500EX (A500) : 7-speed	Exage 400EX (A400), 300EX (A400) : 7-speed
1991						
1992		600 Ultegra (6402) : 8-speed SIS and STI levers				
1993	FC-7410 low profile crankset FD-7410 front derailleur		105SC : 8-speed		(discontinued)	(discontinued)
1994				RX100 (A551) : 8-speed		
1995					RSX (A410) : 7-speed	Exage 300EX re-release
1996	7700 : 9-speed					
1997		6500 : Name shortened to just Ultegra : 9-speed				
1998	25th Anniversary Groupset					
1999			5500 : 9-speed		RSX (A416): 8-speed	
2000						
2001				4400 : 9-speed		
2002					3300 : 8-speed	
2003	7800 : 10-speed					2200
2004						
2005		6600 : 10-speed				
2006			5600 : 10-speed	4500 : 9-speed		
2007						
2008	7900 : 10-speed				3400 : 9-speed	
2009	7970 : 10-speed Di2	6700 : 10-speed				2300 : 8-speed
2010			5700 : 10-speed			
2011		6770 : 10-speed Di2		4600 : 10-speed		
2012	9000 : 11-speed 9070 : 11-speed Di2				3500 : 9-speed with STI	
2013		6800 : 11-speed				2400 : 8-speed
2014		6870 : 11-speed Di2	5800 : 11-speed			
2015				4700 : 10-speed		
2016	R9100 : 11-speed R9120 : 11-speed, hydraulic brakes R9150 : 11-speed Di2; R9170 : 11-speed Di2, hydraulic brakes				R3000 : 9-speed internal cable routing	
2017		R8000 : 11-speed R8020 : 11-speed, hydraulic brakes R8050 : 11-speed Di2; R8070 : 11-speed Di2, hydraulic brakes				R2000 : 8-speed internal cable routing
2018			R7000 : 11-speed R7020 : 11-speed, hydraulic brakes			
2019				4720 : 10-speed, hydraulic brakes		
2020						
2021	R9250 : 12-speed Di2; R9270 : 12-speed Di2, hydraulic brakes	R8150 : 12-speed Di2; R8170 : 12-speed Di2, hydraulic brakes				
2022			R7150 : 12-speed Di2, hydraulic brakes			
2023			R7100 : 12-speed, hydraulic brakes			
2024						
2025						
2026				R4000 : 11-speed, hydraulic brakes		

== Mountain groupsets ==
The first Shimano MTB groupset was Deore XT in 1983. It was based on a 1981 Deore derailleur built for touring.

Current list of mountain bike groupsets in order of descending tiers:

- Saint (Gravity-focused)
- XTR
- Deore XT
- SLX
- Deore
- CUES (new standard that replaces Alivio, Acera, Altus, and parts of Deore)
- Alivio (being phased out with CUES)
- Acera (being phased out with CUES)
- Altus (being phased out with CUES)
- Essa

Mountain bike groupsets include:

groupset	XTR	Saint	Deore XT	SLX	Cues	Deore	Alivio	Acera	Altus	Essa
1983			M700: 6-speed							
1984										
1985										
1986										
1987			M730: indexed 6-speed			MT60: 6-speed				
1988										
1989			M732: 7-speed	MT62: 7.speed (Deore II)		M500: 7-speed (Mountain LX)	M450: 6-speed (Exage Mountain)	M350: 6-speed (Exage Trail)	M250: 6-speed (Exage Country)	
1990			M735: 7-speed Rapidfire	M650/550: 7-speed (Deore DX/Deore LX)		500LX: 7-speed (Exage)	400LX: 7-speed (Exage)	300LX: 7-speed (Exage)	200GS: 7-speed	
1991										
1992	M900: 8-speed rapidfire+									
1993				M560: 7-speed (Deore LX)		M520: 7-speed (Exage ES)	(discontinued)	M320: 7-speed (Exage LT)	A10, A20, C10: 7-speed C20: 6-speed	
1994			M737: 8-speed			MC30/31: 7-speed (STX/STX-SE)	MC10/MC11: 7-speed (Alivio)	(discontinued)	C50: 6-speed	
1995	M910: 8-speed			M565: 8-speed (Deore LX)		MC32/MC33: 7-speed (STX/STX-RC)	MC12: 7-speed	M290: 7-speed (Acera-X)	C90: 7-speed	
1996	M950: 8-speed		M739: 8-speed	M567: 8-speed (Deore LX)		MC34/MC36: 7-speed (STX/STX-RC)	MC14: 7-speed			
1997				M569: 8-speed (Deore LX)		MC37/MC38: 7/8-speed (STX/STX-RC)	MC16: 7-speed		CT92: 7-speed	
1998	M951: 8-speed							M291: 7-speed (Acera X)		
1999	M952: 9-speed		M750: 9-speed	M570: 9-speed (Deore LX)			MC18: 8-speed	M330: 8-speed		
2000						M510: 9-speed (Deore)	MC20: 8-speed			
2001										
2002								M340: 8-speed	CT95: 8-speed	
2003	M960: 9-speed	M800: 9-speed	M760: 9-speed							
2004				M580: 9-speed (Deore LX)						
2005						M530: 9-speed	M410: 8-speed			
2006	M970: 9-speed	M801: 9-speed								
2007			M770: 9-speed						M310: 8-speed	
2008		M810: 9-speed		M660/T660: 9-speed (SLX/Deore LX)				M360: 8-speed		
2009						M590: 9-speed				
2010	M980: 10-speed		M773: 10-speed	M663: 10-speed			M430: 9-speed			
2011	M985: 10-speed		M780/T780: 10-speed			M593: 10-speed		M390: 9-speed		
2012	M986: 10-speed	M820: 10-speed	M781/786: 10-speed	M670/T670: 10-speed (SLX/Deore LX)						
2013						M610/T610: 10-speed			M370: 9-speed	
2014	M9000: 11-speed M9050: 11-speed Di2						M4000/T4000: 9-speed			
2015			M8000: 11-speed					M3000/T3000: 9-speed		
2016			T8000: 10-speed M8050: 11-speed Di2	M7000: 11-speed						
2017						M6000/T6000: 10-speed			M2000: 9-speed	
2018	M9100: 12-speed New Freehub									
2019			M8100: 12-speed	M7100: 12-speed						
2020						M6100: 12-speed M5100: 11-speed M4100: 10-speed	M3100: 9-speed			
2021										
2022										
2023			M8150: 12-speed Di2 for eMTB		U8000: 11-speed U6000: 10-speed U4000: 9-speed					
2024										U2000: 8-speed
2025	M9250: 12s Wireless Di2 with 9T cog		M8250: 12s Wireless Di2 with 9T cog			M6250: 12s Wireless Di2				
2026			M8200: 12s with 9T cog	M7200: 12s		M6200: 12s				

== Gravel groupsets ==
GRX was launched in 2019 as a line of gravel cycling specific groupsets intended to be compatible with road groupsets and mountain cassettes. All GRX brakes are hydraulic disc.

groupset	RX8xx	RX7xx	RX6xx	RX4xx	spec.
2018	RX800: 2×11-speed (road cassette); RX805: 2×11-speed Di2 (road cassette)				
2019	RX810: 2×11-speed (road cassette); RX812: 1×11-speed RX815: 2×11-speed Di2 (road cassette); RX817: 1×11-speed Di2		RX600-1: 1×11-speed RX600-11: 2×11-speed RX600-10: 2×10-speed	RX400: 2×10-speed	
2023	RX820: 2×12-speed (road cassette); RX822: 1×12-speed		RX610-2: 2×12-speed RX610-1: 1×12-speed		
2024	RX825: 2×12-speed Wired+Wireless Di2 (road cassette)			RX410: 2×10-speed	
2025	RX827: 1×12-speed Wireless only Di2	RX717: 1×12-speed Wireless only Di2			

== Other groupsets ==
Other current and previous groupsets include:

- Capreo [F700] – Groupset designed for small-wheeled bikes such as folders and features a cassette with a 9-tooth sprocket.
- DXR [MX70] – Performance BMX racing component.
- Nexave [C810] – Several sub-groupsets are designed for comfort and commuting bikes, some of which feature internal hub gears and roller brakes.
- Tourney - Lowest-end groupset, a mix of inexpensive components including 6-, 7- and 8-speed.
- Zee [M640] - Lower-priced version of Saint, SLX-performance level.

Groupsets no longer offered include:

- 70GS and 100GS - budget groupsets in 1990-1992
- Exage Action, Exage Sport, Exage Motion - 1988 (Shimano A450)
- Hone (M600 : 9-speed) – discontinued in 2008
- Metrea [U5000] – Groupset designed for urban riding, promising reliable performance with clean, simplistic design. Introduced in 2015 and discontinued in 2020.
- RSX -1995 (Shimano A410) Positioned below RX100. Replaced by Sora.
- RX100 - 1990 (Shimano A550) Comparable to Tiagra
- Santé - 1987 (Shimano 5000 : 7-speed) Positioned between Dura Ace and Ultegra 600. Characterized by white paint scheme.
