= 2026 UCI Asia Tour =

Sports season

- Twenty-second edition of the UCI Asia Tour

Details
- Dates: 9 November 2025 – 19 October 2026
- Location: Asia
- Races: 29

The 2026 UCI Asia Tour is the 22nd season of the UCI Asia Tour. The season began on 9 November 2025 with the Tour de Okinawa in Japan and will end in 12 October 2026 with the Tour de Kyushu. There were returning races previously not in 2025 such as Tour de Korea and Hong Kong Cyclothon, new races such as Pune Grand Tour, while some races were demoted from UCI ProSeries such as Tour of Taihu Lake. There are also races in 2025 not returning to the 2026 season, like The Road Race Tokyo Tama, while 2025 races such as AlUla Tour were upgraded to UCI ProSeries.

The points leader, based on the cumulative results of previous races, wears the UCI Asia Tour cycling jersey.

Throughout the season, points are awarded to the top finishers of stages within stage races and the final general classification standings of each of the stages races and one-day events. The quality and complexity of a race also determines how many points are awarded to the top finishers, the higher the UCI rating of a race, the more points are awarded.

The UCI race classifications from highest to lowest are as follows:

- Multi-day events: 2.1 and 2.2
- One-day events: 1.1 and 1.2

== Events ==
Races in the 2026 UCI Asia Tour
Race	Rating	Date	Winner	Team	Ref
(Japan) Tour de Okinawa	1.2	9 November 2025	Atsushi Oka (JPN)	Astemo Utsunomiya Blitzen	
(India) Pune Grand Tour	2.2	19–23 January 2026	Luke Mudgway (NZL)	Li-Ning Star	
(United Arab Emirates) Tour of Sharjah	2.2	23–27 January 2026	Rein Taaramäe (EST)	Kinan Racing Team	
(Philippines) Tour de Filipinas	2.2	19–21 February 2026	Cancelled		
(Chinese Taipei) Tour de Taiwan	2.1	15–19 March 2026	Matys Grisel (FRA)	Lotto–Intermarché	
Tour of Thailand	2.1	24–29 March 2026	Vadim Pronskiy (KAZ)	Terengganu Cycling Team	
(Uzbekistan) Grand Prix Fergana	2.2	20–21 April 2026	Nikita Tsvetkov (UZB)	Uzbekistan (national team)	
(Uzbekistan) Tour of Bostonliq	2.2	28–29 April 2026	Calum Johnston (GBR)	Li-Ning Star	
(Japan) Tour de Kumano	2.2	7–10 May 2026	Luke Burns (AUS)	Victoire Hiroshima	
(China) Yellow River Estuary Road Cycling Race	1.2	16 May 2026	Aleksandr Bereznyak	Wheeltop Rotor Chengdu Team	
Tour of Japan	2.2	24–31 May 2026	Matteo Fabbro (ITA)	Solution Tech NIPPO Rali	
(South Korea) Tour de Gyeongnam	2.2	9–13 June 2026	Tommaso Dati (ITA)	Team UKYO	
(Uzbekistan) Grand Prix Jizzakh	2.2	18–19 June 2026	Cameron Scott (AUS)	Li-Ning Star	
(Indonesia) Tour de Banyuwangi Ijen	2.2	27–30 July 2026	Cancelled		
(China) Trans-Himalaya Cycling Race	2.1	2–6 August 2026	Raman Tsishkou (BLR)	Li-Ning Star	
(Uzbekistan) Grand Prix Navoi	2.2	11–13 August 2026	Cancelled		
(Indonesia) Tour de Bintan	1.2	23 August 2026	Cancelled		
(South Korea) Tour de Korea	2.1	31 August – 4 September 2026	Cancelled		
(China) Tour of Shanghai	2.2	4–6 September 2026	Manuele Tarozzi (ITA)	Bardiani–CSF 7 Saber	
(Oman) Dhofar Classic	1.2	5 September 2026	Eduardo Sepúlveda (ARG)	Li-Ning Star	
(Oman) Tour of Salalah	2.2	6–9 September 2026	Simon Pellaud (SUI)	Li-Ning Star	
(China) Tour of Binzhou	1.1	9 September 2026	Serhii Sydor (UKR)	Huansheng–Vonoa–Taishan Sport Cycling Team	
(China) Tour of Taihu Lake	2.1	12–16 September 2026	Matteo Malucelli (ITA)	XDS Astana Team	
(China) Tour of Huangshan	2.1	18–20 September 2026	Luke Mudgway (NZL)	Li-Ning Star	
(China) Tour of Poyang Lake	2.2	20–29 September 2026	Alexander Konychev (ITA)	China Anta–Mentech Cycling Team	
(China) Tour of Mentougou International Road Cycling Race	2.2	25–27 September 2026	Joris Delbove (FRA)	Team TotalEnergies	
(Japan) Oita Urban Classic Road Race	1.2	4 October 2026	Eduardo Sepúlveda (ARG)	Li-Ning Star	
(Japan) Tour de Kyushu	2.1	10–12 October 2026	Ivo Oliveira (POR)	UAE Team Emirates XRG	
Hong Kong Cyclothon	1.1	11 October 2026	Paul Magnier (FRA)	Soudal–Quick-Step	
