= Mynavi =

Mynavi may refer to:

- Mynavi Corporation, an information services and HRtech company in Japan, sponsor of:
- Mynavi ABC Championship, a golf tournament
- Mynavi Blitz Akasaka, a music venue
- Mynavi Sendai, a football club
