= 2025 Coppa Sabatini =

- 2025 UCI ProSeries

Race details
- Dates: 11 September 2025
- Stages: 1
- Distance: 197.6 km (122.8 mi)
- Winning time: 4h 46' 56"

Results
	Winner	Isaac del Toro (MEX)	(UAE Team Emirates XRG)
	Second	Benjamin Thomas (FRA)	(Cofidis)
	Third	Ben Granger (GBR)	(MG.K Vis Costruzioni e Ambiente)

The 2025 Coppa Sabatini (also known as the Gran Premio città di Peccioli) was the 73rd edition of the Coppa Sabatini road cycling one day race, which was held on 11 September 2025 as part of the 2025 UCI ProSeries calendar.

== Teams ==
Eight UCI WorldTeams, twelve UCI ProTeams, and four UCI Continental teams made up the twenty-four teams that participated in the race.

UCI WorldTeams

- Cofidis
- EF Education–EasyPost
- Intermarché–Wanty
- Movistar Team
- Red Bull–Bora–Hansgrohe
- Team Jayco–AlUla
- UAE Team Emirates XRG
- XDS Astana Team

UCI ProTeams

- Burgos Burpellet BH
- Caja Rural–Seguros RGA
- Equipo Kern Pharma
- Euskaltel–Euskadi
- Team Novo Nordisk
- Team Polti VisitMalta
- Tudor Pro Cycling Team
- Team Solution Tech–Vini Fantini
- Team TotalEnergies
- Unibet Tietema Rockets
- Uno-X Mobility
- VF Group–Bardiani–CSF–Faizanè

UCI Continental Teams

- MBH Bank Ballan CSB
- MG.K Vis Costruzioni e Ambiente
- Petrolike
- Sam–Vitalcare–Dynatek

== Result ==
Result
Rank	Rider	Team	Time
1	Isaac del Toro (MEX)	UAE Team Emirates XRG	4h 46' 56"
2	Benjamin Thomas (FRA)	Cofidis	+ 5"
3	Ben Granger (GBR)	MG.K Vis Costruzioni e Ambiente	+ 8"
4	Christian Scaroni (ITA)	XDS Astana Team	+ 28"
5	Alexandre Delettre (FRA)	Team TotalEnergies	+ 32"
6	Marc Hirschi (SUI)	Tudor Pro Cycling Team	+ 32"
7	Richard Carapaz (ECU)	EF Education–EasyPost	+ 32"
8	Pau Miquel (ESP)	Equipo Kern Pharma	+ 32"
9	Jan Christen (SUI)	UAE Team Emirates XRG	+ 32"
10	Davide Piganzoli (ITA)	Team Polti VisitMalta	+ 32"
