= Lucas Boniface =

French cyclist

Personal information
- Born: 24 October 2000 (age 25) Limoges, France
- Height: 1.89 m (6 ft 2 in)

Cycling career
- Sport: Cycling
- Discipline: Road
- Role: Rider

Amateur teams
- 2019–2020: U.V.Limoges-Team U 87
- 2021–2023: Vendée U

Professional teams
- 2023: Team TotalEnergies (stagiaire)
- 2024–2025: Team TotalEnergies

Lucas Boniface (born 24 October 2000) is a retired French road cyclist.

== Major results ==
2022
1st Stage 3 Essor breton
1st Stage 1 Circuit du Mené
1st Stage 4 Tour des Deux-Sèvres
2023
1st Nantes-Segré
Tour de Guadeloupe

1st Points classification
1st Stages 4 & 5

9th Overall Tour du Loir-et-Cher
2025
8th Rund um Köln
