= Rayan Boulahoite =

French bicycle racer

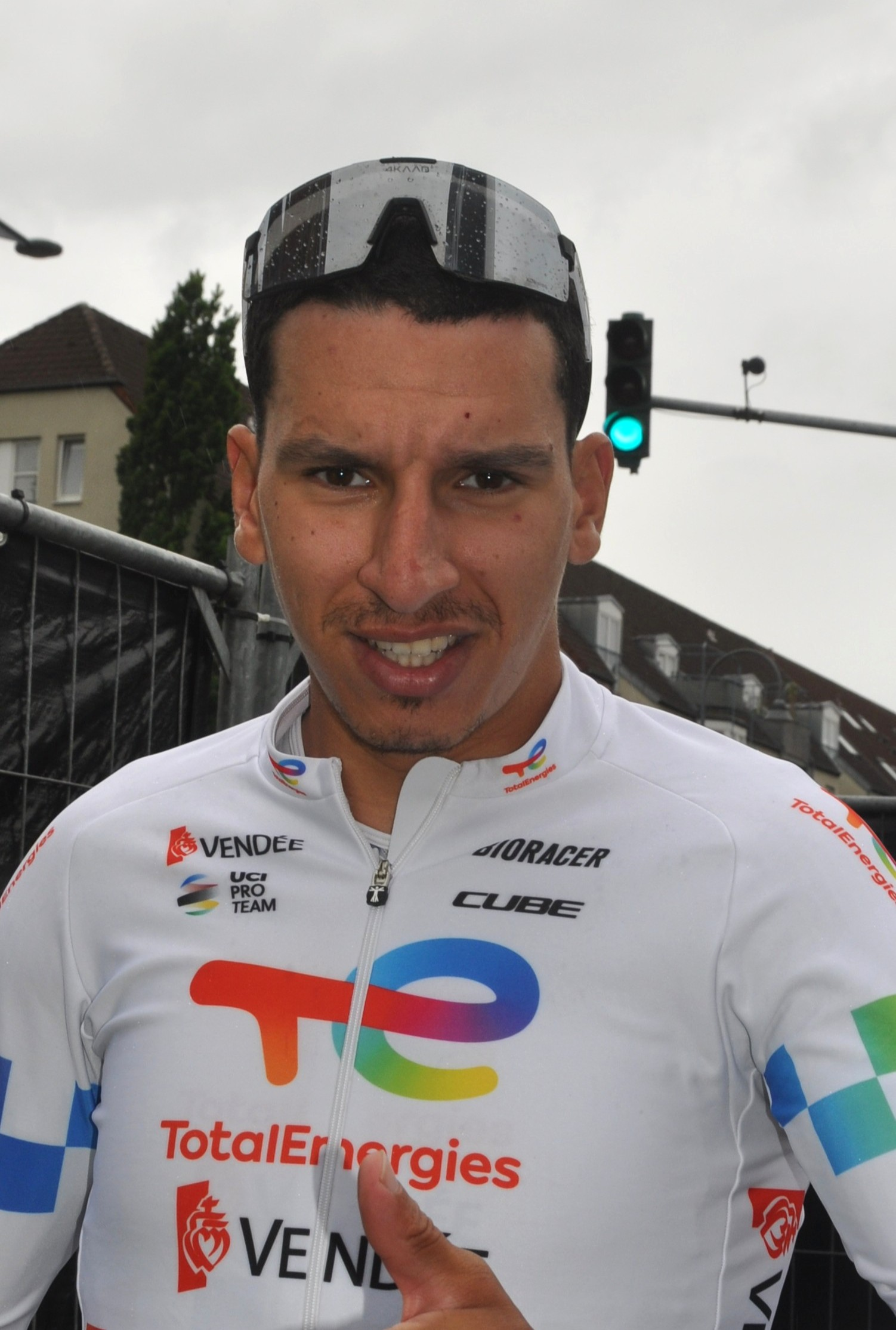
- Boulahoite at the 2026 Rund um Köln

Personal information
- Born: 24 February 2004 (age 22) Colombes, France
- Height: 1.83 m (6 ft 0 in)
- Weight: 75 kg (165 lb)

Cycling career
- Sport: Cycling
- Current team: Team TotalEnergies
- Discipline: Road
- Role: Rider

Amateur teams
- 2021: Team 94 Cycling
- 2022: Argenteuil Val de Seine Cyclisme 95 U19
- 2023–2024: Vendée U

Professional teams
- 2024: Team TotalEnergies (stagiaire)
- 2025–: Team TotalEnergies

Rayan Boulahoite (born 24 February 2004) is a French cyclist, who currently rides for UCI ProTeam Team TotalEnergies.

== Major results ==
2024
6th Overall Tour du Maroc

1st Young rider classification
1st Stage 7

2025
4th Overall Tour of Holland
