= Gustav Wang =

Danish road cyclist (born 2003)

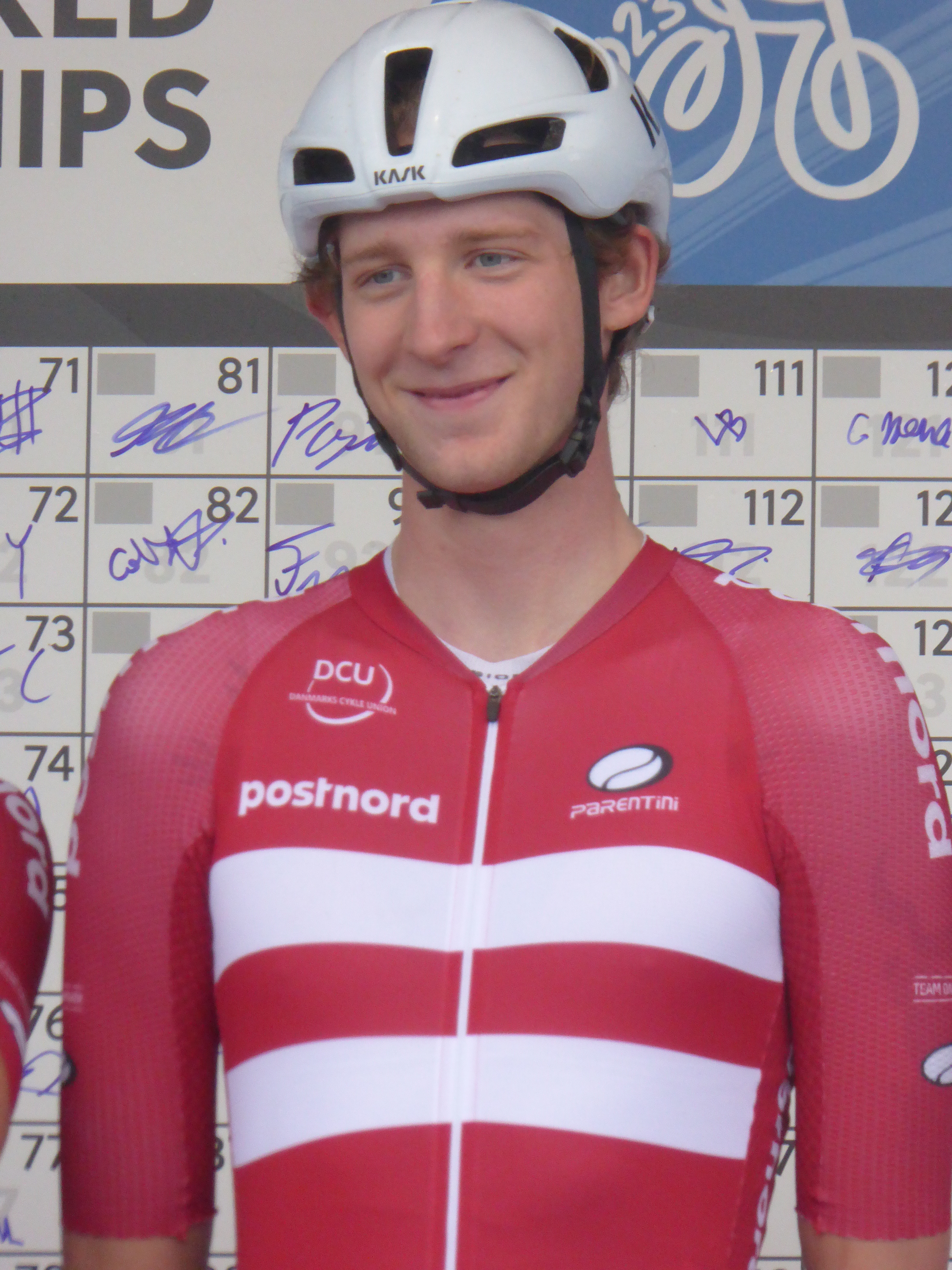
- Wang in 2023

Personal information
- Full name: Gustav Thomas Tornoe Wang
- Born: 13 March 2003 (age 23) Rødovre, Denmark
- Height: 1.87 m (6 ft 2 in)
- Weight: 70 kg (154 lb)

Cycling career
- Sport: Cycling
- Current team: XDS Astana Development Team
- Role: Rider

Amateur team
- 2020–2021: Team ABC Junior

Professional teams
- 2022: BHS–PL Beton Bornholm
- 2023–2024: Restaurant Suri–Carl Ras
- 2025–: XDS Astana Development Team
Medal record
Men's road bicycle racing
Representing Denmark
World Championships
Gold medal – first place	2021 Flanders	Junior time trial
European Championships
Bronze medal – third place	2023 Drenthe	Under-23 time trial

Gustav Thomas Tornoe Wang (born 13 March 2003) is a Danish road cyclist riding for UCI Continental team XDS Astana Development Team. He won the men's junior time trial at the 2021 UCI Road World Championships.

== Major results ==
=== Cyclo-cross ===
2019–2020
1st National Junior Championships
1st Junior Kosice
1st Junior Les Franqueses del Valles
Junior Stockholm Weekend

2nd Täby Park
2nd Stockholm

2nd Junior Gościęcin
Junior Rectavit Series

3rd Sint-Niklaas

3rd Junior Vic
2020–2021
Junior Stockholm Weekend

1st Täby Park

1st Junior Gościęcin
2022–2023
2nd National Championships

=== Road ===
2019
1st Time trial, National Junior Championships
2020
National Junior Championships

1st Time trial
2nd Road race

3rd Overall Visegrad 4 Juniors
2021
1st Time trial, UCI World Junior Championships
1st Stage 1 Aubel–Thimister–Stavelot
2nd Time trial, National Junior Championships
5th Chrono des Nations Juniors
2023
1st Overall Tour of Istanbul

1st Stage 1

1st Stage 3 (TTT) Tour de l'Avenir
2nd Time trial, National Under-23 Championships
2nd Gran Premio della Liberazione
2nd Eschborn–Frankfurt Under-23
3rd Time trial, UEC European Under-23 Championships
2024
1st Time trial, National Under-23 Championships
3rd International Rhodes Grand Prix
2025
4th International Rhodes Grand Prix
