= Shimano Deore XT =

Bicycle component groupset

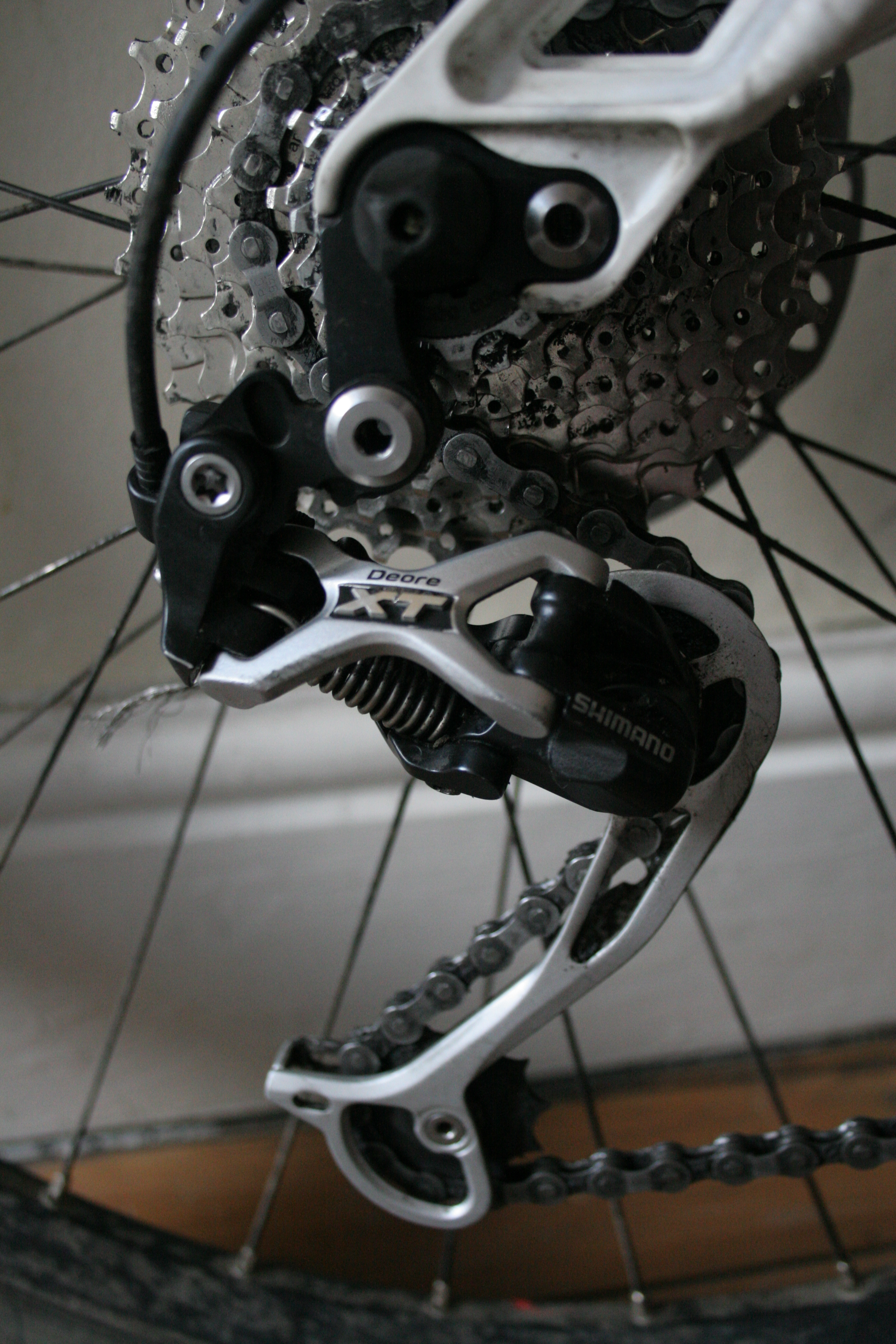
A 2008 Shimano XT rear derailleur with a long cage

Deore XT is a mountain and touring bike groupset first introduced by Shimano in 1983. It was Shimano's first mountain bike groupset, based on their existing Deore touring groupset, and it consisted of a triple-, double- or single chainring crankset, front and rear derailleurs, handlebar-mounted "finger" shifters, cantilever brakes, and large-flange hubs. Since then, it has become their "second-tier" offering, the list of components has expanded to include hydraulic disc brakes, a complete wheelset, a chain, and clipless pedals, and it is offered in silver or black finish.

== Model history ==
The groupset was designated by model numbers M7xx; beginning with M700, and ran to M780. Touring groupsets were designated by model numbers T7xx. Current groupsets are designated by model numbers M8100 and T8000.

- M700 1983 friction (Deer Head)
- M730 1987 6-speed
- M732 1989 7-speed
- M735 1992 7-speed
- M737 1993 8-speed
- M739 1995 8-speed
- M750 1999 9-speed (first groupsets sold already in 1998, these sets are code-stamped WK onwards)
- M760 2003 9-speed
- M770 2008 9/10-speed
  - Rear derailleur: introduction of Shadow low-profile design, which reduced the risk of damage from side hazards. Shimano has released four models of rear derailleur in M770 lineup:
    - RD-M770, 9 speed, reversed spring
    - RD-M771, 9 speed
    - RD-M772, 9 speed, Shadow profile
    - RD-M773, 10 speed, Shadow profile
  - Front Derailleur:
    - FD-M770, 9 speed
- M780 2011 10-speed
  - Shifting Lever:
    - SL-M780-B-IR, 10 speed, I-spec B
    - SL-M780-B-IL, 2/3 speed, I-spec B
    - SL-M780-R, 10 speed, clamp band
    - SL-M780-L, 2/3 speed, clamp band
  - Front Derailleur:
    - FD-M785, 2 speed, clamp band, top swing, dual-pull
    - FD-M785-E2, 2 speed, e-type, top swing, dual-pull
    - FD-M786, 2 speed, clamp band, down swing, dual-pull (top-pull exclusive)
    - FD-M786-D, 2 speed, direct mount, down swing, dual-pull (top-pull exclusive)
    - FD-M780-A-B, 3 speed, clamp band, top swing, dual-pull
    - FD-M781-A-B, 3 speed, clamp band, down swing, dual-pull
    - FD-M781-A-D, 3 speed, direct mount, down swing, top-pull
    - FD-M780-A-E, 3 speed, e-type, top swing, down-pull
  - Rear derailleur: introduction of Shadow Plus technology, which added a switchable clutch used to stabilize chain tension. Shimano has released two versions of the rear derailleur - M781 (without clutch) and M786 (with clutch). Both versions were sold in two cage length options - GS (medium) and SGS (long, 95 mm between centres of jockey wheels axis).
    - RD-M781-SGS, 10 speed, Shadow, long cage (total capacity 43T)
    - RD-M786-SGS, 10 speed, Shadow Plus, long cage (total capacity 43T)
    - RD-M781-GS, 10 speed, Shadow, medium cage (total capacity 35T)
    - RD-M786-GS, 10 speed, Shadow Plus, medium cage (total capacity 35T)
  - Brake Lever:
    - BL-M785-B, hydraulic disc brake, open clamp band, compatible with I-spec B
- T780 2011 10-speed
- M8000 2015 11-speed
  - Shifting Lever:
    - SL-M8000-R, 11 speed, clamp band
    - SL-M8000-L, 2/3 speed, clamp band
    - SL-M8000-IR, 11 speed, I-spec II
    - SL-M8000-IL, 2/3 speed, I-spec II
    - SL-M8000-B-IR, 11 speed, I-spec B
    - SL-M8000-B-IL, 2/3 speed, I-spec B
  - Front Derailleur:
    - FD-M8000-D, 3 speed, direct mount, side swing, front-pull
    - FD-M8000-E, 3 speed, e-type, side swing, front-pull
    - FD-M8000-H, 3 speed, high clamp band, side swing, front-pull
    - FD-M8000-L, 3 speed, low clamp band, side swing, front-pull
    - FD-M8020-D, 2 speed, direct mount, side swing, front-pull
    - FD-M8020-E, 2 speed, e-type, side swing, front-pull
    - FD-M8020-H, 2 speed, high clamp band, side swing, front-pull
    - FD-M8020-L, 2 speed, low clamp band, side swing, front-pull
    - FD-M8025-H, 2 speed, high clamp band, down swing, dual-pull (top-pull exclusive)
    - FD-M8025-L, 2 speed, low clamp band, top swing, dual-pull (down-pull exclusive)
    - FD-M8025-D, 2 speed, direct mount, down swing, dual-pull (top-pull exclusive)
    - FD-M8025-E, 2 speed, e-type, top swing, dual-pull (top-pull exclusive)
  - Rear Derailleur:
    - RD-M8000-SGS, 11 speed, Shadow Plus, long cage (total capacity 47T)
    - RD-M8000-GS, 11 speed, Shadow Plus, medium cage (total capacity 39T)
  - Brake Lever:
    - BL-M8000, hydraulic disc brake, open clamp band, compatible with I-spec II
- T8000 2016 10-speed
- M8100 2019 12-speed
  - Shifting Lever:
    - SL-M8100-R, 12 speed, clamp band
    - SL-M8100-IR, 12 speed, I-spec EV
    - SL-M8100-L, 2 speed, clamp band
    - SL-M8100-IL, 2 speed, I-spec EV
    - SL-M8130-R11, 11 speed, clamp band
    - SL-M8130-IR11, 11 speed, I-spec EV
  - Front Derailleur:
    - FD-M8100-D, 2 speed, direct mount, side swing, front-pull
    - FD-M8100-E, 2 speed, e-type, side swing, front-pull
    - FD-M8100-M, 2 speed, clamp band, side swing, front-pull
  - Rear Derailleur:
    - RD-M8100-SGS, 12 speed (1 front speed), sprocket 10T to 51T, Shadow RD+, long cage (total capacity 41T)
    - RD-M8100-GS, 12 speed (1 front speed), sprocket 10T to 45T, Shadow RD+, short cage (total capacity 35T)
    - RD-M8120-SGS, 12 speed (2 front speed), sprocket 10T to 45T, Shadow RD+, long cage (total capacity 45T)
    - RD-M8130-SGS, 11 speed (1 front speed), sprocket 11T to 50T, Shadow RD+, long cage (total capacity 39T)
  - Brake Lever:
    - BL-M8100, hydraulic disc brake, open clamp band, compatible with I-spec EV
  - Crankset:
    - FC-M8100-1, 1 speed, q-factor 172mm, chainring 36T,34T,32T,30T,28T. For Rear Freehub O.L.D Thru 142 or 148mm, QR/Nut 135 or 141mm
    - FC-M8100-2, 2 speed, q-factor 172mm, chainring 36-26T. For Rear Freehub O.L.D Thru 142mm or QR/Nut 135mm
    - FC-M8120-B2, 2 speed, q-factor 178mm, chainring 36-26T. For Rear Freehub O.L.D Thru 148mm or QR/Nut 141mm
    - FC-M8130-1, 1 speed, q-factor 181mm, chainring 34T,32T,30T,28T. For Rear Freehub O.L.D Thru 157mm
  - Bottom Bracket:
    - BB-MT800, Hollowtech II, Threaded bottom bracket shell width 68 or 73mm, average weight 83g
    - BB-MT801, Hollowtech II, Threaded bottom bracket shell width 68 or 73mm, average weight 84g
    - BB-MT800-PA, Hollowtech II, Press-Fit bottom bracket shell width 89.5 or 92mm, average weight weight 69g
  - Rear Freehub:
    - FH-M8110, 12 speed, Center Lock, O.L.D Thru 142mm, dia 12mm, Spoke hole 28H or 32H or 36H
    - FH-M8110-B, 12 speed, Center Lock, O.L.D Thru 148mm, dia 12mm, Spoke hole 28H or 32H or 36H
    - FH-M8110-BS, 12 speed, Center Lock, O.L.D Thru 148mm, dia 12mm, Spoke hole 28H
    - FH-M8130-B, 12 speed, Center Lock, O.L.D Thru 157mm, dia 12mm, Spoke hole 28H, 32H
