= 2022 Israel–Premier Tech season =

Israel–Premier Tech
- 2022 season
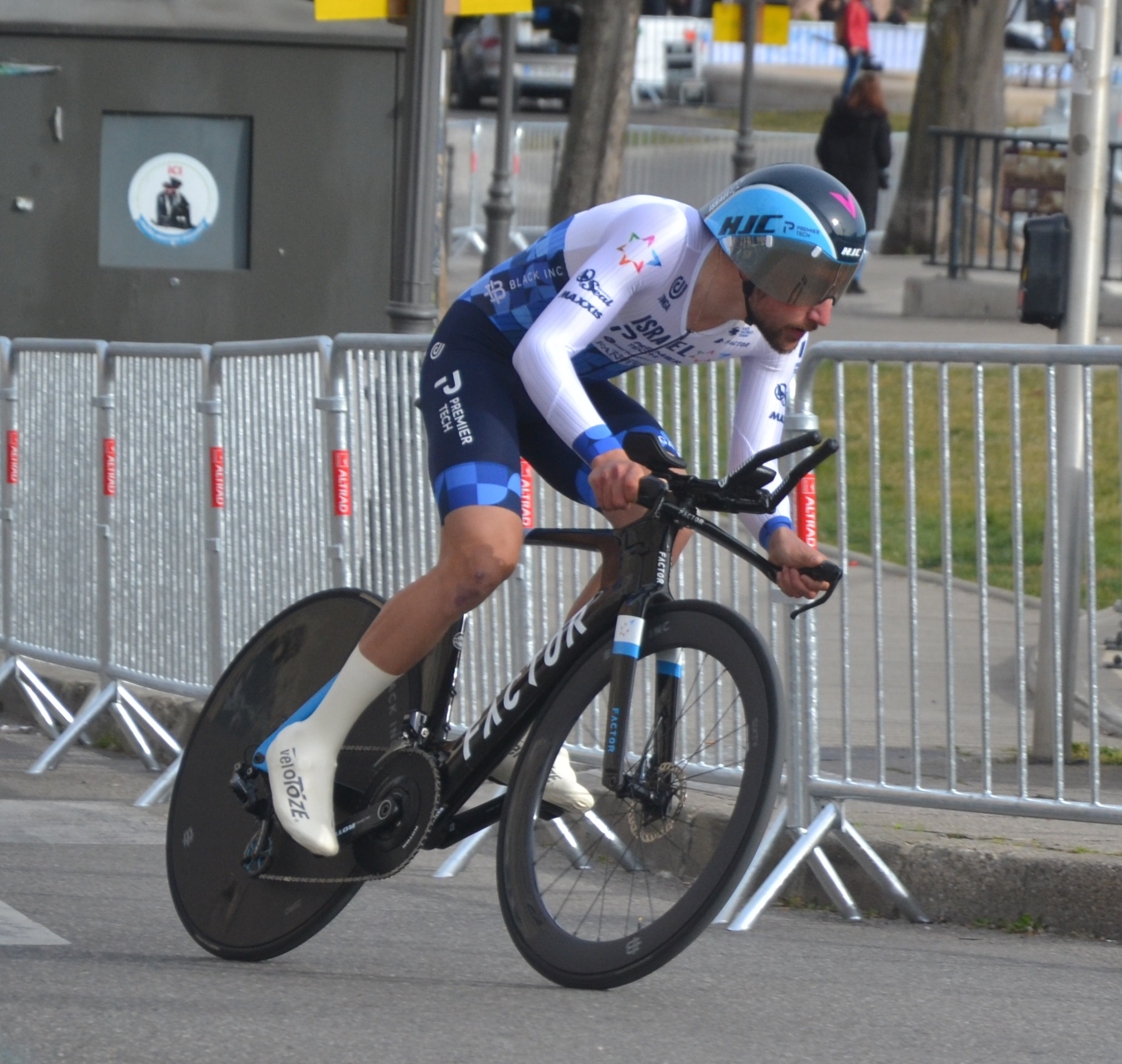
- Guy Sagiv on Étoile de Bessèges
- UCI code: IPT
- Status: UCI WorldTeam
- Owner: Sylvan Adams; Ron Baron
- Manager: Kjell Carlström (FIN)
- Main sponsor(s): Start-Up Nation Central; Premier Tech
- Based: Israel
- Bicycles: Factor
- Groupset: Shimano

Season victories
- One-day races: 1
- Stage race overall: 1
- Stage race stages: 4
- Jersey

The 2022 cycling season for Israel–Premier Tech is the team's third season as a UCI WorldTeam and its eighth season overall. Ahead of the season, the team announced that Canadian tech company Premier Tech would join as a co-title sponsor. They use Factor bicycles, Shimano drivetrain, Black Inc wheels and Inga clothing.

== Roster ==
As of 12 January 2022.

| Rider | Date of birth |
|---|---|
| Rudy Barbier (FRA) | 18 December 1992 (aged 29) |
| Sebastian Berwick (AUS) | 15 December 1999 (aged 22) |
| Patrick Bevin (NZL) | 15 February 1991 (aged 30) |
| Jenthe Biermans (BEL) | 30 October 1995 (aged 26) |
| Guillaume Boivin (CAN) | 25 May 1989 (aged 32) |
| Matthias Brändle (AUT) | 7 December 1989 (aged 32) |
| Alexander Cataford (CAN) | 1 September 1993 (aged 28) |
| Simon Clarke (AUS) | 18 July 1986 (aged 35) |
| Alessandro De Marchi (ITA) | 19 May 1986 (aged 35) |
| Alex Dowsett (GBR) | 3 October 1988 (aged 33) |
| Itamar Einhorn (ISR) | 20 September 1997 (aged 24) |
| Chris Froome (GBR) | 20 May 1985 (aged 36) |
| Jakob Fuglsang (DEN) | 22 March 1985 (aged 36) |
| Omer Goldstein (ISR) | 13 August 1996 (aged 25) |
| Carl Fredrik Hagen (NOR) | 26 September 1991 (aged 30) |
| Ben Hermans (BEL) | 8 June 1986 (aged 35) |

| Rider | Date of birth |
|---|---|
| Reto Hollenstein (SUI) | 22 August 1985 (aged 36) |
| Hugo Houle (CAN) | 27 September 1990 (aged 31) |
| Daryl Impey (RSA) | 6 December 1984 (aged 37) |
| Taj Jones (AUS) | 26 July 2000 (aged 21) |
| Krists Neilands (LAT) | 18 August 1994 (aged 27) |
| Guy Niv (ISR) | 8 March 1994 (aged 27) |
| Giacomo Nizzolo (ITA) | 30 January 1989 (aged 32) |
| James Piccoli (CAN) | 5 September 1991 (aged 30) |
| Guy Sagiv (ISR) | 5 December 1994 (aged 27) |
| Corbin Strong (NZL) | 30 April 2000 (aged 21) |
| Tom Van Asbroeck (BEL) | 19 April 1990 (aged 31) |
| Sep Vanmarcke (BEL) | 28 July 1988 (aged 33) |
| Michael Woods (CAN) | 12 October 1986 (aged 35) |
| Mads Würtz Schmidt (DEN) | 31 March 1994 (aged 27) |
| Rick Zabel (GER) | 7 December 1993 (aged 28) |

Riders who joined the team for the 2022 season

| Rider | 2021 team |
|---|---|
| Simon Clarke | Team Qhubeka NextHash |
| Jakob Fuglsang | Astana–Premier Tech |
| Hugo Houle | Astana–Premier Tech |
| Giacomo Nizzolo | Team Qhubeka NextHash |
| Corbin Strong | neo-pro (SEG Racing Academy) |

Riders who left the team during or after the 2021 season

| Rider | 2022 team |
|---|---|
| Davide Cimolai | Cofidis |
| André Greipel | Retired |
| Hugo Hofstetter | Arkéa–Samsic |
| Dan Martin | Retired |
| Alexis Renard | Cofidis |
| Norman Vahtra | Go Sport–Roubaix–Lille Métropole |

== Season victories ==
| Date | Race | Competition | Rider | Country | Location | Ref. |
|---|---|---|---|---|---|---|
| 25 February | O Gran Camiño, Stage 2 | UCI Europe Tour | Michael Woods (CAN) | Spain | Mirador de Ézaro | |
| 16 April | Presidential Tour of Turkey, Stage 7 | UCI ProSeries | Patrick Bevin (NZL) | Turkey | Tekirdağ | |
| 17 April | Presidential Tour of Turkey, Overall | UCI ProSeries | Patrick Bevin (NZL) | Turkey | | |
| 29 April | Tour de Romandie, Stage 3 | UCI World Tour | Patrick Bevin (NZL) | Switzerland | Valbroye | |
| 31 May | Mercan'Tour Classic Alpes-Maritimes | UCI Europe Tour | Jakob Fuglsang (DEN) | France | Col de Valberg | |
| 19 July | Tour de France, Stage 16 | UCI World Tour | Hugo Houle (CAN) | France | Foix | |

== National, Continental, and World Champions ==
| Date | Discipline | Jersey | Rider | Country | Location | Ref. |
