= 2026 Hong Kong Cyclothon =

2026 Sun Hung Kai Properties Hong Kong Cyclothon
2026 UCI Asia Tour

Race details
- Dates: 11 October 2026
- Stages: 1
- Distance: 100.4 km (62.4 mi)
- Winning time: 2h 03' 30"

Results
	Winner	Paul Magnier (FRA)	(Soudal–Quick-Step)
	Second	Max Kanter (GER)	(XDS Astana Team)
	Third	Matteo Moschetti (ITA)	(Pinarello–Q36.5 Pro Cycling Team)

The 2026 Hong Kong Cyclothon (2026 Sun Hung Kai Properties Hong Kong Cyclothon for sponsorship purposes) is the 3rd edition of the Hong Kong Cyclothon one-day road cycling race, and the first in 4 years since the 2023 edition. It was held on 11 October 2026 as a category 1.1 race on the 2026 UCI Asia Tour, starting and finishing on Museum Drive in the West Kowloon Cultural District. The race was part of the bigger Hong Kong Cyclothon event that includes multiple no-competitive races.

== Teams ==
Six UCI WorldTeams, six UCI ProTeams, four UCI Continental Teams and one national team made up the sixteen teams that participated in the race.

UCI WorldTeams

- Alpecin–Premier Tech
- Lotto–Intermarché
- NSN Cycling Team
- Soudal–Quick-Step
- Team Jayco–AlUla
- XDS Astana Team

UCI ProTeams

- Cofidis
- Euskaltel–Euskadi
- MBH Bank CSB Telecom Fort
- Pinarello–Q36.5 Pro Cycling Team
- Team Polti VisitMalta
- Tudor Pro Cycling Team

UCI Continental Teams

- Li-Ning Star
- Shenzhen Kung Cycling Team
- Terengganu Cycling Team
- The Joyrun & Hurricane Cycling Team

National Teams

- Hong Kong

== Result ==
Result (1–10)
Rank	Rider	Team	Time
1	Paul Magnier (FRA)	Soudal–Quick-Step	2h 03' 30"
2	Max Kanter (GER)	XDS Astana Team	+ 0"
3	Matteo Moschetti (ITA)	Pinarello–Q36.5 Pro Cycling Team	+ 0"
4	Robert Donaldson (GBR)	Team Jayco–AlUla	+ 0"
5	Lionel Taminiaux (BEL)	Lotto–Intermarché	+ 0"
6	Marcin Budziński (POL)	MBH Bank CSB Telecom Fort	+ 0"
7	Nicolo Buratti (ITA)	MBH Bank CSB Telecom Fort	+ 0"
8	Joseph Pidcock (GBR)	Pinarello–Q36.5 Pro Cycling Team	+ 0"
9	Gari Ugarte (ESP)	Euskaltel–Euskadi	+ 0"
10	Emīls Liepiņš (LAT)	Pinarello–Q36.5 Pro Cycling Team	+ 3"
