= Tour of Istanbul =

Turkish multi-day road cycling race

Race details
- Date: September
- Region: Istanbul, Turkey
- Discipline: Road
- Competition: UCI Europe Tour
- Type: Stage race
- Web site: www.tourofistanbul.com.tr

History
- First edition: 2023
- Editions: 4 (as of 2026)
- First winner: Gustav Wang (DEN)
- Most wins: No repeat winners
- Most recent: Baptiste Vadic (FRA)

The Tour of Istanbul is a multi-day cycling race held annually in Turkey around the city of Istanbul. It is part of UCI Europe Tour as a category 2.1 event.

== Winners ==
Year	Country	Rider	Team
2023	Denmark	Gustav Wang	Restaurant Suri–Carl Ras
2024	France	Mathieu Burgaudeau	Team TotalEnergies
2025	Belgium	Mauro Cuylits	Lotto
2026	France	Baptiste Vadic	Team TotalEnergies
