= 2026 Japan Cup =

2026 Utsunomiya Japan Cup Cycle Road Race
2026 UCI ProSeries

Race details
- Dates: 18 October 2026
- Stages: 1
- Distance: 144.2 km (89.6 mi)
- Winning time: 3h 33' 02"

Results
| | Winner | Quinn Simmons (USA) | (Lidl–Trek) |
| | Second | Ben Healy (IRE) | (EF Education–EasyPost) |
| | Third | Jenno Berckmoes (BEL) | (Lotto–Intermarché) |

The 2026 Utsunomiya Japan Cup Cycle Road Race was the 33rd edition of the Japan Cup single-day cycling race. It was held on 18 October 2026 as part of the 2026 UCI ProSeries calendar.

== Teams ==
Five UCI WorldTeams and UCI ProTeams, eight UCI Continental teams, and one national team made up the nineteen teams that participated in the race.

UCI WorldTeams

- EF Education–EasyPost
- Lidl–Trek
- Lotto–Intermarché
- Team Bahrain Victorious
- Team Jayco–AlUla

UCI ProTeams

- Cofidis
- Solution Tech NIPPO Rali
- Team Novo Nordisk
- Team TotalEnergies
- Tudor Pro Cycling Team

UCI Continental Teams

- Aisan Racing Team
- Astemo Utsunomiya Blitzen
- Kinan Racing Team
- Pogi Team Gusto Ljubljana
- Shimano Racing Team
- Team UKYO
- VC Fukuoka
- Victoire Hiroshima

National Teams

- Japan

== Results ==
Result
| Rank | Rider | Team | Time |
|---|---|---|---|
| 1 | Quinn Simmons (USA) | Lidl–Trek | 3h 33' 02" |
| 2 | Ben Healy (IRE) | EF Education–EasyPost | + 0" |
| 3 | Jenno Berckmoes (BEL) | Lotto–Intermarché | + 1' 12" |
| 4 | Jordan Jegat (FRA) | Team TotalEnergies | + 1' 12" |
| 5 | Nicolò Garibbo (ITA) | Team UKYO | + 1' 12" |
| 6 | Julien Bernard (FRA) | Lidl–Trek | + 1' 12" |
| 7 | Sam Maisonobe (FRA) | Cofidis | + 1' 15" |
| 8 | Federico Iacomoni (ITA) | Team UKYO | + 1' 57" |
| 9 | Baptiste Vadic (FRA) | Team TotalEnergies | + 1' 57" |
| 10 | Alexandre Delettre (FRA) | Team TotalEnergies | + 1' 57" |
