= Jordan Jegat =

French cyclist

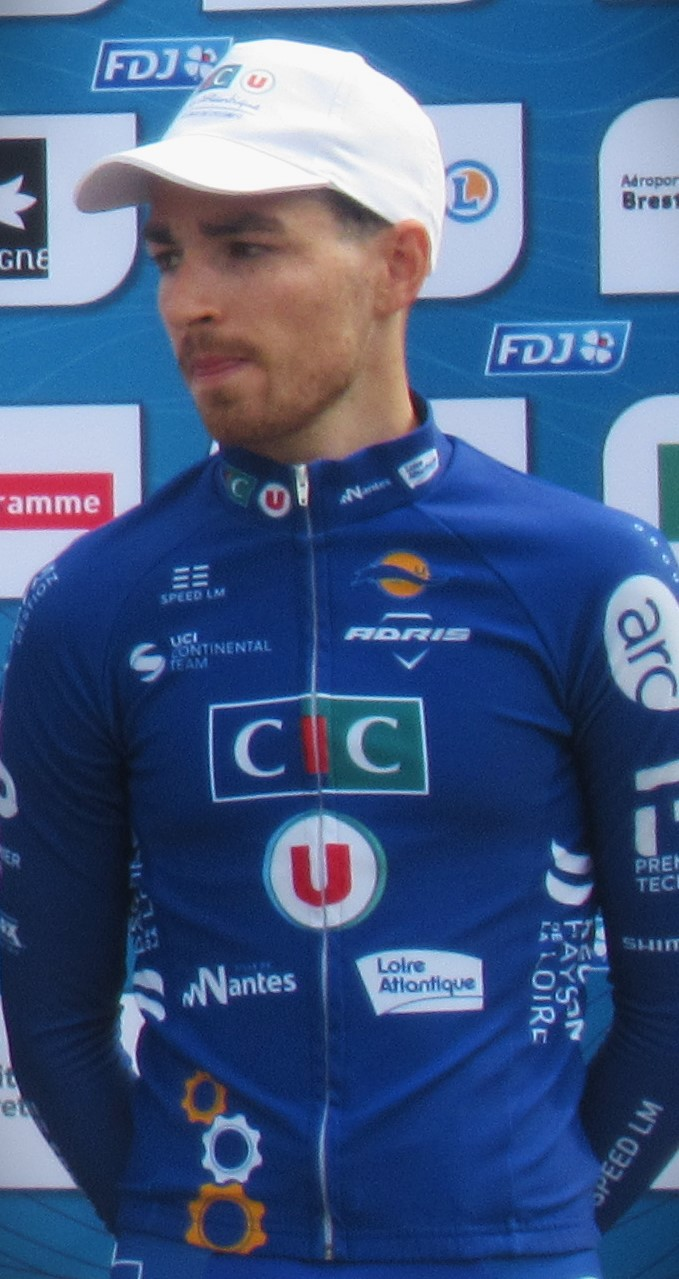
- Jegat in 2023

Personal information
- Born: 7 June 1999 (age 27) Bignan, France
- Height: 1.76 m (5 ft 9 in)
- Weight: 59 kg (130 lb)

Cycling career
- Sport: Cycling
- Current team: Team TotalEnergies
- Discipline: Road
- Role: Rider

Amateur teams
- 2017: OC Locminé
- 2018–2019: Team Fybolia–Locminé Auto
- 2020–2021: Team UC Nantes Atlantique

Professional teams
- 2022–2023: Team UC Nantes Atlantique
- 2024–: Team TotalEnergies

Jordan Jegat (born 7 June 1999) is a French road cyclist, who currently rides for UCI ProTeam Team TotalEnergies.

He finished 10th overall at the 2025 Tour de France, moving up from 11th on the penultimate stage after taking part in the day's breakaway.

== Major results ==
2021
10th Chrono des Nations U23
2022
7th Overall Tour Alsace
2023
3rd Polynormande
6th Overall Tour du Limousin
8th Overall Tour de l'Ain
9th Overall Alpes Isère Tour
2024
2nd Tour du Jura
3rd Giro della Toscana
5th Overall Tour de Kyushu
8th Overall Tour de Luxembourg
8th Ardèche Classic
10th Classic Grand Besançon Doubs
2025
6th Overall Tour de l'Ain
7th Giro della Toscana
10th Overall Tour de France
10th Overall AlUla Tour
10th Overall Tour de Kyushu
2026 (1 pro win)
1st Classic Grand Besançon Doubs
2nd Giro della Toscana
3rd Tour du Jura
4th Overall Tour of Turkiye
4th Japan Cup
10th Overall Tour de France

=== Grand Tour general classification results timeline ===
| Grand Tour | 2024 | 2025 | 2026 |
|---|---|---|---|
| Giro d'Italia | — | — | — |
| Tour de France | 28 | 10 | 10 |
| Vuelta a España | — | — | |

Legend
| — | Did not compete |
| DNF | Did not finish |
