= Baptiste Vadic =

French bicycle racer

Personal information
- Born: 15 April 2002 (age 24) Guéret, France

Cycling career
- Sport: Cycling
- Current team: Team TotalEnergies
- Discipline: Road
- Role: Rider

Amateur teams
- 2019–2020: Creuse Oxygène Guéret
- 2021–2023: Vendée U

Professional team
- 2024–: Team TotalEnergies

Baptiste Vadic (born 15 April 2002) is a French cyclist, who currently rides for UCI ProTeam Team TotalEnergies.

== Major results ==
2019
1st Prix Albert-Gagnet
2020
1st Tour du Gévaudan Occitanie Juniors
2022
1st Stage 2 Tour de la Mirabelle
1st Stage 2 Tour de Moselle
2023
1st Circuit de l'Essor
1st Manche-Atlantique
10th Overall Ronde de l'Oise

1st Stage 2

2025
2nd Overall Tour of Istanbul
9th Vuelta a Castilla y León
2026 (3 pro wins)
1st Overall Tour of Istanbul

1st Points classification
1st Stages 1 & 4 (ITT)

7th Vuelta a Castilla y León
8th Grand Prix de Wallonie
9th Japan Cup
