= Thomas Bonnet =

French cyclist

- Bonnet in 2026

Personal information
- Born: 13 September 1998 (age 28) Châtellerault, France
- Height: 1.75 m (5 ft 9 in)

Cycling career
- Sport: Cycling
- Current team: Team TotalEnergies
- Disciplines: Road; Cyclo-cross; Mountain biking
- Role: Rider

Amateur teams
- 2015: Creuse Oxygène Junior
- 2016–2017: VTT Club Argentat
- 2018–2022: Vendée U

Professional teams
- 2021: Team TotalEnergies (stagiaire)
- 2023–: Team TotalEnergies

Thomas Bonnet (born 13 September 1998) is a French road and cyclo-cross racing cyclist, who currently rides for UCI ProTeam Team TotalEnergies. He won the bronze medal in the men's junior event at the 2016 UCI Cyclo-cross World Championships in Heusden-Zolder.

== Major results ==
=== Cyclo-cross ===
2014-2015
Junior Coupe de France

1st Besançon

2015–2016
UCI Junior World Cup

1st Heusden-Zolder

2nd Overall Junior Coupe de France

2nd Quelneuc

3rd UCI World Junior Championships
3rd UEC European Junior Championships
2016–2017
Under-23 Coupe de France

3rd Erôme Gervans

=== Mountain bike ===
2016
1st Cross-country, UCI World Junior Championships
1st Cross-country, UEC European Junior Championships
2019
2nd Cross-country, National Under-23 Championships

=== Road ===
2021
4th Overall Tour de la Guadeloupe

1st Stage 6

2022
2nd Overall Tour de Normandie
2nd Overall Flèche du Sud
2023
1st Stage 4 Tour du Rwanda
5th Antwerp Port Epic
2024
8th Overall Tour de Kyushu
2025
9th Overall Tour de Kyushu
2026
6th Overall Arctic Race of Norway

==== Grand Tour general classification results timeline ====
Grand Tour	2023
Giro d'Italia	—
Tour de France	—
Vuelta a España	DNF
