= Ben Granger =

British cyclist

Personal information
- Born: 8 August 2000 (age 26) Oxford, United Kingdom
- Height: 1.83 m (6 ft 0 in)
- Weight: 71 kg (157 lb)

Cycling career
- Sport: Cycling
- Current team: Solution Tech NIPPO Rali
- Discipline: Road
- Role: Rider

Amateur team
- 2021–2022: Holdsworth Zappi Team

Professional teams
- 2022: MG.K Vis Colors for Peace VPM (stagiaire)
- 2022–2025: MG.K Vis Colors for Peace VPM
- 2026–: Solution Tech NIPPO Rali

Ben Granger (born 8 August 2000) is a British professional road racing cyclist who currently rides for UCI ProTeam Solution Tech NIPPO Rali.

== Major results ==
2021
3rd GP Città di Montegranaro
5th Lancaster Grand Prix
2022
4th Piccola Sanremo
7th Beaumont Trophy
2023
1st Giro del Valdarno
4th Giro del Casentino
6th Grand Prix Colli Rovescalesi
8th Coppa Bologna
2024
1st Giro del Montalbano
1st Lancaster Grand Prix
8th Trofeo Città di Brescia
8th Trofeo Comune di Monte Urano
8th Coppa Messapica
8th Gran Premio Calvatone
9th Overall Giro del Veneto
2025
1st Rutland–Melton CiCLE Classic
1st Giro del Montalbano
1st Giro del Valdarno
1st Firenze-Empoli
2nd Gran Premio Industria e Commercio Artigianato Carnaghese
3rd Coppa Sabatini
5th Grand Prix Colli Rovescalesi
6th Giro della Provincia di Reggio Calabria
8th Lincoln Grand Prix
9th Trofeo Città di Brescia
