= 2025 UCI Africa Tour =

21st season of the UCI Africa Tour

- Twenty-first edition of the UCI Africa Tour

Details
- Dates: 22 January – 5 October
- Location: Africa
- Races: 10

The 2025 UCI Africa Tour is the 21st season of the UCI Africa Tour. The season began on 22 January with the 5th edition of Tour du Sahel and will end in October 2025.

The points leader, based on the cumulative results of previous races, wore the UCI Africa Tour cycling jersey.

Throughout the season, points were awarded to the top finishers of stages within stage races and the final general classification standings of each of the stages races and one-day events. The quality and complexity of a race also determined how many points were awarded to the top finishers: the higher the UCI rating of a race, the more points were awarded. The UCI ratings from highest to lowest were as follows:

- Multi-day events: 2.1 and 2.2
- One-day events: 1.1 and 1.2

== Events ==
Races in the 2025 UCI Africa Tour
Race	Rating	Date	Winner	Team	Ref
(Mauritania) Tour du Sahel	2.2	22–26 January 2025	Stefan Verhoeff (NED)	Universe Cycling Team	
(Algeria) Grand Prix Sakiat Sidi Youcef	1.2	8 February 2025	Milkias Maekele (ERI)	Eritrea (national team)	
(Algeria) Tour d'Algérie	2.2	9–18 February 2025	Hamza Amari (ALG)	Madar Pro Cycling Team	
(Algeria) Grand Prix Sonatrache	1.2	20 February 2025	Azzedine Lagab (ALG)	Madar Pro Cycling Team	
(Algeria) Grand Prix de la Ville d'Alger	1.2	22 February 2025	Yacine Hamza (ALG)	Madar Pro Cycling Team	
Tour du Rwanda	2.1	23 February – 2 March 2025	Fabien Doubey (FRA)	Team TotalEnergies	
(Benin) Tour du Bénin	2.2	28 April – 3 May 2025	Reinardt Janse van Rensburg (RSA)	Team Tshenolo Pro Cycling	
(Benin) Grand Prix de Cotonou	1.2	4 May 2025	Reinardt Janse van Rensburg (RSA)	Team Tshenolo Pro Cycling	
(Cameroon) Tour du Cameroun	2.2	4–15 June 2025	Islam Mansouri (ALG)	Algeria (national team)	
(Cameroon) Grand Prix Chantal Biya	2.2	10–14 September 2025	Alexandre Mayer (MRI)	Mauritius (national team)	
