= Tour de Kyushu =

Japanese multi-day road cycling race

Race details
- Date: October
- Region: Kyushu, Japan
- English name: Tour of Kyushu
- Local name: ツール・ド・九州 (in Japanese)
- Discipline: Road
- Competition: UCI Asia Tour 2.1
- Type: Stage race
- Organiser: Tour de Kyushu Association
- Web site: www.tourdekyushu.asia

History
- First edition: 2023
- Editions: 4 (as of 2026)
- First winner: Andrey Zeits (KAZ)
- Most wins: No repeat winners
- Most recent: Ivo Oliveira (POR)

The Tour de Kyushu is an annual professional road bicycle racing stage race held in Kyushu, Japan for the first time in October 2023, as part of the UCI Asia Tour. It is rated by the International Cycling Union (UCI) as a 2.1 category race. The race was created to showcase the recovery from recent disasters in Kyushu.

== 2023 edition ==
The main sponsor for the 2023 edition was the Mynavi Corporation. Three-stages made up the race plus a pre race criterium. The Criterium consisted of multiple laps of a small city circuit for a total of 45km. Stage 1 will be a 145km route from Kitakyushu to Ōmuta. Stage 2 was 120km over hilly terrain going through the Aso Mountains, starting in Minami Oguni and ending in Minami Aso. The final stage of the race was a stage for the sprinters of 135km starting with a decent followed by laps of a circuit around Hita to finish.

In preparation for the Race in 2023 the organisers ran a virtual race with segments from each of the stages.

== Winners ==
Year	Country	Rider	Team
2023	Kazakhstan	Andrey Zeits	Astana Qazaqstan Team
2024	France	Emilien Jeannière	Team TotalEnergies
2025	No winner (Note: Kyrylo Tsarenko (UKR) from Team Solution Tech–Vini Fantini was the original winner of this race, but after it was revealed that he accepted a one year period of ineligiblity from 1 July 2025 until 30 June 2026 for his role in anti doping rule violation, all of his results from 1 July 2025 until 3 December 2025 were voided, including his win in Tour de Kyushu.)		
2026	Portugal	Ivo Oliveira	UAE Team Emirates XRG
