= Mynavi Corporation =

Japanese company

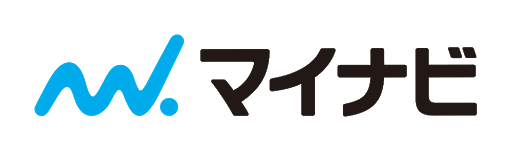
Mynavi Corporation logo

Mynavi Corporation is a Japanese company, active mostly in publishing and human resources businesses, that "celebrated its 50th anniversary on August 15, 2023".

Mynavi is the naming sponsor of Mynavi ABC Championship golf tournament, Mynavi Sendai football club, and the Mynavi Blitz Akasaka music venue.
