= Vendée U Primeo Energie =

French road cycling team

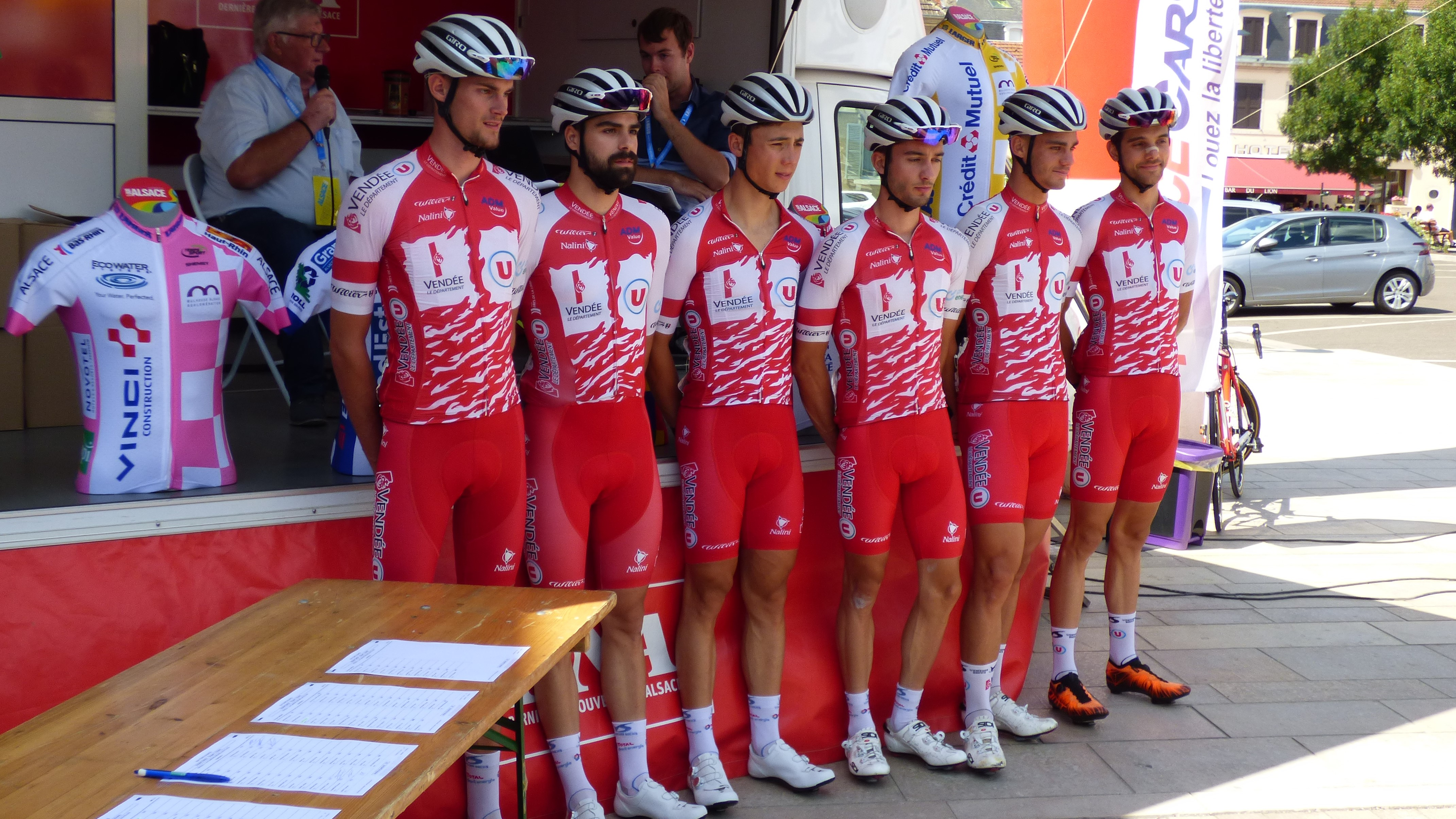
- The team in 2019

Team information
- Registered: France
- Founded: 1991; 35 years ago
- Discipline: Road
- Status: DN1 (until 2024); UCI Continental (2025–present)
- Bicycles: Wilier Triestina

Key personnel
- Team manager: Hervé Arcade

Team name history
- 1991–1999; 2000–2005; 2006–2015; 2015–2025; 2026–: Vendée U; Vendée U–Pays de la Loire; Vendée U; Vendée U Pays de la Loire; Vendée U Primeo Energie

Vendée U Primeo Energie is a French road cycling team established in 1991. Since 2025, the team has held UCI Continental status, upgrading from national first-division (DN1) club status. It acts as the development program for UCI ProTeam Team TotalEnergies. Notable riders to have ridden for the team include Thomas Voeckler, Sylvain Chavanel, Jérôme Cousin, Bryan Coquard and Lilian Calmejane among others.

In 2021, after over 30 years, the team changed their colors from red and white to match the jerseys of Team TotalEnergies.
