= Groupset =

Organized collection of bicycle parts

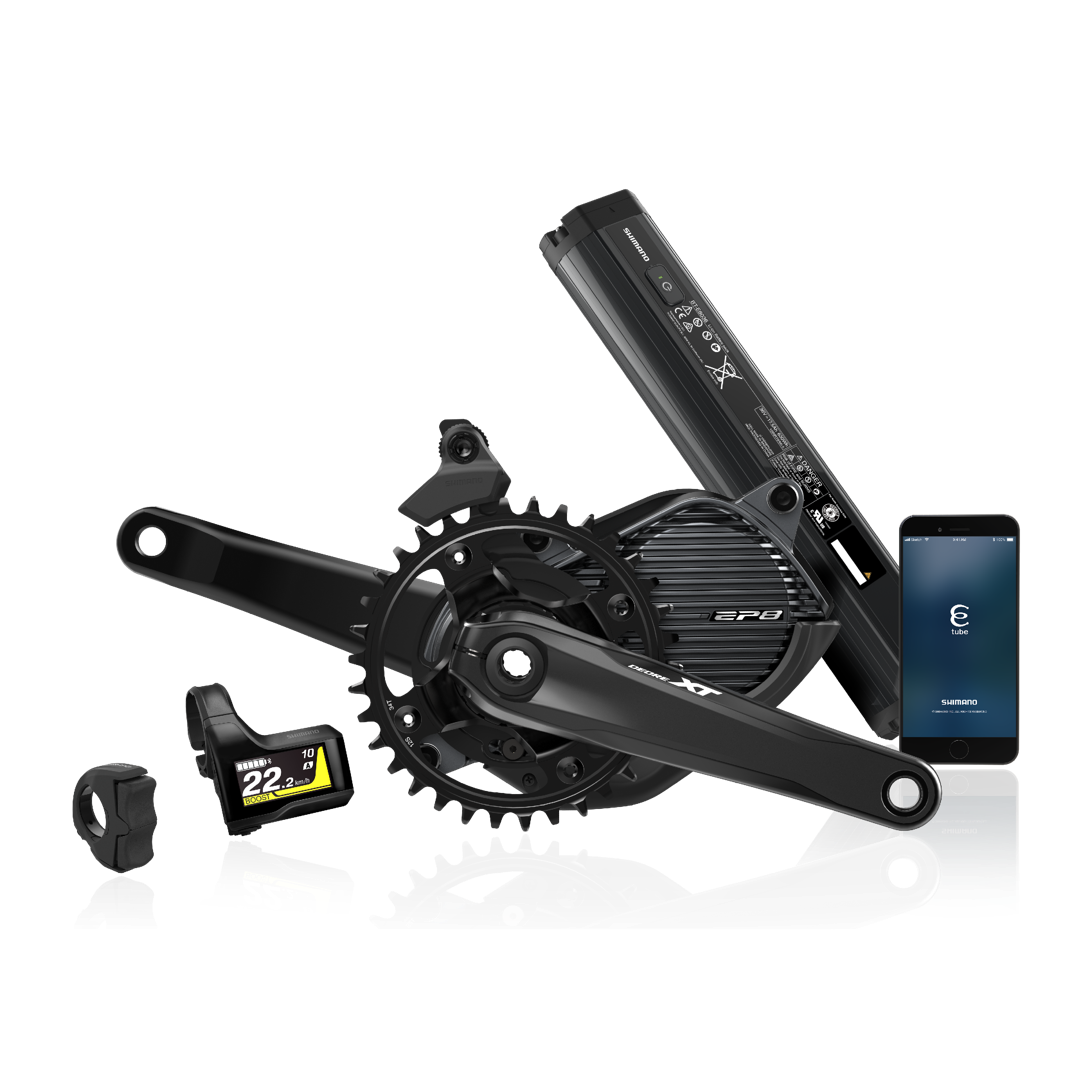
Part of a groupset for an electric-drive bicycle with crankset, motor, boost controller, battery and a smart phone

A groupset or gruppo (from the Italian for "group", sometimes misspelled grouppo) is a bicycle component manufacturer's organized collection of mechanical parts. It generally refers to all of the components that make up a bicycle excluding the bicycle frame, fork, stem, wheels, tires, and rider contact points, such as the saddle and handlebars.

These parts typically include the following:

- 2 gear levers or shifters and
- 2 brake levers or
- 2 integrated brake levers/shifters
- 2 brakes, front and rear
- 2 derailleurs, front and rear
- 1 bottom bracket
- 1 crankset
- 1 chain
- 1 cogset, freewheel or cassette

With the following forming part of some groupsets:

- 1 headset (more commonly included with vintage groupsets)
- 1 seatpost
- 2 hubs, front and rear (although, most manufacturers now offer groupset-branded pre-built wheels)
- Pair of pedals
- assorted cables and cable housing

Except for special commemorative versions, manufacturers do not actually package the various components together to be sold by retailers as a complete groupset. Therefore when a modern road groupset is bought after-market (as an upgrade for an older bike, or for someone building their own bike), the customer can choose which parts they require, the price of the groupset is just the individual prices of the chosen parts added together.

The major groupset manufacturers are Campagnolo for road bicycles and Shimano and SRAM for both road and mountain bikes.

Manufacturers typically offer a range of several groupsets, each targeted at a different budget or use. For instance, Dura-Ace, Super Record and Red are the top-of-the-line road racing groupsets for Shimano, Campagnolo and SRAM respectively while Claris, Veloce and Apex are their entry level road racing group sets, respectively.

== See also ==
- List of bicycle parts
- List of Shimano groupsets
- Chipset - A similar concept in the semiconductor industry
